= United States intervention in Yemen =

United States airstrikes in Yemen

- Part of the war on terror and the Yemeni civil war (2014–present)
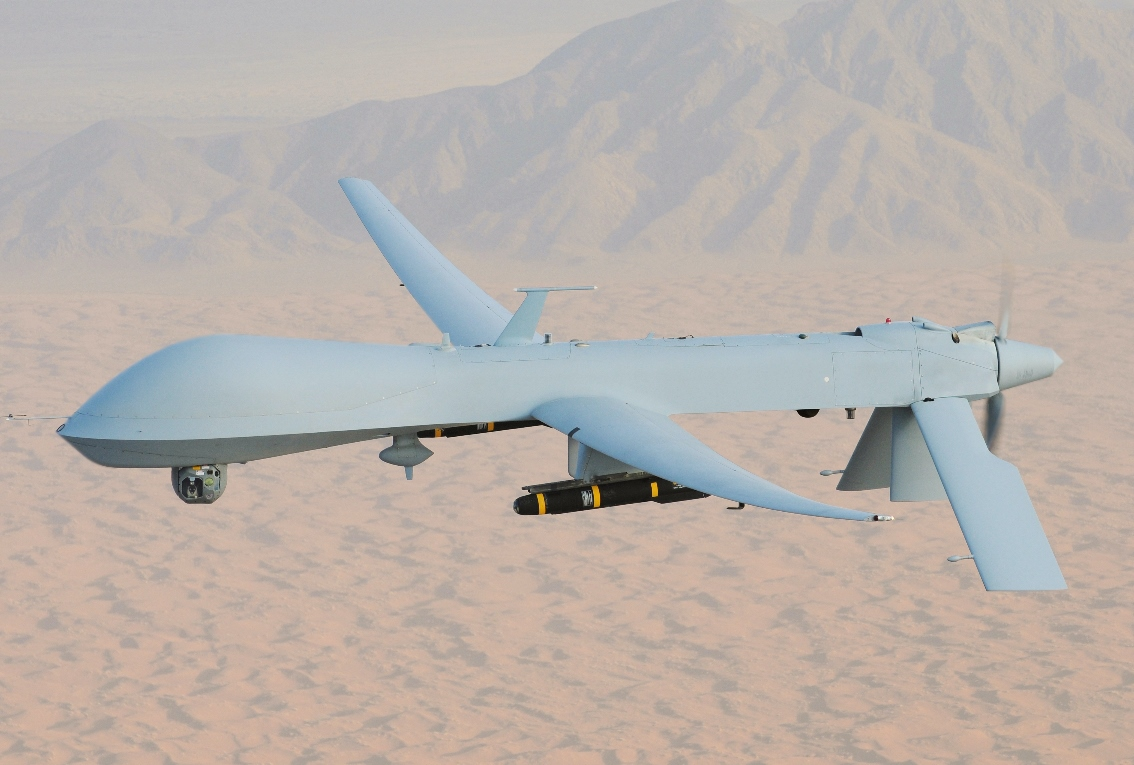
- MQ-1 Predator commonly used in drone strikes in Yemen
Date	November 5, 2002 (1 day); December 17, 2009 – 10 October 2025 (15 years, 9 months and 23 days)
Location	Yemen
Status	Ongoing: 380 drone strikes confirmed; 57 al-Qaeda in the Arabian Peninsula leaders confirmed killed; Numerous al-Qaeda in the Arabian Peninsula bases destroyed; Most recent drone strike launched in September 2025

Belligerents
United States; CIA; USAF; United States Navy; United States Marine Corps	Al-Qaeda; AQAP; Ansar al-Sharia; Al-Qaeda Emirate in Yemen; Aden-Abyan Islamic Army; Council of Sunni Scholars and al-Jama'a; Hadrami Domestic Council faction; Al-Dhahab tribesmen; Supported by: Al-Shabaab (2009–present) (alleged); Al-Qaeda in the Islamic Maghreb (2009–2017); Al-Qaeda in the Indian Subcontinent (2014–present); Al-Nusra Front (2012–2017); Islamic State of Iraq and the Levant (from 2014); Military of ISIL; Wilayah al-Yemen; Wilayat Sanaa; Wilayat Aden-Abyan; Wilayah Lahij; Wilayah Green Brigade; Wilayah al-Bayda; Wilayah Shabwah; Wilayah Ataq; Wilayah Hadramawt

Commanders and leaders
POTUS: George W. Bush (2002); Barack Obama (2009–2017); Joe Biden (2021–2025); Donald Trump (2017–2021, 2025–); USSecDef: Donald Rumsfeld (2002); Robert Gates (2007–2011); Leon Panetta (2011–2013); Chuck Hagel (2013–2015); Ash Carter (2015–2017); Jim Mattis (2017–2019); Mark Esper (2019–2020); Lloyd Austin (2021–2025); Pete Hegseth (2025–)	Nasir al-Wuhayshi †: Qasim al-Raymi †; Abu Hamza al-Zinjibari †; Said Ali al-Shihri †; Khalid Batarfi; Ibrahim al-Asiri †; Nasser bin Ali al-Ansi †; Anwar al-Awlaki †; Othman al-Ghamdi †; Ibrahim al-Rubaysh †; Harith bin Ghazi al-Nadhari †; Ibrahim al-Qosi (POW); Abdul-Malik al-Houthi

Strength
Unknown	Unknown

Casualties and losses
1 killed 3 wounded 1 V-22 Osprey crashed 1 MQ-9 Reaper shot down	1,367–1,758 total killed, 1,251–1,609 militants killed (New America) or 846–1,159 militants killed (The Bureau of Investigative Journalism)
- 116–149 civilians killed (New America) or 174–225 civilians killed (The Bureau of Investigative Journalism)

United States airstrikes in Yemen started after the September 11 attacks in the United States, when the US military attacked the Islamist militant presence in Yemen, in particular al-Qaeda in the Arabian Peninsula using drone warfare.

With the Saudi Arabian-led intervention in Yemen, the Saudi led coalition also attacked Houthi rebels using drone warfare. The Houthi military have as well used drone warfare to attack the Saudi led coalition and pro Yemen government troops.

== Background ==
The US first said that it used targeted killing in November 2002, with the cooperation and approval of the Yemeni government. On November 5, 2002, al-Qaeda operatives in a car traveling through Yemen were killed in a targeted killing by a missile launched from a CIA-controlled Predator drone.

In 2004, the Australian Broadcasting Corporation (ABC-TV) international-affairs program Foreign Correspondent investigated the targeted killing and the involvement of the US ambassador as part of a report entitled "The Yemen Option". The report examined evolving tactics and countermeasures in dealing with al-Qaeda-inspired attacks.

According to The Times, in 2010 the United States, in cooperation with Yemeni officials, launched four cruise missiles at suspected terrorist targets in Yemen. According to the Times, Yemen asked the United States to suspend the strikes after one of the missiles killed a pro-Yemeni tribal leader, Sheikh Jaber al-Shabwani, the deputy governor of Marib province, resulting in his tribe turning against the Yemeni government. The Times also stated that U.S. special forces troops were on the ground in Yemen helping to hunt al-Qaeda operatives.

An estimated 98 US drone attacks were conducted in Yemen from 2002 to 2015: 41 in 2012, 26 in 2013 and 14 in 2014.

== Timeline ==
=== 2002 ===
Early in 2002 the Bush administration approved sending about 100 Special Operations Forces to Yemen.

Six Yemeni suspected al-Qaeda members were blown up in their car in Marib province in November 2002 by a Hellfire missile from an unmanned CIA Predator drone. Among the dead were Qaed Salim Sinan al-Harethi (aka Abu Ali al-Harithi), a suspected senior al-Qaeda lieutenant believed to have helped mastermind the October 2000 USS Cole bombing. Al-Harethi was on a list of targets whose capture or death had been ordered by US President George W. Bush. and Kamal Derwish (aka Ahmed Hijazi), an American.

Also see: Marib airstrike

=== 2010 ===
In May 2010 an errant US drone attack targeting al-Qaeda terrorists in Wadi Abida, Yemen, killed five people, among them Jaber al-Shabwani, deputy governor of Ma'rib Governorate who was mediating between the government and the militants. The killing so angered Shabwani's tribesmen that in the subsequent weeks they fought heavily with government security forces, twice attacking a major oil pipeline in Marib.

=== 2011 ===
On May 5, 2011, a missile fired from a US drone killed Abdullah and Mosaad Mubarak, brothers who may have been al-Qaeda militants. The missile struck their car, and both died instantly. The strike intended to kill al-Qaeda propagandist Anwar al-Awlaki, but he was not hit in the strike.

On June 3, 2011 American manned jets (or drones) attacked and killed Ali Abdullah Naji al-Harithi, a midlevel al-Qaeda operative, and several other militant suspects, including Ammar Abadah Nasser al-Wa'eli, in a strike in southern Yemen. Four civilians were also reportedly killed in the strike, reportedly coordinated by American special forces and CIA operatives based in Sanaa. According to the Associated Press, in 2011 the US government began building an airbase near or in Yemen from which the CIA and US military plans to operate drones over Yemen. This base is located at Umm Al Melh, just north of Yemen inside Saudi Arabia. The Washington Post reported that the US previously used a base in Djibouti to fly drones over Yemen, while The Wall Street Journal reported that a US drone base in the Seychelles could be used to fly drones over Yemen.

According to local residents and unnamed American and Yemeni government officials, on July 14, 2011 US manned aircraft (or drones) attacked and destroyed a police station in Mudiya, Abyan Governorate which had been occupied by al-Qaeda militants. Yemeni media and government gave conflicting accounts on the number of casualties, estimated at between 6 and 50 killed. The same day and nearby, drone missiles reportedly hit a car belonging to Yemeni al-Qaeda leader Fahd al-Quso, but al-Quso survived the attack.

On August 1, 2011, US drones and reportedly Yemeni aircraft attacked three targets with bombs and missiles in South Yemen, killing 15 suspected al-Qaeda militants and wounding 17 others. The locations targeted included al-Wahdah, al-Amodiah, and al-Khamilah in Abyan Governorate. One of those killed was reportedly militant leader Naser al-Shadadi. According to the Yemen Post "At least 35 US drone attacks were reported in Yemen over the last two month."

On August 24, 2011, unidentified aircraft attacked suspected al-Qaeda militants near Zinjibar. The strikes reportedly killed 30 militants and wounded 40 others.

According to Yemeni officials as reported in the Long War Journal, US airstrikes in southeast Abyan Governorate on August 30 to September 1, 2011 killed 30 AQAP militants. The militants were reportedly engaged in combat with Yemeni military forces.

Two airstrikes by US-operated aircraft on September 21, 2011, reportedly killed four AQAP fighters in Abyan and seven AQAP fighters in Shaqra.

On September 30, 2011, US drone-launched missiles killed four people, including al-Qaeda propagandist Anwar al-Awlaki, in Al Jawf Governorate. The strike also killed Samir Khan, American-born editor of Inspire magazine. The strike marked the first known time that the US had deliberately targeted US citizens in a drone attack.

A reported drone strike on militant hide-outs east of Zinjibar, capital of Abyan Governorate, on October 5, 2011 killed five AQAP militants. According to Yemeni government officials, a US airstrike on October 14, 2011 killed seven AQAP militants, including Egyptian-born Ibrahim al-Bana, AQAP's media chief.

On October 14, 2011, a similar drone strike killed al-Awlaki's 17-year-old son, Abdelrahman al-Awlaki, and eight others.

A drone strike on December 22, 2011, near Zinjibar reportedly killed Abdulrahman al-Wuhayshi, a relative of Yemeni al-Qaeda leader Nasir al-Wuhayshi. A further eight militants were reported killed in an air strike near Jaʿār, Abyan Governorate, on December 17, 2011.

=== 2012 ===
An airstrike, reportedly performed by US aircraft, on January 31, 2012, near the city of Lawdar in Abyan province, killed 11 AQAP militants. The dead reportedly included Abdul Monem al-Fahtani, a participant in the USS Cole bombing.

Yemeni Civil War (2012-03-11) Territory held by al-Qaida in the Arabian Peninsula and Ansar al-Sharia (tan) included much of eastern Yemen.

The Long War Journal reported that in 2012, the US carried out its first drone strikes against AQAP in Hadramout Governorte in May 2012, from mid-May until the end of the year, the US launched seven attacks in the Governorate- a total of 41 drone strikes that took place in Yemen in 2012.

Drones engaged in three attacks over three days from March 9–11, 2012. The first strike targeted an AQAP hideout near Al Baydah, Baydah province, reportedly killing local AQAP leader Abdulwahhab al-Homaiqani and 16 of his militants. The second strike hit Jaʿār in Abyan province, reportedly killing 20 AQAP fighters. The third strike, also in Jaʿār, reportedly killed three AQAP militants and targeted a storage location for weapons AQAP had seized after overrunning a Yemeni military base in Al Koud the week before. A fourth drone strike on March 14, 2012 in Al Bydah reportedly killed four AQAP militants in a vehicle.

On April 11, 14 militants were killed in a drone strike in Lawdar town, northeast of Zinjibar, Abyan province. A drone strike on April 22, in the Al Samadah area, near the border of Marib and Al Jawf provinces, killed AQAP senior leader Mohammed Saeed al Umda (also known as Ghareeb al Taizi).

On May 6, 2012 a suspected US drone strike killed Fahd Mohammed Ahmed al-Quso and another al-Qaeda militant in southern Shabwah Governorate.

On August 29, 2012, a drone strike killed Salim bin Ali Jaber, Waleed, and three other people. In 2013, a relative of Salim and Waleed, Faisel bin Ali Jaber, met with officials linked to the White House. In 2015, a German court ruled against a case Faisal brought, citing that the German government had no mandate to take blame for American military actions. In 2017, an American court also dismissed a lawsuit brought on by Faisal.

On September 2, 2012, a drone strike killed 13 civilians.

=== 2013 ===
In 2013, 6 of the 26 strikes in Yemen, were carried out in Hadramout Governorate.

In late July, US officials uncovered an al-Qaeda plot (emanating from Yemen) which led the US to close down more than 20 embassies and diplomatic facilities across Africa, the Middle East, and Asia. In response between July 27 and August 10, the US launched 9 strikes in Yemen; no drone strikes were reported for seven weeks prior to July 27; the strikes were intended to disrupt the plot and take out AQAP's top leadership cadre and senior operatives.

2013 Radda Airstrike: On December 12, 15 people were killed in a wedding convoy in the District of Rada' which falls in the Al Bayda' Governorate. The US drone mistakenly targeted a wedding convoy after intelligence reports identified the vehicles as carrying suspects of the AQAP organization. Five of the killed had been suspected, but the remainder were civilians.

=== 2014 ===
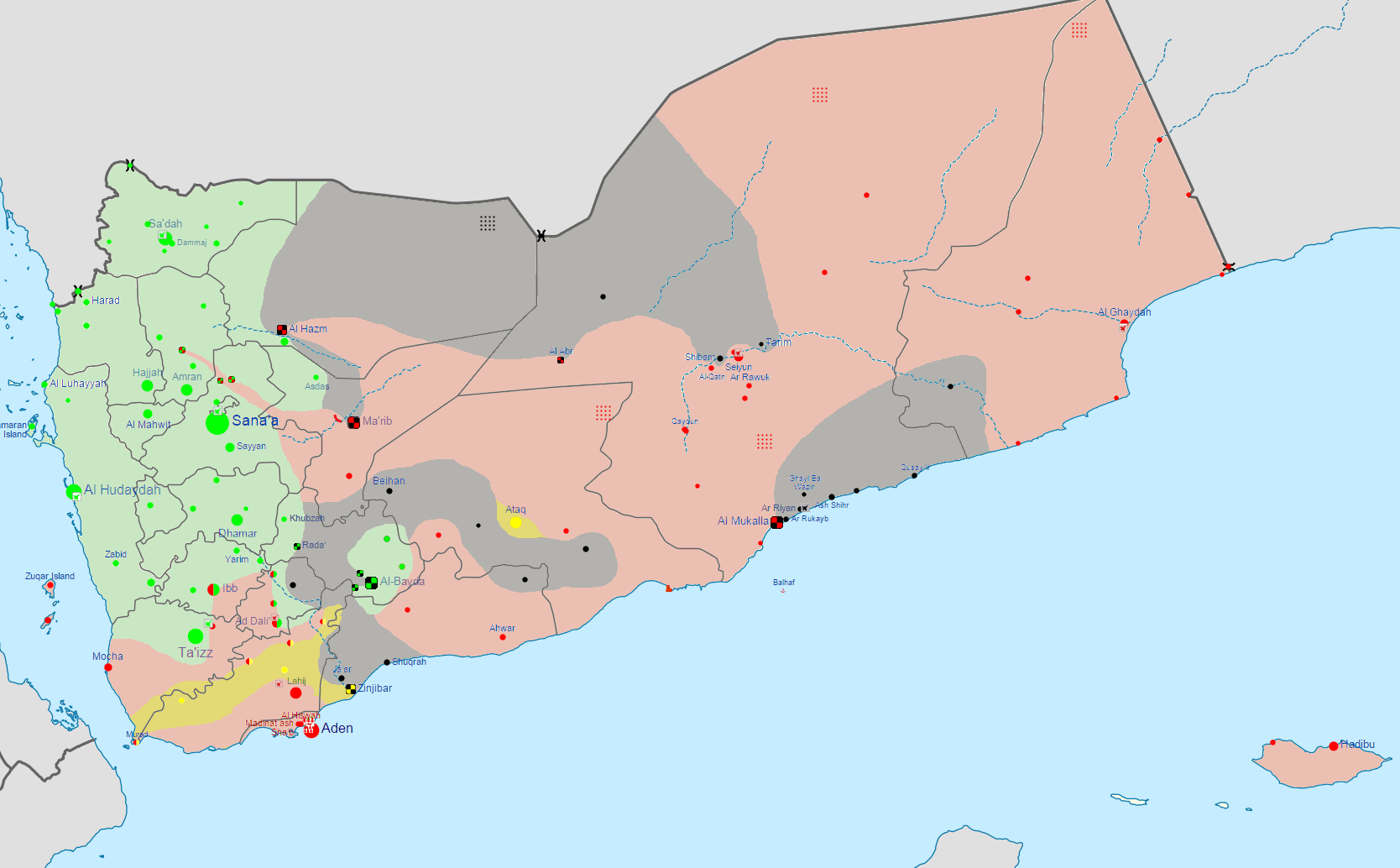
Status as of February 2015 of political and military control in ongoing Yemeni Civil War (2014–present). At that time, territory held by AQAP (grey) included portions of many provinces in eastern Yemen.

On January 8, the Long War Journal reported that 2 AQAP fighters were killed a US drone strike as they travelled by vehicle in the Al Qutn area of Hadramaut Governorate, in the first recorded US drone strike in Yemen or Pakistan of the year.

On March 3, 2014, an airstrike, believed to have been carried out by a US drone, killed three people suspected of being members of AQAP. Mujahid Gaber Saleh al Shabwani, who is one of Yemen's 25 most wanted AQAP operatives, is thought to have been killed in the strike.

On April 20 and 21, 2014, three drone strikes by the US killed at least two dozen suspected AQAP members and destroyed one of the group's training camps in southern Yemen, according to a statement released by the Yemeni Interior Ministry. In a statement, the group admitted that five civilians had been wounded and three killed during the attack.

On June 13, 2014, a suspected US drone strike targeted a car in the Mafraq al-Saeed area of the Shabwah province, killing five alleged AQAP operatives on board.

=== 2015 ===
After the closure of the US Embassy in Sana'a, US counterterrorism officials said the CIA was forced to scale back its operations in Yemen. Of the approximately 200 Americans based at the embassy, "dozens" were working for the CIA.

On January 26, 2015, a drone strike killed Mohammed Tuaiman, a sixth grader.

On June 12, 2015, a U.S. drone strike killed Nasir al-Wuhayshi, the leader of AQAP.

=== 2016 ===
The US confirmed 32 drone strikes in Yemen during 2016, resulting in 88 to 123 deaths; a further 10 or 11 reported strikes were not confirmed by the military; these resulted in 23 deaths.

On March 22, a US drone strike close to the AQAP headquarters, the port city of Mukalla, capital of Hadramaut Governorate, killed 40–50 fighters.

On March 27, a US drone strike killed 8 AQAP fighters in the southern Abyan Governorate, inside the group's territory.

On October 21, the US said it killed five AQAP fighters in an airstrike in Marib Governorate.

=== 2017 ===
On January 21, two US drone strikes killed field commander Abu Anis al-Abi and two other al-Qaeda operatives in Bayda province, security and tribal officials said.

On March 4, US armed drones and warplanes conducted more than 30 airstrikes against suspected al-Qaeda positions in three Yemeni provinces.

On October 2, 2017, U.S. Central Command stated that a MQ-9 Reaper had been shot down in western Yemen the previous day. Local videos of the event suggested it had been shot down by a surface-to-air missile.

=== 2018 ===
On July 6, 2018, a US drone strike killed seven alleged al-Qaeda militants in Shabwah Governorate.

=== 2019 ===
Current (November 2021) political and military control in ongoing Yemeni Civil War (2014–present) Controlled by the Government of Yemen (under the Presidential Leadership Council since April 2022) and allies Controlled by Houthis-led Supreme Political Council Controlled by Al-Qaeda (AQAP) and Islamic State of Iraq and the Levant-affiliated Ansar al-Sharia

On January 1, 2019, al-Qaeda operative and 2000 USS Cole bombing accomplice Jamal al-Badawi was killed in a US precision airstrike in Ma'rib Governorate.

On June 24, 2019, three drone attacks killed at least 5 militants in Al Bayda, Yemen.

=== 2020 ===
A U.S. airstrike on 25 January, in Al Abdiyah District, Ma'rib Governorate, led to killing an individual, whose identity is unknown. Another airstrike was on 27 January, which killed Abdullah Al-Adani. On January 29, 2020, the emir of AQAP, Qasim al-Raymi, was killed by an airstrike while traveling in a car with another senior AQAP leader, Abu Al-Baraa Al-Ibby, in the Yakla area of Wald Rabi' District, Al Bayda Governorate. Khalid Batarfi was named his successor a month later.

=== 2021 ===
On November 14, two suspected gunmen of al-Qaeda in the Arabian Peninsula (AQAP) and one civilian were killed in two drone strikes contested to be conducted by the U.S. in the border region between al-Bayda and Shabwa governorate.

=== 2025 ===
On May 23, the United States conducted a drone strike in the Khabar Al-Maraqsha area of Yemen's Abyan province, killing five members of al-Qaeda.

On September 17, a U.S. drone strike targeted a gathering of suspected al-Qaeda militants in the village of Khoura, located in the Lower Markha district of Shabwa province, southeastern Yemen. The attack killed at least 2 people, among the dead were Saqr Al-Humaikani and Mohammed Khamees bin Arfaj Al-Dahmi, the son of a senior al-Qaeda figure previously killed in a similar drone operation.

== Cumulative ==
Newamerica.net estimates that a total of 127 US drone attacks have been conducted in Yemen from 2002-2016; 1 in 2002, 1 in 2010, 9 in 2011, 47 in 2012, 24 in 2013, 17 in 2014, 24 in 2015, and 4 in 2016. Additionally, 15 manned airstrikes have been conducted, though manned aircraft have only been used once since 2012. The Long War Journal gives a much higher figure of 334 from 2009–2018.

== Statistics ==
U.S. drone strike statistics estimate:
Year	Attacks
2002	1
2009	2
2010	2
2011	12
2012	56
2013	25
2014	18
2015	24
2016	43
2017	48
2018	41
2019	11
2020	4
2021	2
2023	2
2025	4

== See also ==
- Yemen model
- Drone strikes in Pakistan, Afghanistan, Somalia and Libya
