= Cole Creek =

Cole Creek may refer to:

- Cole Creek (Hungry Mother Creek), a stream in Missouri
- Cole Creek (Missouri River), a stream in Missouri
- Cole Creek (Prairie Fork), a stream in Missouri
- Cole Creek (Pennsylvania)
- Cole Creek (South Dakota)
- Cole Creek, a stream in Lake County, California

== See also ==
- Coles Creek (disambiguation)
