= Cole =

Cole may refer to:

== People and fictional characters ==
- Cole (given name), including a list of people and fictional characters with the given name
- Cole (surname), including a list of people and fictional characters with the surname
- Cole tribe, an earlier name for the Kol people of India

== Places ==
=== England ===
- Cole, Somerset, a hamlet
  - Cole (for Bruton) railway station, a former station in the hamlet
- River Cole, West Midlands, which flows directly through Birmingham
- River Cole, Wiltshire, which flows through Wiltshire and Oxfordshire, where it forms the border

=== United States ===
- Cole, Denver, Colorado, a neighborhood of Denver
- Cole, Oklahoma, a town
- Cole City, Georgia, a ghost town
- Cole County, Missouri
- Cole County, original name of Union County, South Dakota
- Cole Creek (Pennsylvania), a stream
- Cole Creek (South Dakota), a stream
- Cole Township (disambiguation)

=== Elsewhere ===
- Cole Peninsula, Antarctica
- Côle, a river in southwestern France
- Cole, County Tyrone, a townland in Northern Ireland - see List of townlands of County Tyrone
- Cole, Pomeranian Voivodeship, Poland, a settlement

== Other uses ==
- USS Cole, two United States Navy destroyers
- Cole and Marmalade, an internet celebrity cat duo
- Cole Motor Car Company, a pioneer American name automobile company (1909–1925)
- Cole (film), a 2009 Canadian film
- Cole Prize, an award bestowed by the American Mathematical Society for achievements in algebra

== See also ==
- Cole Valley, San Francisco, California, a small neighborhood in San Francisco, California
- Cole Ranch AVA, California wine region in Mendocino County
- Brassica, a genus of plants in the mustard family whose crops are sometimes colloquially called "cole crops" in North America
