= Battle of Mukalla =

Battle of Mukalla may refer to:

- Battle of Mukalla (2015)
- Battle of Mukalla (2016)
