= Al-Qaeda in the Arabian Peninsula =

Salafi jihadist militant organization in Yemen

- تنظيم القاعدة في جزيرة العرب, Tanẓīm al-Qā‘idah fī Jazīrat al-‘Arab
- Leaders: Nasir al-Wuhayshi † (2009–2015); Qasim al-Raymi † (2015–20); Khalid Batarfi # (Note: AQAP announced Batarfi's death on 10 March 2024 and named Sa'ad bin Atef al-Awlaki as his successor. It did not give a cause of death for Batarfi.) (2020–2024); Sa'ad bin Atef al-Awlaki (2024–present)
- Dates active: January 2009–present
- Merger of: al-Qaeda in Yemen and al-Qaeda in Saudi Arabia
- Allegiance: Al-Qaeda
- Group: Ansar al-Sharia
- Headquarters: Azzan, Shabwah (2009–2011); Zinjibar, Abyan (2011–2012); Azzan, Shabwah and al Mahfad District, Abyan (2012–2014); Mukalla, Hadhramaut (2015–2016); unknown (2016–present)
- Active regions: Saudi Arabia Yemen (mostly): Abyan Governorate; Shabwah Governorate; Hadhramaut Governorate; Al Bayda Governorate; Marib Governorate
- Ideology: see list: Salafi Jihadism; Wahhabism; Pan-Islamism; Islamic extremism; Sunni Islamism; Qutbism; Jihadism Populism; Anti-Sufism; Anti-Zionism; Antisemitism; Anti-imperialism
- Size: 300 (2010, per Yemeni government); 1,000 (2014 estimate); 4,000 (2016 estimate); 6,000–7,000 (2018 estimate); 3,000 (2022 estimate)
- Part of: al-Qaeda

Al-Qaeda in the Arabian Peninsula (Arabic: تنظيم القاعدة في جزيرة العرب, romanized: Tanẓīm al-Qā‘idah fī Jazīrat al-‘Arab, lit. 'Organization of the Base in the Arabian Peninsula'), (Note: Or Arabic: تنظيم قاعدة الجهاد في جزيرة العرب, romanized: Tanẓīm Qā‘idat al-Jihād fī Jazīrat al-‘Arab, lit. 'Organization of Jihad's Base in the Arabian Peninsula'.) or AQAP, is a Salafi-jihadist militant organization which seeks to overthrow the Yemeni and Saudi governments. The group is based and primarily active in Yemen, seeking to establish an Islamic emirate throughout the Arabian Peninsula. AQAP is widely considered to be the most radical branch of al-Qaeda and is viewed by al-Qaeda's central command as its most loyal and important regional franchise.

During the 2000s, AQAP of Saudi Arabia carried out several mass-casualty attacks against civilian populations in Saudi Arabia. After the failure of its bombing campaign and the dismantling of al-Qaeda cells in Saudi Arabia, several AQ operatives fled to Yemen in the late 2000s and established AQAP. The group took advantage of the 2011 Yemeni revolution to seize and establish several emirates in southern Yemen, including in Zinjibar, the capital of Abyan governorate. After being driven out through a government offensive in 2012, the group returned to an insurgent campaign rather than holding territory. AQAP would again capitalize on political turmoil in the country when the Yemeni civil war broke out in 2014. AQAP would reach its territorial peak in 2015, with the group seizing much of southern Hadhramaut governorate, including its capital Mukalla, recapturing their emirates in the south, and establishing a presence across multiple fronts in the civil war against the Houthis, most prominently in Aden, Al Bayda governorate and Taiz. Its strength has since waned due to internal struggles and operations waged against them by multiple parties in the civil war, as well as through an ongoing drone campaign by the United States which has killed many of its senior leaders and members.

Formed as a merger of al-Qaeda's Saudi and Yemeni branches in 2009, AQAP was established with the aim of carrying out mass-casualty terrorist attacks in several countries across the world on behalf of al-Qaeda Central. In 2011, AQAP created Ansar Al-Sharia (Arabic: جماعة أنصار الشريعة, Jamā‘at Anṣār ash-Sharī‘ah, "Group of the Helpers of the Sharia") as a subsidiary organization which would operate exclusively within Yemen. The group was created in order to appeal to youth and their issues within only Yemen and to distance themselves from the reputation attributed to the al-Qaeda organization. It was Ansar Al-Sharia which established various emirates across southern Yemen, though despite its nominal independence the group is widely understood as being a rebrand or direct extension of AQAP.

AQAP espouses a radical interpretation of the Wahhabi ideology, characterized by incitement to sectarian violence against Sufis and Shias in Yemen. In addition to its activities within the Arabian Peninsula, AQAP has conducted several high-profile attacks in the Western world such as the attempted bombing of Northwest Airlines Flight 253 in 2009, the 2015 Charlie Hebdo shooting, and the 2019 Naval Air Station Pensacola shooting. The group has been designated a terrorist organization by the United Nations, United States, Saudi Arabia, UAE and several other countries.

== Organization ==
=== Formation ===
In the aftermath of the Soviet-Afghan war, President of the Republic of Yemen Ali Abdullah Saleh utilized thousands of Yemeni former mujahideen to fight for the Yemen Arab Republic during the Yemeni civil war of 1994, and to neutralize southern secessionists after it. A group of Yemenis who had trained under Osama bin Laden in Afghanistan formed Islamic Jihad in Yemen, which operated from 1990 to 1994. Other such Al-Qaeda affiliated groups included the Aden-Abyan Islamic Army and Al-Qaeda in Yemen (AQY).

On 12 October 2000, two AQY suicide bombers drove a rubber dinghy loaded with explosives into the side of the USS Cole while it was docked at the Port of Aden, blowing a hole in the side of the ship and killing 17 members of the crew, as well as injuring 40. This same tactic was used on 6 October 2002, when the MV Limburg was bombed while approaching the Mina Al-Dabah port, killing 1 crew member and wounding 12.

After the September 11 attacks, Saleh was heavily pressured by the United States into cracking down on Al-Qaeda groups in the country. Saleh obliged and agreed to coordinated several operations with the U.S. to defeat Al-Qaeda, such as with a CIA drone strike on 3 November 2002 which killed AQY leader Abu Ali Al-Harithi in Marib governorate. By the end of 2003, AQY and other Al-Qaeda affiliates were significantly weakened. In February 2006, 23 Al-Qaeda members escaped imprisonment in Sana'a through digging a 140-metre long tunnel. The escapees would end up rebuilding Al-Qaeda's footprint within the country over the next few years. Al-Qaeda maintained a presence in Yemen, evident by multiple high-profile attacks in the country such as the 2007 Marib car bombing and the 2008 attack on the United States embassy in Sana'a.

After initial success through early operations such as the 2003 Riyadh bombings, murder of Paul Marshall Johnson Jr. in 2004, 2004 Khobar attack, and the 2005 Qatar theatre bombing, Al-Qaeda of Saudi Arabia's remnants had been forced to flee to Yemen by late 2008 due to extreme pressure by the Saudi government. Al-Qaeda of Saudi Arabia and Al-Qaeda in Yemen merged in January 2009 to form Al-Qaeda in the Arabian Peninsula. Nasir Al-Wuhayshi, leader of the Yemeni branch, was confirmed to be the first emir of AQAP by Ayman Al-Zawahiri.

Since its formation in 2009, AQAP has been widely regarded as the most loyal and closest branch of al-Qaeda Central. In 2013, al-Qaeda emir Ayman al-Zawahiri appointed Nasir al-Wuhayshi as the general manager of AQC, a move that underscored the close relations between AQAP and AQC.

=== Ideology ===
AQAP adheres to a militant interpretation of the Wahhabi ideology that advocates violence against the Saudi state. The organization has also launched sectarian attacks against Sufis and Shias in Yemen, and regularly incites anti-Shia sectarian sentiments through its propaganda. AQAP is also the main affiliate of al-Qaeda that implements the organization's "far enemy" strategy and has carried out several high-profile international terrorist attacks on behalf of al-Qaeda Central (AQC).

According to CTC Westpoint, Salafi-jihadism has been the unifying ideology of AQAP despite differences in politics, generations and overall goals. AQAP seeks to expel Western presence and influences in the Arabian Peninsula and to establish an Islamic emirate within Yemen. The group declares that the government of Yemen is a secular and "apostate" entity which must be overthrown and replaced by an Islamic government which adheres to their interpretation of sharia law. They also argue that the Yemeni government is a puppet state of America, which secretly governs the country through their embassy in Sana'a. AQAP emphasizes that jihad is the answer to the issues of the Yemeni people, calling on sheiks, preachers and tribal leader to endorse jihad against the government and declare it illegitimate. The group operates upon a gradualist approach in order to fulfil this goal, prioritizing the establishment of acceptance amongst local Yemenis before gaining popular support among the people, and then willingness from the populace to defend AQAP-held territory. This formula would be appropriated across multiple 'emirates' across Yemen, with the eventual goal of unification in the form of a caliphate, allowing them to use Yemen as a launching pad for international attacks and operations.

In addition to attacking the Yemeni government, AQAP is one of the few Al-Qaeda affiliates which actively attempts to attack the "far enemy", that being the United States. They advocate for the unity of Muslims in order to attack American targets, whether civilian, military or diplomatic. AQAP asserts that Yemen should be the epicenter of jihad against America and secular Arab governments, as opposed to then-occupied Iraq or Afghanistan, as they deem it a religious obligation to expel "polytheists and apostates" from the Arabian Peninsula. They also believe that attacking American interests in the Arabian Peninsula, specifically oil production, would lead to the U.S. withdrawing from Iraq and Afghanistan and eventually collapsing entirely. Prior to the Yemeni revolution, most of AQAP's high-profile activities were attempted attacks against the United States, most notably the attempted bombing of Northwest Airlines Flight 253 in 2009 and a cargo plane bomb plot in 2010. A July 2010 letter from senior Al-Qaeda core member Atiyya Abd Al-Rahman urged AQAP to avoid conflict with the Yemeni government and instead dedicate itself towards attacking America. One of AQAP's main ideologues on jihad against the West was Anwar Al-Awlaki, a Yemeni American preacher who had incited multiple attacks in the United States.

=== Structure ===
AQAP's leadership and organizational structure is hierarchical and decentralized. The leader of the organization is the emir, who as of October 2024 is Sa'ad bin Atef Al-Awlaki. The emir oversees all of the group's activities and makes decisions by consulting the Shura Council. Specific duties attributed to the emir include 'approving targets, recruiting new members, allocating resources to training and attack planning, and tasking others to carry out attacks.' After the emir, leadership is dispersed throughout different departments and the Shura Council. AQAP's general command is composed of the emir along with 6 to 8 other leaders who share decision-making authority. In regards to the group's subdivisions, a United Nations Security Council report from 2018 states that the group possesses 'doctrinal (shari'a), propaganda, military, security and financial subdivisions', each with their own executive committees.

The military commander of AQAP and his Committee directs the organizations' attacks, bombings, kidnappings and robberies, with its leader currently being Ammar Al-San’ani. The Military Committee administers a mid-level leadership structure in the group with a clear chain of command; regional emirs are appointed as military commanders for each governorate (wilaya) in the country, them with their own Governorate Committee's. Below regional emirs are then commanders for different districts in the governorate who are in charge of recruits; the number of district commanders in a governorate corresponds with their strategic importance, with deputy commanders occasionally being appointed. The Military Committee researches and authorizes attacks before the Governorate Committee plans and assigns operations, leaving the district commanders to execute them. District commanders can participate in media, intelligence, and military planning or act as emissaries for AQAP clerics before being appointed governorate commander. In the event that any member in the command chain is killed, another member is trained and promoted to the vacant position.

=== Size and Membership ===
The International Crisis Group maintains that before the Yemeni revolution in 2011, AQAP possessed at most 'several hundred members.' According to the Yemeni foreign minister Abu Bakr Al-Kurbi, the group had as many as 300 members by late 2009. An estimate from the U.S. Department of State suggested that AQAP had approximately 1,000 members in 2014. This number had increased to 4,000 in a State Department release covering the group during 2016, after the Yemeni civil war had started. A UN Security Council report from July 2024 indicated that AQAP had between 2,000 and 3,000 members.

According to an analysis by Murad Batal Al-Shishani in 2010, AQAP was primarily composed of Yemenis, who reportedly make up 56 percent of the group's membership. Among Yemenis, tribal representation is equally split among northern and southern tribes. The rest of the organization was composed of Saudis, who made up 37 percent, and foreigners, who made up 7 percent. In regards to Ansar Al-Sharia, a report from 2012 states that nearly 70 percent of the group's fighters in Abyan governorate are from Jawf and Marib governorates, implying that they don't have a tribal connection to where they operate.

== History ==
=== 2009–2010: Early years ===
AQAP was formed in January 2009 in a merger of Al-Qaeda in Yemen and Al-Qaeda in Saudi Arabia. During this time, the group had no more than "a few hundred" members and mostly relied upon insurgent and terrorist tactics to target "Western interests" and "Yemeni security and intelligence forces." AQAP's first notable attacks were a string of suicide bombings in March 2009 targeting South Korean nationals. In August 2009, AQAP suicide bomber Abdullah Al-Asiri attempted to assassinate Saudi prince Muhammad bin Nayef at a Ramadan gathering in his home in Jeddah. Though the attack failed in killing bin Nayef, it provided AQAP with a demonstration of its ability to conduct high-profile attacks outside of Yemen. The group eventually received widespread notoriety in December 2009 when they claimed responsibility for an attack in which Nigerian suicide bomber Umar Farouk Abdulmutallab attempted to detonate explosives in his underwear aboard Northwest Airlines Flight 253 while it was landing in Detroit, Michigan. The two high-profile attacks prompted the United States to take an increased interest in Yemen's security, increasing the aid granted to the country to $150 million the next year.

AQAP made significant gains locally in 2010. Profiting off of outrage from a U.S. drone strike in May 2010 which killed government official Jaber Ali Al-Shabwani, AQAP launched a large series of attacks and assassinations' against security forces in Abyan, Hadramawt, Shabwah, Marib, Lahj and Aden governorates throughout spring 2010. The campaign intensified through the summer, with AQAP killing 53 Yemeni soldiers between May and August 2010 according to the government. On 20 September 2010, the Yemeni government launched an offensive in the town of Huta, Shabwah, where 80 to 100 AQAP militants were reportedly in control. The Yemeni government ended the siege four days later, with 5 AQAP members killed and 32 detained in total. By late 2010, the group had claimed 49 attacks in the country. In November 2010, AQAP claimed responsibility for two bombings against Houthi supporters which altogether killed 18 people and injured 38, raising fears of a sectarian war.

AQAP maintained their targeting of foreign interests in Yemen. On 26 April 2010, the group attempted to assassinate the UK ambassador to Yemen, Timothy Torlot, in Sana'a through a suicide bombing. Torlot was unhurt, but 3 others were injured in the attack. AQAP attempted again to kill a British diplomat, Fionna Gibb, in Sana'a on 6 October 2010 through an RPG attack, though Gibb was unharmed. On 29 October 2010, British and Emirati authorities uncovered an elaborate AQAP bomb plot meant to target the United States. The attack would have had two cargo aircraft fly into the U.S. carrying the bombs and eventually exploding mid-air.

=== 2011: Yemeni Revolution and southern emirates ===
Areas of activity and emirates held by AQAP in July 2011

Starting from January 2011 and continuing for the rest of the year, widespread discontent with the government and President Ali Abdullah Saleh, combined with the popularity of the wider Arab Spring movement culminated in the Yemeni Revolution. During this period, the military was fracturing along pro-Saleh and anti-Saleh lines, while the government's top priority was to maintain control in Sana'a. Though not participating in the protest's themselves, AQAP would take advantage of the political instability caused by the revolution through their newly formed local subsidiary, Ansar Al-Sharia. In a departure from their usual tactics up until then, AQAP, under the name of Ansar Al-Sharia, launched an offensive to seize and administer territory in southern Yemen during the spring as army forces were moved out of the south and into Sana'a to quell the uprising. In late March 2011, Ansar Al-Sharia seized Jaʽār, a town close to the capital of Abyan governorate, after army forces withdrew from the city. By the end of March, AQAP held many pockets of territory in Abyan and Shabwah governorate, declaring the "Islamic Emirate of Waqar" in their controlled areas, with Jaʽār and Azzan serving as the capitals for "Wilayat Abyan” and “Wilayat Shabwah" respectively.

In late May 2011, amid fighting in Sana'a, more than three hundred Ansar Al-Sharia fighters bolstered from their position in Jaʽār stormed Zinjibar, the capital of Abyan governorate, freeing dozens of prisoners and capturing the town. The Battle of Zinjibar would continue throughout the rest of the year, with the 25th Mechanized Brigade of the Yemeni army mostly holding defensive positions outside of the city as some 1,000 Ansar Al-Sharia militants would attempt to dislodge them, nearly doing so in July 2011 until government airstrikes fended them off. By September 2011, Ansar Al-Sharia still held Zinjibar, though they were unable to capture positions held by the Mechanized Brigade, who remained at the outskirts of the city. Meanwhile, in neighbouring Shabwah, Ansar Al-Sharia seized the town of Shuqrah in August 2011.

=== 2012–2013: Government offensive and return to insurgency ===
In November 2011, Saleh reached an agreement with the Gulf Cooperation Council to step down as president and transfer his position to vice-president Abdrabbuh Mansur Hadi. This process was completed in February 2012, with Hadi taking power and promising to liberate the south from AQAP and Ansar Al-Sharia. Hadi's arrival was hailed by the United States' government, which increased its drone strike campaign to record levels during his inaugural year.

AQAP guards outside of a building, 2012

AQAP attempted to push further north of Abyan in January 2012, seizing the city of Rada'a in Al-Bayda governorate, just 100 miles south of Sana'a. They withdrew from the town by the end of the month due to military pressure and tribal mediation, though they gained the support of tribes in the nearby town of Al-Manaseh in the northeast Qayfa region. In March 2012, AQAP launched an attack on Dofas, a town on the outskirts of Zinjibar which hosted a military encampment. The attack was a large success, killing hundreds of Yemeni soldiers, capturing seventy and seizing military armaments in the city, including an artillery unit. Emboldened, in April 2012 AQAP attempted to gain control of Lawdar, a town close to Zinjibar that possesses a strategic position between multiple governorates. Yemeni forces along with local Popular Committees successfully rebuffed the initial assaults, leading to a month long battle which would end in AQAP's retreat. On 12 May 2012, the Hadi government launched an offensive to liberate their territory in the south from Ansar Al-Sharia. A contingent of 20,000 soldiers participated in the offensive, along with other Popular Committees and American assistance. Quickly making progress, Ansar Al-Sharia retaliated against the government with the Unity Day parade rehearsal bombing in Sana'a on 21 May. The offensive continued, and on 12 June, the government captured Zinjibar and Jaʽār as Ansar Al-Sharia fled the city. Five days later, the military pushed into Shuqrah and Azzan, declaring the offensive to be over as AQAP fled all of their territory.

After losing their emirates, AQAP forces retreated into their historic strongholds of the Al-Maraqisha mountains and Al-Mahfad district in Abyan. The group shifted back to an insurgent campaign against the government, with an added degree of intensity from the strength and resources they amassed from their occupation. By July 2012, AQAP began conducting attacks in areas which were liberated by the offensive. During 2013, AQAP enjoyed a large degree of success as a result of not having to dedicate itself towards holding territory. During this period, they conducted a wide variety of operations such as "raids on military bases and prisons, the assassination of dozens of military, security and intelligence officers, the partial seizure of major cities, and attacks within Saudi territory." In December 2013, AQAP attacked the Yemeni Defense Ministry in Sana'a, killing at least 56 people, though they later apologized for attacking a hospital within the complex.

=== 2014–2016: Rapid expansion in the Yemeni civil war ===
AQAP fighters in Yemen, 2014

In September 2014, the Saada-based Houthis took control of Sana'a after a brief battle with government forces, ending in an agreement with the government. Though AQAP had previously "declared war" on the Houthis in 2011, significant fighting never occurred as the Houthis were active predominantly in northern Yemen until then. When the Houthis moved into Al-Bayda and other neighbouring governorates in October 2014 to purportedly counter the presence of the Islamic State, AQAP allied with the local, predominantly Sunni tribes to mount a fierce resistance against them, claiming 149 attacks against the Houthis by December 2014. By March 2015 the Houthis had captured most of Al-Bayda, with AQAP's strongholds remaining in the northeast Qayfa region and the southeast region of the Hamiqan tribe.

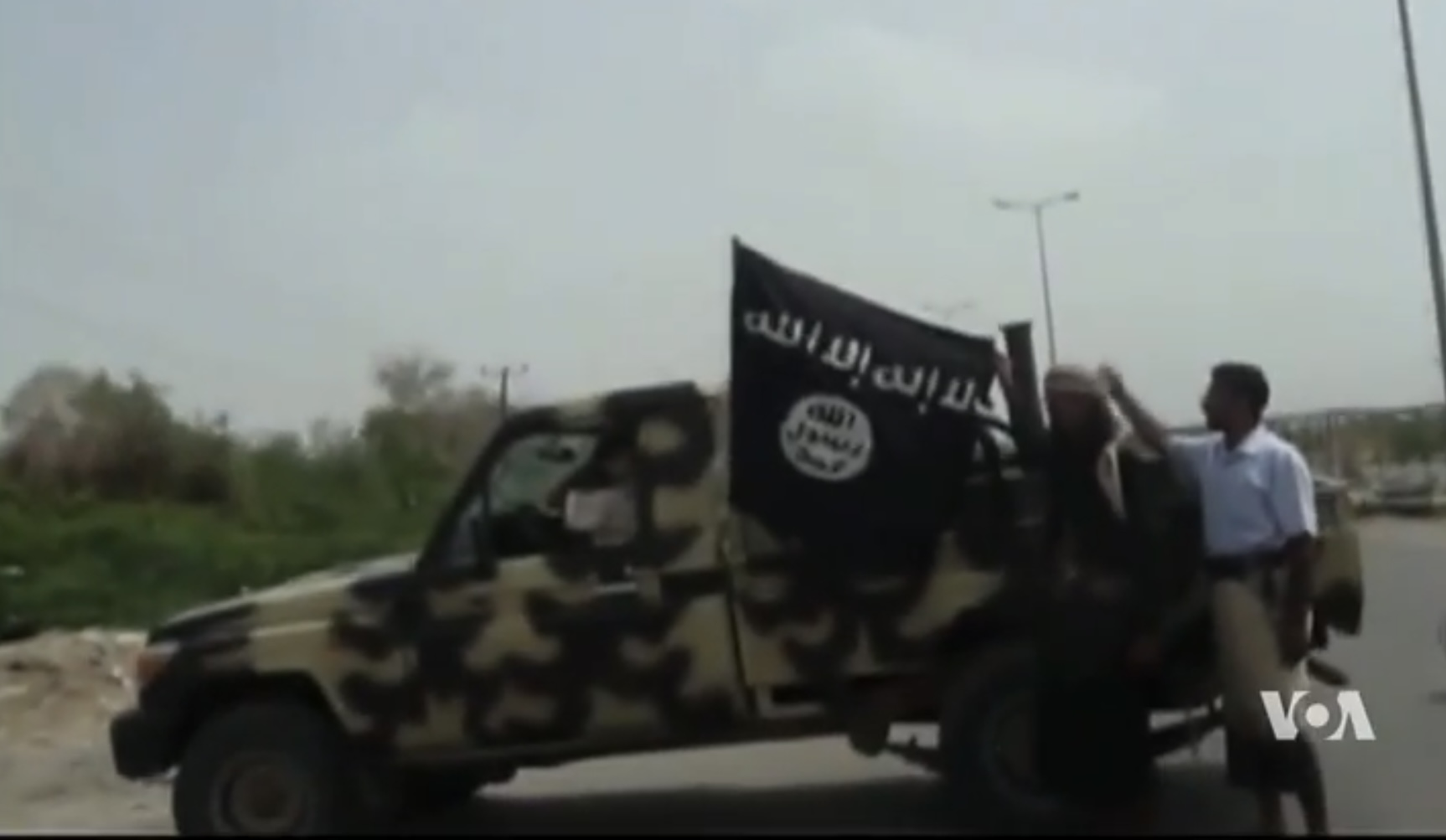
Yemeni AQAP militants with a flag

In January 2015, AQAP demonstrated their ability to conduct overseas operations when they attacked the headquarters of French magazine Charlie Hebdo in Paris, France. In February 2015, the Houthis dissolved parliament and set up their own government after Hadi resigned as president in protest. Escaping house arrest in Sana'a and moving the government to Aden, Hadi denounced the Houthis and maintained that he still had authority over the government, prompting a split in the military between forces loyal to him and those loyal to former president Saleh, who endorsed the Houthis. In March 2015, a Saudi Arabia-led coalition mobilized to support the internationally recognized government as the Houthis attempted to push into Aden. AQAP wasn't a priority to the government or coalition, who regarded them as a "bulwark" and ally against the Houthis in the central and southern governorates, effectively placing them on the same side as pro-government forces operating in the regions. Their resistance to the Houthis was especially important in Aden, Al-Bayda and Taiz, where they allied with local tribesman and Salafi fighters. AQAP's integration into anti-Houthi fronts allowed them to stretch their influence far beyond their traditional base in the south, with them operating in 82 of Yemen's 333 districts between 2015 and 2016.

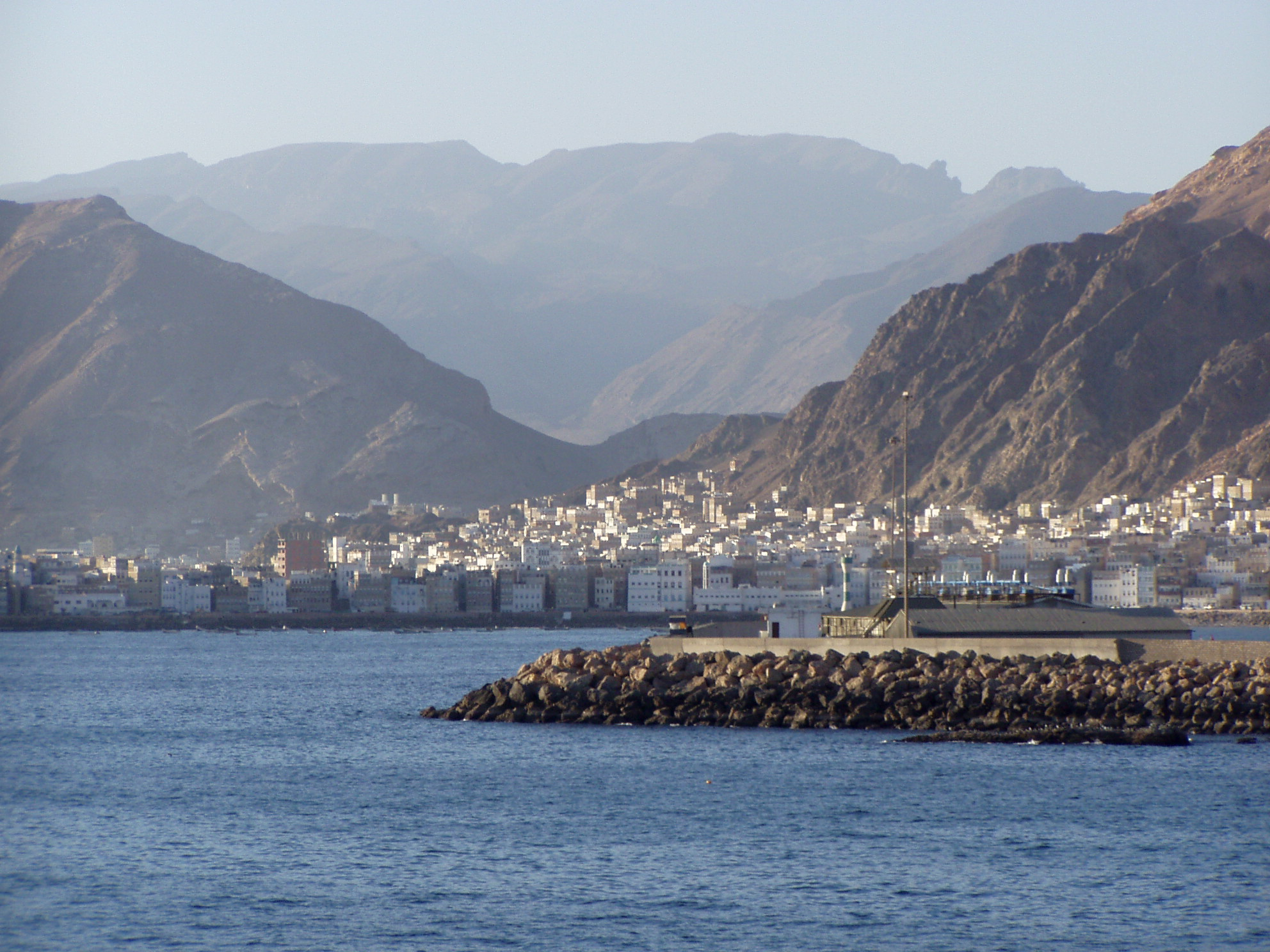
The coast of Mukalla

Utilizing the circumstances, AQAP and Ansar Al-Sharia would reestablish their emirates across the country and significantly expand their power. In April 2015, AQAP seized Mukalla, the capital of Hadhramaut and the fifth-largest city in Yemen, after a brief battle with local tribesman, who were unassisted by the government as the military had fled the city. During the battle, the group looted the local bank, freed hundreds of imprisoned AQAP members (including future emir Khalid Batarfi) and seized military equipment. From there on, Mukalla would serve as AQAP's headquarters in the country as they captured large portions of Hadhramaut's southern coast by July 2015. In July 2015, AQAP leader Nasir Al-Wuhayshi was killed in a US drone strike. Despite being labeled significant by the American government, his death did not cause large changes to AQAP's operations in Yemen. AQAP established a significant presence Aden during the year, taking part in its defense against the Houthi offensive alongside pro-government forces before turning on the government and establishing a presence in Tawahi, Crater, Khormaksar, and Mansoura districts by August 2015, and openly flying their flag in Tawahi by October 2015. In December 2015, after the Houthis were pushed out of Abyan and Shabwah by pro-government Popular Committees in August, AQAP captured Zinjibar, Jaʽār and their surrounding areas.

AQAP continued their territorial expansions into early 2016 by capturing Al-Houta, the capital of Lahij governorate, in January. In February 2016, AQAP launched an offensive in Abyan and Shabwah in a bid to connect their territory from Aden to Hadhramaut. Through the offensive, the group captured much of the regions coast, including major cities such as Azzan, Al-Mahfad, Habban, Shuqrah and Ahwar. Despite their gains early on, AQAP would go in the defensive for the rest of the year as focus from the government and coalition shifted to them. In February 2016, the United Arab Emirates, in cooperation with the government and the Saudi-led coalition, led a campaign to expel AQAP presence from Aden. By this time, AQAP developed strongholds in the Mansoura and Sheikh Othman districts. After UAE-backed forces captured Mansoura in March 2016, AQAP was forced to retreat from their controlled areas in Aden. In April 2016, the UAE led an operation to recapture Mukalla from AQAP. The Second Battle of Mukalla lasted for only a day, as AQAP had strategically withdrew from the city and other parts of Hadhramaut to relocate in Abyan and Shabwah and avoid large casualties. Most AQAP forces remaining in Hadhramaut relocated to Daw'an district. In August 2016, pro-government forces drove out AQAP from Zinjibar. Despite losing Mukalla and Zinjibar, AQAP continued to operate in a significant capacity throughout the year, with the capability to conduct large attacks and hold territory.

=== 2017–2019: Decline ===
After witnessing an unprecedented amount of success, AQAP would suffer several internal and external challenges which would have its power and territory significantly diminish.

==== United States counterterrorism ====
Under newly inaugurated president Donald Trump, the United States significantly increased their counterterrorism operations in 2017, as well as their cooperation with the Yemeni government and Saudi-led coalition to do so. The campaign was started in January 2017 when US special forces conducted a raid on Yakla, a region in southeastern Al-Bayda, with the goal of killing AQAP leader Qasim Al-Raymi. The raid faltered and ended with Al-Raymi surviving and multiple civilians dying, as well as an American soldier. The U.S. declared Abyan, Al-Bayda and Shabwa governorates “areas of active hostilities” in March 2017, allowing them to conduct a record series of 27 drone strikes during the month. American special forces participated in several UAE-led offensives during the year through providing support and intelligence. The US Air Force also provided the coalition with aerial targeting assistance, intelligence sharing, and mid-flight aerial refueling. Altogether, US drone strikes increased from 32 in 2016 to 131 in 2017; the overwhelming approach inflicting numerous losses within AQAP which have been described as "crippling" by late 2017. After an extremely active year in 2017, US operations subsequently decreased significantly in 2018 and 2019.

==== Territorial reversals ====
Several military offensives waged by the Yemeni government and its various allies significantly weakened AQAP's presence in the southern governorates. The UAE heavily utilized its proxy groups in Yemen in order to conduct counterterrorism operations against AQAP. These included the Security Belt Forces, which operated in Abyan, Aden and Lahij, the Hadhrami Elite Forces, which operated in Hadhramaut, and the Shabwani Elite Forces, which operated in Shabwah. These forces not only maintained security in their governorates of operation, but were composed solely of locals, providing a source of employment for people in the region and denying AQAP a large recruiting source. In August 2017, the Yemeni military, in conjunction with UAE and Shabwani Elite Forces as well as with American support, launched a major operation to reverse AQAP gains in Shabwah. Through the offensive, the military recaptured Azzan and all major cities in the governorate by the end of August, marking the first time in several years that the government controlled all districts in the governorate. In November 2017, government forces captured Al-Mahfad in Abyan, AQAP's last stronghold in the governorate. Despite the offensives, AQAP activities reached a guerilla peak by the end of 2017, their primary target in the year not being from the offensive but the Houthis, with 44 percent of their attacks targeting them. In 2018, the UAE along with its proxy forces launched several operations which cleared AQAP from large swathes of the southern governorates. In February 2018, Operation Al-Faisal and Operation Decisive Sword cleared AQAP from a major operations room west of Mukalla and the southern portion of Shabwah respectively. In March 2018, Operation Sweeping Torrent cleared AQAP from portions of Abyan. In April 2018, UAE-led forces launched Operation Black Mountains to capture Daw'an district from AQAP, which was achieved in May 2018. In December 2018, Operation Crushing Revenge cleared AQAP from Mudyiah district in Abyan. The operations lead to AQAP dedicating most of their activities towards the Security Belt and Elite groups, rather than the Houthis. They also lead to a decline in AQAP's operations in Hadhramaut and Abyan since 2018, and AQAP's overall activates since early 2017. Due to their diminished capability and loss of safe havens in the south, AQAP was pushed further north in Abyan, Al-Bayda and Marib governorates.

==== Internal security and cohesion ====
The intense pressure extorted upon AQAP during this period of time lead to a significant breakdown in the group's cohesion. Group leadership and chain of command was severely crippled due to drone strikes, prompting AQAP to prioritize the maintenance of internal security to prevent spying and further targeted killings. An AQAP-produced documentary series titled "Demolishing Espionage" revealed that through an investigation the group had exposed a large Saudi intelligence infiltration within their ranks in mid-2018 and accusing them of causing the deaths of many leaders since 2015. After the spy cell was uncovered, AQAP significantly reduced internal communication, leading to isolation and breakdown in collaboration between local cells and senior leadership in planning and conducting attacks. The group's leader figures went into hiding, with members being forbidden to discuss their movements. AQAP also banned the usage of mobile phones and the internet among their members. In late 2019, AQAP announced that they would grant amnesty and anonymity to any spies who confessed and repented to them.

==== Conflict with Islamic State ====
In November 2014, the Islamic State announced the formation of its regional branch in Yemen. Despite conducting numerous high-profile attacks during 2015, ISIS-Y found itself isolated due to its brutal tactics, and by late 2016 the group was mostly confined to Al-Bayda governorate. Despite conducting some notable attacks in Aden during the year, the group was in decline by late 2017 due in part to US drone strikes and sanctions. By mid-2018, ISIS-Y was eventually pushed into the Qayfa region of Al-Bayda, an AQAP stronghold in the governorate. Around this same time, AQAP forces were coincidentally redeploying to Al-Bayda due to their losses in the south. According to a deputy governor of Al-Bayda, a 'disagreement on properties, interests and positions' in July 2018 lead to a conflict between the two groups which would consume the majority of their media and military activates for multiple years. During the peak of fighting in 2019, more than 50% of AQAP's operations would be conducted against ISIS-Y, and resulted in the deaths of at least a hundred fighters. By late 2019, AQAP was above in the conflict due to tribal distaste of ISIS-Y.

=== 2020–2021: Retrenchment ===
Map of control during the Al-Bayda offensive as of 6 December 2020. Red outline denotes Houthi gains.

At the turn of the decade, AQAP began to undergo a period of retrenchment, focusing their attention on Al-Bayda governorate and significantly decreasing their activities during the year. The main reason for this was the death of leader Qasim Al-Raymi in January 2020 from a U.S. drone strike, greatly affecting their organizational capabilities. AQAP's conflict with ISIS-Y had also dissipated in 2020, with no attacks being reported against either groups since February 2020. Owing to this, AQAP began redirecting its focus and rhetoric towards the Houthis, with nearly 50 percent of their operations targeting them during the year. This retrenchment strategy resulted in AQAP being active in only 40 districts during the year, as opposed to 82 during 2015. In August 2020, the Houthis launched an offensive in Al-Bayda to uproot AQAP and ISIS-Y from Qayfa. The offensive was completed by September 2020, with AQAP losing their historic stronghold after a negotiated withdrawal. Despite an increase in AQAP activities between August 2020 and October 2020, numbers once again declined in November 2020. After losing Qayfa, AQAP forces retreated to their southeastern strongholds in Al-Bayda. Nearly 60% of AQAP activities were reported to be in Al-Bayda and against the Houthis in 2021, in similar fashion to the two previous years. Overall AQAP activities during the year were reported to be at the lowest point since at least 2015, with only four governorates having an AQAP presence. After the Houthis successfully captured all of Al-Bayda in September 2021, AQAP forces mostly retreated to Abyan and Shabwah. Despite this, AQAP continued to conduct most of their operations in Al-Bayda for the rest of the year.

=== 2022–present: Shift to south Yemen ===
AQAP's activates began shifting to the south in 2022. In April 2022, the Houthis, Yemeni government (now the Presidential Leadership Council) and Saudi-led coalition agreed to a two-month nationwide truce brokered by the UN. Shortly after its announcement, AQAP reportedly began deployments in Abyan and Shabwah. By June 2022, AQAP activities increased in both governorates. In late August 2022, the UAE-backed Southern Transitional Council (STC) began an offensive against the pro-government Islah party in southern Yemen. After peacefully capturing Abyan via agreements with pro-government forces, the STC began directing their attention to AQAP. In response, AQAP launched one of their deadliest attacks in years against Security Belt Forces in September 2022 before announcing their own operation against the STC. Fighting in Mudiyah and Lawdar districts lasted for several days, with STC forces successfully capturing key AQAP camps in Wadi Omran, Mudiyah by mid-September 2022. An additional STC offensive was launched against AQAP in Shabwah governorate in September 2022, with both operations being concluded in October 2022.

The conflict with the STC led to September 2022 being the most active month for AQAP since July 2018, though activities decreased throughout the rest of the year. It produced a large shift to AQAP's focus in Yemen; more than 70 percent of their operations were conducted in Abyan and Shabwah in 2022, while no attacks were conducted between them and the Houthis since June 2022. This absence of fighting between AQAP and the Houthis could be a pivot by AQAP to primarily target Western and government allies such as the STC, a result of the increasing influence of senior Al-Qaeda member Saif Al-Adel on the organization. Al-Adel is based in Iran and has ties to the Iranian Revolutionary Guards Corps, which directly support and back the Houthis. According to a UN Security Council report from February 2023, Al-Adel has been alleged to be the leader of Al-Qaeda after the death of Ayman Al-Zawahiri in July 2022, further suggesting a large degree of influence over AQAP.

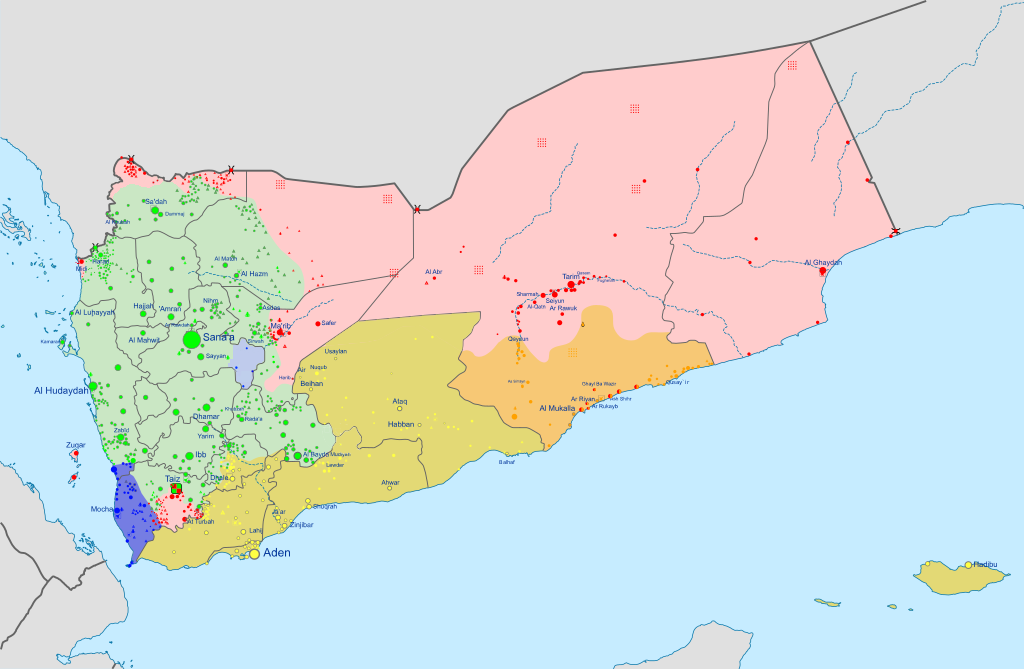
The Yemeni civil war as of 3/1/2025

AQAP's shift to the south continued through early 2023, with nearly all activities targeting the STC in Abyan, though the number of activities steadily decreased from 2022. Between May 2023 and September 2023, AQAP conducted 65 attacks, though this number dropped to nearly two-thirds between October 2023 and February 2024, with AQAP related deaths in Abyan dropping by nearly 80 percent. In March 2024, AQAP announced the death of emir Khalid Batarfi, along the selection of his successor Sa'ad bin Atef Al-Awlaki. The announcement did not provide a cause as to how Batarfi died, leading to speculation that he had died by natural causes. After the death of Batarfi, a resurgence in AQAP attacks was reported in late March 2024 and the group has focused on maintain a presence in the rural areas and have been pushed out al Bayda and al Mudiyah completely in 2025 by Houthi forces and on its eastern forces have been clashing with STC forces.

== Attacks outside of Yemen ==
=== Attempted bombing of Northwest Airlines Flight 253 ===
On 25 December 2009, Nigerian foreign student Umar Farouk Abdulmutallab attempted to bomb Northwest Airlines Flight 253 while it prepared to land in Detroit, Michigan. Abdulmutallab, a Nigerian national, studied in Sana'a from 2004 to 2005 before moving to the United Kingdom to attend the University College London until 2008. He returned to Yemen in August 2009 for studies, but left his university a month later. He was brought to the attention of AQAP some time in autumn, and by November 2009 he was recruited by AQAP to conduct the attack. His activities were personally overseen by Anwar Al-Awlaki, who identified him for the suicide attack after witnessing him training, and gave him instructions on how to conduct it. Abdulmutallab travelled from Murtala Muhammed International Airport in Lagos, Nigeria to Schiphol Airport in Amsterdam, Netherlands, before transferring to Northwest Airlines Flight 253. As the flight approached its destination, he tried to trigger PETN explosives attached to his underwear while seated, but the device failed to detonate properly and caught on fire before he was restrained by passengers. AQAP took responsibility for the attempted bombing on 28 December 2009, claiming that the attack was in response to U.S. airstrikes in Yemen earlier in the month.

=== Cargo plane bomb plot ===
On 29 October 2010, British police at East Midlands Airport defused a printer cartridge bomb loaded on a UPS cargo plane after a tip from Saudi Arabian intelligence that had cargo aircraft arriving to the United States grounded. After being informed by Britain, Emirati authorities in Dubai subsequently discovered another printer bomb inside of a FedEx Express cargo plane. The two bombs were inside of packages sent from Sana'a; the first one travelling through a passenger plane to Dubai and then a cargo plane to Cologne before reaching England, and the second one through two Qatar Airways passenger planes before reaching the UAE. The two packages were bound to out of date addresses for Jewish institutions in Chicago, though investigators believed that the bombs may have been meant to explode within American airspace while on board the cargo planes carrying them. The bombs, designed by Ibrahim Al-Asiri, were highly complex and unable to be detected by British authorities at first. Both bombs were composed similarly, having a cell phone timer that, once set off, would activate a light-emitting diode that would inject a syringe with a chemical igniter into the printer cartridge loaded with 11 to 14 ounces of PETN. AQAP claimed the attack on 5 November 2010.

=== Charlie Hebdo shooting ===
On 7 January 2015, French-Algerian brothers Saïd and Chérif Kouachi attacked the Paris headquarters of French satirical newspaper Charlie Hebdo, killing 12 people. The brothers came through the main entrance of the office with assault rifles and opened fire on its staff, killing five cartoonists, two columnists, a copy editor, a guest at the board meeting, a police officer and a maintenance worker. After leaving the building shouting that they had "avenged the Prophet Muhammad", they engaged in a firefight with police on the streets before fleeing in their car, killing an officer before they stole another vehicle and left Paris. French authorities subsequently launched a manhunt, tracking the suspects to Villers-Cotterêts on 8 January after they robbed a gas station. On the morning of 9 January, the suspects stole a car and headed to Dammartin-en-Goële before entering a print workshop and taking a hostage. Besieged by the GIGN, at night the brothers left the building and engaged in a battle with the police, eventually killing both of them and ending the manhunt. At least one of the brothers visited Yemen in 2011 for several months to train with AQAP, receive $20,000 to finance an attack, and meet with Anwar Al-Awlaki in Shabwah during their stay. American intelligence initially believed it was Saïd Kouachi who had gone to Yemen, but they later reneged on their position and said that Chérif had gone. While they were besieged in the print workshop in Dammartin-en-Goële, French news channel BFMTV conducted a phone call interview with Chérif Kouachi, in which he said that he was sent by "Yemen's Al-Qaeda" and that Awlaki financed him. On 14 January 2015, AQAP claimed responsibility for the Charlie Hebdo shooting in a video depicting cleric Nasser bin Ali Al-Ansi. In the video, Al-Ansi claims that the attack was 'vengeance' for Prophet Muhammad, who was mockingly depicted in a cartoon published by the newspaper, and that they had planned and financed the attack.

=== Pensacola shooting ===
On 6 December 2019, Saudi Arabian Mohammed Saeed Alshamrani attacked Naval Air Station Pensacola in Pensacola, Florida, killing 3 U.S. Navy members and injuring 8 others. The attacker opened fire with a handgun in a two-floor classroom within the base before officers arrived and exchanged gunfire, killing him. Alshamrani was a second lieutenant in the Royal Saudi Air Force and was undergoing pilot training at the base since August 2017. An FBI investigation reported that Alshamrani was a jihadist who held 'anti-American and anti-Israeli views' and that he saw violence as a necessity. He had also posted anti-American messages on social media just before conducting the shooting. On 2 February 2020, AQAP released a video claiming responsibility for the shooting, and that they had communication with Alshamrani. On May 8, 2020, the FBI confirmed that AQAP was involved in the shooting after breaking into Alshamrani's iPhone. Evidence suggested that Alshamrani was radicalized in 2015, maintained regular communications with an AQAP contact since then, and had coordinated, planned, and shared tactics with the contact in order to conduct the attack.

=== Other incidents ===
On 27 August 2009, a member of AQAP, Abdallah Al-Asiri, attempted to assassinate the Prince Muhammad bin Nayef, a Senior Member of Saudi Royal family who was at that time an Assistant Minister. Although the suicide bomber was killed immediately, Muhammad Bin Nayef survived the attack but received little wounds. The Bomber had hid the bomb in his rectum/anal canal, which shows the Capability of AQAP to bypass security through its weird concealment methods.

CIA and Saudi intelligence agency foiled an AQAP plot to smuggle a bomb onto a plane bound to the United States on 8 May 2012. The CIA had detected the plot by mid-April, and dispatched an operative to pose as a suicide bomber for the group, attaining the explosives meant for the bombing and turning them over to the CIA. The bomb was manufactured by Ibrahim Al-Asiri.

From March to July 2017, the U.S. government issued a ban on passengers carrying large electronics such as laptops on certain Middle Eastern and North African flights. The ban was justified by the government based on documents recovered by U.S. Special Forces during the Yakla raid, which detail AQAP plans to refine their ability to hide bombs inside of laptops and other devices.

== Strategy ==
=== Tribal relations ===
AQAP places significant importance upon its relationships with the tribes of Yemen. In 1999, Al-Qaeda strategist Abu Musab Al-Suri identified Yemen's rural tribal areas as an ideal base of operations for the group due to the prominence of tribal culture and militarism as well as the relative underdevelopment of the areas. Many areas of Yemen have very little control from the central government and are essentially governed by their respective tribes, who employ an egalitarian governing system which follows tribal laws and customs. Tribesmen are independent in their decision making but are expected to adhere to the collective interest of their tribe, and are held responsible for actions which are detrimental to the collective.

Through their propaganda messaging, AQAP has been able to exploit corruption, the lack of infrastructure and development allocated to tribal areas, as well as overstepping on part of the government and other groups in order to gain the allegiance of certain tribesmen. This strategy attracts unemployed and uneducated tribal youth within their operational strongholds who, as opposed to joining for ideological reasons, are mostly drawn into the group due to the promise of material benefits such as high salaries, new personal weapons and vehicles, and the assurance of assisting them with getting married and building a home. Joining AQAP also gives them a sense of purpose and a way to further their status among their tribe. AQAP has been employed by tribal sheikhs to provide them food and water in exchange for recruits. The group's members have also married into tribes and established kinships within them, such as with Anwar Al-Awlaki marrying into the Al-Dhahab tribe.

Despite their efforts, as of 2011 AQAP has not forged permanent or long-term alliances with Yemeni tribes. Tribes mostly avoid AQAP to not draw counterterrorism operations within their lands or create strife within their own tribe between pro and anti-AQAP factions. AQAP's ideology directly contradicts many core tenets of tribal law and society, such as the sparing of soldiers and civilians, the authority of the state, which AQAP seeks to overthrow, and tribal need for autonomy, which contradicts AQAP's goal of establishing a rigid Islamic caliphate. AQAP is able to operate in tribal areas due to reluctance of tribes to resort to violence or cooperate with government offensives. In the case that a tribesman joins AQAP and allows the group to operate within their areas, tribes send delegations to mediate between the two parties in order to either convince the tribesmen to leave AQAP, or to ensure that their lands won't be used as a staging ground for attacks and evict foreign militants. If neither terms are meeted, the tribesmen are usually disowned, stripping them of tribal benefits such as protection and vengeance for their death.

==== Abyan and Shabwah ====
In 2011, Ansar Al-Sharia gained the allyship of Tariq Al-Fadhli, the leader of the Al-Fadhli tribe. Al-Fadhli represents the largest tribe in Abyan, with its territory including major cities within the governorate such as Zinjibar, Jaʽār and Shuqrah. Tariq had reportedly permitted the establishment of AQAP training camps in Abyan in the 2000s, and actively took part in Ansar Al-Sharia public ceremonies and mediation between the group and the Yemeni and Saudi governments for the release of imprisoned militants. Tariq's status as an opportunist who frequently changed his allegiances between different factions in Yemen provokes skepticism in his long-term goals. He fled with Ansar Al-Sharia forces into the Al-Maraqisha mountains in June 2012 after their defeat and was later arrested and imprisoned in Aden. He escaped once again to the Al-Maraqisha in 2014, and announced his official membership in AQAP, taking part in negotiations for the group such as for their withdrawal from Mukalla in 2016. While many Al-Fadhli tribesmen followed him in cooperating with AQAP, Tariq's relations with AQAP caused strife within the tribe, with multiple tribesmen and sheikhs rejecting his leadership and fighting against AQAP alongside government forces during their 2012 offensive.

AQAP maintains strong ties with the Al-Awaleq tribe, one of the most powerful in southern Yemen. The tribe is divided between the Upper and Lower Awlaki's, which are located in Shabwah and western Abyan respectively. Mountainous terrain, lack of government interest or control over many parts the governorate and general disassociation from the government due to past and current exploitation and persecution made Shabwah an ideal location for AQAP to build a base of operations. AQAP leader have historically travelled to Shabwah as a sanctuary, such as with Fahd Al-Quso, an AQAP commander who was killed by a drone strike in the governorate. Multiple senior members of AQAP have descended from the Al-Awaleq tribe including Anwar Al-Awlaki and Sa’ad Bin Atef Al-Awlaki, whose appointment as emir in 2024 could signal an increase in cooperation with the tribe due the latter's support for him.

== Media and propaganda ==
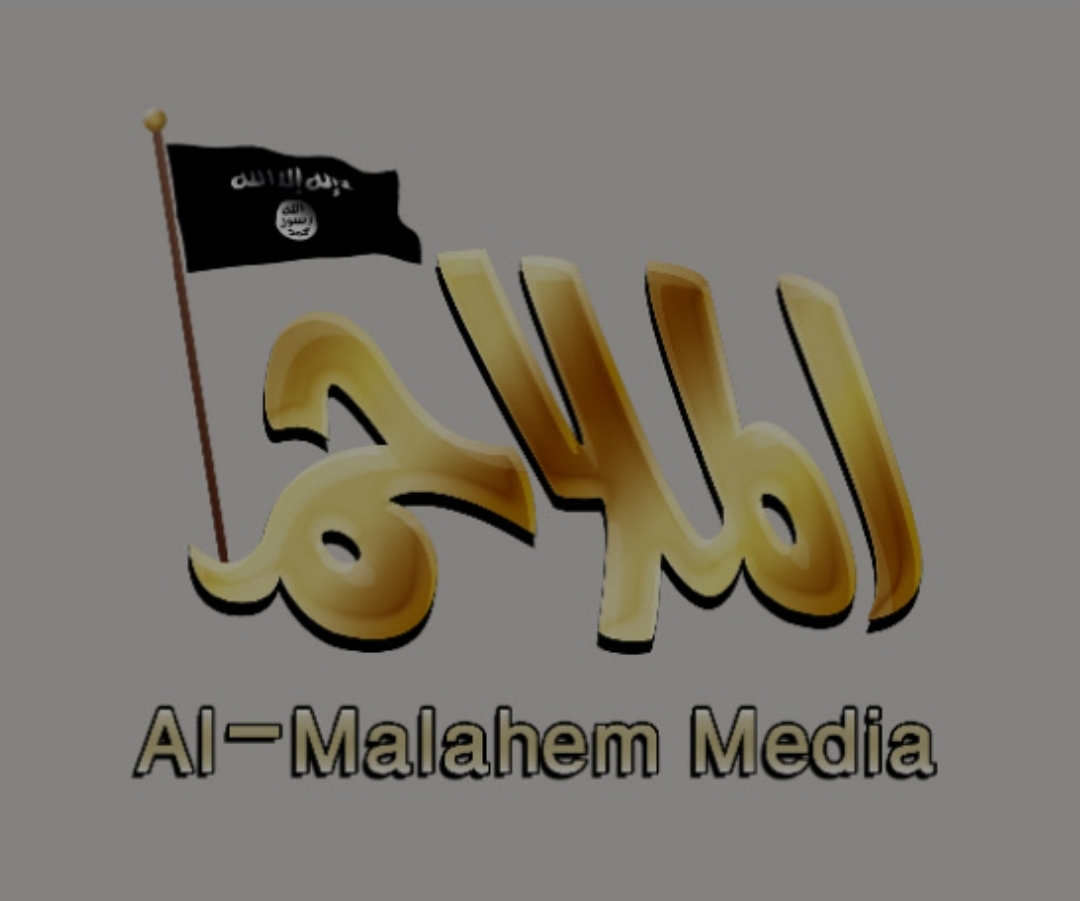
The Al-Malahem Media logo, which appears across much of its content

AQAP maintains a unique role among Al-Qaeda affiliates in that the group has a leadership position in producing propaganda and media on behalf of the Al-Qaeda core. AQAP's propaganda publications release content that closely aligns with the strategic goals of al-Qaeda Central (AQC), aiming to build an international media brand for the al-Qaeda network.

AQAP's propaganda is handled through the Al-Malahem Media Foundation (Arabic: الملاحم, romanized: Al-malāḥim, lit. 'The battle/war'), its official media wing. Al-Malahem produces audio and video releases containing official statements, leadership speeches, claims for attacks, eulogies, reports on local activities and various serial productions such as ones focusing on martyrs or lessons on Islam. It also produces hard copy media for AQAP da'wa centres in areas which they control or operate in, where locals are preached to and indoctrinated into the group. Among the media given in da'wa activities are magazines, newspapers, CDs, films, nasheeds, lectures, copies of the Quran and poems. Hard copies are important to AQAP's local propaganda strategy due to the absence of electricity and the internet in many parts of Yemen, particularly within the frontlines of the civil war and in tribal areas. The structure of Al-Mahalem is similar to that of other Al-Qaeda affiliates. AQAP's propaganda committee dictates the message that should be sent through a release, which is then delegated to Al-Malahem staff to produce, publish, and disseminate throughout various sources including social media sites such as Telegram and Twitter as well as blogs, and Islamist forums and file-sharing websites. Al-Malahem staff receive "jihadist training" courses covering the internet and how to use it safely without being tracked, and are required to coordinate with AQAP's security committee when using the internet.

AQAP's media products have gone through multiple iterations throughout its existence, often reflecting the current state of the group. From 2008 to 2011, AQAP's main Arabic production was Sada Al-Malahem (Arabic: صدى الملاحم, lit. 'Echoes of Battle'), an online and physical mixed-content magazine released in a bimonthly fashion and focusing mostly on Yemenis with theological, juristic and political articles. The magazine discussed topics such as corruption, poverty, inadequate service provision and inequities in natural resource allocation in order to appeal to locals and their issues, while also pertaining to global jihad. The magazine was tuned to Yemeni culture, featuring poetry, personal testimonies, letters, memoirs, martyrologies and congratulations to families or tribes on marriages, births and deaths. In the midst of the Yemeni revolution and AQAP's first emirates, the group replaced Sada Al-Malahem with Madad, a shorter, monthly newspaper which was attuned to the Arab Spring movement. The newspaper covered AQAP's battles and activities within their areas of control and promoted anti-American and anti-democratic sentiment, instead attempting to promote AQAP as a superior alternative to democracy by highlighting their governing ability, 'good works' and community interactions. The newspaper ceased production with the end of AQAP's emirates in 2012.

The rise of the Islamic State as well as the Houthis in 2014 led to an increase in militarism and sectarianism in AQAP's media. From 2014 to 2015, AQAP ran a video series titled Min Al-Midan (Arabic: من الميدان, lit. 'From the Field/Battlefield'), recording attacks against the Yemeni military which it described as 'Houthi-ized.' Amid AQAP's occupation of various parts of southern Yemen, in January 2016 the group launched Al-Masra, a newspaper which ran a total of 57 issues. The newspaper, both distributed in hard copy across their territory and published online through Telegram, covered community worked conducted by AQAP, updates on the entire Al-Qaeda network, as well as standard coverage of various world events such as the shooting of Alton Sterling and the assassination of Jamal Khashoggi. The newspaper was an attempt to position Al-Qaeda as a broad international movement amid the dominance of the Islamic State, with interviews and messages from leaders in Al-Qaeda core, Al-Qaeda in the Islamic Maghreb, Al-Qaeda in the Indian Subcontinent and Al-Shabaab being featured.

AQAP's propaganda network began experiencing strain from mid 2017 onwards due to frequent U.S. drone strikes. Though the newspaper was initially meant to be released multiple times per month, pressure on AQAP led to Al-Masra not releasing an issue since July 2017. In 2018, AQAP's media began focusing frequently on spying and internal security. These releases were designed to gain sympathy and deter further spying, such as the film "Secrets, Dangers, and the Departure of the Best", and the video series "Demolishing Espionage." In May 2018, Al-Badr Media Foundation, a pro-AQAP media outlet, announced its presence online, with its first release being a PDF detailing how to avoid detection and assassination from drone strikes. During 2021, Al-Malahem's releases were mostly recycled speeches by various AQAP leaders superimposed over video footage in an attempt to remain relevant despite significant losses. The Gaza war and Stockholm Quran burnings has led to an increase in media activity from AQAP during 2023 and 2024. In 2025, AQAP announced that it would target the People's Republic of China and its interests in response to Uyghur persecution.

AQAP historically has maintained channels dedicated to the production of nasheeds or Islamic acapellas through online publications such as Al-Bashair Audio, Al-Nafir Audio Production, and chanters like Abu Musab al-Adani or Abu Hajar al-Hadrhami. Typically, the hymns are sung as eulogies, qur'anic recitation, battle anthems and threnodies often with the theme of promoting martyrdom, sectarian violence or spoils of war.

=== Inspire ===
In July 2010, Al-Malahem Media launched Inspire, an English-language magazine targeted to Muslim audience in the Western world who cannot understand Arabic. The magazine features guides and instructions on how to conduct lone wolf terrorist attacks in the West, as well as general AQAP propaganda and bylines from prominent Al-Qaeda figures such as Osama Bin Laden and Ayman Al-Zawahiri. According to its late creator, editor and publisher Samir Khan, the magazine 'Tackle['s] issues that are not only happening abroad in the Muslim world, but also focus[es] on domestic issues pertinent to the Muslim community in the West', in addition to rehabilitating the image of AQAP and providing commentary on current issues and events. Inspire has been described as "a streamlined and seamless fusion of ideologically-driven material with pragmatic instructional and skillbuilding content." with the goal of motivating terrorism and providing readers with easy ways to conduct their own attacks, evident by each article featuring a section titled "Open Source Jihad." Critics and viewers have noted its difference in tone and design to other AQAP media such as Sala Al-Mahalem, with an approach more oriented towards youth in the United States and other Western nations through its modern look and use of colloquial English as well as pop culture references. Reception to the magazine's first issue was largely skeptikal from online jihadists due to its foreign presentation as well as technical issues, though opinions eventually grew more positive later on, with each issues amassing thousands of views and downloads on Islamist forums by 2014.

=== Anwar Al-Awlaki ===
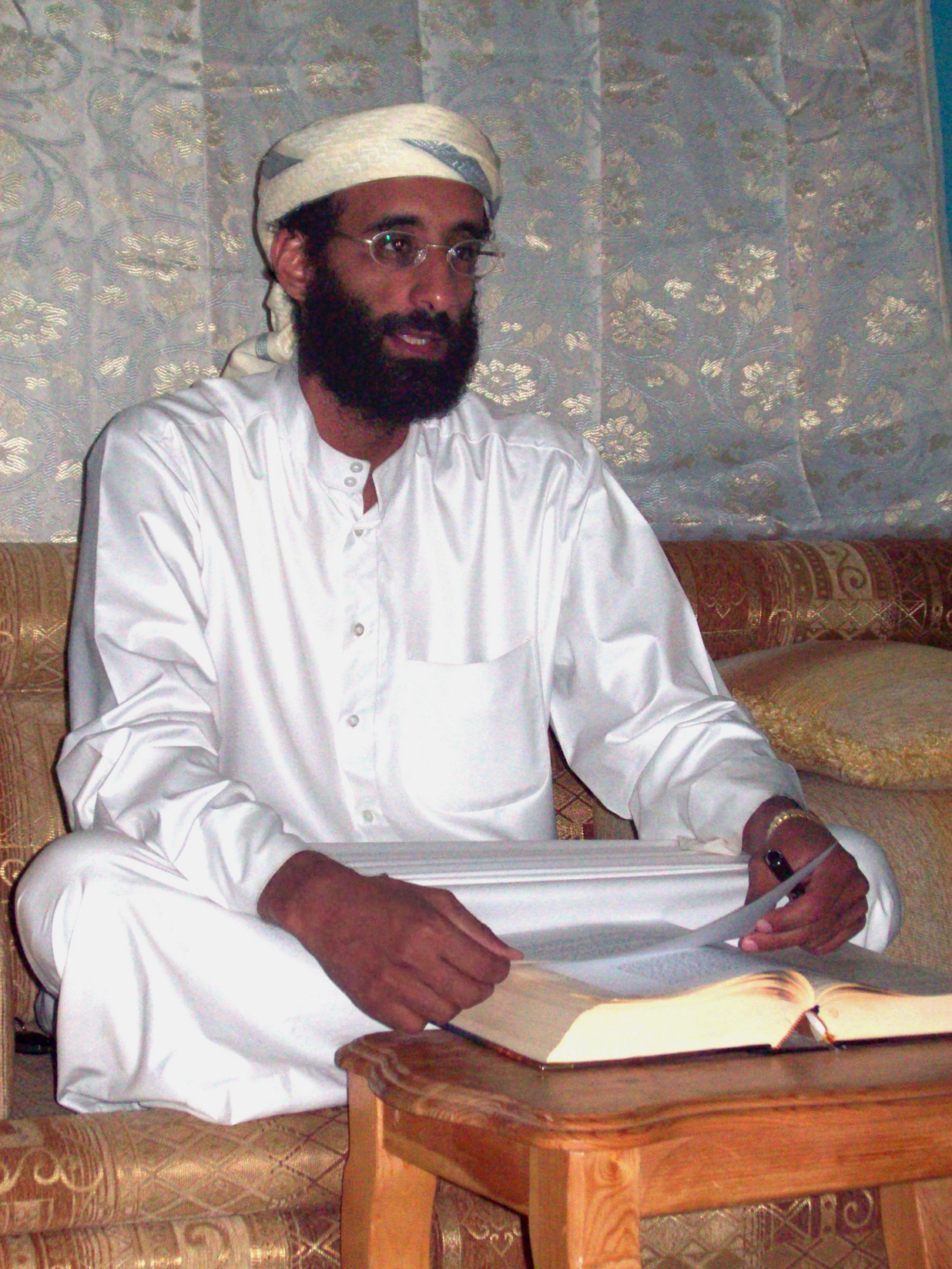
Anwar Al-Awlaki

Anwar Al-Awlaki (Arabic: أنور العولقي, romanized: Anwar Al-'Awlaqī; April 21 or 22, 1971 – September 30, 2011) was a Yemeni-American preacher who served as AQAP's "leader of external operations" according to the United States government. Awlaki has been referred to as the most popular English recruiter for AQAP, Al-Qaeda and jihadism in general, even after his death. Among his methods of output included a web blog, a Facebook page, booklets, CD's, audio recordings, online lectures, magazines and videos among others, which would then be spread across the internet, YouTube, and on Islamist forums. According to The New York Times, Awlaki utilized a combination of "scripture and vitriol", a captivating character and oration style, as well as an advanced knowledge and usage of the internet in order to promote violent extremism to Muslim youth in the West. Analysts have frequently noted Awlaki's fluency in American English as well as Arabic, allowing him to maintain a "dual identity" which balanced religious legitimacy and relatability. Also commonly noted is his signature passive and soft demeanor, giving him a down-to-earth and relatable persona as opposed to more brutal and outwardly violent Al-Qaeda figureheads such as Abu Musab Al-Zarqawi. Awlaki headed the proliferation of a personalized, "do-it-yourself" type of jihad, where he encouraged followers to conduct lone wolf attacks in their home country. He was heavily involved with the production of Inspire, writing an article for the magazine's debut issue. Awlaki was killed in a U.S. drone strike on 30 September 2011 while entering a pickup truck with five other AQAP members, including Inspire editor Samir Khan. Commentators have noted that Awlaki's killing had allowed him to achieve a "martyrdom" status among Islamists, with his media still receiving attention years after his death and numerous Islamic terrorists having been known to possess his propaganda, such as Dzhokhar and Tamerlan Tsarnaev, the perpetrators of the 2013 Boston Marathon bombing.

== Sources of income ==
AQAP's funding primarily comes from robberies, kidnappings and donations. In 2017, Yemeni officials estimated that AQAP spends about $10 million annually to maintain operations. According to Ansar Al-Sharia leader Jalal Al-Baleedi in 2012, the group spent approximately $300,000 monthly operating in Abyan governorate alone.

Prior to the Yemeni civil war, kidnapping was described as AQAP primary source of revenue. The group began heavily utilizing kidnappings for ransom as a strategy in 2011, reportedly generating $20 million or $30 million in ransom payments for European hostages by 2013, which accounted for half of their funding during that period. According to The New York Times, AQAP received two major ransom payments during this period; $9 million in 2011 for three French nationals, paid by the French government, and $20.4 million in 2012–13, paid by Oman and Qatar, for four Europeans on behalf of their governments. AQAP has been known to buy foreigners who are originally kidnapped by non-AQAP affiliated tribesmen.

During the time of their first emirates, AQAP levied income taxes on individuals ranging from 10 percent to 20 percent, and on corporations with a flat 20 percent. In the initial battle for Zinjibar in 2011, AQAP looted the provincial bank in the city, gaining a sum reported to be in the low millions.

The outbreak of the Yemeni civil war and subsequent government and coalition ignorance towards AQAP allowed the group to significantly bolster its finances. AQAP was able to gain money through bank robbing and seaport control for smuggling routes. The highlight of their financial gain was through their occupation of Mukalla from 2015 to 2016, which a UAE official described as 'al-Qaeda's lungs' as well as being called the equivalent to the Islamic State's former Syrian capital, Raqqa. During the initial battle in April 2015, AQAP looted the central bank in the city, seizing an estimated $100 million; enough money to fund their operations for ten years according to a Yemeni official. The port of Mukalla provided AQAP with a significant source of income in the form of fuel smuggling, where hundreds of oil trucks would arrive at the port to pick up and transport fuel across the country. Through imposing taxes and custom tariffs on shippers and traders, AQAP reportedly earned up to $2 million to $5 million through Mukalla daily. Attempting to legitimize their endeavors as a de facto quasi-state, in October 2015 AQAP attempted to sign a deal with the Yemeni government allowing them to export oil through the port while receiving a quarter of the profit, though it was immediately rejected. AQAP utilized extortion against state firms during their occupation, such as in January 2016 when they demanded $4.7 million from Yemen's national oil company, receiving $1.4 million. The loss of Mukalla in April 2016 constituted a significant blow to AQAP's funding, though AQAP was allowed to keep their loot from the city in a deal with the government. Altogether, AQAP was estimated to have gained more than $750 million from their occupation of Mukalla.

An Associated Press investigation from 2018 suggested that the Yemeni government and Saudi-led coalition had been outright paying AQAP to leave certain areas in order to claim them as military victories. According to the security chief of Shabwah, AQAP fighters were paid to withdraw from Al-Said district, their base in the governorate, as the UAE and coalition began an offensive which targeted the district in February 2018. A reported 200 AQAP members were paid off by the coalition, including a senior member who was paid $26,000. According to a mediator in the deal, the coalition had offered $5 million to AQAP and $13,000 to each individual fighter who left.

== Ansar Al-Sharia ==
AQAP fighters in Yemen

In the wake of the 2011 Yemeni Revolution and the Battle of Zinjibar, an Islamist insurgent organization called Jama'at Ansar Al-Shari'a (Arabic: جماعة أنصار الشريعة; Jamāʿat Anṣār aš-Šharīʿa), also known as Ansar Al-Sharia, emerged in Yemen and seized control of areas in the Abyan and surrounding governorates in southern Yemen and declared them an Islamist Al-Qaeda Emirate in Yemen. There was heavy fighting with the Yemeni security forces over the control of these territories, with Ansar Al-Sharia driven out of most of their territory over 2012.

In April 2011, Shaykh Abu Zubayr Adil bin Abdullah Al-Abab, AQAP's chief religious figure, explained the name change as a rebranding exercise: "the name Ansar Al-Sharia is what we use to introduce ourselves in areas where we work to tell people about our work and goals."

On 4 October 2012, the United Nations 1267–1989 Al-Qaida Sanctions Committee and the United States Department of State designated Ansar Al-Sharia an alias for AQAP, with the State Department describing it as an attempt to attract followers in areas of Yemen where AQAP had been able to establish territorial control and implement its interpretation of Sharia.

== U.S. operations ==
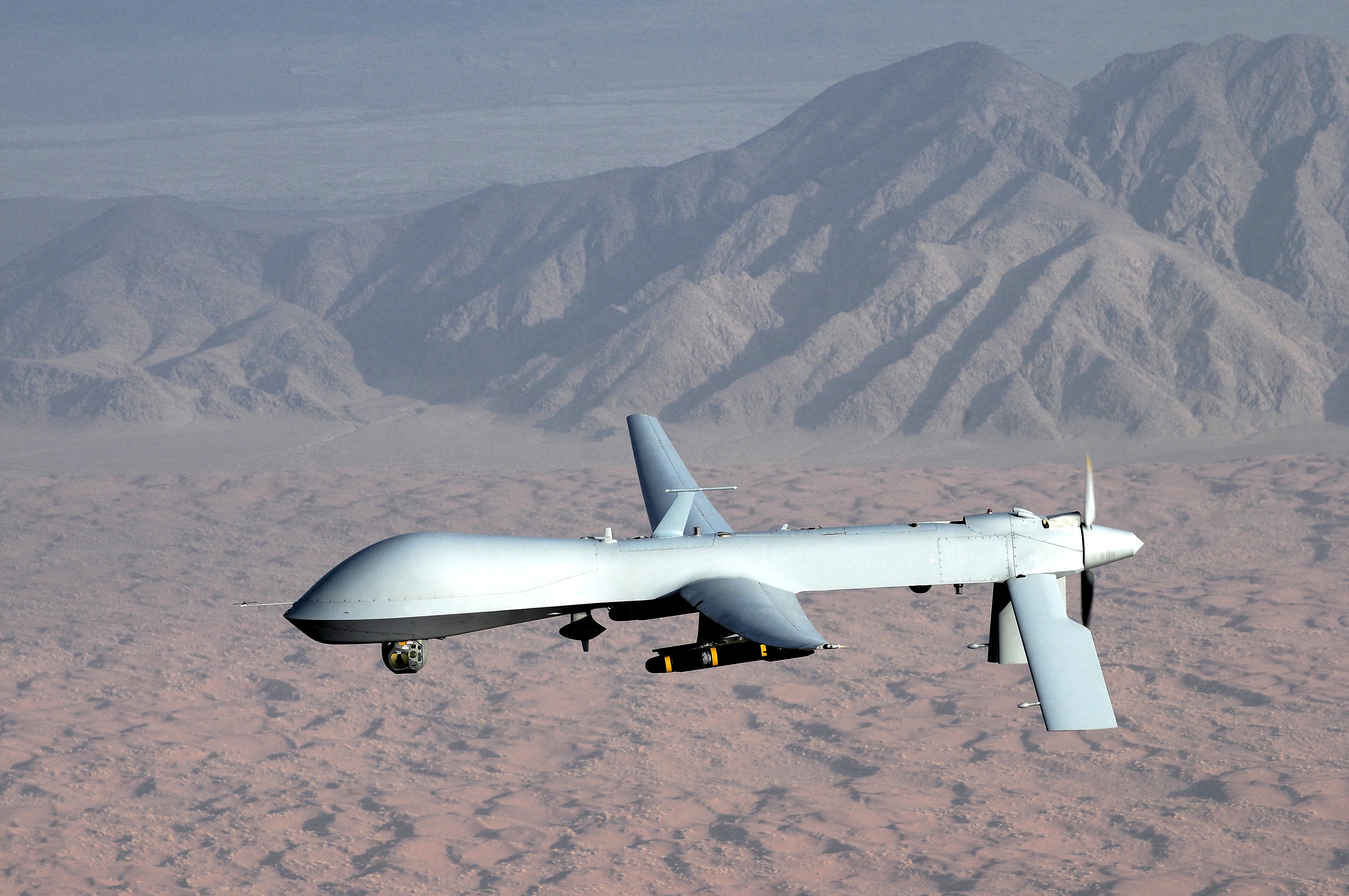
A U.S. Air Force MQ-1 Predator drone

=== Drone strikes ===
Since 2009, the United States has led a drone campaign against AQAP, targeting both prominent leaders and lower-tier members. Though the first drone strike against an Al-Qaeda group in Yemen was conducted by the Bush administration in 2002, it was not until 2009 when President Barack Obama adopted drone strikes as a central component of the United States counterterrorism strategy. Obama's decision was influenced by both the Fort Hood shooting in November 2009 and the attempted bombing of Northwest Airlines flight 253 in December 2009, the latter which was directly conducted by AQAP. The first attack in the drone campaign was an airstrike on an AQAP camp in Al-Majalah on 17 December 2009. The attack reportedly killed 55 people; 14 AQAP fighters and 41 civilians. The U.S. intensified drone strikes in 2011 as AQAP gained significant ground in the backdrop of the Yemeni revolution. A drone strike on 30 September 2011 killed prominent American-Yemeni cleric Anwar Al-Awlaki, along with the main editor and publisher of AQAP's Inspire magazine, Samir Khan. U.S. drone strikes peaked in 2012 as in the same year the Obama administration approved the usage of "signature" strikes; the killing of individuals who exhibit "terrorist behaviour" of some sort. During this year, President Abdrabbuh Mansur Hadi ascended to office, lauding America's campaign and voicing his support for drone strikes amid an offensive against AQAP's emirates. Drone strikes decreased through 2014 but re-escalated in 2015 following the breakout of the Yemeni civil war and AQAP's vast seizure of territory. U.S. drone strikes killed several AQAP leaders during this period including Harith Al-Nadhari in January 2015, Ibrahim Al-Rubaysh in February 2015 and Nasser bin Ali Al-Ansi in May 2015. A drone strike on 16 June 2015 killed AQAP leader Nasser Al-Wuhayshi.

The administration of Donald Trump further expanded the drone campaign upon his inauguration in 2017. Trump loosened the rules of engagement concerning American operations and labeled three governorates in Yemen as "areas of active hostilities". From 2–6 March 2017, the U.S. conducted 25-40 drone strikes across Yemen targeting AQAP. In 2019 Trump revoked an executive order set by Obama requiring the publishing of civilian deaths in a drone strike. According to UK-based watchdog group Airwars, 'From mid 2019 onwards, covert and clandestine actions in Yemen appear to have dominated US engagements.', though the official number of drone strikes in 2019 was considerably lower than that of previous years. The reduction in drone strikes continued into 2020 as the Trump administration seemed to shift away from counter-terrorism as a primary focus of U.S. foreign policy. Despite this, the drone campaign continued to significantly affect AQAP's operational capacity, such as with a drone strike on 31 January 2020 which killed AQAP leader Qasim Al-Raymi. The Joe Biden administration further de-escalated the drone campaign, revoking Yemen's classification as a "theater of active armed conflict" in 2021. The most recent drone strike reportedly conducted by the U.S. was on 26 February 2023. According to New America, the drone campaign has killed over 1,000 people, and has 'weakened the organization's [AQAP's] ability to maintain its internal cohesion' according to ACLED. Critics of the drone campaign have argued that drone strikes have increased anti-Americanism and anti-government sentiment in the local populace of Yemen and has helped AQAP in gaining recruits.

=== Ground operations ===
In addition to drone strikes, the U.S. has conducted several ground raids against AQAP, mostly utilizing DEVGRU Navy SEALs. On 26 November 2014, DEVGRU collaborated with Yemeni special forces in a hostage rescue mission to free American journalist Luke Somers, along with multiple other hostages held by AQAP. The mission took place in northern Hadhramaut, along the border with Saudi Arabia. The team engaged AQAP in a firefight near a cave housing the hostages, killing seven militants. The raid rescued eight hostages of various nationalities, but they did not include Somers, who was moved to another area alongside four other hostages days before the raid. Later in December, AQAP published a video threatening to kill Somers within 72 hours of its release. Another rescue mission subsequently occurred on 6 December 2014 in southern Shabwah. Forty SEALs backed by Yemeni special forces attempted to infiltrate the AQAP compound housing the targets, but they were spotted about 100 metres away, leading to heavy skirmishes. Upon entering the compound, two hostages, including Somers, were found shot, while the three other hostages were missing. Both shot hostages eventually died while being transported.

On 29 January 2017, DEVGRU conducted a raid in Al-Ghayil, a town in the Yakla region of Al-Bayda. The raid was authorized in order to collect key AQAP documents and information, as well as the possibility of neutralizing AQAP leader Qasim Al-Raymi, whom UAE intelligence suggested could be present. Originally meant to be unexpected, AQAP prematurely detected the SEALs, eventually leading to a heavy firefight in the village which claimed the life of one American soldier and wounded five others. Fourteen AQAP fighters were killed along with "valuable information" being gathered, but Al-Raymi was not killed or captured in the raid. Additionally, at least 16 civilians were killed, including the eight-year-old daughter of Anwar Al-Awlaki, Nawar. On 23 May 2017, DEVGRU conducted another raid against AQAP in Ma'rib governorate, targeting a compound of the group using 'a combination of small arms fire and precision airstrikes' in order to gather intelligence. The U.S. reported the deaths of seven AQAP members and no civilians casualties, however UK-based human rights group Reprieve reported that the raid had killed five civilians and wounded six, with SEALs killing a blind villager as he walked out of his home and killing four more after they began arguing with them after the fact.

== Senior leaders and members ==
=== Current leaders ===
Name	Position	Situation
Sa'ad bin Atef Al-Awlaki	Emir	Succeeded Khalid Batarfi as leader of AQAP since March 2024.; Emir of Shabwah
Ammar Al-San’ani	Military commander	Military commander since 2018.
Ibrahim Al-Banna	Chief of security	AQAP chief of security since at least 2015.; Reportedly was AQAP media chief until at least 2011.; Founding member of AQAP and provides military and security guidance to AQAP leadership.
Abdullah Mubarak	Religious leader	Appointed as shari'a official in October 2017.; Succeeded Ibrahim Al-Rubaysh, who was killed in April 2015.
Ibrahim al Qosi	Senior sharia official	AQAP spokesperson and shura council member.; Joined AQAP in 2014.; Detained at Guantanamo Bay from January 2002 to July 2012 before being transferred to Sudan as part of a plea bargain.

=== Former leaders ===
Name	Position	Situation
Nasir Al-Wuhayshi †	Emir and founder of AQAP	Founder and former emir of AQAP from 2009 to 2015.; Deputy Emir and general manager of Al-Qaeda.; Killed in a drone strike in June 2015.
Qasim Al-Raymi †	Emir and military commander	Succeeded Nasir Al-Wuhayshi as leader of AQAP from 2015 to 2020.; Military commander from 2009 until appointment as emir.; In 2007, he and AQAP leader Nasir Al-Wuhayshi announced the emergence of Al-Qaeda in Yemen (AQY), AQAP's predecessor group.; Killed in a drone strike in late January 2020.
Khalid Batarfi#	Emir and senior commander	Succeeded Qasim Al-Raymi as leader of AQAP from 2020 to 2024.; Emir of Abyan from 2010 until being captured in March 2011.; Freed in 2015 during the Battle of Mukalla, where he would then be appointed emir of Hadhramaut from 2015 until appointment as emir.; Died in March 2024.
Said Ali Al-Shihri †	Deputy emir	Deputy emir from 2009 to 2013 and highest ranking Saudi Arabian in AQAP.; Former detainee at Guantanamo Bay until released to Saudi Arabia in November 2007.; Killed in a drone strike in July 2013.
Ibrahim Sulayman Muhammad Al-Rubaysh †	Religious leader	Reported to be AQAP's mufti.; 'Main ideologue and theological adviser' of AQAP.; Also served as a senior advisor for AQAP operational planning, and was involved in the planning of attacks.; Detaineed at Guantanamo Bay until December 2006 when he was handed over to Saudi Arabian authorities, he subsequently escaped to Yemen.; Killed in a drone strike in April 2015.
Ibrahim Al-Asiri †	Chief bombmaker	Explosives expert and weapons specialists for AQAP.; Reported to have been responsible for making the bombs used by his brother Abdullah Al-Asiri in his suicide bombing, the attempted bombing of Northwest Airlines flight 253 in 2009, the 2010 cargo plane bomb plot, and 2012 bomb plot.; Killed in a drone strike in late 2017.
Anwar Al-Awlaki †	Chief of external operations	Senior recruiter and involved in organizing external operations to be conducted for AQAP.; Killed in a drone strike in September 2011.
Samir Khan †	Editor and publisher of Inspire magazine	Editor and publisher of Inspire, an English digital magazine published by AQAP.; Killed in a drone strike in September 2011.
Nasser bin Ali Al-Ansi †	Senior sharia official	Senior shari'a official and military strategist.; Appeared in videos claiming responsibility for capture and death of Luke Somers and the Charlie Hebdo shooting.; Killed in a drone strike in April 2015.
Harith bin Ghazi Al-Nadhari †	Senior sharia official	Senior ranking Shari'a official within AQAP.; He rebuked the Islamic State announcement of expanding their caliphate into Yemen and renewed loyalties to Al-Qaeda and its leader, Ayman Al-Zawahiri.; Killed in a drone strike in January 2015.
Muhammad Sa'id Ali Hasan †	Operational commander	Senior military commander.; Logistical and financial manager.; Killed in a drone strike in April 2012.
Fahd Al-Quso †	Operational commander	Wanted by the United States for his involvement in the USS Cole bombing.; Killed in a drone strike in May 2012.
Shawki Al-Badani †	Operational commander	Played a key role in a plan for a major attack in summer 2013 that led the United States to close 19 diplomatic posts across the Middle East and Africa.; Killed in a drone strike in November 2014.
Othman Ahmad Othman Al-Ghamdi †	Operational commander	Involved in raising funds for the organization's operations and activities in Yemen.; He first appeared in a video released in May 2010, where he was identified publicly as AQAP's operational commander.; Former detainee at Guantanamo Bay detention camp from April 2006 to June 2006 until he was handed over to Saudi Arabian authorities and subsequently released.; Killed in a drone strike in Yemen in February 2015.; AQAP confirmed his death in September 2018.
Mohamed Atiq Awayd Al Harbi (surrendered)	Field commander	Former detainee at Guantanamo Bay until released to Saudi Arabia in November 2007.; Surrendered to Saudi authorities in Yemen in February 2009.
Jalal Bala'idi †	Field commander	Also known as 'Abu Hamza'; Leader of Ansar Al-Sharia from 2011 to 2016.; Field commander of AQAP in Abyan, Shabwa, Lahij, Hadhramaut, and Al-Bayda governorates.; Joined AQAP in 2011.; Killed in a drone strike in February 2016.

== See also ==
- Ansar Al-Sharia (Yemen)
- Al-Malahem Media
- Islamic Emirate of Yemen
- Inspire (magazine)
- Drone strikes in Yemen
- List of armed groups in the Yemeni civil war
- Terrorist incidents attributed to Al-Qaeda in the Arabian Peninsula
- Anders Cameroon Østensvig Dale (an imprisoned alleged member)

== Bibliography ==
- Johnsen, Gregory (2012). The Last Refuge: Yemen, al-Qaeda, and America's War in Arabia, Scribe, Melbourne. ISBN 9781922070012.
