= Battle of Mukalla (2015) =

Battle of the Yemeni Civil War

First Battle of Mukalla (2015)
- Part of the Yemeni Civil War (2014–present)
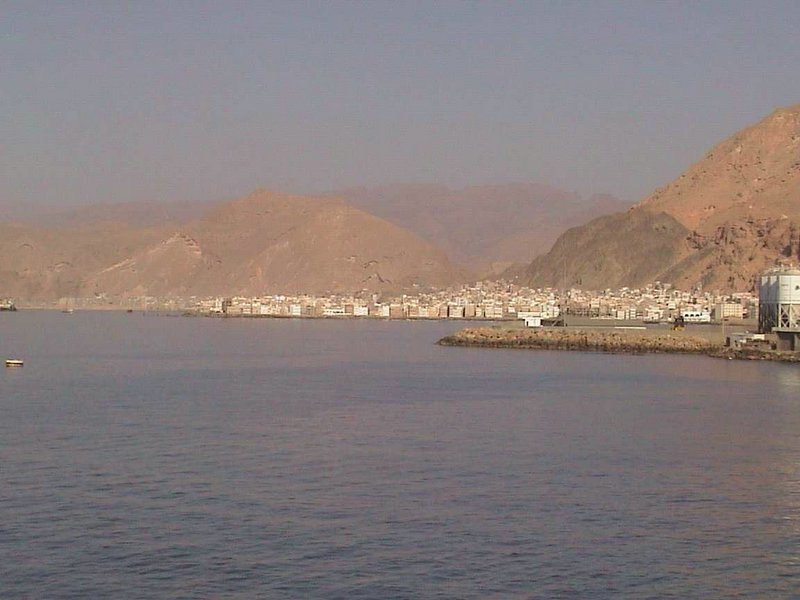
- Mukalla as seen from the Indian Ocean.
Date	2–16 April 2015 (2 weeks)
Location	Mukalla, Yemen 14.533333°N 49.133333°E
Result	AQAP victory

Belligerents
Al-Qaeda: AQAP	Yemen Army: People's Committees; Popular resistance; Hadhramaut Tribal Alliance

Commanders and leaders
Khalid Batarfi; Ibrahim Sulayman Muhammad Arbaysh †	(Yemen) Major General Mohsen Nasser Qasim Hassan Sheikh Abdul Hadi al-Tamimi

Casualties and losses
8+ killed	7+ killed 1+ killed
- 2+ civilians killed
- Location within Yemen

The First Battle of Mukalla (2015) was a battle between al-Qaeda in the Arabian Peninsula, local tribesmen, and the Yemen Army for control of the coastal city of Mukalla, Yemen.

== Battle ==
At the end of the March, many Hadi loyal soldiers and forces from the Southern Provinces were sent to the front to fight the Houthis, after a Saudi led-Coalition started an operation to aid the Hadi government in capturing Sana'a. AQAP took advantage of the situation, launching a full-scale attack after years of insurgency in the governorate, to take Mukalla, the provincial capital. Al-Qaeda fighters entered Mukalla on 2 April 2015, seizing control of several government buildings, including the presidential palace. They attacked the city's central prison with rocket-propelled grenades, freeing 300 inmates, including a number of captured militants, also freeing a senior commander, Khalid Batarfi. They also attacked the local branch of the central bank. The group reportedly faced little resistance as it took control of the city. After that, it was reported that Hadi loyalists aided by the Southern Movement retook control of the port of Mukalla, after fighting killed and injured people on both sides. As of the morning of April 3, Hadi loyals were still in control of the army camps, and the airport, in addition to the port. About 500 AQAP fighters were setting checkpoints and bases in their captured areas. In the evening, AQAP fighters stormed the port, and headquarters of the second military zone. The last remaining Yemen Army troops were driven out by mortar fire on 3 April, as the militants occupying the city consolidated their grip. One of the leading al-Qaeda prisoners sprung from prison, Khalid Batarfi, posed for pictures disseminated through social media in the Mukalla presidential palace.

The Washington Post compared the prison break to the escape of 23 jihadists, including future AQAP emir Nasir al-Wuhayshi, from a Saudi prison in 2006, a formative event for the group.

On 4 April, Hadhramaut Governorate tribesmen took over two deserted army bases in Ash Shihr and Riyan, near Mukalla. They then entered Mukalla itself in technicals. At the same time, fighters from the Hadrami tribal alliance, entered the port to fight AQAP.

There were conflicting accounts of the situation on 5 April, with the Yemen Times reporting that anti-AQAP tribal fighters surrounded the city but were unable to enter it and Reuters reporting that the tribesmen were successful in retaking much of the city from the jihadists, pushing the al-Qaeda fighters out, although the militants reportedly remained in some neighbourhoods. One tribal fighter and two soldiers were reportedly killed in clashes between tribesmen and Yemeni Army soldiers on 5 April.

The Yemen Observer reported on 7 April, citing "tribal sources", that the Hadhramaut Tribal Alliance and militiamen loyal to the embattled president Abd Rabbuh Mansur Hadi were successful in retaking Mukalla. However, Reuters cited local residents as saying that al-Qaeda remained in control of about half of the city. In 12 April, a drone strike killed 7 AQAP fighters in one of their gatherings in Mukalla. One of those killed was Ibrahim Sulayman Muhammad Arbaysh.

Al-Qaeda-affiliated militants calling themselves the Sons of Hadhramaut seized an oil terminal and infantry base in Mukalla on 16 April, as well as an air defense base and military airport on the city's outskirts. Yemeni troops reportedly deserted their posts to avoid a fight with the militants. The jihadists also captured a massive weapons depot that contained dozens of tanks, Katyusha rocket launchers and small arms. With this advance, Al-Qaeda consolidated its hold on Hadhramaut province.

== Related incidents ==
An apparent United States drone strike killed an al-Qaeda leader and spokesman, Ibrahim al-Rubeish, to the west of Mukalla on 12 April. The airstrike was the first carried out by the United States since it abandoned Al Anad Air Base during the previous month. Al-Rubeish was a former Guantanamo Bay detainee who had been released in 2006, after five years in the military prison camp.

About 4,000 soldiers in the 135th Brigade based in Hadhramaut switched sides, announcing their support for Hadi after previously backing Saleh and the Houthis, on 16 April. Days later, on 19 April, Brigadier General Abdulrahman al-Halily declared the support of the First Military District and at least 15,000 troops belonging to it for Hadi.

In an apparent error by the Arab Coalition Forces, over 70 soldiers loyal to President Abdo Rabu Mansur Hadi were killed and 200 wounded by shelling during the night of 8 July.

== See also ==
- Battle of Mukalla (2016)
- Fall of Mosul
