= Sa'ad bin Atef al-Awlaki =

Yemeni al-Qaeda member and leader

Sa’ad bin Atef al-Awlaki
- سعد بن عاطف العولقي
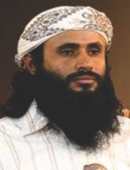
- Sa'ad in 2015

4th Emir of al-Qaeda in the Arabian Peninsula
- Incumbent
- Assumed office 10 March 2024
- Preceded by: Khalid Batarfi

Personal details
- Born: 1978, 1981 or 1983 Shabwah Governorate, South Yemen
- Military career
- Allegiance: Al-Qaeda: AQAP
- Rank: Emir

Sa'ad bin Atef al-Awlaki (Arabic: سعد بن عاطف العولقي) also known by the alias Abu Al-Laith, is a Yemeni militant and the current emir of Al-Qaeda in the Arabian Peninsula, succeeding Khalid Batarfi.

== Life ==
Al-Awlaki was born in Al-Shu'bah in Wadi Yasbam in the Al-Saeed District in Shabwa Governorate from the al-Awlaki tribe in 1978, 1981 or 1983.

Before his leadership of Al-Qaeda in the Arabian Peninsula, he was a member of AQAP's shura council.

The Yemeni military falsely claimed to have killed al-Awlaki on 7 May 2014, during their offensive in southern Yemen.

After the death of Khalid Batarfi, al-Awlaki was appointed as the new leader of Al-Qaeda in the Arabian Peninsula through AQAP's media group, Al-Malahem Media, on March 11, 2024, which involved a statement reading by Abu Khubaib al-Sudani. Before al-Awlaki officially led the group, throughout 2019 till the death of Batarfi, he and al-Awlaki both led conflicting sectors of AQAP. According to the United Nations, this conflict was due to Batarfi's disliking for Southern Yemeni tribes and al-Awlaki's support for them.

The United States program, Rewards for Justice, put a USD$6 million bounty on al-Awlaki. This bounty was increased to $10 million in 2025.
