= Coles Creek =

Coles Creek may refer to:

== Australia ==
- Coles Creek, Queensland, a locality in the Gympie Region

== United States ==
- Coles Creek culture, a Late Woodland archaeological culture in the southern United States
- Coles Creek (Mississippi), a tributary of the Mississippi River
- Coles Creek (Pennsylvania), a tributary of Fishing Creek
- Coles Creek State Park, in St. Lawrence County, New York

== See also ==
- Cole Creek (disambiguation)
