= Harith bin Ghazi al-Nadhari =

Al Qaeda official (died 2015)

- Harith bin Ghazi al-Nadhari refuting the Islamic State expansion into Yemen, on behalf of AQAP.
- Born: Yemen
- Died: 31 January 2015; Yemen
- Cause of death: US Drone strike
- Citizenship: Yemen
- Occupation: militant
- Years active: until 2015
- Military career
- Allegiance: AQAP
- Service years: until 2015
- Conflicts: Yemeni Civil War

Harith bin Ghazi al-Nadhari (Arabic: حارث غازي النظاري Ḥāriṯ Ghāzī an-Naẓārī; died 31 January 2015) was a senior sharia official of the Al Qaeda in the Arabian Peninsula (AQAP) based in Yemen.

Al-Nadhari has featured in many of AQAP's propaganda videos such as rebuking the Islamic State announcement of expanding their caliphate into Yemen and renewing loyalties to al-Qaeda Emir Ayman al-Zawahiri. In his address, al-Nadhari stated "The announcement of the caliphate for all Muslims by our brothers in the Islamic State did not meet the required conditions. The policy of our brothers in the Islamic State split the ranks of the mujahideen, and scattered them, in this sensitive phase in the history of the mujahid ummah [community]. This is one of the absolutely forbidden matters in the religion of Allah.".

On 9 January, a speech of Harith bin Ghazi al-Nadhari claimed AQAP's responsibility for the Charlie Hebdo shooting in Paris, citing the motive as "revenge for the honor" of Muhammad.

On 31 January 2015 al-Nadhari and three other AQAP militants were killed by a U.S. drone strike.
