= Khalid Batarfi =

Saudi al-Qaeda member (died 2024)

Khalid Saeed Batarfi
- خالد سعيد باطرفي
- Batarfi appearing in an AQAP video

3rd Emir of al-Qaeda in the Arabian Peninsula
- In office 29 January 2020 – 10 March 2024
- Preceded by: Qasim al-Raymi
- Succeeded by: Sa'ad bin Atef al-Awlaki

Personal details
- Born: Between 1978 and 1980 Riyadh, Saudi Arabia
- Died: c. 10 March 2024 Yemen
- Known for: Emir of AQAP
- Military career
- Allegiance: AQAP (2010–2024)
- Service years: 2010–2024
- Rank: Supreme commander (Emir) of Abyan (2010–2011) Field commander in Hadramaut (2015–2020) Emir of AQAP (2020–2024)
- Conflicts: Yemen Insurgency: Battle of Zinjibar; Yemeni Civil War: Battle of Mukalla (2015); Battle of Mukalla (2016)

Khalid Saeed Batarfi (Arabic: خالد سعيد باطرفي, romanized: Khālid Saʿīd Bāṭarfī; 1978 to 1980 – c. 10 March 2024), also known as Abū al-Miqdād al-Kindī (Arabic: أبو المقداد الكِنْدِي), was a Saudi militant and the emir of al-Qaeda in the Arabian Peninsula. He oversaw the Yemen-based group's media network and led jihadist fighters in their takeover of Yemen's Abyan Governorate in 2011, where he was accorded the position of emir. He also reputedly carried out terrorist attacks in the Abyan and Hadhramaut governorates.

On 17 March 2011, Batarfi was captured by security forces in the Taiz Governorate. For four years, he was imprisoned in Mukalla. He was freed, along with about 300 other inmates, by al-Qaeda fighters on 2 April 2015, during the Battle of Mukalla. The Washington Post compared the Mukalla prison break to the escape of 23 fighters, including future AQAP emir Nasir al-Wuhayshi, from a Yemeni prison in 2006, a formative event for the group.

Batarfi attracted media attention when he posed for photographs taken by al-Qaeda members in the Hadhramaut governor's palace, which fighters took over.

Batarfi was promoted to leader after the death of Qasim al-Raymi in January 2020. In February 2021, the United Nations claimed that Batarfi was arrested during a security operation in Al Ghaydah in October 2020. However, Batarfi later appeared in a video discussing the 6 January 2021 riot at the U.S. Capitol.

The U.S. Rewards for Justice Program offered up to $5 million in exchange for information leading to Batarfi's apprehension.

AQAP announced Batarfi's death on 10 March 2024 and named Sa'ad bin Atef al-Awlaki as his successor. It did not give a cause of death for Batarfi.
