= Cole Creek (Missouri River tributary) =

Stream in Missouri, United States

Cole Creek is a stream in northern Gasconade County in the U.S. state of Missouri. It is a tributary of the Missouri River.

The stream headwaters arise about one mile east of Gasconade and about one mile south of the Missouri River at 38°40′05″N 91°32′05″W. The stream flows to the northeast for about two miles roughly parallel to the Missouri. It then turns north to its confluence with the Missouri at 38°41′42″N 91°29′32″W two miles west of Hermann.

The namesake of Cole Creek is unknown.

== See also ==
- List of rivers of Missouri
