= Cole Creek (Prairie Fork tributary) =

Stream in the U.S. state of Missouri

Coordinates: 38°50′47″N 91°36′30″W

Cole Creek is a stream in Callaway and Montgomery counties in the U.S. state of Missouri. It is a tributary of Prairie Fork of the Loutre River.

The stream headwaters arise in eastern Callaway County at and flows northeast to its confluence with Prairie Fork in western Montgomery County at .

Cole Creek has the name of a pioneer citizen.

== See also ==
- List of rivers of Missouri
