= Battle of Mukalla (2016) =

Battle of the Yemeni Civil War

Coordinates: 14.5350°N 49.1235°E

Second Battle of Al Mukalla
- Part of the Yemeni Civil War (2014–present) and the Saudi Arabian-led intervention in Yemen
Date	24–25 April 2016 (1 day)
Location	Mukalla, Hadramaut, Yemen
Result	Coalition victory

Belligerents
AQAP	Yemen; United Arab Emirates; United States (airstrikes); Supported by: Saudi Arabia

Commanders and leaders
Qasim al-Raymi; Khalid Batarfi; Mamoun Abdulhamid Hatem †; Sa'ad bin Atef al-Awlaki; Mohammed Saleh al-Orabi	Faraj Salmin Al-Bahsani (then-commander of the Second Military Region) (United Arab Emirates) Musallam Al Rashidi (Commander of UAE Force in Hadhramout) (Saudi Arabia) Auni Al Qurni (Deputy commander of KSA Special Forces in Yemen)

Units involved
AQAP fighters	Yemeni Armed Forces: Hadhrami Elite Forces

Strength
1,000+ fighters	2,000 soldiers

Casualties and losses
91 killed 30 wounded (by airstrikes); 100–800 killed (ground offensive, Saudi coalition claims); 8–250 captured 10 killed (AQAP claims during ground offensive); Total losses: 137–1,171	27 killed 60 wounded Total losses: 87
- 2 Saudi citizens executed by AQAP; 4 civilians killed by drone strike 8 civilians killed by air strike (AQAP claim); Total: 14 civilians killed

The Second Battle of Mukalla refers to an armed conflict between al-Qaeda in the Arabian Peninsula (AQAP) and the Saudi-led Coalition. The aim of the coalition offensive was to disable the newly resurgent al-Qaeda Emirate in Yemen by recapturing its capital, Mukalla. The battle led to a coalition victory, in which the coalition forces gained control of Mukalla and the surrounding coastal areas.

== Background ==
Mukalla is the provincial capital of the Hadhramaut Governorate and the fifth largest city in Yemen. The city and most of the Southern province around it fell to Al-Qaeda control during an Al-Qaeda offensive there in early April 2015. The Islamist group eventually captured Mukalla, leading them to a new headquarter for the group, and allowing Al-Qaeda to steal more than 200 million American dollars from the Mukalla central bank, and to free more than 300 of its fighters from the provincial prison. After the takeover, the United States conducted many airstrikes against the group killing a large number of them.

=== US drone strikes ===
The first incident was reported on May 11, 2015, when a U.S. drone strike killed four AQAP militants traveling in a car around the Mukalla, including the commander Mamoun Abdulhamid Hatem. AQAP confirmed Hatem's death in September 2018.

On June 10, 2015, suspected drone strikes attacked and killed three AQAP fighters, including a commander, at the Mukalla port. Six days later, on June 16, AQAP confirmed that a U.S. drone strike had killed its AQAP Emir, Nasir al-Wuhayshi, and that it had replaced him with the group's military chief, Qasim al-Raymi. A day after Nasir's death, AQAP executed two Saudi citizens in its territory after accusing them of being spies of U.S. and helping them to find the location of the AQAP leaders.

On June 25, a U.S. drone strike killed four AQAP militants - including a commander - inside their car outside an AQAP training facility in Mukalla. Another strike hit nearby, but no casualties were reported.

On July 3, four AQAP fighters were killed by a U.S. drone strike inside an army base.

On July 10, U.S. drone strikes killed 10 AQAP fighters inside a vehicle also carrying a container loaded with weapons, including three senior leaders among the dead.

On August 12, a U.S. drone strike killed five AQAP members inside a car, when they were traveling to Mukalla.

On September 9, 2015, suspected U.S. drone strikes targeted a group of AQAP militants in the Riyan Airport near Mukalla. Reports said that two to four militants were killed, along with four civilians. Some days later, on September 12, five AQAP fighters were killed in another U.S. drone strike inside Mukalla.

On March 23, 2016, a U.S. airstrike killed more than 50 AQAP fighters in a camp in Mukalla at dinner time, and injured more than 30.

== The battle ==
=== UAE-led ground offensive ===
On April 24, 2016, UAE soldiers entered Mukalla, successfully killing around 30 AQAP fighters. On the same day, Al-Qaeda fighters began withdrawing from the city to other parts of Hadramaut Province. This occurred after negotiations with local tribesmen and clerics, allegedly to avoid injury to civilians and destruction of the city from attacks against AQAP fighters. By April 25, Pro-Hadi Government forces and UAE forces had fully recaptured Mukalla, along with the rest of the coastal regions of the Hadramaut Province. On the same day, coalition officials stated that more than 800 AQAP fighters had been killed in the fighting, but that number was disputed by Yemeni journalists who covered the event, who said that the group retreated after negotiations. By 26 April, Mukalla and the rest of the surrounding towns and cities had been cleared of AQAP forces.

US Defense Secretary James Mattis called the UAE-led operation a model for American troops, citing how the United Arab Emirates Armed Forces liberated the port of Mukalla from AQAP forces in 36 hours after being held by AQAP for more than a year.

=== US support ===
On 6 May, Navy Captain Jeff Davis, a Pentagon spokesman, confirmed that US forces were deployed near the city of Mukalla during the battle, Force Reconnaissance Marines and Special Forces soldiers, but did not disclose the number of troops.

== Aftermath ==
Following the battle, the UAE established a primary base of operations against AQAP in the liberated city. The special operations base has enabled the CIA and the Joint Special Operations Command (JSOC) to target AQAP's strongest cells in Yemen and allowed for an enhanced UAE-US cooperation against AQAP.
