= Nasser bin Ali al-Ansi =

Yemeni al-Qaeda leader

- Nasser bin Ali al-Ansi
- Born: October 1975; Taiz, Yemen
- Died: 21 April 2015 (aged 39); Mukalla, Yemen
- Cause of death: US Drone strike
- Citizenship: Yemen
- Education: Iman University
- Occupations: AQAP Officer, terrorist
- Years active: 1995–2015
- Military career
- Allegiance: (Bosnia and Herzegovina) El Mudžahid (1995); AQAP (1996–2015)
- Service years: 1995–2015
- Conflicts: Bosnian War; War in Afghanistan; Yemeni Civil War

Nasser bin Ali al-Ansi (October 1975 – 21 April 2015) was a senior leader of Al-Qaeda in the Arabian Peninsula (AQAP) based in Yemen. Al-Ansi appeared in many of AQAP's propaganda videos, claiming the kidnap of US photojournalist Luke Somers and the Charlie Hebdo attack in Paris. On 7 May 2015, AQAP announced that al-Ansi was killed in a US drone strike.

== Biography ==
In 1993, al-Ansi enrolled at the Iman University, which was headed by Sheikh Abdul Majid al-Zindani, a longtime ally of Osama bin Laden and al-Qaeda.

In 1996 he tried to fight in Kashmir, but the Pakistani authorities prevented him from doing so. Instead, he went to Afghanistan where he met senior al-Qaeda officials, Abu Hafs al-Masri and Saif al-Adel. Along with other al-Qaeda members, al-Ansi tried to join the Civil war in Tajikistan but failed to reach the country "due to the heavy snow".

He went home to Yemen in 1997, but returned to Afghanistan in 1998. He was received by Osama bin Laden, who sent him to Kabul and placed him as Emir of the Kabul Reception. Al-Ansi joined al-Qaeda's forces on the battlefield and was selected to participate in their most intense training course in Afghanistan, called the "Qualification of the Forces". Senior al-Qaeda leaders taught the course and among his trainees was Qasim al-Raymi, who is AQAP's military commander. Al-Ansi and al-Raymi received further training at the Al-Farouq camp.

In 2001, Bin Laden had al-Ansi travel to the Philippines, where he was to qualify the mujahideen in Sharia and militarily. That same year, al-Ansi assisted As-Sahab, al Qaeda's propaganda arm, in creating two productions: the "American Intervention" and the "State of the Islamic Ummah". After Al-Ansi completed his mission in the Philippines, he tried to return to Afghanistan after the US-led invasion of the country in the wake of the 9/11 attacks. Al-Ansi was detained in Yemen en route to Afghanistan in early 2002; Yemeni authorities released him after six months imprisonment.

After his release, he studied at the Iman University, where he received a certificate in Sharia jurisprudence. In addition to attending lectures at Iman, he preached among the youth and conducted some special training. Al-Ansi eventually became a senior official in AQAP, and attempted to convince the militant Jihadist Al Nusra Front and Islamic State of Iraq and the Levant (ISIL) groups in Syria to end their fighting and unite against the West.

In April 2015, he was killed by a US drone strike in Yemen with his eldest son.

== See also ==
- Al-Qaeda in Bosnia and Herzegovina
