= Cole Township =

Cole Township may refer to:

- Cole Township, Sebastian County, Arkansas, in Sebastian County, Arkansas
- Cole Township, Benton County, Missouri
