= Fahd al-Quso =

Yemeni militant (1974–2012)

- فهد القوصو
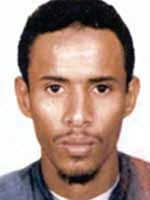
- Mugshot of al-Quso
- Born: Fahd Mohammed Ahmed al-Quso; 12 November 1974; Aden, South Yemen
- Died: 6 May 2012 (aged 37); Yemen
- Military career
- Allegiance: Al-Qaeda; Al-Qaeda in Yemen (2000–2009); AQAP (2009–2012)
- Service years: 1990s-2012
- Conflicts: al-Qaeda insurgency in Yemen

Fahd Mohammed Ahmed al-Quso (Note: Also known as Abu Huthaifah, Abu Huthaifah Al-Yemeni, Abu Al-Bara', Abu Hathayfah Al-Adani, Abu Huthaifah Al-Adani, Fahd Mohammed Ahmed Al-Awlaqi, Huthaifah Al-Yemeni, or Abu Huthaifah Al-Abu Al-Bara,) (Arabic: فهد القوصو; 12 November 1974 – 6 May 2012) was a Yemeni Islamist militant who was on the FBI Most Wanted Terrorists list. He was wanted by the FBI, Interpol, and the United States Department of State, which had offered 5 million dollars (approximately 1 billion Yemeni Rials) to anyone with information about him. He was killed by a US drone strike in Yemen on 6 May 2012.

== Militant activity ==
During the 1990s, al-Quso trained in Al-Qaeda camps in Afghanistan. In January 2000 al-Quso planned to meet co-conspirators of the USS Cole bombing in Singapore but he failed to get the proper travel visa and went to Bangkok, Thailand, to meet instead. In Bangkok he met with Tawfiq bin Attash (a.k.a. Kallad Bin Attash), and in Malaysia with 11 September hijackers of American Airlines Flight 77, Nawaf al-Hazmi and Khaled al-Mihdhar. Tawfiq bin Attash was known as Osama bin Laden's "run boy". Although he had a peg leg, he acted as an intermediary for bin Laden. Al-Quso confessed to acting as a bag-man and reported giving Attash $36,000 for a "new prosthetic leg" although it was probably used instead to pay al-Mihdhar's and al-Hazmi's travel expenses to the US. However, according to the "run boy" Attash, that amount was much less, between $10,000 and $12,000.

Osama bin Laden funded the USS Cole attack and Abd al Rahim al-Nashiri was the mastermind and "field commander." Jamal al-Badawi and Fahd Mohammed Ahmed al-Quso acted as "local al Qa'ida coordinators" who purchased equipment, including the boat to be used in the attack, obtaining funding and "operational direction" from Attash. The bombing of the USS Cole was in fact al-Nashiri's second attempt at launching a terrorist attack on a US vessel and he did so without approval from Osama bin Laden. The first attempt, in the port of Aden, Yemen, failed after the boat purchased by al-Badawi and al-Quso sunk before it could be detonated. The attack boat was driving towards the USS Sullivans in January 2000 but it sank before it could reach its target, so the attackers salvaged the boat and the explosives, and repaired it for a second try.

Following the botched attack, Osama bin Laden summoned al-Nashiri to a meeting in Afghanistan to discuss the failed operation, prompting al-Nashiri to order suicide bombers Hassan al-Khamri and Ibrahim al Thawar (a.k.a. Nibras) to attack the next "US warship" in the port before he left to meet bin Laden. The second attack did reach its target the USS Cole, on 12 October 2000, killing 17 people and wounding 40 others. However, the attack on the USS Cole failed to produce valuable propaganda footage for al Qa'ida since there was no one there to film it happening. Fahd Mohammed Ahmed al-Quso was ordered to film the attack from a nearby apartment for this very purpose but he over slept and did not wake up to film the attack.

Al-Quso was wanted for his participation in the bombing of the USS Cole and other terror related activities, including partially funding the 11 September 2001 attacks on the World Trade Center buildings in New York City. Al-Quso was indicted by the Southern District Court of New York on 15 May 2003, for his role in the USS Cole bombing that resulted in the deaths of 17 people and wounded 40 others.

Fahd Mohammed Ahmed al-Quso has been indicted by a federal grand jury and subsequently charged with 50 counts of terrorism offenses, including: "the murder of U.S. nationals and military personnel; murdering and conspiracy to kill United States nationals; conspiracy to murder United States Military personnel; murder and attempted murder of United States military personnel aboard the USS Cole; conspiracy to use weapons of mass destruction against nationals of the United States; use and attempted use of a weapon of mass destruction against nationals of the United States aboard the USS Cole; conspiracy to destroy buildings and property of the United States; damaging and destroying the USS Cole; conspiracy to attack National Defense Utilities; using and carrying an explosive as well as a dangerous device during the attack on the USS Cole; conspiracy to provide material support to a foreign terrorist organization; and providing material support to a foreign terrorist organization."

The Yemeni government arrested al-Quso within the first weeks of the attack on the USS Cole, but refused to allow the FBI to interrogate him. When FBI interrogators asked to speak with al-Quso about the Cole attack, Yemeni authorities stated that al-Quso had "sworn on the Koran that he was innocent of any crime" which apparently proved to Yemeni officials that he was innocent. It took FBI officials months of persistent requests before they were allowed to interrogate al-Quso, at which point he identified 11 September hijackers Nawaf al-Hazmi and Khaled al-Mihdhar in photographs taken in Malaysia. Then in April 2003 al-Quso along with 10 other suspects in the USS Cole bombing mysteriously escaped prison and was later recaptured in 2004.

A Yemeni judge finally sentenced al-Quso to ten years in prison in 2004 for his participation in the USS Cole attack. However he was secretly released by government officials in 2007. Al-Quso is reported to have appeared in a video released by AQAP "threatening to strike the U.S. homeland embassies and warships."

A picture of al-Quso surfaced with a Yemeni journalist Arafat Mudabish, who interviewed him for a story. Mudabish reports that "he lives in an isolated mountain area where there is no Yemeni government presence." He was also linked with the 2009 Christmas bombing over Detroit, as suspected bomber Umar Farouk Abdulmutallab visited him to discuss the plot and the workings of the bomb. Al-Quso was from the same tribe as radical U.S.-born cleric Anwar al-Awlaki, who had an operational role in the attack. On 7 December 2010 the United States Department of State designated al-Quso as a Specially Designated Global Terrorist under Executive Order 13224 which "blocks all al-Quso's property interests subject to U.S. jurisdiction and prohibits U.S. persons from engaging in transactions for the benefit of al-Quso." "He was also placed on the United Nations (UN) 1267 list of persons associated with al Qa'ida and the Taliban requiring all UN member states to implement an assets freeze, a travel ban, and an arms embargo against this individual."

== Death ==
Fahd Mohammed Ahmed al-Quso was killed by a CIA drone's missile in Yemen on 6 May 2012, as he exited a vehicle alongside another operative. U.S. officials confirmed his death, along with confirmation from an official statement by AQAP.

== See also ==
- Jamal Ahmad Mohammad Al Badawi
