= Al-Malahem Media Foundation =

Media wing of AQAP

Al Malahem Media Foundation
- مؤسسة الملاحم الاعلامية
- Formation: January 2009
- Headquarters: Yemen
- Official language: Arabic; English; French

Al-Malahem Media (AMM) (Arabic: الملاحم, romanized: al-malāḥim, lit. 'The battle/war') is the media wing of Al-Qaeda in the Arabian Peninsula. Located in Yemen, AMM uploads audio messages, online magazines and video series in Arabic, English, and French. AMM publishes multiple magazines, them being Sada al-Malahem (Arabic: صدى الملاحم, lit. 'Echoes of Battle') and Inspire, as well as the "From the field" video series.

== Sada al-Malahem ==
The main Arabic component of AMM's media wing is an online magazine known as Sada al-Malahem. Created in 2008 and published in a bimonthly fashion, the magazine is designed specifically to appeal broadly to Yemenis beyond class, tribe and regional identity. Their propaganda utilizes a "diagnosis" and "prognostic" framework in order to exploit the grievances of Yemenis, typically young males, and allocating blame as well as providing a clear answer to the issue. The "diagnosis" of the issue is aligned with the ideology of AQAP and al-Qaeda, though intertwined with the local issues in Yemen, leading to a local and global theme which both address the "far enemy", the United States, and the "near enemy", the local Arab governments who are propped up by it. Among these global issues include the Israeli-Palestinian conflict, while local issues usually focus on corruption, poverty, inadequate service provision and inequities in natural resource allocation. The group has also provided commentary on the Southern movement and Houthi insurgency, the former in a supportive though opportunistic manner in order to gather support from southern tribes, and latter in a hostile, sectarian manner. After defining the issue, the "prognostic" section usually advocates for jihad against the United States and the Arab governments as the answer to it.

== Inspire ==
In July 2010, AQAP launched Inspire, an English-language magazine targeted to Muslim audience in the Western world who cannot understand Arabic. The magazine features guides and instructions on how to conduct lone wolf terrorist attacks in the West, as well as general AQAP propaganda and bylines from prominent al-Qaeda figures such as Osama Bin Laden and Ayman al-Zawahiri. According to its late creator, editor and publisher Samir Khan, the magazine 'Tackle['s] issues that are not only happening abroad in the Muslim world, but also focus[es] on domestic issues pertinent to the Muslim community in the West', in addition to rehabilitating the image of AQAP and providing commentary on current issues and events. Inspire has been described as "a streamlined and seamless fusion of ideologically-driven material with pragmatic instructional and skillbuilding content." with the goal of motivating terrorism and providing readers with easy ways to conduct their own attacks, evident by each article featuring a section titled "Open Source Jihad." Critics and viewers have noted its difference in tone and design to other AQAP media such as Sala al-Mahalem, with an approach more oriented towards youth in the United States and other Western nations through its modern look and use of colloquial English as well as pop culture references. Reception to the magazine's first issue was largely skeptical from online jihadists due to its foreign presentation as well as technical issues, though opinions eventually grew more positive later on, with each issue amassing thousands of views and downloads on Islamist forums by 2014.

== Al-Masra ==
Al-Marsa is an AQAP newspaper launched in January 2016, running a total of 57 issues. The newspaper, published through Telegram, covers updates on the entire al-Qaeda network, as well as standard coverage of various world events, such as the shooting of Alton Sterling and the assassination of Jamal Khashoggi. The newspaper was Though the paper was initially meant to be released multiple times per month, hostile pressure on AQAP eventually led to it not releasing an issue since July 2017. Al-Masra eventually returned on 28 November, 2018, publishing a 58th issue and announcing their reformation as a 'periodical.' Since then, the newspaper has been dormant.

== Al-Badr Media Foundation ==
In May 2018, al-Badr Media Foundation announced its presence online. The group stated that its mission is to support AQAP by dispelling rumours about the group purported by Western and Arab media, encourage people to join AQAP, and increase "security awareness" within the group. Its first release on 24 May was a PDF detailing how to avoid detection and assassination from drone strikes.

== See also ==
- As-Sahab
- Inspire (magazine)
- Al-Qaeda in the Arabian Peninsula
