= Jamal Ahmad Mohammad Al Badawi =

Member of al-Qaeda (1960/63–2019)

Jamal Ahmad Mohammad Ali Al Badawi
- Mugshot of Jamal al-Badawi taken sometime before his 2003 escape
- Born: Jamal Ahmad Mohammad Ali Al Badawi; 1960 or 1963; Al-Shargian, Mukayras District, Al Bayda Governorate, Yemen
- Died: 1 January 2019; Ma'rib Governorate, Yemen
- Other names: Abu Abed Al Rahman Al-Badawi, Jamal Muhsin al-Tali, Abu Abdul Rahman al-Badawi, Abu Abdul Rahman al-Adani, Jamal Mohammad Ahmad Ali al-Badawi, Jamal Mohammad Ahmad
- Military career
- Allegiance: Al-Qaeda: Al-Qaeda in Yemen (1990s–2000)

Jamal Ahmad Mohammad Ali Al Badawi (Arabic: جمال أحمد محمد علي البدوي) (1960 or 1963 – 1 January 2019) was a Yemeni who was indicted as an accomplice for his role in the 2000 USS Cole bombing off the coast of Aden, Yemen, which killed 17 American sailors on 12 October 2000. He was captured in Yemen and sentenced to death on 29 September 2004. Al-Badawi was also indicted on 15 May 2003, by the United States for the USS Cole bombing and the attempted attack on USS The Sullivans. He is thought to have travelled to Saudi Arabia and purchased a small boat and then a truck and trailer to transport it. This boat sank from the weight of the explosives while preparing the USS The Sullivans plot. Al-Badawi is also thought to have leased the safehouses used in these endeavors. Fox News called Al-Badawi a "mastermind" of the Cole bombing.

Only two of the six charged by Yemen in the attack were sentenced to death; the other four were sentenced to 5–10 years imprisonment. After hearing his sentence, Al-Badawi declared "This is an unjust verdict, this is an American verdict. There are no human rights in the world, except for the Americans. All the Muslims in the world are being used to serve American interests." His family announced they would appeal. Because he was being held by U.S. forces, the other defendant sentenced to death, Abd al-Rahim al-Nashiri, was tried and sentenced in absentia.

Al-Badawi twice escaped from Yemeni prison, once after his death sentence was issued, and was being sought as an FBI Most Wanted Terrorist fugitive. He was killed by an American drone strike by a kinetic Hellfire variant with pop-up blades on 1 January 2019, that was conducted in Ma'rib Governorate, Yemen.

== Escape from Yemeni prison ==
Al-Badawi was one of the Cole defendants who had previously escaped from Yemeni custody during a prisoner transfer in April 2003, but he was later recaptured in March 2004.

By June 2003, al-Badawi had been added to the FBI Seeking Information - War on Terrorism list.

Once again in custody, al-Badawi was removed from FBI Seeking Information wanted list on 10 October 2004.

According to a BBC report, al-Badawi was one of 23 people who escaped from a Yemeni jail on 3 February 2006, 12 of them Al-Qaeda members.

On 23 February 2006, the U.S. FBI confirmed the latest escape, as they issued a national Press Release naming al-Badawi as one of the first new additions, since inception in 2001, to the FBI Most Wanted Terrorists list. He appeared on the FBI list with three new photos, including an enhanced black and white of the original grainy color photo. He was listed by the FBI on his new wanted poster under the name Jamel Ahmed Mohammed Ali Al-Badawi.

On 17 October 2007, al-Badawi surrendered to Yemeni authorities as part of an agreement with al-Qaeda militants. Following his surrender, Yemeni authorities released him in return for a pledge not to engage in any violent or al-Qaeda-related activity, despite a $5 million reward for his capture.

Al-Badawi was mentioned frequently during Guantanamo captive Abd Al Rahim Hussein Mohammed Al Nashiri's Combatant Status Review Tribunal.

== See also ==
- Fahd al-Quso
