= USS Cole =

USS Cole is the name of two ships of the United States Navy;

- USS Cole (DD-155), a Wickes-class destroyer, launched in 1919.
- USS Cole (DDG-67) an Arleigh Burke-class destroyer, launched in 1995.

== See also ==
- USS William C. Cole
- USS Cole bombing, a suicide attack against USS Cole (DDG-67) on 12 October 2000.
