= Cole Creek (South Dakota) =

Stream in South Dakota, United States

Coordinates: 44°23′28″N 103°52′29″W

Cole Creek is a stream in the U.S. state of South Dakota.

Cole Creek has the name of Dick Cole, a pioneer stagecoach operator.

== See also ==
- List of rivers of South Dakota
