= Ibrahim Sulayman Muhammad al-Rubaysh =

Militant and Al Qaida leader (1979-2015)

- Born: Ibrahim Sulayman Muhammad al-Rubaish; 7 July 1979; Buraidah, Saudi Arabia
- Died: 12 April 2015 (aged 35); Hadhramaut Governorate, Yemen
- Cause of death: Drone attack
- Criminal status: Detained at Guantanamo, repatriated in 2006 and placed on the Saudi most wanted list in 2009. Became senior leader in AQAP, killed in drone strike

Ibrahim Sulayman Muhammad al-Rubaish (July 7, 1979 – April 12, 2015) was a militant and a senior leader of Al Qaeda in the Arabian Peninsula (AQAP), who was held in extrajudicial detention in the United States's Guantanamo Bay detention camp in Cuba. He was released into the custody of Saudi Arabian authorities and then escaped in 2006. He became AQAP's mufti (expounder of Islamic law).

== Guantanamo detention ==
Al-Rubaish was captured near the Pakistan-Afghan border and transferred to Saudi Arabia on December 13, 2006.

When he was captured by the US army in 2001 for alleged connections to Al-Qaeda, he was a teacher in Pakistan, ultimately being released from Guantánamo in 2006, a time during which he wrote a famed poem, Ode to the Sea, which caused controversy in India when Calicut University included it in the BA second semester syllabus before eventually withdrawing it.

On February 3, 2009, Saudi security officials published a new list of Saudi suspected terrorists. Al-Rubaish was one of 11 of the 85 men on this list who was a former Guantanamo captive.

== AQAP's mufti ==
In November 2009, a research paper from the think tank The Jamestown Foundation asserted that al-Rubaish was now a mufti for Al Qaeda in the Arabian Peninsula (AQAP).

== Call for assassination of Saudi royals ==
The paper's author Murad Batal Al-Shishani asserted that Al-Rubaish had produced an audio tape Al-Qaida had released in September attempting to justify a recent attempt to assassinate a senior member of the Saudi Royal Family. The paper asserted Al-Rubaish had published a book criticizing Shaykh Salman al-Ouda, a critic of al Qaida's attacks on September 11, 2001. It also claimed that he had released an additional audio tape in November 2009, criticizing the Saudi government's introduction of mixed sex education for children.

== Repatriation and escape ==
ISN 192 -- Ibrahim Sulayman Muhammad Arbaysh's Guantanamo detainee assessment.

Al-Rubaish was transferred to Saudi Arabia on December 13, 2006, then escaped from custody and joined AQAP in Yemen, becoming a senior figure in the group.

== Call for jihad ==
In early 2013, al-Rubaish called for jihad against Americans, saying "It is my duty to spur the Muslims to kill the Americans, to get them out of the Muslims' land", also expressing hope that Sunnis would unite in a war against Shiite Iran.

== U.S. terrorist designation and reward ==
In October 2014, the U.S. State Department's Rewards for Justice program opened a US$5 million reward for Al-Rubaish's location. In December 2014, he was designated a Specially Designated Global Terrorist.

== Death ==
AQAP released a statement in April 2015 announcing that al-Rubaish had been killed with other unnamed individuals in a drone strike near Mukalla in April 2015. It is believed that the drone strike was carried out by the United States.

== Writings ==
Being "the main ideologue and theological adviser" of AQAP, "his writings and sermons were prominent in its publications."

== See also ==
- Poems From Guantánamo
