= Cole Creek (Pennsylvania) =

Stream in Pennsylvania, United States

Coordinates: 41°51′26″N 78°26′29″W

Cole Creek is a stream in McKean County, Pennsylvania, in the United States.

== History ==
Cole Creek was named for Squire Cole, a pioneer settler.

== See also ==
- List of rivers of Pennsylvania
