= Killing of Abdullah al-Mehdar =

2010 military operation in Yemen

- Part of the al-Qaeda insurgency in Yemen
- A house in al-Hawtah within the Kour mountain range
| Date | 12–13 January 2010 |
| Location | Al-Hawtah, Shabwah Governorate, Yemen 14°23′0.96″N 47°23′56″E |
| Result | Yemeni victory: Regional AQAP emir Abdullah al-Mehdar is killed; 25 militants escape from siege |

Belligerents
| Yemen | al-Qaeda in the Arabian Peninsula |

Commanders and leaders
| Unknown | Abdullah al-Mehdar † |

Units involved
| Yemeni Armed Forces; Yemeni Land Forces; 21st Mechanized Infantry Brigade; Military Police; Ministry of Interior; Central Security Organization; Central Security Forces; Rescue Police | Local cell |

Casualties and losses
| Per EFE: 1 killed (Note: 2 soldiers were killed and 4 were wounded in an AQAP ambush away from the fighting.) | 1 killed; 4 captured (including 2 wounded) |
- Location of al-Hawtah

On 12 January 2010, Yemeni security forces launched an operation in al-Hawtah, a village in Mayfa'a district, Shabwah Governorate, against a local cell of al-Qaeda in the Arabian Peninsula (AQAP) led by tribal chief Abdullah al-Mehdar. After besieging Mehdar and other militants in a house overnight, government forces stormed it on 13 January, killing Mehdar and capturing four other militants while the rest escaped. A Western official said the operation, which occurred in light of increased international concern about AQAP, signalled Yemeni dedication to intensifying efforts against the group. Locals criticized the operation and suggested the victims were not members of AQAP, although the group later confirmed Mehdar's role.

== Background ==
After al-Qaeda in the Arabian Peninsula (AQAP) nearly managed to bomb a passenger jet bound to the United States on 25 December 2009, international attention was drawn to its base of operations in Yemen. Coming under pressure to address the threat, the Yemeni government publicly asserted its capability to do so without American intervention despite skepticism from analysts. Yemen launched a heightened counterterrorism campaign against AQAP with increased support from the US.

A largely remote area with little federal government presence, Shabwah Governorate had served as a militant refuge for years, some aided by local tribes. Shabwah governor Ali Hasan al-Ahmadi suspected that dozens of militants, including Arab militants who fled from Afghanistan, were residing in the Kour, a mountain range in Shabwah. He also believed that AQAP leaders Nasir al-Wuhayshi and Said Ali al-Shihri were in the governorate. The government sent security reinforcements eastwards in the weeks prior to the operations as part of the intensified campaign.

On 12 January, foreign minister Abu Bakr al-Qirbi restated the government's offer of dialogue with militants who renounce violence, and that those who refused would continue to be hunted down. A foreign ministry official clarified details on the offer the next day, stating: "This would be within the framework of the rehabilitation programme for those who have been led astray, to stress the government's wish to open the door to those elements to return to reason".

=== Abdullah al-Mehdar ===
Abdullah Ahmad Abdullah Ba Yasin (Note: Arabic: عبدالله أحمد عبدالله با ياسين) (1965 – 13 January 2010), also known as Abdullah al-Mehdar (Note: Arabic: عبدالله محضار) or by the kunya Abu Abdulrahman, (Note: Arabic: أبو عبدالرحمن) was the sheikh of al-Faqih Ali, the preeminent family of the al-Hawtah village in Mayfa'a district, Shabwah. Possessing a high school-level education, he had been the sheikh of the family since the Yemeni civil war in 1994.

Yemeni officials believed Mehdar was planning to establish a militant training camp in the mountains of Shabwah (pictured)

Yemen's Ministry of Interior added Mehdar to a list of their most wanted AQAP members on 30 March 2009. He was believed to be AQAP's regional emir (commander) in Shabwah Governorate and was described as a "hard liner". Government officials said he sheltered and supported AQAP members, including foreigners, and was planning to construct a training camp in the mountains of Shabwah similar to one targeted in strikes the previous year in neighbouring Abyan Governorate. His cell also demanded gender-segregated education and threatened to destroy local mixed-sex schools.

== Raid ==
Yemeni security forces backed by the army launched a counterterrorism operation in al-Hawtah on 12 January 2010. Four units were dispatched; the army's 21st Mechanized Infantry Brigade and Military Police; as well as the Rescue Police and the Central Security Forces. They besieged a house where Mehdar and other militants had gathered and later barricaded themselves in. More than twenty-five militants were believed to be inside.

Unlike militants targeted in other operations, Mehdar refused to surrender despite tribal mediation. Clashes then erupted between the militants and government forces during the evening, which eventually subsided for several hours. Separately, a convoy of security forces heading to al-Hawtah as reinforcements for the operation was ambushed south of the provincial capital Ataq, leaving two soldiers dead and four injured. Officials believed the perpetrators were AQAP fighters loyal to Mehdar, and were attempting to divert government attention away from the siege.

Hours after the ambush, commandos raided the house at dawn on 13 January. Mehdar was killed in the fighting which "partly destroyed his home", according to an official. Four militants were captured, two of whom were wounded during a gun battle. Twenty-five militants managed to escape into the nearby mountains, prompting a manhunt. Security forces seized disguises and heavy weaponry inside the house, including a rocket-propelled grenade. BBC reported per Spanish news agency EFE that one soldier was killed in the fighting. No civilians were harmed.

== Aftermath ==
Governor Ahmadi announced the death of Mehdar later on 13 January. Security forces continued the search for the escaped militants into the next day. Yemen TV ran statements from military sources urging locals not to help AQAP and to assist security forces against them.

Yemen Post editor-in-chief Hakim Almasmari called the operation a success, and noted the security forces involved were specifically trained for counterterrorism missions by the United States. An anonymous Western official told The Christian Science Monitor that only Yemeni forces and intelligence were involved. They called Mehdar only "one piece of the Al Qaeda puzzle", but regarded the operation as a sign that the Yemeni government was committed to fighting AQAP. Foreign minister Qirbi said on 14 January that the government was "capable of tackling terrorist threats," and emphasized addressing economic and development issues in Yemen to the international community rather than strictly a military outlook. Security officials separately told news outlets that Yemen was engaged in "open war" with al-Qaeda.

A local council member of Mayfa'a district condemned the killing of Mehdar, claiming the operation was based on "incorrect information and reports regarding the people of al-Hawtah and their Sheikh" and caused panic among local residents. The tribal leader of the Mayfa'a area, Sheikh Atiq Baadha, said the victims "were young men who went astray" but not genuine al-Qaeda members. He regretted the government's lack of prior communication with local families and leaders for the surrender of the victims, warning that such actions could result in tribal sympathy for AQAP. The Guardian's Brian Whitaker noted difficulty in verifying the government's claims about Mehdar, writing: "the word in Yemen is that Mehdar was just a troublesome tribal figure who didn't join al-Qaida until he was dead." However, a video released on 26 May by al-Malahem Media Foundation, the media front of AQAP, acknowledged Mehdar's death and his role as the group's leader in Shabwah.

A funeral for Mehdar was held in al-Hawtah on 17 January, drawing a large number of residents. Tribal figures elected Sheikh Hussein Abdullah Bahahnah to succeed Mehdar as the leader of the al-Faqih Ali family. His inauguration on 14 March was attended by leaders of the local council and the General People's Congress in the district including Baadha. Mehdar's son was among the AQAP fighters killed in clashes during a military offensive in al-Hawtah waged later in September.
