= Yussef al-Shihri =

Saudi Arabian Guantanamo Bay detainee (1985–2009)

- Born: September 8, 1985; Riyadh Saudi Arabia
- Arrested: Fall 2001; Kunduz
- Released: November 25, 2007; Saudi Arabia
- Died: October 18, 2009 (aged 24); Jizan, Saudi Arabia
- Citizenship: Saudi Arabia
- Detained at: Guantanamo
- Other name: Yusef M Modaray
- ISN: 114
- Charge: No charge (held in extrajudicial detention)
- Status: Repatriated

Yussef Mohammed Mubarak al-Shihri (September 8, 1985 – October 18, 2009) was a citizen of Saudi Arabia who was held in extrajudicial detention in the United States's Guantanamo Bay detention camps, in Cuba. He was born on September 8, 1985, in Riyadh Saudi Arabia.

At the age of sixteen, he was captured along with his older cousin as part of a large group of 120 soldiers near Kunduz, and transferred to Shiberghan prison for six weeks, before being flown to Guantanamo on January 16, 2002.

On June 15, 2005, human rights lawyer Clive Stafford Smith identified al-Shihri as one of a dozen teenage boys held in the adult portion of the prison. According to Smith, al-Shihri was 13 years old when captured. Smith observed that official US documents referred to this dozen minors solely by their initials, because US law prohibits identifying minors. Official documents referred to Al Shihri as "YAS".

An October 2009 article in the Saudi Gazette asserts his older brother Saad Muhammad Al-Shehri took him to Afghanistan after he finished "intermediate school". Yussef Al-Shehri passed through the Saudi militant rehabilitation program following his repatriation from Guantanamo. He was named on Saudi Arabia's list of most wanted terrorist suspects on February 3, 2009. He was killed in a shootout with Saudi police, while apparently preparing to commit a suicide attack wearing an explosive belt on October 18, 2009.

== Combatant Status Review ==
A Summary of Evidence memo was prepared for the tribunal, listing the allegations that led to his detainment. His memo accused him of the following:

a. The detainee was a member of the Taliban.
1. The detainee is a citizen of Saudi Arabia who traveled to Pakistan and then to Afghanistan in April 2001 to fight with the Taliban.
2. Detainee stayed at a Taliban safe house operated by a Taliban commander who was seen in the presence of the Taliban Minister of Defense.
3. Detainee's brother is known al Qaeda operative.
4. Detainee considers Americans his enemy and will fight against them until he dies.

b. The detainee participated in military operations against the United States and its coalition partners.
1. Detainee met with the Taliban and said he was an Arab and wanted to fight.
2. Detainee received training with grenades and Kalishnikov.
3. Detainee spent five months at the front lines transporting food, ammunition, and burying the dead.

=== Administrative Review Board ===
Detainees whose Combatant Status Review Tribunal labeled them "enemy combatants" were scheduled for annual Administrative Review Board hearings. These hearings were designed to assess the threat a detainee might pose if released or transferred, and whether there were other factors that warranted his continued detention.

=== Second annual Administrative Review Board ===
A Summary of Evidence memo was prepared for Yusef M Modaray's second annual Administrative Review Board, on October 12, 2006. The memo listed factors for and against his continued detention.

== Repatriation ==
On November 25, 2008, the Department of Defense published a list of when captives left Guantanamo. According to that list he was repatriated to Saudi custody on November 9, 2007, with thirteen other men. The records published from the captives' annual Administrative Reviews show his repatriation was not the outcome of the formal internal review procedures. The records show his detention was not reviewed in 2007.

At least ten other men in his release group were not repatriated through the formal review procedure.

Peter Taylor writing for the BBC News called the Saudis repatriated on November 9, 2007, with al-Shihri, "batch 10". He wrote that the BBC's research had found this batch to be a problematic cohort, and that four other men from this batch were named on the Saudi most wanted list.

== Allegations of family connections with other suspected terrorists ==
After another former Saudi captive, Sa'id Ali Jabir Al Khathim Al Shihri, appeared in internet videos that threatened further attacks, an article in the Saudi Gazette reported that he had a brother-in-law, named "Yusuf al-Shihri", who was also a former Guantanamo captive. Said Ali Al Shihri married Yussef Al Shiri's sister after their repatriation from Guantanamo. Yussef's sister had two previous husbands. In a child custody dispute her first husband sought custody claiming the sister was a takfiri. He claimed her second husband had also been a militant, and that he was killed in a shootout with security officials in 2004.

During his CSR Tribunal, the allegations stated Yussef Mohammed Mubarak al-Shihri was captured with his cousin, in Kunduz, in northern Afghanistan.

After his death, the Saudi Gazette reported that two of his brothers, Faisal and Mustafa, and a cousin, Abdul Ghani Al-Shehri were imprisoned in at the Hai’er Prison on suspicion of terrorism.

== Named on Saudi Arabia's most wanted list ==
Yusuf al-Shihri, his brother-in-law Said al-Shihri, and a sixteen-year-old cousin, Abdullah al-Shihri, were named on a Saudi most wanted list on February 3, 2009.

== Reported the death of Fahd Al Jutayli ==
The Yemen Post reported on September 27 that Othman Al-Ghamedi and Yousuf al-Shahri had contacted their families requesting that they pass on news to the family of Fahd Saleh Sulaiman Al-Jatili that he had died during a military action by Yemeni security officials.

== Killed ==
Al Shihri, Raed al-Harbi, and a third man were killed at a border crossing while trying to enter Saudi Arabia from Yemen. The Associated Press reports the men were in possession of suicide belts when discovered. Al Shihri and al-Harbi were disguised in women's clothes when discovered. The three resisted arrest and one Saudi soldier was killed and another wounded. The third man, who was not in disguise, survived the firefight. His interrogation led to the capture of six Yemeni accomplices.

Saudi security officials reported on the arrest of 113 suspects in March 2010. The arrest of 101 of those individuals were reported to have started with the interrogation of al-Shiri's surviving companion.

== See also ==
- Minors detained in the War on Terror
- Al Joudi v. Bush
