= Mohamed Atiq Awayd Al Harbi =

Saudi Arabian Guantanamo detainee

- Said Ali Al Shiri and Mohamed Atiq Awayd Al Harbi and two other men appeared in an alarming video in January 2009
- Born: July 13, 1973 (age 53); Riyadh, Saudi Arabia
- Detained at: Guantanamo
- ISN: 333
- Charge: No charge (held in extrajudicial detention)
- Status: Released to Saudi custody
- Spouse: No

Mohamed Atiq Awayd Al Harbi is a citizen of Saudi Arabia formerly held in extrajudicial detention in the United States's Guantanamo Bay detention camps, in Cuba. His Guantanamo Internee Security Number was 333. The US Department of Defense reports that he was born on July 13, 1973, in Riyadh, Saudi Arabia.

Muhammad al Awfi was transferred to Saudi Arabia on November 9, 2007.

Independent counter-terrorism consultants at the SITE Institute assert a man identified as Abu Hareth Muhammad al-Oufi is actually Al Harbi.

== Combatant Status Review Tribunal ==
Combatant Status Review Tribunals were held in a 3 x 5 meter trailer. The captive sat with his hands and feet shackled to a bolt in the floor. Three chairs were reserved for members of the press, but only 37 of the 574 Tribunals were observed.

Initially the Bush administration asserted that they could withhold all the protections of the Geneva Conventions to captives from the war on terror. This policy was challenged before the Judicial branch. Critics argued that the USA could not evade its obligation to conduct competent tribunals to determine whether captives are, or are not, entitled to the protections of prisoner of war status.

Subsequently, the Department of Defense instituted the Combatant Status Review Tribunals. The Tribunals, however, were not authorized to determine whether the captives were lawful combatants—rather they were merely empowered to make a recommendation whether the captive had previously been correctly determined to match the Bush administration's definition of an enemy combatant.

=== Summary of Evidence memo ===
A Summary of Evidence memo was prepared for Combatant Status Review Tribunal on

a The detainee is associated with al Qaida.

1. Originally from Saudi Arabia, the detainee traveled extensively with little or no means of support throughout the Middle East and former Soviet Union during the period from 1999-2000.
2. The detainee states that he traveled from Saudi Arabia to Pakistan in November 2001 to assist Afghani refugees.
3. The detainee was arrested by Pakistan authorities at a checkpoint in the vicinity of Quetta, Pakistan.
4. The detainee's name was found on a document recovered at a former residence of Osama Bin Laden in Kandahar, Afghanistan.

b. The detainee participated in military operations against the United States or its coalition partners.

1. The detainee was a member of al Irata and a mujahadin fighter at Kandahar.

=== Transcript ===
Al Harbi chose to participate in his Combatant Status Review Tribunal.

== Mentioned in the "No-hearing hearings" study ==
According to the study entitled, No-hearing hearings, Al Harbi was an example of a captive who was arbitrarily denied the opportunity to present exculpatory documents to his Tribunal. The study quoted Al Harbi:

It is important you find the notes on my visa and passport because they show I was there for 8 days and could not have been expected to go to Afghanistan and engage in hostilities against anyone.

== Repatriation ==
On November 25, 2008, the Department of Defense released a list of the dates captives departed from Guantanamo. According to that list he was repatriated to Saudi custody on November 9, 2007, with thirteen other men. The records published from the captives' annual Administrative Reviews show his repatriation was the subject of formal internal review procedures in 2005, 2006 and 2007. But the Board's recommendations from the 2007 review—the only one to be published—were redacted. The conclusion the Designated Civilian Official authorized was also redacted.

At least ten other men in his release group were not repatriated through the formal review procedure.

Peter Taylor writing for the BBC News called the Saudis repatriated on November 9, 2007, with al-Harbi, "batch 10". He wrote that the BBC's research had found this batch to be a problematic cohort, and that four other men from this batch were named on the Saudi most wanted list.

== Defection ==
In January 2009, Al-Qaeda in the Arabian Peninsula released several threatening videos.

Two of the Al-Qaida spokesmen appearing in the video identified themselves as former Guantanamo captives, and graduates of the Care rehabilitation center, a Saudi facility intended to deprogram former jihadists. One of the men claiming to be a former Guantanamo captive, identified himself as Abu Hareth Muhammad al-Oufi claimed to have been Guantanamo captive 333.

He appeared in the video with three other men, one of whom was also identified as a former Guantanamo captive, Guantanamo captive 372, Abu Sufyan al-Azdi al-Shahri. The other two men were identified as Abu Baseer al-Wahayshi and Abu Hureira Qasm al-Rimi.

The independent third party terrorist consultants at SITE Institute confirmed that he was Guantanamo captive 333. Guantanamo spokesman Commander Jeffrey Gordon declined to confirm SITE's identifications.

On January 28, 2009, the Saudi Gazette published a report based largely on interviews with al-Oufi's family. Al-Oufi's mother told the Saudi Gazette that her son's radicalization was due to al-Shihri's influence. His sister said he gave no clues to his defection and disappearance until he received a cell phone call from Al-Shihri, who subsequently picked him up, and then the pair disappeared. She said their father had been bed-ridden since his re-emergence on the al Qaida video.

The article also quoted former Guantanamo captive Abdulaziz Abdulrahman Al-Badah:

They are selfish. They just forgot all about the damage they have inflicted on the rest of our brothers who have been suffering for years in Guantanamo.

On February 3, 2009, the Saudi government published a most wanted list that named 85 suspected terrorists. Robert Worth, reporting in The New York Times, wrote that fourteen Saudis, formerly held in Guantanamo, had fallen under suspicion of supporting terrorism following their release. He identified "Abu Hareth Muhammad al-Awfi", an alias of al Harbis as on the list, with two of the three other men who appeared in the threatening video, and a third man.

== Surrender ==
Reuters, Agence France Presse and The New York Times reported on February 17, 2009, that Saudi Authorities reported "Mohamed Atiq Awayd al-Awfi" voluntarily turned himself in to Saudi authorities in Yemen. The Saudi Gazette reports he turned himself in to Yemeni authorities at the Saudi/Yemen border.

CNN reported that he was captured by Yemeni security officials who extradited him to Saudi Arabia. Another difference between CNN's reporting and that from other news services is that CNN called Al Shihri "one of al Qaeda's top leaders in Yemen", and called al-Awfi "the group's field commander." According to other news services. al-Shihri had been identified as second in command of Al-Qaida in the Arabian Peninsula, and no one had stated al-Awfi's position in the organization.

Al Awfi is reported to have contacted the leaders of the rehabilitation program prior to his surrender. He is reported to be scheduled to return to the rehabilitation program.

According to the Middle East Online Saudi security officials assert Al Harbi has informed them that Iran is sponsoring al Qaeda.

== Listed as a former captive who "re-engaged in terrorism" ==
On May 27, 2009, the Defense Intelligence Agency published a "fact sheet" listing captives who "re-engaged in terrorism". The fact sheet listed al Awfi and Al Shihri.

== BBC Interview ==
Peter Taylor interviewed Al Harbi, who he called "Mohammed al-Awfi", for the BBC News. Mohammed al-Awfi told him that his interrogations in Bagram involved brutal abuse to his genitals. He attributed his escape to join the jihadists because the abuse he suffered at the hands of the Americans was more powerful than the arguments offered in the Care rehabilitation program. He said that once he was in Yemen, with the jihadists:

I saw the truth. I saw that the path was a deviant path away from the sayings of the Prophet. Thanks to God Almighty's generosity, I realised that and I made a final decision to return to Saudi Arabia.

Taylor reported being skeptical of Mohammed al-Awfi's account of his escape to Yemen and his subsequent defection.
