= Said Ali al-Shihri =

Saudi Arabian terrorist (1971–2013)

Sa'id Ali Jabir Al Khathim Al Shihri
- Said Ali Al Shiri in 2009.
- Born: 1971; Riyadh, Saudi Arabia
- Died: 2013 (aged 41–42); Yemen
- Other name: Said Ali al-Shihri Abu Sufyan Al-Azadi
- Known for: Former Deputy Emir of AQAP
- Military career
- Allegiance: al-Qaeda (1990's–2013)
- Branch: AQAP (2009–2013)
- Service years: 1990's–2013
- Rank: Deputy Emir of AQAP
- Conflicts: Yemen Insurgency

Sa'id Ali Jabir Al Khathim Al Shihri (Arabic: سعيد علي جابر الخثيم الشهري) was a Saudi Arabian deputy leader of the designated terrorist group Al-Qaeda in the Arabian Peninsula (AQAP), and possibly involved in the kidnappings and murders of foreigners in Yemen. Sa'id Ali al-Shihri was captured at the Durand Line, in December 2001, and was one of the first detainees held at the Guantanamo Bay detention camps, in Cuba, arriving on 21 January 2002. He was held in extrajudicial detention in American custody for almost six years. Following his repatriation to Saudi custody, he was enrolled in a rehabilitation and reintegration program. Following his release, he traveled to Yemen.

In January 2009, al-Shihri appeared in a YouTube video with three other men, announcing the founding of Al-Qaeda in the Arabian Peninsula.

On 24 December 2009, it was reported that he may have been killed in an air strike in Yemen, but on 19 January 2010, Yemen security authorities reported they had captured him. On 22 February 2010, the Yemen Post reported that the release of an audio recording, after the reports of his death, or capture, confirmed he was at large.

Yemen officials reported he was killed by a drone strike on 10 September 2012. Six days later, a Yemeni official told the London-based daily Asharq Al-Awsat that DNA tests reportedly determined he was not killed in the drone strike. On 20 September 2012, sources close to AQAP told the Yemen Observer that al-Shihri was not killed in the strike. Yemeni officials also told the same newspaper that, contrary to what Asharq Al-Aswat reported, no DNA tests had yet been taken and that the United States had requested that the Yemeni government wait until an American team of examiners could administer the DNA tests on the corpses of the men killed in the drone strike.

On 21 October 2012, al-Shihri released an audio tape confirming that he was not killed in the drone strike. On 22 January 2013, it was reported that al-Shihri had died of wounds from a drone strike in late 2012.

On 17 July 2013, Al-Qaeda in the Arabian Peninsula confirmed that he had been killed in a US drone strike instead of succumbing to wounds. In August 2014, the group revealed in a video that the drone strike that killed al-Shihri took place in 2013 and that he had survived the 2012 drone strike but was severely wounded.

== Early life ==
The Yemen Post reports al-Shihri did not finish high school. According to the United States Department of Defense, al-Shihri spent two months in Afghanistan in approximately 2000, and trained at the Libyan jihadist training camp north of Kabul. Al-Shihri said that he was in Afghanistan to purchase carpets for his family's furniture business and denied any knowledge of weapons or participation in hostilities.

In 2001, al-Shihri left Saudi Arabia and went to Bahrain. He was on a watch list because he was suspected of funding other fighters' travels to Afghanistan after the September 11 attacks. He was also accused of helping Saudis acquire false travel documents to enter into Afghanistan. Specifically, he was accused of meeting with "a group of extremists in Mashad, Iran", and briefing them on entry procedures into Afghanistan via the Al-Tayyibat crossing.

=== Capture ===
Al-Shihri was captured at the Pakistan border crossing in December 2001 near Spin Boldak. He was traveling with an Afghan driver, another Saudi man who worked with the Red Crescent charity organization, and a member from the Saudi embassy in Pakistan, in a vehicle taking supplies to a camp in Afghanistan. He was found with an injured leg incurred during the American aerial bombardment of Afghanistan.

Al-Shihri was also allegedly carrying $1,900 at the time. He claimed he wanted to give the money to the Red Crescent, but according to the US, he used the money to finance the travel for other fighters traveling from Bahrain to Afghanistan.

== Combatant Status Review ==
Initially, the Bush administration asserted they could withhold the protections of the Geneva Conventions from captives in the war on terror, while critics argued the Conventions obliged the United States to conduct competent tribunals to determine the status of prisoners. Subsequently, the Department of Defense instituted Combatant Status Review Tribunals (CSRT), to determine whether the captives met the new definition of an "enemy combatant".

Detainees do not have the right to a lawyer before the CSRTs or to access the evidence against them. The CSRTs are not bound by the rules of evidence that would apply in court, and the government’s evidence is presumed to be “genuine and accurate.” However, unclassified summaries of relevant evidence may be provided to the detainee, and each detainee has an opportunity to present “reasonably available” evidence and witnesses.

From July 2004 through March 2005, a CSRT was convened to make a determination whether each captive had been correctly classified as an "enemy combatant". Sa'id Ali al-Shihri was among the one-third of prisoners for whom there was no indication they chose to participate in their tribunals.

In the landmark case Boumediene v. Bush, the US Supreme Court found that CSRTs are not an adequate substitute for the constitutional right to challenge one's detention in court, in part because they do not have the power to order detainees released. The Court also found that "there is considerable risk of error in the tribunal’s findings of fact."

A Summary of Evidence memo was prepared for the tribunal, listing the alleged facts that led to al-Shahri's detainment. His memo accused him of the following:

- he traveled from Saudi Arabia to Afghanistan, after 11 September 2001, with $1,900, that he planned to give to the Red Crescent charity;
- he was an "Al-Qaeda travel facilitator", who funded other fighters and guided them on how to cross the Afghanistan–Iran border;
- he was on a watch list because he was suspected of helping Saudis acquire false travel documents for traveling to Afghanistan;
- he trained at the Libyan camp north of Kabul;
- he was instructed to assassinate someone, via a fatwa;
- his leg was wounded during the American aerial bombardment of Afghanistan.

=== Administrative Review Board ===
Detainees whose Combatant Status Review Tribunal labeled them "enemy combatants" were scheduled for annual Administrative Review Board hearings. These hearings were designed to assess the threat a detainee might pose if released or transferred, and whether there were other factors that warranted his continued detention.

==== 2005 Summary of evidence memo ====
The three-page Summary of Evidence memo prepared for al-Shahri's 2005 annual review listed fifteen "primary factors favor[ing] continued detention" and eight "primary factors favor[ing] release or transfer." According to the 2005 memo, he did not enter Afghanistan across its western border with Iran but across its eastern border with Pakistan. The memo identified the instructions he received to assassinate someone as coming from Sheikh Hamud Al-Uqqla. The memo also stated that he met Abu Faisal al Ghamdi, the Herat regional director for the charity al Wafa – which American intelligence officials assert had ties to terrorism – and another al Wafa director had his phone number in his pocket litter.

The 2005 memo repeated al-Shihri's account of his travel and wounding in Afghanistan—that he traveled there for humanitarian purposes and was wounded within 17 hours of his arrival. He claimed he had never heard of either al Wafa or Al-Qaeda prior to his arrival in Guantanamo. He denied any knowledge of weapons or participation in hostilities, or any participation in assisting militant recruits to travel to Afghanistan. He stated that Osama bin Laden "did not represent Islam".

==== 2006 Summary of Evidence memo ====
The four page Summary of Evidence memo prepared for his 2006 annual review listed twenty-two "primary factors favor[ing] continued detention" and nine "primary factors favor[ing] release or transfer". According to the 2006 memo, he decided to do charity work in Pakistan after he heard a speech by Shaykh Abdullah al-Jibrin at the Al-Rajeh mosque in Saudi Arabia and saw videos of Afghan refugees. According to the 2006 memo, he had previously traveled to the Pakistan border with Afghanistan to observe the work in a refugee camp near Chaman, Pakistan. The 2006 memo was more specific about his assistance to potential fighters, stating: "The detainee met with a group of extremists in Mashad, Iran following the 11 September 2001 attacks and briefed them on entry procedures into Afghanistan via the Al-Tayyibat crossing."

The 2006 memo was also more specific about where he crossed—near Spin Buldak: "The detainee traveled with an Afghan driver, another Saudi man who worked with the Red Crescent, and a member from the Saudi embassy in Pakistan, in a vehicle taking supplies to a camp in Afghanistan." The camp was about 5 kilometers from the border between Spin Buldak Afghanistan and Quetta, Pakistan. The 2006 memo stated one of his aliases: "was among 100 names taken from Afghanistan-based military training cmap applications located at an Arab office in Kandahar". The 2006 memo quoted the individual who claimed al-Shihri had "instigated" him to assassinate a writer, based on Al-Uqqla's fatwa. According to this version, al-Shihri was not wounded; he had successfully fled Afghanistan, through Iran, to Kuwait. The 2006 memo also stated that he was taken to a hospital run by the Red Crescent society in Pakistan, and that he was arrested in the hospital.

==== 2007 Summary of evidence memo ====
The three-page Summary of Evidence memo prepared for his 2007 annual review listed just eleven "primary factors favor[ing] continued detention" and six "primary factors favor[ing] release or transfer"; no new allegations were added. On 9 January 2009, the Department of Defense published two heavily redacted memos, from al-Shihri's Board to Gordon R. England, the Designated Civilian Official. The Board's recommendation was unanimous, but it was also redacted. England's decision, made on 23 July 2007, was also redacted.

== Guantanamo medical records ==
On 16 March 2007, the Department of Defense published records of the captives' height and weights from the Guantanamo Bay detention camp. Al-Shihri's height was reported as 62 inches tall. His weight was recorded 46 times between his arrival on 21 January 2002, when he weighed 138 pounds, and 19 November 2006, when he weighed 171 pounds.

== Repatriation ==
On 25 November 2008, the Department of Defense released a list of the dates captives departed from Guantanamo. According to that list, al-Shahri was repatriated to Saudi custody on 9 November 2007, with thirteen other men. The records published from the captives' annual Administrative Reviews show his repatriation was the subject of formal internal review procedures in 2005, 2006, and 2007. However, the Board's recommendations from the 2007 review—the only one to be published—were redacted. The conclusion authorized by the Designated Civilian Official was also redacted.

At least ten other men in al-Shahri's release group were not repatriated through the formal review procedure.

Peter Taylor writing for the BBC News called the Saudis repatriated on 9 November 2007 with al-Shihri, "batch 10". He wrote that the BBC's research had found this batch to be a problematic cohort, and that al-Shihri and four other men from this batch were named on the Saudi most wanted list.

=== Post-release ===
After al-Shihri's repatriation to Saudi custody, he went through a Saudi rehabilitation and reintegration program for former jihadists. This program was partially sponsored by the United States.

== Reported activities in 2009 ==
In January 2009, after al-Shahri's release from the Saudi rehabilitation program, he appeared in several jihadist videos, including one where he was identified as the second in command of Al-Qaeda in the Arabian Peninsula. He appeared in a threatening YouTube video with three other men, identified as Abu Hareth Muhammad al-Oufi, Abu Baseer al-Wahayshi, and Abu Hureira Qasm al-Rimi.

The New York Times, quoting American diplomats in Sanaa, reported that a car bomb that detonated outside their Embassy in Sanaa was the work of al-Shihri.

On 26 January 2009, the Saudi Gazette published a report based on interviews with al-Shihri's father and current wife. Jaber Aal Khath'am al-Shihri said his son had spent Ramadan with his family. The elder al-Shihri said his son was a primary-school dropout, that he had been married twice, and had a young daughter. He said that his son had been troubled by memories of his detention, where his son told him "he thought about death all the time." He said that, after his release, his son had hoped to find a job as an imam. He said that he had added an addition to his family home for his son and his family to live in; however, after Ramadan, his son left his pregnant wife and child with his in-laws, and disappeared.

The Saudi Gazette reported that his wife confirmed his father's account, and she told the Gazette that al-Shahri had been acting normally prior to his disappearance: "He used to smile and laugh and was generally happy." She described the 3000 Saudi riyal monthly stipend he received from the Saudi government, following his release, as "an honor." She also told the paper that her husband's sister had phoned her after his disappearance and told her that he had requested she get a cell phone so he could talk to her, but then he had not phoned.

The Saudi Gazette reported that one of al-Shihri's brothers-in-law, Yusuf al-Shihri, was also a former Guantanamo captive.

While al-Shihri's wife had told the Saudi Gazette she suspected nothing, his father said visits from other former captives disturbed him, and he attributed his son's defection to their influence. He said that he regretted his son had not died from the wounds he suffered in Afghanistan.

I say it loud and clear that my son is a deviant member of society who must be removed. He was not upright like the rest of the Gitmo returnees who benefited from the lessons of the past and showed their gratefulness for the assistance they were provided.

Muhammad al-Oufi's mother told the Saudi Gazette that her son's radicalization was due to Sa'id Ali al-Shahri's influence.

On 27 May 2009, the Defense Intelligence Agency published a "fact sheet" listing captives who "re-engaged in terrorism", which listed al Awfi and al-Shihri.

=== Message to Somali pirates ===
On 16 April 2009, CBS News reported on a message al-Shihri issued to Somali pirates:

To our steadfast brethren in Somalia, take caution and prepare yourselves. Increase your strikes against the crusaders at sea and in Djibouti.

CBS reported that there had been little concrete sign of a collaboration between Al-Qaeda and the Somali pirates, but that the message also promised Osama bin Laden, Ayman Al Zawahiri, and Mullah Omar that al-Shihri's group would be opening a new front in the Arabian Peninsula.

=== Murder of Christian missionaries in Yemen ===
In June 2009, Fox News quoting Robert Spencer of Jihad Watch, linked Sa'id Ali al-Shihri to the kidnapping and murder of Christian missionaries Rita Stumpp, Anita Gruenwald, Eom Young-sun, and the kidnapping of six other Christian medical missionaries:

"If he believed that these people picnicking in Yemen were aiding in the war against Islam, then he can justify these killings as legitimate – it's this kind of perspective that this guy holds to, that it's right to kill people who would normally be considered off-limits."

Fox News also quoted Gregory Johnsen, editor of "Islam and Insurgency in Yemen":

"The most likely scenario is that Al Qaeda's responsible. And if it does turn out that Al Qaeda is responsible, then it would be that al-Shihri had a hand in the operation whether behind the scenes or up front."

While Fox News acknowledged that no group had taken responsibility for the murders, it speculated that the possible involvement of al-Shihri, a graduate of the Saudi jihadist rehabilitation program, would complicate United States President Barack Obama's plans to close Guantanamo Bay detention camp.

=== Named in a custody dispute ===
In August 2009, the first husband of al-Shihri's wife Umm Hajir Al-Azdi, a man named Saoud Aal Shaye' al-Qahtani, launched a child custody claim, noting that his former wife was a believer in the practice of takfir (declaring others apostates from Islam) and had taken their 11-year-old son to Yemen with al-Shihri in May 2009. Al-Qahtani provided evidence of her inability to raise his son, noting that she was married to al-Shihri, her younger brother had been imprisoned at Guantanamo, three of her brothers were allegedly "militant jihadists", and her second husband had been killed by Saudi security forces in 2004.

=== Donation request ===
On 30 September 2009, the Middle East Media Resources Institute reported that al-Shihri had released a video requesting donations. Sa'id's father and Prince Muhammad Bin Naif, Assistant Deputy Interior Minister for Security Affairs, spoke out against his funding efforts.

== Rumors of death ==
On 24 December 2009, ABC News reported that an air strike in Yemen had killed senior members of Al-Qaeda. They reported that the dead might include al-Shihri, Nasir al-Wuhayshi, and Anwar al-Awlaki.

=== Reported capture ===
On 19 January 2010, Yemen security authorities reported that they had captured al-Shihri. He was reported to have tried to evade a newly established roadblock and to have been apprehended, with another man, after they were injured when their speeding vehicle flipped over.

==== Release of an audio recording in February 2010 ====
The Yemen Post reported that al-Shihri released an audio recording made after the reports of his death and capture; they also speculated that the release of an audio tape by al-Shahri meant the announcement by the Yemeni Ministry of Defense on the death of Nasser al-Wahayshi in the 24 December 2009 attack was correct. Al-Shihri's audio took credit for the attempted airliner bombing by Nigerian Umar Farouk Abdulmutalib, and he threatened that the group had scheduled an operation to "control Bab Al-Mandab strait". The Yemen Post also reported al-Shihri's claim that the United States was planning to insert US troops into Yemen to directly attack his group.

=== Arrest of 100 suspected followers ===
On 25 March 2010, Saudi officials announced that they had arrested 100 suspected followers of Al-Qaeda in the Arabian Peninsula. Judith Miller, reporting for Fox News, wrote that the captured men were reported to be "exchanging coded e-mails" with an account under the name "Abu Hajer" which was "believed to be a nom de guerre for Said Al Shihri."

=== Reports of death ===
On 22 January 2013, members of al-Shihri's family told Al Arabiya that he had died earlier that day after succumbing to wounds from a previous airstrike. An Al-Qaeda spokesman identified as Abdulla bin Muhammad stated on his Twitter account that al-Shihri died "after a long journey in fighting the Zio-Crusader campaign." It was not known exactly how he died and under what circumstances, though his family alleged the drone strike took place sometime in the second week of December 2012. On 9 April, the media arm of Al-Qaeda in the Arabian Peninsula, Al-Malahem Foundation, released an audio message of al-Shihri, accompanied by a previously unreleased photo; an Al-Qaeda cleric identified as Abu-Saad Al-Aamly denied reports of al-Shihri's death.

== Death ==
On 17 July 2013, Al-Qaeda in the Arabian Peninsula confirmed that al-Shihri was killed in a US drone strike. The announcement, posted on militant websites, gave no date for the death. In August 2014, the group revealed that al-Shihri was killed in 2013 and had survived the 2012 drone strike, but lost his right eye, right ear, and a part of his skull.
