= Jabir Jubran Al Fayfi =

Al-Qaeda terrorist (born 1975)

- Born: 1975 (age 50–51); Ta'if, Saudi Arabia
- Arrested: late 2001; Afghanistan or Pakistan
- Released: December 13, 2006; Saudi Arabia
- Citizenship: Yemen
- Detained at: Guantánamo
- ISN: 188
- Alleged to be a member of: Taliban, Al-Qaeda
- Charge(s): No charge (held in extrajudicial detention)
- Status: Repatriated to Saudi Arabia (December 13, 2006); Rejoined Al-Qaeda in the Arabian Peninsula; Surrendered to Saudi Arabia (September 9, 2010)
- Occupation: taxi driver

Jabir Jubran Al Fayfi (also Jabir Jubran Al Fayfi and Jaber Jabran Ali Al-Fayfee and Jaber Al-Fifi; born in 1975 in Ta'if, Saudi Arabia) is a citizen of Saudi Arabia who was held in extrajudicial detention in the United States Guantánamo Bay detention camp, in Cuba on allegations he trained and fought with al-Qaeda and the Taliban in Afghanistan in 2001.

Al Fayfi was repatriated to Saudi custody in December 2006, and completed a rehabilitation program. He then however joined al-Qaeda in Yemen and was in Yemen for two years, where he rose to become one of the top dozen leaders of al-Qaeda in the Arabian Peninsula. In September 2010, he surrendered to Saudi Arabia, and on November 1, 2010, he was reported to have provided information that helped thwart the 2010 cargo plane bomb plot.

== Career ==
Al-Faifi grew up in Taif and earned a certificate after completing 18 months in the Technical and Vocational Training Corporation. At the age of 22 he worked as a security guard at Taif Prison and then transferred to a prison in Jeddah. Al-Faifi said of his move, "I moved to Jeddah because I wanted to join the Al-Ahli club. I used to play football for the prison team in Taif. My friend recommended I move to work in Jeddah so I could be closer to the club which I could join and continue working. However, when I moved to Jeddah, I found out that the period to register new players was over." He was fired from his job at the prison after receiving many warnings for being late. He returned to Taif and was unable to find employment and remained unemployed for four years.

It was during this time that al-Faifi's involvement with militants began. He began to go out with "friends every day to escape from the daily pressure of finding a job." At first he led a self-described "wild-life," but then became more religiously conservative to the extent that he would prevent his siblings from watching television. He listened to taped lectures on the subject of Jihad and then he said he "felt like joining a jihad group." He spent the next nine months with a group of friends who showed him videotapes of militant activities in Chechnya. One of his friends arranged for al-Faiafi to travel to Afghanistan by way of Qatar and then Pakistan while his family thought him to have gone to the Eastern Province for employment.

Al-Faifi said he had not heard of al-Qaeda at that point and only wanted to train in firearms and then join the Taliban or go to Chechnya. He had been in Afghanistan for nine months when the September 11 attacks occurred. He said he initially thought the attacks were the work of China and then "heard" that a jihadi group was responsible. After September 11, he described al-Qaeda as "emerging," at which point he moved to northern Afghanistan to fight against the Northern Alliance and American forces. He remained there for a month until the bombing of Kabul by Allied forces and then retreated first to Tora Bora and then to Jalalabad.

After the month of Ramadan in 2001, al-Faifi and approximately 300 other exhausted and scared fighters, mostly Saudis, walked for four days to the Pakistani border where they surrendered to local tribes hoping to be returned to their home governments. Instead, the militants were "sold" to the Americans before being transferred to Guantánamo.

== Activities in Afghanistan ==
The U.S. military asserted that Al Fayfi was present in Afghanistan following the al-Qaeda attacks on September 11, 2001. It asserted Al Fayfi had acknowledged being an armed participant in the Taliban's conflict with the Afghan Northern Alliance in the fall of 2001, but that he denied ever firing his weapon. It also indicated that Al Fayfi had denied ever meeting any al-Qaeda member in Afghanistan, and that he denied attending any Afghan training camps. Al Fayfi said that he decided to go to Afghanistan as a form of repentance, because he had not been a sufficiently observant Muslim, having used drugs, smoked, and not prayed often enough. Al Fayfi's Guantanamo Internment Serial Number was 188. American intelligence analysts estimate he was born in 1975, in Ta'if, Saudi Arabia.

== Combatant Status Review ==
Initially the Bush administration asserted they could withhold the protections of the Geneva Conventions from captives in the war on terror, while critics argued the Conventions obliged the United States to conduct competent tribunals to determine the status of prisoners. Subsequently the Department of Defense instituted Combatant Status Review Tribunals, to determine whether the captives met the new definition of an "enemy combatant".

Detainees do not have the right to a lawyer before the CSRTs or to access the evidence against them. The CSRTs are not bound by the rules of evidence that would apply in court, and the government’s evidence is presumed to be “genuine and accurate.” However, unclassified summaries of relevant evidence may be provided to the detainee and each detainee has an opportunity to present “reasonably available” evidence and witnesses.

From July 2004 through March 2005, a CSRT was convened to make a determination whether each captive had been correctly classified as an "enemy combatant". Jabir Jubran Al Fayfi was among the one-third of prisoners for whom there was no indication they chose to participate in their tribunals.

In the landmark case Boumediene v. Bush, the U.S. Supreme Court found that CSRTs are not an adequate substitute for the constitutional right to challenge one's detention in court, in part because they do not have the power to order detainees released. The Court also found that "there is considerable risk of error in the tribunal’s findings of fact."

A Summary of Evidence memo was prepared for the tribunal, listing the alleged facts that led to his detainment. His memo accused him of the following:

a. The detainee is associated with al-Qaida and the Taliban.

1. The detainee was recruited at a mosque in Saudi Arabia to participate in Jihad.
2. Detainee received two weeks of weapons training on the Kalashnikov rifle.
3. In November and December 2001, detainee met with al Qaida members while in Tora Bora, Afghanistan.
4. One of the detainee's known aliases was on a list of captured al Qaida members that was discovered on a computer hard drive associated with a senior al-Qaida member.

b. The detainee participated in military operations against the coalition.

1. Detainee was issued a Kalashnikov rifle in Bagram, Afghanistan, to fight on the lines.
2. Detainee fought the Northern Alliance from September through December 2001.
3. Detainee was instructed to flee Afghanistan and go to Pakistan via the mountains.

=== Administrative Review Board ===
Detainees whose Combatant Status Review Tribunal labeled them "enemy combatants" were scheduled for annual Administrative Review Board hearings. These hearings were designed to assess the threat a detainee might pose if released or transferred, and whether there were other factors that warranted his continued detention.

=== First annual Administrative Review Board ===
A Summary of Evidence memo was prepared for Jabri Jabran Al Fayfi's first annual Administrative Review Board, on December 3, 2004. The memo listed factors for and against his continued detention.

The following primary factors favor continued detention:

a. Commitment

1. One of detainee's known aliases was on a list of captured al-Qaeda members that was discovered on a computer hard drive associated with a senior al-Qaeda member.
2. Detainee fought the Northern Alliance from September through December 2001.

b. Training

1. Detainee received two weeks of weapons training on the Kalishnikov rifle.
2. Detainee trained at the Al Farouq training camp near Kandahar.

c. Connection/Associations

1. The detainee stayed at the Arab Center in Bagram, Afghanistan, where Taliban fighters stayed while waiting to go to the line to fight.
2. The detainee spent time in a Jaesh e Mohammed [sic] (JEM) building in Karachi, Pakistan
3. JEM is an Islamic extremist group based in Pakistan. The JEM had close ties to Afghan Arabs and the Taliban. Usama Bin Ladin is suspected of giving funding to the JEM.
4. In November and December 2001, detainee met with al Qaida members while in Tora Bora, Afghanistan.
5. Detainee was instructed to flee Afghanistan and go to Pakistan via the mountains.

d. Intent

1. Detainee was recruited at a mosque in Saudi Arabia to participate in Jihad.
2. Detainee was issued a Kalishnikov [sic] rifle in Bagram, Afghanistan to fight on the lines.

The following primary factors favor release or transfer:

a. The detainee stated he was never trained at a terrorist training camp.

b. The detainee stated he now thinks what he did was a mistake (Apr 2003).

c. The detainee stated that he learned a lesson from his experience in Afghanistan and at Camp Delta and would not participate in another jihad.

=== Second annual Administrative Review Board ===
A Summary of Evidence memo was prepared for Jabri Jabran Al Fayfi's second annual Administrative Review Board, on February 18, 2006. The memo listed factors for and against his continued detention.

=== Board recommendations ===
In early September 2007, the Department of Defense released two heavily redacted memos, from his Board, to Gordon R. England, the Designated Civilian Official.

The Board's recommendation was unanimous. The Board's recommendation memos were heavily redacted—their actual recommendation was redacted. The Board based its recommendation on assessments from the FBI, the CIA, the United States Department of State and the Deputy Assistant Secretary of Defense for Detainee Affairs.

The Board's recommendation memo indicated that it convened twice, on March 3, 2006, and April 28, 2006. The Board concluded that Jabri Jabran Al Fayfi continued to pose a threat to the United States.

In the memo where they explained the basis for their recommendation, the Board reported:

(U) The ARB has complied with the Detainee Treatment Act of 2005. In making a determination of status or disposition of this detainee, the ARB has assessed, to the extent practicable, whether any statement derived from or relating to this detainee was obtained as a result of coercion; and the probative value, if any, of any such statement. In addition, the ARB considered any new evidence that became available relating

to the enemy combatant status of this detainee.

== Repatriation ==
According to the Department of Defense, Al Fayfi was released from Guantánamo and turned over to the Saudi Arabian government on December 13, 2006, after he promised never to participate in another jihad and said he wanted to return home to Saudi Arabia to take care of his parents and resume his job as a taxi driver. He was released with 15 other Saudis: Muhammed Yahia Mosin Al Zayla, Salim Suliman Al Harbi, Yusef Abdullah Saleh Al Rabiesh, Salman Saad Al Khadi Mohammed, Ibrahimj Sulayman Muhammad Arbaysh, Abdullah Muhammed Abdel Aziz, Anwar Hamdan Muhammed Al-Noor, Salah Abdul Rasul Ali Abdul Al-Balushi, Abd Al Aziz Muhammad Ibrahim Al Nasir, Ziad Said Farg Jahdari, Majed Hamad Al Frih, Bessam Muhammed Saleh Al Dubaikey, Said Ali Abdullah Al Farha Al Ghamidi, Sultan Sari Sayel Al Anazi and Abdul Rahman Khowlan.

According to the Saudi government, Al Fayfi was repatriated on December 14, 2006, along with six other Saudis. The seven men were detained, without charge, in Hayer Prison, while Saudi justice officials determined whether they had violated any Saudi laws.

=== Rehabilitation program ===
He went through and completed Saudi Arabia's militant rehabilitation program, at the Muhammad Bin Naif Al-Munasaha Center. He was considered "low risk", and one of a series of test cases to assess whether the program worked. The program seeks to convince its participants through Islamic teachings that al-Qaeda's ideology is wrong. It also offers participants money and supervision through their family that seeks to prevent them from resuming militant activities.

== Al-Qaeda ==
Fayfi joined al-Qaeda in Yemen at some point after his participation in the Saudi rehabilitation program. He was in Yemen for two years, and rose to become one of the top dozen leaders of al-Qaeda in the Arabian Peninsula. On February 3, 2009, the Saudi government published a list of 85 "most wanted" suspected terrorists, that included Al Fayfi.

== Surrender ==
On September 7, 2010, Fox News reported that Al Fayfi had recently been arrested in a sweep of suspected militants.

A Yemeni official said that security authorities in Abyan province in Yemen had accepted his surrender and taken him into custody on September 9. Yemeni authorities arranged for his return, and transferred him to Riyadh.

The Saudi Interior Ministry announced on October 15, 2010, that Al Fayfi had contacted Saudi authorities from Yemen within then-recent weeks during Ramadan to express his regret and readiness to surrender. Interior Ministry spokesman General Mansour al-Turki said that Al Fayfi's case will be administered "according to local laws", but that he will be given consideration for turning himself in.

=== Reportedly helped thwart bomb plot ===
On November 1, 2010, Al Fayfi was reported to have provided information that helped thwart the 2010 cargo plane bomb plot. The Associated Press, quoting Yemeni security officials who requested anonymity, who believed that Al Fayfi was a mole Saudi security officials tasked to penetrate Al-Qaeda in the Arabian Peninsula. According to the Associated Press:

Al-Fayfi's surrender may have revealed other plots as well. In mid-October, a couple of weeks after his surrender, Saudi Arabia warned European authorities of a threat from al-Qaeda in the Arabian Peninsula, saying the group's operatives were active on the continent, particularly France.
