= Othman Ahmad Othman al-Ghamdi =

Extrajudicial prisoner of the United States (1979–2015)

Othman Ahmed Othman Al Omairah
- Othman Ahmad Othman al-Ghamdi, from a video released by Al Qaeda in the Arabian Peninsula.
- Born: May 27, 1979; Taif, Saudi Arabia
- Died: February 2015 (aged 35); Yemen
- Detained at: Guantanamo
- Other name: Othman Ahmad Othman al-Ghamdi
- ISN: 184
- Charge(s): no charge, held in extrajudicial detention
- Status: transferred to Saudi Arabian custody on June 25, 2006

Othman Ahmed Othman Al Omairah (also transliterated as Othman Ahmad Othman al-Ghamdi, May 27, 1979 – February 2015) was a citizen of Saudi Arabia who was held in extrajudicial detention in the United States Guantanamo Bay detainment camps, Cuba.

His Guantanamo Internment Serial Number was 184.

== Inconsistent identification ==
Othman was identified differently on official US documents and official Saudi documents.

He was identified as Othman Ahmed Othman Al Omairah on official lists of captives from April 2006, May 2006 and September 2007, and on the memos that summarized the allegations against him.

On June 25, 2006, the US repatriated 14 men to Saudi Arabia, including a man the Saudi government identified as Othman Ahmad Othman al-Ghamdi.

U.S. DoD reports indicate he was a citizen of Yemen.

== Combatant Status Review ==
A Summary of Evidence memo was prepared for his tribunal. The memo listed the following allegations against him:

The detainee is associated with al Qaida:

1. The detainee traveled to Afghanistan on a forged passport.
2. The detainee traveled in response to a fatwa for Muslims to fight.
3. The detainee provided a false name when captured.
4. The detainee received weapons training on the Kalashnikov, the PK machine gun, and the Makarov pistol at the al Farouq training camp, for one month from October–November 2001.

=== Administrative Review Board ===
Detainees whose Combatant Status Review Tribunal labeled them "enemy combatants" were scheduled for annual Administrative Review Board hearings. These hearings were designed to assess the threat a detainee might pose if released or transferred, and whether there were other factors that warranted his continued detention.

=== Summary of evidence memo ===
A Summary of Evidence memo was prepared for Othman Ahmed Othman Al Omairah Administrative Review Board on September 20, 2005. The memo listed factors for and against his continued detention. His memo was three pages long.

== Guantanamo record ==
There is no record that Othman Ahmad Othman al-Ghamdi chose to attend either his Combatant Status Review Tribunal or his Administrative Review Board hearing.

== Transfer to Saudi Arabia ==
On June 25, 2006, 14 men were transferred from Guantanamo to Saudi Arabia. A Saudi identified as Othman Ahmad Othman al-Ghamdi was identified as one of the released men.

== Named on a Saudi "most wanted" list ==
On February 3, 2009, the Saudi government published a list of 85 "most wanted" suspected terrorists, that included an individual identified as "Othman Al-Ghamdi". This list contained ten other former Guantanamo captives. Half of the eleven former captives listed on the most wanted list were also from among the eleven men repatriated on November 9, 2007—despite their annual reviews recommending continued detention.

The Saudi Gazette reported he "is believed to have traveled to a neighboring country" with his brother-in-law, fellow "most wanted" suspect and fellow former Guantanamo captive, Adnan Al-Sayegh, leaving behind his wife and son.

== Reported the death of Fahd Al Jutayli ==
The Yemen Post reported on September 27 that Othman al-Ghamdi and Yousuf Al-Shahri had contacted their families requesting that they pass on news to the family of Fahd Saleh Sulaiman Al-Jatili that he had died during a military action by Yemeni security officials.

== Reported to have appeared in a militant video ==
On May 28, 2010, Thomas Joscelyn, writing in The Long War Journal, reported that former Guantanamo captive "Othman Ahmed al Ghamdi" had recently appeared in a video entitled, "America and the Final Trap". Joscelyn reported that the tape was released by Al Qaeda in the Arabian Peninsula, and that Othman had confirmed that three of the group's leaders had been killed. Joscelyn reported that the tape described Othman as one of the group's commanders.

== Named on American wanted list ==
Al-Ghamdi was placed on the U.S. State Department's Rewards for Justice list on October 14, 2014.

== Death ==
Al-Ghamdi was killed in a drone strike in Yemen in February 2015. AQAP confirmed al-Ghamdi's death in September 2018.
