= Batch 10 =

Batch 10 is a name journalists have given to the tenth batch of former Saudi captives to be repatriated to Saudi Arabian custody. Five of the fourteen captives in this group repatriated to Saudi captivity on November 9, 2007 were among the eleven former Guantanamo captives to be listed on the 85 men on the Saudi list of most wanted suspected terrorists, published on February 3, 2009. One of the cohort, Said Ali al-Shihri, became second in command of Al Qaeda in the Arabian Peninsula.

According to Peter Taylor, reporting for the BBC, his team found that the cohort of Saudis repatriated in November 2007 problematic. He reported that many of these captives were not rehabilitated. He reported that five of the fourteen men in batch 10 escaped to Yemen, and joined jihadists there. The version of the men's names were Mohammed al-Awfi, Said al-Shihri, Yussef al-Shihri, Murtadha Ali Saeed Magram and Turki Meshawi Zayid al-Assiri. Said al-Shihri and Mohammed al-Awfi appeared in an alarming video in January 2009. Said al-Shihri took a leadership role in Al Qaida in the Arabian Peninsula. Yussef al-Shihri was killed in a shoot-out with Saudi security officials. He is alleged to have tried to cross the Saudi border dressed in a Burkha, an all-encompassing female garment, armed with a suicide belt. Taylor reports that Murtadha Ali Saeed Magram and Turki Meshawi Zayid al-Assiri remain at large. The other nine men repatriated in batch 10 were: Zaid Muhamamd Sa'id Al Husayn, Sultan Ahmed Dirdeer Musa Al Uwaydha, Khalid Saud Abd Al Rahman Al Bawardi, Faha Sultan, Fahd Umr Abd Al Majid Al Sharif, Nayif Abdallah Ibrahim Al Nukhaylan, Abdullah Abd Al Mu'in Al Wafti, Hani Saiid Mohammad Al Khalif and Jabir Hasan Muhamed Al Qahtani.
