= Rayed Abdullah Salem Al Harbi =

Member of Al Qaida in the Arabian Peninsula

- Born: 1988
- Died: 18 October 2009 (aged 20–21); Jizan, Saudi Arabia
- Occupation: member of Al Qaida in the Arabian Peninsula
- Known for: listed on the Saudi most wanted list in February 2009

Rayed Abdullah Salem Al Harbi (1988 – 18 October 2009) was a citizen of Saudi Arabia who was named on Saudi Arabia's list of most wanted terrorist suspects. He was discovered with Yussef al-Shiri at Jizan, near Saudi Arabia's border with Yemen, while disguised in women's clothing, and wearing suicide vests, on 18 October 2009.

== Criminal biography ==
The two men died in a shootout, as did a Saudi policeman, when a Saudi policewoman was going to search the two "women". A second policeman was injured. A third man, who has not been identified, and who was not in disguise, was driving with them, was captured. His interrogation led to the capture of six Yemeni accomplices. The men were reported to have been members in Al Qaida in the Arabian Peninsula. In addition to the suicide vests they were wearing their vehicle had a third completed suicide belt, and a fourth that had not yet been fully assembled.

Asharq Alawsat reports the men were driving a truck rented in Jeddah, 700 kilometres (430 mi) away. They report the men probably crossed the border at Al-Harth, 190 kilometres (120 mi) away. The individual who rented the truck remains at large.
