= Mish'al Muhammad Rashid Al-Shedocky =

- Born: 1982; Riyadh, Saudi Arabia
- Detained at: Guantanamo
- ISN: 71
- Charge(s): No charge, held in extrajudicial detention
- Status: Repatriated, May 2003. Named on the saudi most wanted list, in January 2009.

Mish'al Muhammad Rashid Al-Shedocky (born 1982) was a citizen of Saudi Arabia who was held in extrajudicial detention in the United States's Guantanamo Bay detention camps, in Cuba. His Guantanamo Internment Serial Number was 71.

According to official medical records published by the Department of Defense in March 2007, he arrived at Guantanamo on January 20, 2002. According to analysis of flight manifests of planes that landed in Portugal on their way to Guantanamo, his ID number was listed on a January 20, 2002, flight, and also listed on the flight manifest of a February 9, 2002. His name was listed three times on the January 20, 2002, flight manifest. On the February 9, 2002, flight manifest his ID was attached to Mehrabanb Fazrollah, a Tajikistani captive.

He was named on a list of Saudi Arabia's most wanted terrorist suspects. Al-Shedocky was one of the first Guantanamo captives to be repatriated. According to The Saudi Repatriates Report, Al-Shedocky was one of five men repatriated on May 15, 2003. The New York Times reported that his repatriation, and that of four other Saudis repatriated at the same time, was part of a secret deal. Saudi Arabia had been holding seven westerners, five of whom were United Kingdom citizens. The story reported that the five Saudis' repatriation was in return for the repatriation of the UK citizens.

The other four Saudi men released when he was were: Fahd Abdallah Ibrahim Al-Shabani, Fawaz Abd Al-Aziz Al-Zahrani, Ibrahim Rushdan Brayk Al-Shili and Ibrahim Umar Ali Al-Umar.

In 2009, following his placement on the Saudi most-wanted list, Evan Kohlmann, of the NEFA Foundation, reported that in 2004 Saudi Interior Minister Prince Nayef announced in 2004 that Meshal was to be tried in the Saudi justice system. Kohlmann, quoting cageprisoners.com reported that "he was held in Haer prison, near Riyadh, for a year before being transferred to a regional prison, so that he could be closer to his family."

In 2014, AQAP indicated in a three-part documentary about the group's former deputy leader Said Ali al-Shihri's life and death that al-Shedocky was dead by having the phrase "May Allah accept him" posted next to his name. The phrase is reserved for jihadists who have been killed in battle. The group did not provide any details on al-Shedocky's death.
