= Saudi arrests of suspected terrorists in March 2010 =

Security officials announced over one hundred individuals were apprehended in a series of Saudi arrests of suspected terrorists in March 2010. The individuals were all reported to be suspected of membership in Al Qaida in the Arabian Peninsula. Judith Miller, formerly of The New York Times, reporting for Fox News, wrote that the captured men were exchanging coded e-mails with Said Ali al-Shihri. Mansour Al Turki said "they all were asking for orders to start executing their plans from Al Qaeda in Yemen."

The Telegraph reported that the Saudis arrested 113 individuals. The suspects included 58 Saudis, 52 Yemenis, one Somali, one Bangla Deshi, and one Ethiopian. According to The Telegraph the arrests were spread over several months, and were only made public in March.

According to the Australian Broadcasting Corporation the captures represented three separate clandestine cells, which were unaware of one another. Two of the cells were said to be composed of six individuals each, while the third was said to hold 101 individuals. The raids were reported to have netted weapons, computers, anonymous prepaid cell phones, documents and cash. The round-up of the largest cell was reported to have begun with the shootout where al-Shiri's brother-in-law, former Guantanamo captive Yussef Mohammed Mubarak al Shihri was killed. According to Mansur al-Turki, a Saudi interior ministry spokesman, the cells were targeting Saudi's oil industry.

The Australian Broadcasting Corporation quoted a warning from Clive Williams, an expert in terrorism from Macquarie University, not to underestimate Al Qaida in the Arabian Peninsula.

""You've got a very competent ideology and you've got a very competent military guy. The overall commander of the group, Nasser al-Wahayshi, was actually detained by the Yemenis and escaped from jail in Yemen, so he was part of a large group that escaped in 2006. It's interesting that of the three leaders of AQAP, you've got two that have been detained in Yemen and escaped, and one who has come out of Guantanamo under the rehabilitation to a Saudi Arabia program. So all of those people are very experienced and well versed in Western methodology and so on."

Williams speculated that Saudi security officials had tortured the survivor of the October shootout.
