= Transatlantic aircraft plot =

Transatlantic aircraft plot may refer to:

- 2006 transatlantic aircraft plot
- 2010 transatlantic aircraft bomb plot
