= Turki Mash Awi Zayid Al Asiri =

Saudi Arabian Guantanamo detainee

- Born: March 8, 1975; Yaboq, Saudi Arabia
- Died: November 7, 2014 (aged 39); Tuban District, Yemen
- Detained at: Guantanamo
- Other name: Turki Mish'awi Za'id Alj-Amri
- ISN: 185
- Alleged to be a member of: Al-Qaeda, AQAP
- Charge: No charge (held in extrajudicial detention)
- Status: Named on the Saudi Arabian most wanted list, after his release.

Turki Mash Awi Zayid Al Asiri (March 8, 1975 – November 7, 2014) was a citizen of Saudi Arabia who was held in extrajudicial detention in the United States's Guantanamo Bay detention camps, in Cuba. His Guantanamo Internment Serial Number was 185. Joint Task Force Guantanamo counter-terrorism analysts reports that Al Asiri was born on March 8, 1975, in Yaboq, Saudi Arabia.

He was named on Saudi Arabian most wanted list on February 3, 2009. Asiri was the Emir of Al-Qaeda for Lahij Governorate. He was killed in Yemen by security forces on November 7, 2014.

== Combatant Status Review ==
A Summary of Evidence memo was prepared for his tribunal. The memo listed the following allegations against him:

a. The detainee is associated with al Qaida or Taliban forces:
1. The detainee is a Saudi Arabian citizen who volunteered to travel to Afghanistan via a flight from the United Arab Emirates to Karachi, Pakistan; to Hyderabad, Pakistan; to Safa, Pakistan; to Baker, Pakistan, and finally to a guesthouse in Kandahar, Afghanistan prior to 11 September 2001.
2. The detainee trained at the al Farouq camp for about one month.
3. The detainee received physical exercise and weapons training while at the al Farouq camp.
4. The detainee was in Jalalabad, Afghanistan on 11 September 2001 when the attacks occurred in the United States.
5. The detainee stated that due to the bombing by the United States, he and others retreated from Jalalabad, Afghanistan to the mountains, approximately three weeks after the 11 September 2001 attacks.
6. The detainee stated he traveled throughout Pakistan and Afghanistan for approximately six or seven months prior to his capture by Pakistani forces in December 2001.
7. An alias that may be associated with this detainee was listed on a document recovered during raids against al Qaida associates.

== Administrative Review Board hearing ==
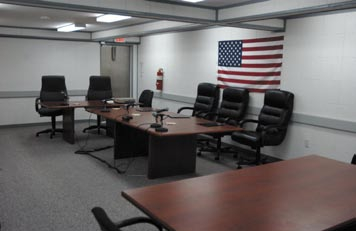
Hearing room where Guantanamo captive's annual Administrative Review Board hearings convened for captives whose Combatant Status Review Tribunal had already determined they were an "enemy combatant"

Detainees who were determined to have been properly classified as "enemy combatants" were scheduled to have their dossier reviewed at annual Administrative Review Board hearings. The Administrative Review Boards were not authorized to review whether a detainee qualified for POW status, and they were not authorized to review whether a detainee should have been classified as an "enemy combatant".

They were authorized to consider whether a detainee should continue to be detained by the United States, because they continued to pose a threat—or whether they could safely be repatriated to the custody of their home country, or whether they could be set free.

=== First annual Administrative Review Board ===
A Summary of Evidence memo was prepared for Turki Mash Awi Zayid Al Asiri's first annual Administrative Review Board, on 9 September 2005. The memo listed factors for and against his continued detention. The four page memo listed twenty-six "primary factors favor[ing] continued detention" and two "primary factors favor[ing] release or transfer".

The allegations he faced included:

- He was alleged to have sold his car to raise funds to travel to Afghanistan after hearing a fatwa from Sheikh Hamoud Alaugla.
- He was alleged to have been employed by the Al Rajhi Foundation to pass out Korans and work at an orphanage.
- He was alleged to have traveled to Afghanistan for jihadist training with Abu Bakr Al Jazairi.
- He was alleged to have traveled with three Tablighi Jamaat pilgrims he met in Pakistan.
- He was alleged to have been captured with an address book that contained names and phone numbers in Arabic.
- A satellite phone captured on October 7, 2001 had phoned one of the numbers also found in Turki's address book.
- A booklet found in a crate of ammunition contained phone numbers, including one also found in Turki's address book.
- A phone number found in his address book, may have been one of Amanullah Zadran, the younger brother of Pacha Khan Zadran, a local militia leader who did not always comply with direction from Hamid Karzai's government.
- His name was alleged to have been found on "a document listing 324 Arabic names, aliases, and nationalities". This list was during a safe house raid in Karachi. His entry on this list was alleged to have contained his name, alias, passport, and ATM card.

=== Second annual Administrative Review Board ===
A Summary of Evidence memo was prepared for Turki Mish'awi Za'id Alj-Amri's second annual Administrative Review Board, on 9 May 2006. The memo listed factors for and against his continued detention.

== Repatriation ==
On November 25, 2008, the Department of Defense published a list of when captives left Guantanamo. According to that list he was repatriated to Saudi custody on November 9, 2007, with thirteen other men. The records published from the captives' annual Administrative Reviews show his repatriation was not the outcome of the formal internal review procedures. The records show his detention was not reviewed in 2007.

At least ten other men in his release group were not repatriated through the formal review procedure.

Peter Taylor writing for the BBC News called the Saudis repatriated on November 9, 2007, with Al Assiri, "batch 10". He wrote that the BBC's research had found this batch to be a problematic cohort, and that four other men from this batch were named on the Saudi most wanted list.

== Named on a Saudi "most wanted" list ==
On February 3, 2009, the Saudi government published a list of 85 "most wanted" suspected terrorists, that included an individual identified as "Turki Mashawi Al Aseery". This list contained ten other former Guantanamo captives. Half of the eleven former captives listed on most wanted list were also from among the eleven men repatriated on November 9, 2007—in spite of their annual reviews recommending continued detention.
