= 2010 transatlantic aircraft bomb plot =

Failed terror attack

Cargo planes bomb plot
- Location: United States of America (target); East Midlands Airport and Dubai International Airport (discovered)
- Date: October 29, 2010 (discovered)
- Target: 2 planes
- Attack type: Bombing (failed)
- Weapons: Two packages, each containing a printer cartridge packed with a bomb made from the plastic explosive PETN
- Deaths: 0
- Injuries: 0
- Perpetrator: Al-Qaeda in the Arabian Peninsula

On October 29, 2010, two packages, each containing a bomb consisting of 300 to 400 grams (11–14 oz) of plastic explosives and a detonating mechanism, were found on separate cargo planes. The bombs were discovered as a result of intelligence received from Saudi Arabia's security chief. They were in transport from Yemen to the United States and were discovered at stopover locations: one at East Midlands Airport in the UK and one in Dubai in the United Arab Emirates.

One week later, al-Qaeda in the Arabian Peninsula (AQAP) claimed responsibility for the bombing plot, and for the September 3 crash of UPS Airlines Flight 6. While the crash of UPS Airlines Flight 6 was later confirmed as a technical issue unrelated to the bombing plot, American and British authorities believed that Anwar al-Awlaki of AQAP was behind the October bombing attempts and that the bombs were most likely constructed by AQAP's main explosives expert, Ibrahim Hassan al-Asiri. The bombs were probably designed to detonate in flight, with the intention of destroying both planes over Chicago or another American city. Each bomb had already been transported on passenger and cargo planes at the time of discovery.

== Locating the bombs ==
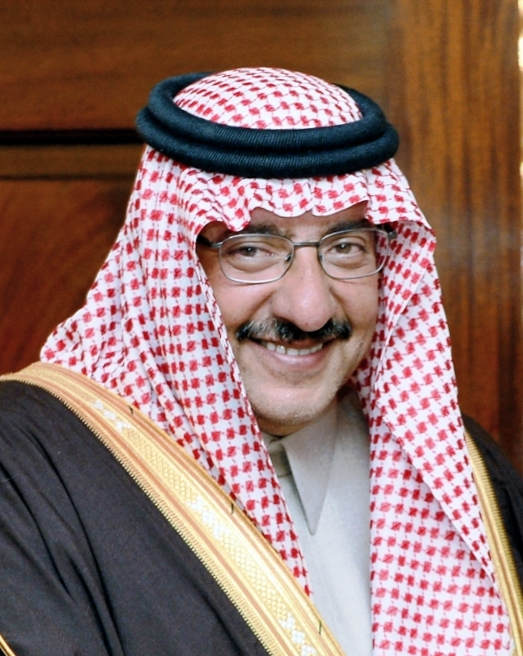
Prince Muhammad bin Nayef (photo) warned the U.S. deputy national security adviser of the bomb plot

On October 28, Saudi Arabia's deputy interior minister of counterterrorism, Prince Muhammad bin Nayef, called John Brennan, the U.S. deputy national security advisor for homeland security and counterterrorism and former Central Intelligence Agency station chief in Riyadh, to warn him of the plot. The Saudis provided the U.S. and Germany with the tracking numbers and destinations of the packages and informed them to look for toner cartridges. The packages had been deposited by a woman at FedEx and UPS offices in Sana'a, Yemen on October 27, and were scheduled to arrive in Chicago on November 1.

Saudi Arabia had reportedly learned of the plot through Jabir Jubran Al Fayfi, a former Guantánamo Bay detention camp inmate who had been remanded to Saudi Arabia for rehabilitation in 2006. Al-Faifi had escaped in 2008 and rejoined AQAP, but surrendered to Saudi authorities on October 16, 2010, and provided them with information about the plot. Yemeni officials suspected that al-Faifi had not actually rejoined al-Qaeda but had become a double agent. They said that his tip appeared to be based on more recent information than al-Faifi could access, and that the information must have come from a Saudi double agent in AQAP.

=== England ===
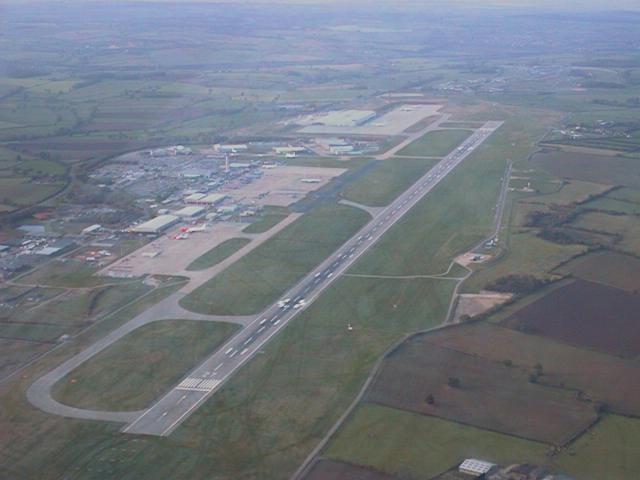
East Midlands Airport in Leicestershire

The first package left Sana'a, Yemen, on a passenger plane, flying to Dubai, United Arab Emirates. It then was next placed on a UPS cargo plane to Cologne/Bonn Airport in Germany, where UPS Airlines has a hub. There, it was placed on UPS Flight 232, a Boeing 767 cargo plane bound for East Midlands Airport in Leicestershire. From there, it was to fly to O'Hare International Airport in Chicago via Philadelphia, Pennsylvania.

The UPS plane landed at East Midlands Airport at 2:13 a.m. local time on October 29. British military and police explosives experts had been alerted to the existence of the bomb, and conducted an initial search of the plane's cargo in the airport's UPS parcels distribution depot. Officers from Scotland Yard Counter Terrorism Command joined them.

U.S. authorities provided the tracking number of the package, and the computer printer inside was scanned with explosives detection equipment, x-rayed, subjected to chemical swabs, and sniffed by sniffer dogs. No explosives were detected. Removing the suspect package for further examination, the authorities allowed the UPS plane to proceed to Philadelphia at 4:20 a.m. local time. At 10:00 a.m. the British gave the all-clear, and removed safety cordons from the airport.

Later forensic examination indicated that the bomb was inadvertently disarmed by Scotland Yard explosive officers, who took the printer cartridge out of the printer during their examination that morning, around three hours before the bomb was due to explode at 10:30 a.m. (5:30 a.m. Eastern time). The officers were unaware when they took the device apart that it was a bomb.

British officials continued to believe that there were no explosives in the package, but U.S. authorities insisted that the package be inspected again. British authorities then consulted with officials in Dubai, who had discovered a similar bomb in a printer cartridge, and MI6 spoke with the Saudi tipster. Scotland Yard explosives officers flew the printer and the cartridge in a police helicopter to the Defence Science and Technology Laboratory at Fort Halstead near London, and discovered the bomb at around 2:00 p.m.

=== Dubai ===
Qatar Airways said that the package with the second bomb had been carried on two of its commercial passenger jets. The first was a 144-seat Airbus A320 that flew from Sana'a, Yemen, to Doha International Airport in Doha, Qatar, on October 28. The second passenger plane was an Airbus A321 or Boeing 777 flying from Doha to Dubai. The seating capacity of the second plane was anywhere from 144 to 335, depending on which aircraft was used.

The second package was discovered on a FedEx Express plane at the FedEx depot at the Dubai airport at around 9:00 a.m. GMT on October 29. The plane was scheduled to fly to Newark Liberty International Airport in Newark, New Jersey, and then on to O'Hare International Airport in Chicago.

== Bombs ==
=== Addresses ===
The packages were addressed to former locations of two synagogues in Chicago. Investigators believe the terrorists used outdated information that they found online. One package was addressed to a church in Lakeview that had once been the meeting place of Congregation Or Chadash, and the other had been sent to a closed synagogue in East Rogers Park. Simon Calder observed in The Independent:

Yemen is not a natural provider of office supplies to organisations such as synagogues in the Chicago area. Therefore, you might fondly imagine that the staff in the parcels offices in the capital, Sana'a, might have checked the despatches more closely before allowing them anywhere near an aircraft, cargo or passengers. But they didn't.

The packages were addressed to specific people at the addresses—the names used were those of historical figures from the Spanish Inquisition and the Crusades. One package was addressed to Diego Deza, a Grand Inquisitor during the Spanish Inquisition. The other was addressed to Reynald Krak (Raynald of Châtillon), a French crusader who was beheaded in 1187 by Sultan Saladin of the 12th-century Muslim Ayyubid dynasty.

Brian Fishman of the New America Foundation said the choice of names was an inside joke. "The jihadis ... narrative is that non-Muslims are always on the attack, always trying to take Muslim lands. The jihadis like the narrative, because it justifies violence, since they claim that they’re only defending Islam," he said. He felt the destination of Chicago may have had meaning as well, as the latest edition of Inspire (AQAP's online magazine) may have had a photo of Chicago on its cover. Fishman points out that this parallels Osama bin Laden posing in front of a map of East Africa shortly before the 1998 United States embassy bombings. U.S. and UK officials believed the planes, and not the addresses on the ground, were the targets.

=== Contents ===
A toner cartridge from one of the recovered bombs showing white powder and wiring

Each package contained an HP LaserJet P2055 desktop laser printer. Inside each printer's toner cartridge was a sophisticated bomb. The cartridges were filled with pentaerythritol tetranitrate (PETN). The bomb found in the UK contained 400 grams (14 oz) of PETN, five times the amount needed to destroy a house. The one found in Dubai contained 300 grams (11 oz) of PETN. Hans Michels, professor of safety engineering at University College London, said that just 6 grams (0.2 oz) of PETN—around 2% of what was used—would be enough to blow a hole in a metal plate twice the thickness of an aircraft's skin. The PETN was of "an extremely high concentration", according to British criminal investigators. German investigators felt the device's construction would require "logistics that only state facilities should have access to".

The package intercepted in Dubai was shipped in a cardboard box that also contained souvenirs, clothes, compact discs, and several books written in English.

The bomb found in the UK was sent to the Defence Science and Technology Laboratory at Fort Halstead in Kent, and American technicians in the United Arab Emirates examined the other bomb.

=== Detonation ===
Detonators

Each bomb was triggered by a cell phone alarm, which activated a phone battery to send power through a thin wire filament inside a syringe containing 5 grams (0.18 oz) of lead azide, a powerful chemical initiator. Once hot, the lead azide would ignite, detonating the PETN. The device's wiring was set up so that all the printer components would appear to be correct if the device was x-rayed. Features not relevant to the alarm timer function, such as the display, had been removed to extend the battery life. The device was reported to carry markings resembling a Bird D736 cell phone.

There had initially been speculation that the bombs might be detonated by receipt of a telephone call or text message, but the SIM cards necessary to receive calls had been removed, rendering the phones unable to receive any communication, but increasing battery life. U.S. officials said that the bombs were set to go off shortly before the planes landed.

Mid-air capability

British Prime Minister David Cameron and officials in the U.S. believe that the bombs were designed to detonate as the planes were in flight, destroying the planes in mid-air. Britain's Home Secretary, Theresa May, said British investigators concluded the UK device was a functional bomb powerful enough to bring down the aircraft, causing a "supersonic blast". Brennan agreed with this assessment.

Cargo vs. passenger planes

Brennan said it was not clear whether those attempting the bombing knew whether the packages would be carried on cargo or passenger planes. Since Yemen does not have any regularly scheduled cargo flights, the perpetrators likely knew the bombs would end up on passenger planes. Most of the air freight arriving in the U.S. is on passenger flights.

=== Detection ===
Like many explosives, PETN has a low vapor pressure. This makes it difficult to detect, because the chemical releases little vapor into the surrounding air. Frank Cilluffo, the director of the Homeland Security Policy Institute at George Washington University, said: "It is evident that had we not had the intelligence, our security countermeasures would not have identified these improvised explosive devices." Qatar Airways said that "the explosives discovered were of a sophisticated nature whereby they could not be detected by x-ray screening or trained sniffer dogs", and were only discovered after intelligence services received a tip.

Both packages were x-rayed in Sana'a, and the one in Dubai was x-rayed there, without the bombs being spotted. A spokesman for the German Federal Criminal Police Office, where the Dubai x-rays were reviewed, stated they would not have detected the bomb. When X-rayed, PETN would resemble the cartridge's powdered ink, and the timers resembled the normal printer cartridge electronics.

=== Preparation ===
Previously, in mid-September 2010, U.S. intelligence intercepted three packages linked to AQAP that had been shipped from Yemen to Chicago. They searched the packages, but did not find any explosives. One of the packages included the 1860 novel The Mill on the Floss, by English novelist George Eliot, a woman who wrote under an assumed identity. The packages, addressed to "random addresses" in Chicago, were not confiscated.

Authorities surmised, after the October incident, that the September parcels may have been a test run.

== Responsibility ==
=== Al-Qaeda in the Arabian Peninsula ===
On November 5, 2010, al-Qaeda in the Arabian Peninsula (AQAP) took responsibility for the plot, posting on a number of radical Islamist websites monitored by the SITE Intelligence Group and the NEFA Foundation. "We will continue to strike blows against American interests and the interest of America's allies," said the perpetrators. "Since both operations were successful, we intend to spread the idea to our mujahedeen brothers in the world and enlarge the circle of its application to include civilian aircraft in the West as well as cargo aircraft." U.S. Secretary of Homeland Security, Janet Napolitano, British Home Secretary Theresa May, and Dubai police had noted that these types of explosives are "hallmarks" of AQAP, and had suspected they were behind the attack.

AQAP also claimed responsibility for the crash of UPS Airlines Flight 6, a Boeing 747-400 cargo plane that crashed in Dubai on September 3. U.S. and United Arab Emirates investigators had said they had not found any evidence of an explosion or terrorist involvement in that incident, and were skeptical about the claim. They suggested it was probably an attempt by AQAP to bolster its image. On September 10, the FBI and the U.S. Department of Homeland Security confirmed that the AQAP was not involved in the September 3 crash.

On November 21, AQAP provided a detailed account of the plot, including photos of the printer bombs, in its English-language magazine Inspire. The article said that the mission was a success, because it caused a huge amount of disruption to the world's air traffic and security systems at the very low cost of $4,200.

=== Anwar al-Awlaki ===
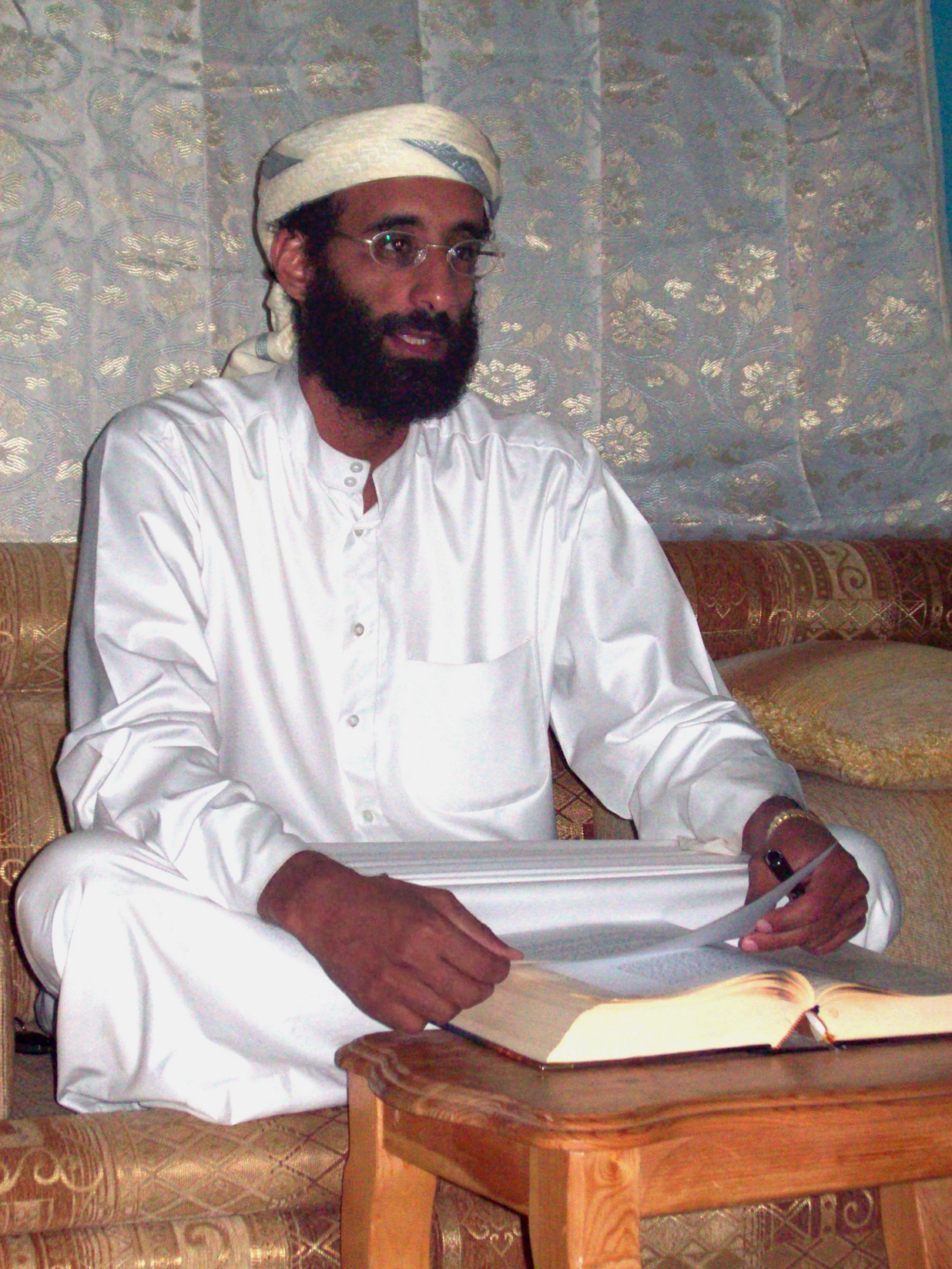
Anwar al-Awlaki, primary suspect of US and UK officials

The Guardian reported that unnamed U.S. counter-terrorism officials suspected that Anwar al-Awlaki of AQAP was behind the plot. "Anybody associated with al-Qaeda in the Arabian Peninsula is a subject of concern," Brennan said. The New York Times reported that "some analysts believe the [attempted Chicago bombing] may also be linked to Mr. Awlaki". The Daily Telegraph reported that "U.S. and British security officials believe" al-Awlaki was behind the attack.

Al-Awlaki had also been linked to the 2009 Fort Hood shooting, the failed 2009 Christmas Day bombing, the failed 2010 Times Square car bombing attempt, and other terrorist incidents, and had been placed by U.S. President Barack Obama on a targeted killing list. The American Civil Liberties Union and the Center for Constitutional Rights sued in an attempt to prevent his death. Al-Awlaki was killed in a targeted killing in September 2011.

=== Ibrahim Hassan al-Asiri ===
US officials suggested that Ibrahim Hassan al-Asiri, the main explosives expert for Al-Qaeda in the Arabian Peninsula, likely built the bombs. He has a history of creating explosive devices using PETN. Brennan said that the evidence pointed to the bombs having been built by the same person who made the device worn by Umar Farouk Abdulmutallab, who attempted to detonate a bomb on a plane on Christmas Day 2009. One of the detonators was almost identical to the one used in that attack.

Al-Asiri had previously recruited his younger brother Abdullah as a suicide bomber, hiding a PETN bomb in his rectum in an attempt on the life of security chief Mohammed bin Nayef. Abdullah died in the attempt, but Nayef survived with minor injuries.

=== Released suspect ===
On October 30, 2010, a 22-year-old female Yemeni engineering student was arrested in Sana'a, Yemen, on suspicion of having shipped the packages. Her mother was also arrested. Both were released the following day when it was determined that the woman's identification had been stolen.

== Responses ==
=== Political ===
Obama and his administration reacted quickly to the incident, making public statements that it was a "credible threat". A New York Times opinion piece suggested that the quick response would be well received politically for the 2010 U.S. elections.

=== Security ===
Security alerts were triggered in the U.S., the UK, and the Middle East. An Emirates flight containing a package in transit from Yemen to the U.S. was intercepted by Canadian CF-18 and U.S. F-15 fighter jets and escorted to New York as a precaution. Two FedEx planes containing packages originating from Yemen were also searched.

The UK, the U.S., Germany, France, and Belgium stopped accepting freight package cargo shipments from Yemen, and the Netherlands and Canada suspended all cargo flights from Yemen. Germany suspended passenger flights from Yemen until November 15. Britain and the U.S. stopped accepting air cargo from Somalia, and prohibited passengers from carrying certain printer cartridges on flights. The Swedish government recommended that its citizens not travel to Yemen until further notice.

FedEx, UPS, and Mideast-based shipper Aramex suspended their shipping operations in Yemen. The airlines Emirates and Air Arabia stopped carrying cargo from Yemen, and Abu Dhabi-based Etihad Airways stopped carrying cargo from Yemen and Somalia.

The U.S. increased air passenger screenings and initiated a more detailed passenger search procedure. American Civil Liberties Union counsel Chris Calabrese said that "Americans now must choose between a virtual strip search and a grope."

The incident was one of the factors leading the European Commission to review the European Union's approach to customs risk management and supply chain security in 2012–13.

=== Al-Awlaki ===
On November 2, four days after the bombs were discovered, al-Awlaki was charged in absentia in Sana'a with plotting to kill foreigners and being an al-Qaeda member in an unrelated matter. On November 6, Yemeni Judge Mohsen Alwan ordered that al-Awlaki be caught dead or alive.

== See also ==
- List of accidents and incidents involving commercial aircraft
- List of terrorist incidents in 2010
