= Adnan bin Abdullah bin Faris al Omari =

Saudi Arabian on Saudi Arabia's most wanted terrorist suspects list

- عدنان بن عبد الله بن فارس العمري
- Known for: listed on the Saudi most wanted list

Adnan bin Abdullah bin Faris al Omari (Arabic: عدنان بن عبد الله بن فارس العمري) is a citizen of Saudi Arabia who was named on a list of Saudi Arabia's most wanted terrorist suspects. The list of 36 names was published on June 28, 2005. Saudi security officials reported he was transferred to Saudi Arabian custody in November 2005.
