= Obaida Abdul-Rahman Al Otaibi =

Saudi Arabian journalist

Obaida Abdul-Rahman Al Otaibi is a Saudi Arabian journalist who was on the Saudi list of most wanted suspected terrorists.

== Background ==
Obaida Attended Imam Mohamed Bin Saud University in the late 1990s, where he earned a degree in media. After graduation, he started working at Saudi Al-Jazirah. His former boss, Abdul-Elahi Al Qasim stated he was one of the first Saudi journalists to include his email address in his byline. He stated that Obaida had shown no signs of extremist ideology while with the paper.

Obaida left Saudi Arabia for the United Arab Emirates in 2005.

The most wanted list was published in late January 2009, and includes 85 names. Obaida's is the fiftieth name on the list. His listing accused him of "planning to target vital infrastructure within Saudi Arabia."

Obaida attended the same high school, the Al Shifa Religious Academy, as "Eisa Al-Awsham, a former Al Qaeda commander." Eisa Al-Awsham was killed in a shootout with Saudi security officials on July 19, 2004.
