= Ahmad Abdul-Rahman Saqr al-Fadhli =

Ahmad Abdul-Rahman Saqr al-Fadhli was a citizen of Saudi Arabia. He first became notable in 2003, when the government of Saudi Arabia listed him on the 2003 version of its Saudi list of most wanted terrorists. He was killed in a shootout with Saudi security officials in April 2004.
