= Qasim al-Raymi =

Yemeni al-Qaeda member (1978–2020)

Qasim al-Raymi قاسم الريمي

2nd Emir of al-Qaeda in the Arabian Peninsula
- In office 16 June 2015 – 29 January 2020
- Preceded by: Nasir al-Wuhayshi
- Succeeded by: Khalid Batarfi

Personal details
- Born: 5 June 1978 Nimr, As Salafiyah, Raymah Governorate, North Yemen
- Died: 29 January 2020 (aged 41) Wald Rabi', Al Bayda Governorate, Yemen

Military service
- Allegiance: Al-Qaeda: Al-Qaeda in Yemen (1998–2009); AQAP (2009–2020)
- Years of service: 1990s–2020
- Battles/wars: Yemen Insurgency; 2012 Abyan offensive; Yemeni Civil War; Battle of Mukalla (2015); Battle of Mukalla (2016); Abyan conflict (2016-2017)

Qasim Muhammad Mahdi al-Raymi (Arabic: قاسم محمد مهدي الريمي; 5 June 1978 – 29 January 2020) was a Yemeni militant who was the emir of al-Qaeda in the Arabian Peninsula (AQAP). Al-Raymi was one of 23 men who escaped in the 3 February 2006 prison-break in Yemen, along with other notable al-Qaeda members. Al-Raymi was connected to a July 2007 suicide bombing that killed eight Spanish tourists. In 2009, the Yemeni government accused him of being responsible for the running of an al-Qaeda training camp in Abyan province. After operating as AQAP's military commander, al-Raymi was promoted to leader after the death of Nasir al-Wuhayshi on 12 June 2015.

== Early life, Afghanistan and al-Qaeda in Yemen ==
Al-Raymi was born on 5 June 1978 in the Raymah Governorate, near the Yemen capital of Sana'a. He was a trainer at an al-Qaeda camp in Afghanistan during the 1990s before returning to Yemen. In 2004, he was imprisoned for five years over suspected involvement in a series of embassy bombings in the capital.

After escaping from prison in 2006, al-Raymi, along with Nasir al-Wuhayshi, oversaw the formation of al-Qaeda in Yemen, which took in both new recruits and experienced Arab fighters returning from battlefields across Iraq and Afghanistan.

The group claimed responsibility for two suicide bomb attacks that killed six Western tourists before being linked to the assault on the US embassy in Sana'a in September 2008, in which militants detonated bombs and fired rocket-propelled grenades. Ten Yemeni guards and four civilians were killed, along with six assailants.

== Founding of AQAP ==
In January 2009, al-Raymi, along with three other men, appeared in a video calling for the foundation of al-Qaeda in the Arabian Peninsula, a unification of both al-Qaeda's Yemen and Saudi Arabian branches. He was introduced as AQAP's military commander. The other men were identified as Abu Hareth Muhammad al-Oufi, Abu Sufyan al-Azdi al-Shahri and Nasir al-Wuhayshi.

Abu Hareth Muhammad al-Oufi was an AQAP field commander, Abu Sufyan al-Azdi al-Shahri was the deputy leader of AQAP and Nasir al-Wuhayshi the former emir of AQAP.

== Military commander of AQAP ==
=== Saudi and American wanted list ===
On 3 February 2009, Saudi security officials published a new list of Saudi most wanted terrorist suspects. The 68th individual found on the list was named "Muhammad Qasim Mehdi Reemy" or "Qassem Mohammed Mahdi Al-Rimi", with the aliases "Abu Hurayrah" and "Abu Ammar". Qassem Al-Rimi on the Saudi wanted list was one of two Yemenis on the list, and was said to be "linked to Al Qaeda in Yemen, Saudi Arabia". A few days later an anonymous Saudi official supplied documents to the Associated Press, which alleged that al-Raymi had "links to a plot targeting the U.S. ambassador in San'a." The documents also reported that he rented the house where the operation was planned and that he "monitored the US embassy".

On 11 May 2010, the U.S. State Department listed al-Raymi as a Specially Designated Global Terrorist. On 14 October 2014, it announced a reward of $5 million for any information leading to his capture or death.

=== Previous reports of death ===
Al-Raymi's death has been reported several times. He was reported to have died during a raid by Yemeni security officials on 9 August 2007. Ali bin Ali Douha and two other militants were reported to have been killed during the raid.

Raymi was the target of a raid on al-Qaeda camps in Yemen on 17 December 2009, which reportedly was carried out by U.S. cruise missiles. He was not reported killed.

It was reported that he was killed in a 4 January 2010 raid by Yemeni security forces, though this was proven false. However, according to officials, a Yemeni air strike on two cars, one of which reportedly contained al-Raymi, was conducted on Friday, 15 January 2010. Al-Raymi was reported to be one of those killed. Of the eight men thought to be in the two cars, six are thought to have been killed in the strike.

Following reports of his death, al-Raymi was described as the military commander for Al Qaeda in the Arabian Peninsula (AQAP). He was reported to have "orchestrated" 25 December 2009 attempted suicide bombing of Nigerian Umar Farouq Abdulmutallab. Al-Raymi announced the creation of an "Aden-Abyan Army" to free the country of "crusaders and their apostate agents," in an Internet audio tape.

=== Apology for hospital attack ===
Following the 2013 attack on the Yemeni Defense Ministry, which resulted in the killing of numerous doctors and patients at a hospital present in the compound, al-Raymi released a video message apologizing, claiming that the team of attackers were directed not to assault the hospital in the attack, but that one had gone ahead and done so.

=== Yakla raid ===
On 29 January 2017, al-Raymi was the supposed target of a military action undertaken by the United States known as the Yakla raid. The raid resulted in the death of a Navy SEAL and of a number of civilians including a U.S. citizen. Shortly after the raid, on 5 February 2017, al-Raymi released an audiotape onto the internet referencing the raid. The fact that al-Raymi had been a main target of the raid had not been previously confirmed. In the audiotape, al-Raymi confirmed he was still alive and taunted U.S. President Donald Trump.

== Emir of AQAP ==
On 16 June 2015, following the death of former AQAP Emir and founder Nasir al-Wuhayshi, AQAP commander Khaled Batarfi confirmed al-Raymi had been elected by the group's leadership council to succeed Wuhayshi.

On 8 July 2015, al-Raymi swore allegiance to al-Qaeda emir Ayman al Zawahiri. He congratulated the recent successes of the al-Qaeda affiliate in Syria, al-Nusra Front, and the gains made by Army of Conquest coalition in Syria. He called for renewed attacks against the United States, remarking ""All of you must direct and gather your arrows and swords against [America].". Reports say that on 28 June 2016, an airstrike targeted the home of Qasim in Abyan Governorate, killing five people, including two family members of the targeted leader. Qasim survived the attack, with only some wounds.

On 18 October 2016, the US State Department announced that it is offering rewards of $5 and $10 million for information concerning al-Raymi and another AQAP leader. The US State Department offered $10 million for information on al-Raymi and $5 million for Khalid al-Batarfi.

For more than five years al-Raymi had eluded U.S. forces as he led what experts sometimes refer to as al-Qaida's "most dangerous franchise." He was the target of the 29 Jan. 2017 special operations raid in which Navy SEAL William Owens was killed.

== Death ==
On 31 January 2020, The New York Times reported that three U.S. officials "expressed confidence" that al-Raymi, the emir of AQAP was killed by a U.S. airstrike on 29 January, (Note: There were two U.S. airstrikes in the previous week in Yemen, the first was on 25 January, in Al Abdiyah District, Ma'rib Governorate, which led to killing an individual, whose identity is unknown. The second airstrike was on 27 January, which killed Abdullah Al-Adani.) while traveling in a car with another senior AQAP leader, Abu Al-Baraa Al-Ibby, in the Yakla area of Wald Rabi' District, Al Bayda Governorate, Yemen, according to local sources, although there was no official confirmation.

On 1 February 2020, U.S. President Donald Trump appeared to confirm reports that the U.S. had killed Qassim al-Rimi, the leader of an al Qaeda affiliate in Yemen by retweeting reports claiming that the CIA had conducted a drone strike targeting the AQAP leader. Some experts considered him to be a possible successor to Ayman al-Zawahiri, the leader of al-Qaeda overall.

On 6 February 2020, the White House released a statement confirming al-Rimi's death.

On 23 February 2020, AQAP confirmed al-Rimi's death and announced Khalid Batarfi as his successor.

== Family ==
One of al-Raymi's brothers is Ali Yahya Mahdi Al Raimi, a Yemeni held at the Guantanamo Bay detention center. Ali Yahya Mahdi Al Raimi was transferred from Guantanamo to Saudi Arabia in 2016.
