= Faisal Abdulrahman Abdullah Aldakheel =

Faisal Abdulrahman Abdullah Aldakheel (Arabic: فيصل عبدالرحمن عبدالله الدخيل) was a citizen of Saudi Arabia. In 2003 the government of Saudi Arabia listed him on its Saudi list of most wanted terrorists. Faisal is the older brother of Bandar Abdulrahman Abdullah Aldakheel and the cousin of Ahmad N. Al-Dakheel, both appeared on the Saudi list of most wanted terrorists. His brother Bandar left home in 2002, and was later listed as No. 9 on the country's 26 most wanted terrorist list and took part in the bombings at Al-Muhaya on December 9, 2003. His brother Bandor was killed by Saudi military forces in Al-Qassim on May 20, 2004. Faisal was one of the first "19 Most Wanted" terrorists by Saudi Arabia officials having first been added to the list on May 5, 2003, just a week before the suicide attacks in Riyadh, Saudi Arabia which he helped orchestrate.

He was the deputy of Abdel Aziz al-Muqrin who was the head of Al Qaeda in Saudi Arabia. On May 7, 2004, Saudi police raided a safe house where he had been staying in Ashbelya district in central Saudi Arabia, but he was able to escape. During the raid, the police discovered of large cache of weapons, including 55 hand grenades and 330 kilograms of explosives. He would later be witnessed on videotape at the machine gunning ambush of Robert Jacobs, an employee for the Vinnell Corporation was murdered June 8, 2004 in the garage at his home in Riyadh. He was killed in a shootout with Saudi security officials with his superior, Abdel Aziz al-Muqrin during a police pursuit on April 18, 2004, following the kidnapping and beheading of Paul M. Johnson.
