= Saudi list of most-wanted suspected terrorists =

Periodically Saudi Arabia's Ministry of Interior publishes a most wanted list. According to Asharq Alawsat Saudi Arabia has published four lists of "most wanted" suspected terrorists, and those lists contained 19, 26, 36 and 85 individuals.

The list of 85 most wanted suspected terrorists published in February 2009 named eleven former Guantanamo captives.

== Earlier lists ==
On May 7, 2003, the Saudi Interior Ministry announced a list of 19 names who it said were planning to carry out subversive activities. On May 12, 2003, the Riyadh compound bombings took place.

	English	Arabic	
1	Turki Nasir Al-Dandani	تركي ناصر الدندني	died by suicide July 2003 in al-Jawf
2	Ali A. Al-Ghamdi	علي عبد الرحمن الفقعسي الغامدي	surrendered 26 June 2003
3	Khalid al-Juhani	خالد محمد الجهني	one of twelve dead perpetrators of the Riyadh compound bombings.
4	Saleh M. al-Oufi	صالح محمد عوض الله العلوي العوفي	became the leader after al-Muqrin death, killed 17 or 18 August 2005 in Madinah
5	Abdel Aziz al-Muqrin	عبد العزيز عيسى المقرن	became the leader after al-Ayiri's death, killed in Riyadh 18 June 2004
6	Abdulrahman M. Yazji	عبدالرحمن محمد يازجي	killed 6 April 2005
7	Hani S. Al-Ghamdi	هاني سعيد الغامدي	
8	Mohammed O. Al-Waleedi Al-Shihri	محمد عثمان الوليدي الشهري	
9	Rakan M. Al-Saikhan	راكان محسن الصيخان	killed 12 April 2004 in Riyadh
10	Yusuf Salih al-Ayiri	يوسف صالح العييري الملقب بالبتار	Islamic scholar, writer and al-Qaeda member killed June 2003 in Saudi Arabia
11	Othman H. Al Maqboul al-'Amari	عثمان هادي آل مقبول العمري	recanted, under an amnesty deal, 28 June 2004
12	Bandar A. Al-Ghamdi	بندر عبد الرحمن الغامدي	captured September 2003 in Yemen and extradited to KSA
13	Ahmad N. Al-Dakheel	أحمد ناصر الدخيل	killed on July 28 in a police raid on a farm in Al-Qassim Province
14	Hamid F. Al-Asalmi al-Shammri	حمد فهد الأسلمي الشمري	
15	Faisal A. Al-Dakheel	فيصل عبدالرحمن الدخيل	killed with al-Muqrin
16	Sultan J. Al-Qahtani alias Zubayr Al-Rimi	سلطان جبران القحطاني	q.v., killed 23 September 2003 in Jizan
17	Jubran A. Hakami	جبران علي حكمي	
18	Abdul-Rahman M. Jabarah	عبدالرحمن منصور جبارة	"Canadian-Kuwaiti of Iraqi origin", dead according to al-Qaeda; brother of Kuwaiti-Canadian Mohamed Mansour Jabarah
19	Khalid A. Hajj or Abu-Hazim al-Sha'ir	خالد علي بن علي حاج	leader, killed in Riyadh March or April 2004

== List of December 6, 2003 ==
A list published on December 5, 2003 contained twenty-six names. When a new list was published in February 2009 Carol Rosenberg, writing in the Miami Herald, reported that all, but one of the captives had been killed or captured.

December 6, 2003 list
rank	name	nation
1.	Abdulaziz Abdulmuhsin Almughrin	Saudi
2.	Rakan Muhsin Mohammad Alsaykhan	Saudi
3.	Khalid Ali Ali-Haj	Yemeni
4.	Kareem Altohami Almojati	Moroccan
5.	Salih Mohammad Awadallah Alalawy Aloafi	Saudi
6.	Ibrahim Mohammad Abdullah Alrayis	Saudi
7.	Saud Homood Obaid Alqotaini Alotaibi	Saudi
8.	Ahmad Abdul-Rahman Saqr al-Fadhli	Saudi
9.	Sultan Bjad So'doon Alotaibi	Saudi
10.	Abdullah Saud Abunayan Alsobaie'e	Saudi
11.	Faisal Abdulrahman Abdullah Aldakheel	Saudi
12.	Faris al-Zahrani	Saudi
13.	Khalid Mobarak Habeeb-Allah Alqurashi	Saudi
14.	Mansoor Mohammad Ahmad Faqeeh	Saudi
15.	Isa Saad Mohammad bin O'ooshan	Saudi
16.	Talib Saud Abdullah Al Talib	Saudi
17.	Mostafa Ibrahim Mohammad Mobaraki	Saudi
18.	Abulmajeed Mohammad Abdullah Almoneea'	Saudi
19.	Nasir Rashid Nasir Alrashid	Saudi
20.	Bandar Abdulrahman Abdullah Aldakheel	Saudi
21.	Othman Hadi Al Maqboul al-Amri	Saudi
22.	Talal A'nbar Ahmad A'nbari	Saudi
23.	A'amir Mohsin Moreef Al Zaidan Alshihri	Saudi
24.	Abdullah Mohammad Rashid Alroshood	Saudi
25.	Abdulrahman Mohammad Mohammad Yazji	Saudi
26.	Hosain Mohammad Alhasaki	Moroccan

== List of June 28, 2005 ==
The list of June 28, 2005 contained thirty-six names. The Saudi government encouraged those named on the list to surrender, and promised lenient treatment. By April 7, 2007 the Saudi government reported that twenty-three of those individuals had been killed or captured.

36 individuals wanted by Saudi Arabia on 2005-06-28
name		status	notes
Younis Mohammed Ibrahim al-Hayari	2005-07-03	KIA	36-year-old Moroccan; overstayed his visa when on the Hajj; hid out with his wife and daughter; killed in a shootout in Rawda.; described as the head of Al Qaeda in Saudi Arabia.
Fahd Farraj Mohammed Aljuwair	2006-02-27	KIA	35-year-old Saudi national
Zaid Saad Zaid Alsammari	2005-09-07	KIA	Killed in raid September 4–7, 2005
Abdulrahman Salih Abdulrahman Almit'eb	2005-12-27	KIA	a 26-year-old Saudi
Salih Mansour Mohsin Alfiraidi Alharbi	2005-09-07	KIA	a 22-year-old Saudi; Killed in raid September 4–7, 2005
Sultan Salih Hosan Alhasri	2005-09-07	KIA	a 26-year-old Saudi; Killed in raid September 4–7, 2005
Mohammed Abdulrahman Alsuwailmi	2005-12-27	KIA	a 23-year-old Saudi;
Mohammed Salih Mohammed Alghaith	2006-02-24	KIA	a 23-year-old Saudi
Abdullah Abdulaziz Ibrahim Altuwaijri	2006-02-24	KIA	a 21-year-old Saudi
Mohammed Saeed Mohammed Alsiyam Alamri	2005-07-25	Arrested	a 25-year-old Saudi
Ibrahim Abdullah Ibrahim Almateer	2006-02-27	KIA	a 21-year-old Saudi
Waleed Mutlaq Salim Alraddadi			a 21-year-old Saudi
Naif Farhan Jalal Aljihaishi Alshammari	2005-09-07	KIA	a 24-year-old Saudi; Killed in raid September 4–7, 2005
Majed Hamid Abdullah Alhasiri	2005-08-18	KIA	a 29-year-old Saudi; Reportedly exploded a suicide belt, during an attempt to capture him by Saudi security officials.
Abdullah Mohayya Shalash Alsilaiti Alshammari	2006-02-27	KIA	a 24-year-old Saudi
Noor Mohammed Musa			a 21-year-old Chadian national.
Manoor Mohammed Yousef			a 24-year-old Chadian national.
Othman Mohammed Hasan Korati			a 23-year-old Chadian national.
Mohsen Ayed Fadhel Alfadhli			a 25-year-old Kuwaiti national.
Abdullah Wild Mohammed Sayyed			a 37-year-old Mauritanian national.
Zaid Hasan Mohammed Hameed		Arrested	a 34-year-old Yemeni national.; Under arrest in Yemen
Fahd Salih Rizqallah Almohayyani			a 24-year-old Saudi.
Adnan bin Abdullah bin Faris al Omari	2005-11-08	Extradited	a 28-year-old Saudi.; Transferred to Saudi Arabia on September 11, 2005.
Marzooq Faisal Marzooq Alotaibi			a 32-year-old Saudi.
Adel Abdullatif Ibrahim Alsaneea'			a 27-year-old Saudi
Mohammed Abdulrahman Mohammed Aldeet			a 21-year-old Saudi.
Sultan Sinaitan Mohammed Aldeet			a 24-year-old Saudi.
Salih Saeed Albitaih Alghamdi			a 40-year-old Saudi.
Fayez Ibrahim Omer Ayyoub	2005-07-01	Surrendered	a 30-year-old Saudi
Khalid Mohammed Abbas Alharbi			a 29-year-old Saudi
Mohammed Othman Mufreh Alzahrani			a 44-year-old Saudi
Abdullah Mohammed Salih Alramyan			a 27-year-old Saudi
Mohammed Salih Sulaiman Alrushoodi			a 24-year-old Saudi
Saad Mohammed Mubarak Aljubairi Alshihri			a 31-year-old Saudi
Ali Mater Ibrahim Alosaimi			a 23-year-old Saudi.
Faris Abdullah Salim Aldhahiri Alharbi			a 22-year-old Saudi; His younger brother Rayed Abdullah Salem Al Harbi was killed in a shootout with Saudi police, in October 2009, while dressed in a head-to-toe women's garment, and while wearing an explosive suicide belt.

== List of February 3, 2009 ==
The most recently published list was published on February 3, 2009. It listed 85 individuals, 83 of whom were Saudis, and two were from Yemen. Carol Rosenberg, reporting in the Miami Herald, wrote that six of the men on the new most wanted list were former Guantanamo captives. Robert Worth, reporting in the New York Times, wrote that fourteen Saudis, formerly held in Guantanamo, had fallen under suspicion of supporting terrorism following their release. The men were all believed to be living outside of Saudi Arabia, some of them receiving militant training. They were promised lenient treatment, and encouraged to turn themselves in at the nearest Saudi embassy.

Those on the new list include three Saudis who appeared in a threatening al Qaeda video: Said Ali al-Shihri, Abu Hareth Muhammad al-Awfi and Nasir al-Wuhayshi, and another individual named Abdullah al-Qarawi. Al-Wuhayshi claims he is the leader of Al-Qaida in the Arabian Peninsula. Al-Shihri and Al-Awfi are former Guantanamo captives, and Al-Shihri stated he was Al-Wuyashi's deputy.

The Saudi Gazette reported that Saudi security officials identified an individual named Saleh Al-Qaraawi as the leader of Al Qaeda in Saudi Arabia.

An article published in Asharq Alawsat on February 6, 2009, noted the range in age among the suspects—from seventeen to fifty-two. This article named Abdullah El Qarawi, who it described as the "most dangerous" individual on the list, as the leader of Al Qaeda operations in the Persian Gulf. According to the article Abdullah El Qarawi is just 26 years old, and most of the individuals on the list are between 25 and 25. The article listed the names and ages of fifteen other individuals.

Another article in the Asharq Alawsat identified other individual from the list, including: Abdullah al-Abaed—wanted for the assassination of a senior police official, and Mohamed Abul-Khair, one of Osama bin Laden's bodyguards, and one of his sons-in-law.

On February 7, 2009 the Saudi Gazette reported some details of some of the wanted men. The article named seven men it identified as former Guantanamo captives, and five other most wanted suspected terrorists it did not identify as former Guantanamo captives.

Individuals said to be named on the February 2009 list
ISN	Rank	Age	Names	Notes
71		27	Mish'al Muhammad Rashid Al-Shedocky	Repatriated on May 14, 2003—one of the first captives to be repatriated.; His repatriation was reported to have been part of an exchange of prisoners that resulted in the release of five United Kingdom citizens.; In 2014, AQAP indicated in a three-part documentary about the group's former deputy leader Said Ali al-Shihri’s life and death that al-Shedocky was dead by having the phrase "May Allah accept him" posted next to his name. The phrase is reserved for jihadists who have been killed in battle. The group did not provide any details on al-Shedocky's death.
105		31	Adnan Muhammed Ali Al Saigh	Repatriated on May 19, 2006.; The Saudi Gazette reported he is believed to have traveled to a neighboring country with his brother-in-law, fellow suspect and fellow former Guantanamo captive, Othman al-Ghamdi, leaving behind his wife and son.
114		23	Yousuf Mohammed Mubarak Al Jubairi Al Shahri	Possibly the brother in law of fellow suspect and former Guantanamo captive Sa'id Ali Jabir Al Khathim Al Shihri.; Repatriated to Saudi Arabia on November 9, 2007.; Killed in a firefight with Saudi police on October 18, 2009 together with Rayed Abdullah Salem Al Harbi.
177			Fahd Salih Sulayman Al Jutayli	According to his mother he was living openly in Saudi Arabia just days prior to the publication of the most wanted list.; Reported to have been killed by Yemeni security officials in September 2009.
184		35	Othman Ahmad Othman al-Ghamdi	Repatriated on June 24, 2006.; Worked as a car dealer following his release.; The Saudi Gazette reported he is believed to have traveled to a neighboring country with his brother-in-law, fellow suspect and fellow former Guantanamo captive, Adnan Al-Sayegh, leaving behind his wife and son.
185		31	Turki Mash Awi Zayid Al Asiri	Rrepatriated to Saudi custody on November 9, 2007, with thirteen other men.; Name and age are a close match to former Guantanamo captive Turki Mash Awi Zayid Al Asiri.
187		32	Murtadha al Said Makram	Repatriated to Saudi Arabia on November 9, 2007.; Repatriated in spite of the annual review procedures recommending his continued detention.
188		34	Jabir Jubran Al Fayfi	Identified as a former captive Jaber Al-Faifi; Repatriated on February 21, 2007.; Repatriated in spite of the annual review procedures recommending his continued detention.
192		29	Ibrahim Sulayman Muhammad Arbaysh	Repatriated on December 14, 2006 with sixteen other men.
333		35	Mohamed Atiq Awayd Al Harbi	Repatriated to Saudi Arabia on November 9, 2007.; Appeared in a threatening video from Al-Qaida in the Arabian Peninsula.; Also identified as Mohamed Atiq Awayd Al Harbi.; Repatriated in spite of the annual review procedures recommending his continued detention.; Reported to have turned himself in Saudi Authorities on February 18, 2009.
372		35	Said Ali al-Shihri	Repatriated to Saudi Arabia on November 9, 2007.; Claimed he was the deputy leader of Al-Qaida in the Arabian Peninsula.; Repatriated in spite of the annual review procedures recommending his continued detention.; Killed in a drone strike in Yemen in 2013.
			Nasir al-Wuhayshi	Appeared in a threatening video from Al-Qaida in the Arabian Peninsula.; Claims he is the leader of Al-Qaida in the Arabian Peninsula.
		34	Mohamed Abul-Khair	Reported to be Osama bin Laden's son-in-law.; Reportedly a link to Ramzi bin al-Shibh.
		16 or 17	Abdullah Al Jebairi Al Shahri	Nephew of fellow suspect Yusuf Al Jebairi Al Shahri.; Reportedly smuggled into Yemen, by his uncle, to join al Qaida.
		20	Baheij Al-Buheajy	
	29	20	Rayed Abdullah Salem Al Harbi	Killed in a firefight with Saudi police on October 18, 2009 together with Yussef Al Shihri.
		21	Naif Mohamed Al Qahtani	
		21	Hamd Hussein Nasser Al Hussein	
		22	Hassan Ibrahim Hamd Al Shaban	
		23	Abdullah al-Asiri	Attempted to assassinate Saudi Prince Muhammad bin Nayef with a suicide bomb. Al Aseery told security officials he wanted to surrender, but asked to meet the Prince personally.
		26	Saleh Al-Qaraawi	Reportedly was the leader of Al Qaeda in Saudi Arabia.; Also referred to as "Abdullah Al-Qaraawi."; Described as the "most dangerous" individual on the list.; Captured in Saudi Arabia on June 9, 2012 after being gravely injured in a drone strike in Pakistan.
		31	Ahmed Abdullah Al Zahrani	
		37	Ibrahim al-Asiri	
	15	38	Badr Al Oufi Al Harbi	
	43	39	Abdullah Abdul-Rahman Al Harbi	
		52	Hussein Abdu Mohamed	
			Abdulmohsin Al-Sharikh	The Saudi Gazette reports he is the brother to two former Guantanamo captives -- Abdulhadi Al-Sharikh and Abdulrazzaq Al-Sharikh.
			Abdullah Al-Juwair	The Saudi Gazette reports he is the brother to Fahd Al-Juwair who was killed in a shootout with Saudi security officials, following an attempt to blow up a petroleum facility. His brother Fahd was listed on and earlier most wanted list.
	6		Ahmad Al-Shiha	Was studying Shariah law at University, when he disappeared.
		31	Aqil Al-Mutairi	Disappeared unexpectedly three years ago—believed to have gone to Iraq.
	60	27	Faiz Al-Harbi	Disappeared five months ago—had recently told his mother he was thinking of seeking an Islamic education outside of Saudi Arabia—but he hadn't said where.; Also transliterated as Fayez Ghuneim Hameed Al-Hijri Al-Harbi.
			Qasim al-Raymi	One of the two Yemenis on the list.; Alleged to be linked to: "a plot targeting the U.S. ambassador in San'a."
			Obaida Abdul-Rahman Al Otaibi	A journalist with Saudi Al-Jazirah; Attended Imam Mohamed Bin Saud University where he earned a degree in media; Attended the same high school as "Eisa Al-Awsham, a former Al Qaeda commander."; Accused of "planning to target vital infrastructure within Saudi Arabia."
	32		Sultan Radi al-Utaibi	His family reports that he was killed fighting Americans in Baghdad in January 2007.; The Saudi Interior Ministry assert DNA tests confirm he was killed in a skirmish with Yemeni security officials, on September 14, 2009.
	47		Abdullah Mohammed Abdullah al-Ayad	He was profiled as a deceased martyr in a propaganda video in 2008.
			Ahmed Owaidan Al-Harbi	Reportedly captured in Yemen in early 2009, described as "wanted" by Saudi security officials.
	73		Mohammed Otaik Owaid Al-Aufi Al-Harbi	
	26		Khaled Saleem Owaid Al-Luhaibi Al-Harbi	
		34	Abdullah Thabet	Alleged to hold Osama bin Laden as a hero.; Alleged to have entered "clandestine cells" that launched raids against "non-believers".; Alleged to have written a novel entitled "The 20th hijacker" about his jihadist years.
	61	31	Fahd Raggad Samir Al-Ruwaili	On March 26, 2009, Al-Arabiya television reported he surrendered to Saudi authorities.; ABC News transliterates his name as "Fahad al-Ruwaily", and reports: "A news Web site close to the ministry said Thursday that al-Ruwaily was a key figure in al-Qaida training camps along Syria's border with Iraq."
			Badr Mohammed Nasser al-Shihri	Al-Shihri's surrender was reported on October 19, 2010.; Al-Shihri was reported to have surrendered when he was living in Pakistan.; The Associated Press reported that Saudi officials allowed al-Shihri to be released into the custody of his family, following his repatriation.

== List of January 2011 ==
December 6, 2003 list

According to the Saudi Gazette, the list was published by Interpol on January 5, 2011. They reported one of the wanted men was 18, 34 of the men were between 20 and 30, and the remaining 12 were between 30 and 40. The list of 47 suspects included the following individuals:

English	Arabic	Nationality	Age	Notes
1. Ahmad Abdul Aziz Jassir Al-Jassir	أحمد عبد العزيز جاسر آل جاسر			
2. Ahmad Muhammada Abdul Aziz Al-Suwaid	أحمد محمد عبدالعزيز السويد	Saudi		
3. Anas Ali Abdul Aziz Al-Nashwan	أنس علي عبد العزيز آل نشوان	Saudi		
4. Basim Salim Inad Al-Subail		Saudi		
5. Basim Muhammad Hamid Al-Fazzi Al-Juhani	باسم محمد حامد الفزي الجهني	Saudi		
6. Bassam Ibrahim Yahya Al-Sulaimani	بسام إبراهيم يحيى السليماني	Saudi		
7. Bandar Mushil Shai'an Al-Shaibani Al-Otaibi	بندر مسحل شيعان الشيباني العتيبي			
8. Turki Sa'ad Muhammad Qulais Al-Shahrani	تركي سعد محمد قليص الشهراني	Saudi		
9. Turki Hadi Sa'ad Al-Atifi Al-Qahtani	تركي هادي سعد العاطفي القحطاني	Saudi		
10. Hussein Saleh Dhafir Aal Bahri	حسين صالح ظافر آل بحري	Saudi		
11. Hamza Muhammad Hassan Uraishi		Saudi		
12. Khalid Ali Abdul Rahman Al-Jubaili Al-Qahtani	خالد علي عبد الرحمن الجبيلي القحطاني	Saudi		
13. Khalid Hadhal Abdullah Al-Atifi Al-Qahtani	خالد هذال عبدالله العاطفي القحطاني	Saudi		Surrendered
14. Za'am Saeed Farhan Al-Shaibani Al-Otaibi	زعام سعيد فرحان الشيباني العتيبي	Saudi		
15. Sa'ad Qa'ed Muq'id Al-Maqqati	سعد قاعد مقعد المقاطي	Saudi		
16. Solaiman Ahmad Turaikhim Al-Hamdan	سليمان أحمد طريخم الحمدان	Saudi		
17. Saleh Abdul Aziz Hamad Al-Luhaib	صالح عبدالعزيز حمد اللهيب	Saudi		
18. Adil Radhi Saqr Al-Wahabi Al-Harbi	عادل راضي صقر الوهابي الحربي	Saudi		US$5,000,000 reward
19. Adil Salhe Ahmad Al-Qumaishi	عادل صالح أحمد القميشي	Saudi		
20. Abdul Rahman Abdul Aziz Rashid Al-Farraj	عبد الرحمن عبد العزيز راشد آل فراج	Saudi		
21. Abdul Majeed Faisal Muhammad Al-Jubairi Al-Shehri	عبد المجيد فيصل محمد الجبيري الشهاري	Saudi		
22. Amr Solaiman Ali Al-Ali	عمرو سليمان علي العلي	Saudi		
23. Fahd Awaiyedh Mu'tiq Al-Ma'badi		Saudi		
24. Fawwaz Ayedh Jaman Al-Masoudi Al-Otaibi	فواز عايض جمعان المسعودي العتيبي	Saudi		
25. Fawwaz Awaiyedh Mu'tiq Al-Ma-badi		Saudi		
26. Faisal Mu'tad Muqbil Al-Muraikhan Al-Harbi				
27. Mu'tib Hamad Muhammad Al-Juraiwi		Saudi		
28. Mu'tib Saeed Humammad Al-Amri		Saudi		
29. Muhammad Saleem Saeed Buraikan	أنس علي عبدالعزيز النشوان	Saudi		
30. Muhammad Farhan Salman Al-Maliki	محمد فرحان سلمان المالكي	Saudi		
31. Nuhammad Mufrih Muhammad Al-Adwani Al-Zahrani		Saudi		
32. Mu'jib Muhammad Jamal Al-Qahtani		Saudi		
33. Hashim Muhammad Ibrahim Al-Hindi	هاشم محمد إبراهيم الهندي	Saudi		
34. Waleed Jarbou' Edi Al-Julaidi Al-Harbi		Saudi		
35. Waleed Humayeed Hameed Al-Waladi		Saudi		
36. Yasser Dahheel Nafi' Al-Wahabi Al-Harbi		Saudi		

== Suspects who remain at large, or otherwise unaccounted for ==
According to the Agence France Presse, the SPA News Agency reported on May 23, 2009, that three Saudis suspected of ties to Al Qaida returned to Saudi Arabia and turned themselves in to authorities. The Arab News reported the identities of the three men were not made public, but that they had not been listed on the February 2009 most-wanted list. The Saudi Gazette reported that only two of the men voluntarily surrendered and that the third man was captured in Yemen.

On October 19, 2010, when reporting the surrender of Jabir Jubran Al Fayfi and Badr Mohammed Nasser al-Shihri, the Associated Press asserted that 70 of the original 85 men named on the list remained at large or unaccounted for.
