= Mohamed Abul-Khair =

Suspected terrorist (1975–2010)

Muhammad Abdallah Hasan Abu-al-Khayr
- Born: June 18 or 19, 1975; Medina, Saudi Arabia
- Died: September 18, 2010 (aged 35); Pakistan
- Other names: Abu Abdallah al-Halabi
- Known for: An Osama bin Laden bodyguard, Osama bin Laden's son-in-law, an al Qaeda financial official

Muhammad Abdallah Hasan Abu-al-Khayr (18 or 19 June 1975 – 18 September 2010), also known as Abu Abdallah al-Halabi, was a citizen of Saudi Arabia notable for being named on its 2009 list of most wanted suspected terrorists. He was alleged to be one of Osama bin Laden's bodyguards, and one of his sons-in-law.

== Background ==
According to Asharq Alawsat Mohamed Abu-al-Khayr had "established ties with 9/11 hijacker Ramzi Bin al-Shaiba". They report he: "is currently believed to be in the Iranian-Afghan-Pakistani triangle."

On August 24, 2010, the Long War Journal reported that both the United States and United Nations had entered "Muhammad Abdallah Hasan Abu al Khayr" on their lists of terrorist suspects whose financial assets should be frozen, world-wide. The Long War Journal describes him as "a top financial official in the terror organization." The United Nations 1267 list was established by United Nations Security Council Resolution 1267, in 1999, but is regularly updated, with new individuals being added as needed, and with defectors, or individuals known to have died being removed. The United States list was established by United States President George W. Bush's Presidential Executive Order 13224.

The Long War Journal noted the Treasury called Abu-al-Khayr "a key leader of the terrorist organization's finance section" who "also acts for al Qaeda in a leadership role on the media committee."

On July 29, 2011, a poster on an al-Qaeda-linked forum claimed that Abu al-Khayr was killed on an unspecified date. A letter retrieved from the compound where Bin Laden was killed in Abbottabad, Pakistan confirmed that Abu-al-Khayr was killed in a drone strike in Pakistan on September 18, 2010.
