= Ali Abd al-Rahman al-Faqasi al-Ghamdi =

Saudi Arabian al-Qaeda member

Ali Abd al-Rahman al-Faqasi al-Ghamdi, reported to have been the second in command of al Qaeda in Saudi Arabia in 2003, prior to his June 26, 2003 surrender.

Ali Abd al-Rahman al-Faqasi al-Ghamdi (Arabic: علي عبدالرحمن الفقعسي الغامدي, ʿAlī ʿAbd ar-Raḥmān al-Faqʿsī al-Ghāmdī; born 1973) is a citizen of Saudi Arabia who has been identified as a member of Al-Qaeda in Saudi Arabia. BBC News reported his name was "Ali Abdul Rahman al-Ghamdi", while CNN reported his name was "Ali Abd al-Rahman al-Faqasi al-Ghamdi". They report Saudi Arabia had named him on a list of most wanted Saudi terrorism suspects. There are three individuals named some variation of al Ghamdi on the Saudi most wanted list: Ali A. Al-Ghamdi, Hani S. Al-Ghamdi and Bandar A. Al-Ghamdi.

According to BBC News, Ali Abd al-Rahman al-Faqasi al-Ghamdi surrendered on June 26, 2003, shortly after he had been listed as the second most senior wanted individual on the first Saudi most wanted list. They reported US officials asserted that he had been present in Afghanistan in late 2001, and that he had been present at the battle of Tora Bora. They reported US officials also asserted he had been an associate of senior al Qaeda leaders Saif al-Adel, Abu Mohammed al-Masri and Khalid Sheikh Mohammed.

Al-Ghamdi is one of the 20th hijacker suspects in the September 11 attacks.

He is reported to have played a role in organizing the May 2003 Riyadh compound bombings.
