= Othman Hadi Al Maqboul al-Amri =

Citizen of Saudi Arabia (born 1969)

- Born: 1969 (age 56–57)
- Other name: عثمان هادي آل مقبول العمري
- Known for: suspected terrorist

Othman Hadi Al Maqboul al-Amri (عثمان هادي آل مقبول العمري) is a citizen of Saudi Arabia who Saudi Security officials suspected of ties to terrorism. He was one of 26 suspects they placed on their Saudi list of most wanted suspected terrorists in December 2003. He surrendered on June 28, 2004, the second suspect to surrender, after King Fahd offered a partial amnesty. He surrendered in Halba bani Amr.

Brian Whitaker of The Guardian called him the first important surrender in response to the amnesty. Whitaker speculated that al-Amri may have played a "logistics role" not an active role, in militancy.

The partial amnesty does not spare him a trial, or detention, if convicted, but it does spare him a death sentence. According to Al Bawaba Safar Al-Hawali played a mediation role in negotiating al Amri's surrender. Al-Hawali said that he expected Saudi Arabia's Interior Minister Muhammad ibn Naif to call al Amri to meet him. When he was captured al Amri said ""I surrendered of my own free will, having trusted the words of Crown Prince Abdullah." He called on other suspects to follow his example and surrender.

Al-Amri is from al-Namas Province. He has been married twice, and has five children. He served as a Sergeant in the Saudi army. His family says he fell under suspicion when he disappeared in December 2002. There was press speculation that al-Amri may have travelled to Iraq, after the US invasion.

Brian Whitaker, of The Guardian quoted from an interview al-Amri gave for documentary broadcast on Saudi TV, about al Haer prison, in December 2004. Al-Amri said about the prison officials, "I swear to God, they are nicer than our parents."
