= Adnan Al-Sayegh =

Iraqi poet

Adnan al-Sayegh
- Born: 1955 (age 70–71)
- Occupation: Poet

Adnan al-Sayegh (born 1955 in Al-Kufa, Iraq), "is one of the most original voices from the generation of Iraqi poets known as the Eighties Movement. His poetry, crafted with elegance, and sharp as an arrowhead, carries an intense passion for freedom love and beauty. Adnan uses his words as a weapon to denounce the devastation of war and the horrors of dictatorship."

In 1993, his criticism of oppression and injustice led to his exile in Jordan and Lebanon. After being sentenced to death in Iraq in 1996, because of the publication of "Uruk's Anthem," a long poem in which he gives voice to the profound despair of the Iraqi experience, he took refuge in Sweden. Since 2004, he has resided in London.

In the spring of 2006, Adnan al-Sayegh read his poems at the third Al-Marbed Poetry Festival in Basra,Iraq. The poems upset the intolerant armed militia and al-Sayegh was threatened with death and with having his tongue cut out. He was forced to leave Basra in haste and through Kuwait to return to his exile in London.

Adnan is a member of the Iraqi and Arab Writers Unions, the Iraqi and Arab Journalists Unions, the International Journalist Organization, the Swedish Writers Union and the Swedish Pen Club.

He has received several international awards; among them, the Hellman-Hammet International Poetry Award (New York, 1996), the Rotterdam International Poetry Award (1997) and the Swedish Writers Association Award (2005), and has been invited to read his poems in many festivals across the world.

His poems have been translated into English, Swedish, Spanish, French, German, Romanian, Norwegian, Danish, Dutch, Persian and Kurdish.

The following collections of Adnan's poetry have been published:

- Wait for me under the Statue of Liberty (Baghdad, 1984)
- Songs on the Bridge of Kufa (Baghdad, 1986)
- Sparrows don't Love Bullets (Baghdad, 1986)
- Sky in a Helmet (Baghdad, 1988)
- Mirrors for her Long Hair (Baghdad, 1992)
- Cloud of Glue (Baghdad, 1993)
- Under a Strange Sky (London, 1994)
- Formations (Beirut and Amman, 1996)
- Uruk's Anthem (Beirut, 1996)
- Carrying an Exile (Sweden, 2001)

An M.A. thesis on his work – The Poetry of Adnan al-Sayegh, a Technical Study – submitted to the Department of Modern Languages (University of Baghdad) by the Iraqi scholar and poet Arif al-Sa'adi, has been published (Sweden, 2007).
