= Al-Harth =

Al-Harth الحرث
- Sub-district
- Location in Yemen
- Coordinates: 14°01′22″N 44°15′15″E
- Country: Yemen
- Governorate: Ibb Governorate
- District: Ba'dan District

Population (2004)
  - Total: 20,039
- Time zone: UTC+3

Al-Harth (Arabic: الحرث) is a sub-district located in Ba'dan District, Ibb Governorate, Yemen. Al-Harth had a population of 20039 as of 2004.
