= Hakim Almasmari =

Yemeni-American writer

Hakim Almasmari is a Yemeni American who is the publisher and editor in chief of the Yemen Post newspaper, which he founded in 2007. Due to his close ties with factions in Yemen, he played a role as a mediator for political deals in Yemen, including the 2009 Saudi war with Houthis. He is a university lecturer in the field of international media and also studied business and law. Over the last 20 years, his work on Yemen has appeared in the front pages of newspapers such as The Wall Street Journal, Washington Post, The Guardian, The National, and USA Today, among others. Almasmari was born and raised in Michigan, United States. For over a decade, he reported for CNN and was a contributor titled “Yemen Expert” to Al Jazeera.
