= Nasir al-Wuhayshi =

Yemeni al-Qaeda member (1976–2015)

- ناصر الوحيشي
- Wuhayshi in 2012

1st Emir of al-Qaeda in the Arabian Peninsula
- In office 20 January 2009 – 12 June 2015
- Preceded by: Position established
- Succeeded by: Qasim al-Raymi

3rd Emir of al-Qaeda in Yemen
- In office 3 February 2006 – 20 January 2009
- Preceded by: Mohammed al-Ahdal
- Succeeded by: Position abolished

Personal details
- Born: 1 October 1976 Mukayras, Abyan Governorate (present-day al-Bayda Governorate), Yemen
- Died: 12 June 2015 (aged 38) Mukalla, Hadhramaut Governorate, Yemen
- Cause of death: Drone strike
- Nickname: Abu Basir

Military service
- Allegiance: Al-Qaeda
- Battles/wars: War in Afghanistan; Battle of Tora Bora; Al-Qaeda insurgency in Yemen; Battle of Zinjibar; Yemeni civil war; Battle of Mukalla

Nasir Abdel Karim al-Wuhayshi (Arabic: نَاصِرْ عَبْدُ ٱلْكَرِيمِ ٱلْوُحَيْشِيّ Nāṣir ʿAbdu l-Karīm il-Wuḥayšiyy; also transliterated as Naser al-Wahishi, Nasser al-Wuhayshi) alias Abu Basir, (1 October 1976 – 12 June 2015) was a Yemeni Islamist, who served as the leader of al-Qaeda in the Arabian Peninsula (AQAP). Both Saudi Arabia and Yemen considered al-Wuhayshi to be among their most wanted fugitives. In October 2014, the US State Department increased the reward for any information leading to the capture or killing of al-Wuhayshi to US$10 million, the same as ISIS leader Abu Bakr al-Baghdadi. Wuhayshi was killed in a US drone strike in Haḍramawt Governorate of Yemen on 12 June 2015.

== Early life ==
Nasir al-Wuhayshi was born on 1 October 1976 in the Mukayras region of what was then the Abyan Governorate of South Yemen but is now al-Bayda Governorate. Little is known about his early life in Abyan, though various Yemeni journalists state that he came from an ordinary family. He studied at a private religious institute in Yemen before graduating in 1998, and moved to Afghanistan in the months after Osama bin Laden's fatwa declaring war on the United States and Israel.

== Militancy career ==
=== 1998–2003: Afghanistan and Osama bin Laden's secretary ===
Wuhayshi joined al-Qaeda in 1998 and was made Bin Laden's personal secretary. He was described as being "nearly inseparable" from Bin Laden while he listened to his counsels and acted as correspondence for him. Gregory D. Johnsen described him as being "groomed by Osama bin Laden to take on a leadership role." Along with lessons and conversations with Bin Laden, he also attended the al-Farouq training camp. Nasser al-Bahri, Bin Laden's former bodyguard, claims that Wuhayshi was selected to be in charge of the Tarnak Farms training camp, where he regularly saw Bin Laden and spent his mornings with him at his office in the compound where he planned attacks including the 1998 US embassy bombings and the September 11 attacks. Wuhayshi has been said to have modeled himself and his demeanour based on Bin Laden.

Wuhayshi stuck alongside Bin Laden during the US-led invasion of Afghanistan. A journalist recalls a story told to him by AQAP fighters where "during bombing raids, everyone else would scatter, but he [Wuhayshi] would stay by Bin Laden's side". Wuhayshi was among the few al-Qaeda members chosen by Bin Laden to accompany him during his escape to the Tora Bora cave complex. He fought at the Battle of Tora Bora until Bin Laden escaped to Pakistan and he was separated from the rest of al-Qaeda as the group scattered. After the fall of the Taliban emirate, Wuhayshi fled to Iran, where he was subsequently arrested by authorities.

=== 2006–2009: Al-Qaeda in Yemen ===
Wuhayshi was extradited from Iran to Yemen in 2003, and was held for years without charge. Yemeni authorities, reportedly unaware of his close connections to Bin Laden, held Wuhayshi in the general prison population of a maximum-security prison in Sanaa, where he became a spiritual leader among his fellow militant inmates. On 3 February 2006, Wuhayshi was among the group of 23 al-Qaeda suspects who escaped from the prison by digging a tunnel to the women's bathroom of a nearby mosque. Alongside fellow escapee Qasim al-Raymi, Wuhayshi worked to rebuild al-Qaeda in Yemen throughout the following years, utilizing their past experience as al-Qaeda members and connections with veteran militants such as Jamal al-Badawi, a USS Cole bombing plotter who escaped alongside them.

Much of Wuhayshi's reputation among the "second generation" of jihadists in Yemen and al-Qaeda in general came from his association with Bin Laden. Wuhayshi "used Bin Laden’s blueprint from Afghanistan", according to an analyst, in order to rebuild the group in a manner which would allow it to withstand the loss of key leaders, which had previously led to its destruction in 2002 after the killing of Abu Ali al-Harithi, and maintain popular support. To do this, he sought to avoid the mistakes which led to the downfall of other al-Qaeda affiliates in Iraq and Saudi Arabia by limiting Muslim civilian casualties in attacks and providing clear rationales for what the group considered legitimate targets.

AQY launched its first attack since regroup, a double-suicide car bombing on two oil facilities, on 15 September 2006. On 21 June 2007, Wuhayshi was officially appointed the leader of AQY in a statement posted by the group online. On 2 July 2007, AQY directed a suicide car bombing on a Spanish tourist convoy in Marib, killing eight. Wuhayshi along with Raymi were accused of masterminding both attacks, and were sentenced in absentia to 15 years in prison for their role in them. Wuhayshi personally authorized the creation of Sada al-Malahem, AQY's jihadist e-magazine, and gave his permission to Nayif Muhammad al-Qahtani for him to produce it. The group renamed itself to al-Qaeda in the Southern Arabian Peninsula (AQSAP) in the second issue of Sada al-Malahem released on 13 March 2008, in which Wuhayshi wrote "Jihad is a religious duty that God has made incumbent." On 17 September 2008, AQSAP launched an attack on the US embassy in Sanaa, killing 16 in what was labeled the group's most sophisticated attack in years. In November 2008, al-Qaeda deputy leader Ayman al-Zawahiri publicly recognized Wuhayshi as the leader of al-Qaeda in the region.

=== 2009–2015: Al-Qaeda in the Arabian Peninsula ===
In January 2009, the al-Qaeda branches in Yemen and Saudi Arabia merged and formed al-Qaeda in the Arabian Peninsula (AQAP). Ayman Al-Zawahiri confirmed al-Wuhayshi's appointment as leader of AQAP in a video posted online.

Nasir al-Wuhayshi and three other men appeared in several threatening videos released in January 2009. Al Wuhayshi published an additional video calling for violence in February. He claimed the increase in western warships off the Horn of Africa to fight piracy were really intended to oppress Islam. On 10 May 2011, AQAP published a eulogy written by Wuhayshi for Bin Laden more than a week after his killing, in which he vowed more attacks against the US. According to Yemeni military officials he was killed in southern Yemen on 28 August 2011. On 25 October 2011, AQAP denied that he was killed.

On 6 December, al-Wuhayshi released a statement on jihadist websites that AQAP would be intervening in the Siege of Dammaj on the side of Salafi students fighting the Shi'a Houthi militia. A member of a local tribe reported on 22 December that Abdel al-Wuhashi, a younger brother of Nasir, was killed by Yemeni military forces.

In 2013, Al-Qaeda Emir Ayman al-Zawahiri appointed al-Wuhayshi as his deputy, speculating that he may be the next Emir of Al-Qaeda.

In March 2014, al-Wuhayshi made an appearance in a video celebrating the mass jailbreak of fighters held in Yemeni prisons. Around 400 AQAP fighters were present in what was described as being the largest known gathering of al-Qaeda in Yemen. In the video, al-Wuhayshi declared, "We have to remove the Cross, and the bearer of the Cross, America."

== Death ==
Al-Wuhayshi was killed in a US drone strike in Yemen on 12 June 2015. AQAP released a statement acknowledging his death several days later and announced Qasim al-Raymi as his successor.
