= Care Rehabilitation Center =

Facility in Saudi Arabia

The Care Rehabilitation Center is a facility in Saudi Arabia intended to re-integrate former jihadists into the mainstream of Saudi culture. The center is located in a former resort complex, complete with swimming pools, and other recreational facilities.

The Mohammed bin Nayef Counseling and Care Center is based in Riyadh. Saudi Prince Muhammad bin Nayef bin Abdul Aziz Al-Saud, son of a deputy prime minister, and a deputy minister for security, had played a role in setting up the program in 2007 after a series of terrorist attacks including bombings and kidnapping.

== Program goals ==
Suspected terrorists currently enrolled in the program have either been caught by the Saudi security forces, surrendered themselves or are Guantanamo detainees. In June 2017, Mohammed bin Salman took over the leadership of the program. Detainees spend up to 6 months at the center, however if there are no clear signs of reform after 3 months, they are sent back to prison and answer to the judicial system. Guantanamo detainees undergo a specific program that lasts around 18 months due to the psychological trauma they experienced and the fact that they may represent a security threat.

Determining whether former extremists are suitable for release is the responsibility of the Saudi Ministry of Interior and its security forces personnel. A condition of release is placing former detainees under a monitoring system similar to parole or probation. Many released detainees remain under constant surveillance.

== Rehabilitation program ==
The core of the program is to return extremists to the "true Islam." The program employs intensive religious instruction by deconstructing extremists’ interpretation of the Holy Qur'an. Following rigorous debate, Islamic scholars and clerics, many employed by Saudi Arabia's universities, establish a foundation for different interpretation that brings extremists back in line to the true meaning of Islam. Saudi Arabia's rehabilitation program is modeled after a similar program implemented in Egypt in the 1990s. Indonesia and Singapore, in turn, established rehabilitation programs based on the Saudi Arabian model. Program discussions focus on jihad (military and personal struggles), takfir (unbelievers), bay’at (allegiance) and walaah (loyalty to the Muslim community).

== Program results ==
As of 2017, the program claimed to have treated over 3,300 men convicted of terrorism-related crimes with an 86% success rate. This success rate is measured by the number of men who did not return to jihad for at least 10 years after graduating from the center's program.

In its initial years the program was described as successful. Commentators suggested other countries, like Yemen, should run similar rehabilitation programs. One of the first graduates of the program, Khalid Al Hubayshi, continues to be cited as the model of a successful graduate of the program.

British Prime Minister Gordon Brown toured the facility on November 2, 2008, and spoke with several former Guantananmo captives. Brown is reported to have spoken with Ghanim Abdul Rahman Al Harbi and Juma al Dossari.

The Saudis had claimed 100% success rate until 2009. Yusef Abdullah Saleh Al Rabiesh, a former Guantanamo captive who went through the rehabilitation program, went on record to express his gratitude to the prince, and to warn his countrymen against being influenced by extremists.

On February 4, 2009, the Associated Press reported that Saudi authorities had listed eleven former Guantanamo captives who attended the Rehabilitation Center on a list of 85 most wanted terrorist suspects.

In June 2010, the Saudi Ministry of Interior determined that 25 of the 120 former Guantanamo Bay detainees who graduated the rehabilitation program returned to terrorist activities. 11 of the 25 joined Al-Qaeda in the Arabian Peninsula in Yemen. However, the overall recidivism rate of more than 3,000 program graduates as of 2010 remains about 10 percent. Al-Qaeda had previously announced plans to target a key component of the program, which allows fugitive extremists to voluntarily surrender and become eligible for the program. Al-Qaeda's announcement was intended to challenge Saudi Arabia's official interpretation of Islam by attempting to draw wavering extremists who desire to give up terrorism back into the embrace of Al-Qaeda.

== Known issues ==
According to Peter Taylor, the BBC found that the cohort of Saudis repatriated in November 2007 problematic. Taylor called this cohort batch 10, and reported that many of these captives were not rehabilitated. Some of these captives arrived before the rehabilitation center was opened.

In January 2009, two former Guantanamo captives released a threatening video online. Following the release of the video Saudi authorities took nine other former captives back into custody. The names of the nine re-apprehended men have not been made public.

In late August Abdullah Hassan Tali' al-Asiri, a suspected jihadist, who had been named on the February 2009 Saudi most wanted list, said he wanted to meet the prince when he surrendered, turned out to be a suicide bomber. Some security officials were injured, but the prince escaped serious injury, and Al-Asiri was the only fatality.

On November 29, 2016, citing the transcript from his Periodic Review Board, Fox News reported, Ghassan Abdullah Al-Sharbi asserted, staff members at the centre had a “hidden radicalisation programme”. However, neither Fox or the other sites that repeated this report, explained why they thought Al-Sharbi could offer inside information about the operation of the rehabilitation program, when he was still in Guantanamo.
