= Designated Senior Official =

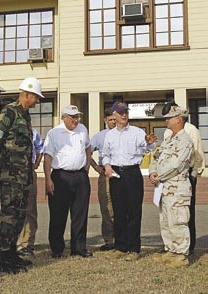
Designated Civilian Official Gordon R. England and Senator Carl Levin tour Guantanamo.

The Designated Senior Official (DSO), also referred to as the Senior Designated Official (SDO) or Designated Civilian Official (DCO), is an additional duty or responsibility assigned to officials within governments. The designation, often mandated in legislation, requires the official to take a direct role in a priority initiative, program, or project, ensuring that sufficient importance, support and oversight is provided.

The terminology, level of seniority, and reporting requirements varies depending on the context, the legislation, and the agency or department the individual represents.

== Notable Examples of Designated Civilian Officials ==
=== Office for the Administrative Review of Detained Enemy Combatants ===
Gordon R. England, whose primary job was then to serve as United States Secretary of the Navy, was appointed to as the first Designated Civilian Official for the Office for the Administrative Review of Detained Enemy Combatants (OARDEC). The selection and appointment of a DCO for OARDEC was in accordance with the Graham-Levin Amendment of the Detainee Treatment Act of 2005. The DCO position and OARDEC were officially created on June 23, 2004. Gordon R. England served as the OARDEC DCO from June 2004, until President Barack Obama replaced OARDEC with a multi-agency Guantanamo Review Joint Task Force.

During the June 23, 2004 press conference where he described his new position, England was asked about how he would handle the additional responsibilities of this position, and how independent he would be. He repeated that his decisions would not be influenced by the Secretary of Defense, or other more senior officials. England said human rights groups, like the International Committee of the Red Cross, and other agencies of the United States Government, had been consulted in as the Review process was being designed.

The Center for Constitution Rights published an analysis of the DCO's role on May 19, 2004. "The entire review procedure is inadequate and illegal," stated Rachel Meeropol, an attorney at CCR. According to Michael Ratner:

...The DCO can order continued detention based on his or her opinion that the detainee 'remains a threat to the United States' or 'if there is any other reason that it is in the interest of the United States and its allies' for the detainee to remain in detention'.

=== Senior Civilian Official for Civilian Casualty Policy ===
David Trachtenburg, whose primary job was then to serve as Deputy Under Secretary of Defense for Policy, was designated as the Senior Civilian Official for Civilian Casualty Policy.

The selection and appointment of a DCO for Civilian Casualty Policy was in accordance with Section 936 of the 2019 National Defense Authorization Act, Responsibility For Policy On Civilian Casualty Matters. The duties of the position, according to the legislation, require the DCO to "develop, coordinate, and oversee compliance with the policy of the Department relating to civilian casualties resulting from United States military operations." While the legislation required the designation of an official at the assistant secretary of defense level or higher, the designation of Mr. Trachtenburg by Department of Defense means that the position is filled by an official at a more senior level than required.

=== Senior Designated Official for the Electromagnetic Spectrum Operations Cross Functional Team ===
John E. Hyten, the Vice Chairman of the Joint Chiefs of Staff, was assigned as the Senior Designated Official for the Electromagnetic Spectrum Operations Cross Functional Team (EMSO CFT). The appointment, pursuant to Section 1053 of the FY19 NDAA, requires the Vice Chairman to "oversee the cross-functional team...and serve as an ex-officio member of the Electronic Warfare Executive Committee." The EMSO CFT, one of four Secretary of Defense-Empowered Cross-Functional Teams, was directed to "take bold action across the Department [of Defense] to regain US dominance in the Electromagnetic Spectrum."

== Other Examples ==
=== Canada ===
The Canadian government uses Senior Designated Officials for the management of projects and programmes. The Treasury Board of Canada Secretariat, in its Directive on the Management of Projects and Programmes lists the requirements and responsibilities for SDO within the secretariat.
