= Yemen Post (newspaper) =

- Type: Daily newspaper
- Editor-in-chief: Hakim Almasmari
- Website: http://yemenpost.net

The Yemen Post was a newspaper in Yemen published from 2007 and now defunct. It was also Yemen's first hourly updated online news service with reporters spread throughout the country. The Yemen Post hard copy version was distributed mostly in Yemen and was first launched in a newspaper format on 2 November 2007. The newspaper is distributed to over 2000 government institutions, embassies, organizations, businesses throughout Yemen. Along with the foreign distribution to neighboring countries, the Yemen Post is also distributed to some communities within Europe and the United States. The format of the newspaper was changed to a full-colored, top of the art tabloid format on 16 February 2009. The paper was founded by the current publisher and editor in chief, Hakim Almasmari.

The Yemen Post website faced technical issues caused by hackers in 2015. It was then blocked by authorities in Yemen in 2017 for its reporting. The newspaper editor in chief received threats numerous times for the newspapers coverage and when options were limited to remain independent, he preferred to stop publishing until the media landscape improves in Yemen. When its website was blocked, it relocated to Twitter and its account was last active in 2019.

== See also ==
- List of newspapers in Yemen
