= Saudi Gazette =

English-language Saudi news publication

- Saudi Gazette cover (17 April 2017)
- Type: Daily newspaper
- Format: Online
- Publisher: Okaz Organization for Press and Publication
- Editor-in-chief: Jameel Altheyabi
- Founded: 1976
- Political alignment: Liberal
- Language: English
- Headquarters: Jeddah
- Sister newspapers: Okaz
- ISSN: 1319-0326
- OCLC number: 5284599
- Website: Saudi Gazette

Saudi Gazette is an English-language daily newspaper launched in 1976 and published in Jeddah, Saudi Arabia. It is only available online, as the print version was discontinued in 2019. It is the second English-language daily newspaper in Saudi Arabia.

Published by Okaz Organization for Press and Publication, Saudi Gazette is pro-government.

== See also ==
- List of newspapers in Saudi Arabia
