= List of terrorist incidents in Saudi Arabia =

== 1960s ==
The most serious violence to take place was a series of bomb blasts in Riyadh in late 1966 and early 1967. The bombings, which caused no known casualties, were claimed by the North Yemen-based Nasserite organisation Union of the People of the Arabian Peninsula [ittihad sha'b al-jazira al-'arabiyya] (UPAP). After the attacks, Saudi authorities arrested several hundred Yemenis, executed 17 of them and expelled the rest.

== 1979 ==
20 November – 4 December (See Grand Mosque Seizure) – number of militants took over the Masjid al-Haram in Mecca to protest the House of Saud's policies of Westernization. The militants were well organized and armed and were initially able to repel attempts by the Saudi National Guard to storm the complex. The Saudis eventually brought in French and Pakistani commandos to help their forces retake the Mosque. Non-Muslim commandos underwent nominal conversion to Islam before being allowed into the Mosque. Eventually the Mosque was retaken and the 63 or 67 surviving male militants were executed. The number of people killed in the siege and the total number of militants involved are disputed. Official sources put the death toll at 255, but others suggest that it was higher. Ruhollah Khomeini addressed on Radio regarding the seizure of the Mosque on 21 November.

== 1988 ==
30 September – four Shi'ite men are beheaded for blowing up fuel storage tanks at the Saudi Petrochemical Company (SADAF) facility in Jubail. They had entered the plant by cutting a hole in the perimeter fence. One tank happened to be empty, but another was full and burned for several days. Eventually the fire was extinguished when a firefighting team literally plugged the hole in the tank.

SADAF Engineer William (Bill) Parry (07.11.1941 - 18.12.2022) was the engineer responsible for the idea and design of the ‘plug’ that was used to stop the fire. He was also one of the volunteer firefighters who walked in to the fire to place it in position.

== 1995 ==
1 November – a car bomb killed five US citizens and two Indians at the offices of the Saudi National Guard in Riyadh.

== 1996 ==
25 June - (See Khobar Towers bombing) – the Khobar Towers apartment complex in Khobar, near Dhahran, is hit by a large truck bomb. Nineteen US airmen are killed and 372 wounded by the blast. William Perry, who was the United States Secretary of Defense at the time that this bombing happened, said in an interview in June 2007 that "he now believes al-Qaida rather than Iran was behind a 1996 truck bombing at an American military base."

== 2001 ==
In late 2001, a Sudanese man with links to Al-Qaeda fired an SA-7 at an American F-15 Eagle fighter taking off from Prince Sultan Air Base in Saudi Arabia. The missile missed the target and was not detected by the pilot or anyone at the base. Saudi police found the empty launcher in the desert in May 2002, and a suspect was arrested in Sudan a month later. He led police to a cache in the desert where a second missile was buried.

== 2002 ==
20 June - A British national was killed when a bomb placed under his car detonated in Al Nakheel.

29 September - A German national was killed by a car bomb in central Riyadh.

== 2003 ==
20 February - An American employee of BAE Systems was shot to death in his car in Riyadh.

12 May - (See Riyadh compound bombings) at least 35 are killed and over 200 wounded during simultaneous suicide attacks on 3 Western compounds in Riyadh. These included the Al Hambra compound which housed the British International School and the Vinnell Compound and one other. The number of fatalities was reported to be 35 however witnesses reported that the number was much higher. Western sources report that National Guard collusion was involved and there are rumors of large numbers of Western expats leaving the country.

31 May - Two police officers and a militant are killed.

14 June - Security forces raided a building in the Khalidiya neighborhood of Makkah. Two Saudi police officers and five suspects were killed in a shootout. Twelve suspects were arrested including two from Chad and one Egyptian.

28 July - Six militants – four Saudis and two Chadians – and two police officers were killed in a police raid on a farm outside of Al-Qasim. The four Saudis were identified as Ahmad Al-Dakheel, Kareem Olayyan Al-Ramthan Al-Harbi, Saud Aamir Suleiman Al-Qurashi, and Muhammad Ghazi Saleem Al-Harbi. The Chadians were Isa Kamal Yousuf Khater and Isa Saleh Ali Ahmed. Another Saudi wanted person, identified as Ibrahim ibn Abdullah Khalaf Al-Harbi, was arrested after he being injured.

23 September - Three militants and a police officer are killed in a gunfight at a Riyadh hospital.

20 October - Police raid hideout in Riyadh and capture a large supply of weapons.

3 November - Police surround militant hideout in Riyadh and kill two.

6 November - Two militants surrounded by the police in Riyadh blow themselves up.

8 November - A truck bomb explodes at an Arab housing compound in Riyadh, killing 17 and injuring 120.

8 December - An unnamed militant is killed at a Riyadh gas station.

== 2004 ==
19 January - Shootout in Al-Nassim District (Riyadh).

29 January - One unnamed gunman captured and five police officers killed in a shootout in the Al-Nassim District of Riyadh.

In April United States Embassy issues a travel advisory for the Kingdom and urges all US citizens to leave.

5 April - An unnamed militant is reported killed in a car chase in Riyadh.

12 April - A police officer and one militant are killed in a shootout in Riyadh. Rakan ibn Moshen Al-Seikhan and Nasser ibn Rashid Al-Rashid are wounded and escape. Both are reported dead on 4 July.

13 April - Four police officers are killed in two attacks by militants. Several car bombs are found and defused.

15 April - The United States orders all governmental dependents and nonessential personnel out of the kingdom as a security measure.

21 April - A suicide bomber detonates a car bomb in Riyadh at the gates of a building used as the headquarters of the traffic police and emergency services. Five people die and 148 are injured.

22 April - Three unnamed militants are killed by police in Jeddah in an incident in the Al-Fayha district.

1 May - (See: 2004 Yanbu attack) Seven people (two US citizens, two Britons, an Australian, a Canadian, and a Saudi) are killed in a rampage at the premises of a petroleum company in Yanbu by three brothers. All the attackers, dressed in military uniforms, are killed.

22 May - German chef Hermann Dengl is shot and killed at Jarir Bookstore in Riyadh.

29 May - (See: 2004 Khobar massacre) 22 are killed during an attack on the Oasis Compound in Al-Khobar. After a siege, the gunmen escape. 19 of those killed are foreigners.

6 June - Simon Cumbers, an Irish cameraman for the BBC, is killed and the reporter Frank Gardner very severely wounded by gunshots to his head in Riyadh.

8 June - Robert Jacobs, a US citizen working for Vinnel Corp., is killed at his villa in Riyadh.

13 June - One US expatriate Kenneth Scroggs is killed and another Paul Johnson working for Lockheed Martin is kidnapped at a fake police checkpoint in Riyadh. A car bomb is also discovered on this date.

18 June - US citizen Paul Johnson is beheaded in Riyadh. His body is found some time later. A few hours later security services kill five militants (Abdel Aziz al-Muqrin, Turki Al-Muteri, Ibrahim Al-Durayhim and two others). A dozen are reported captured.

23 June - Saudi government offers a thirty-day limited amnesty to "terrorists".

1 July - Abdullah ibn Ahmed Al-Rashoud is killed in shootout east of the capital. Bandar Al-Dakheel escapes. Two policemen (Bandar Al-Qahtani and Humoud Abdullah Al-Harbi) are killed.

4 July - The bodies of Moshen Al-Seikhan and Nasser ibn Rashid Al-Rashid are discovered. One had had his leg crudely amputated. Both seem to have been wounded in fights with the security services and died later.

13 July - Khaled al-Harbi, who is listed on the government's most-wanted list, surrenders in Iran, is flown to Saudi Arabia.

14 July - Ibrahim al-Harb surrenders himself in Syria.

20 July - Shootout in Riyadh. Eisa ibn Saad Al-Awshan (number 13 on the list of the 26 most-wanted militants) is killed. Saleh al-Oufi (#4), the head of Al-Qaeda in the kingdom escapes from the raid on the compound where he had been living with his extended family.

23 July - Amnesty offer expires. Six wanted people had turned themselves in.

4 August - Tony Christopher, an Irish expatriate, is shot and killed at his desk in Riyadh.

5 August - Faris al-Zahrani (#11 on the government's list of most-wanted) is captured in Abha without a fight.

30 August - An unnamed US government employee is shot at while leaving a bank in Jeddah. No injuries.

11 September - Two small bombs go off in Jeddah near the Saudi British and Saudi American Banks. Nobody is injured.

26 September - Laurent Barbot, a French employee of a defense electronics firm, is shot dead in his car in Jeddah. Five Chadians confessed to the crime in June 2005.

4 November' - Unnamed 'deviant' is arrested in a shoot-out at an Internet café in Buraidah, Qasim region. Two policemen are injured.

9 November - Shootout in Jeddah. On Al-Amal Al-Saleh Street, police capture four unnamed militants and seize eight AKs and hundreds of locally made bombs. No deaths are reported.

10 November - Government announces the interception of 44,000 rounds of ammunition being smuggled in from Yemen. One Saudi waiting for the shipment is arrested.

13 November - Five unnamed militants arrested in Riyadh and Zulfi. A number of machine guns and other weapons are captured. Nobody is hurt in the gunfight.

17 November - A police officer (Private Fahd Al-Olayan) is killed and eight are injured in a shootout in Unayzah, Qassim. Five persons of interest are detained. Computers, pipe bombs and SR38,000 are seized.

6 December - Invasion of U.S. Consulate in Jeddah: Five employees are killed as five Al-Qaeda militants attack outbuildings and the chancery building before Saudi forces retake the property. Four Saudi special forces were wounded, four hostages were killed and a further 10 wounded in the crossfire.

16 December - A call for kingdom-wide anti-government demonstrations by a London-based group fails.

29 December - Two suicide car bombs explode in Riyadh. One outside the Interior Ministry Complex, the other near the Special Emergency Force training center. A passerby is killed and some people are wounded. In a resulting gun battle, seven suspected militants are killed. Two (Sultan Al-Otabi and Faisal Al-Dakheel) were on the Kingdom's list of 26 Most Wanted.

== 2005 ==
13 March - Saudi security forces in Jeddah conduct an early-morning raid that kills one (Saed al-Youbi) labeled as a terrorist. One civilian was also killed; five policemen were wounded. Three other suspects were arrested. One was thought to be Ibrahim al-Youbi.

3 April - through 5 April Saudi security forces launch the major Ar Rass raids against a three-house compound, 320 kilometers south of the capital. Fifteen terrorists, including Saleh Al-Aufi, reportedly the Al-Qaeda leader for Saudi Arabia were killed along with Talib Saud Al-Talib, also on the list of the 26 most-wanted piersons. The gunfight lasted for most of two days and included the use of rocket-propelled grenades, machine guns and other heavy weapons. Students at a nearby girls' school were in danger from the fire and were evacuated by police who broke down the rear wall to their building.

7 April - Using information from the previous raid, security services killed Abdul Rahman Al-Yaziji, number four on the most-wanted list in a firefight in the Southern Industrial District of Riyadh. The newspapers report that only three men on the list of the 26 most-wanted are still at liberty. They are Saleh Al-Aufi, Talib Al-Talib and Abdullah.

22 April - A group of four insurgents dressed as women attempt to bluff their way past a security checkpoint near the holy city of Makkah. Women are forbidden to drive in Saudi Arabia. The police gave chase as the group fled in their car. They were surrounded in a hilly area near Umm Al-Joud southeast of the city. Two militants and two security officers were killed in the resulting shootout, an unknown number were wounded. The battle took place as the Western Region of Saudi Arabia was conducting its first-ever elections for local government councils.

9 May - Abdul Aziz ibn Rasheed Al-Inazi is arrested after a shoot-out in Riyadh. His is described in the press as a leader of the Religious Committee of the insurgency.

18 May - The United States Embassy issues a message that revokes the travel advisory for Saudi Arabia that had been in effect for a year.

16 June - Security services announce the arrest in Riyadh of five Chadians who were described as 'members of a deviant group.' The detainees, whose names were not given confessed to the murder of Laurent Barbot in September 2004 as well as a number of armed robberies.

19 June - Lt Colonel Mubarak Al-Sawat, a senior police commander in Makkah, was killed outside his home as he got in his car on his way to work. Newspapers report the killing may have been a botched kidnapping attempt.

21 June - The killers of Lt Colonel Mubarak Al-Sawat are killed by security forces after a long fire-fight on the Old Makkah Road in the Holy City. Mansour Al-Thubaity and Kamal Foudah, both Saudi nationals, were fired on while fleeing police in a car, took another car and finally were killed while hiding in a building in a residential area. Three policemen were injured, one of them seriously.

24 June - An internet site linked to Al-Qaeda in Iraq reports that Abdullah, one of the few persons on the list of 26 Saudis most wanted has been killed by a US bomb. If true, this would leave only two persons (Saleh Al-Aufi, the alleged leader of Al-Qaeda in Saudi Arabia, and Taleb Al-Taleb) on that list unaccounted for.

29 June - The security services issues two new lists of wanted persons. List A includes 15 names of persons suspected of terrorist affiliations and who are thought to be in the Kingdom. List B is of 21 names of persons suspected of terrorist affiliation, who are thought to be outside the Kingdom.

List A

(1) Younus Mohamed Al-Hiyari, 36, Moroccan. Killed 3 July 2005.
(2) Fahd Farraj Al-Juwair, 35, Saudi.
(3) Zaid Saad Al-Samary, 31, Saudi.
(4) Abdul Rahman Saleh Al-Miteb, 26, Saudi. (See entry for 28 December 2005)
(5) Saleh Mansour Al-Harbi, 22, Saudi.
(6) Sultan Saleh Al-Hasry, 26, Saudi.
(7) Mohamed Abdul Rahman Al-Suwailemi, 23, Saudi.
(8) Mohamed Saleh Al-Ghaith, 23, Saudi.
(9) Abdullah Abdul Aziz Al-Tuwaijeri, 21, Saudi.
(10) Mohamed Saeed Al-Amry, 25, Saudi. Captured 25 July 2005
(11) Ibrahim Abdullah Al-Motair, 21, Saudi.
(12) Walid Mutlaq Al-Radadi, 21, Saudi.
(13) Naif Farhan Al-Shammary, 24, Saudi.
(14) Majed Hamid Al-Hasry, 29, Saudi.
(15) Abdullah Muhaya Al-Shammary, 24, Saudi

List B

(1) Noor Mohamed Moussa, 21, Chadian.
(2) Manour Mohamed Yousef, 24, Chadian.
(3) Othman Mohamed Kourani, 23, Chadian.
(4) Mohsen Ayed Al-Fadhli, 25, Kuwaiti.
(5) Abdullah Walad Mohamed Sayyed, 37, Mauritanian.
(6) Zaid Hassan Humaid, 34, Yemeni.
(7) Fahd Saleh Al-Mahyani, 24, Saudi.
(8) Adnan Abdullah Al-Sharief, 28, Saudi.
(9) Marzouq Faisal Al-Otaibi, 32, Saudi.
(10) Adel Abdullateef Al-Sanie, 27, Saudi.
(11) Mohamed Abdul Rahman Al-Dhait, 21, Saudi.
(12) Sultan Sunaitan Al-Dhait, 24, Saudi.
(13) Saleh Saeed Al-Ghamdi, 40, Saudi.
(14) Faiz Ibrahim Ayub, 30, Saudi. (See entry for 1 July 2005)
(15) Khaled Mohamed Al-Harbi, 29, Saudi.
(16) Mohamed Othman Al-Zahrani, 44, Saudi.
(17) Abdullah Mohamed Al-Rumayan, 27, Saudi.
(18) Mohamed Saleh Al-Rashoudi, 24, Saudi.
(19) Saad Mohamed Al-Shahry, 31, Saudi.
(20) Ali Matir Al-Osaimy, 23, Saudi.
(21) Faris Abdullah Al-Dhahiry, 22, Saudi. (See entry for 1 July 2005)

1 July - Newspapers report that Faiz Ibrahim Ayub (name 14 on list B) turned himself to a Saudi embassy, perhaps in Beirut. The government denies this.

The family of Faris Abdullah Al-Dhahiry (Name 22 on list B) claim he had been killed in Iraq in November 2004.

3 July - Younus Mohamed Al-Hiyari (The first name on List A) is killed in a shoot-out with police in eastern Riyadh. Six police officers were injured in the clash which included the use of homemade bombs by the militants. Three men were arrested, but their names were not immediately released.

19 July - Saudi Security forces capture a weapons cache in Al-Kharj south of Riyadh. The store included 1,900 kg of fertilizer, 125 kg of ammonium nitrate, aluminum powder, potassium nitrate and other chemicals used by suspected Al-Qaeda militants to make bombs.

20 July - The US Embassy warns US citizens in Saudi Arabia to lower their profile and be on alert due to intelligence indicating preparations were being made for a terrorist attack.

25 July - Mohamed Saeed Al-Amry (number ten on List A) is captured in Madinah along with two unnamed others. He was carrying an explosive device when he was captured.

The US Embassy restricts the travel of US military personnel in the Kingdom to home and office only in light of intelligence indicating planning for a militant strike.

8 August - United States, United Kingdom, Australian and New Zealand embassies and consulates close for two days in response to intelligence. Reuters reports the British government believe a militant attack to be in the final stages of preparation. Saudi security forces increase activity across the kingdom with additional checkpoints presence. Military facilities increase security also. No militant activity or arrests are reported in the press.

18 August - Saudi Security Forces conducted six raids around the kingdom killing four and capturing an unknown number of fighters. During one of these actions, Saleh al-Oufi is reportedly killed in Madinah. He was the fourth name on the original list of 26 most-wanted persons and has been described as the Al Qaeda chief in the kingdom. He had narrowly escaped capture last year. His death leaves on one person on that list unaccounted for.

Newspapers also reported that Farraj Al-Juwait was killed by police near exit five on the Ring Road in Riyadh. Reports mistakenly indicate that this name was on one of the recent lists of most-wanted militants.

3 December - Seventeen unnamed "terror suspect"s are arrested in a series of raids in Riyadh, Al-Kharj and Majmaa. The security services also claimed to have captured an undisclosed amount of explosives and weaponry.

28 December - In separate incidents, Saudi security forces killed two wanted militants in Qassim. Abdul Rahman Saleh Al-Miteb, (#4 on List A) was killed in Um Khashba after a routine traffic stop led to his killing two highway patrolmen. This set off a running gunfight that killed three more police officers. He was killed by gunfire, his body was holding an automatic weapon and a hand grenade.

Abdul Rahman Al-Suwailemi died in custody from his wounds after being captured elsewhere in the region. He was described as a computer expert who managed insurgent websites.

== 2006 ==
24 February - Saudi security forces have thwarted an attempted suicide attack at an oil processing facility in eastern Saudi Arabia, Saudi security sources told CNN. Two pick-up trucks carrying two would-be bombers tried to enter the side gate to the Abqaiq plant in the Eastern Province, the largest oil processing facilities in the world (more than 60% of Saudi production), but the attackers detonated their explosives after security guards fired on them, according to statements from Saudi's interior and oil ministries. According to Saudi sources, the plant was not damaged and only minor damage to one small (1.5 inch) pipeline was caused by splinters, along with serious injuries among security guards and minor injuries among a few Aramco plant workers.

The dead suspects were later named as Muhammed Al-Gaith and Abdullah Al-Tuwaijri. Two members of the security forces were also killed in the fight.

27 February - In a series of predawn raids sparked by the attack on Abqaiq, Saudi security forces killed five unnamed militants (in Al-Yarmouk) and captured another (in Al-Rawabi). In addition, three people were killed by the police at a vehicle checkpoint. Initial reports indicate that the checkpoint incident was a mistake, as those killed were Filipino guest workers.

26 October - Security services announce the arrest of 44 Saudi nationals in Riyadh, Al-Qassim and Hail.

2 December - Security services announce the arrest of 136 Al-Qaeda suspects, including 115 Saudi nationals. Calling the arrests "preemptive," they claim that at least one cell of militants were on the verge of making a suicide attack in the Kingdom.

== 2007 ==
26 February - Three French nationals, including a teenager, murdered during a desert trip near the ancient city Madain Saleh.

== 2008 ==
17 November - Somali pirates captured the Saudi owned oil tanker MV Sirius Star with 25 crew members on board. The tanker was later released after a ransom of £2 million was paid. All crew members were safe.

== 2009 ==
In August, an attempt was made on the life of Saudi Prince and counterintelligence chief Mohammed bin Nayef by al Qaeda operative Abdullah Hasan Tali al-Asiri, who died after detonating an underwear bomb.

== 2012 ==
26 August - A spokesman for the Interior Ministry announced the arrest of 2 Saudis and 6 Yemenis in Riyadh and Jeddah who had been preparing explosives for attacks within the kingdom. One member of the cell had had fingers amputated from injuries sustained by working on explosives. Materials for making bombs were found in a Riyadh mosque.

== 2015 ==
5 January – A pair of suicide bombers attacked a border patrol unit near Arar, killing three soldiers.

22 May – A suicide bomber attacked a Shia mosque in Qatif governate in the Eastern Province. At least 22 were killed and 102 others were injured.

29 May – A suicide bomber attacked a Shia mosque in Dammam, killing 4 people and injuring 4 others.

3 July – A policeman was killed during a "counter-terror" operation in Taif.

16 July – News reports dated 16 July say a suicide attacker detonated his car bomb at a police checkpoint near a prison in Riyadh killing himself and injuring two others.

29 July – Press reports indicate that on 29 July a policeman was killed in a drive-by shooting in the village on Al-Jish in Qatif Province.

7 August – A suicide bomber attacked a Sunni mosque in Abha, in the southern province of Asir. The mosque was inside a military installation controlled by Saudi special forces engaged in the war in nearby Yemen. Press reports indicated 15 people were killed. 12 of them were members of security forces officers and the other three were workers

4 September – Aramco Abqaiq Community, Sgt. Ali Al-Habeeb, 47, was killed during the confrontation with the attacker. The terrorist fled but was chased down by security officers and surrounded inside a home located in the industrial district in the southern part of Abqaiq. Officers had information that he was wearing an explosives belt and asked him to surrender. However, he refused so officers took him out.

== 2016 ==
Total Incidents: 13
54+ (+5) killed
35+ Injured

- 5 January – Four armed men set Saudi Aramco bus on fire in Shia majority city of Qatif.
- 29 January – Mahsen Mosque Attack Four worshippers were killed in a suicide bomb attack in Imam Rida Mosque in al-Hasa, in the Eastern Region of Saudi Arabia. The attackers were 22-year-old Saudi national, Abdur Rahman Abdullah Sulaiman al-Tuwaijiri and an Egyptian national Talha Hisham Mohammed Abdah.
- 25 June – A working policeman was shot dead.
- 30 June – Two adult twin brothers allegedly influenced by ISIS killed their mother and injured two other members of their family for not joining ISIS. The mother's funeral was attended by hundreds.
- 4 July – 2016 Attacks in Saudi Arabia Series of terror attacks happened in three cities of Saudi Arabia including Medina, outside Prophet Mosque – one of the largest and holiest sites after Mecca. Four people are killed in addition to four attackers.
- 12 July – A Saudi border guard was killed by a land mine near the border with Yemen.
- 1 August – Militants shelled a town in the Jizan Region from across the border with Yemen killing four civilians and injuring three.
- 18 September – Government spokesman says the two policemen were killed after facing heavy gunfire while patrolling the city.
- 9 October – At least 25 Saudi soldiers have died in a raid by Huthi militia and its allies near the town of Jizan, on the southwestern tip of Saudi Arabia, as reported by the Yemeni news agency Saba, akin to the Huthi.
- 20 October – At least two people were injured after a shelling in Jizan.
- 30 October – A policeman was killed and another wounded in an attack on their patrol in Saudi town of Qatif.

== 2017 ==
Total Incidents: 10
10 (+8) killed
40 injured

- 7 January – On 7 January 2017, two ISIL terrorists were killed by police in the Al Yasmin suburb of Riyadh. The two men were named as Tayea Salem bin Yaslam Al-Sayari, wanted for previous acts of terrorism, and Talal bin Samran Al-Saedi, who had been released from the Saudi terrorist rehabilitation program. The police officer who killed the terrorists, Cpl. Gibran Jaber Awagy (alternative spelling Jabran Awaji), was injured in the gun battle.
- 21 January – Two suicide bombers detonated their explosives during a firefight with Saudi security forces in Jeddah.
- 8 March – A police officer was killed by an ISIS member. Then the perpetrator was killed by the police.
- 12 May – A Saudi infant and a Pakistani civilian were killed and 10 others civilians, including two Pakistanis, an Indian and a Sudanese, were injured by terrorists in Qatif. An attacker was also killed by the police ISIS is suspected.
- 16 May – A Saudi soldier was killed, and five more were wounded by a rocket-propelled grenade, in a district of al-Awamiya in operations to counter the militants. ISIS is suspected.
- 1 June – Two people were killed in a car explosion in Al-Qatif, Saudi Arabia just before Maghrib prayers. Three men involved in the attack managed to escape and are currently being hunted by security officers in the area Hezbollah Al-Hejaz is suspected.
- 11 June – One soldier was killed and two wounded after a bomb attack in the town of Al-Awamiyah Hezbollah Al-Hejaz is suspected.
- 23 June – A suicide bomber blew himself up during a police raid in the city of Mecca.
- 4 July – A Saudi policeman was killed and three others injured by an explosive device in a flashpoint Shiite-dominated city Hezbollah Al-Hejaz is suspected.
- 6 July – A Saudi policeman was killed and six others injured by an explosive device exploded next to a police patrol in the village of Al-Awamiyah near Al-Qatif Hezbollah Al-Hejaz is suspected.
- 14 July – A Saudi soldier was killed and another was wounded in a shooting attack on their patrol vehicle in the kingdom's Qatif province Hezbollah Al-Hejaz is suspected.
- 3 August – A Saudi citizen was killed and another injured during an operation to secure families wishing to leave Awamiya, after an armed attack by terrorists on a bus Hezbollah Al-Hejaz is suspected.

== 2018 ==
- 8 July - Three gunmen opened fire from a vehicle on a security checkpoint along the Buraidah-Tarfiyah road in Al-Qassim Province. Staff Sergeant Suleiman Abdulaziz Al-Abdullatif and a Bangladeshi expatriate. Investigations were launched by Saudi authorities.

== 2019 ==
- 7 April - Four attackers targeted a vehicle checkpoint in the Abu Hadriya area along the Dammam-Jubail highway in the Eastern Province. Two assailants were killed and two others arrested after security forces returned fire. Two non-Saudi civilians and two Saudi security personnel sustained injuries during the exchange. Weapons including machine guns, pistols, and a hand grenade were recovered at the scene.
- 21 April - Four heavily armed men attempted to storm the General Directorate of Investigations Center in the town of Al-Zulfi, approximately 260 kilometres northwest of Riyadh. All four were killed by security forces during the assault. Three security officers were wounded. The Islamic State claimed responsibility via its Amaq news agency, and thirteen additional suspects were arrested the following day.
- 14 September - A coordinated barrage of drones and cruise missiles struck Saudi Aramco's oil processing facility at Abqaiq and the Khurais oil field in eastern Saudi Arabia in the pre-dawn hours. No casualties were reported at the facilities. Yemen's Houthi movement claimed responsibility; however, Saudi Arabian and United States officials attributed the attack to Iran.

== See also ==
- Response of Saudi Arabia to ISIL
