= Path of Blood =

- Directed by: Jonathan Hacker
- Produced by: Jonathan Hacker; Thomas Small
- Narrated by: Samuel West
- Edited by: Peter Haddon
- Music by: Chad Hobson
- Distributed by: Paladin United States; Trinity Film United Kingdom
- Release date: 13 July 2018 (United States)
- Running time: 91 minutes
- Country: United Kingdom
- Languages: English, Arabic

Path of Blood is a 2018 British documentary film directed by Jonathan Hacker and sourced from several hundred hours of raw amateur footage filmed by Al Qaeda and captured by Saudi Arabian security services.

Path of Blood is an archive-driven picture told in the present tense. The film explores the battle between Al Qaeda and the security services in Saudi Arabia between 2003 and 2009 during which Al Qaeda in the Kingdom were successful in carrying out a number of terrorist atrocities against various government and civilian targets. The film was released in the United States on 13 July 2018.

== Synopsis ==
In 2001, in the rubble of Tora Bora, Osama bin Laden orders his most senior lieutenants to return to his homeland of Saudi Arabia and launch a revolution. Their aim: to conquer the land of the Two Holy Mosques and from there to establish a worldwide Muslim empire that would take on the West and win.

The May 2003 Riyadh compound bombings that launch Al Qaeda’s campaign in Saudi Arabia, take Saudi society by surprise. But the government is quick to respond, and the stoic security chief Prince Muhammad bin Nayef relentlessly focuses all the firepower of the Saudi state on tracking down and killing the terrorists. Al Qaeda still has a lot up its sleeves and both sides are forced to ratchet up the violence.

During the course of the war that follows, intelligence services captured hundreds of tapes shot by Al Qaeda’s own foot soldiers. Using only this material, as well as rare CSI footage shot by police to record the carnage, this film tells the story of Al Qaeda’s mission to topple the House of Saud.

=== Timeline of key events ===
Abbreviations

AQAP – Al Qaeda in the Arabian Peninsula

MOI – Ministry of Interior (Saudi Arabia)

- 18 March 2003 – Fahd al-Saadi, a Yemeni member of Al Qaeda in Saudi Arabia, accidentally sets off an explosive device at a safe house in Riyadh, killing himself and alerting the authorities to the presence of an active terrorist network within the Kingdom.
- 22 April 2003 – A major shootout occurs between Al Qaeda militants, led by AQAP leader Turki al-Dandani, and police during an attempt raid on a safe house in Wadi Laban, west Riyadh. All of the militants escape.
- 12 May 2003 – Al Qaeda bomb three residential compounds in east Riyadh, killing 27 people and wounding over 200. Most of the victims are foreigners working in the Kingdom.
- 8 November 2003 – Al Qaeda bomb the Muhaya residential compound in west Riyadh during Ramadan, killing seventeen people and wounding over a hundred. Most of the victims are Muslims.
- Early March 2004 – Al Qaeda's plans to carry out a much larger co-ordinated bomb attack in Riyadh's diplomatic quarter are thwarted by a series of raids and arrests. The attack is called off and a new plan is drawn up.
- 17 March 2004 – Abdel Aziz al-Muqrin formally names the terrorist organisation under his leadership Al Qaeda in the Arabian Peninsula (AQAP).
- 21 April 2004 – Al Qaeda bomb the General Directorate of Traffic in Riyadh, having failed to reach their intended target, the headquarters of the Emergency Forces. Six people are killed and 148 are wounded. All victims are Muslims.
- 1 May 2004 – Al Qaeda militants shoot and kill seven people at the premises of ABB Lummus Co. in Yanbu, on the west coast of Saudi Arabia. All but one of the victims are foreigners.
- 23 May 2004 – Crown Prince Abdullah bin Abdulaziz tells prominent intellectuals at a Royal Diwan in Jeddah that they must play a greater role in providing guidance to Saudi youth, and that failure to report extremism will be considered treachery.
- 29 May 2004 – Al Qaeda militants in the eastern city of Khobar shoot and kill 22 people in multiple locations across the city before escaping undetected. They kill four at the Arab Petroleum Investments Corporation (APICORP) building and four at the city’s Petroleum Centre, before taking more than 200 people hostage at the Oasis Residential compound, killing 14. Al Qaeda claim the militants were able evade capture and escaped from the compound. 2004 Khobar massacre
- 6 June 2004 – Al Qaeda shoot BBC security correspondent Frank Gardner (journalist) and kill his cameraman Simon Cumbers in the Suwaidi neighbourhood of southern Riyadh. Abdel Aziz al-Muqrin is later reported to have been present.
- 12 June 2004 – Paul Marshall Johnson, Jr., a US expatriate working for the Advanced Electronic Company (AEC), is kidnapped by Abdel Aziz al-Muqrin’s cell in Riyadh. On 13 June they broadcast a video of their hostage demanding the government exchange him for imprisoned Al Qaeda members. On 18 June, when their demands are not met, they torture and behead him on tape.
- 18 June 2004 – Hours after the beheading of Johnson, Abdel Aziz al-Muqrin and three of his senior deputies are cornered by Saudi security services at a petrol station in central Riyadh. In the shootout that follows, all four militants are killed.
- 23 June 2004 – The Saudi government offers a thirty-day limited amnesty to ‘terrorists’. Six AQAP members turn themselves in.
- 20 July 2004 – The Saudi security services raid a villa in the King Fahd neighbourhood of Riyadh. This villa had served as AQAP’s main Media Centre, producing both Voice of Jihad magazine and the group’s propaganda videos. Security forces seize hundreds of hours of Al Qaeda video footage and discover Paul Marshall Johnson’s head in a freezer.
- 21 September 2004 – The Saudi government broadcasts the first in a series of programmes on television featuring interviews with former members of AQAP.
- 6 December 2004 – Al Qaeda storm the US Consulate in Jeddah but fail to break into the main consulate building. Five consulate guards are killed and twelve people are wounded.
- 29 December 2004 – A double car bomb attack targets the Ministry of Interior (MOI) and the headquarters of the Emergency Services. Both car bombs are prevented from getting close enough to their targets to cause significant damage. The suicide bombers are the only fatalities.
- 3 April 2005 – Saudi security forces launch a three-day siege against 19 Al Qaeda members who have barricaded themselves inside a villa in the town of al-Rass. Fourteen militants are killed and five arrested.
- 24 June 2005 –It is reported that Abdullah al-Rashoud, a leading AQAP preacher, has been killed by a US air strike in Iraq.
- 1 August 2005 – King Fahd bin Abdulaziz of Saudi Arabia dies aged 84. He is succeeded by his half-brother, Crown Prince Abdullah.
- 4 September 2005 – Two Al Qaeda members fire upon police outside of a supermarket in Dammam, Eastern Province. Police trace the militants back to a villa in the Mubarakiya neighbourhood, where they engage Al Qaeda in a two-day siege. Four security men are killed and over seventy are wounded.
- 24 February 2006 – An Al Qaeda cell led by Fahd al-Juwayr carries out a twin truck bomb attack on an Aramco oil refinery in Abqaiq, Eastern Province. The group kills three security guards, but fails to cause major damage to refinery.
- 27 February 2006 – Fahd al-Juwayr’s group are tracked by security forces back to a rented villa in the Yarmouk neighbourhood of eastern Riyadh. A gunfight ensues in which all five members of the cell are killed, including leader Juwayr.
- 28 August 2009 – Suicide bomber Abdullah al-Asiri attempts to assassinate Prince Muhammad bin Nayef at his palace in Jeddah. The prince survives with only minor injuries.

== Reception ==
On review aggregator Rotten Tomatoes, the film holds an approval rating of 85% based on 27 reviews, with an average rating of 7.3/10. Metacritic gives the film a weighted average score of 63 out of 100, based on 11 critics.

A Parliamentary screening of the film was hosted by Neil Coyle MP and held at Portcullis House in November 2018 to highlight the "important lessons offered by the film around the radicalisation of youngsters."

The film had a particularly good reception in the United Kingdom receiving four star reviews from The Times, Financial Times, FT Weekend, The Guardian, Time Out, Radio Times, and Total Film. It also received strong reviews from the New Statesman, Sight and Sound, and The Economist.
