= Aimen Dean =

Saudi-born ex-member of al-Qaeda, former spy

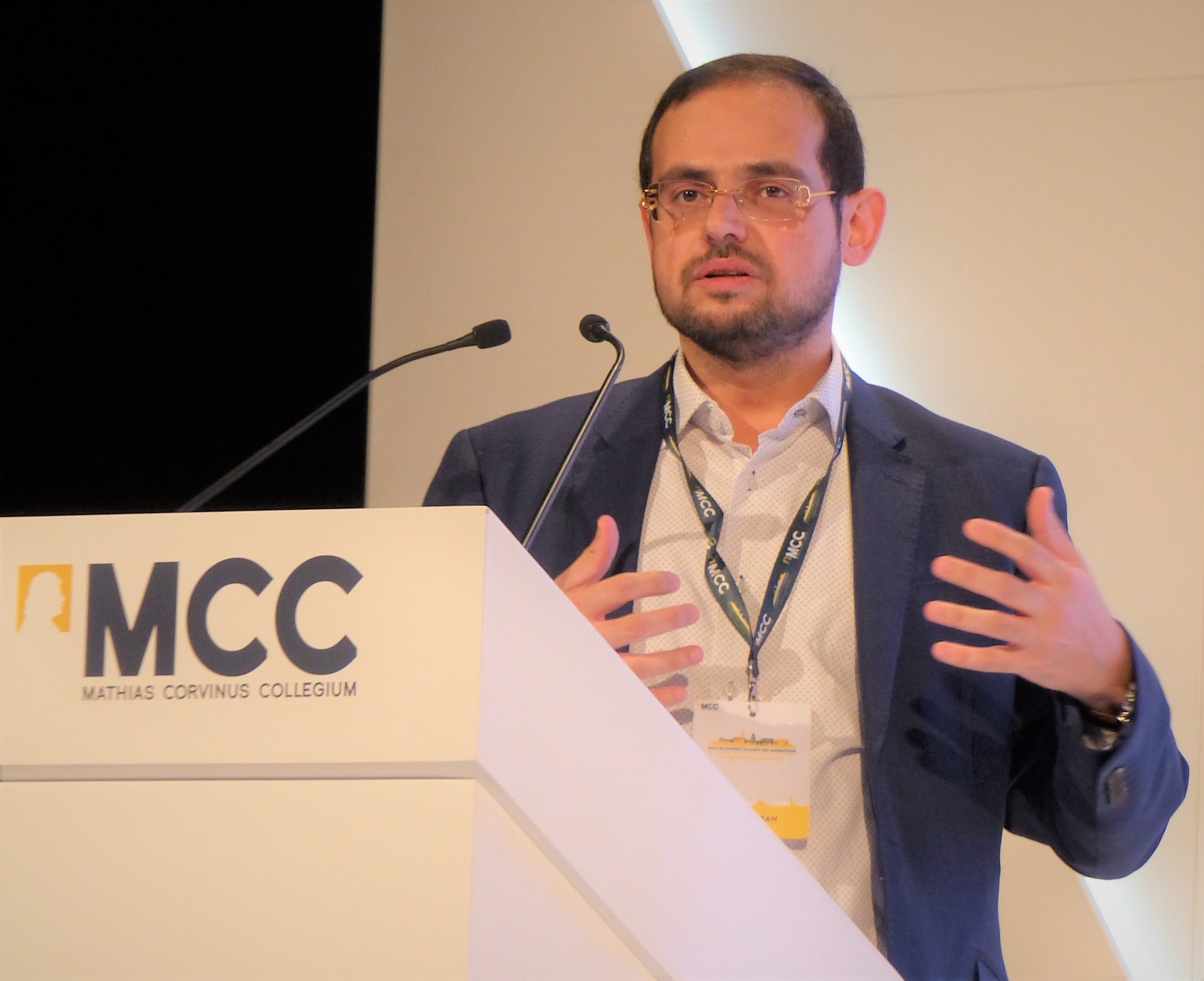
- Dean at the MCC Budapest Summit in 2019
- Born: 1978 (age 47–48); Saudi Arabia
- Other names: Ali Al-Durrani; Abu Abbas Al-Bahraini

Aimen Dean (Arabic: أيمن دین; born 1978) is a former member of al-Qaeda. In 1998, he was recruited by the Secret Intelligence Service and became an informant.

== Early life ==
Dean was born in Saudi Arabia. By the age of 12, he had memorised the Quran (thereby becoming a hafiz). Following the death of his mother he sought solace in Sayyid Qutb's In the Shade of the Quran. He was part of an Islamic Awareness circle at Umar ibn Abd al-Aziz Mosque in Khobar, where one of the instructors was al-Ayiri. In 1989, his eldest brother Moheddin went to fight in Afghanistan for three months. At 16, he travelled to Bosnia to participate in the Bosnian War with Khaled Ali Hajj, a friend from the circle who had returned from fighting in Afghanistan.

In Bosnia, Dean was part of the Bosnian mujahideen Brigade who captured and killed some 50 prisoners following the Battle for Vozuća, abusing, torturing, stabbing and ritually beheading some of the prisoners. Just before the end of the war he was recruited by Khalid Sheikh Mohammed, who suggested that he go to Afghanistan and give him a contact in Peshawar, Pakistan.

== Al-Qaeda ==
Following Bosnia, Dean was invited to Kandahar to swear allegiance to Osama bin Laden and join al-Qaeda. In Afghanistan, he trained al-Qaeda recruits in the basics of Islamic theology, history and the essentials of religious practice. He was worried by the 1998 United States embassy bombings and asked Abdullah al-Mohaja for the religious justification.

He was pointed to a 13th-century fatwa by Ibn Taymiyyah. He researched the fatwa which was about the Mongol invasion and their use of human shields when besieging cities; it was clear to him that this was no justification for killing civilian bystanders. He believes the concept of Jihad has been changed by al-Qaeda, and its goal is to start a world war against the West.

== Spying ==
Dean decided to leave al-Qaeda, going to Qatar on the pretext of his health with the intention of disappearing. He was captured on arrival in Qatar by Qatari Intelligence, who gave him a choice of intelligence agency and he chose to work with MI6. MI6 then spent seven months debriefing him, after which he agreed to go back to Afghanistan as a spy.

Dean then spied on al-Qaeda for 8 years prior to being exposed. During this time, he travelled between Afghanistan and London on behalf of al-Qaeda allowing him to report to MI6. While in the UK, he acted as al-Qaeda's representative and had to be careful to preach and recruit within UK law.

Dean's cover was blown by Ron Suskind who, using CIA sources, disclosed his identity with details that could only be sourced to Dean in an excerpt of The One Percent Doctrine for Time.

== Later career ==
After being exposed, Dean started a career as a speaker and security consultant. Since 2019 Dean has been hosting the podcast Conflicted, which analyzes the political situation and historical background of the present-day Middle East.

Dean is the author of two books:

- The Eternal Bridge Over the River Innocence: A novel about the story of what happens to young bright and decent Muslims who come under radical influence.
- Nine Lives: My Time As MI6's Top Spy Inside al-Qaeda: biography of his life as a spy inside al-Qaeda

In August 2022, Dean accused his five-year-old daughter's school, St George's School, Edinburgh, of discriminating against their family due to his past. Dean planned to leave the UK, where he had been granted permanent residence, with his family to find a school for his children in the Middle East.

On 7 October 2023, Dean posted on X, suggesting that Hamas's use of Huawei devices was part of the reason why Israel's security apparatus failed to detect and thwart its plans to carry out the October 7 attacks. He explained that US tech companies had banned Huawei from using their systems, compelling it to build its own in-house solutions that only China could compromise easily.
