= Aufi =

Aufi can refer to:

- Aufi Tower, Aufhausen, Germany
- Zahiroddin Nasr Mohammad Aufi (1171-1242), a medieval Persian author
- Abdul-Rahim Hamed Aufi (born 1963), Iraqi soccer player
- Saleh Al-Aufi (died 2005), member of al-Qaeda in Saudi Arabia
