= Younis Mohammed Ibrahim al-Hayari =

Member of Al-Qaeda killed in Saudi Arabia

Younis Mohammed Ibrahim al-Hayari يونس محمد ابراهيم الحياري
- Born: 1969; Morocco
- Died: 3 July 2005 (aged 35–36); Riyadh, Saudi Arabia
- Military career
- Allegiance: Al-Qaeda
- Service years: 1992–2005
- Conflicts: Bosnian War (1992–1995); Riyadh clash (2005) †

Younis Mohammed Ibrahim al-Hayari (Arabic: يونس محمد ابراهيم الحياري, 1969 – 3 July 2005) was a Moroccan Al-Qaeda member.

== Background ==
During the 1990s, al-Hayari fought in Bosnia. He was listed first on Saudi Arabia's list of their 36 "most wanted terrorist suspects,” which was published on 28 June 2005. The following month, on 3 July 2005, he was reported killed in a shootout involving Saudi Arabian security forces in Riyadh. At the time of his death, he was reportedly the leader of Al-Qaeda in Saudi Arabia.

According to Saudi officials, al-Hayari had travelled to Saudi Arabia for Hajj in 2001 and subsequently went underground. He was accused of participating in various attacks in the country, in collaboration with fellow Moroccan militant Karim el-Mejjati, with the latter having been killed a few weeks earlier in a raid that took place at Al-Rass.
