= August 2018 Baghlan Province attack =

Taliban attack of Afghan National Army base

- Part of the War in Afghanistan (2001–2021)
- Location: Baghlan-e-Markazi District, Baghlan Province, Afghanistan
- Date: August 15, 2018
- Target: Afghan National Army base and police checkpoints
- Deaths: 45 killed: 36 soldiers; 9 policemen; 70 killed (Taliban claim)
- Perpetrator: (Afghanistan) Taliban

On 15 August 2018, Taliban fighters attacked an Afghan National Army base and police checkpoints in Baghlan Province, the fighting lasted five hours and resulted in the deaths of at least 36 soldiers and 9 policemen. The attack occurred the same day Kabul was struck by a suicide bombing that left 48 dead, and one day after a base was besieged in Faryab. Hundreds of Taliban fighters reportedly took part in the predawn attack according to anonymous Afghan police official, by the end, the base had been completely overrun. Only two soldiers survived the attack, causing Afghan officials to believe they were possibly involved

The Taliban claimed 70 soldiers and policemen were killed. A video released on Voice of Jihad, the Talibans official website, showed the aftermath of the assault. The video shows Taliban fighters walking around the base, showing off vehicles, weapons, and ammunition that were looted, it also showed the bodies of some of the dead soldiers.
