= Faris al-Zahrani =

Saudi Arabian terrorist

- فارس آل شويل
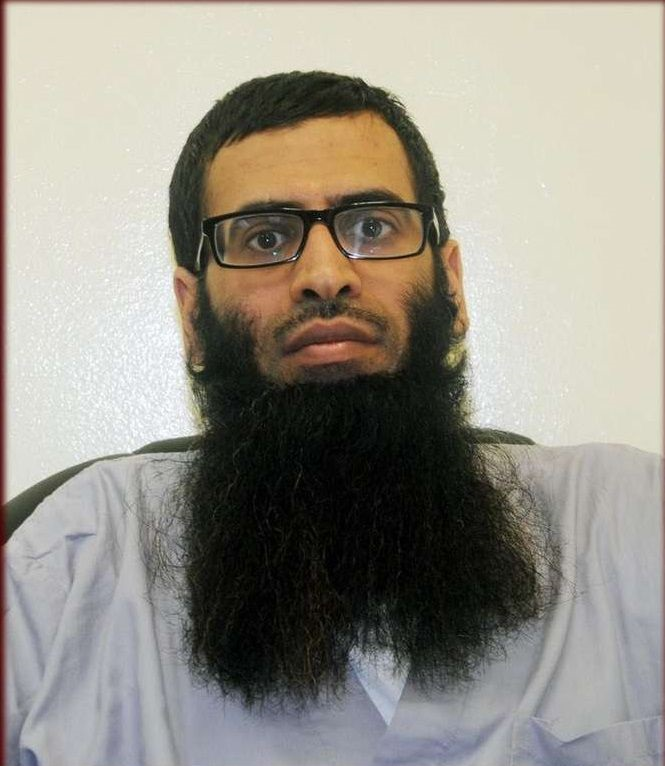
- Born: 1977; Saudi Arabia
- Died: 2 January 2016
- Cause of death: Execution
- Other name: Abu Jandal al-Azdi
- Known for: Al-Qaeda terrorist

Faris bin Ahmed bin Jam'an bin Ali Aal Shuwayl al-Hassani al-Zahrani al-Azdi (Arabic: فارس بن أحمد بن جمعان بن علي آل شويل الحسني الزهراني الأزدي; 1977 – January 2, 2016) was a terrorist who was on Saudi Arabia's list of 26 'most-wanted' suspected terrorists.

He was a part of al-Qaeda. He was known for conducting research which showed al-Qaeda in a positive light. His prominence rose especially after the killing of the leader of al-Qaeda of Saudi Arabia, Abdel Aziz al-Muqrin. He made a post denouncing his Saudi Arabian citizenship under the assumption of the state apostatizing from Islam.

He was arrested in early August 2004. On 2 January 2016, al-Zahrani was executed by the Saudi state along with 46 others convicted of terrorism.

== Life ==
Fares bin Ahmad al-Zahrani was born in 1977 in al-Jawfa’ village in Bilad Zahran in the Al-Baha region of Saudi Arabia. His family later moved to a nearby village known as al-Nu’us. Where Fares would attend and graduate elementary school. Later he would attend and graduate high school in the same village in 1996, receiving high grades. Information on where Fares went to college differs depending on the source.

He was said to have attended the Kulliyat ‘Ulum al-Quran in al-Madina, for one semester, and the University of King Khaled in Abha (from which he got a BA in 2000).

There is no clear date when Fares al-Zahrani became a terrorist wanted by the Saudi authorities. What is known is that he started writing under two identities online after a series of deadly clashes between the Saudi government and jihadists in 2003. In November a list of 26 suspected terrorists was released with al-Zahrani's name on it.

Fares al-Zahrani was active online under two names: al-Mutaharek and Abu Jandal al-Azadi (a pen name derived from his Azd tribal heritage that he digitally published some of his earlier books under). Among the message boards Fares was active in was Minbar al-Jihad wa-al-Tawhid, a popular message board dealing with Jihad-related issues. The same blog later interviewed him, in the only known interview he's ever given.

Al-Zahrani's first noteworthy book was al-Baheth ‘Ann Hikm Qatl Afrad wa-Dubat al-Mabaheth (English: For Those Who are Looking for the Rule to Kill Police Officers). It was released after a series of deadly confrontations with the Saudi police, and came as the product of many online arguments on Jihadi blogs. It contained an attempt to find religious approval for killing police officers. al-Zahrani was able to make the links between the Quran, Hadith, and various militant thinkers (namely Sayyid Qutb and Abu Qatada) to justify the act of murder. al-Zahrani's second book on a similar topic, Tahrid al-Mujahidin al-Abtal Ala Ihya’ Sinat al-Ightiyal (English: Encouraging the Hero Mujahidin to Revive the Sanctioned Practice: Assassination) again provided religious Fatwa for killing others.

In addition to his writings, Fares al-Zahrani posted many audio recordings, the most known being Your citizenship is under my feet, a speech denouncing his Saudi citizenship because the Ummah did not recognize any modern borders or nationalities. It was quoted in 2014 by Saudi fighters in the ranks of the Islamic State of Iraq and the Levant when they tore up and burned their Saudi Passports in a famous video.

== Arrest ==
He was arrested in Abha by Saudi police on 5 August 2004 on charges of terrorism. His capture was considered a serious blow to al-Qaeda in Saudi Arabia.

Four weeks prior to his arrest, al-Zahrani wrote an article in which he said he was evading the Saudi crackdown. Several weeks before the arrest in an interview with the online publication Voice of Jihad, al-Zahrani said: "I would like to reassure the people who love me...I am careful in my movements and contacts, and I take all necessary precautions." In the same statement, al-Zahrani rejected an amnesty that King Fahd had offered militants in June.

Al-Zahrani and another man were arrested without incident, even though both were armed.

== Bibliography ==
- Tahrid al-Mujahidin al-Abtal Ala Ihya’ Sinat al-Ightiyal
- al-Baheth ‘Ann Hikm Qatl Afrad wa-Dubat al-Mabaheth
- al-Ayat wa al-Ahadith al-Ghazirah fi Kifr Quwat Rad’ al-Jazeerah
- Nusus al-Fuqaha’ Hawl Ahkam al-Gharah wa-al-Tatarrus.
- Usamah Ibn LAden Mujadded al-Zaman wa-Qaher al-Amrican
- Wujub Istinqaz al-Mustdafin min Sujun al-Tawagheet wa-al-Murtaddin
- Allahu Akbar Kharabet Amrica
- Tarikhiyah lil-Matlibin
