= Al-Khansaa (magazine) =

Arabic-language women's magazine named Al-Khansaa.

Al-Khansaa was an online women's magazine launched in 2004 by the Saudi branch of al-Qaeda.

The magazine claimed to have been founded by Saudi leader Abd-al-Aziz al-Muqrin shortly before his death. It offered advice on first aid for wounded family members, how to raise children to believe in Jihad and physical training for women to prepare for combat.

The magazine was named after Al-Khansaa, an Arab poet and a contemporary of Muhammad.
