= Yusuf al-Ayiri =

Saudi Arabian terrorist and Al-Qaeda leader

Yusuf bin Salih bin Fahd al-Ayeri
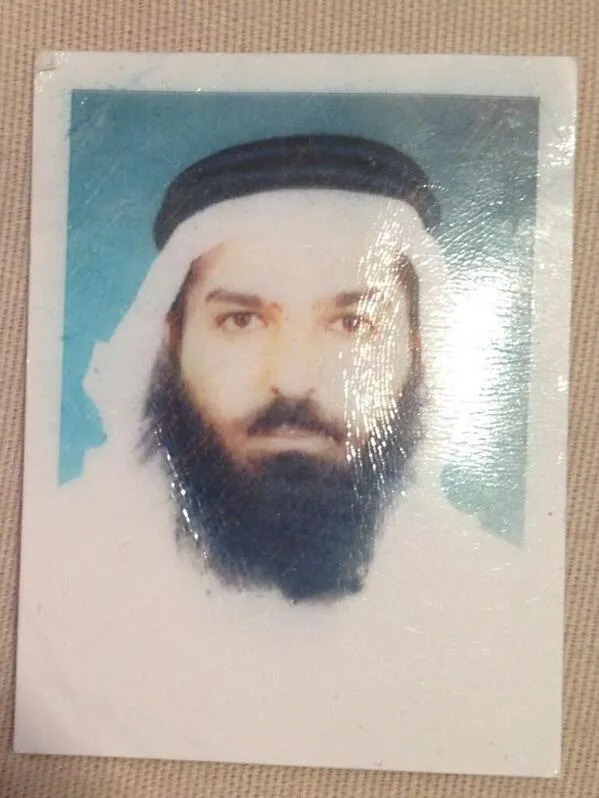

Leader of Al-Qaeda in the Land of the Two Mosques
- Succeeded by: Khaled Ali Hajj

Personal details
- Born: April 24, 1974 Dammam, Saudi Arabia
- Died: June 2, 2003 (aged 29) Mecca, Saudi Arabia

Yusuf al-Ayeri (Arabic: يوسف العييري) or Yusuf bin Salih bin Fahd al-'Uyayri (1974 – 2003; known by a number of aliases, including al-Battar—the Arabic name of one of the swords of Muhammad—conventionally rendered "Swift Sword" in English) was a Saudi Arabian member of Al-Qaeda, and the first-ever leader of al-Qaeda in Saudi Arabia.

== Biography ==
Born on 24 April 1974 in Dammam, Saudi Arabia to an upper-middle-class family, Ayeri was known for taking part in illegal street racing, before dropping out of secondary school at age 18 and travelling to Afghanistan, where he received paramilitary training in the Al Farouq training camp, eventually becoming a trainer at the camp. Ayeri briefly served as a bodyguard of Al Qaeda leader Osama bin Laden, with whom he traveled to Sudan.

The leader of the Somali militant Islamist group Al-Shabaab, Ahmed Godane, said that Saif al-Adel and Yusef al-Ayeri played an important role in the 1993 Battle of Mogadishu by providing training and participating in the battle directly.

After the 1996 Khobar Towers bombing in Saudi Arabia, Ayeri was arrested by Saudi authorities and tortured. After two years he was released and was tasked by Bin Laden with organizing Al Qaeda's branch within Saudi Arabia.

According to Ron Suskind's One-percent Doctrine, he was the mastermind of a planned cyanide gas attack on both the New York City Subway and the PATH (both of which were canceled shortly before they were to happen).

Before his death, he also wrote a number of strategic documents on Al-Qaeda. According to Ron Suskind's One-percent Doctrine,

First, it was discovered that this al-Ayeri was behind a Web site, al-Nida, that U.S. investigators had long felt carried some of the most specialized analysis and coded directives about al Qaeda's motives and plans. He was also the anonymous author of two extraordinary pieces of writing -- short books, really, that had recently moved through cyberspace, about al Qaeda's underlying strategies. The Future of Iraq and the Arabian Peninsula After the Fall of Baghdad, written as the United States prepared its attack, said that an American invasion of Iraq would be the best possible outcome for al Qaeda, stoking extremism throughout the Persian Gulf and South Asia, and achieving precisely the radicalizing quagmire that bin Laden had hoped would occur in Afghanistan. A second book, Crusaders' War, outlined a tactical model for fighting the American forces in Iraq, including "assassination and poisoning the enemy's food and drink," remotely triggered explosives, suicide bombings, and lightning strike ambushes. It was the playbook.

Al-Ayeri was killed in 2003 in a gun-battle with Saudi security forces as part of the crackdown on Islamic insurgency in Saudi Arabia. He was 29 years old at the time of his death.

== Personal life ==
He was married to the sister of the wife of Shaykh Sulayman al-Ulwan, himself considered a radical cleric and put in jail by the Saudi authorities for this reason, with whom he had three daughters.

== Writings ==
The scholar of Islamism Roel Meijer says that "what immediately strikes the reader of the works of Ayiri is their scope, depth, and length" as "between 1998, when he was released from prison, until his death [in 2003], he managed to publish hundreds of pages" on different topics.

The famous journalist Abdel Bari Atwan said of him that he was "al-Qa'ida's first webmaster and an influential ideologue who wrote thirty books."

== See also ==
- Abu Musab al-Suri
- Abu Omar al-Saif
