= Al-Qaeda in the Land of the Two Mosques =

Saudi branch of Al-Qaeda

- Other name: Al-Qaeda in Saudi Arabia
- Founders: Osama bin Laden, Yusuf al-Ayiri
- Leaders: Yusuf al-Ayiri (2001 - 2003); Khaled Ali Hajj (2003-2004); Abdel Aziz al-Muqrin (2004 - 2004); Saud al-Otaybi (2004 - 2005); Saleh al-Awfi (2005 - 2005); Fahd al-Juwair (2005 - 2006)
- Dates active: 2001-2009
- Country: Saudi Arabia
- Ideology: Salafi jihadism Wahhabism
- Part of: Al-Qaeda

Al-Qaeda in the Land of the Two Mosques (Arabic: القاعدة في بلاد الحرمين, romanized: al-Qāʻida fī Bilād al-Ḥaramayn), officially known as al-Qaeda in the Arabian Peninsula (Note: Not to be confused with the modern Al-Qaeda in the Arabian Peninsula, the group's successor) or simplified as Al-Qaeda in Saudi Arabia, was the Saudi Arabian regional branch of al-Qaeda. It was founded shortly after the September 11 attacks, and dissolved in 2009 after it merged with al-Qaeda in Yemen to form al-Qaeda in the Arabian Peninsula.

== Background ==
After the September 11 attacks, Osama bin Laden ordered that a branch of al-Qaeda be established in his home country of Saudi Arabia. Al-Ayiri eventually established it and was its first leader. Their first attack was meant to be a bombing in eastern Riyadh, in which the bombs were being prepared in a house in the Al-Jazira neighborhood. On March 18, 2003, a bomb prematurely exploded while it was being prepared in the house, causing the death of the explosives engineer, Fahd bin Saran Al-Saedi. After the police arrived at the house, it was found that the house contained highly explosive materials, ammunition, 12 machine guns, two rifles, three bombs, a laboratory, and fake identities. This operation was the first spark for launching the Anti-Terror operations in Saudi Arabia and declaring war on al-Qaeda. On May 6, 2003, security forces chased a suspicious car. During the chase, security forces uncovered an empty house in the Ishbiliyah neighborhood in eastern Riyadh, in which a group of al-Qaeda militants were hiding. In the house, 55 hand grenades were found. Various ammunition, several travel documents, identity proofs, other notebooks and pamphlets, sums of money, large iron bags filled with highly explosive paste materials, AK-47 machine guns, computers, and communications devices were also found. The house contained large amounts of disguise tools, such as wigs and masks. The explosive was RDX.

On May 8, 2003, the Saudi government issued a list containing the names of 19 members of al-Qaeda in Saudi Arabia. This was the first list in the history of Saudi Arabia to announce the names of those wanted in security cases. The list included the most prominent members of the organization, namely, Turki Al-Dandani, Ali Al-Faq'asi, Khaled Al-Juhani, Saleh Al-Oufi, Abdul Aziz Al-Muqrin, Abdul Karim Al-Yazji, Hani Al-Ghamidi, Muhammad Al-Walidi Al-Shehri, Rakan Al-Sikhan, Youssef Al-Aairi, Uthman Al-Umrain, Bandar Al-Ghamidi, Ahmed Al-Dakhil, Hamad Al-Shammari, Faisal Al-Dakhil, Sultan Gibran Sultan Al-Qahtani, Gibran Hakmi, Abdel Rahman Jabbara, Khaled Haj.

== Initial activities ==
AQBH's first successful attacks were a series of bombings; the first of which were four explosions that occurred in the capital, Riyadh, on May 12, 2003. AQBH made suicide operations using car bombs filled with explosives, and targeted four residential complexes, the first being the Granada Village, an upper-class private residential complex, the second targeting the Jawadul residential complex, the third occurring in the Al-Badiah neighborhood, and the fourth explosion targeting the Al-Hamra complex. The Saudi Ministry of Interior announced that the number of deaths resulting from the explosions had reached 20 people, while the number of injured had reached 194 people, most of whom sustained minor injuries. In addition, there were 9 charred bodies at the sites of the explosions, suspected to be AQBH suicide bombers. The presence of security personnel present in the complexes before the explosion and their exchange of fire with the terrorists contributed to avoiding major injuries and deaths among the residents of those complexes. The next day, the Saudi government announced that the death toll from the complex bombings in Riyadh had risen to 29 dead and 194 others injured. Among the casualties were 9 of the suicide bombers, including 5 on the list of 19: Khaled Al-Juhani, Muhammad Al-Walidi Al-Shehri, Hani Abdel-Karim Al-Ghamdi, Gibran Hakami, and Abdel-Karim Al-Yazji. After the series of bombings that occurred in Riyadh, Saudi Arabia launched widespread arrest campaigns and raids that led to the dismantling of many cells, and the killing and arrest of many of their members. In attempts to avoid the recurrence of suicide operations by arresting members of AQBH, before carrying out their suicide operations. The first campaign was on May 18, 2003, when Public Security forces arrested 4 AQBH members.

On May 20, Public Security forces arrested 3 Moroccan citizens in the city of Jeddah. On May 24, Public Security forces stormed an empty house belonging to AQBH, and found two bags containing highly explosive RDX materials. On the same day in Medina, Public Security forces arrested a Yemeni smuggler for smuggling 60 kg of TNT explosives to AQBH. On May 26, Public Security forces arrested 5 wanted people, two of whom were inside a house in the Al-Iskan neighbourhood in Medina. They are the ideologues of AQBH, and they were Ahmed Hamad Al-Khalidi, Ali Al-Khudair, and Fahd Al-Khudair, and three of them were in an Internet café in Medina, and they were: Saad. Abdul Razzaq Faydi Al-Ghamdi, Turki Abdul-Aziz Al-Fuhaid, and Muhammad Abdel-Fattah Muhammad Karam, a Moroccan citizen, were in possession of weapons and materials used to make explosives. On May 27, Public Security forces arrested in a villa in the Al-Azhari district of Medina: Nasser Hamad Hamin Al-Fahd, Muhammad Salem Al-Ghamdi, Hisham Mubarak Al-Hakami, Omar Mubarak Al-Hakami, Majdi Ahmed Muhammad Ibrahim Abdullah Al-Khabarani, and Talib Ahmed Karim, a Moroccan. A group of various wires were seized from them to create electrical circuits for the purpose of detonation, chemicals, ammunition boxes, AK-47 machine guns, pistols, and a group of leaflets on which I wrote how to prepare explosive devices, and sums of cash. After a chase for one of the cars that fled from one of the arrest sites, the Public Security Forces were able to stop the car and arrest those in it. It turned out that it was driven by the so-called Abdel Moneim Ali Mahfouz Al-Ghamdi, and he was accompanied by three Arab women without IDs. They were Ghaida Ahmed Muhammad Sweida, of Syrian nationality, and she is the wife of the aforementioned Abdel Moneim. Hanan Abdullah Raqib, of Moroccan nationality, is the wife of Sultan Gibran Sultan Al-Qahtani, and Al-Ayadiah Ahmed Muhammad Al-Sayyad, of Moroccan nationality, is the wife of Ali Abdul Rahman Al-Faqaisi. Firearms and forged documents were seized from them.

The Saudi government dealt the strongest blow to AQBH on June 1, 2003, when public security forces in the city of Turbah in the northern Hail region stopped a confusing Toyota with two people traveling in it parked on the road and suspected it. When the security forces asked the driver to prove his identity, he fled, and the security chased them, as they took a desert road. During the chase, the two fugitives threw a hand grenade at the security officers, which resulted in the death of two soldiers and the injury of two other soldiers. After chasing them, the first leader of AQBH, Al-Ayiri, was killed, and the other were arrested, and after investigation it was found that they tried to escape to Iraq.

== Saudi government crackdowns ==
After the killing of Al-Ayiri, Khaled Al-Hajj assumed leadership of AQBH. Khaled Al-Hajj established 5 teams, the first being Al-Kharj team. The mission of that team was to collect information about Prince Sultan Air Base for a future attack. As for the second team, their mission was to collect information about the King Khalid Air Base for the same reason. The third team, their mission was to smuggle and transport their team leader, Turki Al-Dandani, and his main aides from Riyadh the day before the bombings occurred, and hide them in Al-Ahsa Oasis. As for the fourth team, which was the Al-Jawf team, their mission was to support the third team. As for the fifth team, their mission was to plan attacks on residential complexes housing foreigners, the Al Faisaliah Tower, the Jeddah Tower, and a bus transporting foreign children. The task of management these five cells was entrusted to Turki al-Dandani and Ali al-Barqi.

Saudi Arabia's security campaigns did not stop after the killing of Al-Ayiri, but rather continued and increased to a greater extent than before. Saudi Arabia pursued AQBH members abroad, the first of which was to pressure Omar al-Bashir to extradite 18 people linked to AQBH. Sudan eventually handed over 17 to Saudi Arabia on June 6, 2003, when the Sudanese government arrested them while they were training on the use of weapons in a training camp in the Laqwa area of Kordofan. Internally, on June 14, a chase that began at a checkpoint when the owner of a car refused to stop, and the group inside the car began shooting with AK-47 machine guns, led to an apartment in a building in the Khalidiya neighbourhood in Mecca, in which a cell consisting of 17 AQBH members was hiding. Apartment raid emergency. 5 AQBH members were killed, and 12 members were arrested. The Saudi government announced that it had found bombs, weapons, chemicals, and explosive devices in the cell that was planning to carry out a specific terrorist attack in the Mecca region.

On June 23, King Fahd bin Abdulaziz Al Saud offered to reduce the punishment for those wanted by the security services who declare their repentance within a month. This decision caused a strong shock to the organization, as many leaders and members defected from the ranks of AQBH, and surrendered themselves to the Ministry of Interior, most notably Ali Abdul Rahman Al-Faqaisi، and Mansur ibn Muhammad Ahmad Faqih and Abdullah ibn Atiyah Haziz al-Salmi،

On July 1, 2003, Interior Minister Prince Nayef bin Abdulaziz Al Saud announced in his speech before the Shura Council that the total number of those arrested was 124 people linked to AQBH. On the same day, the wanted security officer, Dhafer bin Abdul Rahman bin Abdullah Al-Maqar Al-Shehri, surrendered himself to the Public Security Forces after a three-day chase, and 50 AK-47 machine guns and other materials were found in the house where he was hiding in Al-Namas in the Asir region.

Three days after the Minister of Interior, Prince Nayef bin Abdulaziz Al Saud, announced the death toll of those arrested, 4 wanted persons committed suicide by blowing up their bodies inside a mosque in a village in the Al-Jawf region, and the wanted persons took the initiative to open fire on the security men while they were surrounded in the mosque, namely Turki Al-Dandani and Abdul Rahman Jabara, who is Kuwaiti, Rajeh Al-Ajmi, who is Kuwaiti, and Amash Al-Subaie, while Musaed Al-Ruwaili, the imam of the mosque, surrendered himself to the security authorities، Security personnel also arrested 3 people who intended to smuggle wanted persons out of Saudi Arabia.

On July 21, the Ministry of Interior announced the thwarting of terrorist operations that were prepared to be carried out by extremist cells in Riyadh, Qassim, and the Eastern Province, led by about 15 people, who used the ground in homes, farms, and rest houses to store chemical mixtures for manufacturing explosives weighing 20.7 tons, and 18 RPG shells.

July 28, in the Qassim region, public security forces surrounded a farm in the town of Ghadi in the city of Uyun al-Jawa, where six wanted persons were present, where the six people opened fire on security personnel using hand grenades, resulting in the arrest of four other people who harbored members of AQBH and resulted in The attack resulted in the killing of 6 AQBH members, four Saudis and two Chadians, the wounding of another, and the seizure of a number of weapons and ammunition، 3 wanted persons were arrested in Jabal Saq near the city of Buraidah without resistance. On August 7, Public Security forces thwarted an attempt to blow up a company specialized in the cement industry in the Qassim region, and a person was arrested inside his residence in the factory in possession of bombs and dynamite that he hid in the residence's air conditioner. Public Security forces also arrested three wanted persons in the deserts northeast of the Shari center in the Qassim region because of their relationship with the Ghadi farm cell.

On August 10, 2003, a number of wanted persons fled in front of a security checkpoint on the Riyadh – Al-Qassim Road, using their weapons on security personnel, and headed towards a rest house in the Al-Amana neighbourhood, which was a shelter for a number of Al-Qaeda members, and public security forces found hand grenades inside the rest house, RPG shells, and weapons. Two days later, Public Security forces arrested 4 wanted persons, during a raid by the security services on a house in the Al-Suwaidi neighbourhood.

On August 15, security forces arrested about 21 people without resistance, 11 Saudis and 10 Bangladeshis, and some Bangladeshis were later released, who were residing in a residential building in the village of Karbous overlooking the Yemeni border in Jizan, in possession of weapons, missiles ready to be launched, and 170 RPG shells. Eight days later, the Public Security Forces were able to kill Sultan Gibran Sultan Al-Qahtani, one of the most prominent leaders of al-Qaeda, Turki Al-Qahtani and Khaled Al-Shehri, who opened fire on security patrols that were surrounding an apartment in the residence of King Fahd Central Hospital in Jazan, and two surrendered themselves to the security authorities. The site of the raid on King Fahd Hospital in Jazan is located 11 kilometres from the site of the previous security raid on the village of Karbous.

On August 26, the Ministry of Interior found a fleeing car carrying surveillance equipment, weapons, and explosive materials, and on the same day in Al-Qunfudhah, it seized a car transported via a car designated for transporting cars, containing 70 RPG shells, and the house from which the car was transported was searched in the village of Al-Karbous in Jazan and found It contains 93 RPG shells, hand grenades, and AK-47 machine guns. Also on the same day, hundreds of AK-47 machine guns were found in a house in the village of Al-Zima in Mecca, and at the bottom of Jabal Al-Nour thousands of ammunition were found, and in Wadi Umair 14 AK-47 machine guns and pistols were found.

On September 17, 2003, the Yemeni government handed over 8 wanted detainees to the General Investigation Department accused of involvement in terrorism and their connection to al-Qaeda in Saudi Arabia, including Bandar bin Abdul Rahman Al-Ghamdi, and the Saudi government also received from the Yemeni government the bodies of two wanted persons.

In October 2003, the Ministry of Interior announced on October 8 that security teams had cordoned off a desert area east of Riyadh and arrested 3 wanted persons in possession of weapons. In the Qassim region, a cell containing 4 people was uncovered, and one of them was arrested, and when the security teams went to a farm where they were hiding in the Al-Malida center in the Qassim region, they fled from it, after wounding two officers, two soldiers, and a citizen. Two days later, the Ministry of Interior found a car belonging to three wanted persons near Buraidah in the Qassim region, after they fled from security two days ago. Ten days later, the Ministry of Interior announced a raid on a commercial store in the Al-Suwaidi neighborhood in Riyadh, where it found 3 kilograms of explosives and thousands of gunshots. Two houses and a farm were raided in the Tamir Center in Al Majmaah Governorate, and hand grenades, AK-47 machine guns, pistols, and thousands of bullets were found in them. In a village in Mecca, hand grenades, AK-47 machine guns, and thousands of bullets were found, and in the Labkha Center in Shaqra Governorate, AK-47 machine guns and thousands of bullets were found, and in a house in Jeddah, AK-47 machine guns and thousands of bullets were found، Hand grenades, and hundreds of gunshots. In a well in the Al-Bukayriyah Desert in the Qassim region, a group of materials prepared for explosives were found.

On November 2, 2003, in the Al-Sharay'a neighborhood in Mecca, the Public Security Forces were able to thwart a terrorist operation that was prepared for bombing, which resulted in the killing of two terrorists after they attempted to escape in two cars, but they were disabled and killed, and five were arrested, and one day later a wanted man surrendered to the security men after He threatened to blow himself up with a bomb in the same location.

AQBH planned to launch a massive operation similar to the Riyadh bombings, and the Al-Muhaya complex was chosen because they believed that the residents of this complex were foreigners, especially non-Muslims, and on November 8, 2003, members of the Al-Qaeda group attacked the Al-Muhaya residential complex, which is inhabited by thousands of Arab communities in the west of the capital, Riyadh, with a car. Bomb. The toll of this attack was 18 dead and 122 wounded. The attackers were divided into 3 sections: a suicide section consisting of two people riding in a car that was camouflaged by being painted with the logo of the Royal Saudi Land Forces and the Special Emergency Forces، A storming section was tasked with attacking the guards of the residential complex by shooting and throwing hand grenades in order to facilitate the task of the suicide bombers' car, and a third section climbed one of the mountains and heights overlooking the residential complex, and its mission was to bomb the residential complex with an RPG to distract and distract the complex's guards from the car in which the suicide bombers were traveling.

AQBH then tried to carry out a major operation again, but it was thwarted by the Public Security Forces on November 25, which coincided with the night of Eid al-Fitr at the time. The wanted persons were pursued in the Al-Sulay neighborhood, east of Riyadh, resulting in the killing of one of the gunmen, Abdul Mohsen Al-Shabanat, and the suicide of the second by blowing himself up with a grenade, who was Assistant Al-Subaie. Inside the rest house, a transport vehicle was seized that was camouflaged in the color of Royal Saudi Land Forces vehicles, and an iron tank containing explosive materials and 3 RPG shells was placed inside it. The next day, Public Security forces arrested an AQBH member who participated in the bombing that occurred in the Al-Muhaya complex in Riyadh, where his hiding place was determined, and a SAM 7 missile, an RPG, hand grenades, explosives, and RDX materials were found with him. And weapons and ammunition.

The noose on AQBH tightened, and they lost support and funding, and they lost their money, weapons, and many of their members in pre-emptive operations carried out by the Public Security Forces, and frustration spread among the ranks of AQBH due to their inability to carry out specific operations due to the security forces' frustration with them, and the infrastructure of AQBH began to collapse Gradually, the situation worsened in Al-Qaeda after the Saudi government allocated financial rewards for their arrest، On December 6, 2003, the Ministry of Interior announced a list of 26 wanted persons related to the terrorist events that occurred in Saudi Arabia since March 2003, and allocated financial rewards amounting to one million riyals for anyone who provides information leading to the arrest of a wanted person, and 5 million riyals for anyone who reports a group of Wanted persons, and 7 million riyals for anyone who contributes to thwarting a criminal act، AQBH faced a critical situation after the state allocated financial rewards for their arrest A day after the announcement of the security list, Public Security forces imposed a siege in the Al-Namar neighborhood in the Al-Suwaidi area, south of Riyadh. After the General Investigation Service received information from a citizen that the wanted person, Ibrahim Al-Rayes, had a villa in the neighborhood, the General Investigation Service monitored the villa. When he left in his car to a tire repair shop at a gas station behind the villa located on the main street, a security forces patrol followed him. At the workshop, the wanted man discovered the presence of members of the Public Security Forces, so he opened fire on them. He was killed during the confrontations.

== Later activities ==
AQBH decided to take revenge on the Public Security Forces. However, in addition to making them visible, harming the Public Security Forces violates the principle upon which AQBH was founded, which is to defend Muslims and protect them from non-Muslims since members of the Saudi forces embrace the Islamic religion. With the appearance of a criminal who does not differentiate between a Muslim and a non-Muslim, then AQBH would lose what remained of its supporters. Therefore, AQBH formed a fictitious organization that does not exist on the ground and called it the "Al-Haramain Brigades" in order to shift the responsibility for targeting the Saudi government's security agencies and those who embrace the Islamic religion away from Al-Qaeda. AQBH claimed in the media that there is no relationship in between them and the Al-Haramain Brigades.

Al-Qaeda's first operations under the name of the Al-Haramain Brigades took place on December 4, 2003, when heavy fire was fired at the General Investigations Commander, Abdulaziz bin Muhammad Al-Huwayrini, while he was riding in his car with his brother. His brother was seriously injured and he later died as a result of the injury, and he also suffered injuries to his hand. and his face, but his injuries were not critical. He was also targeted again with an explosive device targeting his car, but he survived and was not injured. Then the Al-Haramain Brigades tried to target the General Investigation headquarters with a vehicle that was booby-trapped with high-explosive explosive devices, but the operation failed after the explosive devices were dismantled. Then the Al-Haramain Brigades tried to target General Investigation Officer Ibrahim Al-Dali, east of Riyadh, with highly explosive explosive devices placed under his Lexus car, but he survived and was not injured. The Al-Haramain Brigades continued to target security men, and the most prominent targeting operations with explosives included the killing of a policeman in a store in Jeddah, the killing of two policemen at a checkpoint in Jeddah, and the killing of four road security patrolmen on the Riyadh Al-Qassim road in two locations near the Umm Sidra Center, and the security forces seized two car bombs. A policeman was killed in Al-Uyaynah, a group of police officers were wounded in Buraidah, and two policemen were killed in the city of Taif. On December 31, 2003, an attempt was made to assassinate Lieutenant Colonel Ibrahim Al-Dhalea from the General Investigations Department.

AQBH believed that targeting the security services of the Saudi government would reduce the campaigns and raids and would give them the opportunity to reorganize their ranks. However, exactly the opposite happened. The public security forces continued to search for cells affiliated with Al-Qaeda. During their search, they found, on February 22, 2004, the body of an AQBH member. He is Amer bin Mohsen Al-Shehri in the Benban desert area, after his companions left him there. He died from an injury after being injured during an exchange of fire on December 23, 2003. According to the Ministry of Interior's investigation, Amer bin Mohsen Al-Shehri's injuries were represented by a gunshot wound that caused a penetrating wound on the left side. Under the rib cage and out of the abdomen, in addition to another injury to the right hand, which caused him to bleed externally and internally. He was transferred by them to a room that was isolated with cork sheets so that no one would hear his groans. He was denied food and drink except for some liquids, and he was treated with various means. His condition was primitive, as his condition worsened until the wound appeared to septic and his weight decreased sharply, then he entered a stage of delirium, and when his condition reached that stage, some of them suggested handing him over to his family, but the influential people among them refused that, and the situation continued like this until he died, when a grave was dug for him. Outside the Riyadh region, he was buried by them using pieces of wood, and the grave was leveled with the ground so that no one could recognize it. At the intersection of Abdul Rahman bin Awf Street and Imam Ahmed bin Hanbal Street in the Al-Naseem neighborhood, west of Riyadh. As soon as he saw the Public Security forces, he opened fire on them, refusing to surrender himself. This was then followed by an exchange of fire with the Public Security forces, which led to For his death and the killing of his companion, Ibrahim bin Abdul Aziz bin Muhammad Al-Muzaini, Weapons, explosives and hand grenades were found inside the car. Abdulaziz Al-Muqrin became the leader of AQBH.

The Saudi government continued its raid operations, the most notable of which was on April 5, 2004, when the Public Security forces were able to kill an AQBH member and arrest another after he was wounded in the Al-Rawdah neighborhood in Riyadh, after they opened fire on the security men, and they responded in kind. They were: Abdul Rahman Al-Sahli. And Abdullah Al-Sahli. Seven days later, Public Security forces clashed with a number of AQBH members in a house in the Al-Fayhaa neighborhood, east of Riyadh. Through this, they were able to kill one of them, the wanted man Khaled Al-Sabeet, and wound two of them, Rakan Al-Saykhan and Nasser Al-Rashed. They later died as a result of the lack of adequate health care, after Al-Qaeda cut the leg of Nasser Al-Rashed, who was injured in a confrontation with security forces, with an electric saw after it became severely inflamed and developed into a state of gangrene, and Rakan Al-Saykhan bled until he died. All of them were on the list of 26, and a group of them who were in the house escaped, killing a security man named Ghadeer Al-Qahtani and wounding four others.

The largest attempt to target the Public Security Forces occurred on April 21, when Abdulaziz Al-Madheish and Muhammad Al-Farraj, two members of AQBH, attempted to target the Public Security Departments Complex in the Al-Washm neighborhood in Riyadh. The plan was to forcefully enter the building through the gate and then blow it up to cause the greatest possible damage, but the plan was The plan failed because they were prevented by public security forces, so they were forced to go to the side wall of the building and explode the car. This destruction left 11 dead and more than 200 soldiers injured. Less than forty-eight hours after the bombing of the Public Security Departments Complex in the Al-Washm neighborhood in Riyadh, Public Security forces killed three members of AQBH in a residential building in the Al-Safa neighborhood in Jeddah: Ahmed Al-Fadhli, Khaled Al-Qurashi, and Mustafa Al-Mubaraki, and a fourth blew himself up with a belt. Nassif, after the noose tightened around him, was Talal Al-Anbari, the leader of the Hejaz cell founded by Abdul Aziz Al-Muqrin.

Then Al-Qaeda attempted to carry out two simultaneous operations against security institutions. The first targeted the headquarters of the Saudi Ministry of Interior in Riyadh, with a suicide bomber detonating a car bomb several meters away from a tunnel near the eastern wall of the ministry building. The car bomb then exploded due to the explosives it contained after the suicide bomber failed to reach the building, the suicide bomber was killed and one security man was wounded. The second operation targeted the headquarters of the Special Emergency Forces Training Center in Riyadh, through two suicide bombers who tried to blow up a car near the center, before the security authorities blew them up before the car entered the center's headquarters. The operation failed and the two suicide bombers were killed and no security man was killed.

Targeting the security men did not achieve the desired results, but rather distorted the image of Al-Qaeda more and more and increased the Saudi government's determination to eliminate the organization. Then the leader of Al-Qaeda, Abdul Aziz Al-Muqrin, decided to follow a new strategy, which was to shift from targeting the security men to targeting non-Muslim Westerners, in order to embarrass Saudi Arabia in front of them. The world and forcing foreign countries not to cooperate with Saudi Arabia for the safety of their citizens residing on Saudi territory. The first operation to follow this new strategy was on May 1, 2004, when 4 members of Al-Qaeda attacked the headquarters of the Swiss electrical equipment company ABB in the industrial city of Yanbu, resulting in the death of 7 people, six Westerners, a soldier from the National Guard, and all the attackers.

Then, a German citizen named Dunkel Hermann was killed in Riyadh, in the Al-Hamra neighborhood, in front of a branch of the Arab National Bank, with five bullets. Journalist Frank Gardner and his colleague, Irish photographer Simon Cumbers, were attacked in the city of Riyadh. The attack claimed the life of Simon Cumbers, and Gardner was paralyzed in his legs. Then, an American resident named Robert Jacob was killed after they tried to enter his house in the Al-Malaz neighborhood in Riyadh. Then another American resident, Kenneth Scrouse, was killed in the Al-Malaz neighborhood in Riyadh. French resident Laurent Barbeau was killed in Jeddah. The Irish resident, engineer Anthony Christopher Higgins, was killed in his office in Riyadh. British Resident Edward Muirhead-Smith was killed in a parking garage outside a shopping center in Riyadh. The largest kidnapping and assassination operations carried out by Al-Qaeda was the kidnapping of American resident Paul Johnson as a hostage, while he was returning to a residential complex in which he lived. Members of Al-Qaeda had kidnapped him after setting up a fake checkpoint next to the wall of Imam Muhammad bin Saud University in Riyadh, and offered to the Saudi government to remove the members. Al-Qaeda was released from prisons in exchange for the release of Paul Johnson, but the offer was rejected by the Saudi government. Al-Qaeda members beheaded the hostage 72 hours after his kidnapping was announced online.

Security forces found Johnson's body in the Al-Munsiyah neighborhood, east of Riyadh. On May 21, 2004, security forces spotted an Al-Qaeda cell in one of the rest houses in the Khudaira area of the city of Buraidah in the Qassim region. The cell was planning a suicide operation against foreign targets. The security forces clashed with the cell's followers, resulting in the killing of four wanted persons and the serious injury of a fifth.

Al-Qaeda's largest attack against Westerners was on May 29, 2004, when Al-Qaeda targeted the headquarters of the American Hilburton Oil Company and the Al-Hizam complex, and killed 22 people, the vast majority of whom were Westerners. Then Al-Qaeda tried to carry out another massive operation against Westerners, and the American consulate in Jeddah was chosen. Five armed members of Al-Qaeda stormed it and killed 5 non-American employees or contractors at the consulate. Public Security forces killed 3 of them, wounded two of them, and were arrested.

The Public Security Forces dealt two fatal blows to Al-Qaeda, the first on June 18, 2004, when they killed the third leader of Al-Qaeda in the Arabian Peninsula, Abdul Aziz Al-Muqrin, and his right-hand man, Faisal Al-Dakhil, as well as Turki Al-Mutayri and Ibrahim Al-Durahim, while their presence was monitored at a gas station in the Al-Malaz neighborhood in central... Riyadh, and 12 people suspected of being linked to these incidents were arrested. Abdul Aziz Al-Muqrin was the last skilled and competent leader of Al-Qaeda. With his death, Al-Qaeda collapsed, and all the leaders who came after him were unable to preserve the entity of the organization, or rebuild it. The second was when, on July 20, 2004, Public Security forces raided a house in Riyadh that turned out to be the actual headquarters of Al-Qaeda and its media production center. Public Security forces found documents, computers, and video tapes in the hostel. These finds enabled investigators to track down most of the remnants of AQBH, and this discovery broke the back of AQBH. The Saudi security forces then prevailed in favor of Al-Qaeda, and the reason was due to the information found at Al-Qaeda's headquarters, and to the information obtained by investigators from Al-Qaeda members detained in Saudi government prisons. This information enabled the security institutions to determine the identities of a large number of the organization's members. Throughout the regions of Saudi Arabia.

After that, the remaining most prominent members of Al-Qaeda began to gradually fall into the hands of the security forces, the first of which was when six of the wanted persons surrendered themselves to the security forces after King Fahd bin Abdulaziz Al Saud announced again the opening of the door to amnesty and return to justice for anyone who committed a crime in the name of religion. Al-Qaeda members. The royal pardon given by the then Crown Prince, Prince Abdullah bin Abdulaziz, was limited to one month from the date of its announcement. Then the killing of Issa Saad Al-Awshan and Mujab Abu Ras Al-Dosari. Then Abd al-Rahman Ubayd Allah al-Harbi was killed. Then Abdullah bin Abdulaziz bin Ahmed Al-Muqrin handed himself over to the security forces. Abdul Majeed Al-Manea, one of Al-Qaeda's ideologues, was then killed. Then Abdulaziz Al-Taweelai Al-Anazi, the media official for AQBH, was arrested.

In early April 2005, a local resident in Al-Rass Governorate informed Public Security Forces after he noticed strange activity on a nearby farm. When the Public Security forces attempted to search the farm on April 3, they were faced with violent armed resistance in a battle that took place for three days, and was the bloodiest in the war campaign against Al-Qaeda. The ferocity of the battle reflected the importance of the place, as the entire leadership of the organization or what was left of it was hiding there, and after they realized They represent the nerve center of the organization, and they fought until the end using their huge weapons arsenal. When the battle ended on April 5, it became clear that 14 members of Al-Qaeda had been killed, including the two senior leaders: Saud Hamoud Al-Otaibi, the leader of AQBH, and Abdul Karim Al-Majati. Five were wounded, and the Public Security Forces suffered more than a hundred casualties. The Al-Rass incident effectively represented the final nail in the coffin of AQBH, as by that time all militants belonging to Al-Ayiri's original network were either killed or arrested.

Saleh Al-Awfi became the leader of AQBH after the killing of Saud Hamoud Al-Otaibi, but Al-Qaeda during his reign did not carry out specific operations or attacks. Saleh Al-Awfi did not continue to lead Al-Qaeda for long, as he was killed on August 18, 2005, in Medina, where he blew himself up after besieging it. Security men. To succeed him in the leadership of Al-Qaeda, Fahd Al-Jawir, who is considered the last leader of AQBH. During the era of Fahd Al-Jawir, Al-Qaeda did not carry out major attacks or operations, except for one failed operation that occurred on February 24, 2006, when suicide bombers targeted an oil refinery in Abqaiq, affiliated with Aramco in the Eastern Province of Saudi Arabia, where a group of terrorists inside two car bombs camouflaged with the company's logo tried to Saudi Aramco stormed the gates of the Saudi Aramco Company, where the oil refineries and laboratories were located. When the security men at the gates and the security authorities present at the site became suspicious of them, they stopped them and exchanged heavy gunfire with them, which led to the explosion of one of the two cars and the impact of one of the refinery's "boilers." Fahd Al-Jawir did not last long in his position, as he was killed in clashes with security forces in the east of the capital, Riyadh, on February 28, 2006.

The Ministry of Interior announced a new list of 36 security wanted persons, including 15 wanted persons inside Saudi Arabia and 21 abroad. Four days later, wanted person No. 29 from the new list surrendered himself: Fayez Ibrahim Ayoub.

The Public Security Forces continued their raid operations, the most prominent of which was a raid on a house in the Mubarakiya neighborhood in Al-Khobar, in which all the cell members were killed. It took 3 days due to the Public Security Forces' attempt to arrest them alive, and in that incident 9 members of Al-Qaeda were killed. Two simultaneous raids were carried out on two homes in the Al-Rawdah neighborhood, east of Riyadh, during which Younis Muhammad Al-Hayari was killed, and three wanted security men were arrested, one of whom was injured and the other two surrendered to the security men without any resistance. On April 21, the police found a car full of weapons and maps of vital facilities in the eastern region, and on June 23, the police raided an apartment in which members of Al-Qaeda were hiding, as they were planning to target a security institution. In 2007, the Ministry of Interior announced that 701 people were arrested due to suspicions of belonging to Al-Qaeda, but 181 of them were released due to lack of evidence convicting them, and 520 detainees are still languishing in prisons until the charges against them are considered, and that a number of them are accused of planning To carry out criminal acts and launch attacks on oil and economic installations in Saudi Arabia.

== Dissolution ==
After the Saudi government tightened its pursuit of AQBH, Al-Qaeda at the end of 2008 called on AQBH to exile to in Yemen, where the security was much weaker and where they would be able to recover. Al-Qaeda of Saudi Arabia, and Al-Qaeda of Yemen, then merged and formed Al-Qaeda in the Arabian Peninsula in January 2009. Nasser Al-Wahayshi was appointed leader of Al-Qaeda in the Arabian Peninsula.

== Media ==
=== Voice of Jihad ===
Sawt al-Jihad (Voice of Jihad) magazine was a bi-monthly magazine and represents one of the periodicals issued by the International Islamic Media Front, and is classified under the scope of a jihadist magazine. She spoke on behalf of AQBH and spread its ideas, founded by Issa bin Saad Al Awshan, and assumed the editorship and supervision of it until he was killed in a security raid carried out by public security forces in the King Fahd neighborhood in the capital, Riyadh, in 2004. It was the first electronic publication containing instructions for the use of light and heavy weapons, with instructions for performing some exercises, and military medicine in the event that a member of the organization is injured, which enables Al-Qaeda members to treat each other without the need to visit hospitals and health centers. Mujab Al-Dosari and Issa bin Saad Al-Awshan were among the first editors of this magazine, who were killed in a confrontation with security personnel on July 20, 2004. After the killing of Al-Ayiri, Issa bin Saad Al-Awshan, and Mujab Al-Dosari, Al-Qaeda's media activity diminished through Sawt Al-Jihad magazine, until the magazine resumed publication under the supervision of Abdul Aziz Al-Taweelai Al-Anazi, and Al-Anazi was known as Al-Qaeda's Minister of Information for his electronic media activity under the ID «brother of those who obey God», He is one of the figures with whom the Sakinah Campaign entered into dialogues and debates. Voice of Jihad magazine broadcast excerpts from the book «Iraq and the invasion of the Cross», and a short chapter under the title «Issam Al-Qamari and the Battle of Al-Jamaliyya» from the book «Knights Under the Banner of the Prophet» by its author, Ayman al-Zawahiri. The bulletin contained interviews and interviews with members of Al-Qaeda, with data and details of terrorist operations published after they occurred, and it is considered a legitimate view and a news voice for the organization. Most issues of Voice of Jihad bulletins show interviews with some wanted persons, and in the interviews you will find their conversations about their plans and participation in terrorist operations in Saudi Arabia. They also announce in their interviews their positions on the Saudi government, which is often opposed to it. Saud Hamoud Obaid Al-Qatini Al-Otaibi was considered the leader of AQBH and one of the organization's ideologues, he frequently participates in Sawt Al-Jihad magazine. As he is responsible for preparing reports and press releases for the organization, as he was entrusted with the task of managing the media battle, and Abu Azzam Al-Ansari, an Egyptian national, is the editor-in-chief of Sawt Al-Jihad magazine, and the Saudi government arrested him in June 2007 in Medina.

=== Al-Battar Camp ===
A purely military magazine, issued by AQBH, that works to provide military courses in dealing with weapons and methods of carrying out operations of all kinds, and is also concerned with establishing field cells, publishing information and reports from the most prominent military tactics, and carrying out field operations without relying on the presence of a field military commander and this. The magazine was issued for a strategic dimension, which is to train future generations and new sympathizers to confront and continue terrorist acts. It was founded by the first leader of AQBH, Al-Ayiri, and the name of the magazine "Al-Battar" was chosen from the nickname Al-Ayiri.

=== Al-Khansaa ===
It is a monthly electronic magazine dedicated to women, called Al-Khansaa, and is issued by the Women's Media Office in the Arabian Peninsula. It was launched by AQBH in 2004, to be its arm in dealing with women who support or are involved in Al-Qaeda activities. The magazine's primary goal is to guide women on how to combine jihad with fighting and practicing daily life as a woman. The magazine's supervisor is Umm Osama, an Egyptian woman who was arrested by the Saudi government for her activity in the women's media arm of the organization, and she admitted that she is the magazine's editor-in-chief. The magazine did not issue more than two issues.

== Notable Members ==
Most wanted	English	Arabic	Notes
	Yousif Saleh Fahd al-'Uyayri (or Ayyiri, etc.)	يوسف صالح فهد العييري	leader, writer, and webmaster, killed June 2003 in Saudi Arabia
3	Khalid Ali bin Ali Hajj	خالد علي بن علي حاج	leader, killed in Riyadh March or April 2004
1	Abdulaziz Issa Abdul-Muhsin al-Muqrin	عبد العزيز عيسى عبد المحسن المقرن	leader, killed in Riyadh 18 June 2004
5	Saleh Muhammad 'Audhuallah al-'Alawi al-Oufi	صالح محمد عوض الله العلوي العوفي	leader, killed 17 or 18 August 2005 in Medina
2	Rakan Muhsin Mohammed al-Saikhan	راكان محسن محمد الصيخان	killed 12 April 2004 in Riyadh
7	Saud Hamoud 'Abid al-Qatini al-'Otaibi	سعود حمود عبيد القطيني العتيبي	senior member, one of 15 killed in a 3-day battle in Ar Rass April 2005
4	Abdul Kareem Al-Majati	عبد الكريم المجاطي	Moroccan, killed with Saud al-Otaibi at Ar Rass, was wanted in the USA under the name Karim El Mejjati
6	Ibrahim Muhammad Abdullah al-Rais	إبراهيم محمد عبدا لله الريس	killed 8 December 2003 in Riyadh
8	Ahmad Abdul-Rahman Saqr al-Fadhli	أحمد عبدالرحمن صقر الفضلي	killed 22 April 2004 in Jeddah
9	Sultan Jubran Sultan al-Qahtani alias Zubayr Al-Rimi	سلطان جبران سلطان القحطاني	q.v., killed 23 September 2003 in Jizan
10	Abdullah Saud Al-Siba'i	عبد الله سعود السباعي	killed 29 December 2004
11	Faisal Abdul-Rahman Abdullah al-Dakhil	فيصل عبدالرحمن عبدالله الدخيل	killed with al-Muqrin
12	Faris al-Zahrani	فارس آل شويل الزهراني	ideologue, captured 5 August 2004 in Abha
13	Khalid Mobarak Habeeb-Allah al-Qurashi	خالد مبارك حبيب الله القرشي	killed 22 April 2004 in Jeddah
14	Mansoor Muhammad Ahmad Faqeeh	منصور محمد أحمد فقيه	surrendered 30 December 2003 in Najran
15	'Issa Saad Muhammad bin 'Ushan	عيسى سعد محمد بن عوشن	ideologue, killed 20 July 2004 in Riyadh
16	Talib Saud Abdullah Al Talib	طالب سعود عبدالله آل طالب	at large; (last of the original 26)
17	Mustafa Ibrahim Muhammad Mubaraki	مصطفى إبراهيم محمد مباركي	killed 22 April 2004 in Jeddah
18	Abdul-Majiid Mohammed al-Mani'	عبد المجيد محمد المنيع	ideologue, killed 12 October 2004 in Riyadh
19	Nasir Rashid Nasir Al-Rashid	ناصر راشد ناصر الراشد	killed 12 April 2004 in Riyadh
	Sultan bin Bajad Al-Otaibi	سلطان بن بجاد العتيبي	spokesman and writer for al-Qaeda, killed 28 or 29 December 2004
20	Bandar Abdul-Rahman Abdullah al-Dakhil	بندر عبدالرحمن عبدالله الدخيل	killed December 2004
21	Othman Hadi Al Maqboul Almardy al-'Amari	عثمان هادي آل مقبول العمري	recanted, under an amnesty deal, 28 June 2004 in Namas
22	Talal A'nbar Ahmad 'Anbari	طلال عنبر أحمد عنبري	killed 22 April 2004 in Jeddah
23	'Amir Muhsin Moreef Al Zaidan Al-Shihri	عامر محسن مريف آل زيدان الشهري	killed 6 November 2003 in Riyadh
24	Abdullah Muhammad Rashid al-Rashoud	عبد الله محمد راشد الرشود	q.v., ideologue, killed May or June 2005 in Iraq
25	Abdulrahman Mohammad Mohammad Yazji	عبدالرحمن محمد محمد يازجي	killed 6 April 2005
26	Hosain Mohammad Alhasaki	حسين محمد الحسكي	Moroccan, held in Belgium
	Turki N. M. al-Dandani	تركي ناصر مشعل الدندني	cell leader, a former # 1 most wanted, died by suicide July 2003 in al-Jawf
	Ibrahim bin Abdul-Aziz bin Muhammad al-Muzaini	إبراهيم بن عبد العزيز بن محمد المزين	killed with Khalid Ali Hajj
	Abdul-Rahman Mohammed Jubran al-Yazji	عبدالكريم محمد جبران اليازجي	killed 2 June 2004 in Ta'if
	Mohammed Othman Abdullah al-Waleedi al-Shuhri	محمد عثمان عبدالله الوليدي الشهري	
	Mansour Faqeeh	منصور فقيه	surrendered
	Hamid Fahd Abdullah al-Salmi al-Shamri	حمد فهد عبدالله الأسلمي الشمري	
	Ahmad Nasser Abdullah al-Dakhil	أحمد ناصر عبدالله الدخيل	(dead)
	Turki bin Fuheid al-Mutairi a/k/a Fawaz al-Nashimi	تركي بن فيهد المطيري	killed with al-Muqrin
	Jubran Ali Hakmi	جبران علي حكمي	
	Hani Said Ahmed Abdul-Karim al-Ghamdi	هاني سعيد أحمد عبد الكريم الغامدي	
	Ali Abdul-Rahman al-Ghamdi	علي عبد الرحمن الغامدي	surrendered 26 June 2003
	Bandar bin Abdul-Rahman al-Ghamdi	بندر عبد الرحمن الغامدي	captured September 2003 in Yemen and extradited to KSA
	Fawaz Yahya al-Rabi'i	فواز يحيى الربيعي	q.v., killed 1 October 2006 in Yemen
	Abdul-Rahman Mansur Jabarah	عبدالرحمن منصور جبارة	"Canadian-Kuwaiti of Iraqi origin", dead according to al-Qaeda; brother of Kuwaiti-Canadian Mohamed Mansour Jabarah
	Adnan bin Abdullah al-Omari		captured somewhere outside KSA, extradited to KSA November 2005
	Abdul-Rahman al-Mutib		killed in al Qasim December 2005
	Muhammad bin Abdul-Rahman al-Suwailmi, alias Abu Mus'ab al-Najdi	محمد بن عبد الرحمن السويلمي	killed in al Qasim December 2005
According to Saudi authorities, these 12 died or were killed while committing the Riyadh compound bombings on 12 May 2003. Several were previously wanted.
	Khaled Mohammad Muslim Al-Juhani	خالد محمد مسلم الجهني	leader of this group
	Abdul-Karim Mohammed Jubran Yazji	عبد الكريم محمد جبران اليازجي	
	Mohammed Othman Abdullah Al-Walidi Al-Shehri	ومحمد عثمان عبد الله الوليدي الشهري	
	Hani Saeed Ahmad Al Abdul-Karim Al-Ghamdi	هاني سعيد أحمد عبد الكريم الغامدي	
	Jubran Ali Ahmad Hakami Khabrani	جبران علي أحمد حكمي خبراني	
	Khaled bin Ibrahim Mahmoud	خالد بن إبراهيم محمود	called "Baghdadi"
	Mehmas bin Mohammed Mehmas Al-Hawashleh Al-Dosari	محماس بن محمد محماس الهواشلة الدوسري	
	Mohammed bin Shadhaf Ali Al-Mahzoum Al-Shehri	محمد بن شظاف علي آل محزوم الشهري	
	Hazem Mohammed Saeed	حازم محمد سعيد	called "Kashmiri"
	Majed Abdullah Sa'ad bin Okail	ماجد عبدالله سعد بن عكيل	
	Bandar bin Abdul-Rahman Menawer Al-Rahimi Al-Mutairi	بندر بن عبد الرحمن منور الرحيمي المطيري	
	Abdullah Farres bin Jufain Al-Rahimi Al-Mutairi	عبدالله فارس بن جفين الرحيمي المطيري	
	Abdullah Hassan Al Aseery	عبد الله حسن عسيري	Died trying to assassinate a Saudi prince in October 2009.
The following five were reported killed in Dammam in early September 2005.
	Zaid Saad Zaid al-Samari		a former most wanted, killed by Saudi forces in 2005
	Saleh Mansour Mohsen al-Fereidi al-Harbi		
	Sultan Saleh Hussan al-Haseri		
	Naif Farhan Jalal al-Jehaishi al-Shammari		
	Mohammed Abdul-Rahman Mohammed al-Suwailmi		
