= Response of Saudi Arabia to the Islamic State =

The response of Saudi Arabia to the Islamic State has taken many forms. For example, Saudi government agencies have worked with the United States since late 2014 to train and equip Syrian fighters hoping to engage with Islamic State of Iraq and the Levant (ISIL) militants. The challenges of dealing with ISIL is complicated by the fact that around 2,500 militants originally from Saudi territory have left for Syria in order to join ISIL, the destabilization created by the Syrian Civil War having a big effect on the region.

The Saudi people have suffered attacks at the hands of ISIL agents, such as the August 2015 mosque bombing in the Asir area that killed fifteen people and injured nine.

== Background and details ==
Also known by varying names such as the "Islamic State" or the "Islamic State of Iraq and Syria" (ISIS), ISIL has an international reputation for brutality and violence, their actions including beheadings and floggings as well as bans on all kinds of perceived un-Islamic behaviors. A campaign of genocide against the Yazidis and set of massacres done in the wake of militant victories have also brought the group widespread condemnation. Muslim religious leaders such as Egypt's grand mufti have condemned the organization, arguing that its actions go against Islam, and leaders both within (such as Iraqi Kurdistan President Masoud Barzani) and outside (such as U.S. President Barack Obama) the Arab world have vowed to destroy the militants.

According to The Washington Post in 2014, around 2,500 militants originally from Saudi territory have left for Syria in order to join ISIL, this move being a part of the general destabilization created by the Syrian Civil War on the region. In September 2014, U.S. Secretary of State John Kerry met with then Saudi Foreign Minister Prince Saud al-Faisal in the city of Jeddah to discuss ISIL militant battles and related issues. Al-Faisal commented that his nation has "always taken initiatives with regard to a firm position towards terrorists and against them", and he also stated that "there is no limit to what the Kingdom can provide in this regard."

Specific anti-ISIL efforts include Saudi government collaboration since late 2014 with the U.S. to train and equip Syrian fighters hoping to combat ISIL militants. The government has also created a television series titled Security of the Kingdom designed to combat ISIL propaganda while promoting the Saudi perspective on security issues, aiming to foster patriotism. Television figure Mohsin Shaikh Al Hassan stated that he wanted to be "initially concentrating on children in kindergarten" in order to "teach them to love their own country".

The connection between ISIL's campaigns and hard-line Islam more generally in nations such as Saudi Arabia has brought commentary from a variety of journalists and columnists. For example, CNN reporter Elise Labott has asked Kerry about Saudi state support for an arch-conservative version of Islam in the form of Wahhabism. Kerry has responded that the Saudi government's counter-terrorism actions have considerably helped, such as by cutting off money flows to terrorist groups.

== ISIL attacks against Saudis ==
In May 2015, Qatif and Dammam mosque bombings, claimed the lives of over 25 Saudi Shia Muslims, and 106 wounded.

An August 2015 attack by an ISIL-related suicide bomber murdered fifteen people and injured nine more at a mosque inside a Saudi special forces headquarters. An Interior Ministry spokesman stated that the militant attacked the Asir area complex during the traditional noon prayers. Saudi political analyst Jamal Khashoggi remarked that the attack could be the largest anti-Saudi action done by ISIL yet, with Kashoggi remarking that "this is shaking us to the ground."

In July 2015, a police raid in the city of Taif ended in policeman being gunned down. According to Saudi authorities, three people were arrested while flags of the ISIL group were found. That same month, a car bomb attack upon a security checkpoint in Riyadh, the nation's capital city, wounded two policemen. The driver perished in the explosion. The attack is believed to be connected to ISIL.

On March 9. 2017, an Islamic State group member attacked and killed a police officer, and was shot dead by Saudi police afterwards.

== Allegations of sponsorship ==
It has frequently been pointed out that despite these conflicts between the Saudi government and ISIL, the country's religious establishment follows the same ideology, Wahhabism, that ISIL is based on. Allegations of Saudi funding of ISIL have cited an anonymous briefing forwarded to John Podesta by former Secretary of State Hillary Clinton on 17 August 2014 which includes: "We need to use our diplomatic and more traditional intelligence assets to bring pressure on the governments of Qatar and Saudi Arabia, which are providing clandestine financial and logistic support to Isis and other radical Sunni groups in the region." However it has been pointed out that this memo was probably written by Sidney Blumenthal and doesn't necessarily reflect the views of the U.S. government or Hillary Clinton.

== See also ==
- Combined Joint Task Force – Operation Inherent Resolve
- Foreign relations of Saudi Arabia
- Iran and ISIL
- List of militant incidents in Saudi Arabia
- Military intervention against ISIL
- Politics of Saudi Arabia
- Terrorism in Saudi Arabia
- Timeline of ISIL related events
- United Kingdom and ISIL
