= IslamOnline =

Islamic website

- Website type: Religious/Culture
- Available in: Arabic, English
- Owner: Al-Balagh Cultural Society
- Revenue: A nonprofit organization
- Website: islamonline.net
- Commercial: No
- Launched: 24 June 1997

IslamOnline is a global Islamic website on the Internet providing services to Muslims and non-Muslims in several languages. Its motto is "credibility and distinction". It was founded by Yusuf al-Qaradawi.

== Contents ==
The website consists of forums on various issues, such as Books, new Muslims and entertainment, as well as other interactive venues, such as an "Ask the Scholar" section, where visitors can post questions regarding Islam. The Arabic and English sections are tailored to appeal to their respective audiences.

In the four years from 2000 to 2003, around 306,691 materials were published, 233,223 of which were in Arabic while 73,486 were in English.

== Staff ==
The IslamOnline administrative office is located in Doha, Qatar. Its content is managed by the Al-Balagh Cultural Society.

== See also ==
- Imams Online
- Voice of Jihad
