= Fahd Faraj al-Juwair =

Saudi Arabian al-Qaeda member

Fahd Faraj al-Juwair (Arabic: فهد فرج الجوير) (1969 – 28 February 2006) was a high-ranking member of al-Qaeda who was the highest member of that organization in Saudi Arabia at the point of his death.

Juwair was born in the town of al-Zulfi in 1969. He joined al-Qaeda after becoming an adult and began to rise up the ranks of importance. After his predecessor Younis al-Hayari was killed in a shootout in Riyadh Juwair took over as al-Qaeda's leader on the Arabian peninsula.

Juwair was killed 28 February 2006, when he led a failed assault on an oil processing plant in Abqaiq.
