= Imams Online =

- Industry: Non Profit
- Founder: Shaukat Warraich
- Website: www.imamsonline.com

Imams Online is a project of Faith Associates, a global consultancy, that aims to provide a voice for Islamic religious leaders. Imams Online has been involved in counter-extremism work. It is affiliated with Faith Associates which has been linked to the Home Office Research, Information & Communications Unit (RICU).

== Activities and collaborations ==
In 2014, there was a growing concern about home-grown involvement in terrorism with an estimated 500 Britons having left the country to fight in Syria.

In 2015, Imams Online organised a Digital Summit for Imams which was attended by Hamza Yusuf (Co-founder of Zaytuna College) & Abdallah Bin Bayyah. The summit brought together every group within Islam, from Deobandi, Sufi, Sunni, Shia and cultural groups that included Somalis, Pakistanis, Arabs and converts to Islam from many nations.

Imams Online organised and delivered a digital summit in Bradford on 23 January 2016 for Mosque leaders and community activists. The aim of the digital summit was to outline how social media can be used to promote positive messages. Shaukat Warriach, Chief Editor of Imams Online said; "Imams are doing great work but we need to help them communicate in an innovative way to the younger generation".

Imams continued to develop the Digital Summit series in 2017 and 2018 by hosting two interactive events at alongside Google and their HQ and YouTube spaces in London. Most recently, in 2019, Imams Online in partnership with Twitter hosting their 5th Digital Summit event at Twitter spaces in London bringing together Imams, social media activists, community leaders, media personalities and more.

Imams Online has contributed to developing Imams in providing them with the tools to progress in their careers, this has been seen with senior editor of Imam Qari Asim recently being appointed as the independent adviser to the Government to tackle Islamophobia. The role of Imam Qari Asim's work will build on the definitions of Islamophobia currently being considered, including the APPG definition. It will also draw on a wide range of opinions and work in close collaboration with the cross-government Anti-Muslim Hatred Working Group, to ensure that it commands broad support within Muslim communities and wider society.

In 2019, Imams Online worked with Faith Associates to hold a national khutbah (sermon) day to "urge mosque leaders to highlight the issue" of hate crime. This was done as part of Hate Crime Awareness Week.

== Social media partnerships ==
Imams Online have worked closely with Facebook, Google, YouTube and Twitter to tackle hate speech online and improve digital safety.

== Online magazine ==
An online magazine called Haqiqah which means 'the reality' in Arabic was written by British Scholars who wanted to do more in educating young people about the reality of extremists movements. The goal of the magazine was to 'drown out' the voices perpetuating violence. A second edition of the magazine was released to deal with the direct online threat on social media by extremists.

== See also ==
- Islam Online
- Voice of Jihad
