= The One Percent Doctrine =

Nonfiction book by Ron Suskind

- Author: Ron Suskind
- Language: English
- Published: 2006 (Simon & Schuster)
- Publication place: United States
- Pages: 367
- ISBN: 978-0-743-27109-7
- Dewey Decimal: 973.931
- LC Class: HV6432 .S87 2006

The One Percent Doctrine (ISBN 0-7432-7109-2) is a nonfiction book by Pulitzer Prize–winning journalist Ron Suskind about America's hunt for terrorists since September 11, 2001. On July 24, 2006, it reached number 3 on the New York Times Best Seller list.

It assesses the ways in which American counter-terrorism agencies are working to combat terrorist groups. In the narrative, Suskind criticizes the Bush administration for formulating its terrorism policies based on political goals rather than geopolitical realities.

The title comes from a story within the book in which Vice President Dick Cheney describes the Bush administration's doctrine on dealing with terrorism:

If there's a 1% chance that Pakistani scientists are helping al-Qaeda build or develop a nuclear weapon, we have to treat it as a certainty in terms of our response. It's not about our analysis ... It's about our response.

== Summary ==
The One Percent doctrine (also called the Cheney doctrine) was created in November 2001 (no exact date is given) during a briefing given by then-CIA Director George Tenet and an unnamed briefer to U.S. Vice President Dick Cheney and then-National Security Adviser Condoleezza Rice in response to worries that a Pakistani scientist was offering nuclear weapons expertise to Al Qaeda after the September 11th, 2001 terrorist attack. Responding to the thought that Al Qaeda might want to acquire a nuclear weapon, Cheney observed that the U.S. had to confront a new type of threat, a "low-probability, high-impact event" as he described it.

Suskind makes a distinction between two groups engaged in the fight against terrorism: "the notables", those who talk to us about the threat of terrorism (Bush, Cheney, Condoleezza Rice, et al.), and "the invisibles", those who are fighting terrorists (the CIA analysts, the FBI agents and all the other foot soldiers).

The book advances the theory that Abu Zubaydah, a "top operative plotting and planning death and destruction on the United States" as Bush described him, was an insignificant figure.

The book also mentions a plot to attack the 34th Street – Herald Square subway station in New York City in March 2003. But, 45 days before an al-Qaeda cell, who had monitored surveillance of the station, were to release deadly cyanide gas into the tunnels, Ayman al-Zawahiri and other terrorist leaders scrapped the plan because it was not as deadly as the September 11 attacks and therefore was not notable enough to compete with the impact of September 11.

=== New York City Subway plot ===
Richard Clarke told ABC News he was wary of the report about the New York City Subway plot. Clarke stated: "There's reason to be skeptical... Just because something is labeled in an intelligence report does not mean every word in it is true." He said the information describing the plot would have been just one of the hundreds of threats that would have been collected in 2003. According to Clarke, the specificity of the report also made it suspect, stating "Whenever you get reports that are this specific, they are usually made up." Clarke also called into question the notion that Ayman al-Zawahiri called off the attack, adding that he would have been too isolated to have that kind of direct control over a plot inside the United States. He also believed the terrorists would have carried out the attack if the plot was as advanced as Suskind reported, stating, "Frankly if there was a team in the United States that was ready to do this, they would have done it."

An intelligence official who was briefed at the time that the authorities learned of the threat, and who wished to remain anonymous, told The New York Times that some in the intelligence community had been skeptical of the supposed plot, particularly of the idea that the plot had been called off by Mr. al-Zawahiri. The plot was said to have involved the use of a relatively crude device for releasing the chemical gases. "This is a simple cyanide thing, two chemicals mixed together, and it releases cyanide gas ... They'd be lucky if they killed everybody on one car—you can do that with a 9-millimeter pistol ... None of it has been confirmed in three years, who these guys were, whether they in fact had a weapon, or whether they were able to put together a weapon, whether that weapon has been defined and what it would cause or whether they were even in New York," he told the Times.

One former official told CNN that he agreed al-Zawahiri called off the attack but disagreed with Suskind that the terrorists were thwarted within 45 days of carrying it out. Two former officials told CNN the United States was familiar with the design of the gas-dispersal device and had passed the information to state and local officials, but added that the proposed timing of the attack was not as precise as Suskind wrote.

A former CIA official told the New York Daily News that few top U.S. counterterrorism officials knew about the plot and many deny Suskind's claim that a panicky Bush White House sent "alerts through the government." One reason for the lack of alarm, according to the former official, was that soon after discovering al-Qaeda blueprints for a homemade cyanide sprayer, the FBI learned Zawahiri had canceled the attack because "it wasn't big enough." The device was hardly a weapon of mass destruction. "Cyanide is sexy, but difficult to weaponize ... They have fantasies of poisoning a water supply. You can't imagine how difficult that would be. Did they fantasize about a cyanide attack? Most likely," a senior counterterrorism official told the Daily News.

New York Senator Charles Schumer told the Associated Press that while the threat was "serious enough to be taken seriously," the alleged plot was "never corroborated."

Suskind also claimed in the book that the al-Qaeda cell that would have carried out the attack was still in the United States. Intelligence sources, however, told CBS News that, as far as they knew, there were no terrorist cells operating in the U.S. under the command of Zawahiri or bin Laden.

=== Abu Zubaydah ===
A counter-terrorism official who asked not to be named told the Washington Times, "A lot of information [in Suskind's book] is simply wrong." One inaccuracy, this official said, is the book's assertion that Abu Zubaydah, whom the CIA captured in Pakistan in 2002, was not a key al Qaeda figure, and was insane. The counter-terrorism official said Zubaydah is "crazy like a fox" and was a senior planner inside al Qaeda who has provided critical information on how Osama bin Laden's group works.

John McLaughlin, former acting CIA director, has also stated, "I totally disagree with the view that the capture of Abu Zubaydah was unimportant. Abu Zubaydah was woven through all of the intelligence prior to 9/11 that signaled a major attack was coming, and his capture yielded a great deal of important information."

Sources with direct knowledge of Zubaydah's interrogation told the New York Daily News that while they concede Zubaydah knew about ideas but not operations and fed the CIA disinformation, he was lucid and difficult to crack. "He was tough and smart", said an agency veteran.

=== Aimen Dean ===
Aimen Dean, an MI6 spy within Al Qaeda, had his cover blown by the book, which disclosed his identity with details that could only be sourced to Dean.

== See also ==
- Al Qaeda
- Bush Doctrine
- Precautionary Principle
- War on terror
- Weapons of mass destruction
- Mubtakkar
