= Aufi Tower =

Coordinates: 48°35′17″N 9°44′51″E

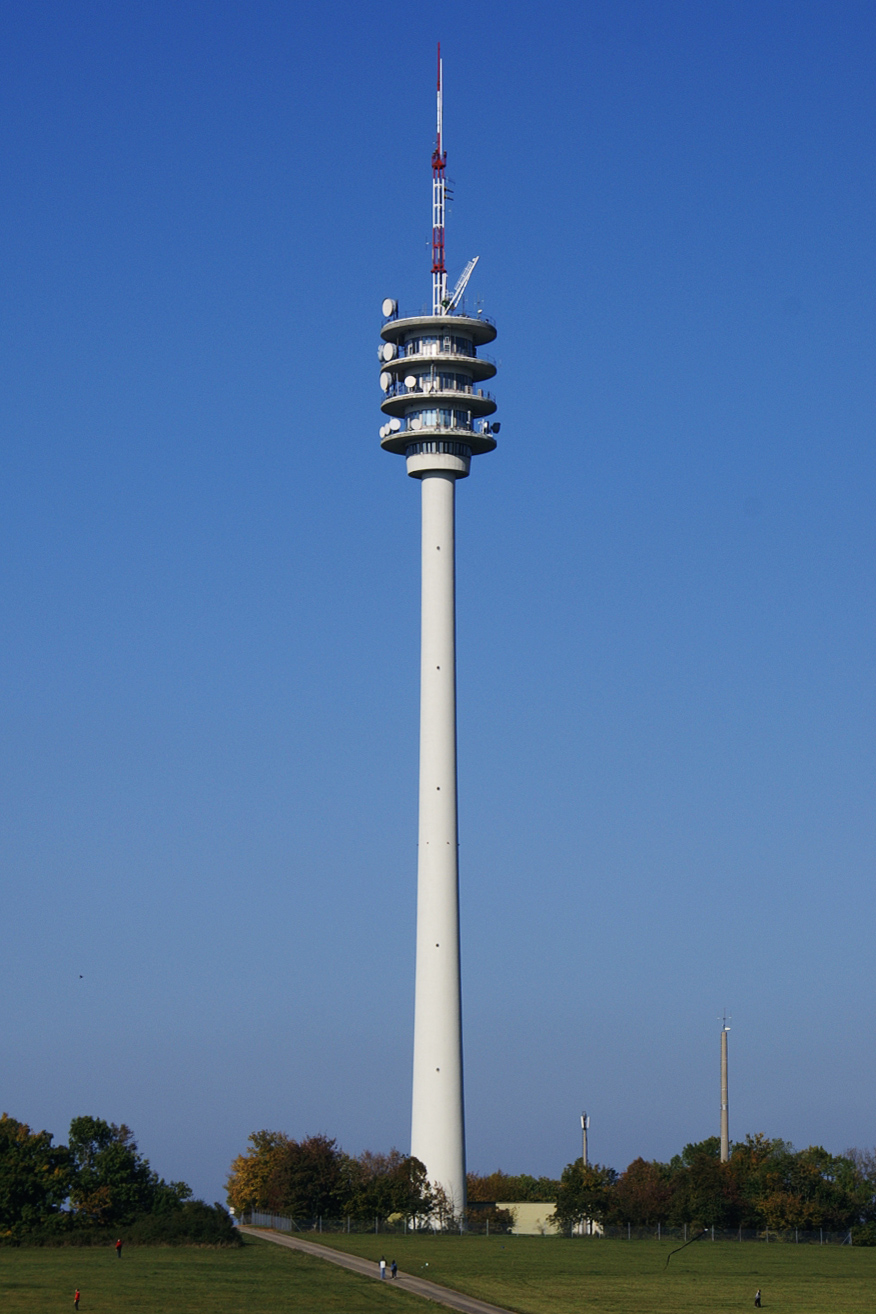
police radio tower in Aufhausen

Aufi or Funkturm Aufhausen is the name of the police radio tower in Aufhausen, Germany (part of Geislingen an der Steige).

The Aufi is a 132-metre-high (433 ft) radio tower in steel and concrete, with a diameter of 6 metres. It is one of the thinnest steel-and-concrete towers in the world. In the 1960s and 70s, measurements of static were made on this tower. It is inaccessible to the public.

== See also ==
- List of towers
