= Al-Nida =

Former al-Qaeda-run website

Alneda (Arabic: النداء) (meaning "the call" in Arabic) is a former al-Qaeda-run website, which was located at: AlNeda.com. It was shut down in 2002.

It was being hosted in Malaysia by the internet service provider Malaysia Technology Development Corporation, and first appeared shortly after the September 11, 2001 Terrorist Attacks. It had encrypted information to direct members to more secure websites, featured news on Al Qaeda, published Fatwas and books, and had media, including videos of Osama bin Laden.

Many attempts were made to shut down in 2002 (mostly through DoS attacks), until one American porn-site owner named Jon Messner finally took control of the website. Messner used the Arabic translation service at ajeeb.com to read messages left on the site. For five days, people thought that it was still the real Al Qaeda site. After a post on an Islamic message board at 4:30 a.m. on July 20 warned people not to go, the site was taken down in a website defacement. After this message Messner posted an image of the Great Seal of the United States with the words, "Hacked, Tracked, and Now Owned by the United States". It is now a link to ItsHappening.com, a website about current events.

The site briefly re-appeared on www.news4arab.org, but it was taken down again.
