= Saleh al-Oufi =

Saleh Muhammad 'Awadullah al-'Alawi al-'Oufi

Leader of Al-Qaeda in the Arabian Peninsula
- Preceded by: Abdel Aziz al-Muqrin

Personal details
- Died: 18 August 2005

Saleh al-Oufi or Saleh Muhammad 'Awadullah al-'Alawi al-'Oufi (Arabic: صالح محمد عوض الله العلوي العوفي) (died 18 August 2005), was a member of al-Qaeda in Saudi Arabia and became the leader of that group when Abdel Aziz al-Muqrin was killed in June 2004. Al-Oufi in turn was killed in August 2005, in Madinah.

== Life ==
al-Oufi was born in al-Hindiya, Saudi Arabia. He was a sergeant in the Prison detachment of the National Service, but was discharged in 1989 for his overt support of anti-government forces.

In 1993, he traveled to Afghanistan; and fought in Bosnia and Chechnya, where he sustained a head wound and returned to Saudi Arabia for medical treatment. Following his recovery, he opened a car dealership and traveled frequently to Germany through Dubai.

In 2001, he was back in Afghanistan, but fled the American invasion along with Khalid al-Juhani. In 2002, he returned to Saudi Arabia for his father's funeral, which he attended disguised as a woman.

== Leadership ==
During his 14 months as leader of AQAP, Al-Oufi wrote a few pieces for the al-Qaida online magazines Sawt al-Jihad and Mu'askar al-Battar, particularly about Iraq. A car bombing in Qatar, which killed one and wounded dozens, came two days after an instigation by al-Oufi (on a terrorist web forum) to attack "crusader" targets in the Gulf nations.

Al-Oufi has been variously described as a former policeman and a former prison guard. According to AQAP, he participated in some way in the fighting in Afghanistan.

== Death ==
One other suspect with al-Oufi was killed, and another wounded and captured. In a simultaneous raid in Riyadh, four AQAP members were killed and one captured. These raids were made possible by the interception of mobile telephone transmissions.
