= Khaled Ali Hajj =

Alleged leader of Al-Qaeda

Leader Khalid Ali bin-Ali al-Hajj

Leader of Al-Qaeda in the Arabian Peninsula
- Preceded by: Yusef al-Ayeri
- Succeeded by: Abdel Aziz al-Muqrin

Personal details
- Born: 1973
- Died: March 15, 2004 (aged 30–31)
- Cause of death: Saudi Security Forces
- Known for: Saudi Most Wanted; Riyadh compound bombings

Khalid Ali bin-Ali al-Hajj (Arabic: خالد علي بن علي الحج; 1973 – March 15, 2004), also known as Abu-Hazim al-Sha'ir (Arabic: أبو هزيم الشاعر), was an alleged leader of Al-Qaeda listed on Saudi Arabia's Most Wanted list.

== Background ==
Khaled Ali bin Ali Hajj (Arabic: خالد علي بن علي حاج), also known by his nom de guerre Abu Hazim al-Sha'ir (The Poet), was born in 1975 in Yemen. Despite his nickname "The Poet," he was not known for literary works; rather, it was a title he carried since his early days in militant circles. He was a Yemeni national who moved to Afghanistan in the late 1990s to join Al-Qaeda training camps.

== Militant Activity ==
Following the death of Abu Bakr al-Azdi in 2003, Hajj assumed a senior leadership role within Al-Qaeda in the Arabian Peninsula (AQAP). He was designated as the No. 1 most-wanted individual on the Saudi government's list of 26 most-wanted terrorists, published in December 2003.

As a primary strategist, Hajj was responsible for planning logistical support and coordinating attacks within the Kingdom. To evade the intensive manhunt by Saudi security forces, he frequently used forged identification documents and multiple aliases. However, his ability to operate was severely hampered by the proactive intelligence operations led by the Saudi Ministry of Interior, which successfully dismantled several of his support cells and cut off his communication lines, leading to his eventual isolation.

=== Relationship with Osama bin Laden ===
Hajj was a member of the "inner circle" of Osama bin Laden during the late 1990s in Afghanistan. He served as a trusted personal bodyguard for bin Laden, a position that required absolute loyalty and high-level combat training. According to intelligence reports, bin Laden personally selected Hajj for mission leadership due to his strategic mindset, eventually dispatching him to the Arabian Peninsula to revitalize Al-Qaeda's operations. This direct mentorship under bin Laden gave Hajj significant prestige and authority among militant cells in the region.

== Operations and Cell Structure ==
Upon his arrival in Riyadh, Hajj took command of the Al-Qaeda cells, focusing on transforming them into a more organized and secretive paramilitary structure. His cell was characterized by a high degree of compartmentalization to avoid detection. He oversaw the acquisition of safe houses across various Riyadh neighborhoods, including Al-Suwaidi and Al-Naseem, which were used for storing explosives and planning logistics.

Under his leadership, the cell attempted to target vital infrastructure and foreign housing compounds. However, his "old guard" tactics were constantly met with preemptive strikes. The Saudi Ministry of Interior's strategy of "cutting the supply lines" led to the arrest of several key members of his cell, including experts in forging documents and explosive manufacturing. This systematic dismantling forced Hajj into a defensive position, eventually leading him to move frequently within the city under extreme secrecy until his final confrontation.

== Death and neutralization ==
On the evening of March 15, 2004, Saudi security forces conducted a high-stakes preemptive operation in eastern Riyadh. Based on precise intelligence, special forces intercepted a vehicle near the intersection of Abd al-Rahman bin Awf Street in the Al-Naseem district. Inside the vehicle were Khaled Ali Hajj and his associate, Ibrahim bin Abdulaziz bin Mohammed al-Mezyad.

Upon being cornered, Hajj attempted to use a hand grenade against the security personnel, but he was neutralized by elite marksmen before he could detonate it. The operation was noted for its tactical precision, as no civilian casualties or injuries to security forces were reported despite the engagement occurring in a residential area. Following the neutralization, authorities recovered weapons and approximately 500,000 Saudi Riyals (approximately $133,000) in his possession, which was intended to fund further terrorist activities.

His death created a major leadership vacuum in Al-Qaeda's command structure in the Arabian Peninsula, which was later temporarily filled by Abdel Aziz al-Muqrin.
