= Fawaz al-Nashimi =

Saudi member of al-Qaeda

Fawaz bin Mohammed al-Nashimi
- فواز بن محمد النشمي
- Born: Saudi Arabia
- Died: June 2004
- Other name: Turki bin Fuheid al-Muteiry
- Military career
- Allegiance: Al-Qaeda in the Arabian Peninsula
- Known for: Identified as the "20th hijacker" of the September 11 attacks
- Conflicts: 2004 Khobar massacre

Fawaz bin Mohammed al-Nashimi (Arabic: فواز بن محمد النشمي, Fawwāz bin Muḥammad an-Našimī; died June 2004), also known as Turki bin Fuheid al-Muteiry (ترك بن فهيد المطيري, Turky bin Fuhīd al-Muṭīry), was a member of Al-Qaeda in Saudi Arabia and was claimed by the group to be the 20th hijacker of the September 11 attacks. Born in Saudi Arabia, Nashimi participated in the 2004 Khobar massacre and successfully escaped Saudi security forces. He was killed by Saudi forces in June 2004.

On June 21, 2006, a US intelligence contractor in Virginia, IntelCenter, released a 54-minute Al-Qaeda video in which Nashimi justifies attacking the Western World. Several days before on June 13, an audio webpost supposedly from Al-Qaeda claimed that Nashimi was to have been the 20th hijacker on United Airlines Flight 93, but was unable to participate at the planned time.
