= 2004 Khobar massacre =

2004 terrorist attack in Saudi Arabia

Coordinates: 26°19′16.84″N 50°11′32.99″E

2004 Khobar Massacre
- Location: Khobar, Saudi Arabia
- Date: 29–30 May 2004; 6:45 am – 6:30 am (UTC+3)
- Attack type: Hostage crisis, mass murder
- Deaths: 22
- Injuries: 25
- Perpetrators: The Jerusalem Squadron, Al-Qaeda

On 29 May 2004, a Saturday, four men armed with guns and bombs attacked two oil industry installations and a residential compound, in Al-Khobar, Saudi Arabia—the hub of the Saudi oil industry. Over approximately 25 hours, the gunmen, describing themselves as members of "The Jerusalem Squadron" or "Jerusalem Brigade", killed 22 and injured 25 in Khobar.

Their targets were the Arab Petroleum Investments Corporation building and the Al-Khobar Petroleum Centre, and a foreign workers' housing complex, the Oasis Compound, in the Gulf city of Khobar. Their victims included 19 foreigners from nine countries—eight people from India, three from the Philippines, two from Sri Lanka, one each from Sweden, Italy, the United Kingdom, the United States, South Africa and Egypt. According to witnesses the attackers asked the hostages if they were Christian or Muslim, letting the Muslims go with a lecture, and shooting the non-Muslims. One victim was tied to the back of a vehicle and dragged through the street.

== Casualties ==
Deaths by nationality
Country	Number
India	8
Philippines	3
Saudi Arabia	3
Sri Lanka	2
Egypt	1
Italy	1
South Africa	1
Sweden	1
United Kingdom	1
United States	1
Total	22

== Perpetrators ==
Most news describe the attackers being four in number. Claiming responsibility was a previously unheard-of militant group calling itself "The Jerusalem Squadron" or 'Jerusalem Brigade' of the 'Mujahedin of the Arabian Peninsula'—a local Saudi Arabia-based faction of al-Qaeda. The group said it was attacking "Zionists and Crusaders" who are in Saudi Arabia to "steal our oil and resources." According to the then Saudi Ambassador in Washington, Prince Bandar bin Sultan, the goal of the terrorists was to harm Saudi Arabia's stability and harm its economy. An audio tape was released in which Abdulaziz al-Muqrin, thought to be one of al-Qaeda's leaders in Saudi Arabia, took responsibility. Jamestown Foundation's Terrorism Monitor identified its leader as Turki bin Fahd al-Moteiri (also known as Fawaz al-Nashimi).

Kidnappers asked the hostages if they were Christian or Muslim, letting the Muslims go, and slitting the throats of non-Muslims.

In a 3000 word account of the killings posted on a website, Fawaz al-Nashimi, the operation's commander, describes the killing of an Italian expatriate after the captive has pleaded for his life.

Brother Husayn spotted the Italian infidel lout. He pointed his weapon at him and ordered him to approach. The infidel lout approached. We examined his identification papers and decided to contact Al-Jazeera so that he could address his countrymen and send them a message warning against fighting a war against Islam and its people. We would then cut his throat to send a message to the Italians who are fighting our brothers in Iraq and to the idiot leader of Italy, who wants to confront the lions of Islam. We contacted Al-Jazeera. I told the announcer to talk to him [the Italian]. He began to talk to him. The announcer asked me, "Does he speak English?" I told the announcer, "Do you have Italian translators?" He said, "Yes." I said, "So let him speak his language." He spoke for several minutes. I asked the announcer, "Did you record that?" He said, "Yes." Then the hero Nimr cut his throat.

Saudi security forces have been criticized for allowing the perpetrators to move freely from one target to another as late as five hours into the attack, to eat and sleep at the hotel and to give an interview to al-Jazeera television over the phone during their operation. Government forces also failed to prevent the attackers from fighting their way out of the compound and escaping. According to author Michael Griffin, the seeming "impotence" of the security forces and the "stolen SUVs, pilfered uniforms and a freedom in their savagery" of the attackers, may indicate that the attacks were "condoned, if not encouraged, by the security forces set up" to protect the foreign workers.

== Timeline of the attack ==
=== Sources for attack details ===
Various accounts exist of the precise details of this attack.

=== Al-Khobar Petroleum Centre ===
At 06:45 a group of four terrorists, separate from the group that attacked the Oasis compound, arrive in a vehicle and shot at guards and employees around the front gate of the Al-Khobar Petroleum Centre, which is next to the DHL building on the main Doha to Khobar road. An American and two Filipinos protecting the American were killed.

=== Arab Petroleum Investments Corporation Building ===
At 7:15 terrorists in a vehicle attacked the Apicorp Compound. The compound is a quarter of a mile away down the Khobar Dammam highway next to Raka compound. They used an RPG on the gatehouse and killed two security guards. A school bus was coming out at the time and was shot at, killing a 10-year-old Egyptian boy who was the son of an Apicorp employee.

Michael Hamilton, British, a leading member of the Apicorp Corporation, who had just dropped his wife off, arrived at the gate. His car was shot at and the gunmen dragged him out of the car still alive and tied him to the back of their four-wheel-drive vehicle, driving up the Raka road to the Dammam highway. Hamilton's facial features were unrecognizable when his body and car were later found dumped under a causeway. The terrorist vehicle with Hamilton tied behind made it as far as the intersection lights before a Saudi civilian rammed their car off the road. The terrorist shot the Saudi dead before he could get out of his car. The police shot the terrorists before they could make their escape. In honour of Michael Hamilton's death, British International School of Al Khobar (BISAK) named one of their halls after him.

=== Oasis 3 Compound ===
At 7:30 six terrorists scaled the walls of Oasis 3 compound. Another five drove up to the main Vehicle Check Point. A civilian car was in front of the attackers and a school bus behind in the queue. The checkpoint had two closed gates. A car drove through one gate, was inspected after the first gate closed, and then the second gate opened to let the car through. On the morning of the attack, the second was continuously open, so when the first gate opened, the terrorists drove straight through the second gate. While doing so, a terrorist opened the sunroof of their vehicle and killed the two armed guards with a machine gun. Turning back, he fired on the school bus, killing two children and wounding four children. 5-year-old and 7-year-old children were critically wounded.

The terrorists then drove into the main compound area. A security guard then got the children off the school bus and conducted them to a safe area in the compound.

They then exited their vehicle and moved on foot into the residential complex. They kicked in the doors and slit the throats of any non-Muslims they could find. Among those murdered were an Italian cook, Antonio Amato (35), and a Swedish maître d'hôtel, Magnus Johansson (50). Both were beheaded. The terrorists killed one American—Frank Floyd, an assistant marketing director for Resources Sciences Arabia Ltd. Most of the killings took place inside the compound's Italian restaurant, Casa Mia, where Amato and Johansson worked. According to an account by terrorist Fawaz al-Nashimi, captives were also executed with bullets to the head.

In the morning, the terrorists ate breakfast in the restaurant. They then returned to the first floor with the intention of killing Hindus. Eight Indians were killed. Al-Nashmi lists 3 cohorts, Nimr al-Baqmi, Husayn, and Nadir.

Booby-traps were placed at the exits of the Soha Towers Hotel. Al-Nashmi and two cohorts then escaped over the wall and stole a car to make a getaway. This was despite the compound being surrounded by soldiers and reporters with live television. "We were now on a road with trees shadowing the way, and all the security forces thought we were still in the hotel," Nashmi wrote. Nimr al-Baqmi was wounded while firing out of his vehicle, and was captured.

=== Rescue operation ===
By 21:30 Saudi Special Emergency Forces had surrounded the complex and extracted the school bus children who were hiding in an underground parking garage. A few British nursery workers were rescued from the Oasis compound, and were returned to the Las Dunas compound, where their families and friends had been waiting.

At 2:00 the next morning Saudi Special Emergency Forces attempted to enter the booby-trapped hotel. Several were injured in two explosions, and the group pulled back after receiving threats from the remaining terrorists to kill the hostages. At 02:30 two American military officers were injured and subsequently admitted to SAAD Specialist hospital and later flown out to Kuwait.

Saudi forces in four National Guard CH-46 Sea Knight helicopters arrived at 06:30 and were lowered onto the roof of the Soha Hotel to storm the building, while ground attackers fired into the building as a diversion. Following the operation, Saudi authorities announced that all the hostages were free and that they had killed two terrorists and captured another. Apparently, most of the attackers had fled before the Saudi raid. However, according to the Jamestown Terrorism Monitor, the terrorist cell was miles away by the next morning when the counter-terrorism forces landing on the hotel rooftop, and none of the terrorists were killed.

The Saudi Interior Ministry issued a statement claiming 41 hostages had been rescued by the commandos. According to a Western diplomat the hostages had been hiding in parts of the complex to avoid being killed by the gunmen.

=== Downtown Khobar ===
During the same day, shooting broke out in downtown Khobar, about twenty minutes away from the Oasis 3 compound. A vehicle was reported to be driving around the Khobar area with four armed men on board. They proceeded to kill and injure another 11 security and military personnel located at approximately five other compounds with one being confirmed as the Golden Belt. Another man, an Indian national was shot dead while his car was driving.

=== Emergency response in schools away from attack sites ===
The British and American schools around Khobar and Dhahran were put on lock-down during the terror attacks. In Dhahran, British Grammar School and the Dhahran primary and middle schools as well as the high school (all on the same campus next to the American consulate), children were not released from school until over an hour after the usual time.

International Indian School, Dammam (IISD) is a school about 30 minutes away in Dammam. Several of their students lived in the Dhahran/Khobar area. The school was on lockdown until it was time for school to dismiss, with many of the pupils not knowing what was happening. Many area schools ended the term a few weeks early due to the events.

== Aftermath of the attacks ==
Following the attacks, some foreign workers either fled the country or were evacuated by the companies they worked for, as they felt it was too dangerous to stay. The attack provided "a significant morale boost for al-Qaeda" according to the Jamestown Terrorism Monitor. However, an expert from the Al-Ahram Center for Political and Strategic Studies interviewed by the New York Times stated the lack of strategic importance of the sites indicates the weakness of the extremists.

World crude oil prices rose by 6.1% to $42 a barrel after the attack.

Several of the nearby compounds like al Mohawis, Rolaco, TIG, al Bustan, and others had around 3 to 6 Saudi army soldiers stationed at the gates checking each car thoroughly before allowing them in (including residents). Security at Oasis was hyped to the point where there was a lane out of each of the surrounding streets that was taken and dedicated to security lines. Each lane was blocked from the road by barricades, and eyewitnesses describe it as pretty much impenetrable. There were several stages of army protection including thorough checkups. Each army personnel was armed with machine guns. Several schools shut down a few weeks early including ISG schools like Dhahran Academy and ISG Dammam.

In early 2016, Saudi Arabia executed some of the surviving terrorists who were arrested in 2004. They were executed alongside Shiekh Nimr.

== In popular culture ==
The event was featured in the American action thriller films The Kingdom and Zero Dark Thirty.

== See also ==
- Insurgency in Saudi Arabia
- Khobar Towers Bombing
- Riyadh Compound Bombings
- 2004 Yanbu attack
