= Abdel Aziz al-Muqrin =

Leader of al-Qaeda in Saudi Arabia (1972–2004)

Abdel Aziz Issa Abdul-Mohsin al-Muqrin
- عبد العزيز عيسى عبد المحسن المقرن
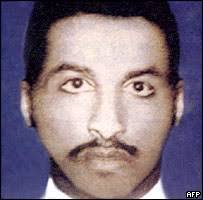

Leader of Al-Qaeda in the Arabian Peninsula
- Preceded by: Khaled Ali Hajj
- Succeeded by: Saleh al-Oufi

Personal details
- Born: 1972 Riyadh, Saudi Arabia
- Died: 18 June 2004 (aged 31–32) Riyadh, Saudi Arabia

Abdel Aziz Issa Abdul-Mohsin Al-Muqrin (/ˈɑːbdəl əˈziːz ˈɪsə ɑːlˈmɪɡrɪn/; Arabic: عبد العزيز عيسى عبد المحسن المقرن; also Abd al-Aziz al-Moqrin and other transliterations), alias Abu Hajr (ابو هاجر) and Abu Hazim, (1972 – 18 June 2004), was the leader of the militant Jihadist group al-Qaeda in Saudi Arabia. He succeeded Khaled Ali Hajj, when the latter was killed by Saudi security forces in March 2004. Al-Muqrin had trained with Osama bin Laden's Al-Qaeda in Afghanistan.

== Life ==
Al-Muqrin was born to middle-class parents in Riyadh and was a high school dropout. He married at the age of 19 and had one daughter. He left his wife in about 1988 to fight the Soviets in Afghanistan and later fought in Bosnia-Herzegovina. In the 1990s he ran guns from Spain to Algeria. Most of his training occurred in jihadist camps in Afghanistan. He was reported to have fought against Ethiopian forces in the Ogaden.

In 1995 he was arrested in Ethiopia and accused of taking part in a botched assassination attempt on Egyptian president, Hosni Mubarak. He was extradited to Saudi Arabia where he served a two-year prison term in Jeddah. His prison sentence was reduced after he memorized the Qur'an.

He was a skilled propagandist, using the Internet to recruit and deliver his message. Al-Muqrin told an Arabic website in 2003 that, "I have taken it upon myself and I have sworn to purge the Arabian Peninsula of the polytheists. We will fight the Crusaders and Jews in this country. They will not have any security until we evict them from the land of the Two Holy Places and until we evict them from the land of Palestine and the land of the Muslims, which they pillage and usurp from the east to the west."

Mohsen Al-Awaji, an expert in extremism, said in media interviews in 2004 that Al-Muqrin was "shallow, very simple-minded," adding that he "has no political brain. He's got the weapon and no mind to control the weapon." By contrast, Michael Scheuer, a former CIA intelligence officer, has described Muqrin as a strategist who wrote about insurgency doctrine. Muqrin wrote a book on military strategy called A Practical Course for Guerrilla War, which has been compared with Abu Bakr Naji's Management of Savagery as a book that has influenced Al Qaeda's thinking on guerrilla warfare.

Al-Muqrin was No. 1 on Saudi Arabia's second official list of most wanted terrorists, which was published in December 2003. In 2004 his faction claimed responsibility for a series of attacks against Westerners in Saudi Arabia including the June 2004 shooting that seriously wounded BBC correspondent Frank Gardner and killed cameraman Simon Cumbers, and the kidnapping and beheading of American contractor Paul Johnson. On the same day of the murder of Johnson, Saudi police commandos killed Al-Muqrin in a gun battle at a gas station in downtown Riyadh along with several associates including:

- Faisal Abdul-Rahman Abdullah al-Dakhil (who was also on the list),
- Turki bin Fuheid al-Muteiry, and
- Ibrahim bin Abdullah al-Dreiham.

Al-Muqrin was responsible for the May 29 attacks at Al-Khobar that left more than 20 people dead and several other operations.

The online magazine Al-Khansaa claims to have been founded by al-Muqrin shortly before his death. In 2004, plans were discovered posted online under al-Muqrin's name containing the itinerary, routes of travel, and security personnel of Prince Nayef bin Abdel Aziz, and plans to assassinate him with RPGs.

== Militant Activity (1988–2000) ==
Following his departure from Saudi Arabia in 1988, Al-Muqrin spent over a decade participating in various global conflict zones. His first destination was Afghanistan, where he underwent paramilitary training in Al-Qaeda affiliated camps during the final stages of the Soviet-Afghan War. In the early 1990s, he relocated to the Balkans to join militant groups during the Bosnian War. His activities also extended to North Africa, where he was reportedly involved in weapons smuggling operations between Spain and Algeria during the Algerian Civil War.

Al-Muqrin’s transnational militant career was marked by significant setbacks and legal confrontations. In 1995, he participated in a high-profile failed assassination attempt against Egyptian President Hosni Mubarak in Addis Ababa, Ethiopia. He was subsequently captured by Ethiopian authorities and extradited to Saudi Arabia. After serving a two-year prison sentence in Jeddah, he returned to Afghanistan in the late 1990s, where he reportedly fought alongside the Taliban and further solidified his ties with the Al-Qaeda leadership, eventually leading to his appointment to establish an operational cell within the Kingdom.

== Use of Foreign Documents ==
During his movements between conflict zones and his return to the region, Al-Muqrin was known to utilize various forged or illicitly obtained travel documents to evade security tracking. Most notably, Saudi and regional intelligence reports indicated that he had utilized a Qatari passport under a false identity. This document allowed him to travel with less scrutiny across borders before he was officially designated as the top wanted individual on Saudi Arabia's list of 26 terrorists. The use of such documents was a key part of his logistical strategy to maintain his underground presence and coordinate between AQAP and foreign extremist elements.

== Leadership of AQBH and the 2004 Campaign ==
In early 2004, Al-Muqrin assumed leadership of Al-Qaeda in the Land of the Two Holy Mosques (AQBH). His tenure famously involved the kidnapping and killing of American aeronautics engineer Paul Marshall Johnson Jr. in June 2004.

Al-Muqrin attempted to use Johnson as a political tool, threatening to kill him unless the Saudi government released Al-Qaeda prisoners within 72 hours. When the government refused to negotiate, Al-Muqrin and his cell proceeded to behead Johnson, which they filmed and broadcast online.

According to Saudi security official Colonel Khalid al-Muhayya, this act was not a sign of strength, but a "desperate and failed attempt to intimidate the Saudi state" at a time when the organization was already collapsing. Al-Muhayya noted that Al-Muqrin’s "recklessness and tactical arrogance" in filming and promoting the murder of Paul Johnson became his undoing. The digital and field trail left by the publication of the murder footage allowed Saudi special forces to pinpoint Al-Muqrin’s location with high precision. Instead of inciting fear, the murder of Paul Johnson accelerated the total mobilization of Saudi security units, leading to Al-Muqrin being cornered and neutralized at a gas station in Riyadh within hours of the footage being released.

== Media Propaganda and Recruitment ==
Al-Muqrin was a pioneer in using the internet as a primary tool for terrorist recruitment and psychological warfare. He was the central figure behind the organization’s media wing, which managed several platforms to disseminate its ideology:

- Sawt al-Jihad (Voice of Jihad): Al-Muqrin was a frequent contributor and editor for this online magazine, using it to provide tactical advice to "lone wolf" attackers and to justify the targeting of foreign residents.
- Al-Khansaa Magazine: He was instrumental in founding the first online extremist magazine specifically targeting women. Through this publication, Al-Muqrin sought to radicalize female supporters, encouraging them to play roles in supporting militant logistics.
- Online Forums and Multimedia: Al-Muqrin utilized extremist web forums such as Al-Nida to broadcast graphic videos and audio speeches. His recurring slogan, "Expel the polytheists from the Arabian Peninsula" (أخرجوا المشركين من جزيرة العرب), was a hallmark of his digital propaganda.

Experts note that this heavy reliance on digital media was a double-edged sword; while it helped recruit followers, it also provided Saudi intelligence with the "digital fingerprints" necessary to track the organization’s leadership.

== Death ==
The intelligence operation that led to Al-Muqrin’s location began in the Olaya district of Riyadh. Al-Muqrin was spotted at an internet cafe and identified by an undercover security operative. The operative managed to track Al-Muqrin as he left the cafe and entered a vehicle, relaying the car's description and movements to rapid-response units.

On 18 June 2004, employees at a gas station in Riyadh's Al-Malaz district noticed a suspicious vehicle with visible bloodstains. The employees alerted authorities, providing a critical lead that allowed undercover units to monitor the location. The timing of the operation coincided with a high-profile football match between local rivals Al-Nassr and Al-Hilal at the nearby Prince Faisal bin Fahd Stadium in Al-Malaz. The sports event provided a strategic cover for the heavy presence of security forces in the area, which Al-Muqrin and his associates did not initially suspect.

When Al-Muqrin and three of his top aides Faisal al-Dakhil, Turki al-Muteiry, and Ibrahim al-Dreiham returned to the station, they realized they were under surveillance. A shootout ensued between Al-Muqrin and Saudi counter-terrorism units. Saudi commandos killed all four militants. Al-Riyadh reported public celebrations in Riyadh following the operation’s success, with citizens chanting slogans in support of the security forces.
