= Voice of Jihad =

Organization

Voice of Jihad (Arabic: صوت الجهاد, romanized: Ṣawt al-Jihād) was the title of a website, which claims to be one of the official websites of the Taliban. It mainly provides latest news about Afghanistan in Arabic, Dari, English, Pashto, and Urdu. After the Taliban restored the Islamic Emirate of Afghanistan, it was renamed the Official Voice of Afghanistan.

Voice of Jihad was also the title of an online journal published by the Saudi branch of al-Qaeda between 2004 and 2007. An April 27, 2005, edition of Voice of Jihad included an article asking sympathizers not to appropriate the term "Voice of Jihad" for their own publications. An issue was published in February 2007 after a hiatus of almost two years.

== See also ==
- Bakhtar News Agency
- Mass media in Afghanistan
- Imams Online
- Islam Online
