= List of former Guantanamo Bay detainees alleged to have returned to terrorism =

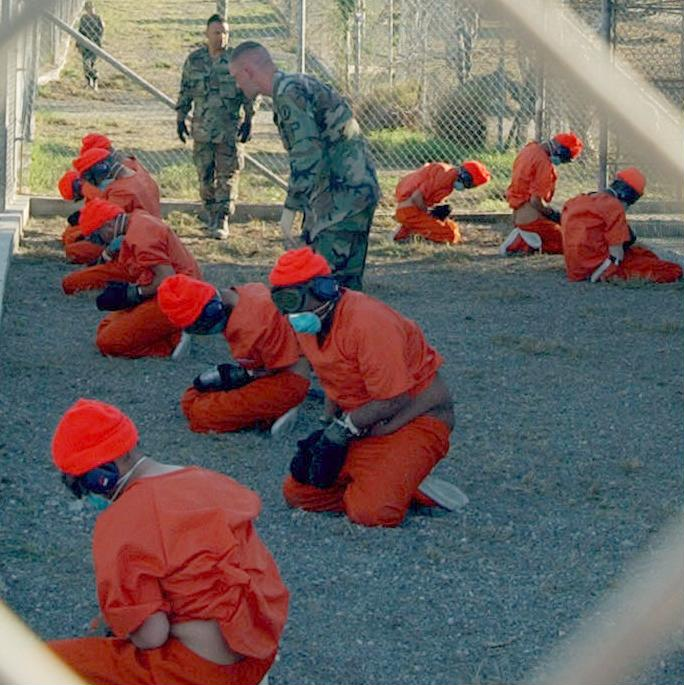
Detainees upon arrival at Camp X-Ray, January 2002

Semiannually, the Office of the Director of National Intelligence (ODNI) publishes an unclassified "Summary of the Reengagement of Detainees Formerly Held at Guantanamo Bay, Cuba" (Reengagement Report). According to ODNI's most recent Reengagement Report, since 2009, when current rules and processes governing transfer of detainees out of Guantanamo were put in place, ODNI assess that 5.1% of detainees – 10 men total, 2 of whom are deceased – are more likely than not to have reengaged in terrorist activities.

== Background ==
The Guantanamo Bay detention camp (Spanish: Centro de detención de Guantánamo) is a United States military prison located within Guantanamo Bay Naval Base, also referred to as Guantánamo, GTMO, and "Gitmo" (/ˈɡɪtmoʊ/), on the coast of Guantánamo Bay in Cuba. Of the 780 people detained there since January 2002 when the military prison first opened after the September 11, 2001 attacks, 731 have been transferred elsewhere, 39 remain there, and 9 have died while in custody.

Once every six months, the Director of National Intelligence (ODNI) – in consultation with the Director of the Central Intelligence Agency and the Secretary of Defense – is required to make public an unclassified "Summary of the Reengagement of Detainees Formerly Held at Guantanamo Bay, Cuba" (Reengagement Report). ODNI's Reengagement Reports break down all transfers from Guantanamo by Presidential administration under which they occurred, and categorize them according to whether ODNI assesses a former detainee to be "confirmed" or "suspected" of "reengaging" in "terrorist activities" (as those terms are defined in the reports).

The standard for inclusion in the "confirmed" category is "a preponderance of information which identifies a specific former Guantanamo detainee as directly involved in terrorist or insurgent activities." In other words, ODNI considers reengagement "confirmed" if it is more likely than not – i.e., there is at least a 51% chance – that a former detainee is directly involved in terrorist activities. For inclusion in the "suspected" category, ODNI need only find that there is "[p]lausible but unverified or single-source reporting indicating a specific former GTMO detainee is directly involved in terrorist or insurgent activities."

DNI's most recent Reengagement Report was declassified in December 2020 and made public on April 5, 2021. As of this report, 729 detainees had been transferred out of Guantanamo since the prison opened in 2002. According to ODNI, 125 of them were "confirmed of reengaging" (14.3%) and 104 "suspected of reengaging" (17.1%). However, the vast majority of those transfers (115 of them) occurred pre-2009, before current rules and processes governing transfers were put in place. After 2009—when transfers have been subject to the rules and processes that remain in place today—the reengagement rates have dropped significantly, to 5.1% ("confirmed of reengaging") and 10.2% (suspected of reengaging"), respectively. The 5.1% statistic represents 10 men total, 2 of whom are deceased.

== History ==
As early as 2004, the US government claimed that detainees released from Guantanamo Bay detainment camp had returned to the battlefield. Initially, government spokesmen claimed relatively small numbers of former Guantanamo captives had returned to the battlefield. In a press briefing on March 6, 2007, a "Senior Defense official" commented:

I can tell you that we have confirmed 12 individuals have returned to the fight, and we have strong evidence that about another dozen have returned to the fight.

On Monday, May 14, 2007, Pentagon officials Joseph Benkert and Jeffrey Gordon repeated the assertion that thirty former captives had returned to the battlefield in testimony before the United States Congress. They identified six of the thirty by name. They offered the names of the three men previously identified: "Mullah Shahzada"; "Maulavi Abdul Ghaffar"; and Abdullah Mahsud. They tied "Mullah Shahzada" to Mohamed Yusif Yaqub, a Guantanamo captive who was listed on the official list. The other three names they offered were: Mohammed Ismail; Abdul Rahman Noor; and Mohammed Nayim Farouq.

On July 12, 2007, the Department of Defense placed an additional page on their site, entitled: "Former Guantanamo Detainees who have returned to the fight". This list contained one additional name, not on the list released on May 14, 2007, for a total of seven names. The new name was Ruslan Odizhev, a Russian who Russian police reported died while resisting arrest on June 27, 2007.

On 13 January 2009, the Pentagon said that 18 former detainees are confirmed to have participated in attacks, and 43 are suspected to have been involved in attacks. A spokesman said evidence of someone being "confirmed" could include fingerprints, a conclusive photograph or "well-corroborated intelligence reporting." He said the Pentagon would not discuss how the statistics were derived because of security concerns. National security expert and CNN analyst Peter Bergen, stated that some of those "suspected" to have returned to terrorism are so categorized because they publicly made anti-American statements, "something that's not surprising if you've been locked up in a U.S. prison camp for several years." If all on the "confirmed" list have indeed returned to the battlefield, that would amount to 4 percent of the detainees who have been released at that time.

According to the Office of the Director of National Intelligence, through December 2020, 14.5% of detainees transferred since 2002 are "confirmed of reengaging" in terrorist activities and 17.1% "suspected of reengaging" (see background section above for definitions of these terms and additional explanation). Since 2009—when current rules and processes governing transfers were implemented—the reengagement rates assessed by ODNI have dropped significantly, to 5.1% ("confirmed of reengaging") and 10.2% (suspected of reengaging"), respectively. The 5.1% statistic represents 10 men total, 2 of whom are deceased.

== Lists of alleged returnees ==
=== 2006 list ===
92	Abdullah Mahsud
363	Maulvi Abdul Ghaffar
367	Mohamed Yusif Yaqub
582	Abdul Rahman Noor
633	Mohammed Nayim Farouq
930	Mohammed Ismail

=== 2007 list ===
reported isn	name	In July 2007 Press Release	Disposition	Citizenship	Country of Act
92	Said Mohammed Alim Shah	Yes	Killed	Afghanistan	Afghanistan
203	Ravil Shafeyavich Gumarov	No	Arrest	Russia	Russia
69	Ruslan Anatolivich Odijev	Yes	Arrest	Russia	Russia
220	Abdallah Saleh Ali Al Ajmi	No	Killed	Kuwait	Iraq
294	Mohammed Mizouz	No	Arrest	Morocco	Morocco
297	Ibrahim Shafir Sen	No	Arrest	Turkey	Turkey
363	Shai Jahn Ghafoor	Yes	Killed	Afghanistan	Afghanistan
587	Mohammed Yusif Yaqub	Yes	Killed	Afghanistan	Afghanistan
587	Ibrahim Bin Shakaran	No	Arrest	Morocco	Morocco
633	Mohammed Nayim Farouq	Yes	At Large	Afghanistan	Afghanistan
674	Timur Ravilich Ishmurat	No	Arrest	Russia	Russia
930	Mohammed Ismail	Yes	Capture	Afghanistan	Afghanistan

=== 2008 list ===
Names of Guantanamo captives who are alleged to have returned to the battlefield
ID	Name	Notes
363	Maulvi Abdul Ghaffar AKA Shai Jahn Ghafoor	Had been a senior Taliban military leader prior to capture.; Captured in Afghanistan in December 2001, was one of the twenty-three prisoners released from Camp Delta in late January 2004. After his release, he joined the remnants of the Taliban and was killed in a gunfight on September 26, 2004.; The official list of Guantanamo captives included two men with the same name, who remained in custody years after Maulvi Abdul Ghaffar had been reported to have been released, and killed in combat.
92	Abdullah Mehsud	Reportedly captured in Afghanistan in December 2001 after surrendering to Abdul Rashid Dostum.; That he was ever been captured, and sent to Guantanamo has been challenged.; Allegedly masterminded the kidnapping of two Chinese engineers in Pakistan's South Waziristan region.; Allegedly returning to his position as an Al-Qaeda field commander. One of the Chinese engineers died during a rescue mission, the other was rescued.; Mehsud also claimed responsibility for the bombing at Islamabad's Marriott Hotel in October 2004. The blast injured seven people, including a U.S. diplomat, two Italians and the Pakistani prime minister's chief security officer. Mehsud was subsequently reported to have been killed in combat.
203	Ravil Shafeyavich Gumarov	Reported to have had military training in Chechnya.; Convicted of bombing a natural gas pipeline on May 9, 2006.; Sentenced to 13 years.
211	Ruslan Anatolivich Odijev	Repatriated to Russian custody, cleared, then released.
294	Mohammed Bin Ahmad Mizouz	One of the first 200 captives to be repatriated.; Reported seeing guards urinate on the Koran.; Reported being tortured while in US custody, reported that all the techniques used in Abu Ghraib were first used on captives like him in Bagram.; Convicted in September 2007 of recruiting fighters to send to Iraq.
297	Ibrahim Shafir Sen	Sued Donald Rumsfeld upon his release.; Ibrahim Shafir Sen was transferred to Turkey in November 2003. In January 2008, Sen was arrested in Van, Turkey, and charged as the leader of an active al-Qaida cell.
367	Mohammed Yusif Yaqub aka Mullah Shahzada	Reports of the release, return to the battlefield, and subsequent death in combat of Mullah Shahzada, while reported in the press, is always attributed to unnamed insiders.; The official list of Guantanamo captives included a man the same name, Haji Shahzada who remained in custody years after the stories that Mullah Shahzada had been reported to have been released, and killed in combat. Haji Shahzada was one of the 38 captives whose Combatant Status Review Tribunal determined they had not been an enemy combatant in the first place.; On Monday, May 14, 2007, Pentagon officials, for the first time, tied the reports that "Mullah Shahzada" had returned to the battlefield to the name of one of the captives on the official list of Guantanamo captives, Mohammed Yusif Yaqub. According to Reuters summary of their testimony: "Released May 8, 2003, he assumed control of Taliban operations in Southern Afghanistan and died fighting U.S. forces on May 7, 2004."
587	Ibrahim Bin Shakaran	The Defense Intelligence Agency asserted Ibrahim Bin Shakaran had "returned to terrorism". The DIA reported: In September 2007 he was convicted in a Moroccan court for recruiting fighters for Al Qaida in Iraq in 2005.; Allegedly he was working to create an al Qaida in the Lands of the Maghreb.; Allegedly he was coordinating "sleeper cells" to go for training and return to Morocco.
930	Mohammed Ismail	First identified as a former captive who had returned to the battlefield in Testimony before Congress on Monday May 14, 2007. According to Reuters summary of their testimony: "Released from Guantanamo in early 2004, he was recaptured four months later in May while participating in an attack on U.S. forces near Kandahar. When captured, Ismail carried a letter confirming his status as a Taliban member in good standing."
582	Abdul Rahman Noor	First identified as a former captive who had returned to the battlefield in Testimony before Congress on Monday May 14, 2007. According to Reuters summary of their testimony: "Released in July 2003, he has since participated in fighting against U.S. forces near Kandahar. After his release, he was identified as the man described in an October 7, 2001, interview with Al Jazeera television as the "deputy defense minister of the Taliban."
633	Mohammed Nayim Farouq	First identified as a former captive who had returned to the battlefield in Testimony before Congress on Monday, May 14, 2007. According to Reuters summary of their testimony: Released from U.S. custody in July 2003, he quickly renewed his association with Taliban and al Qaeda members and has since become "reinvolved in anti-coalition militant activity."
930	Mohammed Ismail Agha	One of the three children who was held for a two years, in Camp Iguana, and released on January 29, 2004. He was reported by the Pentagon as having been captured in an attack on U.S. forces four months later.

== 2009 reports ==
Department of Defense spokesmen claimed in January 2009 that at least 61 former captives had returned to the fight. But they did not publish any of the men's names.

=== Saudi list ===
On February 3, 2009, the government of Saudi Arabia published a list of 85 most wanted suspected terrorists that included two former Guantanamo captives who had appeared in an alarming video, and nine other former captives.

=== BBC report ===
On February 18, 2009, the BBC News reported that UK officials had told them that an Afghan former captive repatriated in the Spring of 2008 had risen to a high-ranking position in the Taliban, in Pakistan, following his return. The BBC reports they had been told his name was Mullah Abdul Kayum Sakir. The USA did not list any captives with names close to Abdul Kayum Sakir. The five captives repatriated on April 30, 2008, are: Nasrullah, Esmatulla, Rahmatullah Sangaryar, Sahib Rohullah Wakil, and Abdullah Mohammad Khan.

=== Department of Defense ===
In March 2009, U.S. officials revealed that Abdullah Ghulam Rasoul (detainee #8) is now leading the Taliban's operations in southern Afghanistan.

=== The May 2009 "one in seven" claims ===
On May 21, 2009, Elizabeth Bumiller, writing in The New York Times, reported that they had secured access to an unreleased Pentagon report that asserted "one in seven" former captives "are engaged in terrorism or militant activity." According to The New York Times Pentagon officials had asserted 74 former captives had returned to terrorism, and had named 29 individuals, including 16 previously unpublished ones. The New York Times chose to publish only 15 of those 16 names because of discrepancies concerning the 16th.

On June 6, 2009 Clark Hoyt, whose byline lists him as The New York Times "public editor" wrote an apology to The New York Times readers for Bumiller's article.

Fifteen former captives as reported by the New York Times
isn	name	transfer date	nation	notes
8	Abdullah Gulam Rasoul	2007-12-12	Afghanistan	In 2007 he was transferred to the American wing of the Pul-e-Charkhi prison.; A false name used by Abdul Qayyum Zakir, a senior commander in the Taliban.; British officials believed Rasoul became the Taliban's operations commander in southern Afghanistan soon after his release and blamed him for masterminding an increase in roadside attacks against British and American troops.; The New York Times reported that Rasoul led a December 2008-January 2009 delegation to the Pakistani Taliban to convince them to refocus their efforts away from the Pakistani government and towards the American-led forces in Afghanistan.
23	Isa Khan	2004-09-17	Pakistan	
25	Majeed Abdullah al Joudi	2007-02-20	Saudi Arabia	
67	Abd al Razaq Abdallah Hamid Ibrahim al Sharikh	2007-09-05	Saudi Arabia	
82	Rasul Kudayev	2004-02-27	Russia	Was an athlete who fled persecution in Russia when he was a teenager.; Was captured in 2006 following an attack on Russian government facilities in October 2005.; His family reports that his stay in Afghanistan and Guantanamo had left him with serious health problems, and that he was at home, under his mother's care, at the time of the attack.
92	Said Mohammed Alim Shah; aka Abdullah Mehsud			
154	Mazin Salih Musaid al Awfi	2007-07-15	Saudi Arabia	
159	Abdullah al Noaimi	2005-11-04	Bahrain	Knew the three men who died in the camp on June 10, 2006. He expressed skepticism about the official version, and questioned the credibility of the allegations against them.; In October 2008 Saudi authorities apprehended and detained al Noaimi when he was on a visit to Saudi Arabia.; Saudi authorities continue to hold him—without charge.
203	Ravil Shafeyavich Gumarov		Russia	
209	Almasm Rabilavich Sharipov		Russia	
211	Ruslan Odijev		Russia	
230	Humud Dakhil Humud Said al Jadan	2007-07-15	Saudi Arabia	
231	Abdulhadi Abdallah Ibrahim al Sharakh	2007-09-05	Saudi Arabia	
294	Mohammed bin Ahmad Mizouz	July 2004	Morocco	Accused of recruiting for Al Qaeda in Iraq.
333	Muhammad al Awfi	2007-11-09	Saudi Arabia	Graduated from the Saudi jihadist rehabilitation center.; Unexpectedly left Saudi Arabia without government permission in December 2008.; Appeared in a threatening video published by al Qaeda in the Arabian Peninsula in January 2009.; Was named on a Saudi Arabian list of most wanted suspected terrorists in February 2009.; Voluntarily surrendered himself to Saudi security officials in March 2009.
372	Said Ali al Shihri	2007-11-09	Saudi Arabia	Graduated from the Saudi jihadist rehabilitation center.; Unexpectedly left Saudi Arabia without government permission in December 2008.; Appeared in a threatening video published by al Qaeda in the Arabian Peninsula in January 2009, where he was described as the group's second in command.; Was named on a Saudi Arabian list of most wanted suspected terrorists in February 2009.; Called upon Somali pirates to increase their attacks on western shipping.
546	Muhibullah	2005-07-19	Afghanistan	
571	Saad Madi Saad al Azmi	2005-11-02	Kuwait	Faced charges in Kuwait following his repatriation on November 4, 2005. The charges were based on evidence supplied by the USA that he had ties to Al Wafa. The Kuwaiti court acquitted Al Azmi.
587	Ibrahim bin Shakaran	July 2004	Morocco	Accused of recruiting for Al Qaeda in Iraq.
674	Timur Ravilich Ishmurat	2004-02-17	Russia	Arrested in Russia in March 2006.
798	Haji Sahib Rohullah Wakil	2008-04-30	Afghanistan	Member of Jama'at-ud-Da'wah Pakistan, a group created in 1985 to fight the Soviet occupation. Although designated a terrorist organization in 2008 by the State Department, it is not on any of the official U.S. watchlists as it has worked as a charity with no military wing since 1991.; Commander of Kunar anti-Taliban forces.; In 2002, represented Kunar Province in the Grand Assembly.; Arrested in August 2002 after an informer claimed he had helped members of al Qaida escape from Kunar. The Afghanistan government believes the head of the rival Mushwani tribe had turned Wakil in because the Mushwani tribe opposed a poppy eradication program that Wakil had begun in Kunar.; Released in April 2008. Upon his release Wakil met with President Hamid Karzai who apologized for his detention.; Currently a tribal elder representing Kunar province in the Afghanistan government.
1010	Nahir Shah	2007-11-02	Afghanistan	Transferred from Guantanamo to the Pul-e-Charkhi prison near Kabul on November 2, 2007.

=== DoD list of May 27, 2009 ===
On May 27, 2009, the Defense Intelligence Agency published a "fact sheet" Former Guantanamo Detainee Terrorism Trends that contained a Partial Listing of Former GTMO Detainees Who have Reengaged in Terrorism. Although it was published on May 27, it bears the date April 7, 2009.

Appendix A: Partial Listing of Former GTMO Detainees Who have Reengaged in Terrorism
Name	Nationality	Repatriated	Activity	Status
Sabi Janh Abdul Ghafour also; Maulvi Abdul Ghaffar	Afghanistan	March 2003	Died fighting Afghan forces	Suspected
Shah Mohammed	Pakistan	May 2003	Killed fighting US forces in Afghanistan	Confirmed
Yousef Muhammed Yaaqoub also known as; Mullah Shahzada	Afghanistan	May 2003	Taliban commander in Afghanistan; Organized jailbreak in Kandahar; killed on 7 May 2004 fighting US forces	Confirmed
Mohammed Nayim Farouq	Afghanistan	July 2003	Association with Taliban and al-Qaida; involved in anti-coalition activity	Suspected
Ibrahim Shafir Sen	Turkey	November 2003	Leader of al-Qaida cells in Van; recruited and trained members, provided illegal weapons and facilitation	Confirmed
Mohammed Ismail	Afghanistan	January 2004	Participated in an attack against US forces Taliban member	Confirmed
Abdullah D. Kafkas	Russia	March 2004	Suspected involvement in an attack against a traffice police checkpoint in Nalchik in October 2005	Suspected
Almasm Rabilavich Sharipov	Russia	March 2004	Association with terrorist group Hezb-e-Tahrir	Suspected
Timur Ravilich Ishmurat	Russia	March 2004	Involved in a gas line bombing	Confirmed
Ruslan Anatolivich Odijev	Russia	March 2004	Participated in several terrorism acts including an October 2005 attack in the Caucasus region that killed and injured several police officers	Suspected
Said Mohammad Alim Shah also known as; Abdullah Mahsud	Afghanistan	March 2004	Kidnapped two Chinese engineers; Claimed responsibility for an Islamabad hotel bombing; directed a suicide attack in April 2007 killing 31 people	Confirmed
Ravil Gumarov	Russia	March 2004	Involved in a gas line bombing	Confirmed
Abdullah Ghofoor	Afghanistan	March 2004	Taliban commander; planning attacks on U.S. and Afghan forces; killed in a raid by Afghan security forces	Suspected
Mohammed Bin Ahmad Mizouz	Morocco	July 2004	Recruiter for al-Qaida in Iraq	Confirmed
Ibrahim Bin Shakaran	Morocco	July 2004	Recruiter for al-Qaida in Iraq	Confirmed
Isa Khan	Pakistan	September 2004	Association with Tehrik-i-Taliban	Suspected
Muhibullah	Afghanistan	July 2005	Association with the Taliban	Suspected
Abdallah Saleh Ali al-Ajmi	Kuwait	November 2005	Conducted a suicide attack in Iraq	Confirmed
Abdullah Majid Al-Naimi	Bahrain	November 2005	Arrested in October 2008; involved in terrorist facilitation; has known associations with al-Qaida	Confirmed
Saad Madhi Saad Hawash al Azmi	Kuwait	November 2005	Association with al-Qaida	Suspected
Majid Abdullah Lahiq al Joudi	Saudi Arabia	February 2007	Terrorist facilitation	Confirmed
Mazin Salih Musaid al-Alawi al-Awfi also known as; Abu al-Hareth Muhammad al-Awfi	Saudi Arabia	July 2007	Leadership figure in al-Qaida in Arabian Peninsula	Confirmed
Abd al Razzaq Abdallah Ibrahim al-Sharikh	Saudi Arabia	September 2007	Arrested in September 2008 for supporting terrorism	Suspected
Abd al Hadi Abdallah Ibrahim al Sharikh	Saudi Arabia	September 2007	Arrested in September 2008 for association with terrorist members; supporting terrorism	Suspected
Zahir Shah	Afghanistan	November 2007	Participation in terrorist training	Confirmed
Abu Sufyan al Azdi al-Shihri	Saudi Arabia	November 2007	Leadership figure in al-Qaida in Arabian Peninsula	Confirmed
Abdullah Gulam Rasoul	Afghanistan	December 2007	Taliban military commander for Afghanistan; Organizaed an assault on U.S. military aircraft in Afghanistan	Suspected
Hajji Sahib Rohullah Wakil	Afghanistan	April 2008	Association with terrorist groups	Suspected

== 2017 ==
Abu-Zakariya al-Britani, also known as Jamal Udeen Al-Harith, murdered a number of Iraqi soldiers and killed himself via murder-bombing in 2017. The BBC reported that Tony Blair personally was involved with getting Abu-Zakariya freed from Guantanamo in 2004. The UK government paid $1 million as compensation to Abu-Zakariya al-Britani for his stay at Guantanamo.

== Third party comments ==
In August 2011 UK captive Tarek Dergoul got into a scuffle with a parking official, who was giving his car a ticket at an expired parking meter. He received a one-year conditional sentence, and had to undergo a mental health assessment. Benjamin Wittes, a legal scholar who focuses on counter-terrorism issues, referred to the issue of competing assessment as to what percentage of former Guantanamo captives should be considered Guantanamo recidivists, when he asked whether Dergoul's conviction would make him a recidivist.
