= List of Russian detainees at Guantanamo Bay =

The United States Department of Defense acknowledges holding nine Russian detainees in Guantanamo. However, the actual number of Russian citizens in Guantanamo remains unclear. Several men known to have been held in Guantanamo are missing from the official list. One citizen of Uzbekistan is listed as a Russian.

A total of 778 detainees have been held in extrajudicial detention in the Guantanamo Bay detention camps, in Cuba since the camps opened on January 11, 2002. The camp population peaked in 2004 at approximately 660. Only nineteen new detainees, all "high-value detainees" have been transferred there since the United States Supreme Court's ruling in Rasul v. Bush. As of January 6, 2025, 15 detainees remain at Guantanamo Bay.

== Russian detainees in Guantanamo ==
Russian detainees in Guantanamo
isn	name	arrival date	departure date	notes
82	Rasul Kudayev		2004-02-27	Repatriated to Russia on January 3, 2004.; Reported to have been repatriated on 24 February 2004 with six other Russian men.; Also called "Abdullah D. Kafkas".
203	Ravil Shafeyavich Gumarov	2002-01-21	2004-02-27	Repatriated to Russia on January 3, 2004.; Reported to have been repatriated on 24 February 2004 with six other Russian men.; Alleged to have played a role in a 2005 bombing.; Defense Intelligence Agency classifies him as a former detainee who "returned to terrorism".
209	Shamil Khadzhiyev / Almas Sharipov	2002-01-21	2004-02-27	Repatriated to Russia on January 3, 2004.; Reported to have been repatriated on 24 February 2004 with six other Russian men.; Granted asylum by the Netherlands.
211	Ruslan Anatoloivich Odijev	2002-06-14	2004-02-27	Reported to have been repatriated on 24 February 2004, as "Ruslan Anatolovich Odijev", with six other Russian men.; Charged with a role in bombing a gas pipeline in 2005.; Shot by police in 2007.; Human Rights advocates argue he was falsely accused.; Defense Intelligence Agency classifies him as a former detainee who "returned to terrorism".
492	Aiat Nasimovich Vahitov	2002-06-14	2004-02-27	Repatriated to Russia on January 3, 2004.; Reported to have been repatriated on 24 February 2004 with six other Russian men.
573	Rustam Akhmyarov	2002-05-01	2004-02-27	Reported to have been repatriated on 24 February 2004 with six other Russian men.
672	Zakirjan Asam	2002-06-08	2006-11-17	NLEC
674	Timur Ravilich Ishmurat	2002-06-14	2004-02-27	Repatriated to Russia.; Reported to have been repatriated on 24 February 2004, as "Timur Ravilich Ismurat", with six other Russian men.; Alleged to have played a role in a 2005 bombing.
702	Ravil Mingazov	2002-10-28	2017-01-18	
