= Ravil =

Given name

Ravil or Rawil (Tatar: Равил; the feminine form is Равиля Ravilya) is a given name widespread among the Tatars and Bashkirs. The origin of the name remains uncertain. According to one version, it is derived from the Hebrew name Reuel (רְעוּאֵל) meaning "friend of God", whereas in the Tatar language it has three different meanings: "young man", "wanderer" or "traveler", and "the spring sun". The name may refer to:

- Ravil Aryapov (born 1948), Russian association football manager and former player
- Ravil Fazleyev (born 1960), Russian former ice hockey defenceman
- Rawil Gaynetdin (born 1959), Grand Mufti of Russia
- Ravil Geniatulin (born 1955), Governor of Zabaykalsky Krai, Russia, since 1996
- Ravil Shafeyavich Gumarov (born 1962), Russian citizen who is alleged to have ties to terrorism
- Ravil Gusmanov (born 1972), Russian ice hockey left winger
- Ravil Khabutdinov (1928–1997), Soviet weightlifter and Russian coach
- Ravil Manafov (born 1988), Kazakhstani water polo player
- Rawil Menzeleýew (born 1942), Soviet association football player and Turkmenistan manager
- Ravil Mingazov (born 1967), citizen of Russia and detainee in the US Guantanamo Bay detention camps in Cuba
- Ravil Nachaev (born 1974), Uzbek former swimmer
- Ravil Netfullin (born 1993), Russian association football player
- Ravil Sabitov (born 1968), Russian association football manager and former player
- Ravil Safiullin (born 1955), Ukrainian businessman and politician
- Ravil Tagir (born 2003), Turkish association football player
- Ravil Umyarov (born 1962), Russian association football manager and former player
- Ravil Valiyev (born 1966), Soviet and Russian association football player
- Ravil Sookhoo (born 1987), Trinidad and Tobago

Media related to Ravil (given name) at Wikimedia Commons
