= Celikgogus v. Rumsfeld =

Celikgogus et al. v. Rumsfeld et al. was a federal lawsuit filed by several captives released from extrajudicial detention in the Guantanamo Bay detention camps.

== History of the extrajudicial detention of alleged combatants in Guantanamo ==
The United States has held 778 captives in extrajudicial detention in a camp in its offshore Naval Base Guantanamo. It was the position of the Bush Presidency that the President could authorize the detention of captives apprehended in Afghanistan while withholding from them the protections of the Geneva Conventions. Further, the Presidency asserted, that since the base in Guantanamo was not officially part of the USA, captives held there were not protected by US domestic law either. Finally, the Presidency asserted that the President had the authority to set up military commissions.

The Guantanamo camp was opened on January 11, 2008, and 780 captives have been held there. As of May 2008 approximately 260 captive remain.

In June 2004 the Supreme Court of the United States ruled, in Rasul v. Bush, that Guantanamo captives were entitled to access the US justice system. Specifically, they were entitled to submit habeas corpus petitions. And they were entitled to an opportunity to hear and challenge the allegations that had led to their detention.

In 2006 the Supreme Court ruled, in Hamdam v. Rumsfeld, that the President lacked the constitutional authority to set up military commissions. The ruling clarified that only the Congress had the authority to set up military commissions.

== Plaintiffs ==
Yuksel Celikgogus	A Turkish citizen, transferred from Guantanamo on November 22, 2003.
Ibrahim Sen	A Turkish citizen, transferred from Guantanamo on November 22, 2003.; The Defense Intelligence Agency characterizes Sen as someone who has "returned to terrorism". They assert: Ibrahim Shafir Sen was transferred to Turkey in November 2003. In January 2008, Sen was arrested in Van, Turkey, and charged as the leader of an active al-Qaida cell.
Nuri Mert	A Turkish citizen, transferred from Guantanamo on April 1, 2004.
Zakirjan Hasam	An Uzbekistani refugee, who had fled religious persecution in Uzbekistan for Afghanistan.; In 2004 his Combatant Status Review Tribunal determined he was not an "enemy combatant" after all.; Nevertheless, he continued to be held in Guantanamo until late 2006, when he was transferred to an Albanian refugee camp.
"Abu Muhammad"	An Algerian refugee, who had fled political unrest in Algeria.; In 2004 his Combatant Status Review Tribunal determined he was not an "enemy combatant" after all.; Nevertheless, he continued to be held in Guantanamo until late 2006, when he was transferred to an Albanian refugee camp.

=== Preliminary statements ===
Plaintiffs Yuksel Celikgogus, Ibrahim Sen, Nuri Mert, Zakirjan Hasam and Abu Muhammad were detained without charge and without any reasonable cause for from two to over four years at U.S. military bases in Afghanistan and Guantánamo Bay. They were denied due process, the ability to practice freely their religion and access to consular officials, and were subjected to coercive interrogations and acts of physical and mental abuse, including a confluence of acts amounting to torture. Though they have never had any affiliation with or materially supported any terrorist group, Mr. Celikgogus, Mr. Sen, Mr. Mert, Mr. Hasam and Mr. Muhammad were pressured to admit to being terrorist fighters.
