= Turkish detainees at Guantanamo Bay =

The United States Department of Defense acknowledges holding five Turkish captives in Guantanamo. A total of 778 captives have been held in extrajudicial detention in the Guantanamo Bay detention camps, in Cuba since the camps opened on January 11, 2002, The camp population peaked in 2004 at approximately 660. Only nineteen new captives, all "high value detainees" have been transferred there since the United States Supreme Court's ruling in Rasul v. Bush. As of July 2012 the camp population stands at 168.

== Celikgogus v. Rumsfeld ==
Several released Turkish captives have filed a lawsuit against the US for their detention -- Celikgogus v. Rumsfeld.

== Turkish captives acknowledged by the DoD ==
isn	name	arrival date	departure date	notes
61	Murat Kurnaz	2002-02-15	2006-08-24	Born in Germany to parents who were long-term Turkish guest workers, had recently applied for German citizenship.; Taken off a bus full of Tablighi Jamaat pilgrims because he was a foreigner.; Allegedly friends with a suicide bomber, who turned out to be still alive.; Allegedly captured in Tora Bora.; Abused by German special forces in Afghanistan.; German Chancellor personally requested his return from the US president.
291	Yuksel Celik Gogus		2003-11-18	Released on 22 November 2003, before the 2004 CSR Tribunals were set up.; Said: "They will come and take me away if I say what happened in Guantánamo."
297	Ibrahim Shafir Sen		2003-11-18	Released on 22 November 2003, before the 2004 CSR Tribunals were set up.
298	Salih Uyar	2002-02-15	2005-04-18	Accused of owning a Casio F91W digital watch.; Accused of claiming to study Arabic.; Accused of claiming to have lost his passport while fleeing the American aerial bombardment of Afghanistan.; Determined not to have been an enemy combatant after all.
543	Mahmud Nuri Mart	2002-02-15	2004-03-31	Released on 1 April 2004, before the 2004 CSR Tribunals were set up.
