= Ahmed Rachedi =

Ahmed Rachedi may refer to:

- Ahmed Errachidi, former Guantanamo captive from Morocco (alternative transliteration)
- Ahmed Rachedi (film director) (born 1938), Algerian film director
- Ahmed Rachedi, Mila, a commune in Algeria
