= List of Guantanamo detainees who officially reported abuse =

Some Guantanamo detainees are known to have officially reported abuse. Many Guantanamo detainees are known to have reported abuse when they appeared before their Combatant Status Review Tribunals, their Administrative Review Board hearings, or the Guantanamo military commissions of the ten detainees who have been charged.

Some detainee's transcripts record that they reported abuse, without recording any reaction from the field grade officers they addressed.

Some detainee's transcripts record that they reported abuse, and record the Tribunal or Board's President asking whether the abuse was at the hands of American soldiers, or whether it took place in Guantanamo.

In some cases, when the detainee reported abuse, while at Guantanamo, the transcripts record that the Presidents then promised to forward the reports of abuse to an appropriate authority.

Presidents never named the authority who might investigate the abuse. And they never told the detainee how that authority would decide whether to initiate an investigation. They never told the detainees what measures that authority would take if they initiated an investigation and determined the detainee's report was credible.

The Department of Defense has yet to release any reports of any investigations following up the reports of abuse addressed to the officers staffing Combatant Status Review Tribunal or Administrative Review Boards.

On October 18, 2006 the BBC reported on the Second Administrative Review Board hearing of a young Saudi it identified as Abdul-Razzaq. According to the BBC when he told his Board: "...some of the evidence presented to the board - especially evidence kept from detainees - is false or was taken under pressure or psychological torture."

The BBC reported that: "The ARB's chief promised to investigate this."

== Detainees who reported abuse at their Combatant Status Review Tribunal ==
Abdullah Al Tayabi	Reported torture from Afghan bounty hunters who shot and killed another prisoner in front of him, and told him they would kill him if he didn't learn a false story of involvement with al Qaeda, and repeat it when they sold him to the Americans.; Reported being made to stand bound and upright, and deprived of sleep for seven days at Bagram—like Bagram torture and prisoner abuse.; Reported regular brutal beatings in US custody.; Reported death threats if he didn't confess.; Reported being stripped naked and left out in the rain.; Reported being denied his medicine, and psychological counseling when he reported making suicide attempts.

== Detainees who reported abuse at their first annual Administrative Review Board hearing ==
Sultan Sari Sayel Al Anazi	Al Anazi told his Board that he had been tortured and humiliated.

== Detainees who reported abuse at their second annual Administrative Review Board hearing ==
Abd Al Razzaq Abdallah Ibrahim Al Tamini	Reported he was facing allegations that was: "false or was taken under pressure or psychological torture."
