= Mohammed Nayim Farouq =

Mohammed Naim Farouq
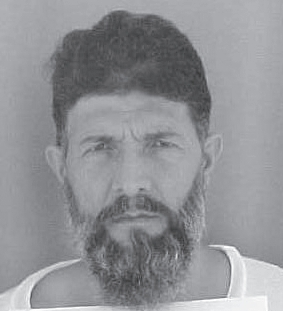
- Monhammed Nayim Farouq -- most wanted poster
- Born: 1960 (age 65–66); Zatoon Kahil, Afghanistan
- Released: July 2003
- Detained at: Guantanamo
- ISN: 633
- Charge: No charge (held in extrajudicial detention)
- Status: Repatriated -- DIA claims he has returned to the fight.

Mohammed Naim Farouq (born 1960) is a citizen of Afghanistan who was held in extrajudicial detention in the United States Guantanamo Bay detention camps, in Cuba. His Guantanamo Internment Serial Number was 633. Mohammed Naim Farouq is named on a "most wanted" poster issued by the Defense Intelligence Agency, and a press release entitled: "Ex-Guantanamo Detainees who have returned to the fight".

== Identity ==
- A former Guantanamo captive listed as Mohammed Nayim Farouq is named on the list of captives who returned to the battlefield, and on the full official list released on May 15, 2006.
- A former Guantanamo captive listed as Mohammed Nayim Farouq is named on the most wanted list. The most wanted list asserts he was born in 1960.
- A former Guantanamo captive listed as Mohammed Nayim Farouq is named on the full official list of all the captives' names, released on May 15, 2006. According to the list, his Guantanamo Internment Serial Number is 633. The list reports that he was born in Zatoon Kahil, in 1960.

=== Aliases ===
The "most wanted" poster lists four aliases.

- Mohammed Nayim,
- Naim Farrouqi,
- Commander Naim,
- Commander Naim Khan

== Alleged terrorist affiliation ==
The most wanted poster claims Farouq is affiliated to both the Taliban and al Qaeda. It asserts he has been a Taliban militia leader.

On July 16, 2007, the Department of Defense issued a press release entitled: Ex-Guantanamo Detainees who have returned to the fight. The press release stated:

After his release from US custody in July 2003, Farouq quickly renewed his association with Taliban and al-Qaida members and has since become re-involved in anti-Coalition militant activity.

== McClatchy interview ==
On June 15, 2008, the McClatchy News Service published articles based on interviews with 66 former Guantanamo captives. McClatchy reporters interviewed Farouq. According to the McClatchy report, Farouq was the leader of a gang of bandits prior to his capture and transport to Guantanamo, with no ties to al-Qaeda or the Taliban.

Abdul Jabar Sabit, Afghan Attorney General, interviewed Mohammed Naim Farouq in Guantanamo, and characterized him as a "rural gangster". Mohammed Naim Farouq, on the other hand, described himself as the leader of a kind of vigilante militia, who were trying to keep order in their region. He said that he and his family clashed with the Taliban, during their regime, but, eventually they "realized that I am from a big tribe ... so we came to an agreement."

The McClatchy report said Mohammed Naim Farouq became the head of Security for Zormat District, following the Taliban's ouster, noting: "It's not clear whether the new, U.S.-backed government appointed Farouq to that position or, more likely, whether he just had more guns than anyone else in the area." Mohammed Naim Farouq was apprehended after he confronted some American soldiers who had apprehended some of his men.

According to various Afghan officials, Farouq became a Taliban leader after his repatriation. He however maintained, during his interview, that he was just trying to keep order in his region.

Mohammed Naim Farouq reported routine abuse and humiliation by his American captors. He was not cooperative with his interrogators: "They asked me if I knew Osama bin Laden. I said, 'Fuck bin Laden and fuck your wife, too. Bin Laden came and destroyed our nation, and you came and destroyed our nation. But at least bin Laden was a Muslim and did not humiliate us like this."

Farouq told McClatchy reporters that he had opposed the Taliban when they were in power and that his tribal militia had struggled with them, that his brother had been driven into exile.

Farouq described being taken into American custody after questioning American GIs when they had taken some of his men into custody—even though he had identified himself as the District's Police Commander. Farouq described being repeatedly humiliated in the Kandahar detention facility and the Bagram Theater Detention Facility by being stripped naked: "they took me into interrogation completely naked. They asked me if I knew Osama bin Laden. I said, 'Fuck bin Laden and fuck your wife, too. Bin Laden came and destroyed our nation, and you came and destroyed our nation. But at least bin Laden was a Muslim and did not humiliate us like this." He described seeing an American soldier in Afghanistan throw a Koran into a bucket of excrement.

== Accusations of Taliban and al-Qaeda associations ==
In May 2009, Elizabeth Bumiller of the New York Times, citing a leaked report leaked to her, asserted that Mohammed Naim Farouq had Taliban and Al Qaeda associations. On May 26, 2009, the McClatchy News Service published a portion of their interview with Farouq. In the interview he said everyone in his province had welcomed the Americans and that he was the first person captured in his province. He said that the Hamid Karzai government had asked him to resume his job as District Chief, but that after years of humiliation while in US detention, he "had enough", and he declined.
