= List of Moroccan detainees at Guantanamo Bay =

Moroccan Guantanamo detainees
Date	January 11, 2002 – Present
Location	Guantanamo Bay detention camps, Cuba

There have been approximately fifteen Moroccans detained in Guantanamo. The United States maintained over 750 captives in extrajudicial detention in the Guantanamo Bay detention camps, in Cuba. Different sources offer different estimates of the number of Moroccans who have been held. The US Department of Defense released what they called an official list of all the detainees who had been held in military custody in Guantanamo. It lists fifteen Moroccan detainees.

== List of Moroccan Guantanamo detainees ==
isn	name	place of birth	date of birth	arrival date	transfer date	notes
56	Abdullah Tabarak Ahmad	Casablanca	December 12, 1955	2002-01-17	July 1, 2003	The Washington Post reported that on February 2, 2004 General Geoffrey Miller told the Red Cross that Tabarak was the sole remaining detainee they would not be allowed access to.; On July 24, 2008, during Salim Ahmed Hamdan's Guantanamo Military Commission, it was revealed that Hamdan had informed his interrogators that "Abdellah Tabarak" was the leader of Osama bin Laden bodyguards.; Repatriated to Morocco in 2004.
72	Lahcen Ikassrien	Targuist	October 2, 1972	2002-02-08	July 18, 2005	Originally identified as Reswan A. Abdesalam.; His real identity was revealed through his fingerprints.; Alleged to have ties to Imad Eddin Barakat Yarkas, a mastermind of the Madrid bombing.; Extradited to stand trial in Spain on July 18, 2005.; Acquitted on October 11, 2006.
75	Najib Mohammad Lahassimi	Settat	September 28, 1978	2002-02-07	February 7, 2006	Sentenced to three years for falsifying documents.
123	Muhammad Hussein Ali Hassan	Selouane	December 16, 1966	2002-01-21	February 7, 2006	
133	Mohamed Ibrahim Awzar	Khouribga	September 28, 1979	2002-01-20	July 31, 2004	There is no record that a CSR Tribunal was convened for this captive.
150	Said Boujaadia	Casablanca	May 5, 1968	February 7, 2002	2008-04-30	Alleged to have been associated with Al Wafa, and the Libyan Islamic Fighting Group.; Alleged to have attended military training camps in Afghanistan.
160	Muhammad Ben Moujan	Casablanca	February 14, 1981	2002-01-15	October 11, 2006	Alleged to have attended a military training camp in Afghanistan.
197	Yunis Abdurrahman Shokuri	Safi	April 5, 1968	2002-05-01	September 16, 2015	Alleged to be associated with the Moroccan Islamic Fighting Group and Jama'at Al-Tablighi.; Reported to have been repatriated on October 12, 2006, and again on September 16, 2015.; Had a thirty-day protective order showing he was still in Guantanamo on July 15, 2008.
237	Mohammed Souleimani Laalami	Casablanca	March 4, 1965	2002-02-08	February 7, 2006	Claimed he was beaten into uttering false confessions.
244	Abdul Latif Nasir	Casablanca	March 4, 1965	2002-05-03	July 19, 2021	
294	Mohammed Mizouz	Casablanca	December 31, 1973	2002-06-14	July 31, 2004	Repatriated to Morocco in August 2004 with four other Moroccans.; Released on parole, but subsequently re-arrested on November 11, 2005.; Mizouz reported guards had urinated on the Koran.
499	Radwan Al Shakouri	Safi	February 12, 1972	2002-05-01	July 31, 2004	
534	Tarek Dergoul	Mile End, UK	December 11, 1977	2002-05-05	March 9, 2004	
587	Ibrahim Bin Shakaran	Casablanca	August 4, 1979	2002-05-03	July 31, 2004	Repatriated to Morocco in August 2004 with four other Moroccans.; Released on parole, but subsequently re-arrested on November 11, 2005.
590	Ahmed Rashidi	Tangier	March 16, 1966	2002-06-14	April 28, 2007	An investigator hired by Rashidi's lawyer was able to find pay stubs that proved Rashidi was working as a chef in London when American intelligence analysts alleged he was attending the al Farouq training camp, in Afghanistan.
