= Center for the Study of Human Rights in the Americas =

University human rights center

The Center for the Study of Human Rights in the Americas (CSHRA, the 'Davis Group') was a university human rights center located at the University of California, Davis. The CSHRA was housed within UC Davis' Hemispheric Institute on the Americas. Founded in 2005 and in operation until at least 2013, its website states that it was an "academic initiative for the comprehensive study of human rights across the American continent". The CSHRA operated two main programs, The Guantánamo Testimonials Project, which collected from public sources the testimonials of those involved in the Guantanamo Bay detention camp, ranging from prisoners to guards, FBI agents, military psychologists, etc., and the Neurobiology of Psychological Torture project, which investigated the neurobiology of psychological torture, including at Guantanamo Bay.

The CSHRA, sometimes referred to as the Davis Group, was notable for its research on the Guantanamo Bay detention camp, including breaking the story that the Guantanamo Bay detention camp was holding 12 children, four more than the US was stating at the time, and then 15 children, three more than the US was claiming at the time. The CSHRA repeatedly called for a public investigation into post-9/11 U.S. detention policies and practices. The CSHRA also compiled a book, The Trauma of Psychological Torture, published by Praeger Publishers.

== See also ==
- Guantanamo Bay detention camp
- List of Guantanamo Bay detainees
- List of juveniles held at the Guantanamo Bay detention camp
- University human rights centers
