= Abdul Rahman Noorani =

Afghan Guantanamo detainee

- Born: 1973 (age 51–52)
- Arrested: January 2002; Pakistan; Pakistan Armed Forces
- Released: July 16, 2003; Afghanistan
- Citizenship: Afghanistan
- Detained at: Guantanamo Bay detainment camp
- ISN: 582
- Status: Repatriated

Abdul Rahman Noorani is a citizen of Afghanistan who was held in extrajudicial detention in the United States Guantanamo Bay detainment camps, in Cuba. His Internment Serial Number was 582.

He was repatriated on July 16, 2003.

== Claims he "returned to the fight" ==
The Defense Intelligence Agency would later assert that during an Al Jazeera interview from October 7, 2001, he was identified as the “deputy defense minister of the Taliban.” He had been arrested by Pakistani troops and handed over to US forces. The DIA would also identify him later as a "former Guantanamo captive who returned to the fight":

Abdul Rahman Noor: Noor was released in July of 2003, and has since participated in fighting against US forces near Kandahar. After his release, Noor was identified as the person in an October 7, 2001, video interview with al-Jazeerah TV network, wherein he is identified as the “deputy defense minister of the Taliban.” In this interview, he described the defensive position of the mujahideen and claimed they had recently downed an airplane.
