= Shamil Khadzhiyev =

Russian former Guantanamo Bay detainee (born 1971)

- Born: April 23, 1971 (age 55); Avzion, Russia
- Released: 2004-02-27
- Detained at: Guantanamo
- Other names: Almas Sharipov; Almaz Sharipov; Abdur Razakah; Shamil Khazhiev; Shamil Khadzhiev; Shamil Khazhiyev
- ISN: 209
- Charge(s): No charge, held in extrajudicial detention
- Status: Repatriated

Shamil Khadzhiyev (born 1971), Russian: Шамиль Хажиев also Shamil Hajiyev, who called himself Almas Sharipov during interrogations, is a citizen of Russia who was held in extrajudicial detention in the United States's Guantanamo Bay detention camps, in Cuba. Hajiyev is a Muslim from Bashkortostan. Hajiyev served as a detective in Tatarstan and a law student at Ufa State University, until his disappearance in 1999.

Hajiyev, and six other Russian Guantanamo detainees, were repatriated to Russia, where they faced charges of illegal border crossing, being members of a criminal group and being a mercenary in an armed conflict. His Guantanamo Internment Serial Number was 209.

== Repatriation ==
Sharipov, and seven other men were held in Guantanamo. Sharipov was reported to have been repatriated on February 24, 2004, with six other Russian men.

== Request for Asylum in the Netherlands ==
Shamil Khazhiev arrived in the Netherlands on March 26, 2007, where he requested political asylum. In his request for asylum was based on his assertion that he was a "victim of harassment by Russian intelligence". Russian security officials confirmed he had been "under watch", but denied the harassment claims. Netherlands officials housed Khazhiev in the Ter Apel refugee accommodation center. Human Rights Watch reports the Netherlands did grant him asylum.
