= Faris Muslim al Ansari =

Afghan Guantanamo Bay detainee

- Born: 1984 (age 41–42); Mukala, Yemen
- Detained at: Guantanamo
- Other name: Faris Muslim Alansari
- ISN: 253
- Charge: No charge (held in extrajudicial detention)
- Status: Repatriated 2007-12-28

Faris Muslim al Ansari is a citizen of Afghanistan who was seventeen years old when captured and held in the United States's Guantanamo Bay detention camps, in Cuba. His Guantanamo Internment Serial Number was 253. American intelligence analysts estimate that Al Ansari was born in 1984 in Mukala, Yemen.

== Combatant Status Review Tribunal ==
Combatant Status Review Tribunals were held in a 3 x 5 meter trailer. The captive sat with his hands and feet shackled to a bolt in the floor. Three chairs were reserved for members of the press, but only 37 of the 574 Tribunals were observed.

Initially the Bush administration asserted that they could withhold all the protections of the Geneva Conventions to captives from the war on terror. This policy was challenged before the Judicial branch. Critics argued that the USA could not evade its obligation to conduct competent tribunals to determine whether captives are, or are not, entitled to the protections of prisoner of war status.

Subsequently the Department of Defense instituted the Combatant Status Review Tribunals. The Tribunals, however, were not authorized to determine whether the captives were lawful combatants—rather they were merely empowered to make a recommendation as to whether the captive had previously been correctly determined to match the Bush administration's definition of an enemy combatant. Al Ansari chose to participate in his Combatant Status Review Tribunal.

=== allegations ===
The allegations Al Ansari faced during his Tribunal were:

a. The detainee is a Taliban fighter.
1. The detainee lived with his family in Kabul, Afghanistan.
2. The detainee's home was given to his father by the Taliban.
3. The detainee's father was given rewards for his service to the Taliban.

b. The detainee participated in military operations against the coalition.
1. The detainee fought in the Mehjin Region in Tora Bora.
2. While fighting in the Mehjin Region in Tora Bora, the detainee carried a Kalashnikov rifle and an RPG-7.
3. While engaged in commbat with the Northern Alliance, the detainee fired his Kalashnikov rifle and RPG-7.
4. The detainee was captured without identification as he attempted to flee into Afghanistan.

== Administrative Review Board hearing ==
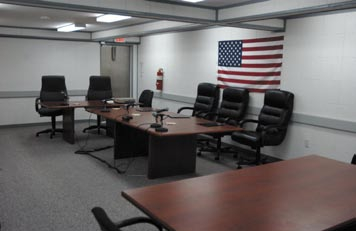
Hearing room where Guantanamo captive's annual Administrative Review Board hearings convened for captives whose Combatant Status Review Tribunal had already determined they were an "enemy combatant".

Detainees who were determined to have been properly classified as "enemy combatants" were scheduled to have their dossier reviewed at annual Administrative Review Board hearings. The Administrative Review Boards weren't authorized to review whether a detainee qualified for POW status, and they weren't authorized to review whether a detainee should have been classified as an "enemy combatant".

They were authorized to consider whether a detainee should continue to be detained by the United States, because they continued to pose a threat—or whether they could safely be repatriated to the custody of their home country, or whether they could be set free.

The transcript from Al Ansari's Administrative Review Board hearing show he initially planned to participate in his hearing. However, he changed his mind when he asked his Assisting Military Officer, who would be attending the hearing. His Assisting Military Officer said he didn't tell him how many officers would be attending, but he confirmed for him that there wouldn't be any lawyers present.

The transcript records the Presiding Officer asking the Designated Military Officer about two individuals, named in the factors favoring Al Ansari's continued detention, who were both associated with guest houses in Kandahar, had similarly spelled names. One was named "Abu Kaloud" and the other was named "Abu Kalood Al Yemeni". The Designated Military Officer said he thought they were the same individual, but he would have to double-check.

Al Ansari had tried to call for the testimony of an individual named Abu Jahad Al-Yemani during his Tribunal.

== Medical records ==
On March 16, 2007 the Department of Defense published height and weight records for all but ten of the captives held in Guantanamo. Faris Muslim Al Ansari is one of ten men whose height and weight records were withheld. The Department of Defense has not offered an explanation for why no records for those ten men were published.

== Repatriation ==
The Department of Defense published the dates captives departed from Guantanamo on 26 November 2008. According to that list Faris al-Ansari was repatriated on December 28, 2007.

On January 9, 2009 the Department of Defense published the records for the third set of Administrative Review Board hearings, conducted in 2007 and early 2008. According to those records no review was scheduled for Al-Ansari in 2007. According to the records of the 2005 and 2006 Board hearings, those boards had not recommended his repatriation. Like the nine other men Al-Ansari was repatriated in spite of the Office for the Administrative Review of Detained Enemy Combatants recommending his continued detention in US custody.

== See also ==
- Minors detained in the War on Terror
