= Shahzada (Taliban commander) =

Afghan terrorist and Guantanamo Bay detainee

- Born: 1960; Afghanistan
- Arrested: 26 November 2001; Kunduz; Northern Alliance
- Released: 8 May 2003; Kabul
- Died: 7 May 2004
- Detained at: Sheberghan Prison; Kandahar; Guantanamo Bay detention camp
- Other name: Mohammed Yusif Yaqub
- ISN: 367
- Status: Released, reengaged, and then killed.
- Parents: Mohammad Gul Aka (father)

Shahzada Akhund (1960 – 7 May 2004), known also by the title Mullah, was a Taliban militant commander who was held at Guantanamo Bay following the 2001 ouster of the Taliban regime in Afghanistan. He used a false name, Mohammed Yusif Yaqub, and pretended to be an innocent civilian.

He succeeded in convincing the Americans that he posed no threat and was released. He subsequently rejoined the Taliban, fighting the U.S. forces in Afghanistan. He died in combat in 2004.

== Prior to United States invasion of Afghanistan ==
Shahzada was from Mira Khor, a small village in the Maywand district of Kandahar Province, southern Afghanistan. He was from the Tarakai tribe, and his father was Mohammad Gul Aka. He was born in 1960. He was educated at a madrassa in Pakistan.

In 2001, a Mullah Shahzada was reported as a member of the Taliban delegation charged with the responsibility of the destruction of statues. The term mullah is primarily understood in the Muslim world as a term of respect for an educated religious man. There was at least one other contemporary "Mullah Shahzada" active among the Taliban in Afghanistan.^{[*]}

A report by the U.N. Commission on Human Rights, identified a Mullah Shahzad Kandahari ("Kandahari" refers to hailing from Kandahar) as being involved in a massacre in Rabatak, in Samangan province. According to a human rights organisations, he was the commander of Khinjan front, north of Kabul, and was allegedly responsible for the execution of 31 civilian detainees near the Rabatak Pass in May 2000. The following year, in January 2001, following the Taliban recapture of Yakawlang in Bamyan province from the United Front, the U.N. alleged he was involved in the killing of several hundred civilians, including a U.N staff member and a number of aid agency workers.

== United States invasion of Afghanistan ==
Following the United States invasion of Afghanistan, and the surrender of the Taliban forces holding Kunduz, in northern Afghanistan, Shahzada was captured by Northern Alliance forces on 26 November 2001. He pretended to be an innocent rug merchant captured by mistake and used a false name, Mohammed Yusif Yaqub. In reality, he had been a Taliban officer during the invasion. He was transported to Sheberghan Prison, where he was held for seven weeks, before being handed over to the United States at Kandahar. He was later transferred to Guantanamo Bay detention camp, arriving on 15 June 2002, where he was given the Internment Serial Number (ISN) 367.

During his time in Guantanamo, he was consistent and stuck to his cover story about being a rug merchant. Ultimately, he was successful in convincing the American authorities that he was not a Taliban leader and that he did not pose a threat to U.S. interests. As a result, in December 2002, Shahzada was recommended for release. This occurred on 8 May 2003, and he was flown to Kabul. Gul Agha Sherzai, the post-Taliban governor of Kandahar, has said that Afghan offers of help in identifying known Talibans, which might have shown Shahzada's cover story to be false, were repeatedly rejected.

Once back in Afghanistan, he returned to combat as a commander, recruiting fighters using stories of established poor treatment at the hands of the Americans in Guanatanamo as a recruiting tool. He was also behind a significant prison break: in October 2003 he arranged for forty-one Taliban prisoners to escape from Sarposa prison, including the brother of the Taliban defence minister. The New York Times reported that after his return to fighting, he was responsible for the operations that killed at least thirteen people, including two aid workers.

Newsweek named him Mullah Shahzada Akhund, describing him as a senior leader. They placed him in the Arghandab district, near Kandahar, where he met with the leader of the Taliban, Mohammed Omar, ten days before his death. He died 7 May 2004. His death has variously been described as occurring in action against the U.S. and as being an accident. Newsweek, whose report is the most detailed, refers to it as a friendly-fire incident. He died in Nalgham, near Kandahar.

== Other mentions of a Mullah Shahzada ==
Two days before the release from Guantanamo of ISN 367, who was released on 8 May 2003, The New York Times reported in an article about the resurgence of the Taliban in an interview with a "religious teacher and former fighter" named Mullah Shahzada, in Quetta, Pakistan. This Shahzada was reported as coming from Helmand province, not Kandahar province.

The People's Daily reports that a Mullah Shahzada was injured during a firefight in Helmand province in October 2005.
