= Abdullah Mehsud =

Pakistani militant commander

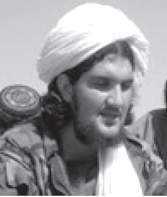
- Abdullah Mehsud from his US "most wanted poster".
- Born: Alam Mehsud; 1977; Nano Village, South Waziristan
- Died: 24 July 2007 (aged 29–30); Balochistan, Pakistan
- Detained at: Guantanamo
- Other name: Alam Mehsud (birth name)
- ISN: 92
- Alleged to be a member of: Tehreek-e-Taliban Pakistan (Pakistani Taliban)
- Charge(s): No charge, held in extrajudicial detention
- Status: Released, "returned to the battlefield", KIA

Abdullah Mehsud (Pashto: عبدالله مهسود; Urdu: عبدالله محسود; 1977 – 24 July 2007) was a Pashtun militant commander who was killed by Pakistani Army in Zhob after security forces raided his dwelling in Zhob, Balochistan, Pakistan. He belonged to the Mahsud tribe.

American authorities later claimed that he had originally been a prisoner in the Guantanamo Bay detainment camps, who was judicially released and subsequently "returned to terrorism".

== Early life ==
Abdullah Mehsud (Muhammad Alam Mahsud) was born in 1977 in Nano village of South Waziristan, and was a Pashtun, part of the Mehsud tribe's SlimiKhel clan in South Waziristan which is the homeland of the Meshud tribe located in northwest Pakistan. Abdullah Mehsud fought against the Northern Alliance and lost a leg to a landmine in 1996.

== Capture ==
During the opening days of Operation Enduring Freedom, Mehsud fought against U.S. and Northern Alliance forces in Afghanistan. In December 2001, he surrendered to the Uzbek warlord Abdul Rashid Dostum in the Battle of Kunduz. He was handed over to the U.S. and spent 25 months in Guantanamo Bay detention camp, where he was fitted with a prosthetic limb. He was released by the U.S. and returned to South Waziristan.

== Relationship with Baitullah Mehsud ==
Abdullah Mehsud had no relationship with Baitullah Mehsud, a tribal leader of the Mehsud tribe. Other sources merely assert that they were clansmen, or associates. Islam Online reports that Baitullah suspected that Abdullah was a double agent.

== Post-release ==
=== Return to the battlefield ===
After his release, Mehsud immediately began rebuilding his Pakistani Taliban (Tehreek-e-Taliban Pakistan or TTP) cadre. He commanded a force of up to 5,000 Taliban fighters. He then began initiating attacks on coalition soldiers in Afghanistan.

In Waziristan, Mehsud was believed to be behind the kidnapping of two Chinese engineers from the building of the Gomal Zam Dam, which left one hostage dead during a botched rescue attempt. He was also alleged to have been behind an attack on Pakistan's Interior Minister Aftab Ahmad Sherpao that killed 31 people.

In March 2005, a Department of Defense document claimed:

Mahsud, now reputed to be a militant leader, claimed to be an office clerk and driver for the Taliban from 1996 to 1998 or 1999. He consistently denied having any affiliation with al Qaida. He also claimed to have received no weapons or military training due to his handicap (an amputation resulting from when he stepped on a land mine 10 years ago). He claimed that after 11 September 2001 he was forcibly conscripted by the Taliban military.

In 2005, Pakistani President Pervez Musharraf announced that Mehsud had been killed by ISI forces, only to later retract the statement.

Mehsud was one of the first three former Guantanamo captives the Bush Presidency reported had returned to the battlefield. As of July 2007, spokesmen reported that over thirty captives had returned to the battlefield, or associated with terrorists, after their release. As of July 2007, the spokesmen had named seven of those individuals.

=== Promise to never surrender ===
Sikh Spectrum reported that during a telephone interview in 2004, Abdullah Mehsud promised to never surrender.

=== Claims of returning to terrorism ===
The Defense Intelligence Agency asserted Abdullah Mahsud had "returned to terrorism". The DIA reported:

Abdullah Mahsud blew himself up to avoid capture by Pakistani forces in July 2007. According to a Pakistani government official, Mahsud directed a suicide attack in April 2007 that killed 31 people. After being transferred to Afghanistan in March 2004, Mahsud sought several media interviews and became well known for his attacks in Pakistan. In October 2004, he kidnapped two Chinese engineers and claimed responsibility for an Islamabad hotel bombing.

== Death ==
On 24 July 2007, Mehsud was at a house with other militants in Zhob, Balochistan. A team of Pakistani law enforcement agencies conducted a raid on the house where he was staying. Abdullah Mehsud was shot by soldiers. He was holding a grenade in hand intended to kill the soldiers but he fell down due to injuries and blown by grenade During the raid, several other militants were killed, Abdul Rahman Mehsud and Muhammad Azam, were captured along with a local Pakistani Taliban leader.
