= Ibrahim Bin Shakaran =

Moroccan Guantanamo Bay detainee (1979–2014)

- Born: August 4, 1979 (age 47); Casablanca, Morocco
- Died: April 2, 2014; Syria
- Citizenship: Morocco
- Detained at: Guantanamo
- Other name: Brahim Benchekroun
- ISN: 587
- Charge(s): No charge, extrajudicial detention
- Status: Died in fighting

Ibrahim Bin Shakaran (August 4, 1979 – April 2, 2014) was a citizen of Morocco who was held in extrajudicial detention in the United States's Guantanamo Bay detention camps, in Cuba. His Guantanamo Internment Serial Number was 587.

Ibrahim Bin Shakaran was repatriated to Moroccan custody on July 31, 2004, on the eve of the first Combatant Status Review Tribunals. The three other men were Mohammed Ibrahim Awzar, Mohammed Mizouz, and Radwan al Shakouri. The four were all charged by Moroccan authorities; then released on bail. The BBC reports a fifth man, Abdellah Tabarak, was repatriated with the four others.

He was reported to have led an anti-Assad group, in Syria, named Harakat Sham al-Islam, which was staffed mainly by fellow Moroccans. He was reported to have died, fighting in Syria, in 2014.

== Association with Mana Shaman Allabardi Al Tabi ==
The Summary of Evidence memo prepared for Mana Shaman Allabardi Al Tabi's first annual Administrative Review Board, on July 18, 2005, stated:

1. One of the individuals the detainee was arrested with was named Ibrahim Bin Shakaran.
2. Ibrahim Bin Shakran trained at the al Farouk training camp and fought on the Taliban front lines.

=== Formerly secret Joint Task Force Guantanamo assessment ===
On April 25, 2011, whistleblower organization WikiLeaks published formerly secret assessments drafted by Joint Task Force Guantanamo analysts. His 2-page Joint Task Force Guantanamo assessment was drafted on December 13, 2003. It was signed by camp commandant Major General Geoffrey D. Miller. He recommended continued detention.

== Moroccan arrest ==
According to Fox News "Brahim Benchekroun" and Mohammed Mazouz, and fifteen other Moroccans who were not former Guantanamo captives, were rounded up on November 11, 2005.

== Defense Intelligence Agency claims he "returned to terrorism" ==
The Defense Intelligence Agency asserted Ibrahim Bin Shakaran had "returned to terrorism". The DIA reported:

- that in September 2007 he was convicted in a Moroccan court for recruiting fighters for Al Qaida in Iraq in 2005;
- that he was working to create an al Qaida in the Lands of the Maghreb;
- that he was coordinating "sleeper cells" to go for training and return to Morocco.

== Death ==
Bin Shakaran, under the transliteration of his name "Brahim Benchekroun", was killed in Syria in 2014. He was killed by Syrian Army sniper in a rebel offensive.
