= Isa Khan (Guantanamo detainee 23) =

Pakistani Guantanamo Bay detainee

- Citizenship: Pakistan
- Detained at: Guantanamo
- ISN: 23
- Charge: No charge (held in extrajudicial detention)
- Status: Repatriated and rearrested

Isa Khan is a citizen of Pakistan who was held in extrajudicial detention in the United States Guantanamo Bay detention camps, in Cuba. His Guantanamo Internment Serial Number was 23.

On July 6, 2010, he was arrested again in Bannu, Pakistan, for allegedly rejoining the Taliban. He was believed to be a commander in a group associated with bombings.

== Time magazine article ==
In October 2002, Issa Khan was the subject of a Time magazine article.

Khan's first letter from Guantanamo, received by his family almost a year after his capture, was one of the first letters from a Guantanamo captive to be publicized. It began

"Kind Father, Mother & Sisters. I'm in the United States. I've been arrested. I hope I'll be released soon, since I'm innocent."

His family described Khan as a homeopathic doctor, who had traveled to Mazari Sharif with his new wife to show off their new baby to her family there, when war struck, and he was rounded up Northern Alliance forces because he was a member of the Pashtun ethnic group.

== Human Rights Watch letter ==
Human Rights Watch issued a "Letter to President General Pervez Musharraf" calling on the Bush administration to "release detainees who were Taliban soldiers or who have no connection to al-Qaeda, and who are not being prosecuted for war crimes or other serious international offenses." The letter referred to Khan as a "homeopathic doctor from Bannu District in the North West Frontier Province of Pakistan who, American and Pakistani officials have privately admitted to Human Rights Watch, has no connection to the Taliban or al-Qaeda."

== Repatriation and Pakistani detention ==
Following his repatriation, he was imprisoned and investigated by Pakistani security authorities.

Khan has been granted a kind of extrajudicial conditional release by Pakistani officials. Khan's conditional release is not like parole, granted by judicial authorities, following a conviction during a trial, as neither the American or Pakistani authorities ever laid any criminal charges against him, or granted him a trial.

According to an article in the January 7, 2006, edition of the Houston Chronicle Khan says he has considered committing suicide because the Pakistani government continues to monitor him.

== McClatchy interview ==
On June 15, 2008, the McClatchy News Service published an article on each of 66 former Guantanamo captives they interviewed. Issa Khan was one of the captives interviewed.

In the interview Khan acknowledged that his father-in-law was a Taliban appointed judge. He was repatriated to Pakistani custody in September 2004—that is, while the Combatant Status Review Tribunals were in process.

His Pakistani interrogators told him his wife had been killed in 2001, and that his infant sone had disappeared. McClatchy reporters had been allowed access to his Pakistani security dossier, which stated he had been cleared of suspicion of involvement with the Taliban.

Issa Khan reported he was captured by Pakistani police at a road-block—not on a battlefield. He reported being abused, both by his initial Pakistani captors and by Americans in Afghanistan. He reported that female interrogators told him they were smearing their menses on him. He reported that he and other captives retaliated by throwing their bodily fluids on some of the guards.

== Pentagon claim he had "reengaged in terrorism" ==
On May 20, 2009, the New York Times, citing an unreleased Pentagon document, reported that Department of Defense officials claimed Isa Khan was one of 74 former Guantanamo captives who was "suspected" of having "engaged in terrorism or militant activity." On May 27, 2009, the Defense Intelligence Agency published a fact sheet entitled "Former Guantanamo Detainee Terrorism Trends" that named Isa Khan as being suspected of having "reengaged in terrorism". According to the document he was suspected of an "association with Tehrik-i-Taliban".
