= Ravil Fazleyev =

Russian ice hockey player

- Born: February 15, 1960 (age 66) Kazan, Soviet Union
- Height: 6 ft 0 in (183 cm)
- Weight: 181 lb (82 kg; 12 st 13 lb)
- Position: Defence
- Shot: Left
- Played for: Gorky Torpedo; SK Uritskogo Kazan
- Playing career: 1984–1989

Ravil Shamsiyevich Fazleyev (Russian: Равиль Шамсиевич Фазлеев; born February 15, 1960) is a Russian former professional ice hockey defenceman. He played 11 games with the Gorky Torpedo of the Soviet Championship League during the 1986–87 season.

== Personal ==
His son, Radel Fazleyev, was selected by the Philadelphia Flyers in the 6th round (168th overall) of the 2014 NHL entry draft.
