= Furkat Yusupov =

Uzbek Islamist terrorist

Furkat Kasimovich Yusupov (born 1980) is a citizen of Uzbekistan who was arrested for, charged with, and tried for terrorism offenses in 2004. Yusupov was described as being the leader of a group that executed a series of terrorist bombings on March 28, 2004. Authorities claimed Yusupov was captured with ten homemade bombs. Uzbekistan officials said that Yusupov was a member of Hizb ut-Tahrir. Yusupov was from Toitep a community 40 kilometers from Tashkent.

Accorind to United Press International the series of attacks Yusupov was convicted of playing a role in represented the first use of suicide bombers in Central Asia. They reported Yusupov himself was wearing a suicide belt when he was captured. Kamola, Yusupov's wife, also stood trial, and received a sentence of ten years of hard labor, for sewing 60 suicide belts.

Two of Yusupov's brothers died during the security officials attempts to apprehend the group. Another of his brothers was apprehended and stood trial with him. The Agonist reported that Yusupov stood trial with 14 other individuals on July 26, 2004. Yusupov pleaded guilty. According to The Agonist his confession included:

- "I have helped to send 14 people to be trained in Pakistan and Kazakhstan."
- "We have been trained (on) how to disguise ourselves in big cities, carry out close and distance fighting with police, carry out suicide bombings and prepare explosives."
- "I regret that I have done so much trouble for my family and my country. I am ready to face even the death penalty but I ask you to pardon me."

Yusupov's trial was disrupted by an additional suicide bombing on July 30, 2004. A citizen of Kazakhstan named Avaz Shoyusupov blew himself up in the Prosecutor's office, killing five other individuals, and disrupting the trial. Yusupov identified Shoyusupov as a member of his cell.

== Guantanamo connection ==
The Summary of Evidence memo prepared for Yakub Abahanov's Administrative Review Board justified his continued detention on an allegation that he had a tie to Yusupov.:

"On 24 August 2004, the Uzbek Supreme Court convicted and sentenced Furkat Kasimovich Yusupov to 18 years deprivation of freedom for his involvement in terrorist attacks in Tashkent and Bukhara Provinces, Uzbekistan, during March and April 2004."

Yakub Abahanov's Summary of Evidence also justified his continued detention due to alleged ties to an individuals identified as "Yusupov Parkhat" and "Farhat Yusupov".

On August 7, 2002 Alisher Muradov and Farkhat Yusupov co-wrote an article entitled: "The borders of problems and worries" published in the Kyrgyzstan edition of Russian newspaper Moskovskij Komsomolets.
