= İbrahim Şen =

Turkish former Guantanamo Bay detainee (born 1980)

- Born: 1 October 1980 (age 46); Van, Turkey
- Released: November 2003; Turkey
- Citizenship: Turkey
- Detained at: Guantanamo
- ISN: 297

İbrahim Şen (born 1 October 1980) is a Kurdish citizen of Turkey who was held in extrajudicial detention in the United States's Guantanamo Bay detention camps in Cuba. The Defense Intelligence Agency reports that following İbrahim Şen's repatriation he "returned to terrorism".

Şen was interviewed in April 2006 by a Turkish newspaper Vakit. Şen reported that female interrogators sexually abused him and desecrated the Koran, and that guards beat him with iron bars and allowed him to be mauled by dogs when he was in the Kandahar detention facility. He reported that camp authorities would amputate wounded limbs rather than trying to provide less radical medical care. Şen reported being left for days in what he called "the insanity room", where captives were subjected to loud noise. Şen also claimed that most GIs in Guantanamo were Jewish and wore skullcaps and that a Rabbi was present during each interrogation. A Turkish columnist, Aslı Aydintaşbaş, criticized Şen for the "crude antisemitism" he showed in his interview. Şen and several other former captives are suing several current and former US officials for the inhumane and illegal conditions of their detention. The other former captives include two other former Turkish captives: Yuksel Celikgogus, Nuri Mert, a former Uzbek named Zakirjan Hasam, and a former Algerian captive Fethi Boucetta. Like Sen, the two other Turkish captives were repatriated prior to the institution of the Combatant Status Review Tribunals, in August 2004. The Algerian and Uzbek were among the 38 captives who were freed after their CSR Tribunals determined they never should have been classified as "enemy combatants". According to the DIA, İbrahim Şen was transferred to Turkey in November 2003. In January 2008, Şen was arrested in Van, Turkey, and charged as the leader of an active al-Qaeda cell.
