= List of juveniles held at the Guantanamo Bay detention camp =

Juveniles held at the Guantanamo Bay detention camp numbered fifteen, according to a 2011 study by the Center for the Study of Human Rights in the Americas at the University of California Davis. The U.S. State Department had publicly acknowledged twelve. The US Department of Defense defined minors at Guantanamo as those below the age of 16, whereas they are defined as below the age of 18 in international law. Three juveniles aged below 16 were held in Camp Iguana, but others between 16 and 18 were put into the general population and treated as adults. These included Omar Khadr, a Canadian citizen who was 15 when captured and one of the youngest detainees, 16 when transported to Guantanamo.

== May 2008 report to the United Nations ==
On May 15, 2008 the American Civil Liberties Union published a report that the George W. Bush administration had submitted to the United Nations Committee on the Rights of the Child. The report stated that the USA had apprehended 2500 juveniles, 2400 of them in Iraq. It said that a total of ten juveniles had been held in the Bagram Theater Detention Facility in Afghanistan and that eight juveniles had been held in the Guantanamo Bay detention camps.

== List of known juveniles held at the Guantanamo Bay detention camps ==
Department of Defense documents acknowledge that at least fifteen children were at one time imprisoned at Guantanamo:

Name	ISN	Date of birth	Transferred to Guantanamo	Age in years at transfer
Mohammed Ismail	930	-- -- 88	07 Feb 02	13 - 14
Assad Ullah	912	-- -- 88	-- Dec 02	13 - 14
Naqib Ullah	913	-- -- 88	-- Jan 03	14 - 15
Mohammed el Gharani	269	-- -- 86	09 Feb 02	15 - 16
Mohammed Omar	540	-- -- 86	11 Jun 02	15 - 16
Shams Ullah	783	-- -- 86	27 Oct 02	15 - 16
Omar Ahmed Khadr	766	19 Sep 86	27 Oct 02	16
Yussef Mohammed Mubarak al Shihri	114	08 Sep 85	16 Jan 02	16
Abdul Samad	911	-- -- 86	06 Feb 03	16 - 17
Abdul Qudus	929	-- -- 86	07 Feb 03	16 - 17
Ibrahim Umar al Umar	585	-- -- 85	15 Jun 02	16 - 17
Abdul Salam Ghetan (al Shehri)	132	14 Dec 84	20 Jan 02	17
Yasser Talal Al Zahrani	093	22 Sep 84	20 Jan 02	17
Khalil Rahman Hafez (Hafez K. Rahman)	301	20 Feb 84	07 Feb 02	17
'Abd al Razaq (Abdullah Razzaq)	067	18 Jan 84	17 Jan 02	17

In addition, the UC Davis report lists six detainees who might have been 17 at the time of transfer to Guantanamo:

Name	ISN	Date of birth	Transferred to Guantanamo	Age in years at transfer
Mohamed Jawad	900	-- -- 85	06 Feb 03	17 - 18
Qari Esmhatulla	591	-- -- 84	10 Jun 02	17 - 18
Sajin Urayman	545	-- -- 84	13 Jun 02	17 - 18
Faris Muslim al Ansari	253	-- -- 84	17 Jun 02	17 - 18
Peta Muhammed	908	-- -- 84	05 Aug 02	17 - 18
Mahbub Rahman	1052	-- -- 85	21 Nov 03	17 - 18

== See also ==
- Military use of children
