= Mohamed Mazouz =

Moroccan Guantanamo detainee

- Born: December 31, 1973 (age 52); Casablanca, Morocco
- Detained at: Kandahar detention facility Bagram; Guantanamo
- ISN: 294
- Charge: No charge
- Status: Released

Mohamed Mazouz is a citizen of Morocco who was held in extrajudicial detention in the United States Guantanamo Bay detention camps, in Cuba. His Guantanamo Internment Serial Number was 294. Joint Task Force Guantanamo counter-terrorism analysts report he was born on December 31, 1973, in Casablanca, Morocco. He was designated as a terrorist entity by the Moroccan Ministry of Justice in 2023, and an international arrest warrant has been issued for his arrest for alleged terrorist acts.

== Release ==
Mazouz was one of the 201 Guantanamo captives released prior to the completion of the Combatant Status Review Tribunals that were initiated in August 2004, following the United States Supreme Court's ruling in Rasul v. Bush.

== April 2005 interview ==
During an interview on April 11, 2005, in the La Gazette du Maroc Mazouz described his capture, and the conditions of his detention and interrogation. According to Mazouz he had gone to Pakistan to get married. He was arrested in Pakistan, by Pakistani authorities, on August 26, 2001, while walking with his brother-in-law in Karachi.

He said he hadn't heard from his wife since his capture, and didn't know what had happened to her.

Mazouz described cruel treatment in Pakistani custody. He described being transferred to American custody in the Kandahar detention facility.

I underwent every form of torture from the Pakistani authorities, without the police having laid any charge against me. I was tortured and I did not even know for what reason I was arrested. Nobody told me the reason for my presence in this horrible prison. We were beaten, trampled underfoot, kept without food, without water, being unable to wash ourselves, being unable to cut our beard and hair, agglutinated the ones on the others, under inhuman conditions. The most important thing to raise here is that all of us were put in chains of iron using a steel stick which bound our feet to our belt. This literally paralyzed us. It was if we had a stake, stuck in our body. We ate with it, we relieved our natural needs with it and that lasted for several weeks. They removed these iron bars on the last day before the transfer to Kandahar.

According to Mazouz, his transfer to American custody was in December 2001. Prior to his transfer, he was visited by some Americans who said they were from Amnesty International, who he was sure were actually American counter-terrorism analysts.

Mazouz expressed dissatisfaction with efforts of the International Committee of the Red Cross on their behalf, and expressing suspicion that the Red Cross was assisting the American effort:

But I want to underline a point that your readers and the public opinion must know. The Red Cross did not do anything at all for us for all this period of detention in Afghanistan or in Guantanamo. Its presence was useless. The only thing that it did was to procure us some letters. I am even sure that they were there to serve the Americans and to bring assistance to them. In short, the Red Cross contented itself to play the role of postman and that's all.

Mazouz described brutal beatings in Kandahar, being exposed to the freezing cold winter weather, prior to interrogations, and the use of electric shock, during his interrogations, and immersions in freezing cold water.

Mazouz was then transferred to the Bagram Collection Point. Mazouz said that after his release, when he read about the Abu Ghraib torture and abuse that occurred in 2003 he recognized that all of these techniques were techniques used when he was being held in Bagram in 2002. He also described injections with psychotropic drugs.

And Mazouz described Americans in Bagram urinating on the Koran.

Mazouz said he was transferred to Guantanamo on June 15, 2006. Beatings by the guards, mystery injections continued. He also described all the captives suffering from painful hemorrhoids from the humiliating body cavity searches, forced enemas, and the introduction of drugs via the anus.

With very few exceptions, American spokesmen decline to address claims of abuse from specific Guantanamo captives. But, they have offered general assurances that American captives receive humane care and treatment.

== Moroccan arrest ==
Mazouz, another former Guantanamo captive named Brahim Benchekroun, and fifteen other Moroccans who were not former Guantanamo captives, were rounded up on November 11, 2005.

== Defense Intelligence Agency claims he "returned to terrorism" ==
The Defense Intelligence Agency asserted Ibrahim Bin Shakaran had "returned to terrorism".

The DIA reported:

Ibrahi Bin Shakaran and Mohammed Bin Ahmad Mizouz were transferred to Morocco in July 2004. In September 2007, they were convicted for their post-release involvement in a terrorist network recruiting Moroccans to fight for Abu-Musab al-Zarqawi's al-Qaida in Iraq (AQI). Recruits were to receive weapons and explosives training in Algeria from the Salafist Group for Preaching and Combat, which has since become al Qaida in the Lands of the Maghreb, before going to fight in Iraq or returning to Morocco as sleeper cells. The organizers of the group reportedly intended to create an al-Qaida-affiliated network in the Maghreb similar to AQI. According to testimony presented at the trial, Bin Shakaran had already recruited other jihadists when Moroccan authorities broke up the plot in November 2005. Bin Shakaran received a 10-year sentence for his role in the plot, while Mizouz received a two-year sentence.

Middle East Eye named Mazouz, Mohamed Alami, and Brahim Benchekroun, three former Guantanamo detainees who joined Harakat Sham al-Islam – an organization for Moroccans who planned to travel to Syria to fight in the conflict there.
