= Ufa State University =

Ufa State University may refer to:

- Ufa University of Science and Technology
- Ufa State Aviation Technical University
- Ufa State Petroleum Technological University
- Bashkir State Agrarian University
