= Shai Jahn Ghafoor =

There are multiple individuals named Abdul Ghaffar.

Maulvi Abdul Ghaffar (1969 – September 25, 2004) was an Afghan who was held by the United States in the Guantanamo Bay detainment camps, in Cuba. His Guantanamo Internment Serial Number was 363.

Born in 1969 in Karabagh, Ghazni Province, Shai Jahn Ghafoor was a citizen of Afghanistan. On September 9, 2001, he worked as a farmer and clay laborer in Karabakh village, Helmand Province, when he was forced by the Taliban to work as a supply driver in Taloqan to transport food supplies to frontlines in Takhar province. After the Fall of Kunduz in November 2001, he was arrested on November 26, 2001, and transported from Yarganak Pass through Mazar-i-Sharif to a prison in Sheberghan, Jowzjan. He spent nine months of detention in Guantanamo Bay Naval Base. He was released and repatriated to Afghanistan on March 23, 2003.

Maulvi Abdul Ghaffar has been cited as an example of a Guantanamo detainee who tricked their way out of imprisonment, so they could "return to the battlefield." Vice President Dick Cheney cited Ghaffar as a justification for continuing to detain suspects at Guantanamo.

Ghaffar was captured about two months after the US Invasion of Afghanistan, and according to various accounts, he was only held by the Americans for eight months.

After his release, Ghaffar served as a leader within the Taliban.

Ghaffar was killed along with two of his men in a gun battle during a raid on the night of September 25, 2004, in the village of Pishi, Uruzgan province. Ghaffar was believed to have been the Taliban commander for Uruzgan and Helmand provinces.
