= Rawil Menzeleýew =

Turkmen footballer

Personal information
- Date of birth: 1942 (age 83–84)
- Place of birth: Turkmenistan, USSR
- Height: 1.76 m (5 ft 9 1/2 in)
- Position: Midfielder

Senior career*
Years	Team	Apps	(Gls)
1965–1974	Stroitel Aşgabat	304	(38)

Managerial career
- 1999: Köpetdag Aşgabat
- * Club domestic league appearances and goals

Rawil Menzeleýew (Russian: Равиль Алиевич Мензелеев; born 1942 in Turkmenistan, USSR) is a Turkmenistan professional football player and manager.

== Career ==
In 1965 he began his professional career for the Soviet First League club Stroitel Aşgabat, in which he played to terminate career in 1974.

In 1999, he, together with Sergei Kazankov coached the Köpetdag Aşgabat, that occurred in a Turkmenistan higher league.
