= Mohammed Souleimani Laalami =

- Born: March 4, 1965; Casablanca
- Released: 2006; Morocco
- Died: 2013 (aged 47–48); Syria
- Citizenship: Morocco
- Detained at: Guantanamo
- ISN: 237
- Charge(s): no charge, extrajudicial detention
- Status: Died fighting in Syria

Mohammed Souleimani Laalami was a citizen of Morocco, who was held in extrajudicial detention in the United States Guantanamo Bay detainment camps, in Cuba. Laalami's Guantanamo detainee ID number is 237. The Department of Defense reports he was born on March 4, 1965, in Casablanca, Morocco.

== Official status reviews ==
Originally the Bush Presidency asserted that captives apprehended in the "war on terror" were not covered by the Geneva Conventions, and could be held indefinitely, without charge, and without an open and transparent review of the justifications for their detention. In 2004 the United States Supreme Court ruled, in Rasul v. Bush, that Guantanamo captives were entitled to being informed of the allegations justifying their detention, and were entitled to try to refute them.

=== Office for the Administrative Review of Detained Enemy Combatants ===
Combatant Status Review Tribunals were held in a 3x5 meter trailer where the captive sat with his hands and feet shackled to a bolt in the floor.

Following the Supreme Court's ruling the Department of Defense set up the Office for the Administrative Review of Detained Enemy Combatants.

Mohammed chose to participate in his Combatant Status Review Tribunal.

Most detainee's transcripts included the allegations against the detainee—Mohammed's did not.

Mohammed was confused over whether the Tribunal was a court of law, and wanted to know what crimes he was being charged with.

Mohammed denied that he was recruited in Morocco. Mohammed denied that he being trained at the al Farouq training camp. He claimed he made these confessions, in Afghanistan, when he was first captured, and was being beaten and threatened with death. He claimed both Afghans and Americans beat him during his interrogations in Afghanistan.

He denied being captured by the Northern Alliance in Tora Bora. He denied ever being in Tora Bora. He was captured in a village near Jalalabad. He denied possessing any weapons.

Mohammed traveled to Afghanistan, with his family, on a religious pilgrimage. When asked if he visited holy sites in Afghanistan he explained: "Pilgrimage can mean it is for religion, but I meant when you leave a place for good it is a pilgrimage."

=== Formerly secret Joint Task Force Guantanamo assessment ===
On April 25, 2011, whistleblower organization WikiLeaks published formerly secret assessments drafted by Joint Task Force Guantanamo analysts. His 2-page Joint Task Force Guantanamo assessment was drafted on December 27, 2003. It was signed by camp commandant Major General Geoffrey D. Miller. He recommended continued detention.

== Moroccan conviction ==
On November 10, 2006, Laalami and two other Moroccans said to be former Guantanamo detainees, were sentenced by a Moroccan court. Laalami, was sentenced for a five-year term, for starting a "criminal group". The other two Moroccans, named Najib Mohammad Lahassimi and Mohammed Ouali, were sentenced to three years for falsifying documents.

== Death fighting in Syria ==
Carol Rosenberg of the Miami Herald was the first to report that Laalami was the first former Guantanamo captive known to have died fighting in Syria. He was with Harakat Sham al-Islam, a faction not affiliated with al Qaeda or ISIS.
