= Rasul Kudayev =

Russian former Guantanamo Bay detainee (born 1984)

- Abdullah Kafkas's Guantanamo detainee assessment
- Born: January 23, 1984 (age 42); Prokhladny, Kabardino-Balkarian ASSR, Russian SFSR, Soviet Union
- Released: 2004-02-27
- Citizenship: Russia
- Detained at: Guantanamo
- Other name: Abdullah D. Kafkas
- ISN: 82
- Charge: No charge (held in extrajudicial detention)
- Status: Repatriated 2004-02-27

Rasul Kudayev (born January 23, 1984) is a Russian citizen who was held in extrajudicial detention in the United States Guantanamo Bay detention camp in Cuba.

== Early life ==
Rasul Kudayev was born in 1984 in the Russian republic of Kabardino-Balkaria.

In 1995, while a young teenager, Kudayev won a wrestling championship. He adopted the name Abdullah Kafkas and traveled to Central Asia to pursue a career in wrestling.

== Guantánamo detention ==
In November 2001, Kudayev traveled to Kunduz, Afghanistan, where he worked at an Arab medical clinic for foreign fighters, according to Guantánamo files released by WikiLeaks in 2011. He was arrested in Afghanistan and initially held at a prison in Mazar-i-Sharif before being transferred to Guantánamo around February 12, 2002. Military interrogators at Guantánamo quickly concluded that Kudayev had no ties to al-Qaeda or the Taliban and that the information he provided was not valuable. A dossier signed by Geoffrey Miller, the prison commander, on March 28, 2002, indicated that Kudayev had no further intelligence value. Despite this assessment, it took nearly two years for him to be released to the Russian government on February 27, 2004.

== Release ==
Kudayev, and six other Russian Guantánamo detainees (including Ruslan Odizhev who also lived in Nalchik), were repatriated to Russia, where they faced charges of illegal border crossing, being members of a criminal group and being a mercenary in an armed conflict, but were released without trial shortly after.

In 2005, he was arrested in Nalchik for allegedly taking part in the preparation of the rebel raid, and participation in the attack itself (taking the road police post in Khasanya suburb of Nalchik).

On December 2, 2008, he was reported to have been seriously ill. According to Human Rights Watch, Kudayev has yet to stand trial. They reported that he acquired serious liver disease in Guantanamo, which Russian authorities have declined to treat. They report that he was receiving medical treatment for his liver disease at the time authorities assert he was engaging in the Nalchik attack. They claim his confession was coerced through beatings and coercive interrogation techniques.

=== Detention in Russia ===
Kudayev was arrested in the southern Russian city of Nalchik following an assault on government facilities in October 2005. He was accused of leading a group responsible for the death of a police officer during the attack. According to his lawyers and family, he was tortured into signing a confession. He was transferred to FBU IZ-7/1, a remand center in Kabardino-Balkaria. The Washington Post reported he was apprehended: "in the southern Russian city of Nalchik after an assault on government facilities." Russian authorities have held him in extrajudicial detention—they have not laid any charges against him.

Amnesty International reported on March 11, 2011, that Kudayev’s health deteriorated significantly, presenting with a high fever, cough, and breathing difficulties. Doctors who treated Kudayev's lawyer faced extensive questioning, which likely discouraged local medical professionals from getting involved in his case.

In December 2014, the court case on the raid was still in progress.

=== Alleged recidivism ===
On May 20, 2009, the New York Times, citing an unreleased Pentagon document, reported that Department of Defense officials claimed Kudayev was one of 74 former Guantanamo captives who "are engaged in terrorism or militant activity."

A 2014 report by the New America Foundation identified Kudayev as one of 54 former Guantánamo detainees confirmed or suspected of engaging in militant activities against either U.S. or non-U.S. targets. He was classified under Category 4: Former GTMO Detainees Suspected of Engaging in Militant Activities Against Non-U.S. Targets.

== See also ==
- Minors detained in the War on Terror
