= Muhammad Ismail Agha =

Afghan national

- Born: Nawzad, Afghanistan
- Arrested: December 2002; Girishk; Afghan soldiers
- Released: January 29, 2004; Bagram
- Detained at: Girishk; Bagram; Guantanamo Bay detention camp
- ISN: 930
- Status: Released, then recaptured
- Parents: Hayatullah (father)

Muhammad Ismail Agha (born 1988 or 1989) is an Afghan national who was among some 15-21 juveniles held at the Guantanamo Bay detention camps. He is believed to be 13 or 14 years old when arrested by Afghan soldiers. Detained without charge, he was released on January 29, 2004, and returned home.

He was recaptured in May 2004 during an engagement with US forces near Kandahar.

== Early life ==
Agha was born in Durabin (also written as Doorbini), a poor farming village near Nawzad, Afghanistan. There is some confusion about his date of birth: U.S. Department of Defense records indicate he was born in 1988, while first-hand reports suggest it was 1989.^{[a]}

He helped his father, Hayatullah, as a builder, before leaving his village to look for construction work in December 2002.

== Detention in 2002 ==
Shortly after leaving home to look for work in December 2002, Agha was detained by Afghan soldiers in Girishk for attempting to join the Taliban to fight against Americans, a charge he denied. At the time, he would have been aged between 13 and 14 years old.^{[b]} He was then transferred to the United States at Bagram Air Base in Afghanistan. During this time, he says he was held in solitary confinement and subjected to sleep deprivation and stress position, both enhanced interrogation techniques used at the time by the U.S. Armed Forces.

He was then transferred on February 7, 2003, to Guantanamo Bay, Cuba.^{[c]} He was put with two other teenagers, Naqibullah and Asadullah, in Camp Iguana, the section of Guantanamo built for juveniles. Unlike other detainees, those in Camp Iguana were not shackled and hooded, and did not wear orange boiler suits.

They were given classes in Pashto (their native language), English, Arabic, Islam, mathematics, science, and art. While there, they learned to read and write. Their camp had a recreation yard, where the boys played football every day with their guards, and sometimes basketball and volleyball. Agha and his family said that he was treated well by the American troops and attended school during his incarceration at Guantanamo, although he criticized the US for not contacting his parents for 10 months, and failing to let them know that he was still alive during that time.

He was transported to Bagram along with the other two juvenile detainees and released on January 29, 2004; a Red Cross plane took him from there to Kandahar.

== Subsequent recapture ==
Agha was recaptured in May 2004, while participating in an attack on US forces near Kandahar, and was carrying documentation linking him to the Taliban. In June 2005, Representative Duncan Hunter, chairman of the House Armed Services Committee, said that the Guantanamo release policy was too liberal, pointing to the capture of Agha four months after his release. This was repeated by Senator Lindsey Graham in the U.S. Senate a year later, adding that the attack occurred near Kandahar. The US military released a list confirming his recapture in May 2007.

== Notes ==
a. Agha was interviewed by reporters on 11 February 2004. They variously reported him as being aged 13 when detained, which occurred early in December 2002. That indicates he was born before December 1989.
b. The U.S. DoD record his birthyear as 1988. As noted in (a) above, he has been reported as being 13 when captured on capture in December 2002. Together, that gives an age range of 13-14 years old.
c. The U.S. DoD Transfer Recommendation misstates the year as 2002. Agha was transferred in February 2003.
