= Abd al Razaq Abdallah Hamid Ibrahim al Sharikh =

Saudi former Guantanamo Bay detainee (born 1984)

Abd al Razaq Abdullah Hamed Ibrahim al Sharikh
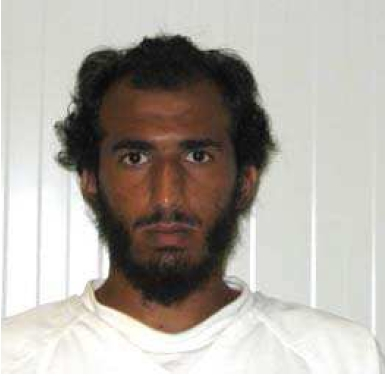
- Guantanamo mugshot
- Born: January 18, 1984 (age 42)
- Detained at: Guantanamo
- Other name: Abd al Razzaq Abdallah Ibrahim al Tamini
- ISN: 67
- Charge: No charge (held in extrajudicial detention)
- Status: Transferred to Saudi Arabia

Abd al Razaq Abdallah Hamid Ibrahim al Sharikh is a citizen of Saudi Arabia who was held in extrajudicial detention in the United States Guantanamo Bay detainment camps, in Cuba.

He was captured along with his brother in December 2001, and both of them were sent to Guantanamo.

The Department of Defense reports that he was born on January 18, 1984, in Shaqqara, Saudi Arabia.

Al Sharikh arrived in Guantanamo on January 18, 2002, and was transferred to the Saudi jihadist rehabilitation program on September 5, 2007.

== Combatant Status Review ==
Al Sharikh was among the 60% of prisoners who participated in the tribunal hearings. A Summary of Evidence memo was prepared for the tribunal of each detainee. The memo for his hearing lists the following:

a The detainee is a member of Al Qaida.
1. In about late 2000, the detainee traveled from his native Saudi Arabia to Afghanistan via Pakistan.
2. The detainee was motivated to travel to Afghanistan to become a martyr like his brother, who died in combat in Chechnya.
3. Upon arriving at a safe house in Kandahar, Afghanistan, the detainee informed the safe-house facilitator that he wanted to go to the "front lines."
4. The detainee received two months of training at the Al Farouq training camp.
5. While at Al Farouq, the detainee received training on small arms including the Makarov, AK-47, Dragunov SVD, RPG-7, and the RGD-5 hand grenades.
6. During his training at Al Farouq, the detainee attended a speech given by Usama Bin Laden.
7. While at the Al Farouq training camp, the detainee observed that the number of recruits training at the camp grew substantially during the summer months of 2001.

b The detainee participated in military operations against the coalition.
1. The detainee admits that he served on the "front lines" where fighting occurred.
2. The detainee used the Makarov, Dragunov SVD, and AK-47 weapons while serving on the front lines.
3. The detainee was captured by Pakistani police while traveling with a group of Arabs and Afghanis, some of whom were security guards for Usama Bin Laden.

== First annual Administrative Review Board hearing ==
Detainees who were determined to have been properly classified as "enemy combatants" were scheduled to have their dossier reviewed at annual Administrative Review Board hearings. The Administrative Review Boards weren't authorized to review whether a detainee qualified for POW status, and they weren't authorized to review whether a detainee should have been classified as an "enemy combatant".

They were authorized to consider whether a detainee should continue to be detained by the United States, because they continued to pose a threat—or whether they could safely be repatriated to the custody of their home country, or whether they could be set free.

There is no record of Al Tamini participating in his First Annual Administrative Review Board hearing.

== Second annual Administrative Review Board hearing ==
Detainees whose Combatant Status Review Tribunal confirmed their original classification as enemy combatants will have their detention at Guantanamo reviewed on an annual basis. The BBC offered an account of the Second Administrative Review Board hearing of a young Saudi named Abdul-Razzaq. Guantanamo contained about half a dozen detainees named Abdul-Razzaq, or something similar. but Al Tamini is the only one who is a Saudi. The detainee the BBC identified as Abdul-Razzaq said:

"I was 17-years-old and full of enthusiasm for jihad, but now after five years in Guantanamo I have changed. I need to go back to my country, lead a simple life, care for my old parents, and have a wife and kids."

The BBC reports that the detainee told his Board that two of his brothers had died during jihad, one in Chechnya, and one in Afghanistan, while a third brother was captured at the same time he was.

According to the BBC his Board promised to investigate when he reported:

"...that some of the evidence presented to the board - especially evidence kept from detainees - is false or was taken under pressure or psychological torture."

== Repatriated ==
Al Sharikh was transferred to Saudi Arabia on September 5, 2007.

== Abdulmohsin Al-Sharikh's most wanted status ==
On February 3, 2009, the Saudi Government published its fourth list of most wanted suspected terrorists. Abdulhadi and Abdulrazzaq's brother Abdulmohsin Al-Sharikh were some of the individuals listed on the new list.

== See also ==
- Minors detained in the global war on terror
