= List of Uzbekistani detainees at Guantanamo Bay =

On May 15, 2006, the United States Department of Defense acknowledged that there have been 7 Uzbek detainees held in Guantanamo. The Guantanamo Bay detainment camps were opened on January 11, 2002, at the Guantanamo Bay Naval Base, in Cuba. The Bush administration asserted that all detainees taken in the "global war on terror" could be held there, in extrajudicial detention, without revealing their names. So far as the detainee's families and friends would know, they would just disappear.

However, the Associated Press had filed a Freedom of Information Act request for the names of all the detainee. The Department of Defense filed justifications for why they should not be obliged to release the information the Associated Press requested. They justified keeping the information secret not to protect the United States "national security", but merely because they were concerned to protect the detainee's privacy.

The Department of Defense exhausted their legal appeals and were forced, by a court order, to release the identities of all the Guantanamo detainees.

== List of Uzbeks whom the DoD has acknowledged they have held in Guantanamo ==
isn	name	arrival date	departure date	notes
22	Shakhrukh Hamiduva	2002-01-14	2009-09-27	Child refugee.; Claims abuse in custody.
84	Ilkham Turdbyavich Batayev	2002-02-07	2006-12-15	Was captured by the Northern Alliance, imprisoned in al Janki prison in Mazari Sharif, and was present during, and injured by, the al Janki prison riot.; Official list says he was a citizen of Uzbekistan.; Some reports say he was from Kazakhstan.; Transferred from Guantanamo on December 15, 2006.
452	Oybek Jamoldinivich Jabbarov	2002-06-16	2009-09-27	Transferred to Ireland with another Uzbek on September 26, 2009.
454	Mohammed Sadiq Adam	2002-02-07	2004-03-14	Transferred from Guantanamo on March 14, 2004.
455	Ali Sher Hamidullah	2002-06-18		Acknowledged fleeing Uzbekistan and settling in Afghanistan, with his family.; Cleared for release on December 23, 2005.
672	Zakirjan Asam	2002-06-08	2006-11-17	Allegedly a member of the Islamic Movement of Uzbekistan.; Determined not to have been an enemy combatant during his Combatant Status Review Tribunal.; Was held in Guantanamo for a further two years after the determination he had never been an enemy combatant was made.; Was involuntarily transferred to a refugee camp in Albania.; The Center for Constitutional Rights is aiding Asam and four other men sue former Secretary of Defense Donald Rumsfeld, former Chairman of the Joint Chiefs of Staff Richard Myers and some Guantanamo officers.; Some reports say he is a Russian.
675	Kamalludin Kasimbekov	2002-06-14	2010-07-22	Allegedly trained at an Afghan military camp.; Inadequate transcript – only two of at least half a dozen allegations were recorded in the transcript.

On September 26, 2009, the Department of Justice announced that three men were transferred from Guantanamo. One of the men was Yemeni detainee Alla Ali Bin Ali Ahmed, who was repatriated to Yemen. The two other men were transferred to Ireland. Their names were withheld. Reuters reported that Ireland had previously inquired into taking two Uzbek detainees.

On September 27, 2009, the Associated Press reported that one of the two men was "31-year-old Oybek Jabbarov". Dermot Ahern, the Minister of Justice, asked reporters to respect the men's privacy.

Switzerland accepted one former Uzbekistani detainee on January 26, 2010. His name was withheld.

== See also ==
- Furkat Kasimovich Yusupov
