= Elisabeth Bumiller =

American journalist and writer

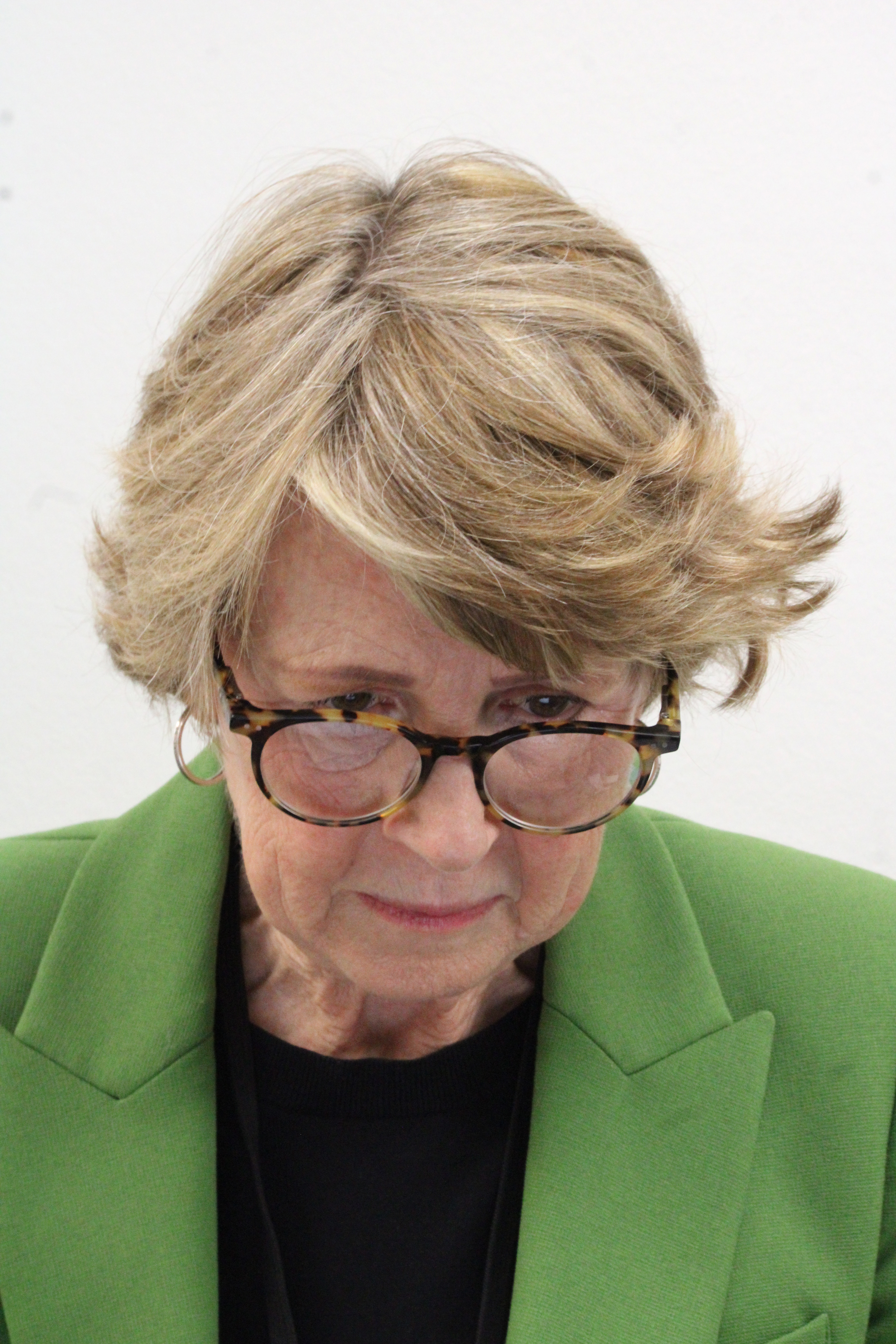
- Bumiller in 2026
- Born: May 15, 1956 (age 70); Aalborg, Denmark
- Education: Northwestern University; Columbia University
- Occupation: Washington bureau chief for The New York Times
- Spouse: Steven R. Weisman (m. 1983)
- Children: 2

Elisabeth Bumiller (born May 15, 1956) is an American author and journalist who served as the Washington bureau chief for The New York Times from September 2015 until November 2024.

== Early life and education ==
Bumiller was born in Aalborg, Denmark to a Danish mother, Gunhild Bumiller Rose, and an American father, Theodore R. Bumiller. Her mother was a nurse and her father an adventure-film photographer and producer. The family moved to Cincinnati, Ohio, when she was three years old. Bumiller attended Walnut Hills High School, where she reported for the school newspaper, the Walnut Hills Chatterbox. She graduated in 1974.

Bumiller then attended Northwestern University as an undergraduate in the Medill School of Journalism, graduating in 1977. She wrote for the Daily Northwestern. She received a master's degree from the Columbia University Graduate School of Journalism in 1979.

== Career ==
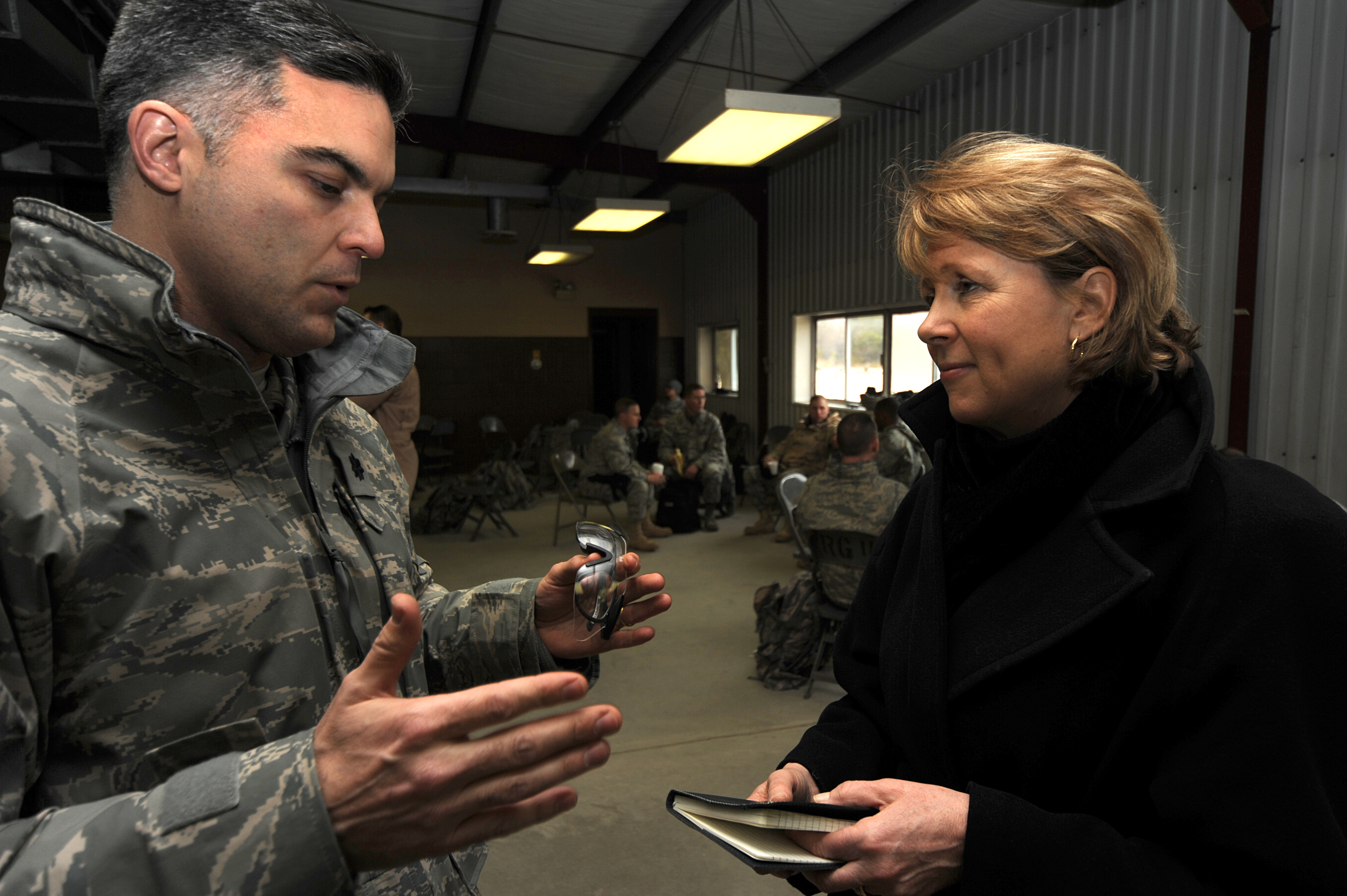
Bumiller in interview on U.S. Air Force deployment in 2009

Bumiller began her career at the Miami Herald. Her first journalism job in Washington was party reporter for The Washington Post's "Style" section, where she covered Washington society. In this role, Bumiller followed First Lady Nancy Reagan to the wedding of Charles, Prince of Wales, and Lady Diana Spencer.

In 1985, Bumiller moved to India and continued to write for the Style section of the Post. She also wrote her first book, May You Be the Mother of a Hundred Sons (Ballantine, 1991), described as "examination of daily life for women in India." In 1989, when her husband Steven R. Weisman became Tokyo bureau chief for the Times, the couple moved again to Japan, where Bumiller continued to work for the Post and also began work on a second book, The Secrets of Mariko (Vintage, 1996).

In 1992, Bumiller and Weisman moved to New York, where Weisman took up the post of deputy foreign editor for the Times. In 1995, Bumiller joined her husband at the Times, as a general assignment metro reporter.

From fall 1999 until 2001, Bumiller became New York City Hall bureau chief, where she covered the mayoral administration of Rudolph Giuliani and Giuliani's abortive 2000 bid for the U.S. Senate against Hillary Clinton. During this time, Bumiller was a contributor to the "Public Lives" column, which profiled city officials.

In 2001, Bumiller was promoted to White House correspondent for the Times, serving in that role from September 10, 2001, to 2006. Weisman followed her to become the senior diplomatic correspondent for the Times.

Bumiller was criticized by Eric Boehlert and Glenn Greenwald for failing to question George W. Bush on the run-up to the Iraq War. Reflecting on a March 6, 2003, presidential press conference before the invasion of Iraq, Bumiller said: "I think we were very deferential because ... it's live, it's very intense, it's frightening to stand up there. Think about it, you're standing up on prime-time live TV asking the president of the United States a question when the country's about to go to war. There was a very serious, somber tone that evening, and no one wanted to get into an argument with the president at this very serious time." At a panel discussion sponsored by Northwestern's Medill School of Journalism in November 2004, Bumiller stated: "You can't just say the president is lying...You can in an editorial, but I'm sorry, you can't in a news column...You can say Mr. Bush's statement was not factually accurate. You can't say the president is lying—that's a judgment call."

Beginning in June 2006, Bumiller took a one-year leave of absence from the Times to write a biography of U.S. Secretary of State Condoleezza Rice. During this period, Bumiller was also a Public Policy Scholar at the Woodrow Wilson International Center for Scholars (September 2006—February 2007) and a Transatlantic Fellow at the German Marshall Fund. Bumiller's book, Condoleezza Rice: An American Life, was published by Random House in December 2007. The book, which was based on ten interviews with Rice as well as interviews from 150 others, portrays Rice catering to Bush's desire to invade Iraq, and it describes her being taken completely by surprise when Hamas won the 2006 Palestinian elections. Jacob Heilbrunn, reviewing the book in The New York Times, wrote that Bumiller "brings a keen eye to Rice, probing not only her tenure as a policy maker and her close ties to George W. Bush, but also her personal and professional past.

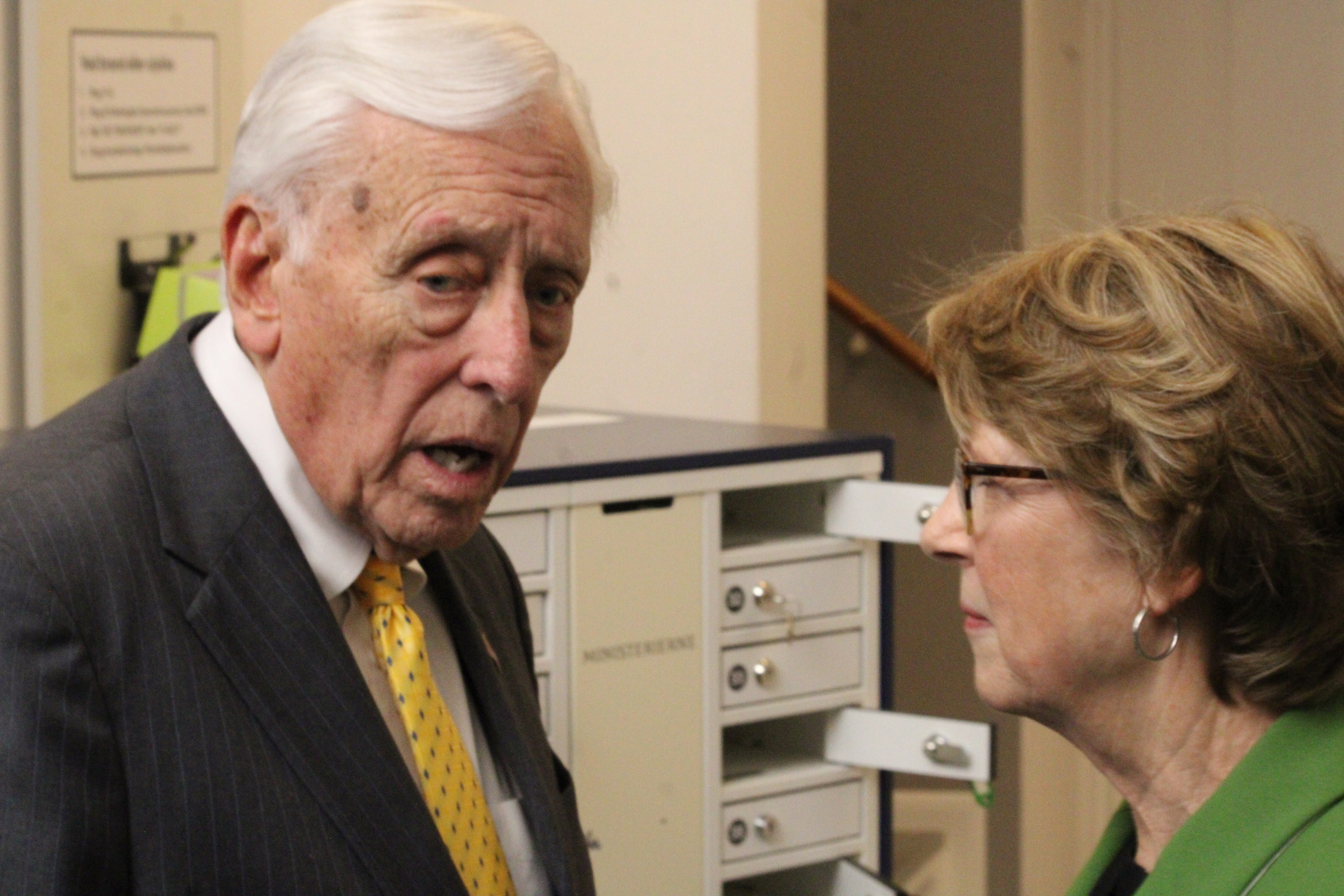
Bumiller speaking to Steny Hoyer at Christiansborg in Copenhagen, Denmark, January 2026

In 2008, Bumiller covered the presidential campaign of Senator John McCain for the Times. During the campaign, McCain at times clashed with Bumiller and other Times writers. From 2008 to early 2013, Bumiller served as Pentagon correspondent; in this role, she traveled with the Secretary of Defense and was embedded with U.S. forces in Afghanistan. In May 2009, the Times published a controversial front-page article by Bumiller citing an unreleased Pentagon report for the proposition that one in seven detainees released from the Guantanamo Bay detention camp "returned to terrorism or militant activity"; this figure was criticized as inflated in a Times op-ed by Peter Bergen and Katherine Tiedemann, and Times public editor Clark Hoyt wrote that editors should have taken a more skeptical approach.

Subsequently, Bumiller was named Washington editor. In September 2015, executive editor Dean Baquet of The New York Times announced that Bumiller would replace Carolyn Ryan as the Washington bureau chief.

== Personal life ==
In fall 1979, Bumiller met Steven R. Weisman, then the White House correspondent for The New York Times, and the two married in 1983 in an interfaith ceremony at their home in Georgetown. They have two children: a girl born in Japan and their second child, a boy was born after the couple moved to New York in the early 1990s.
