= Ravil Mingazov =

Russian former Guantanamo Bay detainee

Ravil Kamilevich Mingazov
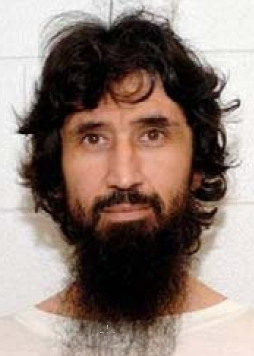
- Ravil Mingazov`s official Guantanamo identity portrait
- Born: December 5, 1967 (age 58); Ust-Bolsheretskiy District, Kamchatka Krai, Russian SFSR, Soviet Union
- Arrested: Faisalabad, Punjab, Pakistan; Pakistani officials
- Citizenship: Russian
- Detained at: Guantanamo
- ISN: 702
- Charge: No charge extrajudicial detention
- Status: cleared for release through his habeas corpus petition; referred for prosecution by the Guantanamo Review Task Force; approved for transfer by the Periodic Review Board; transferred to the UAE on 2017-01-19; repatriated to Russia on 2024-08-07

Ravil Kamilevich Mingazov (Russian: Равиль Камилевич Мингазов; born December 5, 1967) is a citizen of Russia who was held in extrajudicial detention for almost fifteen years in the United States's Guantanamo Bay detention camps, in Cuba. The Department of Defense reports that Mingazov was born on December 5, 1967, in Ust-Bolsheretskiy, Russia.

Ravil Mingazov arrived at Guantanamo on October 28, 2002, and was held at Guantanamo for 14 years, 2 months and 22 days.

Mingazov, an ethnic Tatar, was a ballet dancer, before he joined the Soviet army. Anti-Muslim harassment drove Mingazov to leave Russia for Tajikistan, in 2000.

Mingazov was approved for transfer on July 21, 2016. He was transferred to the United Arab Emirates on January 19, 2017.

== Official status reviews ==
=== Office for the Administrative Review of Detained Enemy Combatants ===
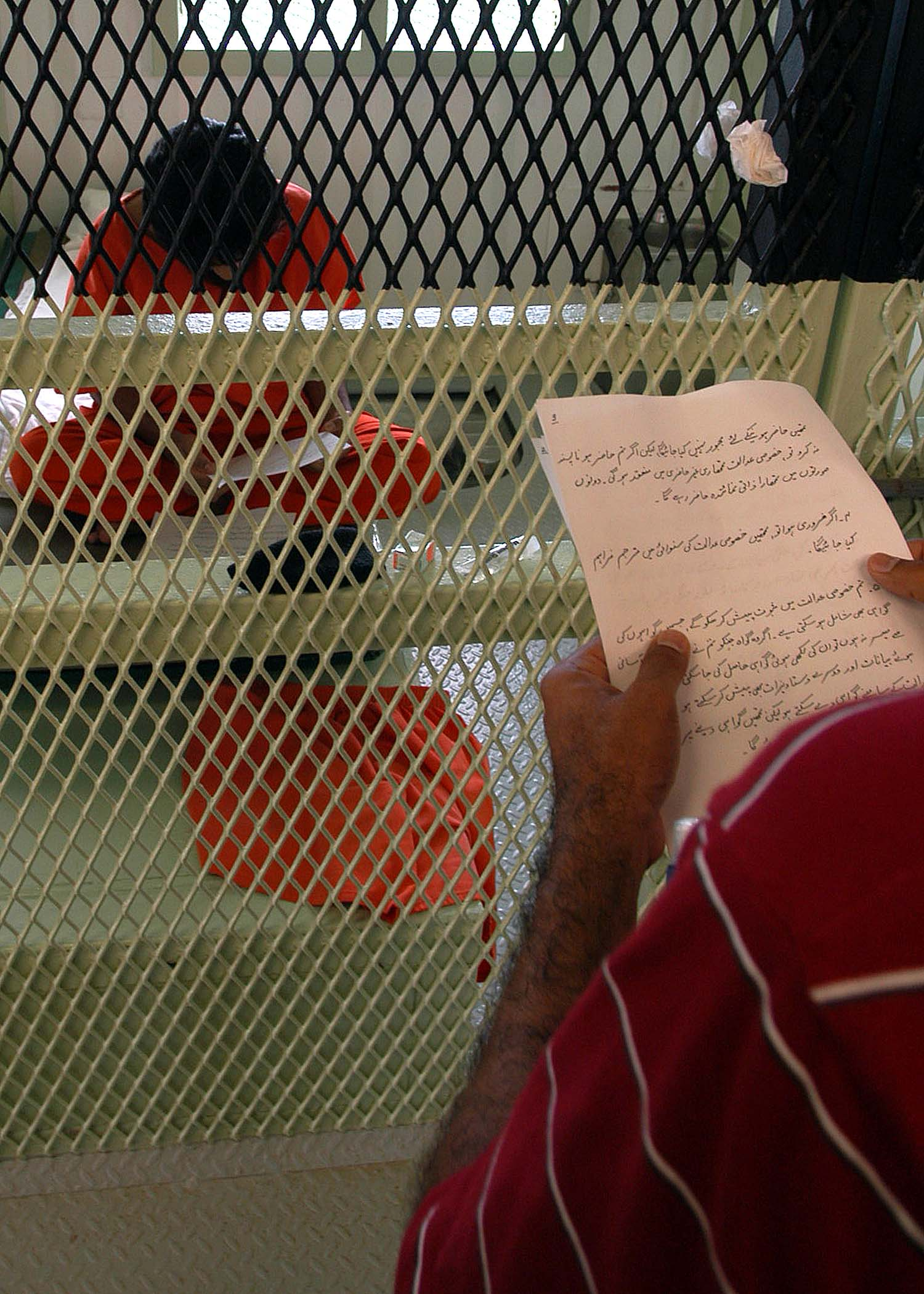
Following the Supreme Court's ruling in Rasul v. Bush the DoD was required to read a notice to every captive informing them that they would have an opportunity to learn why they were being held, and to offer a response, at their Combatant Status Review Tribunal.

Scholars at the Brookings Institution, led by Benjamin Wittes, listed the captives still held in Guantanamo in December 2008, according to whether their detention was justified by certain common allegations:

- Ravil Mingazov was listed as one of the captives who "The military alleges ... are associated with Al Qaeda."
- Ravil Mingazov was listed as one of the captives who "The military alleges ... stayed in Al Qaeda, Taliban or other guest- or safehouses."
- Ravil Mingazov was listed as one of the captives who "The military alleges ... took military or terrorist training in Afghanistan."
- Ravil Mingazov was listed as one of the captives who "The military alleges that the following detainees were captured under circumstances that strongly suggest belligerency."
- Ravil Mingazov was listed as one of the captives who was an "al Qaeda operative".
- Ravil Mingazov was listed as one of the "34 [captives] admit to some lesser measure of affiliation—like staying in Taliban or Al Qaeda guesthouses or spending time at one of their training camps."
- Ravil Mingazov was listed as one of the captives who had "stayed at Taliban or Al Qaeda guesthouses."
- Ravil Mingazov was listed as one of the captives who had admitted "some form of associational conduct."

=== Writ of habeas corpus ===
On May 13, 2010, US District Court Judge Henry H. Kennedy, Jr., the Obama administration to release Mingazov under the writ of habeas corpus. Mingazov's was the 35 case where the judge ordered a release. The government had succeeded in convincing a habeas corpus judge continued detention was justified in an additional 13 cases.

A panel of judges on the Washington DC court of appeals reversed Kennedy's release order.

=== Formerly secret JTF-GTMO assessment ===
On April 25, 2011, the whistleblower organization WikiLeaks published formerly secret assessments prepared by Joint Task Force Guantanamo. Ravil’s assessment was nine pages and recommended continued detention under DoD Control. It was signed by camp commandant Mark H. Buzby.

=== Guantanamo Joint Task Force Review ===
On January 20, 2009, newly inaugurated President Barack Obama issued several Presidential Executive Orders related to the Guantanamo detention center – which he had promised to close during his presidential campaign. Those Executive Orders set up a Guantanamo Review Task Force, intended to replace OARDEC. In October 2013, Freedom of Information Act requests submitted by Carol Rosenberg and her colleagues at the Miami Herald triggered the publication of a list of "final dispositions". According to that list Ravil Mingazov should be "referred for prosecution".

== Repatriation discussions ==
Russian officials are scheduled to travel to Guantanamo on January 17, 2014, to meet with Mingazov. According to the Moscow Times, visiting Russian officials had been turned away in April 2013, because Mingazov had declined to meet with them.

== Asylum in the United Kingdom ==
On November 6, 2015, The Guardian reported that Mingazov's teenage son and his former wife now live in the United Kingdom, and that his family had filed an asylum application on his behalf. His son and former wife arrived in the UK in 2014, and live with other relatives of Mingazov there.

== Transfer to the United Arab Emirates ==
Mingazov was one of the last four individuals to be transferred from Guantanamo before the end of Barack Obama's Presidency. Mingazov, an Afghan, Wali Mohammed, and a Yemeni, Yassim Qasim Mohammed Ismail Qasim, were transferred to the United Arab Emirates, while Jabran al-Qahtani was repatriated to Saudi Arabia, on January 19, 2017, just one day prior to Donald Trump's inauguration. Trump had promised to curtail all transfers from Guantanamo.

== Repatriation ==
Mingazov was repatriated to Russia on August 7, 2024.
