= Fethi Boucetta =

Algerian Guantanamo detainee

- Born: September 15, 1963; Algiers, Algeria
- Detained at: Guantanamo
- Charge: No charge (held in extrajudicial detention)
- Status: Transferred to Albanian custody, in an Albanian refugee camp.

Fethi Boucetta (aka Abu Mohammed) is a citizen of Algeria, who was held in extrajudicial detention in the United States Guantanamo Bay detention camps, in Cuba. His Guantanamo Internment Serial Number was 718. The Department of Defense reports that he was born on September 15, 1963, in Algiers.

== Combatant Status Review ==
A Summary of Evidence memo was prepared for his tribunal. The memo listed the following allegations against him:

a. The detainee supported the Taliban and al Qaida forces.

1. The detainee is an Algerian national who has traveled between Pakistan and Afghanistan between 1989 through 2002.
2. the detainee reportedly was an active member of the Islamic Salvation Front.
3. The Islamic Salvation Front is a terrorist and armed militant group.
4. The detainee reportedly left Yemen and went to Afghanistan at the request of the Taliban.
5. In Afghanistan, the detainee reportedly organized combatants to fight for the Taliban.
6. The detainee reportedly has organized extremist networks in Arab countries and has contacts throughout the Middle East.
7. The detainee was arrested in Pakistan during a raid of al Qaida residences, on May 27, 2002.

== Determined not to have been an Enemy Combatant ==
The Washington Postreports that Boucetta was one of 38 detainees who was determined not to have been an enemy combatant during his Combatant Status Review Tribunal. They report that Boucetta has been released.

The Ottawa Citizen speculates that Boucetta may be one of a select number of detainees under consideration for an offer of Asylum.

== Habeas corpus ==
At least one habeas corpus petition was submitted on his behalf. On April 17, 2007, the United States Department of Justice submitted a motion to dismiss his habeas corpus petition, and approximately 100 other habeas corpus petitions, because he was no longer in US custody. The motion says his case was amalgamated into Mohammon v. Bush. The motion identifies him as: "Abu Mohammed", "Dr. Abu Mohammed", and "Boucetta Fihi". His case was heard before US District Court Judge Reggie Walton.

The United States Department of Defense published 179 habeas petitions, but they didn't publish his.

== Release ==
Three of the remaining Guantanamo captives who were determined not to have been enemy combatants were released to Albania in November 2006. The men were not identified, other than by nationality. One of the released men was an Algerian. They were reported to have been the last of the men classified as "no longer enemy combatants to have remained in custody.

== UN refugee status ==
An article in the Kansas City Star describes how the United Nations High Commission for Refugees only learned in December 2006 that the Americans had been holding internationally protected refugees in Guantanamo. The article says the UNHCR wrote the Pentagon, on December 20, 2006, seeking information on why Mammar Ameur and Mohammed Sulaymon Barre were being detained in Guantanamo. The article stated that Fethi Boucetta, was also an internationally protected refugee, and that the Americans had transferred him to Albania. The article added that Boucetta was a medical doctor.

The BBC later interviewed him in Albania, where he was using the name "Abu Mohammed" He told the BBC:

Those Americans brought me here by force. I refused to come here.

== McClatchy interview ==
On June 15, 2008, the McClatchy News Service published articles based on interviews with 66 former Guantanamo captives. McClatchy reporters interviewed Abu Mohammed. He reports he remains mystified as to why he was originally captured, and why he continued to be detained.

He reports he was held for two months in the Bagram Theater Detention Facility, was told he was being sent home, but, instead, was sent to Guantanamo.
