= Ruslan Odizhev =

Russian Guantanamo Bay detainee (1973–2007)

Ruslan Anatolyevich Odizhev
- Born: December 5, 1973; Prokhladny, Kabardino-Balkaria, Russia
- Died: June 27, 2007 (aged 33); Nalchik, Kabardino-Balkaria, Russia
- Citizenship: Russia
- Detained at: Guantanamo
- ISN: 211
- Charge: No charge (held in extrajudicial detention)
- Status: repatriated, charged with new crimes, in Russia, killed by the police while "resisting arrest".

Ruslan Anatolyevich Odizhev (Russian: Руслан Анатольевич Одижев; December 5, 1973 – June 27, 2007), born as Ruslan Anatolyevich Seleznyov (Селезнёв), was a citizen of Russia who was held in extrajudicial detention in the United States Guantanamo Bay detention camps, in Cuba. His Guantanamo Internment Serial Number was 211 and he was listed as "Ruslan Anatolivich Odijev, born at Prolandnom, Russia".

== Life ==
Sleznyov was born in Prokhladny, Kabardino-Balkar Republic of North Caucasus. When he was six, his parents divorced and he went to live with his mother in the neighbouring town of Nalchik. At school, he was very interested in religion and Islamic history. At the age of 18, he joined the then recently opened Islamic Institute. Afraid they would not accept him with the Russian name Seleznyov he dropped it for the more Islamic name Odizhev. He studied there one year before joining the Confederation of Caucasus Peoples' Kabardin Battalion who fought in the Abkhaz rebellion against Georgia in 1992. When the barge that his platoon was on, sank, he had to stay in ice-cold water for hours and damaged his lungs. One year later, he returned to the Islamic Institute, but soon left it to study at Imam Muhammad ibn Saud Islamic University in Riyadh, Saudi Arabia. He came back in 1994.

From 1999, Odizhev was targeted by the FSB who suspected him of participation in terrorist activities, particularly the Russian apartment bombings. In May 2000, he was taken away from home by masked men to be interrogated, and according to claims by him and his mother, tortured by the FSB in Pyatigorsk. He was released ten days later. The FSB denied all involvement.

Odizhev left Nalchik, telling his mother that he was going to Pakistan to complete his religious studies. He was however taken as a prisoner of war by American forces, and sent to Guantanamo prison.

On February 27, 2004, Odizhev, together with six other persons of Russian nationality (including Rasul Kudayev, who also lived in Nalchik) was extradited to Russia. All seven ex-prisoners were sent to the White Swan isolation camp at Pyatigorsk on charges of illegally crossing Russian borders and being a mercenary. In June 2004, it was decided that the charges could not be proven and all seven accused were freed.

Back in Nalchik, according to Russian OMON, Odizhev soon became re-acquainted with Anzor Astemirov, an Islamic cleric who claimed being connected to Shamil Basayev and a friend of Odizhev from 2000.

On June 14, 2006, Odizhev was included among a list of those who had taken part in the 2005 Nalchik raid, published on the internet by the MVD of the Kabardino-Balkar Republic. According to the police, Odizhev had headed the group of fighters who attacked OMON headquarters.

On June 27, 2007, Odizhev was killed in the centre of Nalchik, in an apartment block on Schokenzukov Prospekt, facing the local (official) mosque, while resisting arrest, together with Anzor Tengizov. Police authorities reiterated that charges against Odizhev included involvement in the 1999 bombings. Geydar Dzhemal', of the Islamic Committee of Russia, claimed that Odizhev's guilt had not been established and that he could have been captured alive.

== Claims he "returned to terrorism" ==
The Defense Intelligence Agency asserted Odizhev had "returned to terrorism". The DIA reported:

Ruslan Anatolivich Odishev, transferred to Russia in March 2004, was killed in a June 2007 gun battle with Russia’s Federal Security Service. Russian authorities stated that Odijev had taken part in several terrorist acts including an October 2005 attack in the Caucasus region that killed and injured several police officers. Odijev was found with pistols, a grenade, and homemade explosive devices on his body.

== Sources ==
- Biography of Ruslan Odizhev
