= Timur Ravilich Ishmurat =

Russian former Guantanamo Bay detainee

Timur Ishmuratov is a Russian citizen who was held in extrajudicial detention in the United States Guantanamo Bay detainment camps, in Cuba.

Ishmuratov was one of eight Russians held by the United States in extrajudicial detention in the Guantanamo Bay detainment camps, in Cuba. He was repatriated to Russian custody, cleared, released, and subsequently rearrested for suspicion of an act of sabotage in Russia.

== Repatriation ==
Ishmuratov and six of the Russian captives were repatriated in February 2004.

Ishmuratov, Ravil Gumarov and Fanis Shaikhutdinov were arrested in 2005 for a role in a January 8, 2005, bombing of a natural gas pipeline. The three men were acquitted in October 2005. The three men described being tortured by Russian police, who were trying to secure confessions. The Prosecution filed an appeal, and the three men were convicted in 2006, following their retrial. Human rights workers claimed the trials were "riddled with irregularities".

In 2007, a human rights report that criticized the Bush administration for repatriating Guantanamo captives to Russia on the grounds US law proscribed returning individuals to countries where they were likely to face torture.

== Defense Intelligence Agency claims he "returned to terrorism" ==
The Defense Intelligence Agency asserted Timur Ravilich Ishmurat had "returned to terrorism". The DIA reported:

Ravil Shafeyavich Gumarov and Timur Ravilich Ishmurat were transferred to Russia in March 2004 and quickly released. Russian authorities arrested them in January 2005 for involvement in a gas line bombing. In May 2006 a Russian court convicted both, sentencing Gumarov to 13 years in prison and Ishmurat to 11 years.

== Medical records ==
On March 16, 2007, the Department of Defense published records of the captives' height and weights.
