= Ravil Shafeyavich Gumarov =

Russian former Guantanamo Bay detainee (born 1962)

- Born: November 22, 1962 (age 63); Bashkortostan, Russia
- Citizenship: Russia
- Detained at: Guantanamo
- Other name: Ravil Gumarov
- ISN: 203
- Charge: No charge (held in extrajudicial detention)
- Status: Repatriated

Ravil Gumarov is a Russian citizen who is alleged to have ties to terrorism.

Gumarov was one of eight Russians held by the United States in extrajudicial detention in the Guantanamo Bay detention camps, in Cuba. His Guantanamo Internment Serial Number was 203. The Department of Defense reports Gumaraov was born on November 22, 1962, in Gushva, Russia

He was repatriated to Russian custody, cleared, then released.

He was subsequently rearrested for suspicion of an act of sabotage. Gumarov, fellow Guantanamo detainee Timur Ishmuratov and Fanis Shaikhutdinov were convicted of bombing a natural gas pipeline on May 9, 2006. Gumarov has been described as a failed businessman from Sverdlovsk who is alleged to have had military training in Chechnya.

== Defense Intelligence Agency claims he "returned to terrorism" ==
The Defense Intelligence Agency asserted Ravil Shafeyavich Gumarov had "returned to terrorism". The DIA reported:

Ravil Shafeyavich Gumarov and Timur Ravilich Ishmurat were transferred to Russia in March 2004 and quickly released. Russian authorities arrested them in January 2005 for involvement in a gas line bombing. In May 2006 a Russian court convicted both, sentencing Gumarov to 13 years in prison and Ishmurat to 11 years.
