= Guantanamo detainees' appeals in Washington, D.C., courts =

Guantanamo Bay detainees have been allowed to initiate appeals in Washington, D.C., courts since the passage of the Detainee Treatment Act of 2005 (DTA) closed off the right of Guantanamo captives to submit new petitions of habeas corpus. It substituted a right to a limited appeal to Federal Courts of appeal in Washington, D.C. The Act allowed detainees to challenge whether their Combatant Status Review Tribunals had correctly followed the rules laid out by the Department of Defense.

After the passage of the Military Commissions Act of 2006 (MCA) closed down the pending habeas corpus cases, attorneys for the detainees initiated both a challenge to the constitutionality of the MCA's stripping of the right to habeas corpus; and they started initiating the appeals in the DC Federal Courts of appeal allowed by the DTA.

== June 2008 rulings ==
On June 12, 2008, in Boumediene v. Bush, the United States Supreme Court ruled the Combatant Status Review Tribunals provided the detainees with insufficient protection, and re-opened the detainees' access to file habeas corpus.

On June 23, 2008, a three judge panel reviewed the evidence used to justify Parhat's designation as an "enemy combatant" and ruled that he had never been an enemy combatant after all.

== Bush Presidency response ==
On July 21, 2008, United States Attorney General Michael Mukasey called on the Congress to pass legislation controlling how judges would review the detainees' habeas petitions. Mukasey was seeking to have the legislation control what evidence should be made public, and to proscribe releasing any of the detainees within the USA.

== January 2009 ruling ==
On January 9, 2009, Douglas H. Ginsburg, writing for the panel, ruled that the court would not hear any additional DTA appeals.

Had the Congress known its attempts to eliminate the habeas jurisdiction of the district courts would come to naught, it would not have turned around and created an additional and largely duplicative process by which a detainee could challenge his detention in the court of appeals.

== Detainees who filed appeals in federal court ==
ISN	Name	Case	Notes
103	Arkin Mahmud		By August 18, 2008, an unclassified return prepared in response to a 2007 DTA appeal.
252	Yasin Mohammed Basardah [sic]		On November 5, 2008, the panel suspended his appeal on jurisdictional grounds.
275	Abdul Sabour [sic]		By August 18, 2008, an unclassified return prepared in response to a 2007 DTA appeal.
277	Bahtiyar Mahnut		By August 18, 2008, an unclassified return prepared in response to a 2007 DTA appeal.
278	Abdul Nasser [sic]		By August 18, 2008, both unclassified and classified returns prepared in response to a 2007 DTA appeal.
280	Khalid Ali		By August 18, 2008, both unclassified and classified returns prepared in response to a 2007 DTA appeal.
281	Abdul Ghappar Abdul Rahman		By August 18, 2008, both unclassified and classified returns prepared in response to a 2007 DTA appeal.
282	Sabir Osman [sic]		By August 18, 2008, both unclassified and classified returns prepared in response to a 2007 DTA appeal.
285	Jalal Jalaldin [sic]		By August 18, 2008, both unclassified and classified returns prepared in response to a 2007 DTA appeal.
288	Motai Saib [sic]		On May 16, 2007, Saib filed a Petition for Release and Other Relief Under Detainee Treatment Act of 2005 ("DTA Petition"). In light of the U.S. Supreme Court's decision in Boumediene, Respondents filed a motion to hold the DTA Petition in abeyance, or in the alternative, to dismiss the DTA Petition, pending the conclusion of his Habeas Petition. Saib has filed a response stating that he does not oppose the abeyance of the DTA Petition, but does oppose dismissal of the DTA Petition.
295	Abdul Semet [sic]		By August 18, 2008, both unclassified and classified returns prepared in response to a 2007 DTA appeal.
320	Hozaifa Parhat	Parhat v. Gates	On June 23, 2008, a three judge panel reviewed the evidence used to justify Parhat's designation as an "enemy combatant" and ruled that he had never been an enemy combatant after all.
328	Hammad Memet [sic]		By August 18, 2008, both unclassified and classified returns prepared in response to a 2007 DTA appeal.
433	Jawad Jabbar Sadkhan Al-Sahlani	Case No. 07-1149	Jawad also has a Petition under the Detainee Treatment Act of 2005 ("DTA") pending in the Court of Appeals for the District of Columbia, Case No. 07-1149. On June 21, 2007, Jawad filed a classified Motion for Production and Protective Order requesting two specific categories of exculpatory evidence known to be in the Government's possession and now sought in this habeas corpus action. This motion has been fully briefed in the Court of Appeals since July 9, 2007, and the Government continues to refuse to produce clearly exculpatory evidence. The Government asked that Jawad's DTA action be stayed. Jawad opposed this request, noting that the Supreme Court has held that "both the DTA and the CSRT process remain intact". Boumediene v. Bush, 533 U.S. ___, slip op. at 66 (June 12, 2008).
584	Adel Noori		no factual returns, other than one through a Freedom of Information Act request filed by the Associated Press.
684	Mohammed Abdullah Taha Mattan		On July 18, 2008, Sozi P. Tulante filed a Status Report that states a DTA appeal was initiated on his behalf. By August 18, 2008, both unclassified and classified returns prepared in response to a 2007 DTA appeal.
841	Hani Saleh Rashid Abdullah [sic]		On July 18, 2008, Charles H. Carpenter (American lawyer) filed a Status Report where he wrote that Abdullah had a DTA appeal filed on his behalf.
968	Bismullah	Bismullah v. Gates	Bismullah's case has been the subject of multiple filings as to the scope that detainees' attorneys should be given to the material behind the summarized allegation.
975	Karim Bostan [sic]		On July 18, 2008 when Michael Caruso re-initiated Bostan's habeas petition he stated that he had an outstanding DTA appeal.
10020	Majid Khan		The government's position that Khan may not use in his habeas case presumptively classified information obtained in connection with his DTA case stands in direct contrast to the position taken by the government in other Guantanamo detainee habeas cases. See, e.g., Resp'ts' Resp. to Uighur Pet'rs' Motion to Use CSRTs Provided in DTA Action in this Case at 1-2, In re Guantanamo Bay Detainee Litigation, Misc. No. 08-442 (TFH) (D.D.C. filed August 1, 2008) (dkt. no. 228) ("Subject to adherence to the standard protective orders entered in each of the habeas cases, respondents agree that these petitioners may use the classified CSRT records already filed in their DTA action here in their habeas cases, as long as that is done in a manner consistent with the protective orders.").
