= Kiyemba v. Bush =

Kiyemba v. Bush (Civil Action No. 05-cv-01509) is a petition for habeas corpus filed on behalf of Jamal Kiyemba, a Ugandan citizen formerly held in extrajudicial detention in the United States' Guantanamo Bay detention camps, in Cuba. Mr. Kiyemba is the next friend of each of the nine Uighur petitioners, Abdusabur, Abdusamad, Abdunasir, Hammad, Hudhaifa, Jalaal, Khalid, Saabir, and Saadiq, who seek the writ of habeas corpus through the petition

Sabin Willett, Susan Baker Manning and a team of Bingham McCutchen lawyers are counsel for his petition, and those of nine other men whose petitions were attached to his.

Kiyemba was released in 2006; and all Uyghur detainees at Guantanamo Bay had been released by 2013.

== Military Commissions Act ==
The Military Commissions Act of 2006 mandated that Guantanamo captives were no longer entitled to access the US civil justice system, so all outstanding habeas corpus petitions were stayed.

== Boumediene v. Bush ==
On June 12, 2008, the United States Supreme Court ruled, in Boumediene v. Bush, that the Military Commissions Act could not remove the right for Guantanamo captives to access the US Federal Court system. And all previous Guantanamo captives' habeas petitions were eligible to be re-instated.

== Re-initiation ==
On July 18, 2008 George M. Clarke III filed a "Uighur petitioners' status report" on behalf of the seventeen Uyghur captives in Guantanamo. In the status report Clarke named seven Uyghur captives whose habeas petitions were amalgamated with Kiyemba v. Bush. Their names were: Abdul Nasser, Abdul Sabour, Abdul Semet, Hammad Memet, Huzaifa Parhat, Jalal Jalaldin, Khalid Ali and Sabir Osman.

On 2008-07-22 Susan Baker Manning filed a "Huzaifa Parhat's motion for judgment on his habeas petition ordering release into the continental United States" in Civil Action No. 05-cv-1509 (RMU).

On 2008-07-23 Manning filed a "NOTICE OF FILING" on behalf of Abdusabur Doe (ISN 275).

On 2008-07-25 Manning filed a "Huzaifa Parhat's motion for immediate release on parole into the continental United States pending final judgment on his habeas petition".

On 2008-08-15 Manning filed a "REPLY OF HUZAIFA PARHAT TO GOVERNMENT'S OPPOSITION TO MOTIONS FOR PAROLE AND JUDGMENT ORDERING RELEASE".

On 2008-10-01 Manning filed a "PETITIONERS' SUPPLEMENTAL MEMORANDUM IN RESPONSE TO GOVERNMENT'S NOTICE OF STATUS".

On 2008-10-07 Manning filed a "PETITIONERS' PROFFER REGARDING AVAILABLE SERVICES AND SUPPORT FOR RESETTLEMENT IN THE UNITED STATES".

On 2008-10-07 Manning filed a "[Proposed] order".

On 2008-10-22 Manning filed an "Emergency motion for order related to counsel visit of October 27, 2008".

== Appeal ==
After the men were ordered to be released by the US District Court the Department of Justice appealed that ruling to a panel of court of appeals. The Court of Appeals ruled that the courts lacked the authority to force men held in Guantanamo to be released on US territory.

== Kiyemba v. Obama, also known as Kiyemba I ==
One of the unresolved issues raised by the re-initiation of the Guantanamo captives' habeas petitions is whether Federal civilian judges have the authority to order the Executive Branch to set captives free in the United States. The United States Supreme Court ruled in a per curiam decision on March 1, 2010, in the case of the Kiyemba petitioners, over whether the Judicial Branch has that authority. The court found that no court had yet ruled on this case in light of the offers of resettlement. Therefore, the Supreme Court declined to rule on the question of whether a federal court has the right to release the prisoners held at Guantanamo Bay, as, per the ruling, the Supreme Court is a court of review, not of first view.

In 2009 the State Department was able to get Bermuda to offer residency to four of the Uyghur captives. A delegation from the small Pacific Ocean State of Palau visited the Uyghurs in Guantanamo, and eventually offered residency to all but one of the Uyghur captives.

The one Uyghur captive for whom Palau decline to offer residence was Arkin Mahmud, who had travelled to Afghanistan to look for his younger brother, Bahtiyar Mahnut, who their family was concerned had disappeared into Afghanistan. He was one of the eldest Uyghurs, and, he became seriously mentally ill in Guantanamo—ill-enough that Palau did not feel that it had the mental health support infrastructure to heal him. His younger brother felt that he could not abandon the brother who had only travelled to Afghanistan to try to rescue him.

In February Switzerland accepted the two brothers, leaving only five Uyghurs in Guantanamo. Since the other five remaining Uyghurs have been offered residency in Palau some legal scholars have speculated that the Supreme Court will decline to rule on the Kiyemba habeas, because they have the option of moving to Palau.

== Kiyemba II ==
Kiyemba II is the name for habeas corpus petitions filed on behalf of ten Guantanamo captives, who fear being repatriated to their country of citizenship. In April 2009 a three judge panel of DC Circuit Court of Appeals reversed the ruling of District Court Judges, stating that they had no authority to rule whether the executive branch could send captives back to their home countries, when they feared torture or other abuse there. On September 10, 2010, the entire court sat to review the case, en banc. Their decision was split six to five, confirming their colleagues ruling. However the five dissenters wrote a long opinion, and commentators have speculated that the case will be heard before the Supreme Court. The Supreme Court declined to hear the case on April 18, 2011.
