= Abu Bakker Qassim =

Uyghur refugee and former Guantanamo Bay detainee

- Born: May 13, 1969 (age 57); Ghulja, Xinjiang, China
- Detained at: Guantanamo
- ISN: 283
- Charge: No charge (held in extrajudicial detention)
- Status: Determined not to have been an enemy combatant after all. Transferred to an Albanian refugee camp.

Abu Bakker Qassim (born May 13, 1969) is a Uyghur from China's western frontier, Xinjiang Uyghur Autonomous Region who was held in the United States Guantanamo Bay detention camps, in Cuba. His Guantanamo Internment Serial Number was 283.

After being classified as "no longer enemy combatant" by the Combatant Status Review Tribunal he continued to be held in Cuba, in Camp Iguana until he was released and transferred to Albania. On September 17, 2006, he published an op-ed on The New York Times to ask the American lawmakers and people not to eliminate habeas corpus.

== Background ==
In late 2001, Qassim was captured along with his compatriot A'Del Abdu al-Hakim by Pakistani bounty hunters. Qassim and al-Hakim were transferred to U.S. custody by the Pakistani forces and held in Afghanistan for approximately six months, and were transferred to "Camp Delta," on the Guantanamo Bay Naval Base, where they were detained as "enemy combatants." President Bush had ruled that the detainees were "illegal combatants" by administrative fiat. Following legal challenges, the Bush administration was forced to provide a mechanism to review the Guantanamo detainees status.

== Combatant Status Review ==
Abu Bakr Oasim's Guantanamo detainee assessment

Qassim was among the 60% of prisoners who participated in the tribunal hearings. A Summary of Evidence memo was prepared for the tribunal of each detainee. The memo for his hearing lists the following:

=== Transcript ===
Qassim chose to participate in his Combatant Status Review Tribunal. On March 3, 2006, in response to a court order from Jed Rakoff the Department of Defense published a ten-page summarized transcript from his Combatant Status Review Tribunal.

He is one of approximately two dozen Uyghur captives accused by security officials of membership in the Eastern Turkistan Islamic Movement, which China considers to be both terrorist and secessionist in nature.

Documents released in response to the writ of habeas corpus Hassan Anvar v. George W. Bush contained a December 30, 2004 memo which provided one-paragraph information of 22 Uyghur detainees, all the detainees faced allegations from Joint Task Force Guantanamo intelligence officials of having received training at an ETIM training camp.

The information about Abu Bakker Qassim stated:

Abu Bakr Qasim is a 35-year-old ethnic Uighur and a Chinese citizen, born in 1969, in Ghulja, China. He claims to have fled China in an effort to escape Chinese oppression of the Uigher [sic] people. After fleeing China, the detainee traveled to Afghanistan. He was last interviewed in mid-2004. He has no reported incidents of violence in his discipline history. Qasim is suspected as being a probable member of the East Turkistan Islamic Movement (ETIM). He is suspected of having received training in an ETIM training camp in Afghanistan.

== Determined not to have been an enemy combatant ==
The Washington Post reports that Qasim was one of 38 detainees who was determined not to have been an enemy combatant during his Combatant Status Review Tribunal. The Department of Defense refers to these men as No Longer Enemy Combatants.

=== Reclassification ===
In March 2005, the Combatant Status Review Tribunal finalized its determination that they were no longer enemy combatants. Qassim and Hakim were not informed of this determination until May 2005. The United States did not release the men, but did not return them to China because to do so would be a violation of US law prohibiting the deportation of individuals to countries where they would likely be tortured. The U.S. refused to admit them to the United States. Qassim, Hakim and other non-enemy combatants who could not be repatriated were transferred from the general prison population to Camp Iguana in August 2005.

Qassim was one of the 38 detainees whose Combatant Status Review Tribunal concluded he had not been an "illegal combatants". Some of those detainees were repatriated after the determination was made. Others, such as, Qassim, and Sami Al Laithi, face possible torture if they are returned.

== Seeking asylum ==
In March 2005, attorneys for Qassim challenged his continued detention by filing a Petition for a Writ of Habeas Corpus in federal district court in Washington DC in the case of Qassim v. Bush. In December Judge James Robertson reviewed the detention of Qassim and A'Del Abdu al-Hakim. Robertson declared that their "indefinite imprisonment at Guantanamo Bay is unlawful," but also ruled on separation of powers grounds that he did not have the power to order their release into the United States. Qassim and Hakim immediately appealed.

A February 18, 2006, article in The Washington Times reported that Abu Bakker Qassim and A'Del Abdu al-Hakim had received military training in Afghanistan. It said they were not classified as "illegal combatants" because they intended to go home and employ their training against the Chinese government. Some earlier reports had described them as economic refugees, who were slowly working their way to Turkey.

On April 17, 2006, the US Supreme Court rejected Qassim's request to hear his appeal. His appeal was scheduled to be heard by the US Court of Appeals for the District of Columbia Circuit on May 8, 2006.

== Asylum in Albania ==
A lawsuit demanding release from Guantanamo was scheduled by the attorneys for five of the Uyghur captives who had been determined to have not been enemy combatants, including Abu Bakker Qassim, to take place in the US District Court on May 8, 2006. However, three days before the trial it was announced that Albania had offered to accept patriation of all five prisoners. The same day, the Department of Justice filed an "Emergency Motion to Dismiss as Moot", asking that the trial be cancelled. Attorney Barbara Olshansky characterized the sudden transfer as an attempt to "avoid having to answer in court for keeping innocent men in jail""

== Press reports ==
On May 24, 2006, Abu Bakr Qasim told interviewers that he and his compatriots felt isolated in Albania. Qasim described his disappointment with the United States, who the Uyghurs had been hoping would support the Uyghurs quest for Uyghur autonomy.

In an interview with ABC News in May 2006, Qasim said that members of the American-Uyghur community had come forward and assured the American government that they would help him and his compatriots adapt to life in America, if they were given asylum in America.

To the BBC he said in January 2007 that "Guantanamo was a five-year nightmare, We're trying to forget it."

On June 15, 2008, the McClatchy News Service published articles based on interviews with 66 former Guantanamo captives. McClatchy reporters interviewed Abu Baqr Qassim. According to the McClatchy reporters his translators encouraged him to hope, while the American guards treated him with brutality:

America has always helped the Uighurs. The American translators told us not to worry, we were merely in the wrong place at the wrong time. We weren't enemies. We were Uighurs.

According to the McClatchy report, Sabin Willet told them that China:

...argued to the United Nations that Uighurs should be branded a terrorist organization, in part because they'd been using "art and literature" to "distort historical facts".

Abu Baqr Qassim described realizing he had to learn Arabic if he was ever to get out of Guantanamo. When he was transferred to lighter security in a dormitory shared with Arabic speakers and other Uyghurs, they set about taking informal Arabic lessons. Abu Baqr Qassim told reporters the Uyghurs request for paper, to make notes, was denied—although the Guantanamo policy states that captives were to be issued a certain number of pages per month, for sending mail. He was punished by being sent to solitary confinement when guards found he had used napkins to take notes. When he got an attorney, and that attorney brought him books, so he could learn English, guards confiscated the books.

Now that he is in Albania, and his prospects of ever getting a passport or visa seem slim, he has started learning Albanian.

On September 28, 2009, The Washington Post quoted Abu Bakker's reaction to the "difficult and sad" decision of fellow Uyghur captive Bahtiyar Mahnut to remain in Guantanamo, rather than accept an asylum offer from the government of Palau. His older brother Arkin Mahnut had traveled to Afghanistan because their family was worried about Bathiyar. Of the Uyghurs remaining in Guantanamo Arkin was the only one not offered asylum in Palau, because he became mentally ill in Guantanamo, and there were no facilities in Palau to treat his mental illness. Abu Bakker said:

This is just very difficult and sad. Bahtiyar is turning away freedom for his brother. His brother is only there because of Bahtiyar. I feel sorry for both of them.
