= No longer enemy combatant =

U.S. term for 38 Guantanamo detainees

No Longer Enemy Combatant (NLEC) is a term used by the U.S. military for a group of 38 Guantanamo detainees whose Combatant Status Review Tribunal (CSRT) determined they were not "enemy combatants". None of them were released right away. Ten of them were allowed to move to the more comfortable Camp Iguana. Others, such as Sami Al Laithi, remained in solitary confinement.

Thirty-eight detainees were finally classified as NLECs. The fifth Denbeaux report, "No-hearing hearings", reported that an additional three Combatant Status Review Tribunals determined that captives should not have been determined to have been enemy combatants, only to have their recommendation overturned.

The Washington Post has published a list of the names of 30 of the 38 individuals who were determined not to have been enemy combatants.

The delay in the release of some of the detainees was said to be due to considerations of their safety. Some could not be returned to their home countries, out of fears of retaliation from their fellow citizens, or from the governments of their countries. Some, like Al Laithi, were returned to their home countries after the US secured a promise that they would not be punished by their home countries. Others, like five of the Uyghur detainees in Guantanamo, were released when the US found a third country which would accept them.

Three further captives who had been determined not to have been enemy combatants, who had been occupants of Camp Iguana since May 2005, were released in Albania in November 2006.

== Multiple CSRTs ==
The fifth Denbeaux study, entitled "No-hearing hearings", revealed that some Guantanamo captives had second or third Combatant Status Review Tribunals convened when their first tribunal determined that they had not been enemy combatants after all.

H. Candace Gorman, the pro bono lawyer for Abdel Hamid Ibn Abdussalem Ibn Mifta Al Ghazzawi, expressed surprise when she learned that her client had initially been determined not to have been an enemy combatant, after all. Gorman described traveling to the secure site in Virginia, the only place where lawyers were allowed to review their clients' classified files. She was told that the justification for convening her client's second tribunal had been that the DoD had new evidence. However, when she reviewed the transcript of his second tribunal she found that there had been no new evidence.

Lieutenant Colonel Stephen Abraham came forward and swore an affidavit, describing his experience sitting on Al Ghazzawi's tribunal. It was critical of the process, including the pressure exerted to find against the detainee.

== NLEC captives ==
On 19 November 2007, the Department of Defense published a list of the 38 men finally deemed to be no longer enemy combatants in 2004.

NLEC captives
ISN	Name	Notes
142	Fazaldad	Returned to Pakistan on 17 September 2004
208	Maroof Saleemovich Salehove	Date of release to Tajikistan unknown
248	Saleh Abdall Al Oshan	Repatriated to Saudi custody on 20 July 2005
260	Ahmed Adil	Sent to Albania with four other Uyghurs
276	Akhdar Qasem Basit	Sent to Albania with four other Uyghurs
279	Mohammed Ayub	Sent to Albania with four other Uyghurs
283	Abu Bakr Qasim	Sent to Albania with four other Uyghurs
287	Sami Abdul Aziz Salim Allaithy	Repatriated to Egypt, after assurances
293	Adel Abdulhehim	Sent to Albania with four other Uyghurs
298	Salih Uyar	Released to Turkey on 18 April 2005
357	Abdul Rahman	Date of return to Afghanistan unknown.
457	Mohammad Gul	Returned to Afghanistan on 18 April 2005
459	Gul Zaman	Returned to Afghanistan on 18 April 2005
491	Sadik Ahmad Turkistani	Uyghur born in Saudi Arabia, repatriated to Saudi Arabia
561	Abdul Rahim Muslimdost	Released to Pakistan, disappeared mysteriously
581	Shed Abdur Rahman	Date of release to Pakistan unknown
586	Karam Khamis Sayd Khamsan	Date of release to Pakistan unknown; charged with attempting to assassinate US ambassador to Yemen in December 2005; acquitted on 13 March 2006
589	Khalid Mahomoud Abdul Wahab Al Asmr	Returned to Jordan on 19 July 2005
631	Padsha Wazir	Returned to Afghanistan on 18 April 2005
649	Mustaq Ali Patel	Returned to France on 7 March 2005
672	Zakirjan Asam	Set free on 17 November 2006
712	Hammad Ali Amno Gadallah	Returned to Sudan on 19 July 2005
716	Allah Muhammed Saleem	Released to Albania on 7 January 2007, where he applied for asylum
718	Fethi Boucetta	Released to Albania rather than his home of Algeria
730	Ibrahim Fauzee	Citizen of the Maldives, release date unknown
812	Qalandar Shah	Returned to Afghanistan on 18 April 2005
834	Shahwali Zair Mohammed Shaheen Naqeebyllah	Returned to Afghanistan on 18 April 2005
835	Rasool Shahwali Zair Mohammed Mohammed	Returned to Afghanistan on 18 April 2005
929	Abdul Qudus	Youngest person ever detained at Guantanamo only 14 years old when he arrived in Guantanamo early 2002, he returned to Afghanistan on 18 April 2005
952	Shahzada	Returned to Afghanistan on 18 April 2005
953	Hammdidullah	Returned to Afghanistan on 18 April 2005
958	Mohammad Nasim	Returned to Afghanistan on 18 April 2005
986	Kako Kandahari	Returned to Afghanistan on 18 April 2005
1013	Feda Ahmed	Returned to Afghanistan on 18 April 2005
1019	Nasibullah	Returned to Afghanistan on 18 April 2005
1041	Habib Noor	Returned to Afghanistan on 18 April 2005
1117	Jalil	Returned to Afghanistan on 11 March 2005
1157	Hukumra Khan	Returned to Afghanistan on 18 April 2005

On 17 January 2009, Carol Rosenberg, writing in the Miami Herald, quoted Guantanamo spokesman Jeffrey Gordon, that a panel of officers had recently reviewed Bismullah's "enemy combatant" status, and determined, "based on new evidence", that he was not an enemy combatant after all. Bismullah was released to Afghanistan on 17 January.

== See also ==
- Seton Hall study
- Statelessness
- Lists of former Guantanamo Bay detainees alleged to have returned to terrorism
- Timeline of the release and transfer of Guantanamo Bay detainees
