= Ahmad Tourson =

Uyghur refugee and former Guantanamo Bay detainee

- Born: January 26, 1971 (age 55); Xinjiang Province, China
- Arrested: 2001; Mazar-i-Sharif, Afghanistan; Afghan National Army
- Released: October 2009; Republic of Palau
- Citizenship: Chinese
- Detained at: Guantanamo Bay detention camp
- Other name: Ahmad Abdulahad
- ISN: 201
- Alleged to be a member of: Sharq (East) Turkistan Islamic Partiyisa [sic]
- Status: Released

Ahmad Tourson or Ahmad Abdulahad, is a Uyghur refugee unlawfully detained for more than seven years in the United States Guantanamo Bay detainment camps. The detention occurred despite becoming clear early on that he was innocent. The Department of Defense reports that Tourson was born on January 26, 1971, in Xinjiang Province, China, and assigned him the Internment Serial Number 201. Tourson is one of approximately two dozen detainees from the Uighur ethnic group.

He won his habeas corpus in 2008. Judge Ricardo Urbina declared his detention as unlawful and ordered that he be set free in the United States. He was sent to Palau in October 2009.

== Combatant Status Review ==
Tourson was among the 60% of prisoners who participated in the tribunal hearings. A Summary of Evidence memo was prepared for the tribunal of each detainee. The memo for his hearing lists the following allegations:

a. The detainee is an al Qaeda fighter:
1. The detainee stated that he left China during September 2000 [sic] and traveled to Kabul, Afghanistan, by way of Kyrgyzstan and Pakistan.
2. The detainee stated that he was a member of the East Turkistan Islamic Movement (ETIM) AKA Sharq (East) Turkistan Islamic Partiyisa [sic] (STIP).
3. ETIM is an extremist Islamic organization operating in the eastern region of China.
4. The detainee was captured near Mazir-E-Sharif [sic], Afghanistan by General Dostum's troops, taken to the Qalai Janghi [sic] Prison and later turned over to U.S. Forces.

b. The detainee participated in military operations against the United States or its coalition partners.
1. The detainee stated that he was trained to use an AK-47 rifle.
2. The detainee stated that he traveled to Konduz, AF and then on to Mazir-E-Sharif [sic] to fight against General Dostum's troops.
3. The detainee was a prisoner at the Qalai Janghi [sic]/Mazir-E-Sharif [sic] Prison during the Mazir-E-Sharif [sic] Prison Riot.

== Ahmad Tourson v. George W. Bush ==
A writ of habeas corpus, Ahmad Tourson v. George W. Bush, was submitted on Ahmad Tourson's behalf. In response, on 4 January 2007, the Department of Defense released 29 pages of unclassified documents related to his Combatant Status Review Tribunal.

His enemy combatant status was confirmed, by Tribunal panel 7 on November 5, 2004. His Tribunal recorded:

When considered in conjunction with the classified evidence, the detainee's testimony was not persuasive.

== Administrative Review Board hearing ==
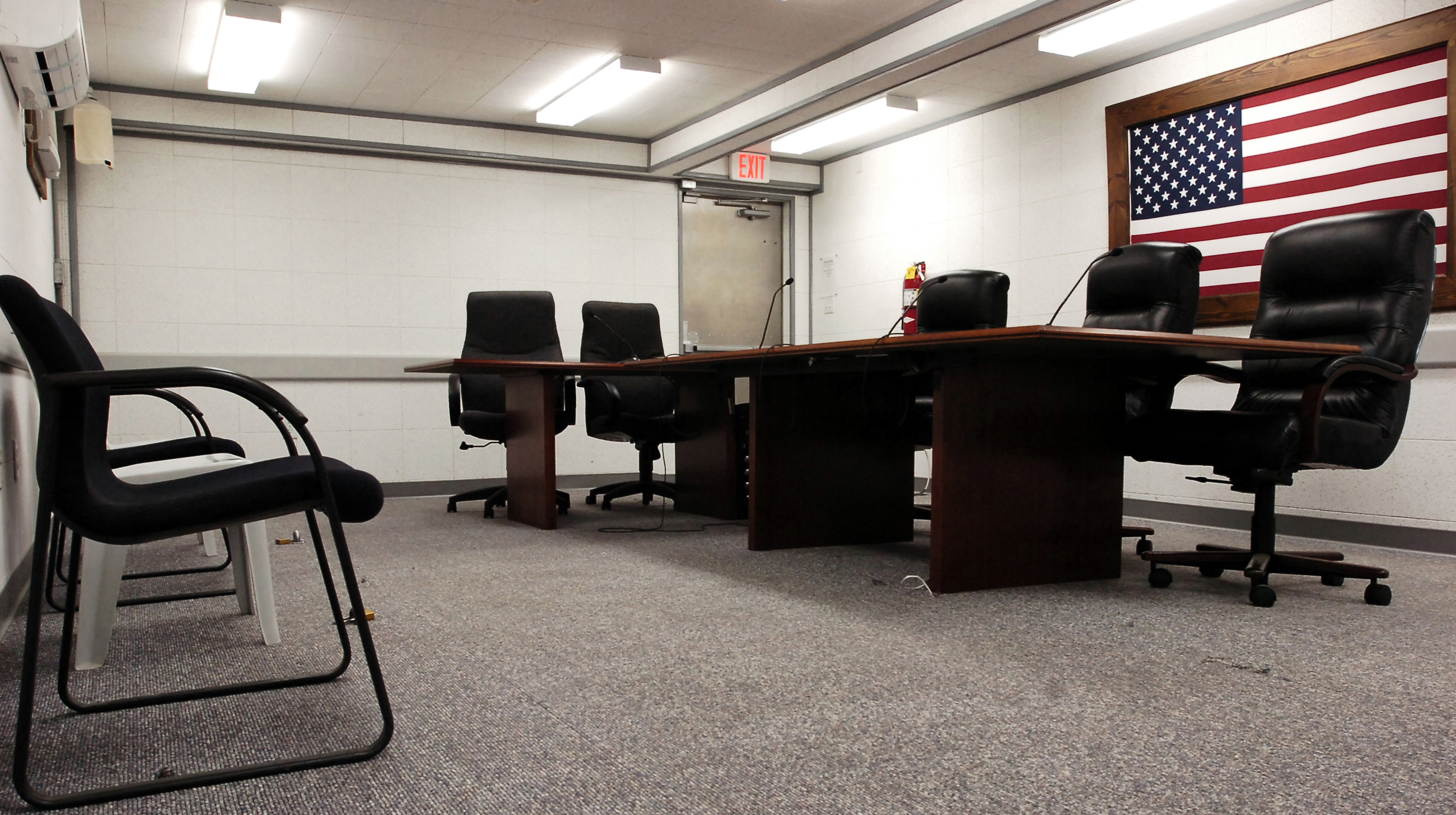
Hearing room where Guantanamo captive's annual Administrative Review Board hearings convened for captives whose Combatant Status Review Tribunal had already determined they were an "enemy combatant".

Detainees who were determined to have been properly classified as "enemy combatants" were scheduled to have their dossier reviewed at annual Administrative Review Board hearings. The Administrative Review Boards weren't authorized to review whether a detainee qualified for POW status, and they weren't authorized to review whether a detainee should have been classified as an "enemy combatant".

They were authorized to consider whether a detainee should continue to be detained by the United States, because they continued to pose a threat—or whether they could safely be repatriated to the custody of their home country, or whether they could be set free.

=== Summary of Evidence memo ===
A Summary of Evidence memo was prepared for Ahmad Tourson's Administrative Review Board, on August 11, 2005. The memo listed factors for and against his continued detention.

The following primary factors favor continued detention

a. Commitment
1. The detainee traveled from the Xingjiang Province of Chine to Bishkek, Kyrgyzstan Bishkek, Kyrgyzstan, then on to Karachi, Pakistan, to Islamabad, Pakistan, and finally Kabul, Afghanistan. He arrived there sometime between late September and early October 2000 [sic].
2. While in Kabul, the detainee stayed at a guesthouse run by the East Turkistan Islamic Movement (ETIM).
3. The Eastern Turkistan Islamic Movement (ETIM) is a small Islamic extremist group based in China's western Xinjiang Province. It is one of the most militant of the ethnic Uighur separatist groups pursuing an independent "Eastern Turkistan", which would include Turkey, Kazakhstan, Kyrgyzstan, Pakistan, Afghanistan, and Zinjiang.
4. ETIM, reportedly with financial support and direction from Usama Bin Laden, recruits within remote areas of eastern China and ships recruits to training camps in Afghanistan. These recruits then return to China to conduct terrorist activities and extend their influence. Training has included religious extremist theory, terrorism, explosives and assassination. Some training camps also include the manufacturing of weapons, ammunition, and explosive devices.

Uighur refugees.

1. Abdullah, a fellow Uighur, convinced the detainee to travel with him to Konduz, Afghanistan, to see the war. Once in Konduz, the two arrived at a safe house where armed Uzbeks were staying. They said they were members of the Islamic Movement of Uzbekistan (IMU).
2. The Secretary of State has designated the Islamic Movement of Uzbekistan (IMU) as a Foreign Terrorist Organization (FTO). The IMU is a coalition of Islamic militants from Uzbekistan and other Central Asian states opposed to Uzbekistani [sic] President Islom Karimov's secular regime. Although the IMU's primary goal remains to overthrow Karimov and establish an Islamic state in Uzbekistan, IMU political and ideological leader Tohir Yoldashev is working to rebuild the organization and appears to have widened the IMU's targets to include all those he perceives as fighting Islam.

b. Training

c. Connections/Associations
1. While in Pakistan, the detainee became involved with Sharq East Turkistan Islamic Partiyisa [sic] (STIP).
2. STIP is one of several extremist Islamic organization operating in the eastern region of China. These organizations attempt to unite all Turkic-speaking Muslims and form a political-religious state in China's Xinjiang Province.
3. The detainee said the Taliban was aware of the STIP organization located at the facility and that they would often visit the facility. He worked there for 10 months.

d. Other Relevant Data

The detainee was captured near Mazar-E Sharif, Afghanistan, by General Dostum's troops, taken to the Qalai Janghi Prison and later turned over to United States forces.

The following primary factors favor release or transfer

The detainee stated he did not wish to fight, however, he did want to work.

== Status from 2005 to 2008 ==
Five Uyghurs, whose CSR Tribunals determined they had not been enemy combatants, were transferred to detention in an Albanian refugee camp in 2006. A man who was born to Uyghur parents, in Saudi Arabia, and thus was considered a Uyghur, was nevertheless returned to Saudi Arabia. All the other Uyghurs remain in Guantanamo.

In September 2007, the Department of Defense released all the Summary of Evidence memos prepared for the Administrative Review Boards convened in 2006. While a Board reviewed his status in 2005 no Board reviewed his status in 2006.

In September 2007, the Department of Defense released the recommendation memos from 133 of the Administrative Review Boards that convened in 2005 and the recommendation memos from 55 of the Administrative Review Boards that convened in 2006. No recommendation memos were released for Ahmad Tourson.

On June 12, 2008, the United States Supreme Court restored the Guantanamo captives' access to the USA's civilian justice system in its ruling on Boumediene v. Bush. Specifically it re-initiated the captives' habeas corpus petitions. In an unrelated development Huzaifa Parhat's DTA appeal concluded that his Combatant Status Review Tribunal had erred in confirming he was an "enemy combatant", due to insufficient evidence. The Department of Justice had the option of appealing the ruling, claiming it had new evidence. The Uyghurs' habeas petitions were the first to be scheduled for review. In September 2008, days before the Department of Justice would have been expected to offer a justification in court for the Uyghurs' detention, and after six and half years of extrajudicial detention, the Department of Justice acknowledged the evidence to justify their detention did not exist.

== Temporary Asylum in Palau ==
In June 2009, the government of Palau announced that they would offer temporary asylum to some of the Uyghurs. The government of Palau sent a delegation to Guantanamo, and interviewed some of the remaining Uyghurs. Some of the Uyghurs declined to be interviewed by the Palauns. In the end the government of Palau offered asylum to twelve of the remaining thirteen Uyghurs. Palau declined to offer asylum to one of the Uyghurs who suffered from a mental disorder, brought on by detention, that was too profound to be treated in Palau.

On October 31, 2009, Ahmad Tourson, Abdul Ghappar Abdul Rahman, Edham Mamet, Anwar Hassan, Dawut Abdurehim, and Adel Noori were released and transferred to Palau.

On June 29, 2015, Nathan Vanderklippe, reporting in The Globe and Mail, wrote that all the Uyghurs had quietly left Palau. The Globe confirmed that Palau's agreement to give refuge to the Uyghurs was reached after the USA agreed to various secret payments. Those payments included $93,333 to cover each Uyghur's living expenses. The Globe confirmed that controversy still surrounded former President Johnson Toribiong who had used some of those funds to billet the Uyghurs in houses belonging to his relatives.

Vanderklippe reported that the men had never felt they could fit in with the Palauans. Some of the men compared Palau with a lusher, larger Guantanamo. Some of the men were able to bring their wives to Palau. Attempts to hold most regular jobs failed, due to cultural differences. Attempts to use their traditional leather-working skills to be self-employed failed. Eventually, all six men were employed as night-time security guards, a job that did not require interaction with Palauans.

Tragically, one of the men's young toddler, conceived and born on Palau, died after he fell off a balcony. According to Vanderklippe, the men's departure from Palau was quietly arranged with the cooperation of American officials. He reported they left, one or two at a time, on commercial flights. Palauan officials would not share the Uyghurs' destinations.
