= Alan Kay (judge) =

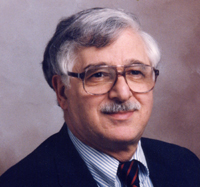

United States magistrate judge for the United States District Court for the District of Columbia
- Incumbent
- Assumed office September 1991

Personal details
- Education: George Washington University; George Washington University National Law Center
- Profession: Judge

Alan Kay is a United States magistrate judge for the United States District Court for the District of Columbia.

== Education ==
Judge Kay received his bachelor's degree in 1957 from the George Washington University, and his Juris Doctor in 1959 from the George Washington University Law School.

== Legal career ==
Judge Kay began his legal career as a law clerk for Judge Alexander Holtzoff and Judge William B. Jones, both of the United States District Court for the District of Columbia. From 1959 to 1967, Judge Kay worked as a public defender for the Public Defender Service, and as a federal prosecutor for the United States Attorney's Office in the District of Columbia. From 1967 until his appointment, he worked in private practice as a named partner at the Washington law firm of Bregman, Abell & Kay. He became a United States magistrate judge for the United States District Court for the District of Columbia in September 1991.

== Notable Cases ==
=== Rulings on Guantanamo habeas corpus petitions ===
Judge Kay heard several habeas corpus petitions submitted on behalf of detainees held in extrajudicial detention in the United States's Guantanamo Bay detention camps in Cuba. Judge Kay ruled on issues arising from the "Protective Order" that governed legal counsel's access to detainees. Judge Kay's opinions have been quoted extensively by national news organizations.

In Adem v. Bush, 425 F. Supp. 2d 7 (D.D.C. 2006), Judge Kay ordered the Bush administration to stop blocking private attorneys from meeting with their clients at the Guantanamo Bay detention camp. In 2004, detainee Salim Muhood Adem had asked for a lawyer to help challenge his potentially indefinite detention without charge by the United States. Attorneys volunteered to represent Adem and requested permission to meet with their potential client. The United States, however, refused the attorneys access for over a year, insisting that the attorneys were first required to provide evidence of their authority to represent Adem. Because the attorneys could not access their client to obtain the authorization, Judge Kay characterized the government's position as a "catch 22." Judge Kay held that the Protective Order does not require evidence of authority to represent a detainee as a prerequisite to counsel meeting with a detainee. Rather, the Protective Order requires that counsel provide evidence of their authority within 10 days of counsel's second visit with the detainee.

In Kiyemba v. Bush, Judge Kay addressed the same issue as in Adem v. Bush, and held that the Protective Order does not require evidence of authority to represent a detainee as a prerequisite to counsel meeting with a detainee. The only difference between the Kiyemba and Adem was that Kiyemba was filed as a "next friend" petition, and Adem was filed as a direct petition. Judge Kay found that this was a distinction without a difference with respect to the Protective Order's requirements.

The government further argued that the Detainee Treatment Act of 2005 divested the Court of jurisdiction to decide Guantanamo habeas cases. Judge Kay found that the question of whether the existing Protective Order permitted detainees to meet with their lawyers had no bearing on the question of whether the Court had jurisdiction to review the merits of detainees' challenges to their detention.

=== Miguel Tejada's steroid case ===
Judge Kay accepted former Oakland Athletics's baseball player Miguel Tejada's guilty plea to lying before Congress in 2005 about his ex-teammate's use of steroids. Tejada told Congress "he had no knowledge of other players using or even talking about steroids or other banned substances." However, a Mitchell Report on drugs in Major League Baseball cited Oakland Athletics outfielder Adam Piatt with saying he discussed steroid use with Tejada and provided Tejada with testosterone and HGH.

=== Jack Abramoff corruption ===
Judge Kay accepted a guilty plea from Roger Stillwell, a former employee of the Interior Department Office of Insular Affairs, who failed to report gifts he received from lobbyist Jack Abramoff.

=== 2011 White House Shooting ===
Oscar Ramiro Ortega-Hernandez appeared before Judge Kay after firing rifle shots at the White House in attempt to assassinate President Obama.

=== Gyrocopter on the U.S. Capitol lawn ===
Douglas Mark Hughes appeared before Judge Kay after landing his gyrocopter on the west lawn of the United States Capitol to protest campaign finance laws.

=== 2015 Thanksgiving White House fence jumper ===
Joseph Caputo appeared before Judge Kay after jumping the White House fence while wrapped in an American flag. The fence jumping occurred while President Obama and his family were inside celebrating Thanksgiving.

=== James Rosen warrant ===
Judge Kay authorized the controversial warrant allowing monitoring of Fox News journalist James Rosen.
