= Dawut Abdurehim =

Uyghur refugee and former Guantanamo Bay detainee

- Born: 1974 (age 51–52); Ghulja, Xinjiang, China
- Detained at: Guantanamo
- ISN: 289
- Charge: No charge (unlawfully detained)
- Status: Released

Dawut Abdurehim (Uyghur: داۋۇت ئابدۇرېھىم, born 1974) is a Uyghur refugee best known for the more than seven years he spent in the United States Guantanamo Bay detention camps, in Cuba. Abdulrehim is one of 22 Uyghurs who have been held in Guantanamo for many years despite it becoming clear early on that they were innocent.

He won his habeas corpus in 2008. Judge Ricardo Urbina declared his detention as unlawful and ordered that he be set free in the United States. He was sent to Palau in October 2009.

== Early life ==
American intelligence analysts estimate Abdurehim was born in 1974 in Ghulja, Xinjiang, China.

== Capture ==
After fleeing Afghanistan, Abdurehim was turned over to Pakistani authorities.

== Detention ==
American intelligence analysts assigned Abdurehim the Internment Serial Number 289.

== Combatant Status Review ==
Abdurehim was among the 60% of prisoners who chose to participate in tribunal hearings. A Summary of Evidence memo was prepared for the tribunal of each detainee.

Abdurehim's memo accused him of the following:

- The detainee is associated with the Taliban.
- The detainee is a citizen of China who traveled to Afghanistan, via Kyrgyzstan and Pakistan, to receive military training at a military training camp in the Tora Bora mountains.
- The detainee lived at the Uighur training camp from June to October 2001.
- The training camp was provided to the Uighers by the Taliban.
- The East Turkistan Islamic Movement (ETIM) operated facilities in the Tora Bora region of Afghanistan in which Uighur expatriates underwent small arms training. These camps were funded by bin Laden and the Taliban
- ETIM is listed on the state departments terrorist exclusion list.
- While at the camp, the detainee received training on the Kalashnikov rifle, handguns, and other weapons.
- Following the destruction of the training camp by the United States bombing campaign, the detainee traveled to a village in Pakistan where he was captured.

On March 3, 2006, in response to a court order from Jed Rakoff, the Department of Defense published a nine-page summarized transcript from his Combatant Status Review Tribunal.

== Dawut Abdurehim v. George W. Bush ==
A writ of habeas corpus, Dawut Abdurehim v. George W. Bush, was submitted on Dawut Abdurehim's behalf. In response, on September 8, 2006, the Department of Defense released 31 pages of unclassified documents related to his Combatant Status Review Tribunal.

=== Legal Sufficiency Review ===
His Combatant Status Review Tribunal's Legal Sufficiency Review was drafted on January 18, 2005, by Assistant Legal Advisor Commander Karen M. Gibbs.

His enemy combatant status was confirmed by Tribunal panel 12.

Gibbs noted that the Tribunal panel "substantially complied" with the rules set out for Tribunals conduct.

Gibbs noted

The Tribunal's decision that detainee #289 is properly classified as an enemy combatant was unanimous.

However, the CSRT "urges favourable consideration for the detainee's release," with no forcible return to China.

== Testimony on behalf of Abdul Razak ==
Dawut Abdurehim testified on behalf of Abdul Razak. Dawut Abdurehim testified that Abdul Razak had made two deliveries of food to the Uyghur camp, and that he was not involved in combat. Dawut Abdurehim confirmed that they had fled the American aerial bombardment of Afghanistan with the other Uyghurs, through the mountains, into Pakistan, where they were turned over to the Pakistani authorities.

On Abdul Razak's detainee election form Dawut Abdurehim's name was recorded as "Sabet".

Both men testified that they had not seen the other man be trained on or carry any weapons.

Abdul Razak testified that the camp was near a village he called Urhurl.

== Current status ==
Five Uyghurs, whose CSR Tribunals determined they had not been enemy combatants were transferred to detention in an Albanian refugee camp in 2006. A man who was born to Uyghur parents, in Saudi Arabia, and thus was considered a Uyghur, was nevertheless returned to Saudi Arabia. All the other Uyghurs remained in Guantanamo.

In September 2007, the Department of Defense released all the Summary of Evidence memos prepared for the Administrative Review Boards convened in 2006. There is no record that a Board reviewed his status in 2005 or 2006.

In September 2007, the Department of Defense released the recommendation memos from 133 of the Administrative Review Boards that convened in 2005 and the recommendation memos from 55 of the Administrative Review Boards that convened in 2006. No recommendation memos were released for Dawut Abdurehim.

On June 12, 2008, the United States Supreme Court restored the Guantanamo captives' access to the USA's civilian justice system in its ruling on Boumediene v. Bush. Specifically it re-initiated the captives' habeas corpus petitions. In an unrelated development Huzaifa Parhat's DTA appeal concluded that his Combatant Status Review Tribunal had erred in confirming he was an "enemy combatant", due to insufficient evidence. The Department of Justice had the option of appealing the ruling, claiming it had new evidence. The Uyghurs' habeas petitions were the first to be scheduled for review. In September 2008, days before the Department of Justice would have been expected to offer a justification in court for the Uyghurs' detention, and after six and half years of extrajudicial detention, the Department of Justice acknowledged the evidence to justify their detention did not exist.

== Temporary Asylum in Palau ==
In June 2009, the government of Palau announced that they would offer temporary asylum to some of the Uyghurs. The government of Palau sent a delegation to Guantanamo, and interviewed some of the remaining Uyghurs. Some of the Uyghurs declined to be interviewed by the Palauns. In the end the government of Palau offered asylum to twelve of the remaining thirteen Uyghurs. Palau declined to offer asylum to one of the Uyghurs who suffered from a mental disorder, brought on by detention, that was too profound to be treated in Palau.

On October 31, 2009, Abdulrehim, Ahmad Tourson, Abdul Ghappar Abdul Rahman, Edham Mamet, Anwar Hassan, and Adel Noori were released and transferred to Palau.

On June 29, 2015, Nathan Vanderklippe, reporting in The Globe and Mail, wrote that all the Uyghurs had quietly left Palau. The Globe confirmed that Palau's agreement to give refuge to the Uyghurs was reached after the USA agreed to various secret payments. Those payments included $93,333 to cover each Uyghurs living expenses. The Globe confirmed that controversy still surrounded former President Johnson Toribiong who had used some of those funds to billet the Uyghurs in houses belonging to his relatives.

Vanderklippe reported that the men had never felt they could fit in with the Palauns. Some of the men compared Palau with a lusher, larger Guantanamo. Some of the men were able to bring their wives to Palau. Attempts to hold most regular jobs failed, due to cultural differences. Attempts to use their traditional leather-working skills to be self-employed failed. Eventually, all six men were employed as night-time security guards, a job that did not require interaction with Palauns.

Tragically, one of the men's young toddler, conceived and born on Palau, died after he fell off a balcony. According to Vanderklippe, the men's departure from Palau was quietly arranged with the cooperation of American officials. He reported they left, one or two at a time, on commercial flights. Palaun officials would not share the Uyghurs' destination(s).
