= Edham Mamet =

Uyghur detainee at Guantanamo Bay

- Born: May 4, 1975 (age 51); Ghulja, Xinjiang, China
- Detained at: Guantanamo
- Other name: Nag Mohammed
- ISN: 102
- Status: Released

Edham Mamet (born May 4, 1975) (also Nag Mohammed) is a Uyghur refugee best known for the more than seven years he spent in the United States Guantanamo Bay detention camps, in Cuba. He was captured in Afghanistan in November 2001. Edham Mamet is one of the 22 Uighurs held in Guantanamo for many years despite the fact that it became clear early on that they were innocent.

He won his habeas corpus in 2008. Judge Ricardo Urbina declared his detention as unlawful and ordered to set him free in the United States. He was sent to Palau in October 2009.

== Early life ==
Joint Task Force Guantanamo counter-terrorism analysts estimate Nag Mohammed was born on May 4, 1975, in Ghulja, Xinjiang, China.

== Capture ==
Edham Mamet was captured in Afghanistan in November 2001.

== Determined not to be an enemy combatant after all ==
The Department of Justice announced on September 30, 2008, that Nag Mohammed, and the sixteen other Uyghurs who remained in Guantanamo, would no longer be treated as enemy combatants.

== Writ of Habeas Corpus ==
A writ of habeas corpus, Nag Mohammed v. George W. Bush, was submitted on Nag Mohammed's behalf. In response, on September 19, 2005, the Department of Defense released 30 pages of unclassified documents related to his Combatant Status Review Tribunal.

=== Denial of transfer to the USA ===
US District Court Judge Ricardo Urbina had scheduled the session where the Executive Branch would file the evidence that justified classifying the remaining Uyghurs as "enemy combatants" for October 7, 2008. On September 30, 2008, Gregory G. Katsas, the United States' Assistant Attorney General "notice of status" stated that the seventeen remaining Uyghur captives would no longer be treated as enemy combatants.

Lawyers for the Uyghurs pointed out that some of the Uyghurs remained in solitary confinement in Camp 6. And the Department of Defense agreed that since the men were no longer to be treated as enemy combatants they would all be transferred to Camp Iguana.

On October 7, 2008, when the Department of Justice did not file the evidence justifying classifying the Uyghurs as enemy combatants, he issued an order requiring the Department of Defense to bring the Uyghurs to his court on October 10, 2008.

On October 8, 2008, the Department of Justice filed an Emergency Motion. A three judge panel of Judges in the Washington Court of Appeals granted the Executive Branch a brief respite from complying with Judge Urbina's order. The panel schedule its hearing of the Executive Branch's justification for October 20, 2008.

On October 16, 2008, the Department of Justice filed its justification for restriction,

== Asylum in Palau ==
In June 2009, the government of Palau announced that they would offer temporary asylum to some of the Uyghurs. The government of Palau sent a delegation Guantanamo, and interviewed some of the remaining Uyghurs. Some of the Uyghurs declined to be interviewed by the Palauns. In the end the government of Palau offered asylum to twelve of the remaining thirteen Uyghurs. Palau declined to offer asylum to one of the Uyghurs who suffered from a mental disorder, brought on by detention, that was too profound to be treated in Palau.

On October 31, 2009 "Edham Mamet", Ahmad Tourson, Abdul Ghappar Abdul Rahman, Anwar Hassan, Dawut Abdurehim and Adel Noori were released and transferred to Palau.

On June 29, 2015, Nathan Vanderklippe, reporting in The Globe and Mail, wrote that all the Uyghurs had quietly left Palau. The Globe confirmed that Palau's agreement to give refuge to the Uyghurs was reached after the USA agreed to various secret payments. Those payments included $93,333 to cover each Uyghur's living expenses. The Globe confirmed that controversy still surrounded former President Johnson Toribiong who had used some of those funds to billet the Uyghurs in houses belonging to his relatives.

Vanderklippe reported that the men had never felt they could fit in with the Palauns. Some of the men compared Palau with a lusher, larger Guantanamo. Some of the men were able to bring their wives to Palau. Attempts to hold most regular jobs failed, due to cultural differences. Attempts to use their traditional leather-working skills to be self-employed failed. Eventually, all six men were employed as night-time security guards, a job that did not require interaction with Palauns.

Tragically, one of the men's young toddler, conceived and born on Palau, died after he fell off a balcony. According to Vanderklippe, the men's departure from Palau was quietly arranged with cooperation with American officials. He reported they left, one or two at a time, on commercial flights. Palaun officials would not share the Uyghurs destination.
