= Tarek Hussein =

Egyptian lawyer (born 1993)

Tarek Hussein طارق حسين
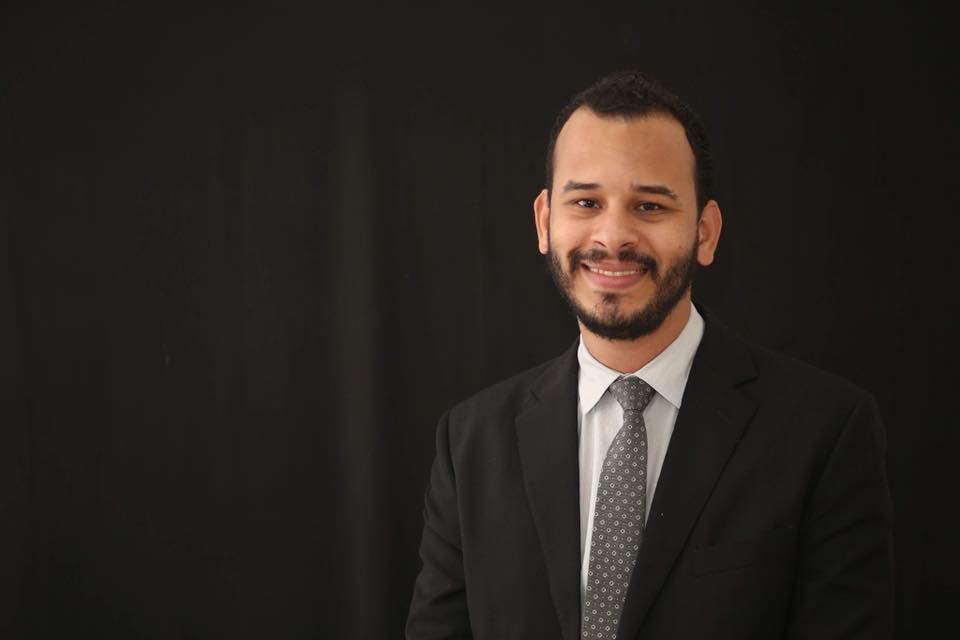
- Born: Tarek Mohamed Ahmed Hussein; 15 August 1993 (age 32); Cairo, Egypt
- Education: Faculty of Law
- Occupations: lawyer, Human Rights Activist
- Website: Tarek Hussein

Tarek Hussein is an Egyptian lawyer. He was born in 1993. He worked as a lawyer and a founding member of the Constitution Party and one of the party's young leaders.

== Early life ==
Hussein was born in 1993 in one of the villages in Qalyubia. He graduated from the Faculty of Law at Benha University in 2016. He joined the Egyptian Center for Economic and Social Rights as a human rights lawyer.

== Political activism ==
Hussein participated in the establishment of the Constitution Party (Egypt) in 2012 and was one of its founding members and held several positions within the party within his province in Qalyubiya until he assumed the position of Assistant Secretary of the Committee on Rights and Freedoms Party from 2015 until now and participated in the establishment of the popular campaign to support Khaled Ali President of Egypt 2014 until withdrawal Khalid Ali because of the political situation and the suppression of freedoms participated in the popular campaign to support Khalid Ali President of Egypt in 2018 until the withdrawal of Khaled Ali because of the closure of the public sphere and the arrest of presidential candidates

== The period of Mohamed Morsi ==
Participated in most of the peaceful demonstrations that were calling for the objectives of the January revolution until he was arrested in one of the demonstrations of the revolutionary forces in front of the Guidance Office in 2013 and a charge of demonstrations and rallies and an attempt to overthrow the regime and was evacuated after four days in custody pending investigations and was acquitted and appealed to the prosecution on the ruling The Court of Cassation revoked a three-year appeal court in absentia until it appealed against the verdict and again acquitted it in 2016

== Period of Transitional President Adly Mansour ==
Was arrested renewed in demonstrations of the revolutionary forces in Maadi in 2014 to demand the achievement of the objectives of the January revolution and condemn the violations and the dismantling of sit-ins in a brutal manner and the issuance of the law of protest and that time faced charges of demonstration and gathering and belonging to the Muslim Brotherhood and became Tarek in that period directed The Maadi Misdemeanor Court sentenced him to two years' imprisonment and two years until he was acquitted of a second-degree court after three years in prison for more than three months.

== Arrest and trial ==
President Abd al-Fattah al-Sisi signed the agreement on the demarcation of the maritime border with Saudi Arabia in 2016. He was arrested along with several activists after he ratified the parliament's approval of the agreement on charges of incitement to protest against the ratification of the Tiran and Sanafir Agreement. Of the Public Prosecution on bail of 2000 Egyptian pounds The Egyptian Interior Ministry then suspended the decision to vacate the case by claiming criminal cases against him. A group of activists set up an electronic petition on the Avaz website to demand that the Interior Ministry release him. Tarek sent several letters to the head of the lawyers' lawyer Sameh Ashour from inside his prison and after presenting The International Federation for Human Rights (FIDH) demanded that the Egyptian authorities release him and allow his lawyer to see him. The International Federation for Human Rights (FIDH)

== Release ==
On 27 July, after more than 42 days of arbitrary detention, the Ministry of the Interior released him from the Khanka police station and Amnesty International and the International Federation for Human Rights issued a statement welcoming his release. To interview him about the violations committed in Egyptian prisons, including the Guardian, where he conducted a dialogue with him torture in Egyptian prisons." and translated by BBC
