= Sabin Willett =

American lawyer (born 1957)

Peter Sabin Willett, known as Sabin Willett, (born March 6, 1957) is an American lawyer and novelist, a partner with the Philadelphia-based law firm Morgan, Lewis & Bockius, formerly a partner at Bingham McCutchen. He lives near Boston, Massachusetts. He is perhaps best known as a defense lawyer for several Uighur prisoners at the Guantanamo Bay detainment camp.

== Education ==
Willett was educated in England at Gresham's School, Holt, and at Harvard College and Harvard Law School.

- Gresham's School: graduated with three A-levels, 1975
- Harvard College: Bachelor of Arts magna cum laude, 1979
- Harvard Law School: Juris Doctor cum laude, 1983

== Novels by Sabin Willett ==
- The Deal (Random House, 1996) ISBN 0-679-44852-7
- The Betrayal (Villard, 1998) ISBN 0-425-17334-8
- Present Value (Random House, 2003) ISBN 0-8129-6955-3

== Articles by Sabin Willett ==
- Sabin Willett (September 27, 2006). "The Innocent Man at Guantanamo". International Herald Tribune.
- P. Sabin Willett (November 14, 2005). "Detainees Deserve Court Trials". Washington Post. pp. A21.
- Sabin Willett (December 3, 2007). "I will never leave Guantanamo". Boston Globe.
- Sabin Willett (November 30, 2008). "Judging detainees on the facts". Boston Globe. Archived from the original on December 4, 2008.

== Legal Publications by Sabin Willett ==
- Adel's Anniversary: A Guantanamo Tale , JURIST (University of Pittsburgh School of Law Journal), March 2006
- The Doctrine of Robin Hood: a Note on Substantive Consolidation (4 DePaul Business & Commercial Law Journal 87, Fall, 2005)
- The Shallows of Deepening Insolvency (60 The Business Lawyer 533, February, 2005)
- Bankruptcy Trial Tactics (ABA Judicial Division Bench/Bar Bankruptcy Conference, March, 2005)
- The Doctrine of Necessity: a Polemic (13 Journal of Bankruptcy Law and Practice no. 4 at 61, 2004)

== Lawyer ==
As a lawyer, Willett concentrates his practice in commercial and bankruptcy litigation.

He also represents a number of Uyghur captives in Guantanamo held by the United States at Guantanamo Bay detention camp as part of the war on terror. Five of the Uighurs, including two of Willett's clients, were determined not to be enemy combatants and released to Albania in 2006.

The United States Congress's passage of the Military Commissions Act of 2006 was intended to strip the Guantanamo captives of the right to access the US justice system, including writs of habeas corpus.

The Act was intended to close the approximately 200 outstanding writs of habeas corpus.

Willett turned to a provision of the Detainee Treatment Act of 2005, which set out rules through which captives could challenge the rulings of their Combatant Status Review Tribunals, to set in motion challenges which could result in the remaining Uyghurs also being rules as "no longer enemy combatants".

On June 12 of 2008 the United States Supreme Court ruled that the executive branch could not keep the Guantanamo captives from accessing the US Judicial system. In an unrelated development, on June 20, 2008, an appeals court in Washington considering Parhat v. Gates under the Detainee Treatment Act, overruled Uyghur captive Hassan Parhat's Combatant Status Review Tribunal's determination that he was an "enemy combatant", based a lack of evidence. Willett was one of Parhat's lawyers.

The Department of Justice decided not to appeal the Parhat v. Gates ruling.

In September 2008 the Bush administration abandoned the claim that any of the Uyghurs were "enemy combatants".

In June 2009 Willett and Susan Baker Manning accompanied four Uyghurs, including Hassan Parhat, to freedom in Bermuda. The Micronesian state of Palau announced it would accept the other thirteen Uyghurs, but there have been complications, and they remain at Guantanamo.

=== Memberships ===
- Boston Bar Association
- Massachusetts Bar Association
- New Hampshire Bar Association
- American Bar Association

== Sources ==
- P. Sabin Willett at Bingham McCutchen
- A Talk with Sabin Willett
