= Salih Uyar =

Turkish citizen detained at Guantanamo Bay

- Born: 1962 (age 63–64)
- Citizenship: Turkish
- Detained at: Guantanamo
- ISN: 298
- Charge: No charge (extrajudicial detention)
- Status: no longer enemy combatant, released

Salih Uyar (born 1962) is a citizen of Turkey who was held in extrajudicial detention in the United States Guantanamo Bay detention camp, in Cuba. Salih Uyar was repatriated on April 18, 2005.

== Casio watch ==
When the Department of Defense was forced to comply with US District Court Justice Jed Rakoff's court order to release the documents from the Guantanamo detainees's Combatant Status Review Tribunals Uyar's name came to light.'

One of the reasons he was detained was that he was captured wearing a Casio F91W digital watch.

Uyar asked his Tribunal: "If it's a crime to carry this watch, your own military personnel also carry this watch, too, Does that mean that they're just terrorists as well?"

On March 3, 2006, in response to a court order from Jed Rakoff the Department of Defense published a summarized transcript from his Combatant Status Review Tribunal.

== Press reports ==
On July 12, 2006 the magazine Mother Jones provided excerpts from the transcripts of a selection of the Guantanamo detainees. The article informed readers:

More than a dozen detainees were cited for owning cheap digital watches, particularly "the infamous Casio watch of the type used by Al Qaeda members for bomb detonators."

The article quoted Uyar, and three other watch owners:

If it is a crime to carry this watch, your own military personnel also carry this watch. Does this mean they're just terrorists as well?

== Determined not to have been an Enemy Combatant ==
According to The Washington Post Uyar was one of the detainees who was determined not to have been an "enemy combatant" after all. They report that Uyar has been released.
