= Adel Noori =

Uyghur refugee and former Guantanamo Bay detainee

- Born: November 12, 1979 (age 47); Xinjiang, China
- Known for: Chinese refugee held for seven years at the Guantanamo Bay detention camp

Adel Noori, is a Uyghur refugee who was wrongly imprisoned for more than 7 years in the Guantanamo Bay detention camps in Cuba. His Guantanamo Internment Serial Number was 584 Joint Task Force Guantanamo counter-terrorism analysts report that he was born on November 12, 1979, in Xinjiang, China.

Adel Noori is one of the 22 Uighurs held in Guantanamo for many years despite it becoming clear early on that they were innocent.

He won his habeas corpus in 2008. Judge Ricardo Urbina declared his detention as unlawful and ordered that he be set free in the United States.

== Combatant Status Review ==
Noori was among the 60% of prisoners who participated in the tribunal hearings. A Summary of Evidence memo was prepared for the tribunal of each detainee.

Noori's memo accused him of the following:

a. The detainee is a member of al Qaeda:
1. The detainee traveled to Afghanistan via Kyrgyzstan to receive training at an Uighur training camp/safe house in Kabul.
2. The detainee arrived in Kabul on 26 July 2001 to begin training.
3. The detainee received training on the AK-47 rifle and a Makarov pistol while at the Kabul Uighur training camp/safe house.
4. When the bombing began in Kabul, the detainee and all of the Uighurs ran in all directions for safety.
5. The detainee fled to Pakistan where he and three others were arrested by the Pakistani police while trying to evade detection (dressed in burkas).

== Transcript ==
Noori chose to participate in his Combatant Status Review Tribunal. On March 3, 2006, in response to a court order from Jed Rakoff, the Department of Defense published a single page Summarized transcript from his Combatant Status Review Tribunal.

== Mohammon v. Bush, Civil Action No. 05-2386 ==
Adel Noori was one of the petitioners in Mohammon v. Bush, Civil Action No. 05-2386.

In September 2007, the Department of Justice published dossiers of unclassified documents arising from the Combatant Status Review Tribunals of 179 captives. The Department of Defense withheld Adel Noori's documents when they published the documents from the other 179 habeas petitioner's CSR Tribunals.

On July 18, 2008, George M. Clarke III informed the US District Court that:

The government has refused to provide Petitioner Adel Noori's CSRT record to his counsel.

=== Administrative Review Board ===
Detainees whose Combatant Status Review Tribunal labeled them "enemy combatants" were scheduled for annual Administrative Review Board hearings. These hearings were designed to assess the threat a detainee might pose if released or transferred, and whether there were other factors that warranted his continued detention.

== Summary of Evidence memo ==
A Summary of Evidence memo was prepared for Adel Noori's Administrative Review Board, on July 1, 2005. The memo listed factors for and against his continued detention.

The following primary factors favor continued detention

a. Commitment
1. Detainee is an ethnic Uighur wanted by the communist Chinese government for involvement in an uprising that took place in Southern Xinjiang province in 1990.
2. Detainee went to Afghanistan to train and return to fight Chinese oppression of ethnic Uighurs.
3. The detainee arrived at a safe house in Kabul on July 26, 2001.
4. When bombing began in Kabul, Afghanistan, the detainee sought refuge in Sara, Afghanistan, and then traveled to Pakistan.
5. On January 15, 2002, the detainee and three other men, were arrested dressed in burkas (clothing worn by females), by Pakistani Police in Lahore, Pakistan.

b. Training

The detainee received training on an AK-47, a rifle, and a Makarov pistol at the safe house.

c. Connections/Associations
1. The detainee traveled to a Uighur safe house in Kabul, Afghanistan, to receive training.
2. The Emir of the safe house was Hassan Mahsum, the leader of the East Tajikistan Islamic Party.
3. The detainee said that he was attempting to join the Eastern Turkistan Islamic Movement (ETIM).
4. The Eastern Turkistan Islamic Movement (ETIM) is designated an Other Foreign Terrorist Organization by the United States Department of Homeland Security.
5. Hassan Mahsum visited the safe house a few days after detainee arrived at the safe house in August 2001, and again at the onset of the United States bombing campaign in October 2001.
6. Hassan Maksoon (ph) oversees the operation of a small school in Kabul, Afghanistan, where groups of three Uighurs train in Islam and light weapons operations.

d. Intent
1. Detainee was encouraged to go to Afghanistan where training is available for fighting the Chinese government.
2. Detainee advised that the purpose of the training was to return to his home and fight the Chinese.

e. Other Relevant Data
1. When the detainee was arrested by Pakistani authorities, he told them he was Uzbeki to avoid being turned over to Chinese authorities.
2. The three men arrested wearing burkas along with the detainee were Maneh and Ibrahim from Saudi Arabia, and Ibrahim from Morocco.
3. In 1990, detainee's friend Abdulhamid, was killed in an uprising known as the Baren War. The detainee had studied Martial Arts with Abdulhamid.
4. Detainee advised he was very good friends with Abdrahim Otkue, a famous Uighur author. Otkur was arrested by the Chinese during the Cultural Revolution and served time in a Chinese prison.
5. The detainee met an American, through his friend Abdurehum Oktur, whom he knew as Dr. David Alim, a Physics professor at Xinjiang University, that reportedly speaks Uighur.
6. The detainee stated he knew Nurmamet Kenji, Chairman of a Bishkek committee known as "The Uighur Union".

The following primary factors favor release or transfer

a. Upon release the detainee said he would like to be part of the action to defend the Uighur people and fight for human rights.

b. Detainee said he had no negative feelings toward the United States. He was never asked to participate in Jihad against the United States while in Afghanistan. He said he would submit to a polygraph examination.

c. Detainee stated he would not fight against the United States even if his religion told him to.

d. Detainee acknowledges that if he returns to China he will face execution. He is very fearful that information about him will be passed to the Chinese government. He requests asylum in the United States.

e. Detainee denied having any knowledge of the attacks in the United States prior to their execution on September 11, and also denied knowledge of any rumors of plans of future attacks on the United States or United States interests.

== Board recommendations ==
In early September 2007, the Department of Defense released two heavily redacted memos, from his Board, to Gordon R. England, the Designated Civilian Official. The Board's recommendation was unanimous The Board's recommendation was redacted. England authorized his transfer on October 22, 2005.

== 2005 through 2008 ==
On June 12, 2008, the United States Supreme Court restored the Guantanamo captives' access to the USA's civilian justice system in its ruling on Boumediene v. Bush. Specifically it re-initiated the captives' habeas corpus petitions. In an unrelated development Huzaifa Parhat's DTA appeal concluded that his Combatant Status Review Tribunal had erred in confirming he was an "enemy combatant", due to insufficient evidence. The Department of Justice had the option of appealing the ruling, claiming it had new evidence. The Uyghurs' habeas petitions were the first to be scheduled for review. In September 2008, days before the Department of Justice would have been expected to offer a justification in court for the Uyghurs' detention, and after six and half years of extrajudicial detention, the Department of Justice acknowledged the evidence to justify their detention did not exist.

== Temporary Asylum in Palau ==
In June 2009 the government of Palau announced that they would offer temporary asylum to some of the Uyghurs. The government of Palau sent a delegation to Guantanamo, and interviewed some of the remaining Uyghurs. Some of the Uyghurs declined to be interviewed by the Palauans. In the end the government of Palau offered asylum to twelve of the remaining thirteen Uyghurs. Palau declined to offer asylum to one of the Uyghurs who suffered from a mental disorder, brought on by detention, that was too profound to be treated in Palau.

On October 31, 2009, Adel Noori, Ahmad Tourson, Abdul Ghappar Abdul Rahman, Edham Mamet, Anwar Hassan, and Dawut Abdurehim were released and transferred to Palau.

Noori worked as a security guard at the Palau Community College.

== Reappearance in Turkey ==
On February 14, 2013, the Associated Press reported that Noori had been "missing since late last year" from Palau. The Uyghurs were not eligible for Palauan citizenship, so Noori had no legitimate travel documents. The Associated Press quoted a report from Tia Belau, a local newspaper, that speculated Noori may have been trying to make his way to Turkey, to join his wife and child.

The Tia Belau reported that Noori had not been seen at work for two months. They reported he had traveled through Japan, but Japanese officials could not refute or confirm this.

Carol Rosenberg, of the McClatchy News Services, confirmed on February 20, 2013, that US officials knew Noori had joined his wife in Turkey, though the officials she spoke with insisted on anonymity. Joshua Keating of Foreign Policy magazine noted that "Noori's relocation is particularly impressive given that he is technically stateless and has no travel documents."

On June 29, 2015, Nathan Vanderklippe, reporting in The Globe and Mail, wrote that all the Uyghurs had quietly left Palau. The Globe confirmed that Palau's agreement to give refuge to the Uyghurs was reached after the USA agreed to various secret payments. Those payments included $93,333 to cover each Uyghurs living expenses. The Globe confirmed that controversy still surrounded former President Johnson Toribiong who had used some of those funds to billet the Uyghurs in houses belonging to his relatives.

Vanderklippe reported that the men had never felt they could fit in with the Palauans. Some of the men compared Palau with a lusher, larger Guantanamo. Some of the men were able to bring their wives to Palau. Attempts to hold most regular jobs failed, due to cultural differences. Attempts to use their traditional leather-working skills to be self-employed failed. Eventually, all six men were employed as night-time security guards, a job that did not require interaction with Palauans.

One of the men's young toddler, born on Palau, died when he fell from a balcony. According to Vanderklippe, the men's departure from Palau was quietly arranged with the cooperation of American officials. He reported they left, one or two at a time, on commercial flights. Palauan officials would not share the Uyghurs' destinations.
