= Ahmed Adil =

Uyghur refugee and former Guantanamo Bay detainee

- Born: 1973 (age 52–53); Kashgar, Xinjiang, China
- Detained at: Guantanamo
- ISN: 260
- Charge: No charge (held in extrajudicial detention)
- Status: Transferred to a refugee camp in Albania

Ahmed Adil (born 1973) is a Chinese citizen of Uyghur ethnicity who was held in extrajudicial detention in the United States Guantanamo Bay detainment camps in Cuba.

== Detention ==
Adil was assigned Guantanamo Internment Serial Number 260. U.S. intelligence analysts estimate he was born in 1973 in Kashgar, Xinjiang, China.

Adil is among roughly two dozen detainees from the Uyghur ethnic group. A Combatant Status Review Tribunal determined he was not an enemy combatant after all. Five of the Uyghurs were transferred to Albania, while others underwent new Tribunals that reversed earlier findings.

== Alleged affiliation with Eastern Turkistan Islamic Movement ==
According to security officials, Adil was one of approximately two dozen Uyghur captives accused of membership in the Eastern Turkistan Islamic Movement, an organization that the Chinese government classifies as both terrorist and secessionist.

Documents released in response to the writ of habeas corpus Hassan Anvar v. George W. Bush contained a December 30, 2004 memo which provided one-paragraph information of 22 Uyghur detainees, all of which faced allegations from Joint Task Force Guantanamo intelligence officials of having received training at an "ETIM training camp".

The information about Ahmed Adil stated:

Ahmed Adil is a 31-year-old Chinese Citizen who is an ethnic Uighur from the Xinjiang province of China. Adil was last interviewed in the end of 2002. He has no reported incidents of violence in his discipline history. Adil is suspected as [sic] being a probable member of the East Turkistan Islamic Movement (ETIM). He is suspected of having received training in an ETIM training camp in Afghanistan.

The information paper also identified him as "Ahnad Adil".

== Combatant Status Review ==
The Bush administration asserted that:

the protections of the Geneva Conventions did not extend to captured prisoners who are not members of the regular Afghan armed force nor meet the criteria for prisoner of war for voluntary forces.

Critics argued the Conventions obliged the U.S. to conduct competent tribunals to determine the status of prisoners. Subsequently, the U.S. Department of Defense instituted Combatant Status Review Tribunals (CSRTs), to determine whether detainees met the new definition of an "enemy combatant".

"Enemy combatant" was defined by the U.S. Department of Defense as:

an individual who was part of, or supporting, the Taliban, or al-Qaeda forces, or associated forces that are engaged in hostilities against the United States or its coalition partners. This includes any person who commits a belligerent act or has directly supported hostilities in aid of enemy armed forces.

The CSRTs are not bound by the rules of evidence that would normally apply in civilian court, and the government’s evidence is presumed to be "genuine and accurate." From July 2004 through March 2005, CSRTs were convened to determine whether each prisoner had been correctly classified as an "enemy combatant".

Ahmed Adil was among the 60% of prisoners who chose to participate in tribunal hearings. A Summary of Evidence memo was prepared for the tribunal of each detainee, listing the allegations that supported their detention as an "enemy combatant".

Ahmed Adil's memo accused him of the following:

The detainee supported the Taliban against the United States and its coalition partners:
1. The detainee traveled to Jalalabad, Afghanistan from Pakistan in 2001.
2. The detainee went to Afghanistan in October 2001 to receive training.
3. The detainee traveled from Jalalabad to a Uighur camp in the Tora Bora mountains and stayed there for approximately forty-five days.
4. Uighur groups in China’s Xinjiang Uighur Autonomous Region (XUAR) have formed ties with Al Qaeda and other Islamic terrorist groups and China’s two principal militant Uighur groups are the East Turkistan Islamic Movement (ETIM) and the East Turkistan Liberation Organization (ETLO).
5. The East Turkistan Islamic Movement is listed in the U.S. Department of Homeland Security Terrorist Organization Reference Guide, as being one of the most militant groups, and has financial and training ties to Al Qaeda.
6. While in the Tora Bora Mountains, the detainee learned how to "break down" the Kalashniko.
7. The detainee was in the Tora Bora mountains when the U.S. bombing campaign occurred.
8. Pakistani soldiers, while fleeing Afghanistan into Pakistan, captured the detainee, along with other Uighurs and Arabs.

On March 3, 2006, in response to a court order from Jed Rakoff the Department of Defense published a six page summarized transcript from his Combatant Status Review Tribunal.

== Letter to the Secretary of State ==
Adil wrote to Secretary of State Condoleezza Rice on January 19, 2006. In his letter, and he noted that his Tribunal determined he was innocent on May 9, 2005. He said he was appealing directly to Rice because he had tried all other options.

== Asylum in Albania ==
On May 5, 2006, the Department of Defense announced that they had transferred five Uyghurs, who had been determined not to have been enemy combatants, to Albania. Seventeen other Uyghurs continue to be held at Guantanamo because their CSRTs decided they were enemy combatants.

== The McClatchy interview ==
On June 15, 2008, the McClatchy News Service published articles based on interviews with 66 former Guantanamo captives. McClatchy reporters interviewed Ahmed Adil. During his interview Ahmed Adil described life in the Uyghur construction camp:

It was a simple life, but there was food and shelter and company. I'd only been there 45 days when the bombing started. At first, I wasn't worried because it had nothing to do with me. But then it did. The bombs got close.

Ahmed Adil told his interviewers that he spent long periods in solitary confinement, in a cell that was only 3 x 6 feet, and that he was always chained to the floor during his interrogations.
