= Qassim v. Bush =

Abu Bakker Qassim, et al. v. George W. Bush, et al. (05-5477)
- Court: United States District Court for the District of Columbia
- Decided: December 22, 2005
- Citation: Not specified

Case history
- Subsequent actions: As of July 18, 2008, Mr. Qassim continues to live in Albania, while Mr. Hakim resides in Sweden.

Court membership
- Judge sitting: District Court Judge Thomas F. Hogan

Case opinions
- The case raised issues related to the detention of Uyghur detainees at Guantanamo Bay and their petitions for habeas corpus. The case was dismissed as moot after the petitioners were released to Albania.

Abu Bakker Qassim, et al. v. George W. Bush, et al. (05-5477), is a case in which two Muslim Uyghurs challenged their detention at the Guantanamo Bay Naval Base in Cuba.

== Facts ==
In late 2001, Abu Bakker Qassim and A'Del Abdu Al-Hakim were both captured and transferred to United States custody in Afghanistan, where they were later held at "Camp Delta" on the Guantanamo Bay Naval Base as enemy combatants. In 2005, the Combatant Status Review Tribunal (CSRT) determined them to be "no longer enemy combatants" (NLECs). They are currently in legal limbo as they refuse to go back to their native China for fear of torture and the United States refuses to admit them into the country.

== Court decisions ==
They petitioned the United States District Court for the District of Columbia for a writ of habeas corpus which was later denied on December 22, 2005. The District Court found that the federal courts have "no relief to offer." On January 17, 2006, while on appeal to the United States Court of Appeals for the District of Columbia Circuit, Qassim and al-Hakim petitioned the Supreme Court of the United States for a writ of certiorari, which was denied without explanation on April 17, 2006. Their case was scheduled for oral argument on May 8, 2006.

The United States released the petitioners to Albania on May 5, 2006, three days before oral argument was to begin in the Court of Appeals. On an emergency motion filed later that day by the United States, the case was dismissed as moot. Barbara Olshansky, one of the Uighur's lawyers, characterized the sudden transfer as an attempt to: "...avoid having to answer in court for keeping innocent men in jail".

== Eligible to seek relief ==
On July 3, 2008, US District Court Judge Thomas F. Hogan listed this habeas petition on a list where former captives were eligible to seek relief.

== Current status ==
As of July 18, 2008, Mr. Qassim continues to live in Albania where he has difficulty attempting to have a new life without his friends and family. Mr. Hakim now resides in Sweden with his sister and her family. His application for asylum was denied and is on appeal.

== See also ==
- Rasul v. Bush (2004)
- Hamdan v. Rumsfeld (2006)
- Abu Bakker Qassim
- A'Del Abdu Al-Hakim
- Uyghur detainees in Guantanamo
