= Ibrahim Fauzee =

Maldivian detainee at Guantanamo Bay (born 1978)

- Born: 11 November 1978 (age 48); Thulhaadhoo, Baa Atoll, Maldives
- Arrested: 19 May 2001; Karachi, Green Town, Pakistan
- Released: 11 March 2004
- Citizenship: Maldivian citizenship
- Detained at: Guantanamo
- ISN: 730
- Charge: No charge (extrajudicial detention)

Ibrahim Fauzee is a citizen of the Maldives, who was held in extrajudicial detention in the United States's Guantanamo Bay detention camps, in Cuba.

His Guantanamo Internment Serial Number was 730. Intelligence analysts estimate he was born on 11 November 1978, in Thulhaadhoo in Baa Atoll, Maldives.

== Combatant Status Review Tribunal ==
Initially, the George W Bush administration asserted that they could withhold all the protections of the Geneva Conventions to captives from the war on terror.

This policy was challenged before the judicial branch. Critics argued that the US could not evade its obligation to conduct competent tribunals to determine whether captives are, or are not, entitled to the protections of prisoner of war status.

Subsequently, the Department of Defense instituted the Combatant Status Review Tribunals. These tribunals, however, were not authorised to determine whether the captives were "lawful combatants" – rather, they were merely empowered to make a recommendation as to whether the captive had previously been correctly determined to match the Bush administration's definition of an enemy combatant.

=== Summary of Evidence memo ===
A Summary of Evidence memo was prepared for Ibrahim Fauzee's Combatant Status Review Tribunal, on 13 December 2004. The memo listed the following allegations against him:

A. The detainee is associated with al Qaida and/or the Taliban:
1. The detainee was arrested in Pakistan while he was living in a suspected al Qaida safehouse.
2. The detainee's point of contact telephone number was found in other terrorist detainee's pocket litter.
3. The detainee's point of contact telephone number was associated with a Sudanese teacher who assisted Arabs traveling to training camps in Afghanistan.

=== Transcript ===
There is no record that Ibrahim Fauzee participated in his Combatant Status Review Tribunal.

== Determined not to have been an enemy combatant ==
The Washington Post reported that Fauzee was one of 38 detainees who was determined not to have been an enemy combatant during his Combatant Status Review Tribunal. The Post also reported that Fauzee was released. The Department of Defense refers to these men as "no longer enemy combatants".

== Public statements ==
Pakistan's Daily Times reported that Ibrahim Fauzee spoke out for the first time following his 2005 release, on 31 October 2008.

The Times attributed Fauzee's comments to the electoral defeat of the Maldives leader Maumoon Abdul Gayoom. He attributed his detention to Gayoom.

Fauzee said that the Americans had allowed him to be interrogated by Maldives security officials. He said Maldives officials had interrogated him about whether he planned to challenge Gayoom. He blamed Gayoom's regime for not trying to secure his release earlier. He said Maldivian security officials had kept him under surveillance.

== Public appearance ==
Breaking his silence on 11 November 2008, after the change of the government, Fauzee founded a religious organisation, Islamic Foundation of the Maldives, on 26 April 2009, in the capital city of the Maldives, Malé. He is the founder and the current president of the organisation. The religious gatherings of Islamic Foundation attracted thousands of supporters, making it one of the leading organisations operating in the country.

He openly criticised the religious policies of the country, including when the English reporting website Minivan News published a letter calling for gay rights. His continuous attempts forced the Ministry of Islamic Affairs to probe the matter.
