= Khalil Mamut =

Uyghur refugee and former Guantanamo Bay detainee

- Born: 1977 (age 48–49); Kashgar, Xinjiang, China
- Detained at: Guantanamo
- Other names: Khaleel Mamut; Abdul Nasser; Abdul Helil Mamut
- ISN: 278
- Charge: No charge
- Status: Released

Khalil Mamut is a Uyghur refugee with British nationality, imprisoned for seven years at the United States Guantanamo Bay detention camps, in Cuba.

The US Department of Defense estimated that Mamut was born in Kashgar, Xinjiang, China, in 1977 and assigned him the Guantanamo Internment Serial Number 278.

Mamut is one of the 22 Uighurs held in Guantanamo for many years despite it becoming clear early on that they were innocent.

He won his habeas corpus in 2008. Judge Ricardo Urbina declared his detention as unlawful and ordered to set him free in the United States. He was sent to Bermuda in June 2009.

== Sent to Bermuda ==
Abdul Helil Mamut, and three other Uyghurs Huzaifa Parhat, Emam Abdulahat and Jalal Jalaladin were set free in Bermuda on June 11, 2009.

In August 2018, Mamut and his family (along with several others) were granted British Overseas Territories Citizenship, though not Bermudian status. This gave him the right to permanently reside in Bermuda, though not to vote.
