= Mohammed Ayub =

Uyghur refugee and former Guantanamo Bay detainee

Haji Mohammed Ayub
- Born: April 15, 1984 (age 42); Toqquztash, China
- Detained at: Guantanamo
- Other name: Ayoob Haji Mohammed
- ISN: 279
- Status: Determined not to have been an enemy combatant after all

Haji Mohammed Ayub (born April 15, 1984) is a citizen of China, who was held in extrajudicial detention in the United States Guantanamo Bay detention camps, in Cuba. The Department of Defense reports he was born on April 15, 1984, in Toqquztash, China.

Ayub is one of approximately two dozen detainees from the Uyghur ethnic group.

Ayub was one of the five Uyghurs whose Combatant Status Review Tribunal determined that he was not an enemy combatant and was transferred to an Albanian refugee camp.

== McClatchy interview ==
On June 15, 2008, the McClatchy News Service published articles based on interviews with 66 former Guantanamo captives. McClatchy reporters interviewed Mohammed Ayub. Mohammed Ayub told interviewers he found the conditions in Guantanamo so harsh that he dropped from 164 to 105 pounds, and that he was so hungry he was reduced to eating orange peels. He told interviewers captives were punished harshly for small infractions, like having an extra napkin.

In spite of his treatment in Guantanamo Mohammed Ayub told reporters he would still like to move to the USA. He has relatives who live in America, and in 2001 he had a student visa for the USA. However, a friend he was traveling with did not, and he decided to postpone his travel until his friend had a visa, too.

Mohammed Ayub described the interrogations the captives went through when Chinese security officials visited Guantanamo as:

...nothing more than threats. They told me they knew my family, where I'd lived, when I'd left China, where I'd traveled. I would be imprisoned if I ever tried to return to China. It was frightening, they got to us inside that place.

Mohammed Ayub said that he and his companion decided to wait for the visa in Afghanistan, where he was mugged, lost his money and identity papers.

== See also ==
- Minors detained in the War on Terror
- Uyghur detainees at Guantanamo Bay
