= Uyghur detainees at Guantanamo Bay =

Starting in 2002, the American government detained 22 Uyghurs in the Guantanamo Bay detainment camp. The last 3 Uyghur detainees, Yusef Abbas, Hajiakbar Abdulghupur and Saidullah Khali, were released from Guantanamo on December 29, 2013, and later transferred to Slovakia.

Uyghurs are an ethnic group from Central Asia, native to the Xinjiang Uyghur Autonomous Region in Western China. Since the People's Republic of China gained control of Xinjiang in 1949, Uyghurs have led a series of rebellions and uprisings against the Chinese, gaining intense coverage in the 90s and early 2000s, culminating in a series of protests, demonstrations, and terrorist attacks. Uyghurs have also frequently called for the international recognition of their own state through the East Turkestan Islamic Movement, which the United States used to recognize as a terrorist group.

The Washington Post reported on August 24, 2005, that fifteen Uyghurs had been determined to be "No longer enemy combatants" (NLECs). The Post reported that detainees who had been classified as NLEC were, not only still being incarcerated, but one was shackled to the floor for reasons not disclosed by his attorney. Five of these Uyghurs, who had filed for writs of habeas corpus, were transported to Albania on May 5, 2006, just prior to a scheduled judicial review of their petitions. The other seventeen obtained writs of habeas corpus in 2008.

== Common elements in the detainees' testimony ==
Several of the detainees admitted receiving training on the AK-47, including Bahtiyar Mahnut, Yusef Abbas, and Abdul Hehim. They described being trained by East Turkestan Islamic Movement leaders Abdul Haq and Hassan Maksum. At least one described being trained on a pistol.

The Uyghurs who were present at the alleged camp reported that they did not expect their camp to be bombed. Some of them acknowledged that they had heard of the September 11 attacks on the radio, but none of them knew that the Taliban were accused of involvement. They all acknowledged having fled the camp when it was bombed. They all stated that they were unarmed. One of the Uyghurs said Maksum was killed in the bombing.

None of the Uyghurs described seeing the United States as an enemy. All of the Uyghurs mentioned the People's Republic of China and described its government as an oppressive occupation. Some of the Uyghurs said that they sought out the training in order to go back to China and defend their fellow Uyghurs against their Chinese occupiers. Some of the other Uyghurs said they sought out the camp of fellow Uyghurs because they were waiting for a visa to Iran, one of the countries they had to pass through on their way to Turkey. They had heard that Turkey would grant them political asylum.

== Combatant Status Review Tribunal results ==
From July 2004 through March 2005, all 568 of the detainees held at Guantanamo had their detention reviewed by Combatant Status Review Tribunals. 38 of the detainees were determined to be NLEC. Five Uyghurs were among the 38 detainees determined not to have been enemy combatants, and were transferred from the main detention camp to Camp Iguana.

This conclusion was remarked on by the first Denbeaux study, that pointed out that many of the detainees who remained incarcerated had faced much less serious allegations than the Uyghurs had faced.

On May 10, 2006, Radio Free Asia reported that the five Uyghurs transported to Albania were the only Uyghurs who had been moved to Camp Iguana.

In September 2007, the Department of Defense published dossiers prepared from the unclassified documents arising from the captives' Combatant Status Review Tribunals. Information paper: Uighur Detainee Population at JTF-GTMO

An article about the Uyghurs' appeal, in The Jurist, citing the Fifth Denbeaux Report: The no-hearing hearings, called the Uighur's Combatant Status Review Tribunals "show trials". In April 2007, Sabin Willett, a lawyer for the Uyghurs, described their situation as:

No country will take them because either they've read all the newspapers printing claims by U.S. authorities that Guantanamo is a place where the worst of the worst are being held, and they believe that it's true, or, these countries say, 'Well if these guys are innocent, then why don't you, the United States, take them? Why won't you take them if they're not bad guys?' And the U.S. doesn't really have a good answer for that.

— Sabin Willett

== Asylum in Albania ==
None of the Uyghurs wanted to be returned to China. The United States declined to grant the Uyghurs political asylum, or to allow them parole, or even freedom on the naval base.

Some of the Uyghurs had lawyers who volunteered to help them pursue a writ of habeas corpus, which would have been one step in getting them freed from U.S. detention.

In the case of Qassim v. Bush, those Uyghurs argued for their writ of habeas corpus in United States Court of Appeals for the District of Columbia Circuit was scheduled to hear arguments on Monday May 8, 2006. Five of the Uyghurs were transported to Albania, on Friday May 5, 2006; the United States officials filed an emergency motion to dismiss later that day. The court dismissed the case as moot.

Barbara Olshansky, one of the Uyghur's lawyers, characterized the sudden transfer as an attempt to: "... avoid having to answer in court for keeping innocent men in jail,"

Some press reports state that the Uyghurs have been granted political asylum in Albania. But the U.S. government press release merely states that they are applying for asylum in Albania.

On May 9, 2006, the Associated Press reported that the People's Republic of China (PRC) denounced the transfer of custody. The PRC called the transfer of the Uyghurs to Albania a violation of international law. Albania agreed to examine the evidence against the men.

Radio Free Asia reports that the five were staying at a National Center for Refugees in a Tirana suburb.

On May 24, 2006, Abu Bakr Qasim told interviewers that he and his compatriots felt isolated in Albania. Qasim described his disappointment with the United States, who the Uyghurs had been hoping would support the Uyghurs quest for Uyghur autonomy. To the BBC he said that "Guantanamo was a five-year nightmare. We're trying to forget it".

In an interview with ABC News Qasim said that members of the American-Uyghur community had come forward and assured the U.S. government that they would help him and his compatriots adapt to life in the United States, if they were given asylum there.

On June 19, 2008, the Associated Press reported that Adel Abdu Al-Hakim had been denied political asylum in Sweden. Sten De Geer, his Swedish lawyer, plans to appeal the ruling, because Albania will not allow his wife and children to join him.

On February 9, 2009, Reuters reported that the five Uyghurs in Albania had heard from the seventeen Uyghurs left behind in Guantanamo, and that their conditions had improved.

== Allegations of collusion with the Chinese government ==
An article in the December 5, 2006, edition of The Washington Post reported on a legal appeal launched on behalf of seven of the Uyghurs who remained in detention in Guantanamo. According to their lawyers, the evidence against them were essentially identical to that against the five Uyghurs who were released and that the process by which their "enemy combatant" status had been determined and reviewed was flawed. The article went on to quote current and former officials in Washington who said the group that the Uyghurs were accused of belonging to had been was added to the State Department's list of Terrorist organizations in return for securing approval from the PRC to the then imminent U.S. invasion of Iraq. In response to the appeal, Guantanamo spokesman, Commander Jeffrey Gordon said: "There is a significant amount of evidence, both unclassified and classified, which supports detention by U.S. forces," According to the Associated Press Gordon told reporters that "the seven had 'multiple' reviews and were properly classified as enemy combatants."

A May 2008 report by the Inspector General of the United States Department of Justice claimed that American military interrogators appeared to have collaborated with visiting Chinese officials at Guantánamo Bay to enact sleep deprivation of the Uyghur detainees. A bipartisan Senate Armed Services Committee report, released in part in December 2008 and in full in April 2009, concluded that the legal authorization of enhanced interrogation techniques led directly to the abuse and killings of prisoners in US military facilities. Brutal prisoner abuse practices which were believed to have originated in Chinese torture techniques to extract false confessions from American POWs migrated from Guantanamo Bay to Afghanistan, then to Iraq and Abu Ghraib.

== Confinement in Camp Six ==
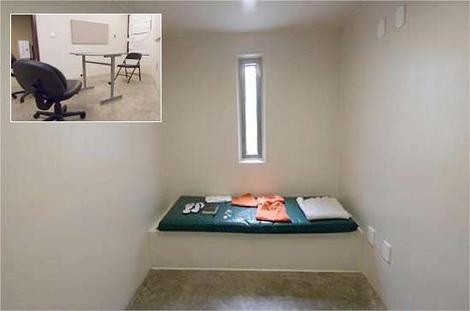
This is said to be David Hicks's cell, in Camp Six. The windows looks down on central common rooms, which are left vacant, as a change in policy, to turn the facility in a "supermax" facility, made common rooms redundant. The inset picture is of a "reading room". Captives are, occasionally taken to these "reading rooms", during their one-hour per day they are taken from their cell. However, they remain in isolation. Only one captive at a time is allowed in each reading room or exercise yard.

On March 11, 2007, the Boston Globe reported that the 17 remaining Uyghur captives had been transferred to the newly built Camp Six, in Guantanamo. The Globe reports that the Uyghurs are held for 22 hours a day in cells without natural light.

The Globe points out that prior to their detention in Camp Six, they were able to socialize with one another, but that they couldn't speak to the prisoners in neighboring cells because none of them speak Arabic or Pashto. The Globe quotes Sabin Willett, the Uyghur's lawyer, who reports that, consequently, there has been a serious decline in the Uyghur's mental health.

According to the Globe: "The military says the Uighurs were put there either because they attacked guards or trashed their quarters during the riot last May."

The Globe quotes Sabin Willett's explanation for the Uyghur's new harsher detention. Willett: "... links their assignment to Camp Six to a filing he made seeking their release."

== Passage of the Military Commissions Act and the Detainee Treatment Act ==
In the Summer of 2006, the habeas corpus submissions known as Hamdan v. Rumsfeld reached the United States Supreme Court. The Supreme Court ruled the Executive Branch lacked the Constitutional authority to initiate military commissions to try Guantanamo captives. However, it also ruled that the United States Congress did have the authority to set up military commissions. In the fall of 2006, Congress passed the Military Commissions Act, setting up military commissions similar to those initially set up by the Executive Branch.

The Act also stripped captives of the right to file habeas corpus submissions in the US Court system. The earlier Detainee Treatment Act, passed on December 31, 2005, had stripped captives of the right to initiate new habeas corpus submissions, while leaving existing habeas corpus motions in progress.

The Detainee Treatment Act had explicitly authorized an appeal process for Combatant Status Review Tribunals which failed to follow the military's own rules. And Sabin Willet, the Uyghur's lawyer, has chosen to initiate appeals of the Uyghur's Combatant Status Review Tribunals.

Each Uighurs' CSRT was inconsistent with the standards and procedures specified by the Secretary of Defense, because none appropriately applied the definition of 'Enemy Combatant'. The CSRT Procedures defined an 'enemy combatant' as: 'an individual who was part of or supporting the Taliban or al-Qaida forces, or associated forces that are engaged in hostilities against the United States or its coalition partners.'

However, Willet argues, the Combatant Status Review Tribunals failed to consider the interrogator's conclusions that the Uyghurs were not enemies, had not supported the Taliban, and had not engaged in hostilities.

Assistant Attorney General Peter D. Keisler led the response team. Keisler's team accused Willet of trying to:

... recreate the habeas regime that Congress recently abolished.

They said the argument boiled down to:

[Should] detainees captured on a battlefield during a time of war, be given unprecedented access to our nations courts and to classified information, even after Congress emphatically rejected such an approach?

== Asylum negotiations ==
The Uyghurs can not be repatriated to China because domestic U.S. law proscribes deporting individuals to countries where they are likely to be abused.

The Bush administration conducted bilateral negotiations with a number of other countries, to accept captives who had been cleared for release, with very limited success. Frustrated British officials who were negotiating for the return of Guantanamo captives who had been granted UK residency permission prior to their capture leaked the conditions Bush administration officials were trying to insist upon. Bush officials were insisting that Britain either indefinitely incarcerate the men, upon their arrival—or they place them under round the clock surveillance.

=== Early release discussions ===
The Asia Times reported, on November 4, 2004, that there had been internal discussion over how the US could release Uyghurs, without putting their safety at risk.

=== Asylum in Canada ===
On June 2, 2008, The Globe and Mail reported that recently released documents suggested that the Government of Canada had come close to offering asylum to the Uyghurs. The Globe reports that Canadian officials held back from offering the Uyghur captives asylum out of fear that the PRC government would retaliate against Huseyin Celil, a Canadian citizen of Uyghur background, who was in Chinese custody.

On February 4, 2009, The Globe and Mail reported that Hassan Anvar's refugee claim, and the refugee claims of two of his compatriots were close to completion. The article quoted Mehmet Tohti, a Uyghur human rights activist who stated that he had met with Immigration Minister Jason Kenney. According to the Globe, Tohti claimed there had been a positive consensus to admit Anvar, and two men whose lawyers haven't authorized their names to be released. According to the Canwest News Service, Kenney is considering issuing special ministerial permits for the three Uyghurs. According to Reuters, Alyshan Velshi, from Kenney's office, disputed whether Canada was close to accepting any Uyghurs. The other fourteen Uyghurs hadn't yet satisfied an obligation Canada expects of refugee claimants—that they establish their identity.

The Don Valley Refugee Resettlement Organization is sponsoring Hassan Anvar's refugee claim. The archdiocese of Montreal is sponsoring the other two men. Their sponsors will support the men with housing and clothing, if they are admitted.

=== Role of American Uyghurs ===
An article published by the Associated Press on October 10, 2008, quoted Elshat Hassan and Nury Turkel, two leaders of the Uyghur American Association, about plans for American-Uyghurs to help the Uyghur detainees acclimatize, once they have been admitted to the USA. Court records included a detailed plan by the UAA to assist Uyghur detainees in resettling in the United States.

=== Asylum in Munich ===
In February 2009, the Munich city council passed a motion to invite the remaining seventeen Uyghurs to settle in Munich, home to the largest community of Uyghurs outside of China.

=== Temporary asylum in Palau ===
In June 2009, Palauan President Johnson Toribiong agreed to "temporarily resettle" up to seventeen of the Uyghur detainees, at the United States' request.

On September 10, 2009, The Times reported that three of the Uyghurs, Dawut Abdurehim and Anwar Assan, and another man whose identity has not been made public, have accepted the invitation to be transferred to asylum in Palau.

On September 19, 2009, Fox News reported that in the week since the first announcement three further Uyghurs agreed to be transferred to Palau. Fox reported that five of the other Uyghurs had refused to speak with Palau officials.

On October 31, 2009, Ahmad Tourson, Abdul Ghappar Abdul Rahman, Edham Mamet, Anwar Hassan, Dawut Abdurehim and Adel Noori were reported to have been transferred to Palau.

On June 29, 2015, Nathan Vanderklippe, reporting in The Globe and Mail, wrote that all the Uyghurs had quietly left Palau. The Globe confirmed that Palau's agreement to give refuge to the Uyghurs was reached after the USA agreed to various secret payments. Those payments included $93,333 to cover each Uyghurs living expenses. The Globe confirmed that controversy still surrounded former President Johnson Toribiong who had used some of those funds to billet the Uyghurs in houses belonging to his relatives.

Vanderklippe reported that the men had never felt they could fit in with the Palauans. Some of the men compared Palau with a lusher, larger Guantanamo. Some of the men were able to bring their wives to Palau. Attempts to hold most regular jobs failed, due to cultural differences. Attempts to use their traditional leather-working skills to be self-employed failed. Eventually, all six men were employed as night-time security guards, a job that did not require interaction with Palauans.

Tragically, one of the men's young toddler, conceived and born on Palau, died after he fell off a balcony. According to Vanderklippe, the men's departure from Palau was quietly arranged with cooperation with American officials. He reported they left, one or two at a time, on commercial flights. Palauan officials would not share the Uyghurs destination.

In September 2018, some Indian newspapers reported that a suspected militant had been radicalized when he lived in Palau. The Australian Broadcasting Corporation considered the credibility of this claim, noting that the Indian man's five years in Palau overlapped with the Uyghurs.

=== Bermuda ===
On June 11, 2009, Abdul Helil Mamut, Huzaifa Parhat, Emam Abdulahat and Jalal Jalaladin arrived in the British overseas territory of Bermuda. The cost of the relocation will be borne by the United States, while the government of Bermuda would arrange documentation, residence and housing.

According to their lawyers, the four men will be "guest workers" in Bermuda; according to Premier of Bermuda Ewart Brown, they will be given the opportunity to become naturalised "citizens" — currently impossible under Bermudian law, and a right which many residents, locally born and raised, do not have — with the ability to eventually travel freely. The decision was made without the knowledge of Richard Gozney, the Governor of Bermuda, responsible for foreign affairs and security matters, who only found out after their arrival. Brown's promise of "citizenship" was apparently made without the knowledge of the British government, whose citizenship is being offered. The offer of asylum was strongly criticised both within Bermuda and by the UK. This was not the first time that Bermuda hosted refugees; during the 1970s, five people from Vietnam were allowed into the country; only one remains there, following the emigration of three others and the death of the fifth. The following day, the Opposition United Bermuda Party moved for a motion of no confidence against Brown, while the British government declared its intentions to review its legal relationship with the territory.

On September 29, 2011, the Antigua Observer quoted Henry Bellingham the United Kingdom's Overseas Territories Minister on the UK's expectation that the US would find a permanent home for the four Uyghurs in another country.

This is something that we weren't consulted on by the last (Brown) administration. We have spoken to the United States about it — it's our understanding that the arrangement was not to be permanent and we're looking to the US State Department to find a permanent solution. We're working with them to try and achieve that.

=== El Salvador ===
On April 19, 2012, the Associated Press reported that Abdul Razakah and Hammad Memet had been transferred to El Salvador. Ben Fox, writing for the Associated Press wrote that the men had already begun to learn Spanish. El Salvador officials said the men had been given refuge because many El Salvador citizens had been allowed refuge in other countries when their country was hit by civil war.

In September 2013, El Salvador reported that both men quietly slipped out of El Salvador, and that their destination was unknown but presumed to be Turkey.

== Slovakia ==
On December 27, 2013, it was announced that the Government of Slovakia would give asylum to the three remaining Uyghurs. When making the announcement the Government of Slovakia said that the three men had "never been suspected of nor charged with a criminal act of terrorism". A long-standing sticking point in getting third countries to accept former captives is that US negotiators wanted those countries to agree to impose draconian and expensive security measures on the former captives. Carol Rosenberg, of the Miami Herald, the journalist who has provided the most extensive coverage of the Guantanamo camp, described the announcement, following the releases of three other groups of men, earlier in December, marked a "significant milestone".

Rosenberg reported that the US military had transferred Yusef Abbas, Hajiakbar Abdulghuper and Saidullah Khalik, to Slovakia on December 30, 2013, in a "secret operation". Rosenberg quoted from a press release US District Court Judge Ricardo Urbina had prepared to be made public after the last Uyghur was transferred, where he expressed his dissatisfaction with the Obama administration for not honoring his original release order.

== Supreme Court's ruling in Boumediene v. Bush ==
On June 12, 2008, the United States Supreme Court ruled on Boumediene v. Bush. Its ruling overturned aspects of the Detainee Treatment Act and Military Commissions Act, allowing Guantanamo captives to access the US justice system for habeas petitions.

== Parhat v. Gates ==
On Monday, June 23, 2008, it was announced that a three judge Federal court of appeal had ruled, in Parhat v. Gates, on Friday, June 20, 2008, that the determination of Hozaifa Parhat's Combatant Status Review Tribunal was "invalid".

== Motions following Boumediene v. Bush ==
On July 7, 2008, a petition was filed on behalf of the seventeen Uyghurs. On August 5, 2008, the United States Department of Justice opposed Parhat being released in the US, and to having a judgment made on his habeas petition. The Government's opposition filing was 22 pages long.

== Petition to be moved from solitary confinement ==
In early August 2008, US District Court Judge Ricardo M. Urbina declined to rule in favor of transferring six of the Uyghurs from Camp 6 where captives are held in solitary confinement to Camp 4 where they live in communal barracks with fellow captives. Urbina's nine-page memorandum opinion addressed the needs of Hammad Memet, Khalid Ali, Edham Mamet, Bahtiyar Mahnut, Arkin Mahmud, Adel Noori.

What is clear is that no court has ever ruled that detainees, designated as enemy combatants, have a right to challenge the conditions of their confinement pursuant to the constitutional writ of habeas corpus. Furthermore, courts are reluctant to second-guess day-to-day operations of domestic prison facilities, especially when doing so intrudes upon the military and national security affairs. This deference combined with the paucity of evidence of irreparable injury and the petitioners' failure to articulate a specific constitutional right and standard from which to analyze the facts of this case presses the court to deny the petitioners' motion for a TRO and a preliminary injunction.

== No longer classed as "enemy combatants" ==
On September 30, 2008, Gregory Katsas, Assistant Attorney General filed a "notice of status" for the remaining Uyghur captives—stating that they would no longer be classed as "enemy combatants". According to The AM Law Daily the Department of Justice was scheduled to appear before Ricardo M Urbina on October 7, 2008, to defend classifying the men as enemy combatants.

Although they were no longer considered "enemy combatants" camp authorities continued to hold six of the men in solitary confinement.

On Tuesday October 7, 2008, US District Court Judge Ricardo Urbina ruled that the Uyghurs had to be brought to the US to appear in his court in Washington DC on Friday, 10 October 2008.

The United States Department of Justice filed an emergency motion to stay the Uyghurs' admission to the US. On October 8, 2008, a three judge appeal panel granted the emergency motion to stay the Uyghur's transfer. The judges stay was to enable the appeals court to consider the merits of the parties' arguments. The parties to file briefs by October 16, 2008.

On October 16, 2008, Clint Williamson, the State Department official responsible for negotiating a new home for the captives, complained that the Justice Department's description of the Uyghurs had undermined his efforts. Williamson is the State Department's ambassador-at-large for war crimes issues. The New York Times quoted Williamson's comment about cancelling his overseas trips following the Department of Justice claims:

I was scheduled to depart on another round of negotiations early this week. It was impossible to resolve some concerns we had about going forward at the time. As a result I canceled the trip.

== Supreme Court ruling on whether the judiciary can force captives to be released in the United States ==
On October 20, 2009, the United States Supreme Court announced it would hear an appeal filed on behalf of the Uyghurs, as to whether Justice Leon had the authority to order the Uyghurs to be released in the United States. A panel of appeal court judges had overruled Leon. The appeal was filed on behalf of Hazaifa Parhat and seven other of the Uyghur captives. But the court's ruling would apply to all the Uyghurs, and would affect the appeals of other captives whose habeas hearings have overturned their CSR Tribunals. On March 1, 2010, the Supreme Court ruled in a per curiam decision that no court had yet ruled on this case in light of the offers of resettlement. Therefore, the Supreme Court declined to rule on the question of whether a federal court has the right to release the prisoners held at Guantanamo Bay, as "[The Supreme Court is] a court of review, not of first view."

== Turkistan Islamic Party reaction ==
The Turkistan Islamic Party in the 2nd issue of its magazine "Islamic Turkistan" discussed the situation of Uyghur Turkistan Islamic Party members in Guantanamo Bay which was getting media attention.

== Uyghur detainees ==
ISN	Name	Arrival date	Release date	Notes
00102	Edham Mamet	2002-01-20	2009-10-31	Transferred to refugee status in Palau in October 2009.; His Summary of Evidence (CSRT) was drafted on November 5, 2004, six days after the "Information Paper" on the Uyghur captives.; Did not attend his CSRT.; Alleged to have participated in the Mazari Sharif prison uprising.; CSR Tribunal did not convene in Guantanamo.; Determined to have been an "enemy combatant", but there is no record that any annual Administrative Review Board hearings have been convened.
00103	Arkin Mahmud	2002-06-18	2010-02-04	Transferred to Switzerland in February 2010.; His Summary of Evidence (CSRT) was drafted on November 9, 2004, ten days after the "Information Paper" on the Uyghur captives was drafted.; Attended his CSRT.; Attended his ARB hearing.; Mahmud is not accused of attending a training camp or of engaging in hostilities, or of any association with Al Qaeda, the Taliban or any group associated with terrorism.; Mahmud traveled to Afghanistan to seek out his brother, who, he said he was surprised to learn, was attending a training camp.; Mahmud's release or transfer was authorized on January 9, 2006.
00201	Ahmad Tourson	2002-01-21	2009-10-31	Transferred to refugee status in Palau in October 2009.; Attended his CSRT.; Allegedly spent most of 2000 and 2001 working for a variety of militant groups.
00219	Abdul Razak Abdul Razakah	2002-06-08	2012-04-18	Given refugee status in El Salvador in April 2012.; Alleged to have guarded an Al-Qaida safe house in Jalalabad.; Said he supported himself by catering. He catered the food for the camp. He catered food to Uyghurs in Afghan hospitals.; Said he traveled to the camp, when the USA attacked, because he wanted to be with his countrymen.; Thirty-five pages of Tribunal documents were published in 2007.; Allegedly recruited by Hassan Maksum.; His Administrative Review Board recommended transfer from Guantanamo on November 17, 2005.; Attended his CSRT.; Said he was working as a driver, was not attending any training camps.; Acknowledged making a couple of deliveries of food to the Uyghur camp.
00250	Hassan Anvar	2002-02-07	2009-10-31	Transferred to refugee status in Palau in October 2009.; Alleged to have traveled on a false passport.; Didn't attend his CSRT, but he did submit a statement.; Stated he only fired a handful of bullets when shown how to use an AK-47.; His habeas corpus petition contained a seven-page memo containing otherwise unpublished information about all the Uyghurs.; The Fifth Denbeaux study, the No-hearing hearings, reported that Hassan Anvar's original Combatant Status Review Tribunal determined that he not an enemy combatant, but the DoD convened two further Tribunals in order to reverse that determination.; Although Anvar submitted a statement to the original Tribunal, the one he was allowed to attend, none of the transcripts of any of the unclassified sessions of any of his Tribunals were released.; Determined to have been an "enemy combatant", but there is no record that any annual Administrative Review Board hearings have been convened.
00260	Ahmed Adil; Ahnad Adil	2002-02-09	2006-05-05	Allegedly learned to "break down" an AK-47 in a construction camp in Afghanistan.; Denied any association to terrorism during his CSRT.; CSRT determined that he was not an "enemy combatant".; Wrote to Secretary of State Condoleezza Rice, pleading for her intercession to get released.; Transported to Albania on May 5, 2006.
00275	Yusef Abbas; Abd Al Sabr Abd Al Hamid Uthman; Abdu Supur; Abdul Sabour	2002-06-08	2013-12-30	Transferred to Slovakia on December 31, 2013.; Allegedly wounded by the American aerial bombardment of Afghanistan in Tora Bora.; Pointed out in his testimony that travel from China to Afghanistan was not illegal.; Determined to have been an "enemy combatant", but there is no record that any annual Administrative Review Board hearings have been convened.
00276	Akhdar Qasem Basit	2002-06-10	2006-05-05	Alleged to be a Uighur fighter.; Confirmed that he was shown how to fire an AK-47, and fired three or four bullets, at the construction camp in Afghanistan; Transported to Albania on May 5, 2006.
00277	Bahtiyar Mahnut; Bahtiyar Mahnut; Sadir Sabit	2002-06-10	2010-02-04	Transferred to refugee status in Switzerland.; Accused of fleeing the American aerial bombardment of Afghanistan.; Attended his CSRT.; His Tribunal President disputed that he had denied due process.; The Fifth Denbeaux study, the No-hearing hearings, criticized Mahnut's Tribunal's President for denying his witness requests because they might be "repetitive". The study pointed out that witnesses could only be denied for not being relevant or for not being "reasonably available".; Allegedly stayed at a Uyghur guest house in Jalalabad.; Allegedly served with the Taliban near Mazari Sharif.; Disputed that any Uyghur group would ally itself to the United States' enemies because the Uyghurs are counting on U.S. support.; Cleared for release or transfer in 2005.
00278	Abdul Helil Mamut; Abd Al Nasir	2002-06-10	2009-06-11	Transferred to guest worker status in Bermuda.; Alleged to have been present in the Uyghur camp during the American aerial bombardment of Afghanistan.; Testified he had studied at a technical college in Lahore for three years and had only gone to stay at the Uyghur construction camp after he flunked out.; His board recommended his transfer on November 18, 2005.
00279	Haji Mohammed Ayub	2002-06-10	2006-05-05	Attended his CSRT.; Transported to Albania on May 5, 2006.
00280	Saidullah Khalik		2013-12-30	Transferred to Slovakia on December 31, 2013.; No record that he attended his CSR Tribunal.; Was wounded during the American aerial bombardment of Afghanistan.; Determined to have been an "enemy combatant", but there is no record that any annual Administrative Review Board hearings have been convened.
00281	Abdul Ghappar Abdul Rahman	2002-06-10	2009-10-31	Given refugee status in Palau in October 2009.; Attended his CSRT.; Determined to have been an "enemy combatant", but there is no record that any annual Administrative Review Board hearings have been convened.; A rare letter from "Abdulghappar Turkistani" was published on March 20, 2008. According to Abdulghappar all the remaining Uyghurs were being held, in solitary confinement, in the high security Camp 6.
00282	Hajiakbar Abdulghupur		2013-12-30	Transferred to Slovakia on December 31, 2013.; Attended his CSRT.; Determined to have been an "enemy combatant", but there is no record that any annual Administrative Review Board hearings have been convened.
00283	Abu Bakr Qasim	2002-06-10	2006-05-05	Alleged to have received a month of military training.; Testified he did not receive any military training.; CSRT determined that he was not an "enemy combatant".; Transported to Albania on May 5, 2006.
00285	Abdullah Abdulqadirakhun; Jalal Jalaldin	2002-06-12	2009-06-11	Transferred to guest worker status in Bermuda.; Testified that Hassan Maksum showed him how to fire a couple of rifle bullets.; Testified that the camp was incomplete, had no latrines, and that most of their time was spent in construction.; Determined to have been an "enemy combatant", but there is no record that any annual Administrative Review Board hearings have been convened.
00289	Dawut Abdurehim	2002-06-12	2009-10-31	Transferred to refugee status in Palau in October 2009.; Attended his CSRT.; Determined to have been an "enemy combatant", but there is no record that any annual Administrative Review Board hearings have been convened.
00293	Adel Abdulhehim	2002-06-10	2006-05-05	Attended his CSRT.; Transported to Albania on May 5, 2006.
00295	Emam Abdulahat	2002-06-14	2009-06-11	Transferred to guest worker status in Bermuda.; Attended his CSRT.; Determined to have been an "enemy combatant", but there is no record that any annual Administrative Review Board hearings have been convened.
00320	Hozaifa Parhat	2002-05-03	2009-06-11	Transferred to guest worker status in Bermuda.; Parhat acknowledged being shown how to use two different weapons while in Afghanistan.; Parhat disputed that the Taliban or al Qaida funded the camp.; Determined to have been an "enemy combatant", but there is no record that any annual Administrative Review Board hearings have been convened.; On June 20, 2008, a three judge appeals court ruled that his classification as an enemy combatant was "invalid".
00328	Hammad Memet; Ahmad Muhamman Yaqub	2002-05-03	2012-04-18	Given refugee status in El Salvador in April 2012.; Alleged to have spent over a year at the Uyghur camp.; Alleged to have been a weapons trainer at the Uyghur camp.; The detainee denied any knowledge of the Islamic Movement of Turkistan (IMT).; Allegedly fought against the Northern Alliance.; The only Uyghur captive alleged to be a member of al Qaida.
00584	Adel Noori	2002-05-05	2009-10-31	Transferred to refugee status in Palau in October 2009.; Alleged to have tried to hide his identity under a burka.; Attended his CSRT—at just half a page his summarized transcript was among the half dozen briefest.; Denied receiving any weapons training.; On July 18, 2008, George M. Clarke III informed the US District Court that The government has refused to provide petitioner Adel Noori's CSRT record to his counsel.

Radio Free Asia named the five released Uyghurs, but the report identified the Uyghurs with different transliterations than that used in the U.S. press release: Ababehir Qasim, Adil Abdulhakim, Ayuphaji Mahomet, Ahter and Ahmet.

== See also ==
- East Turkestan
