= Adel Abdulhehim =

Uyghur refugee and former Guantanamo Bay detainee

- Born: October 10, 1974 (age 52); Ghulja, Xinjiang, China
- Detained at: Guantanamo
- Other name: A'Del Abdu al-Hakim
- ISN: 293
- Status: Refugee in Albania

Adel Abdulhehim or Adel Abdul Hakim is a citizen of the People's Republic of China from the Uighur ethnic group. He was held in extrajudicial detention in the United States-controlled Guantanamo Bay detainment camps in Cuba.Joint Task Force Guantanamo counter-terrorism analysts report he was born on October 10, 1974, in Ghulja, Xinjiang.

Abdulhehim was captured in late 2001 and detained in Camp Delta. He is one of the 38 detainees whose Combatant Status Review Tribunal concluded he had not been an "illegal combatant" after all.

Abdulhehim is one of approximately two dozen detainees from the Uighur ethnic group.

According to an article distributed by the Associated Press, Abdulhehim, his compatriot Abu Baker Qassim and eight others were moved from imprisonment at the main compound of Camp Delta to a less harsh imprisonment at Camp Iguana.

A February 18, 2006, article in The Washington Times claimed that Abu Bakker Qassim and A'Del Abdu al-Hakim had received military training in Afghanistan. It reported they were not classified as "illegal combatants" because they intended to go home and employ their training against the Chinese government and were released. Some earlier reports had described them as economic refugees who were slowly working their way to Turkey.

== Bounty ==
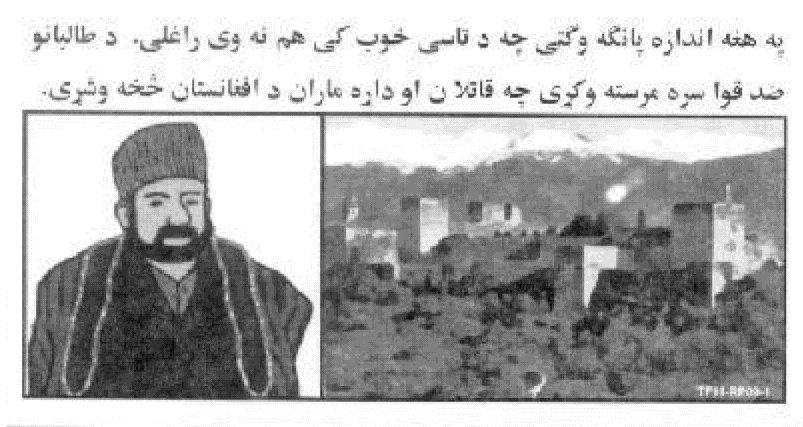
The caption to this bounty poster, distributed in Afghanistan, states: "You can receive millions of dollars for helping the Anti-Taliban Force catch Al-Qaida and Taliban murderers. This is enough money to take care of your family, your village, your tribe for the rest of your life. Pay for livestock and doctors and school books and housing for all your people."

Hakim and Abu Bakker Qassim report they were sold to US forces by bounty hunters.

== Press reports ==
In January 2007, Abdulhehim told the BBC that "Albanian people are very welcoming and there are many Muslim brothers here".

However, in Albania, Hakim was separated from his wife and their three children, as Albania did not permit family-reunification. In November 2007, he was granted a 4-day visa to Sweden, to lecture about human rights in Stockholm. Since his sister lived in Sweden, he applied for asylum there. However, in June 2008, the immigration authorities in Sweden announced that Hakim had been denied political asylum.

On June 15, 2008, the McClatchy News Service published articles based on interviews with 66 former Guantanamo captives. McClatchy reporters interviewed Adel Abdulhehim. The McClatchy interview records his account of his "military training" in the Uyghur construction camp:

“They had some guns, some AK-47s, and asked us if we wanted to learn to use them. Really, I was curious. I'd never been allowed to handle one before. We went out once, for an hour or so. I think I shot three or four bullets, at rocks. That was it.”
