= Parhat v. Gates =

- Court: United States Court of Appeals for the District of Columbia Circuit
- Full case name: Huzaifa Parhat v. Robert M. Gates, Secretary of Defense, et al.
- Argued: April 4, 2008
- Decided: June 20, 2008
- Citation: 532 F.3d 834

Court membership
- Judges sitting: David B. Sentelle, Merrick Garland, Thomas B. Griffith

Case opinions
- Majority: Garland, joined by a unanimous court

Parhat v. Gates, 532 F.3d 834 (D.C. Cir. 2008), was a case involving a petition for review under the Detainee Treatment Act of 2005 filed on behalf of Huzaifa Parhat, and sixteen other Uyghur detainees held in extrajudicial detention in the United States Guantanamo Bay detention camps, in Cuba.

== Rasul v. Bush ==
Initially, the Bush Presidency asserted that none of the captives apprehended during the "global war on terror" were protected by the Geneva Conventions. The Bush Presidency asserted that the Guantanamo Bay Naval Base was not United States territory, and that it was not subject to United States law. Consequently, they challenged that the captives were entitled to submit writs of habeas corpus.

The Supreme Court of the United States ruled, in Rasul v. Bush, that the Guantanamo base was covered by US law.

== Appeal under the Detainee Treatment Act ==
Susan Baker Manning, one of Parhat's attorneys, commented:

If we're going to hold people, possibly for the rest of their lives, it seems eminently fair that we should look at all the evidence to see if they are or are not the people who should be at Guantánamo.

On June 23, 2008, a three-judge panel of the U.S. Court of Appeals for the D.C. Circuit announced its decision of three days earlier overturning the determination of Parhat's Combatant Status Review Tribunal. The court had only published a one paragraph announcement as its full ruling contained classified material, and an unclassified version had not yet been prepared.

On June 30, 2008, the court published a 39-page opinion, written by Circuit Judge Garland. The ruling was published with a limited number of redactions.

== See also ==
- Qassim v. Bush
