= Camp Iguana =

Detention facility at Guantánamo Bay

- Part of Naval Station Guantanamo Bay
- Guantánamo Bay, Cuba

Site information
- Type: U.S. military detention facility (juveniles; later compliant/cleared detainees)
- Operator: United States Southern Command
- Controlled by: Joint Task Force Guantanamo (JTF-GTMO)
- Condition: Operational (as of 2012)

Site history
- In use: 2002–2004; 2005–

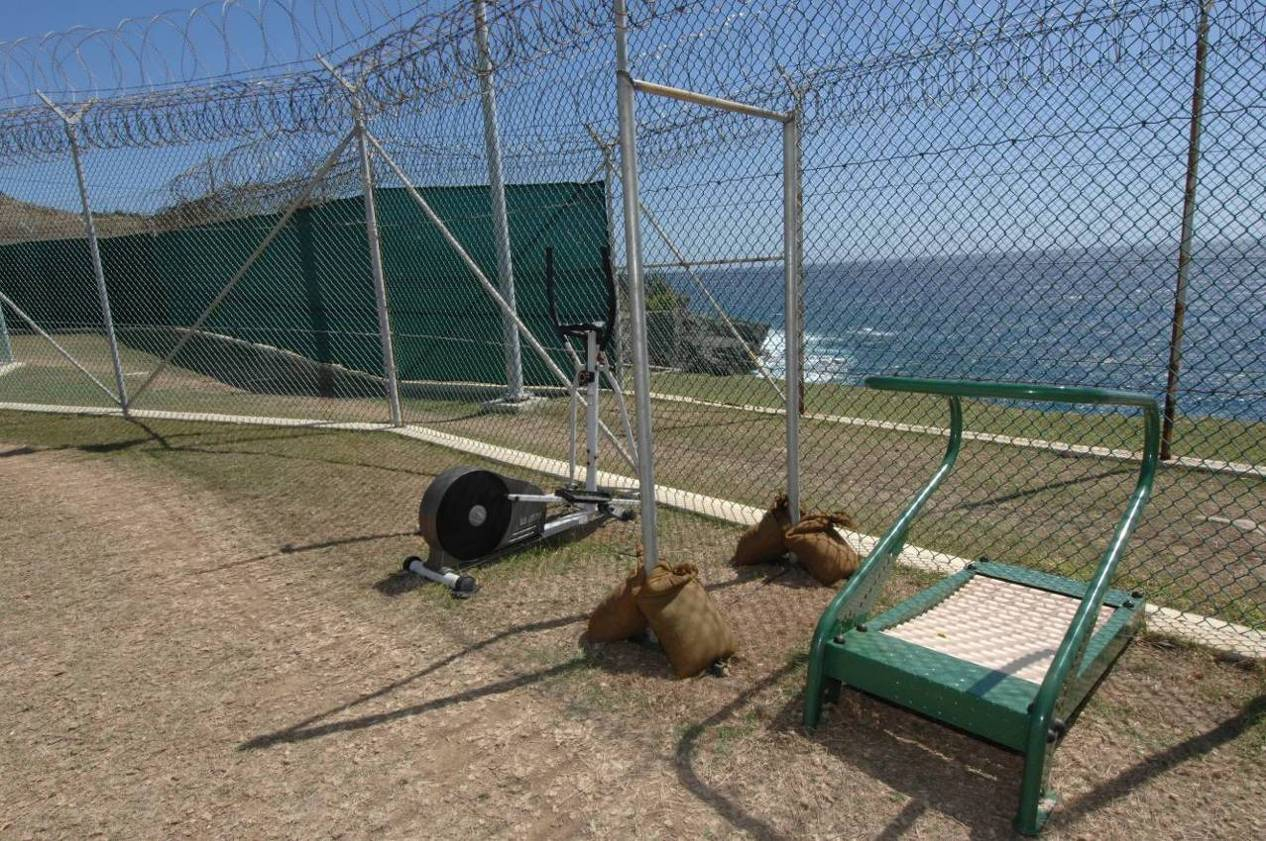
Recreation yard, Camp Iguana

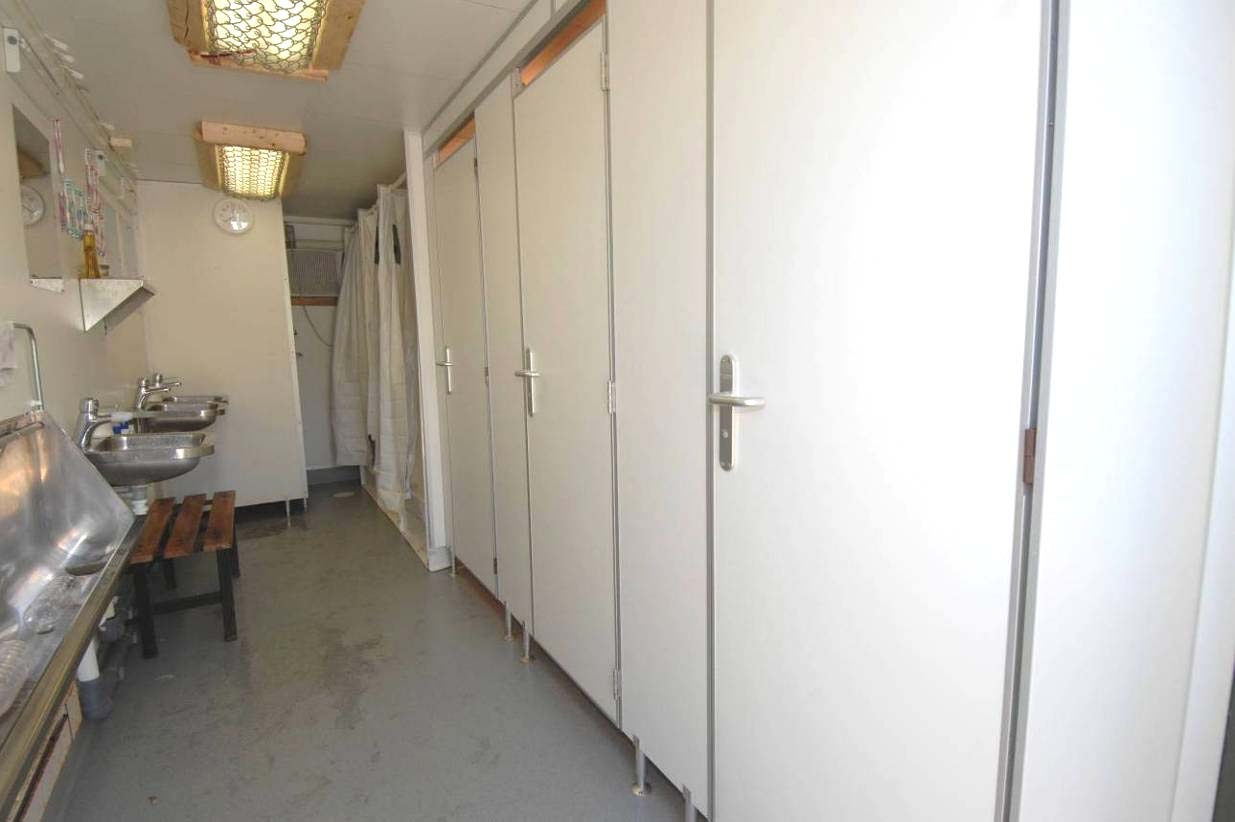
Camp Iguana showers and restroom

Camp Iguana is a small compound in the detention camp complex on the US Naval base at Guantánamo Bay, Cuba. Camp Iguana originally held three child detainees, who camp spokesmen then claimed were the only detainees under age 16 (the age at which DOD defined minors). It was closed in the winter of 2004 when the three were sent back to their native countries.

When the Department of Defense was forced in 2005 by US District Court Judge Jed Rakoff's court order to release the identities of all the detainees, DOD acknowledged it had detained up to twenty minors (under the age of 18, the international coming of age) in the adult portion of the prison.

In 2005 Camp Iguana was re-opened to hold some of the 38 detainees classified in Combatant Status Review Tribunals as "no longer enemy combatants." These included several Uyghurs, who could not return to China because of the high risk of persecution there. They were subject to delays in resettlement as diplomatic efforts tried to place them in countries other than their country of origin or the United States.

== Used for juvenile detainees ==
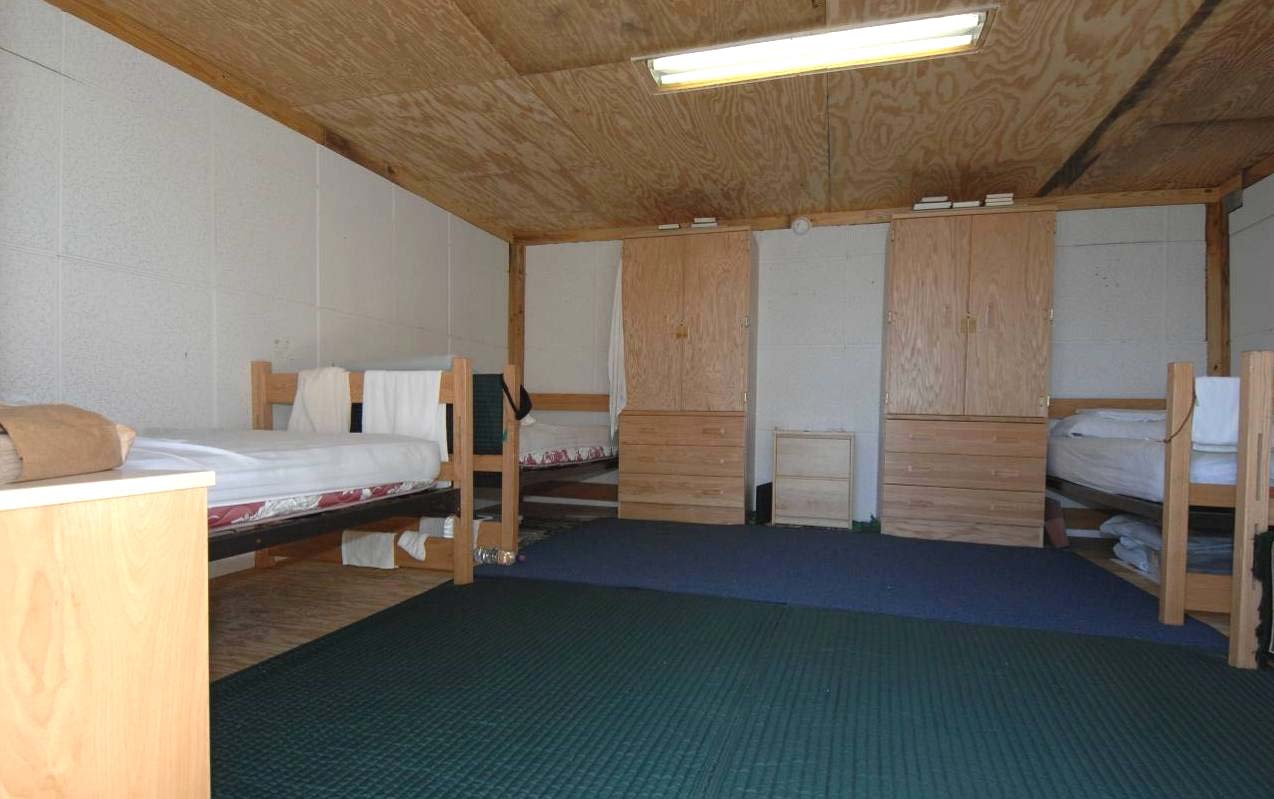
Dormitory, Camp Iguana

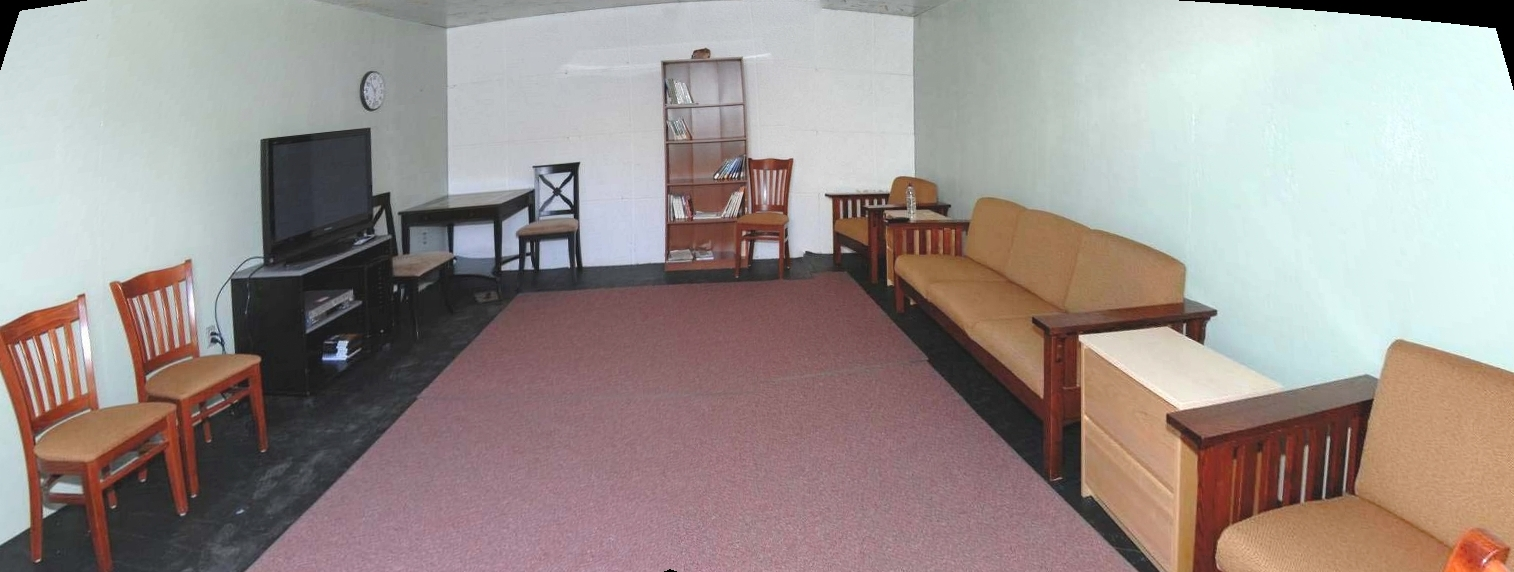
Living area, Camp Iguana

Beginning in 2002, the US used Camp Iguana for juvenile detainees. Elaine Chao, then the U.S. Secretary of Labor has spoken about the responsibility to give child soldiers special treatment, to provide help for them to re-integrate into society.

If the Americans had applied the Geneva Conventions at the battlefield, its forces would have reviewed detainees more closely in Afghanistan and other areas of capture. The Geneva Conventions entitle persons captured during warfare to a "prompt, open tribunal" for a fair determination of their status—whether they should be considered civilians, POWs, or enemy combatants. Critics have said a more thorough review at the beginning would have meant the juveniles would never have been transported from Afghanistan.

The executive branch of the United States government claimed at the time that enemy combatants were beyond the jurisdiction of the US courts. The United States Supreme Court overruled executive efforts to keep the enemy combatants outside the US judicial system; in decisions in 2004, it ruled that both American and foreign detainees had the right to challenge their detentions before an impartial tribunal. The executive branch established Combatant Status Review Tribunals in 2004 to evaluate whether detainees were enemy combatants.

In a BBC interview in 2004, Naqibullah, a young Afghan teenager, described being treated humanely, and receiving an education, while in Camp Iguana.

A 2 February 2004 memo summarized a meeting between General Geoffrey Miller, commander of the Guantanamo Bay detention camp, and his staff and Vincent Cassard of the ICRC. Geoffrey Miller said:

Also, CDR Timby is in the process of finishing the report from the arrival and departure of the juveniles, they showed exceptional progress. 2 of the 3 came here with psychological problems and left here with none. They are looking forward to starting a life again. They were very excited to return home and were in good spirits."

In the spring of 2005, the media reported that other detainees were held at Guantanamo who had first been detained at ages lower than 18 (the international definition of a minor.) A New York Times article published on 13 June 2005, said there were at least six other teenagers, who were kept within the general population and treated as adults. Military officials explained this as saying they had to estimate detainee ages. :"They don't come with birth certificates," said Col. Brad K. Blackner, the chief public affairs officer at the detention camp. Col. David McWilliams, the chief spokesman for the United States Southern Command in Miami, which runs the prison operation, said that the authorities were fairly confident of their estimates. "We used bone scans in some cases and age was determined by medical evidence as best we could," he said." Military officials explained this as saying they had to estimate detainee ages.

Omar Khadr was 15 when captured. United States intelligence officers were reported to know his age and identity because of the prominence of his father, Ahmed Khadr and because his older brother Abdurahman cooperated with the CIA as an undercover agent at Guantanamo. A Washington Post article from 29 October 2002 reported:

One particularly talkative prisoner there is Omar Khadr, who at sixteen is one of the youngest prisoners in U.S. custody. U.S. officials allege that on 27 July he killed a U.S. Special Forces medic, Sgt. Christopher Speer, during a four-hour, house-to-house battle in the village of Ayub Kheyl. The wounded youth was captured, taken to Bagram, treated for his wounds and interrogated.

Abdul Salam Mureef Ghaithan Al Shehri, a Saudi citizen who was fifteen when he was captured, celebrated his eighteenth birthday in Guantanamo Bay, in late April 2005.

In an interview broadcast on the BBC on 9 September 2005, Clive Stafford Smith reported that the continued incarceration of juveniles between 16 and 18 at Guantanamo Bay was a catalyst for the protests of the hunger strikes, which took place during the summer of 2005. The United Nations determined that to forcefeed the strikers amounts to torture. At the time, Smith said that as many as twenty teenagers remained imprisoned at Guantanamo, some of whom were being kept in long-term, solitary confinement. The legal director of Reprieve and a prominent British human rights lawyer, he represents 37 Guantanamo detainees.

In May 2009 Afghan human rights workers challenged the American bone-scan estimate for the age of Mohammed Jawad, a former detainee. They assert he had been as young as 12 or 13 when he was captured in December 2002.

== Former detainees waiting for resettlement ==
On 25 August 2005, the Associated Press reported that Camp Iguana was being reopened to hold detainees whose CSRTs had concluded that they were not "enemy combatants".

Others who were declassified as enemy combatants, including Sami Al Laithi, continued to be detained in Camp Delta.

On 5 May 2006 five Uighurs, who had been held in Camp Iguana, were transported to a refugee center in Albania prior to a review of their writs of habeas corpus. This was scheduled for the Monday after the weekend. These five were among a total of 15 Uighurs who were reported to have been determined not to have been "enemy combatants." They were kept at Guantanamo as the US tried to place them; they feared return to China because of persecution.

In a telephone interview, Abu Baker Qassim, one of the Uighurs sent to Albania, said Camp Iguana had held nine innocent men before their departure. The other four innocent men had been a Russian, an Algerian, a Libyan, and a man who had been born in Saudi Arabia to Uighur exiles.

On 30 September 2008, Assistant Attorney General Gregory Katsas filed a "notice of status" on the seventeen remaining Uyghur detainees. He said they were no longer to be treated as enemy combatants. Their attorneys pointed out that several of their clients remained in solitary confinement, which is considered severe punishment. The DOD said that all the Uyghurs would be transferred to Camp Iguana for better conditions.

== See also ==
- Asadullah Abdul Rahman
- Muhammad Ismail Agha
- List of Guantanamo Bay detainees
