= Abdullah Abdulqadirakhun =

Uyghur refugee and former Guantanamo Bay detainee

- Born: June 18, 1979 (age 47); Xinjiang, China
- Detained at: Guantanamo
- Other name: Jalal Jalaldin
- ISN: 285
- Charge: No charge (unlawfully detained)
- Status: Released

Abdullah Abdulqadirakhun is a Uyghur refugee, who was held for more than seven years in Guantanamo Bay detention camps, in Cuba.

The Department of Defense reports that Abdulqadirakhum was born on June 18, 1979, in Xinjiang, China and assigned him the Internment Serial Number 285.

Abdulqadirakhun was one of the 22 Uyghurs held in Guantanamo. It was later learned that he was innocent of the claims against him.

He won his habeas corpus in 2008. Judge Ricardo Urbina declared his detention as unlawful and ordered to set him free in the United States. He was sent to Bermuda in June 2009 together with three other Uyghurs, Khalil Mamut, Huzaifa Parhat and Emam Abdulahat, on June 11, 2009.
