= Hajiakbar Abdulghupur =

Uyghur detainee at Guantanamo Bay

- Born: March 15, 1973 (age 52); Ghulja, Xinjiang Province, China
- Released: December 2013; Slovakia
- Detained at: Guantanamo
- ISN: 282
- Status: Released

Hajiakbar Abdulghupur is a citizen of China, who was held in the United States Guantanamo Bay detention camps, in Cuba for many years.

The DoD estimates that Abdulghupur was born in 1973 in Ghulja, Xinjiang Uyghur Autonomous Region, China.

He was one of the 22 Uighurs held in Guantanamo for many years, even though it became clear early on that they were innocent.

He won his habeas corpus case in 2008. Judge Ricardo Urbina declared his detention unlawful and ordered for him to be set free in the United States.

In December 2013, after having been held at Guantanamo for over eleven years, Abdulghupur was transferred to Slovakia.
