= Hassan Anvar =

Uyghur refugee and former Guantanamo Bay detainee

Anwar Hassan
- Born: 25 August 1974 (age 52); Ürümqi, Xinjiang, China
- Detained at: Guantanamo
- Other name: Hassan Anvar
- ISN: 250
- Charge: No charge (unlawfully detained)
- Status: Released

Anwar Hassan (born 25 August 1974) is a Chinese Uyghur refugee who was wrongly imprisoned for more than seven years in the United States Guantanamo Bay detention camps.

Hassan is one of the 22 Uighurs held in Guantanamo for many years despite it becoming clear early on that they were innocent.

== Combatant Status Review Tribunals ==
Initially, the Bush administration asserted that they could withhold all the protections of the Geneva Conventions to captives from the war on terror. This policy was challenged before the Judicial branch. Critics argued that the USA could not evade its obligation to conduct competent tribunals to determine whether captives are or are not, entitled to the protections of prisoner of war status.

Subsequently, the Department of Defense instituted the Combatant Status Review Tribunals. The Tribunals, however, were not authorized to determine whether the captives were lawful combatants—rather they were merely empowered to make a recommendation as to whether the captive had previously been correctly determined to match the Bush administration's definition of an enemy combatant.

Hassan is one of the captives known to have had multiple reviews convened, after his initial review determined he was not an enemy combatant.

According to the study entitled, No-hearing hearings, Hassan Anvar did not choose to attend his Tribunal.

The study identified Hassan as one of the captive whose first Tribunal had determined that they should not had been classified as an "enemy combatant" in the first place, only to have subsequent Tribunals convened, which reversed the earlier determination.

== Current status ==
On 4 February 2009, The Globe and Mail reported that Hassan Anvar's refugee claim, and the refugee claims of two of his compatriots were close to completion. The article quoted Mehmet Tohti, a Uyghur human rights activist who stated that he had met with Immigration Minister Jason Kenney. According to the Globe, Tohti claimed there had been a positive consensus to admit Anvar, and two men whose lawyers have not authorized their names to be released.

The Don Valley Refugee Resettlement Organization has worked to sponsor Anvar's refugee claim.

== Temporary asylum in Palau ==
In June 2009, the government of Palau announced that they would offer temporary asylum to some of the Uyghurs. The government of Palau sent a delegation Guantanamo, and interviewed some of the remaining Uyghurs. Some of the Uyghurs declined to be interviewed by the Palauns. In the end the government of Palau offered asylum to twelve of the remaining thirteen Uyghurs. Palau declined to offer asylum to one of the Uyghurs who suffered from a mental disorder, brought on by detention, that was too profound to be treated in Palau.

On 31 October 2009, "Anwar Hassan", Ahmad Tourson, Abdul Ghappar Abdul Rahman, Edham Mamet, Dawut Abdurehim and Adel Noori were released and transferred to Palau.

On 29 June 2015, Nathan Vanderklippe, reporting in The Globe and Mail, wrote that all the Uyghurs had quietly left Palau. The Globe confirmed that Palau's agreement to give refuge to the Uyghurs was reached after the USA agreed to various secret payments. Those payments included $93,333 to cover each Uyghurs living expenses. The Globe confirmed that controversy still surrounded former President Johnson Toribiong who had used some of those funds to billet the Uyghurs in houses belonging to his relatives.

Vanderklippe reported that the men had never felt they could fit in with the Palauns. Some of the men compared Palau with a lusher, larger Guantanamo. Some of the men were able to bring their wives to Palau. Attempts to hold most regular jobs failed, due to cultural differences. Attempts to use their traditional leather-working skills to be self-employed failed. Eventually, all six men were employed as night-time security guards, a job that did not require interaction with Palauns.

One of the men's young toddler, conceived and born on Palau, died after he fell off a balcony. According to Vanderklippe, the men's departure from Palau was quietly arranged with cooperation with American officials. He reported they left, one or two at a time, on commercial flights. Palaun officials would not share the Uyghurs destination.
