= Arkin Mahmud =

Uyghur refugee and former Guantanamo Bay detainee

- Born: July 1, 1964 (age 62); Ghulja, Xinjiang, China
- Detained at: Guantanamo
- ISN: 103
- Charge: No charge (unlawfully detained)
- Status: Transferred to Switzerland
- Children: 2

Arkin Mahmud is a Uyghur refugee best known for the seven and a half years he spent in the United States Guantanamo Bay detention camps, in Cuba.

Joint Task Force Guantanamo counter-terrorism analysts reports Mahmud was born on July 1, 1964, in Ghulja, Xinjiang, China.

Arkin traveled to Afghanistan in order to look for his younger brother Bahtiyar Mahnut. He is one of approximately twenty-two captives from the Uighur ethnic group. By the summer of 2009, Arkin's mental health had deteriorated so profoundly he wasn't offered sanctuary in Palau. For some time in 2005, during his stay in Guantanamo, he was held in solitary confinement.

He won his habeas corpus in 2008. Judge Ricardo Urbina declared his detention as unlawful and ordered to set him free in the United States.

Until his transfer to Switzerland on March 23, 2010, Arkin Mahmud had been held at Guantanamo for more than seven and a half years despite it became clear early on that he like the other Uyghurs in Guantanamo was innocent.

== Writ of habeas corpus ==
A writ of habeas corpus, Arkina Amahmud v. George W. Bush, was submitted on Arkina Amahmud's behalf.

== Mental health ==
In July 2009, the Pacific Ocean country of Palau offered sanctuary to all the remaining Uyghur captives in Guantanamo, except Arkin. Arkin's younger brother Bahtiyar declined the invitation of sanctuary in Palau in order to stay with Arkin. Due to reports from camp guards that Arkin had broken the camp's rules, from 2005 he was held in isolation from other captives.

Arkin told Elizabeth Gibson, his habeas counsel, "I know I'll die in here. In China, at least I would have a trial and sentence."

== Granted asylum in Switzerland ==
Switzerland granted political asylum to Arkin Mahmud and Bahtiyar Mahnut on February 4, 2010. Swiss authorities helped them settle in Canton of Jura. Historian Andy Worthington, author of The Guantanamo Files commented that Switzerland's grant of Asylum preserved the Obama Presidency from political embarrassment, because all the Uyghurs had been offered a new home, except for Arkin Mahmud, and that the Swiss offer of asylum would complicate the habeas petitions of the four remaining Uyghur captives who had declined to agree to accept refugee status in Palau.
