= Khalid Ali =

Emirati footballer (born 1981)

Personal information
- Full name: Khalid Ali Al-Hammadi
- Date of birth: March 24, 1981 (age 45)
- Height: 5 ft 8 in (1.73 m)
- Position: Defender

Senior career*
Years	Team	Apps	(Gls)
2001–2002	Khor Fakkan Club		(1)
2003–2009	Al Jazira Club		(1)

International career
2003–2005	United Arab Emirates	4	(0)
Medal record
First place	UAE Federation Cup	2007
First place	GCC Champions League	2007
- * Club domestic league appearances and goals

Khalid Ali (born March 24, 1981) is an Emirati football defender who played for United Arab Emirates at the 2004 AFC Asian Cup.
