= List of Guantanamo Bay detainees =

All known detainees by nationality
1. Afghans (29.0%)
2. Saudis (17.0%)
3. Yemenis (15.0%)
4. Pakistanis (9.00%)
5. Algerians (3.00%)
6. Others (27.0%)

As of January 6, 2025, 15 detainees remain at Guantanamo Bay. This list of Guantánamo prisoners has the known identities of prisoners at the Guantanamo Bay detention camp in Cuba, but is compiled from various sources and is incomplete. In official documents, the United States Department of Defense (DoD) continues to make intermittent efforts to redact prisoner's names.

The Washington Post maintains a list of the prisoners known or suspected to have been held in Guantánamo Bay.

On March 3, 2006, the DoD partially complied with a court order to release the names of the remaining Guantánamo detainees. The court order required the DoD to release the names of all the detainees. Initially, the DoD released only 317 names. Then, on April 19, 2006, the DoD released a list with 558 names in what appears to be a fax or other scanned image. The Associated Press published the list in more accessible text form. Pentagon spokesmen Bryan Whitman justified withholding the names out of a concern for the detainees' privacy, although Judge Jed Rakoff had already dismissed this argument. On April 20, 2006, the DoD released a portable document format file that listed 558 names. The 558 individuals on the list were those whose detention had been reviewed by a Combatant Status Review Tribunal (CSRT). The list gave the detainee's ID number, their name, and their home country.

The names of several hundred prisoners who had been released prior to the commencement of the CSRTs were not released. The list did not specify whether the prisoners were still in detention at Guantanamo; whether they had been determined to be "enemy combatants"; whether they were released, or repatriated to the custody of their home countries. On May 15, 2006, the DoD released what they called a complete list of all 759 former and current inmates who had been held in military custody in the detainment camps after a Freedom of Information Act (FOIA) action was filed by the Associated Press. On June 17, 2013, the Miami Herald published a list, also obtained using the FOIA, of 48 prisoners who were designated for indefinite detainment. On May 31, 2014, the Obama Administration was reported to have swapped 5 prisoners (Abdul Haq Wasiq, Mullah Norullah Nori, Khairullah Khairkhwa, Mohammed Nabi and Mohammed Fazi) in return for Sergeant Bowe Bergdahl who was captured after deserting his post.

On January 16, 2017, the Federal government of the United States announced that ten prisoners were released to Oman, leaving about 45 detainees. In December 2024, 4 prisoners were released, and on January 6, 2025, 11 Yemeni prisoners were transferred to Oman, bringing down the total number of prisoners left to 15. Of all prisoners at Guantanamo, Afghans were the largest group (29 percent), followed by Saudi Arabians (17 percent), Yemenis (15 percent), Pakistanis (9 percent), and Algerians (3 percent). France and the United Kingdom are the most represented in Europe, with 16 and 12 prisoners respectively. Overall, 50 nationalities were present at Guantanamo.

== Migrant Operations Center ==
The Guantanamo base has for many years included a facility, known as the Migrant Operations Center, where U.S. immigration officials have screened some asylum-seekers intercepted at sea. That area is separate from Guantanamo Bay's post-9/11 military prison. Since February, 2025, the Trump administration has moved varying numbers of persons, detained in the mainland US during immigration-related operations, to Guantanamo for deportation processing. Names of those detained at Guantanamo since 2025 have not been officially released.

== List ==
Roughly 780 detainees have been brought to Guantanamo. Although most of these have been released without charge, the United States government continues to classify many of these released detainees as "enemy combatants". By January 19, 2017, at the end of the Obama Administration, the detention center remained open with 41 detainees remaining. As of May 2025, 15 detainees are still held at Guantanamo.

CSRT is Combatant Status Review Tribunals.

Individuals with "SAMWL" are listed on the Saudi Arabian most wanted list, released in February 2009.

Details about seven deaths reported as suicides and reports of attempted suicides are at Guantanamo suicide attempts.

Name	Nationality	Captured	Notes
Aamer, Shaker	Saudi Arabia	Jan 2002	Last British resident held without charge or trial.; Has been described as unofficial spokesman for the prisoners.; Alleges that he has been tortured.; Released Oct 2015.
Abasin, Said	Afghanistan		Kabul taxi driver who was proved innocent and released after over one year of detention.
Abbasi, Feroz	United Kingdom	—	Released Jan 2005
Abdallah Osama Alkhabiry	Yemen		Committed suicide in the camp on September 8, 2012.
Abdallah, Muhamed Hussein	Somalia	—	Captured in Pakistan in May 2002 and was transferred to Somaliland on November 4, 2008.
Abderrahmane, Slimane Hadj	Denmark	—	Released; Announced intention to 'return to the fight', believed to have subsequently died in Syria
Abdul Rahman, Wesam	Jordan		
Abdulahat, Emam	China	—	Ethnic Uyghur; Went through CSRT
Abdulghupur, Hajiakbar	China	—	Ethnic Uyghur; Continued detention considered by CSRT
Abdullah, Abu	Algeria		
Abdullah, Ahmad	Morocco		
Abdullah, Noorudeen	Morocco		
Abdullah, Umar			
Abdulqadirakhum, Abdullah	China	—	Ethnic Uyghur; Went through CSRT
Abdulraheem, Othman	Yemen		
Abdulsalam, Reswan	Morocco		
Abdurehim, Dawut	China	—	Ethnic Uyghur; Went through CSRT
Abedin, Zain Ul	Tajikistan	—	Transferred to Tajikistan on October 31, 2008.
Adil, Ahmed	China	—	Continued detention considered by CSRT
Agha, Muhammad Ismail	Afghanistan	2002	13 to 14 years old when he was captured; Released on January 29, 2004
Ahmad, Ali	Pakistan	—	Released
Ahmad, Ejaz	Pakistan		
Ahmad, Hamed Abderrahman	Spain	—	Repatriated to Spanish custody, tried, convicted, and released on appeal; Ahmed's name does not appear on the May 15, 2006 DoD list of Guantanamo detainees
Ahmad, Majid Mahmud Abdu	Yemen	—	
Ahmed, Abdul Rahman Uthman	Saudi Arabia	—	
Ahmed, Ali Abdullah	Yemen	—	Died in custody on June 10, 2006
Ahmed, Fahmi Abdullah	Yemen	—	Continued detention considered by CSRT
Ahmed, Faluvi Abdullah	Yemen		
Ahmed, Faruq Ali	Yemen	—	Continued detention considered by CSRT
Ahmed, Munir	Pakistan		Repatriated late 2004; Released June 28, 2005; Ahmed's name does not appear on the May 15, 2006 DoD list of Guantanamo detainees
Ahmed, Ruhal	United Kingdom	2001	Released March 2004; Alleges abuse
Ahmed, Sarfraz	Pakistan		Name appears as "Sarfaraz Ahmed" on the Washington Post list of detainees; Repatriated late 2004; Released June 28, 2005; Ahmed's name does not appear on the May 15, 2006 DoD list of Guantanamo detainees
Akhmyarov, Rustam	Russia	—	Repatriated to Russia in early 2004
Al Aasmi, Assem Matruq Mohammad			
Al Adahi, Mohamed	Yemen		
Al Ajmi, Abdullah Saleh Ali	Kuwait	—	Repatriated on November 4, 2005; Killed himself in a suicide attack in Iraq in April 2008 in which seven others died
Al Amin, Mohammed	Mauritania		Reported to have been sexually abused, beaten, starved, sleep deprived; Al Amin's name does not appear on the May 15, 2006 DoD list of Guantanamo detainees
Al Anazi, Abdullah	Saudi Arabia		
Al Areeni, Khalid	Saudi Arabia		
Al Asadi, Mohamed Ahmed	Yemen		
Al Aseemi, Fahd Sultan Ubaid	Saudi Arabia		
Al Askari, Mohsin Ali	Yemen		
Al Asmar, Khalid	Jordan		
Al Assani, Fahmi Salem	Yemen		
Al Atabi, Buad Thif Allah			
Al Azmi, Saad Madai Saad	Kuwait	—	Repatriated on November 4, 2005
Al Azraq, Majid Hamoud	Yemen		
Al Baasi, Mohsin Abdullah	Yemen		
Al Badaah, Abdul Aziz bin Abdur Rahman	Saudi Arabia		
Al Bahlul, Ali Hamza Ahmed Sulayman	Yemen	—	Alleged to have made recruiting videos for al Qaeda; One of the first four detainees to face charges before military commission; Al Bahlul's name does not appear on the May 15, 2006 DoD list of Guantanamo detainees
Al Bahooth, Ziyad bin Salih bin Muhammad	Saudi Arabia		
Al Baidhani, Abdulkhaliq	Yemen		
al Banna, Jamil	Jordan, UK resident	—	Apprehended on a business trip to Gambia; Released
Al Barakati, Khalid	Saudi Arabia		
Al Bedani, Abdul Khaled Ahmed Sahleh	Saudi Arabia	2001	
Al Bidna, Sa Ad Ibraham Sa Ad			
Al Blooshi, Salah Abdul Rasool	Bahrain		
Al Busayss, Adil Said Al Haj Obeid	Yemen		
Al Daihani, Mohammed Fenaitel Mohamed	Kuwait	—	Repatriated November 4, 2005
Al Daini, Omer Saeed	Yemen		
Al Darbi, Ahmed	Saudi Arabia		
Al Dhabbi, Khalid Mohamed Saleh	Yemen		
Al Dhabi, Salah Mohamed Saleh	Yemen		
Al Dossary, Juma Mohammed Abdul Latif	Bahrain	—	Hunger striker; Reported to have attempted suicide during his lawyer's visit in October 2005
Al Fawzan, Fahd Fawzan	Saudi Arabia		
Al Fayfi, Jabir Jubran	Saudi Arabia		
Al Fouzan, Fahd	Saudi Arabia		
Al Ghaith, Abdurahman ba	Yemen		
Al Ghamdi, Abdur Rahman Uthman	Saudi Arabia		Repatriated to Saudi Arabia May 19, 2006
Al Ghamdi, Khalaf Awad	Saudi Arabia		
Al Ghamdi, Saeed Farhah	Saudi Arabia		
Al Ghamdi, Zaid	Saudi Arabia		
Al Ghanimi, Abdullah Muhammad Salih	Saudi Arabia		
Al Habashi, Raafat	Yemen		
Al Habayshi, Khalid Sulaymanjaydh	Saudi Arabia	—	Released in 2006.
Al Habri, Mishal Awad Sayaf	—	—	Suicide attempt left brain damage; Repatriated to Saudi custody July 20, 2005, will be confined to care facility for the duration of his life
Al Hag, Atag Al	Yemen	—	Continued detention considered by CSRT
Al Haj, Sarqawi	Yemen		
Al Hajj, Sami	Sudan	2001	Cameraman for al Jazeera, only journalist held at Gitmo, hunger-striker; Released May 1, 2008
Al Hakim, A'Del Abdu	China	2001	Determined to be innocent; Released in summer 2006.
Al Hamd, Adel Saleh	Yemen		
Al Hameydani, Khalid Bin Abdullah Mishal Thamer	—	—	Continued detention considered by CSRT
Al Hami, Rafiq Bin Bashir Bin Jalud			
Al Hamiri, Abdulah	United Arab Emirates		Repatriated on July 28, 2008.
Al Hanashi, Mohammad Ahmed Abdullah Saleh	—	—	Continued detention considered by CSRT
Al Harazi, Fahed			
Al Harbi, Ibrahim Daifullah	Saudi Arabia		
Al Harbi, Mohamed Abdullah	Saudi Arabia	—	Went through CSRT
Al Harbi, Mohamed Atiq Awayd	Saudi Arabia	—	Went through CSRT; Alleged exonerating evidence and $12,000 he was carrying when captured went missing from the secure evidence room
Al Harbi, Tariq	Saudi Arabia		
Al-Harith, Jamal Udeen	United Kingdom	—	Released March 2004
Al Hassan, Sameer Naji	Yemen		
al-Hila, Abd al-Salam Ali	Yemen	September 19, 2002	Claims to have spent 18 months in extrajudicial CIA detention; Claims to have been tortured during CIA detention
Al Hilal, Abdul Al-Salam	—	—	Continued detention considered by CSRT
Al Husayn, Zaid Muhamamd Sa Ad Al			
Al Ilmi, Muhammad	Morocco		
Al Iraqi, Abdul Hadi	—	—	Continued detention considered by CSRT
Al Jabri, Bandar Ahmad Mubarak	Saudi Arabia	late 2001	
Al Jayfi, Issam Hamid Al Bin Ali	—	—	Continued detention considered by CSRT
Al Jowfi, Rashid	Saudi Arabia		
Al Juaid, Rami Sad	Saudi Arabia		
Al Judaan, Hamood	Saudi Arabia		
Al Juhani, Badr	Saudi Arabia		
Al Juhdali, Ziyad	Saudi Arabia		
Al Jutayly, Fahd bin Salih bin Sulaiman	Saudi Arabia		Repatriated to Saudi Arabia May 19, 2006
Al Kaabi, Jamil Ali	Saudi Arabia		
al-Kahtani, Mohamed	Saudi Arabia	late 2001	Another "20th hijacker"
Al Kandari, Abdullah kamel bin Abdullah Kamal	Kuwait	—	Main allegation is wearing a Casio F91W digital watch
Al Kandari, Fayiz Mohammed Ahmed	Kuwait	—	Continued detention considered by CSRT
Al Kazimi, Ali Nasser	Yemen		
Al Khalaf, Asim	Saudi Arabia		
Al Khalaqi, Asim Thahit Abdullah	—	—	Continued detention considered by CSRT
Al Khalidi, Sulaiman	Saudi Arabia		
Al Khalifa, Shaikh Salman bin Ebrahim	Bahrain	—	Released November 5, 2005
Al Khowlani, Idrees	Saudi Arabia		
Al Kouri, Farouq Ahmed	Yemen		
Al Kinani Al Laithi, Sami	Egypt	—	Ruled innocent; Claims beating crippled him
Al Maaliki, Sad	Saudi Arabia		
Al Madhoni, Musaab	Yemen		
Al Mahdi, Ali Yahya Mahdi	Yemen		
Al Malki, Saed Khatem	Saudi Arabia		Repatriated to Saudi Arabia May 19, 2006
al-Marri, Jarallah	Qatar	—	Hunger striker; Brother of Ali Saleh Kahlah al-Marri
Al Marwallah, Bishir Nashir	Yemen	—	Continued detention considered by CSRT
Al Matari, Fahd Al Haimi	Yemen		
Al Matrafi, Abdul Aziz	—	—	Continued detention considered by CSRT
Al Morghi, Khalid Abdallah Abdel Rahman	Saudi Arabia		Repatriated to Saudi Arabia May 19, 2006
Al Mosleh, Abdullah Hamid	Saudi Arabia		
Al Mudwani, Musab Omar All	—	—	Continued detention considered by CSRT
Al Muhajiri, Abdulmajeed	Yemen		
Al Muhammad, Mahmood	Syria		
Al Mujahid, Mahmoud Abdulaziz	Yemen		Repatriated on 27 October 2021.
Al Muraqi, Khalid bin Abdullah	Saudi Arabia		
Al Murbati, Essa	Bahrain	—	Believed to be on hunger strike
Al-Murri, Khalid Rashid Ali	Saudi Arabia		Repatriated to Saudi Arabia May 19, 2006
Al Musa, Abdul Wahab	Saudi Arabia		
Al Mutairi, Khalid Abdullah Mishal	Kuwait		
Al Mutayri, Nasir Najr Nasir Balud	—	—	Continued detention considered by CSRT
Al Naimi, Abdulla Majid	Bahrain	—	Released November 5, 2005
Al Nasir, Ibrahim Muhammad	Saudi Arabia		
Al Noaimi, Abdullah ^{4}			
al-Noofayee, Abdelaziz Kareem Salim	Saudi Arabia	March 2002	Detained for wearing a Casio F91W digital watch; Repatriated to Saudi Arabia June 12, 2009
Al Nukhailan, Naif	Saudi Arabia		
Al Nur, Anwar Hamdan	Saudi Arabia		
Al Nusairi, Adil Uqla Hasan	Saudi Arabia		Repatriated to Saudi Arabia May 19, 2006
Al Odah, Fawzi Khalid Abdullah Fahad	Kuwait	Jan 2002	Claims to be a charity worker; Filed suit to have feeding tube removed
Al Omar, Wasm Awad Al Wasm	Saudi Arabia		
Al Omari, Musa bin Ali bin Saeed	Saudi Arabia		
Al Otaiba, Bandar	Saudi Arabia		
Al-Otaibi, Nawwaf Fahd Humood	Saudi Arabia	—	15 when captured; Repatriated to Saudi Arabia May 19, 2006
Al Owshan, Abdul Aziz Sad	Saudi Arabia		
Al Owshan, Saleh bin Abdullah	Saudi Arabia		
Al Owshan, Sulieman	Saudi Arabia		
Al Qaaid, Rashid	Saudi Arabia		
Al Qadasi, Khalid Massah	Yemen		
Al Qadasi, Walid	Yemen		
Al-Qahtani, Abdullah Hamid Mohammed	Saudi Arabia		Repatriated to Saudi Arabia May 19, 2006
Al Qahtani, Jaber Hasan	Saudi Arabia		
al Qahtani, Jabran Said bin	Saudi Arabia	March 2002	Charged with conspiracy to murder on November 7, 2005
Al Qahtani, Khalid Mallah Shayi Al Jilba	Saudi Arabia	—	Did not attend CSRT; Did not attend CSRT ARB
Al Qahtani, Sad	Saudi Arabia		
Al Qa'id, Rashid Abd Al Muslih Qaid	—	—	Continued detention considered by CSRT
Al Qarani, Muhammad Hamid	Chad	2001/10/21	15 when captured in Pakistan; Dictated a statement for CSRT; Said he was born in Saudi Arabia to parents who were citizens of Chad
al Qosi, Ibrahim Ahmed Mahmoud	Sudan	Dec 2001	Faces military commission
Al Qurashi, Muhammad Abdur-Rahman Abid	Saudi Arabia		
Al Quwari, Mahr Rafat	Gaza Strip		Transferred to Hungary
Al Rabahi, Abdullah Ameen	Yemen		
Al Rabeesh, Yusuf	Saudi Arabia		
Al Rabia, Fouad Mahoud Hasan	Kuwait	—	Allowed to undergo a lie detector test
Al Rahul, Ahmed Abdullah Rasan	Maldives	Nov 2002	Born in Qatar to Maldivian immigrants. Qatar denied him citizenship in 1999 and he was rumored to have fled to Pakistan shortly after. Captured 70 km NE of Kandahar.
Al Radia, Riyad Atiq Ali Abdu Al Haj	—	—	Continued detention considered by CSRT
Al Rahabi, Abdulmalik Abdulwahhab	Yemen		
Al Rahman Abd, Allal Ab Aljallil Abd ^{4}			
Al Raimi, Ali Yahya Mahdi	Yemen	—	Continued detention considered by CSRT
Al Raimi, Ismail Ali	Yemen		
Al Rawi, Bisher Amin Khalil	Iraq, UK resident	—	Captured on a business trip to Gambia; Released
Al-Razak, Hamid	Afghanistan		Court order issued on his behalf on December 1, 2006; Al Razak's name does not appear on the May 15, 2006 DoD list of Guantanamo detainees
Al Rezehi, Ali Ahmed Muhammad	Yemen	—	Continued detention considered by CSRT
Al Rushaydan, Abdallah Ibrahim	Saudi Arabia	—	Continued detention considered by CSRT; Repatriated to Saudi Arabia May 19, 2006
Al Saigh, Adnan Muhammed Ali	Saudi Arabia	—	Continued detention considered by CSRT; Repatriated to Saudi Arabia May 19, 2006
Al Salami, Ali Abdullah	Yemen		
Al Salami, Saleh Abdullah	Yemen		
Al Samh, Adil Abu	Yemen		
Al Sarim, Saeed Ahmed	Yemen		
Al Sebaii, Abdel Hadi Mohammed Badan	Saudi Arabia		Repatriated to Saudi Arabia May 19, 2006
Al Sebaii, Mohammed bin Jaied Hadi	Saudi Arabia		Repatriated to Saudi Arabia May 19, 2006
Al Sehli, Ibrahim Daif Allah Neman	Saudi Arabia	—	Repatriated to Saudi Arabia May 19, 2006
Al Shabani, Fahd Abdullah	Saudi Arabia		
Al Shahrani, Muhammad bin Abdur Rahman	Saudi Arabia		
al Shahri, Youssef	Saudi Arabia	—	15 when captured
Al Shaibani, Bandar	Saudi Arabia		
Al Shamiri, Mustafa	Yemen		
Al Shammari, Abdulaziz Sayer Owain	Kuwait	—	Repatriated November 4, 2005 to Kuwait
Al Shammari, Majid Afas Radi Al Tumi	Saudi Arabia		Repatriated to Saudi Arabia May 11, 2005
Al Shammari, Zain	Saudi Arabia		
Al Shamri, Anwar Hamdan al Noor	Saudi Arabia		
Al Shaqoori, Usamah	Morocco		
Al Shaqoori, Yunus	Morocco		Repatriated to Morocco on September 17, 2015.; Represents the first repatriation approval by Deference Secretary Ashton B. Carter.
al Sharbi, Ghassan Abdullah	Saudi Arabia	March 2002	Charged with conspiracy to murder on November 7, 2005
Al Shareef, Fahd Umar	Saudi Arabia		
Al Shareef, Sultan	Saudi Arabia		
Al Sharikh, Abdul Hadi	Saudi Arabia		
Al Sharikh, Abdur Razaq	Saudi Arabia		
Al Shayban, Said Bezan Ashek	Saudi Arabia		Repatriated to Saudi Arabia May 19, 2006
Al Shehri, Abdul Salam Mureef Ghaithan	Saudi Arabia	—	15 when captured, but not sent to Camp Iguana
Al Shehri, Saeed Ali Jabir ale Khuthaim	Saudi Arabia		
Al Shehri, Salim	Saudi Arabia		
Al Shehri, Yusuf Muhammad	Saudi Arabia		
Al Shorabi, Zohair Abdul Mohammed	—	—	Continued detention considered by CSRT; Entire CSRT dossier; Al Shorabi's name does not appear on the May 15, 2006 DoD list of Guantanamo detainees
al Shulan, Hani Abdul Muslih	Yemen		Detained for wearing a Casio F91W digital watch
Al Shumrani, Mohammad Al Rahman	Saudi Arabia	—	Continued detention considered by CSRT
Al Siblie, Abdullah Yahya Yousuf	Yemen		
Al Suadi, Abdul Aziz Adbullah Ali ^{4}	Yemen	—	Alleged to have attended both the Al Farouq and Tarnak Farms training camps
Al Suwaidi, Abdulaziz	Yemen		
Al Tamini, Abd Al Razzaq Abdallah Ibrahim	—	—	Continued detention considered by CSRT
Al Tays, Ali Husayn Abdullah	—	—	Continued detention considered by CSRT
Al Towlaqi, Fahmi	Yemen		
Al Umar, Ibrahim bin Umar	Saudi Arabia		
Al Umari, Musa Ali Said al Said	Saudi Arabia		DoD's memo summarizing the factors for and against his continued detention; Al Umari's name does not appear on the May 15, 2006 DoD list of Guantanamo detainees
Al Unzi, Abdullah Thani Faris Al Sulami	Saudi Arabia		
Al Unzi, Khalid	Saudi Arabia		
Al Unzi, Rakan	Saudi Arabia		
Al Unzi, Sultan Sari Saail	Saudi Arabia		
Al Utaibi, Bajad bin Daifillah	Saudi Arabia		
Al Utaibi, Bandar	Saudi Arabia		
Al Utaibi, Muhammad Suroor	Saudi Arabia		
Al Utaibi, Naif Fahd Al Aseemi	Saudi Arabia		
Al Utaybi, Mane Shaman Turki Al Habardi	Saudi Arabia	—	Committed suicide in cell on June 10, 2006; Identified as "Mani Shaman Turki al-Habardi Al-Utaybi" by DoD on June 11, 2006; Reported to have been issued ID number 588 and had been identified in earlier document as "Mazi Salih al Harbi"; Lawyers reported that DoD refused to forward their mail to detainee, claiming they were spelling his name incorrectly
Al Utaybi, Muhammad Surur Dakhilallah	Saudi Arabia	—	Continued detention considered by CSRT
al Uwaydah, Rashid Awad Rashid	Saudi Arabia		Repatriated to Saudi Arabia May 19, 2006
Al Wadi, Adil Kamil Abdullah ^{4}	Bahrain	late 2001	
Al Wahab, Abd al Malik Abd	Kuwait		
Al Warafi, Mukhtar Yahya Najee	Yemen	2002	Transferred to Oman in January 2016.
Al Yafii, Al Khadir Abdullah	Yemen		Transferred to Oman January 2015
Al Zahrani, Khalid	Saudi Arabia		
Al Zahrani, Sad Ibrahim Ramzi al-Jundubi	Saudi Arabia		
Al Zahrani, Yasser Talal	Saudi Arabia	—	Committed suicide in the camp on June 10, 2006
Al Zamil, Adil Zamil Abdull Mohssin	Kuwait	—	Repatriated November 4, 2005
Al Zarnuki, Mohammed Ali Salem Al Zarnuki	Yemen	—	Went through CSRT; Went through ARB
Al Zuhairi, Ahmed Zaid	Yemen		
Ali, Abu Sana	Morocco		
Ali, Sahibzada Usman	Afghanistan		
Ali, Sarfraz	Pakistan		
Ali, Syed Saim	Pakistan		
Amer, Jalal Salam Bin	Yemen	—	Unexplained name mismatch in dossier
Ameziane, Djamel Saiid Ali	Algeria, Canadian resident, French resident	—	Former resident of Canada.; Former resident of France.; On December 5, 2013 he was transferred to Algeria.
Amin, Aminullah	Pakistan		
Amin, Omar Rajab	Kuwait	—	Continued detention considered by CSRT
Amro, Jalal Salem bin	Yemen		
Anaam, Suhail Abdo	Yemen		
Ansar, Muhammad	Pakistan		
Anwar, Muhammad	Pakistan	—	released
Aouzar, Mohamed	Morocco		
Aqeel, Sulaiman bin	Yemen		
Arbaish, Khalid bin Suleiman			
Aseeri, Turki Mashawi Zayid Ale Jabali	Saudi Arabia		
Asharf, Muhammad	Pakistan		Name appears as Muhammad Ashraf on the Washington Post list of detainees.; Repatriated late 2004.; Released June 28, 2005.; Asharf's name does not appear on the May 15, 2006 DoD list of Guantanamo detainees.
Aslam, Noor	Afghanistan		
Asnar, Khalid	Jordan		
Ayub, Haseeb	Pakistan		
Ayub, Mohammed	China	—	Continued detention considered by CSRT
Aziz, Ahamed Abdel	Mauritania	2002-10-28	Transferred to Mauritania October 29, 2015
Azzam, Hussein	Jordan		
Muhammad al Ghazali Babikir	Sudan		
Badrzaman Badr	Afghanistan	—	A writer with a master's degree in English literature. At the time of his detention he was already imprisoned in Afghanistan for writing satirical articles that lampooned both the U.S. and the Taliban. Released in 2005 after 3.5 years of imprisonment by US.
Saeed Bajadiyah	Morocco, France		
Bakhtiar Bameri	Iran	2002 in Afghanistan	Repatriated September 14, 2004
Barak	Afghanistan		
Barhoumi, Sufyian	Algeria, French resident	—	charged with conspiracy to murder on November 7, 2005
Bashir, Ahmad	Pakistan	—	17 when captured, released 2005
Batarfi, Ayman Saeed	Yemen		
Bawazir, Mohammad	Yemen	—	claims authorities tortured him to make him end his hunger strike
Lutfi Bayifkan	Turkey		
Begg, Moazzam	United Kingdom	late 2001	Stripped of his ICRC POW card - released Jan 2005
Belkacem, Bensayah	Bosnia	January 17, 2002	Captured in Bosnia following his acquittal by the Bosnian Supreme Court; One of the Algerian Six
Belmar, Richard	United Kingdom	—	Went to Afghanistan to flee UK law - released Jan 2005
Benchellali, Mourad	France	—	Brother of Menad Benchellali - "the chemist" - released
Bin Attash, Hassin	Yemen	—	17 when captured
Muhammad Binmoojan	Morocco		
(Guantanamo ID 960)	Afghanistan	—	Released prior to the initiation of the CSRT procedures
(Guantanamo ID 639)	Afghanistan	—	Released prior to the initiation of the CSRT procedures
(Guantanamo ID 658)	Afghanistan	—	Released on March 25, 2003.
(Guantanamo ID 968)	Afghanistan	—	Attended both his CSRT and ARB hearing.
Borekzai, Moheb Ullah	Afghanistan	—	Released July 18, 2005.; reported the July 2005 hunger strike
Boumediene, Lakhdar	Bosnia	January 17, 2002	Captured in Bosnia following his acquittal by the Bosnian Supreme Court; One of the Algerian Six
Brahim Benchakaroun	Morocco		
Bukhary, Abdul Hakim	Saudi Arabia	—	Continued detention considered by a CSRT
Chaman, Nazargul	Afghanistan	—	Continued detention considered by a CSRT
Abdullah Celik	Turkey		
Yuksel Celikgogus	Turkey		
Redouan Chekkouri	Morocco, France	—	repatriated in 2004 - released on bail - then rearrested
Dourad, Gouled Hassan	Somalia	2004	Dourad's name does not appear on the May 15, 2006 DoD list of Guantanamo detainees.
Sabri Mohammed Ebrahim			
El Hajj, Boudella	Bosnia	January 17, 2002	Captured following his acquittal by the Bosnian Supreme Court; One of the Algerian Six
Qari Esmhatulla	Afghanistan	—	Testified he was under 16 when captured; Testified he was sold by bounty hunters; Testified he had no association with terrorism
Farooq, Muhammad Naim	Afghanistan		
Fauzee, Ibrahim	Maldives		
Fazil, Mullah	Afghanistan		
Feroze, Muhammad	Morocco		
Fiz, Mohammed Hagi	Afghanistan	—	One of the first four detainees to be released.; Released October 2002.; Newspaper reports described him as frail and senile.; Claimed to be over one hundred years old.
Fouzan, Fahed	Saudi Arabia		
Ghailani, Ahmed Khalfan	Tanzania		Transferred to ADX Florence and then into USP McCreary. Serving a life sentence.
Ghaffar, Maulvi Abdul	Afghanistan	—	Released from Guantanamo in January 2004.; following his release, he subsequently fought with the Taliban and was killed in Afghanistan by coalition forces on September 26, 2004.; Ghaffar's name does not appear on the May 15, 2006 DoD list of Guantanamo detainees.
Ghafour, Abdul	Afghanistan	—	Continued detention considered by a CSRT
Ghanem, Mohamed Ragab Abu	Yemen		
Ghazi, Fahd Abdullah Ahmad	Saudi Arabia		
Gherebi, Falen	Libya		
Ghereby, Salem Abdul Salem ^{4}			
Ghezali, Mehdi Muhammed	Sweden	Dec. 2001	Captured in the Tora Bora Mountains, released July 8, 2004
Ghulab, Sher	Afghanistan		
Gul, Awal	Afghanistan	—	Acknowledged being a member of the Taliban.; Told his CSRT he had submitted several written resignations, that had not been accepted.
Gul, Lall	Afghanistan		
Gul, Nate	Afghanistan		
Gumarov, Ravil	Russia	—	Repatriated January 3, 2004.; Convicted of bombing a natural gas pipeline.
Habib, Mamdouh	Egypt & Australia	late 2001	Now released, allegedly bears scars of torture
Hafez, Khalil Rahman	Pakistan	—	Continued detention considered by CSRT
Hamada, Mohamed	Yemen		
Hamdan, Salim Ahmed	Yemen	—	released to Yemen in 2008, conviction vacated in 2012
Hamdi, Yasir Esam	United States & Saudi	late 2001	US citizen, moved to brig on mainland; expatriated to Saudi Arabia and stripped of US citizenship
Hamdoon, Zahir Omar bin	Yemen		
Hamidullah	Afghanistan	—	Continued detention considered by a CSRT
Hamlily, Mustafa Ahmed	Algeria	—	Continued detention considered by a CSRT
Hamza, Abu	Saudi Arabia		
Hanif, Muhammad	Pakistan		
Hassan, Imad Abdullah	Yemen	—	Says he was a University student, captured in his University dorm, who had never even been to Afghanistan
Hassan, Mohammad Mohammad	Yemen		
Hatair, Khalid			
Hatem, Saeed	Yemen		
Hicks, David	Australia	late 2001	Convicted (plea bargain). Transferred to Australian Detention. Came from Adelaide, Australia.
Hkimi, Adel	Tunisia		
Houari, Abdul Rahim (aka Haderbache, Sofiane)	Algeria	—	Continued detention considered by a CSRT; On March 3, 2006 the DoD released a memo summarizing the factors for and against his continued detention, prepared for his Administrative Review Board hearing.
Idir, Mustafa Ait ^{4}	Bosnia	January 17, 2002	Captured in Bosnia not "on the battlefield"; Apprehended after being acquitted by the Bosnian Supreme Court
Iilyas, Muhammad	Pakistan		
Ikassrien, Lahcen	Morocco	-	extradited to Spain July 2005
Iqbal, Asif	United Kingdom	2001	released March 2004—alleges abuse
Iqbal, Faiq	Pakistan	—	released
Iqbal, Zafar	Pakistan		
Irfan, Muhammad	Pakistan		
Ishaq, Muhammad	Pakistan	—	released
Ishmuradov, Timur	Russia		
Ismail, Sadeq Muhammad Sa'id	Yemen	—	Alleged to have been trained at the Al Farouq training camp.
Ismail, Yasin Qasem Mohammad	Yemen	—	Claimed torture
Jabarah, Mohammed	Canada		Transferred to ADX Florence. Serving a life sentence.
Jamaluddin, Muhammad	Pakistan	—	released
Jan, Aziaullah	Pakistan		
Jarabh, Saeed Ahmed Mohammed Abdullab Sarem ^{4}	—	—	
Joaid, Abdul Rahman	Saudi Arabia		
Kabir, Usama Hassan Ahmend Abu	Jordan	—	Continued detention considered by a CSRT
Kahm, Abdul Rahman Abdullah Mohamed Juma	Afghanistan	—	Continued detention considered by a CSRT
Kanouni, Imad	France	—	Released
Khadr Abdurahman	Canada	late 2001	claims to have been a CIA mole - released
Khadr, Omar	Canada	2002/7/27	Captured at age 15 following a fire fight between insurgents and US military during which a soldier was killed. Charged with war crimes, which are contentious based on the laws of war. He was transferred to Canada on 29 September 2012 to serve for his sentence.
Khairkhwa, Khairullah	Afghanistan	—	Former spokesman to the BBC and VOA; Former Governor of Herat
Khamix, Karama	Yemen	—	As of December 30, 2005 faces trial in Yemen; Released, after three years detention, when US authorities decided he was not tied to al Qaeda
Khan, Abdullah	—	—	US Government withheld the first five pages of the transcript of his Combatant Status Review Tribunal
Khan, Alif	Afghanistan		
Khan, Aziz	Afghanistan		
Khan, Aziz	Pakistan		
Khan, Badshah	Pakistan		
Khan, Ejaz Ahmad	Pakistan	—	released
Khan, Haji Mohammed	Afghanistan		
Khan, Hamood ullah	Pakistan		
Khan, Isa	Pakistan		
Khan, Juma	Afghanistan		
Khan, Merza	Afghanistan		
Khan, Muhammad Ejaz	Pakistan	—	Repatriated late 2004; Released June 28, 2005; Khan's name does not appear on the May 15, 2006 DoD list of Guantanamo detainees
Khan, Muhammad Kashif	Pakistan		
Khan, Nasrat	Afghanistan	—	Continued detention considered by his CSRT and ARB
Khan, Tariq Aziz	Pakistan	—	released
Khasraf, Mohamed Nasser Yahya Abdullah	Yemen		
Kifayatullah	Pakistan		
Kiyemba, Jamal	Uganda, UK resident	—	hunger striker, released in 2006 after Kiyemba v. Bush and all Uyghur detainees at Guantanamo Bay had been released by 2013.
Koochi, Naeem	Afghanistan		
Kudayev, Rasul	Russia	—	Continued detention considered by a CSRT
Kurnaz, Murat	Turkey, German resident	—	dossier accidentally declassified - released
Lagah, Lofti Ben Suihi	Tunisia		
Lahmar, Mahfouz Sabir	Algeria, France	—	Arrested in his home in Bosnia
Madni, Hafez Qari Mohamed Saad Iqbal	Pakistan	—	Continued detention considered by a CSRT
Mahdi, Fawaz Naman Hamoud Abdullah	Saudi Arabia	Afghanistan, 2001	Acknowledged to be seriously mentally ill.
Arkin Mahmud	China	—	Uyghur, released to Switzerland March 23, 2010
Mamut, Bahtiyar	China	—	Uyghur
Maimoundi, Hassan			
Mamrouk, Adel Ben Hamida	Tunisia		
Mamut, Abdul Helil	China	—	Uyghur
Jamal Muhammad Alawi Mar'i	Yemen	—	US alleges the charities he worked for had ties to al Qaeda
Manzoor, Hafiz Liaqat	*Pakistan	—	released
Maqrum, Murtada Ali Said	Saudi Arabia	—	On March 3, 2006 the DoD released a memo summarizing the factors for and against his continued detention, prepared for his Administrative Review Board hearing. Murtada's name did not appear on the May 15, 2006 DoD list of Guantanamo detainees.
Marouz, Muhammad	Morocco		
Matin, Abdul			
Maula, Abdul	Pakistan	—	released
Mazloom, Fazel	Afghanistan		
Mazrou, Alaa Abdel Maqsoud	Egypt		
Mehmood, Majid	Pakistan	—	released
Mehmood, Talli	Pakistan	—	released
Mehsud, Abdullah	Afghanistan	Dec 2001	one of the first detainees to be released.; returned to a senior Taliban leadership role; was killed on July 24, 2007 in Pakistan.
Mert, Nuri	Turkey		
Meshad, Sherif	Egypt		
Mingazov, Ravil	Russia		
Mohammed	Afghanistan		
Mohammed, Alif	Afghanistan	February 10, 2003	Alleged follower of Abdul Wahid, captured following an ambush outside of Lejay, Afghanistan.
Mohammed, Benyam	Ethiopia, UK resident	—	released
Mohammed, Hajii Faiz	Afghanistan		
Mohammed, Jan	Afghanistan		Released in October 2002.
Mohammed, Nag	China	—	Uyghur
Mohammed, Said	Afghanistan	—	Continued detention considered by a CSRT
Mohammed, Wazir	Afghanistan		
Mubanga, Martin	Zambia and U.K.		Released Jan 2005
Muhammad, Ali	Pakistan		
Muhammad, Mirza	Afghanistan		
Muhammad, Shah	Pakistan	—	Released May 8, 2003.
Muhebullah	Afghanistan	—	Continued detention considered by a CSRT
Mujarrad, Talal Ahmed Mohamed	Yemen		
Murshid, Ayoub	Yemen		
Musaid, Mazin Salih			
Muslimdost, Abdul Rahim	Pakistan		
Mustafa, Khaled ben	France	—	released
Nabaytah, Hassan	Jordan		
Nabiyev, Yusuf	Tajikistan		
Naqibullah	Afghanistan		Arrested at the age of 13; One of the three minors held at Camp Iguana.; Released on January 28, 2004.; The DoD's official list, of May 15, 2006, listed a minor named Naqib Ullah. It is unclear whether these two names refer to the same individual.
Naseer, Muneer bin	Pakistan		
Nasir, Abdul Latif	Morocco	May 13, 2002	Released on July 19, 2021
Nasri, Riadh Mohammad	Tunisia		
Nauman, Muhammad	Pakistan		
Nechle, Mohammed	Bosnia	January 17, 2002	Captured following his acquittal by the Bosnian Supreme Court; One of the Algerian Six
Noor, Yusuf Khaleel	Saudi Arabia		
Noorallah	Afghanistan		
Noori, Adel	China		Continued detention considered by a CSRT
Noori, Norullah	Afghanistan		Continued detention considered by a CSRT
Obaidullah	Afghanistan	July 2002	Repatriated to Afghanistan on December 23, 2019.
Odigov, Ruslan	Russia		
Omar, Muhammad	Pakistan		
Omar, Othman Ali	Yemen		
Osman, Haji	Afghanistan		
Osman, Mohammad	Afghanistan		
Paracha, Saifullah	Pakistan		
Hozaifa Parhat	China	—	Uyghur released
Patel, Mustaq Ali	France	Afghanistan	Also known as Muhammed Haji, among other aliases; Transferred to French custody, March 7, 2005; One of 38 Guantanamo detainees determined to be No longer enemy combatant by Combatant Status Review Tribunal
Qaid, Yaseem	Yemen		
Qassim, Abu Bakker	China	2001	Detained in Camp Iguana, since 2002, as "enemy combatant;" CSRT ruled him "no longer enemy combatant" in 2004. Held pending country to accept him, due to him opposing return to China for fear of torture. Denied entry and asylum to U.S. under the INA, denied habeas corpus.
Qassim, Khalid Ahmed	Yemen	—	Reported being tortured in Guantanamo.
Qudus, Abdul	Afghanistan	2001	Was 14 years old when captured. Claimed to be sold for a bounty. Released.
Quraish, Nasr Abdullah	Yemen		
Rabeii, Salman Yahya Hassan Mohammed ^{4}			
Rafiq, Muhammad	Pakistan		
Rahim, Abdul	Pakistan		
Rahim, Abdur	Afghanistan		
Rjkarl	Egypt		
Rahman, Asadullah Abdul	Afghanistan	late 2001	Believed between 12 and 15 years old when detained.; One of the three minors held at Camp Iguana.; Released on January 28, 2004.; The DoD's official prisoner list of May 15, 2006 listed a minor named Assad Ullah. It is unclear whether these two names refer to the same individual.
Rahman, Saji Ur	Pakistan	late 2001	Sajin Urayman was repatriated on 16 July 2003.
Rahmatoulah	Afghanistan		
Raouf, Mullah Abdel	Afghanistan		
Rashid, Hani Saleh	Yemen		
Rasul, Shafiq	United Kingdom	—	released March 2004, 3 months before Rasul v. Bush was decided. Alleges abuse.
Raza, Abid	Pakistan		
Raza, Muhammad Arshad	Pakistan		
Razaq, Abdul/Abdur	Pakistan	—	released
Razeq, Abdul	Afghanistan		
Rehman, Abdul	Afghanistan		
Rehman, Abdul	Pakistan		
Rehman, Hafiz Khalil ur	Pakistan		Repatriated late 2004.; Released June 28, 2005.; Rehman's name does not appear on the May 15, 2006 DoD list of Guantanamo detainees.
Rehman, Sajid-ur	Pakistan		
Ridha, Yazidi	Tunisia, France		Repatriated to Tunisia in 2024.
Ridouane, Khalid	France	—	released
Ruhani, Gholam		—	released in 2007
Russol, Habir	Afghanistan	—	Released July 18, 2005.; revealed the July 2005 hunger strike.; Russol's name does not appear on the May 15, 2006 DoD list of Guantanamo detainees.
Rustam	Afghanistan		
Sadiq, Mohammed	Afghanistan	—	Released October 2002
Saeed, Hafiz Ihsan	Pakistan		
Saeed, Muhammad	Pakistan		
Safeesi, Abdul Sattar	Pakistan		
Sagheer, Muhammad	Pakistan	—	Released October 2002.
Said, Hassan Mujamma Rabai (aka Bashir, Ghallab)	Algeria, French resident	—	On March 3, 2006 the DoD released a memo summarizing the factors for and against his continued detention, prepared for his Administrative Review Board hearing.
Salahuddin, Ghazi	Pakistan	—	released July 2003
Salman, Mohamed bin	Yemen		
Sarajudim	Afghanistan		
Sassi, Mohammed Ben Sala	Tunisia		
Sassi, Nizar	France	2002	repatriated July 27, 2004
Sattar, Abdul	Pakistan		
Saud, Abu	Saudi Arabia		
Sen, Ibrahim	Turkey		
Sen, Mesut	Turkey		
Shaalan, Hani Abdo Muslih	Yemen		
Shah, Nahir	Afghanistan	—	Participated in his CSRT
Shah, Rostum	Afghanistan		
Shah, Sliman	Afghanistan		
Shah, Sulaiman	Afghanistan		
Shah, Syed Zia Hussain	Pakistan		
Shalabi, Abdul Rahman	Saudi Arabia	2002-01-11	transferred September 22, 2015
Sharbat	Afghanistan	—	Participated in his CSRT
Sharifullah	Afghanistan	—	Participated in his CSRT
Shaqroon, Ibrahim bin	Morocco		
Sharofov, Rukmiddin	Tajikistan		
Shehzada, Mullah	Afghanistan		
Shokuri, Yunis Abdurrahman	Morocco	2002-05-01	transferred September 16, 2015
Sidiq, Mohammed	Afghanistan		
Polad Sabir Sirajov	Azerbaijan		
Slahi, Mohamedou Ould	Mauritania	—	Captured in Mauritania; Radical imam, an alleged mentor to the Hamburg cell; Held without charge for 7 years after an order from United States Federal judge for his release; Has never participated in a proven crime against the United States; Released Oct 17, 2016.
Sliti, Hisham	Tunisia, France	—	hunger striker; claimed interrogator beat him on 2005/08/05
Suleiman, Fayiz Ahmad Yahia	Yemen	Late 2001	released to Italy on July 10, 2016
Sultan, Zahid	Pakistan		
Tabarak, Abdallah	Morocco	—	repatriated in 2004 - at large on bail
Tahir, Mohammad	Afghanistan		
Tariq, Muhammad	Pakistan		
Turkistani, Saddiq Ahmad	—	2001	Born in Saudi Arabia to ethnic Uyghur citizens of China resident in Saudi Arabia. Nationality unclear.; Captured by the Taliban in 1997; Freed from Taliban imprisonment during the Invasion; Re-captured by the Americans; CSRT concluded, in 2005, that he was innocent; Transferred from Guantanamo to Saudi Arabia on June 25, 2005.
Ullah, Asad	Afghanistan		
Utain, Riyad	Yemen		
Uthman, Uthman Abdul Rahim Mohammad	Yemen	—	Alleged to have trained at Tarnak Farms.
Uyar, Salih	Turkey		Continued detention supposedly justified because he was captured wearing a Casio F91W digital watch.
Uzel, Turgut	Turkey		
Vohidov, Muqim	Tajikistan		
Von Ahmed, Ahmed	Azerbaijan		
Wali, Badshah	Afghanistan		
Wali, Jehan	Pakistan	—	Released May 8, 2003.
Wali, Mohammed	Afghanistan		
Wazeer, Abdullah ba	Yemen		
Wazim	Saudi Arabia	—	Participated in his CSRT
Wazir, Abdullah	Afghanistan	—	Participated in his CSRT
Wazir, Mohammed	Afghanistan		
Yadel, Brahim	France		
Yar, Hiztullah Nasrat	Afghanistan	—	Son of Nasrat Khan
Yaqub, Ahmad Muhamman	China	—	Uyghur
Zaeef, Mohammed	Afghanistan		
Zaeef, Mullah Abdul Salam	Afghanistan	—	former Taliban ambassador to Pakistan; released September 2005
Zahir, Abdul	Afghanistan	—	charged by the Guantanamo military commissions
Zaman, Badar uz	Pakistan		
Zaman, Qaisir	Pakistan	—	released
Zemiri, Ahcene	Algeria, France	—	
Zemmori, Mosa Zi	Belgium	—	Detained, in part, because he was captured wearing a Casio digital watch; released

== See also ==
- Habeas corpus petitions of Guantanamo Bay detainees
- A Profile of 517 Detainees through Analysis of Department of Defense Data
- Faisalabad Three

=== Guantanamo detainees by nationality ===
- Afghan detainees at Guantanamo Bay
- Bahraini detainees at Guantanamo Bay
- Bosnian detainees at Guantanamo Bay
- British detainees at Guantanamo Bay
- Danish detainees at Guantanamo Bay
- Egyptian detainees at Guantanamo Bay
- French detainees at Guantanamo Bay
- Indonesian detainees at Guantanamo Bay
- Iraqi detainees at Guantanamo Bay
- Kazakhstani detainees at Guantanamo Bay
- Kuwaiti detainees at Guantanamo Bay
- Libyan detainees at Guantanamo Bay
- Moroccan detainees at Guantanamo Bay
- Pakistani detainees at Guantanamo Bay
- Russian detainees at Guantanamo Bay
- Saudi detainees at Guantanamo Bay
- Sudanese detainees at Guantanamo Bay
- Swedish detainees at Guantanamo Bay
- Syrian detainees at Guantanamo Bay
- Tajik detainees at Guantanamo Bay
- Tunisian detainees at Guantanamo Bay
- Uyghur detainees at Guantanamo Bay
- Uzbekistani detainees at Guantanamo Bay
- Yemeni detainees at Guantanamo Bay
