= List of French detainees at Guantanamo Bay =

The United States Department of Defense held seven French detainees in Guantanamo. All of those French detainees were released from the Guantanamo Bay Detention Camp by 2005.

A total of 778 detainees have been held in extrajudicial detention in the Guantanamo detention camps, in Cuba since the camps opened on January 11, 2002. The camp population peaked in 2004 at approximately 660. Only nineteen new detainees, all "high value detainees" have been transferred there since the United States Supreme Court's ruling in Rasul v. Bush. As of January 6, 2025, 15 detainees remain at Guantanamo Bay.

The last French citizens were repatriated in March 2005. Six of the men faced charges in France upon repatriation. Five of the men were convicted. Their convictions were overturned, on appeal, in February 2009. On February 17, 2010, the Court of Cassation, the highest court in France, ordered a re-trial of the five men.

== French detainees in Guantanamo ==
French detainees in Guantanamo
isn	name	notes
161	Mourad Benchellali	Published a book on his experience.; Claims he was misled into traveling to Afghanistan by his older brother Menad Benchellali.; Acknowledges spending two months in a military training camp in Afghanistan, just prior al Qaeda's attacks on September 11, 2001.; Claims he tried to leave Afghanistan; claims he never engaged in hostilities.; Convicted of terrorism related offenses, and received a four-year sentence.; Conviction overturned on appeal on February 24, 2009.
164	Imad Achab Kanouni	
173	Ridouane Khalid	Convicted of terrorism related offenses in a French court upon his repatriation.; Conviction overturned on appeal on February 24, 2009.
236	Khaled ben Mustafa	Convicted of terrorism related offenses in a French court upon his repatriation.; Conviction overturned on appeal on February 24, 2009.
325	Nizar Sassi	Also alleged to have been tricked into traveling to Afghanistan by Menad Benchellali.; Convicted of terrorism related offenses in a French court upon his repatriation.; Conviction overturned on appeal on February 24, 2009.
371	Brahim Yadel	Convicted of terrorism related offenses in a French court upon his repatriation.; Conviction overturned on appeal on February 24, 2009.
649	Mustaq Ali Patel	Allegedly provided a false identity to his interrogators.; Allegedly initially identified himself as a Saudi.; Denied all the allegations against him.; Reported being tortured, to force him to falsely confess to being a Saudi.; Saudi security officials visiting Guantanamo confirmed he was not a Saudi.; His CSR Tribunal determined he had never been an "enemy combatant" after all.
