= 2003 Lejay firefight =

Afghanistan gunfight

Coordinates: 33.15°N 65.133°E

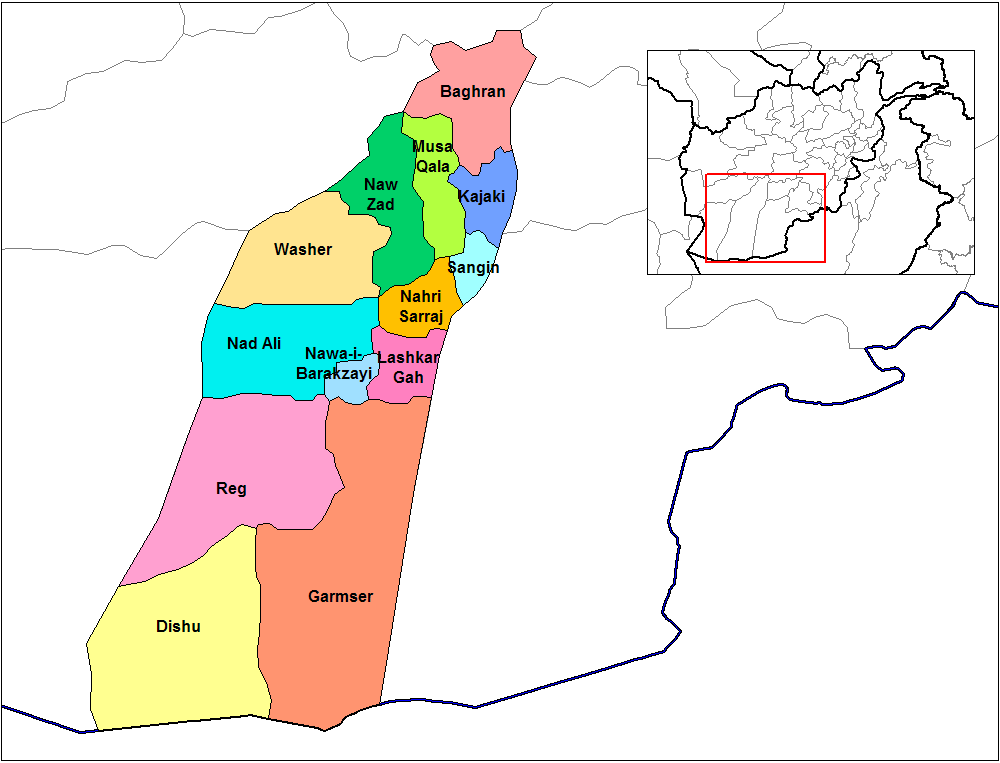
Lejay is located in the Baghran valley, in Helmand Province.

A skirmish occurred on the morning of February 10, 2003 outside Lejay, a small village in the northern, mountainous part of Helmand Province, Afghanistan. The village is in the Baghran valley, and one of the few highways in Afghanistan passes through it. American intelligence analysts assert that the village is the focus of the opium trade.

Vehicles approaching the village report being fired on. In response American forces mobilized hundreds of troops to comb the country surrounding the village in Operation Eagle Fury. The Operation mobilized dozens of coalition warplanes.

== Differing accounts of the skirmish ==
Colonel Roger King, a Department of Defense spokesman in Bagram offered daily briefings on the initial skirmish, and the on Eagle Fury.

In 2004 the Summary of Evidence memos prepared for the Combatant Status Review Tribunals of the captives apprehended following the initial shooting incident offered a different account.

=== Colonel King's 2003 account ===
According to Colonel King:

- An ambush occurred around dawn on February 10, 2003.
- American forces saw five shooters, who retreated into nearby caves, when the forces on the ground called in air support.

The Summary of Evidence memos prepared for the villagers who were sent to Guantanamo, on the other hand:

- Said that the American vehicles were fired on at around 10:30 am.
- That American forces saw the shooters escape in a white car.
- That the American forces were not on a routine patrol, that they had set out to capture warlord Raes Abdul Wahed, described as the Taliban District Commander.
