= Ameziane =

Ameziane is a surname. Notable people with the surname include:

- Ahmed Ameziane, Moroccan politician
- Djamel Ameziane (born 1967), Algerian citizen detained by the U.S. at Guantanamo Bay
- Mohammed Ameziane (c. 1859–1912), Moroccan resistance leader
