= List of Algerian detainees at Guantanamo Bay =

The United States Department of Defense acknowledges holding approximately one dozen Algerian detainees in Guantanamo. However an Algerian government press release, on August 21, 2016, said that they had been tracking 28 Algerian captives. Both US and Algerian governments agreed just two captives remained in US custody.

A total of 778 detainees have been held in the Guantanamo Bay detention camps, in Cuba since the camps opened on January 11, 2002.

The camp population peaked in early 2004 at approximately 660 before numerous detainees were released. Only nineteen new captives, all "high value detainees," have been transferred there since the United States Supreme Court's ruling in Rasul v. Bush (2004), which said that detainees had the habeas corpus right to challenge their detention before an impartial tribunal. As of January 6, 2025, 15 detainees remain at Guantanamo Bay.

On March 3, 2008, an Algerian delegation visited Guantanamo. At that time DOD reported seventeen Algerian nationals remaining in Guantanamo.

== Release negotiations ==
On June 23, 2008, the Algerian newspaper El Khabar quoted Farouk Ksentini, the head of Algeria's Advisory Human Rights Commission, about negotiations over the Guantanamo detainees' repatriation. According to Al Khabar, Ksentini reported that the US had insisted on unacceptable conditions unacceptable to Algeria for transfer of the detainees to their country of origin. The article stated that Sandra Hodgkinson, Deputy Assistant Secretary of Defense for Detainee Affairs, had not been telling "the entire truth".

The Department of Defense announced on July 2, 2008, that it had repatriated two Algerians. The department withheld the Algerians' identities without explanation.

On July 3, 2008 Carol Rosenberg of the Miami Herald reported that the two repatriated Algerians were Mustafa Hamlily and Abdul Raham Hourari.

The Department of Defense announced on August 30, 2013, that it had repatriated two additional Algerians, who were identified as Nabil Hadjarab and Mutij Sayyab. This would bring the total number of remaining detainees at Guantanamo to 164.

== Algerian detainees in Guantanamo ==
isn	name	arrival date	departure date	notes	
70	Abdul Rahim Houari	2002-02-08	2008-07-02	Allegedly trained at an Afghan military camp.; Repatriated on July 2, 2008.	
175	Hassan Mujamma Rabai Said	2002-05-01	2009-01-17	Allegedly named on a list of persons associated with a senior al Qaeda member," from captured hard drives.; Allegedly "attended the Al Farouq training camp."; Allegedly an "Osama bin Laden bodyguard".; Allegedly captured with thirty other Arabs on December 15, 2001.; Allegedly served as a supply clerk in Tora Bora.; Allegedly named on multiple suspicious lists.; Held in Guantanamo as of November 25, 2008.	Allegedly attended the Finsbury Park Mosque in London, United Kingdom. Allegedly stayed at Zacharia's house in Jalalabad in 2001. Zacharia allegedly gave him a rifle for self-defense. Allegedly met someone who planned to set off a radiological bomb in the USA. Denied receiving military training in Afghanistan. Denied knowing anyone in Al Qaida. Denied engaging in any hostilities. Denied knowing Afghanistan was a haven for terrorists. Still held in Guantanamo.as of August 10, 2013. On hunger strike, as of August 2013 Transferred to Algeria on August 29, 2013.
284	Mohammed 'Abd Al Qadir	2002-01-21	2008-08-25	Allegedly trained at an Afghan military camp.; Allegedly stayed at a suspect guest house.; Allegedly a member of suspect groups.; Repatriated on August 26, 2008.; Repatriated on August 25, 2008.	
288	Mutij Sadiz Ahmad Sayab	2002-01-21	2013-08-28	Allegedly stayed at suspect guest houses.; Arrested after fleeing to Pakistan two weeks after 9–11.; Allegedly knew about the attacks of 9–11.; Still held in Guantanamo as of November 25, 2008.; Transferred to Algeria on August 29, 2013.	
290	Ahmed Bin Saleh Bel Bacha	2002-02-09	2014-03-13	Allegedly attended the Finsbury Park Mosque in London United Kingdom.; Allegedly stayed at suspect guest house.; Allegedly stayed with al Qaeda leaders in Afghanistan.; Allegedly met Osama bin Laden.; Repatriated on March 13, 2014.	
292	Abdulli Feghoul	2002-02-15	2008-08-25	Repatriated on August 26, 2008.	
310	Djamel Ameziane	2002-02-12	2013-12-05	Allegedly worshipped at suspicious mosques in Montreal.; Allegedly stayed at suspect guest houses in Afghanistan.; Allegedly traveled through Tora Bora during the American aerial bombardment of Afghanistan.; Allegedly present when other detainees attempted to escape after a bush crash.; Repatriated on 2013-12-05.	
311	Farhi Saeed bin Mohammed	2002-02-11		Tribunal panel 15 convened on both 21 October 2004 and 27 October 2004, and confirmed Saiid Farhi's "enemy combatant" status in his absence.; Lived in Europe during the 1990s.; Allegedly trained at an Afghanistan military camp.; Testified that he traveled to Afghanistan in mid-2001 solely to get married. Testified that he had never heard of al Qaeda prior to its attacks on 9–11.; Traveled on a stolen passport.; Passed by, and stopped at a funeral that might have been attended by Osama bin Laden.; Still held in Guantanamo as of November 25, 2008.	
533	Hassan Zumiri	2002-05-01	2010-01-20	Allegedly traveled on a stolen passport.; Loaned Ahmed Ressam $3,500 and a video camera, prior to his attempt to bomb Los Angeles Airport.; Allegedly engaged in bank fraud during the five years he spent in Canada.	
659	Sameur Abdenour	2002-06-16	2007-12-19	Allegedly trained at an Afghan military camp.; Testified he was a legal resident of the United Kingdom, and that he had traveled legally to Afghanistan.; Returned to the UK along with three other legal residents on December 19, 2007. He was questioned and released without charges the next day.	
694	Sufyian Barhoumi	2002-06-18	2022-04-02	Faces charges before a Guantanamo military commission.; Captured in the same Faisalabad safe house as four other detainees who faced charges before a Guantanamo military commission.; Alleged to be a bomb-maker, allegedly trained others in how to make bombs.; Allegedly trained at Afghan military camps.; Lost fingers during an explosion. He says he lost his finger being trained to clear land mines. US intelligence claims he lost his fingers when receiving military training.; Attended his Tribunal with his legs in bandages, told his Tribunal his wounds were the result of abuse at Guantanamo.; Denied allegations he planned to plant bombs in the USA.	
703	Ahmed bin Kadr Labed	2002-08-05	2008-11-10	Allegedly trained at an Afghan military training camp.; Captured in safe house in Faisalabad with five other men who were to face charges before a Guantanamo military camp.; Allegedly served on the front line.; Allegedly spent most of the 1990s supporting himself with petty crime in Europe.; Ahmed claimed he traveled to Afghanistan to buy drugs.; Confirmed serving on the third, support line when the Taliban faced the Northern Alliance, in late 2001.; Alleged to have been smuggled from Afghanistan to Pakistan in December 2001 with José Padilla, and to have had knowledge of the dirty bomb that American counter-terrorism resources had once believed Padilla had been involved with.	
705	Mustafa Ahmed Hamlily	2002-08-05	2008-07-02	Worked for charities that were suspected of ties to al Qaeda.; Testified he spent ten years as a humanitarian aid worker in Pakistan.; Repatriated on July 2, 2008.	
718	Fethi Boucetta	2002-08-05	2006-11-17	Arrested in the Pakistani refugee camp where he both lived and worked.; Had never been to Afghanistan, and denied any ties to terrorism.; Determined never to have been an enemy combatant after all.; Transferred to a refugee camp in Albania on November 17, 2006.	
744	Aziz Abdul Naji	2002-08-05	2010-07-20	Won his habeas corpus.; Transferred to Algeria against his will.	
939	Mammar Ameur	2003-03-23	2008-10-06	Allegedly captured in a "safe house".; Worked for a charity alleged to have an association with a terrorist group.; His Personal Representative refused to leave copies of the OARDEC documents he was required to provide to him in violation of rules for conducting Tribunals.; The testimony of the witness he requested was ruled "not reasonably available".; Testified he was captured in his family home, not a safe house.; Testified that the allegation presented to his Tribunal were all false, and that some were brand new—allegations that had never been asked during his many interrogations.; Repatriated on 2008 October 8.	
1016	Soufian Abar Huwari	2003-05-09	2008-10-06		
1452	Adil Hadi bin Hamlili		2010-01-20		

== Algerian Six ==
Guantanamo also contains six citizens of Bosnia and Herzegovina who were born in Algeria, who are known as the "Algerian Six".

== Repatriation ==
The Department of Defense has acknowledged repatriating seven Algerians: Abdul Raham Houari, Mohammed Abd Al Al Qadir, Sameur Abdenour, Mustafa Ahmed Hamlily, Fethi Boucetta, Mammar Ameur, and Soufian Abar Huwari. The Department of Defense didn't reveal the men's names.

On April 3, 2009, at the G20 Summit in Strasbourg, French President Nicolai Sarkozy indicated France would offer asylum to a former Guantanamo detainee.
