= Lejay =

Lejay may refer to:

== Places ==
- Lejay, Afghanistan
  - site of 2003 Lejay firefight
- Base école Général Lejay, military base at Le Luc – Le Cannet Airport

== People ==
French family name, including:

- Guy Michel Lejay (1588–1674), French advocate at the French parliament, compiler of Lejay's Polyglott Bible
- Paul Lejay (1861–1920), Latinist, member of Académie des Inscriptions et Belles-Lettres.
- fr:Pierre Lejay (1898–1958), French Jesuit and physician
- Jim LeJay in 1977 NFL draft for Louis Cardinals

== Others ==
- Lejay, a French brand of crème de cassis
