= Nusrat Khan =

Nusrat Khan may refer to:

- Nusrat Khan Jalesari (died 1301), a general and nobleman from medieval India
- Nasir-ud-din Nusrat Shah Tughluq (r. 1394-1398), medieval Indian ruler
- Nasrat Khan (b. 1926), a Guantanamo detainee
- Nusrat Fateh Ali Khan (1948–1997), Pakistani musician
