= Hervé Djamel Loiseau =

French soldier

- ID photo of Loiseau
- Born: March 21, 1973; 12th arrondissement, Paris, France
- Died: ≈ December 2001; Tora Bora
- Resting place: Pakistan
- Known for: Being a Frenchman who fought for Al-Qaeda in Afghanistan

Hervé Djamel Loiseau (21 March 1973 – December 2001) was a French citizen who attended Afghan training camps, and was found dead of hunger and cold in the aftermath of the Battle of Tora Bora in December 2001, the first confirmation that Frenchmen had joined the ranks of Osama bin Laden in the wake of the 9/11 attacks.

== Early and Later life ==
Hervé Djamel Loiseau, was born on March 21st, 1973 in the 12th arrondissement of Paris to a French mother and an Algerian father. At age 5, he moved to the 10th arrondissement in Paris with his father living a relatively normal childhood. Then at age 12, he left Paris and moved to his father's hometown in Kabylia, Algeria before moving back to France and meeting Brahim Yadel at the radical Omar Mosque in Paris later on. He would end up accompanying Brahim Yadel to Lahore, Pakistan and on March 11th, 2000, the pair crossed the border into Eastern Afghanistan after the urging of Islamist recruiter Karim Bourti. He also maintained contact with the Algerian Meroine Berrahal during his time in Pakistan and Afghanistan.

== Death ==
Hervé Djamel Loiseau during French military service, circa. 1996 or 1998.

His body would end up being found dead by local Pakistanis some time in December 2001, having died of hunger and cold. Two T-shirts. One shirt. A Koran. A used London-to-Pakistan plane ticket, about $30 in Pakistani rupees, about $7 in Afghani currency, a pair of scissors, a French national identity card and two aspirins would be found with him.

== Legacy ==
Five years after his death, an independent French film entitled Djamel Loiseau: Journey of a Soldier of Allah was produced by Ranwa Stephan.
