= Imad Achab Kanouni =

French citizen

Imad Achab Kanouni is a French citizen who was held in extrajudicial detention in the United States Guantanamo Bay detention camps, in Cuba. Kanouni was captured in Afghanistan in 2001 and transferred to France on July 26, 2004. Under French law, detainees like Kanouni can be held, for up to three years, under the control of a judge.

Kanouni was released from custody and put on a kind of parole on July 9, 2005. He and five other French former Guantanamo detainees were charged on April 26, 2006. Testifying in his own defense, on July 3, 2006, Kanouni told a French court that he had traveled to Afghanistan to pursue religious education, that he didn't agree with Osama bin Laden, and never attended any military training camps. He did acknowledge: "I was ready to die for a good cause, defend people who were attacked in their countries"

His Internment Serial Number at Guantanamo was 164.

== See also ==
- Mourad Benchellali
- Nizar Sassi
- Brahim Yadel
- Khaled ben Mustafa
- Redouane Khalid
- Karim Bourti
