= Nizar Sassi =

Nizar Sassi (born August 1, 1979) is a citizen of France who was detained by the United States in their Guantanamo Bay Naval Base, Cuba. His Guantanamo Internment Serial Number was 325.

Sassi was transferred to Guantanamo Bay in 2002. He was repatriated to France on July 27, 2004. Sassis remained in French custody until January 9, 2006. Although originally convicted in France, his trial was overturned and he was released in February 2009.

Sassi worked for the Vénissieux Council. Vénissieux is a suburb of Lyon, France.

According to his brother, Aymen, Nizar traveled to Pakistan to learn formal Arabic.

Security authorities claim Sassi travelled to Afghanistan in 2001 at the direction of, an alleged al-Qaeda recruiter. Mourad Benchellali and Sassi are alleged to have traveled to Afghanistan on forged passports.

Nizar Sassi and four other men stood trial on terrorism charges upon their return to France. The five men's convictions were overturned in February 2009, because they had improperly been interviewed by France's intelligence officials, who were not authorized to act in a law enforcement role. On February 17, 2010, the Court of Cassation, a higher court, ordered a re-trial of the five men.

== Mourad Benchellali's McClatchy interview ==
On June 15, 2008, the McClatchy News Service published articles based on interviews with 66 former Guantanamo captives. McClatchy reporters interviewed Mourad Benchellali in France. In his interview Mourad described how he and Nizar were tricked into traveling to Afghanistan by his older brother Menad Benchellali. He described how they found Afghanistan nothing like what they expected. He described not speaking Pashto, Dari or Arabic, but they met some Algerians who spoke French, who suggested they attend a religious camp.

During his interview Mourad described what it was like to attend the training camp: a lot of praying; lectures on jihad; physical training; some weapons training, which did not include any weapons. He said he and Nizar realized the only way to leave the camp early was to fall ill, so they pretended to fall ill, only to be sent to the camp infirmary. But then he said Nizar really did fall ill, eventually losing 45 pounds.

Mourad described reconnecting with Nizar after his time at the camp was over, and asking the Algerians for help leaving Afghanistan. They told them they would have to wait a few weeks while arrangements were made, but then the USA attacked, and it was not possible to leave.

== French trial ==
Nizar Sassi, and four other French citizens, were convicted in 2007 of "criminal association with a terrorist enterprise." They had their convictions overturned on appeal on February 24, 2009. Their convictions were overturned because they were based on interrogations conducted in Guantanamo, and the interrogations were conducted by French security officials, not law enforcement officials.

== Sued American officials ==
Sassi and Mourad Benchellali sued several senior American officials, over the torture they were subjected to there. Retired General Geoffrey Miller, a former commandant of the Guantanamo camp, as well as being the architect of torture and abuse at Abu Ghraib was called upon to testify. Their lawyer, William Bourdon, characterized Miller's non-appearance as "a dual act of contempt against the French judiciary; he both refused to appear and to provide any explanation about his role and that of the US administration." William Haynes, formerly the Pentagon's Chief Legal Counsel, was called to testify in October 2016.

== Bibliography ==
- (in German) Ich war gefangen in Guantanamo – Ein Ex-Häftling erzählt Heyne, München, 2006, ISBN 3-453-12095-7
- (in Italian) Nizar Sassi: Prigioniero 325, Delta Camp. Einaudi, Torino, 2006. ISBN 88-06-18471-7
- (in Spanish) Nizar Sassi: Guantanamo, Prisionero 325, Campo Delta. Edaf S.A. 07/2006 ISBN 84-414-1802-0
- (in Norwegian) Nizar Sassi: Fange 325 : dokumentar fra Guantánamo-leiren Oslo, Aschehoug, 2006. ISBN 82-03-23408-9

== See also ==
- Mourad Benchellali
- Imad Kanouni
- Brahim Yadel
- Karim Bourti
- Khaled Ben Mustafa
- Ridouane Khalid
