= Operation Eagle Fury =

US military operation during the Afghan war

Operation Eagle Fury was a military operation led by the United States in Afghanistan involving Bravo Company and two Charlie Company SFODAs (762 and 765), 2nd BN, 7th SFG(A) US Army Special Forces, and a sniper team of USN SEALs, members of the QRF 82nd Airborne Division, and loyal Afghan fighters from 9–28 February 2003. The aim of the operation was to corner Taliban fighters and leaders in the Baghran Valley, located in Helmand Province, in the mountains of south-east Afghanistan. The battle took place in the village of Lejay for 43 consecutive hours. This continues to be the longest solely Special Forces battle to take place during the Afghanistan war.

As part of this operation, in mid-February 2003, the 82nd conducted the first airdrop of fuel to support Operation Enduring Freedom. They dropped 38,088 gallons of fuel, almost certainly the first combat fuel drop since the Vietnam War.
