= Moheb Ullah Borekzai =

Afghan Guantanamo detainee

Muhibullah
- Born: 1982 (age 43–44); Shah Wali Koot, Afghanistan
- Arrested: November 2001
- Released: 2005-07-19; Afghanistan
- Detained at: Guantanamo
- Other name: Moheb Ullah Borekzai
- ISN: 546
- Charge: No charge (held in extrajudicial detention)
- Status: DoD claims he "returned to supporting terrorism"

Muhibullah or Moheb Ullah Borekzai is a citizen of Afghanistan who was held in extrajudicial detention in the United States' Guantanamo Bay detention camps, in Cuba. His Guantanamo Internment Serial Number was 546. American intelligence analysts estimate that Muhibullah was born in 1982, in Shah Wali Koot, Afghanistan.

He was captured in Afghanistan in November 2001, transferred to Guantanamo on May 5, 2002, and was transferred to Afghanistan on July 19, 2005. US Intelligence analysts have asserted that Muhibullah was a recidivist, who, after his transfer, "engaged in terrorism or militant activity" and had "re-engaged in terrorism".

When Borekzai and fellow Afghan captive Habir Russol were repatriated in July 2005, they provided the first account of a widespread hunger strike. Borekzai also offered accounts of Quran abuse.

== Conflicting accounts of his real name ==
Guantanamo contained at least two captives with very similar names. Guantanamo captive 974 was listed as Mohe Bullar on the official lists released on April 20, 2006, and May 15, 2006.

- He was listed as Mohib Ullah on his Joint Task Force Guantanamo assessment, date November 15, 2003.
- He was listed as FNU Muhibullah on the Summary of Evidence memos drafted for his 2004 and 2005 OARDEC status reviews, and on the official lists of captives first published in 2006.

However, in the Associated Press interview he gave upon his repatriation his name was listed as Moheb Ullah Borezkai.

== Official status reviews ==
Initially the Bush administration asserted that they could withhold all the protections of the Geneva Conventions to captives from the war on terror. However, in 2004, in Rasul v. Bush the United States Supreme Court ruled that the captives had to be informed of the justifications for their detention, and had to be given an opportunity to defend themselves against those allegations.

=== Office for the Administrative Review of Detained Enemy Combatants ===
In response to the Supreme Court ruling in Rasul v. Bush, the Department of Defense set up the Office for the Administrative Review of Detained Enemy Combatants, which conducted annual reviews of the captives status. Borekzai had two reviews scheduled in 2004, and he chose to attend both of them.

According to Andy Worthington, the author of The Guantanamo Files Borekzai had been a Taliban conscript, who was taken captive by post-Taliban forces, handed over the powerful militia leader Ismael Khan, who, in turn, sold him the US forces. Worthington noted with skepticism that American analysts accepted the claim that 19-year-old conscript Borekzai was the "acting governor of Sheberghan". Addressing the claim of American analysts that he "was part of a tribal militia that supported the Taliban for three and a half years since 1998″ Worthington pointed out that "he was 15 or 16 years old, and was therefore not responsible for his actions, which, presumably, were dictated by his family.″

Muhibullah chose to participate in his Combatant Status Review Tribunal.

=== Allegations ===
The allegations Muhibullah faced, during his Tribunal, were:

a. The detainee is a member of the Taliban.

1. Detainee was recruited by Syed Sha Agha in late 1998/early 1999 to serve in the Taliban Security Force. The detainee worked in Kabul and carried a Kalashnikov rifle and ammunition for approximately one and a half years.
2. Detainee worked for Syed Shah Agha or Abdul Bari, an official in the Sheberghan region, in Sheberghan, AF [sic], from November 2000 to February 2001 and again from September 2001 to November 2001. The detainee was responsible for civil dispute mediation.
3. Detainee attended a dinner hosted by Commandant Kamal [sic] at his home in Torghundi, AF [sic]. Kamal was warlord for Ismail Khan.
4. The Detainee acquired a rifle from a Mujahideen fighter, Abdul Ghafar.
5. Detainee surrendered to Northern Alliance forces in November 2001.

=== Response to the allegations ===
- Muhibullah confirmed that he worked as a guard to Syed Sha Agha, but he disputed that he did so for a year and a half. Rather he was forcibly conscripted twice. Both times for periods of two or three months.
- Muhibullah repeatedly stated that he did not understand the European date system.
- Muhibullah stated that, in addition to guard duty his responsibilities including kitchen and other household chores.
- Muhibullah confirmed his presence at a dinner where Commandant Kamal was present. But he did not know Kamal. He wasn't invited by Kamal. He was present merely to perform guard duty.
- Muhibullah denied knowing anyone named Abdul Ghafar.

== Administrative Review Board hearing ==
Detainees who were determined to have been properly classified as "enemy combatants" were scheduled to have their dossier reviewed at annual Administrative Review Board hearings. The Administrative Review Boards were not authorized to review whether a detainee qualified for POW status, and they were not authorized to review whether a detainee should have been classified as an "enemy combatant".

They were authorized to consider whether a detainee should continue to be detained by the United States, because they continued to pose a threat—or whether they could safely be repatriated to the custody of their home country, or whether they could be set free.

The factors for and against continuing to detain Muhibullah were among the 121 that the Department of Defense released on March 3, 2006.

=== The following primary factors favor continued detention ===
a. Connections/Associations

1. The detainee worked for the Taliban Governor of Sheberghan and claims to have been the Acting Governor for a period of time. When the Taliban fell, he heeded instructions heard over the radio to surrender. The detainee turned himself in to forces under Ismail Khan. At the time of his surrender he was in possession of six Kalashnikov rifles.
2. The detainee had a relationship with the Taliban, in that he served for them as a night watchman in Kabul over a two year period, and as a dispute mediator in Sheberghan.

b. Training

1. The detainee admitted to receiving instruction in the use of AK-47 and RPG from his uncle.

c. Intent

1. The detainee admitted to carrying an AK-47 in conjunction with his duties as a guard for the Taliban.

=== The following primary factors favor release or transfer ===
a. Other Relevant Data

1. The detainee claimed he was forced into service with the Taliban and had no choice in the matter.

=== Transcript ===
Muhibullah chose to participate in his Administrative Review Board hearing.

== Repatriation ==
On November 26, 2008 the Department of Defense published a list of when captives left Guantanamo. According to that list Mohibullah was repatriated on July 19, 2005.

Reporters interviewed Borekzai, and Habir Russol, another Afghan who was released at the same time, on July 20, 2005, the day they arrived home. In this interview they revealed that Camp Delta was in the midst of a widespread hunger strike. Borekzai and Russol estimated that over 180 detainees were participating in the hunger strike, and that it had been going on for over two weeks. Initially DoD spokesman Flex Plexico denied any knowledge of a hunger strike.

In her book Democracy Detained: Secret Unconstitutional Practices in the U.S. War on Terror Barbara Olshansky, a senior lawyer with the Center for Constitutional Rights, attributed the first public news of the hunger strike to Borekzai and Russol. She noted that DoD press officers initially denied there was a hunger strike, but that "over the course of the week following Russol and Borezkai's public announcement, the Defense Department was forced to admit that yet another strike was ongoing."

On July 21, 2005, three days after their departure, Plexico claimed that only a small number of detainees had been refusing food, and that they had only been doing so for three days. The lawyers of Guantanamo details later corroborated the details of the Afghans claims, saying that they had been aware of the hunger strike as early as June 23, 2005, but had not been able to say anything because of a DoD gag place on them.

Borekzai told the Associated Press the detainees were protesting because "some of these people say they were mistreated during interrogation. Some say they are innocent." The two Afghans said they had been accused of being members of the former Taliban regime, but both said they were innocent.

Borekzai said that camp authorities had announced over the camp public address system that guards would stop showing disrespect to Quran, and that he was not aware of any recent incidents.

== Pentagon claim he had "returned to the fight" ==
On May 20, 2009, the New York Times, citing an unreleased Pentagon document, reported that Department of Defense officials claimed Mohibullah was one of 74 former Guantanatmo captives who "are engaged in terrorism or militant activity." On May 27, 2009, the Defense Intelligence Agency published a "fact sheet" listing Guantanamo captives who had "re-engaged in terrorism". It stated that Mohibullah was suspected of "association with the Taliban".
