= Haji Faiz Mohammed =

- Born: (estimated) 1932 (age 93–94)
- Detained at: Guantanamo
- ISN: 657
- Status: Repatriated

Haji Faiz Mohammed (Arabic: محمد حجي فز; born c. 1932) is an elderly Afghan national who was held in extrajudicial detention and interrogated by the United States military in the Guantanamo Bay detention camps, in Cuba. Mohammed spent about eight months in Guantanamo and was repatriated on October 28, 2002.

== Detention in Guantanamo ==
I don't know why the Americans arrested me. I told them I was innocent. I'm just an old man.

— Haji Faiz Mohammed

Mohammed was flown to the U.S. military detention camp in Guantanamo in 2002 after being swept up in a raid by troops in Afghanistan. An assessment written by the Joint Task Force Guantanamo says. "There is no reason on the record for detainee being transferred to Guantánamo Bay detention facility,"

Faiz was released in October 2002 after being held for eight months, and was put in the Medical Scientific Academy Hospital in Kabul.

== Mohammed's age ==
Mohammed, who American intelligence analysts estimate was approximately 72 years old at the time, said the Americans had initially seized him during a hospital visit in Uruzgan. He says he was blindfolded and bound, then flown to Kandahar in a helicopter.

Reports suggest that he bordered on senile and initially claimed that he was over a hundred years old. The New York Times said that he was "babbling at times like a child...struggled to complete sentences and strained to hear words that were shouted at him."

== See also ==
- Mohammed Sadiq elderly prisoner held at Guantanamo
- Nasrat Khan elderly prisoner held at Guantanamo
