= Raes Abdul Wahed =

Afghan warlord

Raes Abdul Wahed رئیس عبدالواحد
- Occupation: Taliban member

Raes Abdul Wahed (also transliterated as Abdul Rais Wahid and Abdul Wahid) is an Afghan warlord.

According to an article in the May 23, 2002 issue of Time magazine, Wahed was a Taliban commander who surrendered on January 5, 2002. Time reported that Wahed remained at large and in command of his district. Other sources report that Wahed hid Taliban leader Mullah Omar, and enabled his escape.

By 2003 Wahed had gone underground. Intelligence reports, prepared for the Combatant Status Review Tribunals and Administrative Review Board hearings of some Afghan detainees described Wahed as “...the Supreme Commander of a forty-man guerilla unit.”

Several Guantanamo detainees were captured following an ambush attempt near the village of Lejay, Afghanistan, described as "Wahed's stronghold". According to Abdul Bagi, one of the detainees captured following the skirmish on February 10, 2003, Wahed's base was in the neighboring village of Shna, Afghanistan. Bagi said Wahid didn't spend much time in the vicinity of Shna and Lejay, but rather spent most of his time in Kandahar. The Lejay villagers disputed that Wahed was associated with the Taliban. They asserted he had built the fortified compound when the communists had appointed him a regional administrator, and that they all hated him because he had murdered their neighbors and relatives during his time in power, during the Communist regime. They asserted he was from a rival tribe from theirs.

== The "forty-man unit" ==
According to the allegations prepared for the Guantanamo Combatant Status Review Tribunals and Administrative Review Board hearings, a number of the captives had served in the "forty-man unit".

Individuals alleged to have served in the "forty-man unit"
isn	name	notes
849	Mohammed Nassim	Faced the allegation: The detainee worked for a Taliban Commander and was part of a special forty-man unit.: Allegedly participated in an October 22, 2002 rocket attack in Nangarhar Province.
886	Nasrullah	Faced the allegations: The detainee is identified as joining a 40-man group after the end of the Taliban regime.; A source identified the detainee as part of the 40-man unit. The detainee reports to his cousin who is a sub-commander in the 40-man unit. The 40-man unit is an organization supported by al Qaida.
888	Esmatulla	Faced the allegations: Detainee states he was part of a forty-man unit under the control of Commander Akhund Zada and fought on the front line against General Dostum's Northern Alliance forces.; The detainee was a sub-Commander of some members of a 40-man unit. This unit fought at Tora Bora and escaped to Peshawar, Pakistan.; This 40-man Taliban team was under the control of Commander Akhund Zada. The team was part of the front line against the Northern Alliance.
890	Rahmatullah Sangaryar	
942	Abdul Razzaq Hekmati	Alleged to be second in command of the 40-man unit.; Abdul Razzaq Hekmati had an iron-clad alibi. He had been living as a refugee in Iran, receiving a stipend, which was a reward for rescuing three Northern Alliance leaders from a Taliban prison.
943	Abdul Ghani	Among the allegations Abdul Ghani faced were: A source stated the detainee was also a part of a 40-man training team that taught hand grenade techniques, use of plastic explosives and automobile explosive device use for deployment outside of Afghanistan.; One of the tasks of the 40-man unit was to provide protection to al Qaida for travel in Afghanistan.; Abdul Ghani was the 22nd Guantanamo captive to face charges before a Guantanamo military commission.
963	Abdul Bagi	
968	Bismullah	
1030	Abdul Hafiz	

== See also ==
- Abdul Bagi
- Rahmatullah
- Alif Mohammed
- Baridad
