= Hussein Azzam =

Palestinian Guantanamo detainee

- Born: 1973 (age 52–53); Palestine
- Detained at: Guantanamo; Bagram
- Charge(s): no charge, held in extrajudicial detention
- Status: Released
- Children: Eight children

Born in Palestine in 1973, Hussein Azzam was a former prisoner held in extrajudicial detention in the United States Guantanamo Bay detainment camps, in Cuba.

He was released in 2004, two years after his capture, without charge and returned home to his family. According to the United States Department of Defense's official list of release dates, a captive listed as "Abdul Qadir Yousef Hussein" was transferred on March 31, 2004. His Internment Serial Number was 715.

== Life ==
A cousin of scholar and jihadist Abdullah Azzam, Azzam studied Islamic law in Saudi Arabia and received his Master's degree before returning to Palestine, where he had trouble finding work as a teacher in the West Bank.

In 1985 he moved to Peshawar, Pakistan, as he heard that the country had begun setting up schools for the refugees flooding in from the Soviet invasion of Afghanistan. He remained as a teacher in the region through the 2001 American invasion of Afghanistan, but was not targeted by any forces and said that he felt no fear as he had no connection to local militants.

== Arrest ==
Azzam's home was raided by Pakistani forces on May 25, 2002, and he was arrested along with his two sons, the 23-year-old Abdullah and 18-year-old Muhammad. The two boys were released, but Azzam was held.

He was transferred to the Bagram collection point facility, before being flown to the Guantanamo detainment camps. He was interrogated five times over a captivity of 10 months.

After his arrest, his family moved back to Jordan to avoid persecution. However the increased cost of health care in the country meant that his son Abdullah's heart condition worsened, and he died in February 2004.

== Release ==
Azzam was released on August 27, 2004, and returned to his family in Jordan.
