= Brahim Yadel =

French extrajudicial detainee

- Born: Brahim Yadel; March 17, 1971 (age 55); Aubervilliers, France
- Citizenship: France
- Detained at: Guantanamo
- ISN: 371
- Status: Released

Brahim Yadel (born March 17, 1971) is a citizen of France who was held in extrajudicial detention in the United States Guantanamo Bay detainment camps, in Cuba. His Guantanamo Internment Serial Number was 371. Born in Aubervilliers, France, the Department of Defense has reported his date of birth.

Although originally convicted in France, his trial was overturned and he was released in February 2009. On February 17, 2010, the Court of Cassation, the highest court in France, ordered a re-trial of Brahim Yadel and four other men.

== Allegations of ties to terrorism ==
A Time magazine article, published on March 16, 2003, reported that Brahim Yadel was recruited by Karim Bourti. According to the article, Karim Bourti was: "...a self-described Paris-based recruiter for international jihad."

Brahim Yadel, and three other French Guantanamo captives, were repatriated to French custody on July 28, 2004. Brahim Yadel was repatriated to France one day prior to the institution of the Combatant Status Review Tribunals in July 2004.

French authorities held Brahim Yadel, Nizar Sassi, Mourad Benchellali and Imad Kanouni on charges of "associating with criminals engaged in a terrorist enterprise."

French authorities suspected Brahim Yadel helped organize jihadist training camps in the forest of Fontainebleau.

== Formerly secret Joint Task Force Guantanamo assessment ==
On April 25, 2011, whistleblower organization WikiLeaks published formerly secret assessments drafted by Joint Task Force Guantanamo analysts. His Joint Task Force Guantanamo assessment was two pages long, and was drafted on January 31, 2004. It was signed by camp commandant Geoffrey D. Miller. He recommended Bradel be detained under DoD control.

== French trial ==
Brahim Yadel and five other returned Guantanamo detainees were to stand trial in France in 2006.

While all the other men free on conditional release, preceding the trial, Brahim Yadel was kept in detention. He had violated the terms of his conditional release.

=== Trial delayed ===
The trial was delayed to allow an investigation into the conduct of French intelligence agents who interrogated the men in Guantanamo. France had insisted French agents had not interrogated the men in Guantanamo, but leaked memos showed this was untrue.

Judge Jean-Claude Kross apologized, saying: "I am sorry, we have to start again from scratch".

The Prosecutor has recommended lenient, one-year prison sentences, to take into account their "abnormal detention" in Guantanamo.

=== Conviction and appeal ===
Brahim Yadel, and four other French citizens, were convicted in 2007 of "criminal association with a terrorist enterprise." They had their convictions overturned on appeal on February 24, 2009. Their convictions were overturned because they were based on interrogations conducted in Guantanamo, and the interrogations were conducted by French security officials, not law enforcement officials.

== McClatchy interview ==
On June 15, 2008, the McClatchy News Service published articles based on interviews with 66 former Guantanamo captives. McClatchy reporters interviewed Brahim Yadel in France. According to his McClatchy interviewer, Brahim Yadel was disgusted by al Qaeda's attacks on September 11, 2001, and tried to flee Afghanistan immediately after he heard of them, and never engaged in hostilities against US forces. However, he acknowledged receiving military training in Afghanistan, and "even took advanced al Qaida courses in electronics that would have led to bomb making."

- I always differentiated between war to defend Islam and terrorism. I went to Afghanistan to defend Islam, for jihad. Had this been a military engagement, I would have stood and fought. Of course, it was not, and I wanted nothing to do with it.
- I simply told the truth, that I wished to be a soldier to fight soldiers, that I had no intention of fighting civilians. I always told the entire truth. I think they respected that.

He told his McClatchy interviewer that he saw the USS Cole as a legitimate military target, but felt his non-western companions in Afghanistan had no idea how appalling the attack on the World Trade Center was:

"I knew bin Laden was against the Americans," he said. "In the logic of war, attacking a warship made sense. It wasn't my battle, but I could understand it. Unlike the Afghans, I'd grown up in Western culture, which means American culture. They didn't understand the enormity of what had happened. I did. It was horrible. I didn't believe in this war."

== See also ==
- Khaled ben Mustafa
- Redouane Khalid
