= Nasrat Khan =

- Other name: Nasrat Khan

Hajji Nasrat Khan is an elderly citizen of Afghanistan best known for the more than three years he spent in extrajudicial detention in the United States Guantanamo Bay detention camps, in Cuba. The United States Department of Defense believed that he was an enemy combatant and assigned him the Internment Serial Number 1009.

Khan, who has been crippled since 1986, was 80 years old in April 2006. He was the oldest prisoner remaining at Guantanamo by the time he was released (August, 2006).

== Combatant Status Review Tribunal ==
Nasrat Khan was among the 60% of prisoners who chose to participate in his tribunal hearings.

=== Summary of Evidence memo ===
A Summary of Evidence memo was prepared for Hajji Nasrat Khan's Combatant Status Review Tribunal, on 5 October 2004. The memo listed the following allegations against him:

a. The detainee was a member of a Terrorist Organization tied to al Qaida:
1. The detainee was a local commander in the HIG.
2. The detainee was a primary coordinator for the HIG in Sarobi, Afghanistan.
3. HIG leadership reportedly had a plot to kidnap one or more coalition force members to use as hostages in exchange for arrested HIG leader Hajji Nasrat Khan (detainee) and his son Izat
4. The HIG is an active terrorist organization in Afghanistan with long established ties to Usama Bin Laden.

b. The detainee was engaged in hostile activities against the United States or its coalition partners:
1. Large caches of weapons were recovered from the compound where detainee lived, including 107MM rocket launchers, PKMs, AK-47s and uniforms.
2. At the time of detainee's captured [sic], the HIG was conducting surveillance and planning rocket attacks against US forces in the area.

=== Transcript ===
Khan chose to participate in his Combatant Status Review Tribunal.

== Administrative Review Board hearing ==
Detainees who were determined to have been properly classified as "enemy combatants" were scheduled to have their dossier reviewed at annual Administrative Review Board hearings. The Administrative Review Boards weren't authorized to review whether a detainee qualified for POW status, and they weren't authorized to review whether a detainee should have been classified as an "enemy combatant".

They were authorized to consider whether a detainee should continue to be detained by the United States, because they continued to pose a threat - or whether they could safely be repatriated to the custody of their home country, or whether they could be set free.

Khan chose to participate in his Administrative Review Board hearing.

The following primary factors favor continued detention

a. Commitment
1. Detainee's son admitted that he and his father fought with the Taliban.
2. Detainee was captured by United States Forces with 700 weapons, including small arms and rockets.
3. Detainee was captured with letters addressed to him and from him although he claims to be uneducated and illiterate.

b. Training
1. Detainee claims he served in the Afghan Army in the late 1950s or 1960s. Detainee claims he only served as an infantryman for approximately two years and only received small arms training.

c. Connections/Associations
1. Detainee was a Hizb-I Islami Gulbuddin [sic] commander.
2. Hizb-I Islami Gulbuddin (HIG) was one of the major mujahedin groups in the war against the Soviets. HIG has long established ties with Usama bin Laden. Gulbuddin Hikmatyar founded HIG. Hikmatyar ran several terrorist training camps in Afghanistan and was a pioneer in sending mercenary fighters to other Islamic fighting conflicts. Hikmatyar offered to shelter Usama bin Laden after he later fled Sudan in 1996.
3. Detainee was a village leader in an area controlled by the Hizb-I Islami Gulbuddin (HIG).
4. Detainee claims he only met Gulbuddin Hikmatyar once.
5. Reporting states Hizb-I Islami Gulbuddin members were planning to kidnap United States Personnel on the Kabul to Jalalabad road between the Sorobi, Kabul province, Afghanistan and Jalalabad, Nangrahar province], Afghanistan to exchange for a captured Hizb-I Islami Gulbuddin commander.
6. Further reporting states Hizb-I Islami Gulbuddin wanted to kidnap United States military personnel from Bagram Airfield.
7. Detainee claims that Engineer Wasil was his son's commander.
8. Reporting states Wasil is a known member of Hizb-I Islami Gulbuddin.
9. Reporting further states Wasil is not supportive of the United States, and believes the United States should not be in Afghanistan.
10. Detainee's son is a commander of the Hizb-I Islami Gulbuddin.
11. Detainee's son admitted to having a weapons cache in his residence in the region of Sorobi.
12. Reporting states the Detainee's son has links to al Qaida, Taliban and Hizb-I Islami Gulbuddin which led to his son's arrest.

The following primary factor favor release or transfer

1. Detainee claims he retired as the Hizb-I Islami Gulbuddin fifteen years ago when his health began to fail.
2. Detainee stated he did know anything about the weapons found in the residence he was captured in.

== Witness at other Tribunals ==
Khan was interviewed, and provided a statement for Hamidullah's Tribunal. He confirmed that Hamidullah had only been a teenager when he had been in the HiG, and that he had been a deserter.

== Habeas Corpus ==
Philadelphia lawyer Peter M. Ryan is representing Khan in his habeas corpus motion.

== Khan's age ==
United Kingdom newspaper, The Guardian, republished an Associated Press article, devoted to Khan, which speculated about his age. The article says that the United States estimates Khan's age as 71. It says that Khan doesn't know his age for sure, but believes he is about 78. The article states that Khan requires a walker.

== Return to Afghanistan ==
Khan was reported to have been one of five Afghans returned to Afghanistan on August 28, 2006.

Peter M. Ryan, one of Khan's lawyers, learned of his return by e-mail from the DoD, on the following weekend, and never did learn the reason for Khan's detention.

Ryan initially expressed concerns whether Khan could expect the Afghan authorities to free him, upon his return, or whether they would put him in the Afghan prison system., but Khan did not ultimately face arrest upon his return to Afghanistan.

== Guantanamo Medical records ==
On 16 March 2007, the Department of Defense published medical records for the detainees.

== See also ==
- Hiztullah Yar Nasrat his son formerly detained at Guantanamo
- Mohammed Sadiq another elderly prisoner held at Guantanamo
- Haji Faiz Mohammed elderly prisoner held at Guantanamo
