= Mohammad Al Rahman Al Shumrani =

Saudi Arabian citizen held at Guantanamo Bay

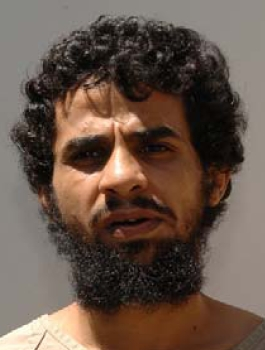
- Mohammad Al Rahman Al Shumrani's identity portrait, showing him wearing the white uniform issued to white uniform individuals.
- Born: February 27, 1975 (age 51); Riyadh, Saudi Arabia
- Occupation: charity worker

Mohammad Al Rahman Al Shumrani (born February 27, 1975, in Riyadh) is a citizen of Saudi Arabia who was held in the United States Guantanamo Bay Naval Base, in Cuba. His Guantanamo Internment Serial Number was 195.

A relief worker living in Afghanistan, al-Shumrani was arrested in 2001.

Al-Shumrani was transferred to Guantanamo on January 17, 2002. As of August 2015, he remains held in Guantanamo as one of the "forever prisoners", individuals considered too innocent to face charges, but too dangerous to be released.

On August 7, 2015, Carol Rosenberg, writing in the Miami Herald, reported that documents presented to his 2015 Periodic Review Board panel, his following the news on ISIS was offered as a justification for his continued detention.

Shumrani was repatriated to Saudi Arabia on January 11, 2016, the anniversary of the camp's opening.

== Official status reviews ==
Originally the Bush Presidency asserted that captives apprehended in the "war on terror" were not covered by the Geneva Conventions, and could be held indefinitely, without charge, and without an open and transparent review of the justifications for their detention. In 2004, the United States Supreme Court ruled, in Rasul v. Bush, that Guantanamo captives were entitled to being informed of the allegations justifying their detention, and were entitled to try to refute them.

=== Office for the Administrative Review of Detained Enemy Combatants ===
Combatant Status Review Tribunals were held in a 3x5 meter trailer where the captive sat with his hands and feet shackled to a bolt in the floor.

Following the Supreme Court's ruling the Department of Defense set up the Office for the Administrative Review of Detained Enemy Combatants.

Scholars at the Brookings Institution, led by Benjamin Wittes, listed the captives still held in Guantanamo in December 2008, according to whether their detention was justified by certain common allegations:

- Mohammad Al Rahman Al Shumrani was listed as one of the captives who "The military alleges ... are associated with both Al Qaeda and the Taliban."
- Mohammad Al Rahman Al Shumrani was listed as one of the captives who "The military alleges ... traveled to Afghanistan for jihad."
- Mohammad Al Rahman Al Shumrani was listed as one of the captives who "The military alleges that the following detainees stayed in Al Qaeda, Taliban or other guest- or safehouses."
- Mohammad Al Rahman Al Shumrani was listed as one of the captives who "The military alleges ... took military or terrorist training in Afghanistan."
- Mohammad Al Rahman Al Shumrani was listed as one of the captives who "The military alleges ... fought for the Taliban."
- Mohammad Al Rahman Al Shumrani was listed as one of the captives who "The military alleges ... were at Tora Bora."
- Mohammad Al Rahman Al Shumrani was listed as one of the captives whose "names or aliases were found on material seized in raids on Al Qaeda safehouses and facilities."
- Mohammad Al Rahman Al Shumrani was listed as one of the captives who "The military alleges that the following detainees were captured under circumstances that strongly suggest belligerency."
- Mohammad Al Rahman Al Shumrani was listed as one of the captives who was an "al Qaeda operative".
- Mohammad Al Rahman Al Shumrani was listed as one of the "82 detainees made no statement to CSRT or ARB tribunals or made statements that do not bear materially on the military's allegations against them."

=== Habeas petition ===
Al-Shumrani had a habeas corpus petition submitted on his behalf.

=== Formerly secret Joint Task Force Guantanamo assessment ===
On April 25, 2011, whistleblower organization WikiLeaks published formerly secret assessments drafted by Joint Task Force Guantanamo analysts. His Joint Task Force Guantanamo assessment, dated October 24, 2008, called him Muhammad Abd al-Rahman al-Shumrant. His assessment was twelve pages long and was signed by camp commandant Rear Admiral David M. Thomas Jr. He recommended continued detention.

=== Guantanamo Review Task Force ===
On January 21, 2009, the day he was inaugurated, United States President Barack Obama issued three Executive orders related to the detention of individuals in Guantanamo. He established a task force to re-review the status of all the remaining captives. Where the OARDEC officials reviewing the status of the captives were all "field grade" officers in the US military (Commanders, naval Captains, Lieutenant Colonels and Colonels) the officials seconded to the task force were drawn from not only the Department of Defense, but also from five other agencies, including the Departments of State, Justice, Homeland Security. President Obama gave the task force a year, it recommended the release of 55 individuals who were assessed as not representing a serious threat. The task force recommended several dozen other individuals should face war crime charges before a Guantanamo military commission. A third group was composed of individuals who could not be charged with a crime, because there was no evidence they committed a crime, but who were, nevertheless, considered too dangerous to release.

Al-Shumrani was a listed in the third group.
