= Menad Benchellali =

Alleged French chemical weapons specialist for al-Qaeda

Menad Benchellali is a convicted terrorist arrested in France in December 2002, and the reported brains behind the so-called Chechen Network, a group of Islamists who plotted a number of abortive terrorist attacks on French soil.

Benchellali was arrested as part of an investigation into efforts by French Islamists to send volunteers to fight Russian forces as part of the Second Chechen War. In January 2004, a number of Benchellali's associates were arrested by French police, who claimed to have thwarted chemical or biological weapons attacks.

Benchellali himself is reported to have been a chemical weapons specialist, and was known to his associates as The Chemist. French investigators assert that, when Benchellali returned to France, from Afghanistan, he built a home lab in his bedroom, where he manufactured ricin.

Benchellali is reported to have sent his younger brother and a friend, Nizar Sassi, to Afghanistan. Mourad and Sassi were captured and detained in Guantanamo.

Benchellali, was convicted, along with 24 others, on June 14, 2006 for their roles in planning a terrorist attack that was to have taken place in France to support Chechen independence. Benchellali was described as the group's leader, and received a 10-year sentence. Benchellali's father, a younger brother, and his mother were also convicted for their roles.

Mourad Benchellali published a book about his experiences, and on June 14, 2006 the New York Times published an op-ed by Mourad, in which he blamed Menad for tricking him into attending a military training camp on what he thought would be a kind of vacation. Mourad said he was looking forward to his day in court, for attending that training camp, after spending years in detention, without charge, in Guantanamo.
