= Polad Sabir Sirajov =

Azerbaijani Guantanamo detainee

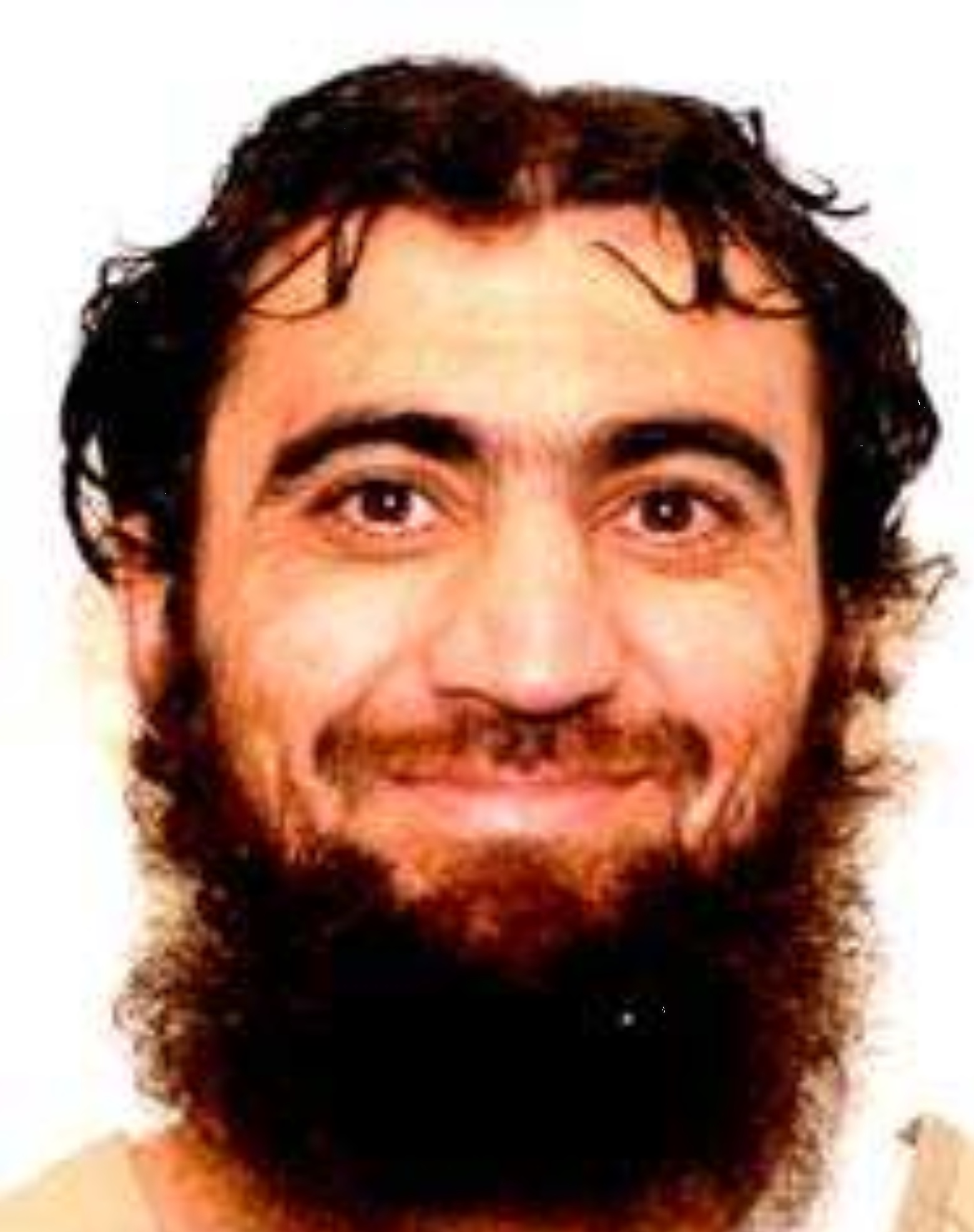
- Born: May 6, 1975 (age 51)
- Released: 2010-01; Slovakia
- Detained at: Guantanamo
- Other names: Poolad T Tsiradzho, Abd Al Zaher
- ISN: 89
- Charge: No charge
- Status: Transferred to Slovakia

Polad Sabir Sirajov is a citizen of Azerbaijan formerly held in the United States Guantanamo Bay detention camps, in Cuba.

According to a complete list of the names of the remaining Guantanamo detainees published on April 20, 2006, Sirajov's name is spelled Poolad T. Tsiradzho. Sirajov's Guantanamo Internment Serial Number was 89.

According to a second list of all the Guantanamo detainees, published on May 15, 2006, Sirajov was born on May 6, 1975.

Poolad T Tsiradzho was transferred to Slovakia in January 2010.

== Background ==
Sirajov graduated in 1992 from Turkey's Erciyes University. He then worked, as a translator, for a Turkish construction company.

According to his family Sirajov disappeared on February 16, 2001. They are skeptical that he voluntarily joined up with a radical group because he was not particularly religious. The ICRC says he was captured at Mazari Sharif, Afghanistan.

He was reported to have been released to the Netherlands, but he was transferred to Slovakia in January 2010. In June 2010 Sirajov and two other former Guantanamo captives were reported to have gone on a hunger strike, to protest the conditions in the Slovak facility where they were kept.

== Official status reviews ==
=== Office for the Administrative Review of Detained Enemy Combatants ===
The Office for the Administrative Review of Detained Enemy Combatants (OARDEC) was forced to publish documents from the annual status reviews it held in 2004, 2005, 2006 and 2007.

Scholars at the Brookings Institution, led by Benjamin Wittes, listed the captives still held in Guantanamo in December 2008, according to whether their detention was justified by certain common allegations:

- Poolad T. Tsiradzho was listed as one of the captives who "The military alleges ... are fighters for the Taliban."
- Poolad T. Tsiradzho was listed as one of the captives who "The military alleges ... stayed in Al Qaeda, Taliban or other guest- or safehouses."
- Poolad T. Tsiradzho was listed as one of the captives who "The military alleges ... took military or terrorist training in Afghanistan."
- Poolad T. Tsiradzho was listed as one of the captives whose "names or aliases were found on material seized in raids on Al Qaeda safehouses and facilities."
- Poolad T. Tsiradzho was listed as one of the captives who was a foreign fighter.
- Poolad T. Tsiradzho was listed as one of the captives who "deny affiliation with Al Qaeda or the Taliban yet admit facts that, under the broad authority the laws of war give armed parties to detain the enemy, offer the government ample legal justification for its detention decisions."
- Poolad T. Tsiradzho was listed as one of the captives who had admitted "fighting on behalf of Al Qaeda or the Taliban."

=== Habeas petition ===
Sirajov had a habeas corpus petition published on his behalf. But, although the Department of Defense published documents from the CSR Tribunals of 179 captives, they did not publish any of his habeas documents.

In July 2008 the US District Court ruled that his habeas petition was moot.

On December 30, 2008 United States Department of Justice official Daniel M. Barish informed the court that the DoJ had filed "factual returns" in seven habeas cases, including captive 89's.

=== Formerly secret JTF-GTMO assessments ===
In April 2011 whistleblower organization WikiLeaks published formerly secret assessments prepared by Joint Task Force Guantanamo. Tsiradzho's assessment was dated January 25, 2008, and was nine pages long. It was signed by camp commandant Mark H. Buzby, and recommended continued detention under DoD control.

== Recruitment ==
Gamat Suleyman, the head of the Baku's Abu Bakr mosque, denied reports that said Polad had been recruited through the mosque. Suleyman said that with thousands of worshipers he did not know all of them personally, but he denied that "Wahabism, which is followed by radicals, including the leader of the Al-Qaeda terror cell bin Laden, has never been propagandized at Abu Bakr."

Rafig Aliyev, chairman of the State Committee for Work with Religious Associations, stated that 54 people had been arrested in the Mosque in the past, and that Wahabism is still promoted there. He expressed skepticism that a sole individual could contact bin Laden, without help.

== Release ==
The Azeri-Press Information Agency reported on May 25, 2006, that Sirajov requested that he be released to Russia, not Azerbaijan.

The Azeri-Press Information Agency quotes Elchin Behbudov of the Azerbaijan Committee Against Torture, who stated on June 1, 2006, that Sirajov was receiving rehabilitation treatment in a third country. Behbudov said that Sirajov was expectected to be returned to Russia, not Azeribaijan, when his treatment was complete.

Sirajov had been reported to be on his way to the Netherlands.

The Azeri-Press Information Agency reported on March 4, 2009, that Sirajov was still in Guantanamo. They reported that he was believed to be one of the 60 captives who have been cleared for release.

In 2009 Spanish newspapers reported Spain was considering accepting his transfer, along with five other men.

Polad was transferred to Slovakia in January 2010, with two north African men. Polad and the other men found that Slovakian security officials were insisting they be held under more onerous security restrictions than they experienced in Camp four Guantanamo.

In October 2011 Tibor Blažko reported that the two former Guantanamo captives from Egypt and Tunisia who had been transferred to Slovakia had returned to their home countries, while Polad still remained.
