= Ahmed Ameziane =

Moroccan politician

Ahmed Ameziane is a Moroccan politician. A member of the Popular Movement, he has served as Minister of Youth and Sports.
