= Pir Mohammad =

Pir Mohammad پيرمحمد
- Village
- Location within Iran
- Coordinates: 34°50′30″N 47°09′30″E
- Country: Iran
- Province: Kermanshah
- County: Sonqor
- Bakhsh: Kolyai
- Rural District: Kivanat

Population (2006)
  - Total: 70
- Time zone: UTC+3:30 (IRST)
  - Summer (DST): UTC+4:30 (IRDT)

Pir Mohammad (Persian: پيرمحمد, also Romanized as Pīr Moḩammad) is a village in Kivanat Rural District, Kolyai District, Sonqor County, Kermanshah Province, Iran. At the 2006 census, its population was 70, in 19 families.
