= Habir Russol =

Afghan Guantanamo detainee

Habir Russol is a citizen of Afghanistan who was held in extrajudicial detention in the United States Guantanamo Bay detainment camps, in Cuba. Russol was released from Guantanamo on July 18, 2005.

== Identity ==
Russol's release from Guantanamo was widely covered by the news media. However he was not named on the full official list of all the men who had been held in military custody, in Guantanamo. His internment serial number was 120.

== Press reports ==
Reporters interviewed Russol, and Moheb Ullah Borekzai, another Afghan who was released at the same time, on July 20, 2005, the day they arrived home. In this interview they revealed that Camp Delta was in the midst of a widespread hunger strike.

Borekzai and Russol estimated that over 180 detainees were participating in the hunger strike, and that it had been going on for over two weeks.

Initially DoD spokesman Flex Plexico denied any knowledge of a hunger strike. On July 21, 2005, three days after their departure, Plexico claimed that only a small number of detainees had been refusing food, and that they had only been doing so for three days.

The lawyers of Guantanamo details later corroborated the details of the Afghans claims, saying that they had been aware of the hunger strike as early as June 23, 2005, but had not been able to say anything because of a DoD gag placed on them.

Borekzai told the Associated Press the detaineesa are protesting because "some of these people say they were mistreated during interrogation. Some say they are innocent." The two Afghans said they had been accused of being members of the former Taliban regime, but both said they were innocent.

== See also ==
- Guantanamo Bay
- Hunger strike
