= Mourad Benchellali =

French citizen

Mourad Benchellali is a French citizen, who was captured by Pakistanis forces and detained in the United States Guantanamo Bay detention camps. His Guantanamo Internment Serial Number was 161.

The elder Benchellali is reported to have directed Mourad, and a friend, Nizar Sassi, to go Afghanistan.

Benchellali was transferred from US custody to French custody in July 2004. Although originally convicted in France, his trial was overturned and he was released in February 2009.

On February 17, 2010, the Court of Cassation, the highest court in France, ordered a re-trial of the five men.

== Accounts of his detention ==
Benchellali has published a book describing his experience traveling to Afghanistan, his capture, and detention. Following the first three suicides at Guantanamo the New York Times published an op-ed by Benchellali, entitled "Detainees in despair".

In the op-ed, Benchellali described how he came to spend two months in an al Qaeda training camp:

In the early summer of 2001, when I was 19, I made the mistake of listening to my older brother and going to Afghanistan on what I thought was a dream vacation. His friends, he said, were going to look after me. They did — channeling me to what turned out to be a Qaeda training camp. For two months, I was there, trapped in the middle of the desert by fear and my own stupidity.

Benchellali said that his training didn't make him an enemy of the United States, that as soon as his course was finished he made his way to the Pakistan border, so he could fly back to France. But, by the time he got there he learned of the al Qaeda attacks of September 11, 2001, and that, as a result, the border was closed. He crossed the border through an unguarded mountain pass, but was soon captured by Pakistani authorities.

Benchellali concluded his op-ed with:

I believe that a small number of the detainees at Guantánamo are guilty of criminal acts, but as analysis of the military's documents on the prisoners has shown, there is no evidence that most of the 465 or so men there have committed hostile acts against the United States or its allies. Even so, what I heard so many times resounding from cage to cage, what I said myself so many times in my moments of complete despondency, was not, "Free us, we are innocent!" but "Judge us for whatever we've done!" There is unlimited cruelty in a system that seems to be unable to free the innocent and unable to punish the guilty.

== The McClatchy interview ==
On June 15, 2008, the McClatchy News Service published articles based on interviews with 66 former Guantanamo captives. McClatchy reporters interviewed Mourad Benchellali in France. Benchellali acknowledged he was born in a radical family, but said he was not a radical believer himself:

It was June 2001, and I thought I'd take a vacation, be back in time for classes in September. Later, the papers would say I was a desperate outsider, trapped looking in on an uncaring nation. But that's not true. I was happy. I was getting an education. I had a job. I had a fiancee. I just thought I wanted a bit of adventure.

During his interview Benchellali described his brother tricking him into traveling to Afghanistan, described what it was like to attend the training camp: a lot praying; lectures on jihad; physical training; some weapons training, which did not include any weapons.

Benchellali described one female interrogator who: "undressed in front of him as she purred questions".

== French trial ==
Benchellali, and four other French citizens, were convicted in 2007 of "criminal association with a terrorist enterprise." They had their convictions overturned on appeal on February 24, 2009. Their convictions were overturned because they were based on interrogations conducted in Guantanamo, and the interrogations were conducted by French security officials, not law enforcement officials. On February 17, 2010, the Court of Cassation, a higher court, ordered a re-trial of the five men.

== Subpoenaing Commandant Geoffrey Miller ==
In February 2014, Benchellali, and his friend Sassi, sought a subpoena to compel testimony from Geoffrey D. Miller, the former Commandant of the Guantanamo camp. The pair's lawyers argued that Miller was responsible for ordering the unauthorized use of interrogation techniques which violated international agreements, and constituted war crimes.

The French court scheduled Miller's appearance for March 2016. Miller didn't appear, which William Bourdon, one of their lawyers, characterized as an "a dual act of contempt against the French judiciary"; because "he both refused to appear and to provide any explanation about his role and that of the US administration."

William J. Haynes, formerly the Pentagon's Chief Legal Counsel, was scheduled to testify in October 2016.

== See also ==
- Nizar Sassi
- Imad Kanouni
- Brahim Yadel
- Karim Bourti
- A Profile of 517 Detainees through Analysis of Department of Defense Data
