= Indonesian detainees at Guantanamo Bay =

Extrajudicial detention by the United States

The United States Department of Defense acknowledges holding two Indonesian detainees in Guantanamo. A total of 778 detainees have been held in extrajudicial detention in the Guantanamo Bay detention camps, in Cuba since the camps opened on January 11, 2002, The camp population peaked in 2004 at approximately 660. Only nineteen new detainees, all "high value detainees" have been transferred there since the United States Supreme Court's ruling in Rasul v. Bush. As of January 2025, at least 780 people from 48 countries have been detained at the camp since its creation, of whom 756 had been released or transferred to other detention facilities, 9 died in custody, and 15 remain.

On September 5, 2006, the only Indonesian in Guantanamo, Riduan Isamuddin, also known as "Hambali", was transferred to Guantanamo from the CIA's network of secret interrogation centers. Isamuddin is currently awaiting trial in a military commission.
