= Adil Hadi bin Hamlili =

Guantanamo Bay detainee

Adil Hadi al Jazairi Bin Hamlili
- Born: 26 June 1976 (age 50); Oran Algeria
- Detained at: Guantanamo
- Other names: Adil Hadi al Jaza'iri Bin Hamlili; Adil al Jazeeri; Adel Hamlily
- ISN: 1452
- Charge: No charge
- Status: Transferred to Algeria

Adil Hadi al Jazairi Bin Hamlili is a citizen of Algeria who was held in extrajudicial detention in the United States Guantanamo Bay detainment camps, in Cuba. The US Department of Defense reports that Bin Hamlili was born on 26 June 1976, in Oram (Oran) [sic] Algeria. His Guantanamo Internment Serial Number was 1452.

The interrogators in Guantanamo Bay believed Bin Hamlili was an Al Qaeda financier and assassin who also worked for the British Intelligence Service MI6 and the Canadian Intelligence Service CSIS.

== Identity ==
Adil Hadi al Jazairi Bin Hamlili's name was spelled inconsistently on various documents released by the United States Department of Defense:

Adil Hadial Al Jazairi Bin Hamlili on the Summary of Evidence memo prepared for his Combatant Status Review Tribunal, on 16 November 2004. Adil Hadi Al-Jaza'iri Bin Hamlili on the Summary of Evidence memo prepared for his first and second annual Administrative Review Board, on 25 August 2005 and on 7 September 2006.

== Combatant Status Review Tribunal ==
A Summary of Evidence memo was prepared for Adil Hadial Al Jazairi Bin Hamlili's Combatant Status Review Tribunal, on 16 November 2004. The memo listed the following allegations against him:

a. The detainee is associated with the Taliban and associated with al Qaida:
1. The detainee worked as a translator for the Taliban Foreign Ministry.
2. The detainee received room and board from the Taliban.
3. The detainee travelled several times between Pakistan and Afghanistan after 11 September 2001.
4. The detainee admitted he had al Qaida connections.
5. The detainee joined a terrorist organization focused on jihad in Algeria.
6. The detainee received a monthly stipend from al Qaida.
7. The detainee was a member of the Algerian Armed Islamic Group.
8. The Armed Islamic Group (GIA) is designated as a Foreign Terrorist Organization.
9. The detainee assassinated Usama bin Ladin's commercial representative to Pakistan, because the representative had violated sharia law.
10. The detainee provided detailed information, on al Qaida and other Islamic groups in Afghanistan, to the Taliban at the request of the Taliban Deputy Minister of Intelligence.
11. The detainee worked as an interpreter for the Sixth Directorate/Branch of Taliban Intelligence several times after 11 September 2001.
12. The detainee provided money to a member of al Qaida in 2003.
13. The detainee provided a rental house in Kabul to al-Zarqawi in 2000.
14. The detainee hosted a senior member of the Taliban Ministry of Interior at the detainee's house in July 2002 and in 2003.
15. The detainee has extensive knowledge of al Qaida attempts to procure nuclear material.

There is no record that Bin Hamlili participated in his Combatant Status Review Tribunal.

== Administrative Review Board hearing ==
=== First annual Administrative Review Board ===
A Summary of Evidence memo was prepared for Adil Hadi Al-Jaza'iri Bin Hamlili's first annual Administrative Review Board, on 25 August 2005. The memo was published in September 2007. It listed 44 "primary factors favoring continued detention", and 2 "primary factors favoring release or transfer".

==== Transcript ====
Bin Hamlili participated in his first annual Administrative Review Board.

=== Second annual Administrative Review Board ===
A Summary of Evidence memo was prepared for Adil Hadi Al-Jaza'iri Bin Hamlili's second annual Administrative Review Board, on 7 September 2006. The memo was published in September 2007. It listed 44 "primary factors favoring continued detention", and 9 "primary factors favoring release or transfer".

== Guantanamo Medical records ==
On 16 March 2007 the Department of Defense published medical records for the captives. According to those records Adil Hadi bin Hamlili was 68 inches tall. According to those records his weight was recorded 29 times between September 2004 and December 2006. According to those records his weight ranged from 151 to 203 pounds. Those records indicated he gained 29 pounds between 20 September 2005 and 22 September. Those records indicated he lost 45 pounds between 11 and 17 July 2006.

== Habeas corpus petition ==
Bin Hamlily had a habeas corpus petition filed on his behalf in 2005. The Department of Defense published documents from the CSR Tribunals of 179 captives; they did not publish any of his habeas documents.

=== Military Commissions Act ===
The Military Commissions Act of 2006 mandated that Guantanamo captives were no longer entitled to access the US civil justice system, so all outstanding habeas corpus petitions were stayed.

=== Boumediene v. Bush ===
On 12 June 2008, the United States Supreme Court ruled, in Boumediene v. Bush, that the Military Commissions Act could not remove the right for Guantanamo captives to access the US Federal Court system. All previous Guantanamo captives' habeas petitions were eligible to be re-instated.

=== Habeas corpus re-initiated ===
Bin Hamlily's attorney's filed requests to re-initiate his habeas petition. According to a status report filed on 18 July 2008, bin Hamlily was captured in June 2003; Bin Hamliy was held for ten months in US custody in Kabul; Bin Hamliy was held for three to four months in the Bagram Theater Internment Facility; Bin Hamlily was transferred to Guantanamo in 2004;

Fellow Guantanamo captive Shaker Aamer initiated the petition on 15 April 2005. On 19 June 2007, his attorneys filed a Petition for Immediate Release (DTA) under the Detainee Treatment Act – Hamlily v. Gates – 07-1225. On 1 July 2008, his attorneys filed an "Amended Petition for Writ of Habeas Corpus".

The Government has not filed a "factual return" in his habeas petition. However, they have filed some response to his DTA petition.transferred to Guantanamo in 2004.

== Return to Algeria ==
Adil Hadi al Jazairi Bin Hamlili and Hasan Zemiri were repatriated to Algeria on 20 January 2010. Carol Rosenberg, writing in the Miami Herald, reported that it was not clear whether the two men had been sent home as free men, or whether they were transferred to Algerian custody. She noted that two other Algerians had been granted asylum, in France, as they had reason to fear a return home.

His lawyer Clive Stafford Smith reported that in 2009, Hamlili was cleared by the Obama administration's review procedure, reflecting a finding that he was "no threat to the US or its coalition partners." With this finding, Hamlili was returned to Algeria on 20 January 2010, as a free man. Clive Stafford Smith said that Hamlili has suffered from a psychotic disorder, and other mental disabilities provoked by alleged abuse in US custody.

In Algeria, Hamlili was tried on terrorism charges but acquitted on 21 February 2010.
