= Ahcene Zemiri =

- Born: 1967 (age 58–59); Algeria
- Citizenship: Canada, France
- Detained at: Guantanamo
- Other name: Hassan Zumiri
- ISN: 533
- Charge: No charge
- Status: Transferred to Algeria
- Spouse: Karina Dereshteanu
- Parents: Karim

Ahcene Zemiri (born 1967), also known as Hassan Zumiri, is an Algerian-Canadian-French citizen who was for seven years a legal resident of Canada, where he lived in Montreal. He and his Canadian wife moved to Afghanistan in July 2001. They were separated when trying to leave in November 2001 and Zemiri was arrested and turned over to United States forces. He was transferred to the United States Guantanamo Bay detention camp in 2002, where he was detained for eight years without charge.

Ahmed Ressam, the terrorist convicted in 2001 of planning the foiled Millennium bombing of the Los Angeles Airport, alleged that Zemiri had been involved in the plot. In late 2006, he recanted his accusation entirely. In January 2010, Zemiri was freed from Guantanamo Bay and repatriated to Algeria.

== Early life and education ==
Ahcene Zemiri was born in Algeria, where he was raised as a Muslim. As a young man he emigrated to Canada.

== Emigration to Canada ==
He settled in Montreal in 1994 and became a legal resident. He married Karina Dereshteanu, a Canadian woman, in 1997.

== Move to Afghanistan ==
In about June 2001, the couple moved to Afghanistan. As fighting increased, in November, they decided to leave because Karina was pregnant. They decided to separate, as they had heard that women and children were being permitted to enter Pakistan safely. They did not see each other again until 2010, years after their son Karim was born. Karina Zemiri believes that bounty hunters picked up her husband and sold him to the Americans, as was commonly done.

== Interrogated by Canadian Security officials in Guantanamo ==
Zemiri was transferred by the Americans to Guantanamo in 2002. Ahmed Ressam, who had been convicted in 2001 of planning the Millennium bombing of the Los Angeles Airport, alleged that Zemiri was involved in the plot.

In 2004, Zemiri was interrogated at Guantanamo by officials of the Canadian Security Intelligence Service (CSIS), after the Canadian government had been informed of his detention. They also interviewed Djamel Ameziane, an Algerian, and Mohamedou Ould Slahi, a Mauritanian, who also were Canadian residents before being captured in Afghanistan and sent to Guantanamo.

While some detainees had reported seeing Canadian officials, the government originally denied it. These accounts were not confirmed until July 2008, after the Canadian Supreme Court ordered the release of certain materials related to the case of the Canadian citizen Omar Khadr, then still a detainee at Guantanamo. The Canadian government was reviewing the role of its CSIS agents, as it was concerned they may have colluded with the US during interrogation under torture. In addition, the US Supreme Court had held that the government was illegally detaining persons at Guantanamo in the period when the CSIS agents had interviewed residents there.

On July 27, 2008, Michelle Shephard, writing in the Toronto Star, reported that Canadian security officials had interviewed Zemiri and two others at Guantanamo in addition to Khadr.

== Writ of habeas corpus ==
In Hamdi v. Rumsfeld (2004), the United States Supreme Court ruled that detainees had the right to review of their cases before an impartial tribunal to determine if they were enemy combatants. The Center for Constitutional Rights organized a program of finding United States lawyers who would agree to serve as the lawyers for Guantanamo captives, while serving writs of habeas corpus on their behalf in federal district court to challenge their detention.

Lawyers from the firm Fredrikson & Byron of Minneapolis agreed to serve pro bono to represent Ahcene Zemiri and met with him in 2005. In the petition for habeas corpus, they asserted that their client had not been a member of the Taliban, al-Qaeda or other terrorist groups; "had no military or terrorist training, and has neither caused nor tried to harm American personnel or property."

To respond to the Court, the Bush administration established Combatant Status Review Tribunals, and from the fall of 2004 through 2005, conducted reviews of detainee cases. In part because of the allegations by Ressam that Zemiri was involved in the LAX plot, although he denied it, the U.S. designated Zemiri as an unlawful enemy combatant and recommended his continued detention.

== Combatant Status Review ==
=== Administrative Review Board ===
Detainees whose Combatant Status Review Tribunal labeled them "enemy combatants" were scheduled for annual Administrative Review Board hearings. These hearings were designed to assess the threat a detainee might pose if released or transferred, and whether there were other factors that warranted his continued detention.

== Recanting of Millennium plot ==
In January 2007, the press reported that Ahmed Ressam, who had been convicted in 2001 of planning the Millennium bombing and alleged that Zemiri was involved in the plot, wrote a letter in November 2006 to the U.S. District Court Judge John C. Coughenour. He said he wanted to "clarify" his allegations against Zemiri and recanted his previous accusations. Coughenour was the Judge who sentenced Ressam.

Ressam wrote:

- "Mr. Hassan Zemiry is innocent and has no relation or connection to the operation I was about to carry out. He also did not know anything about it and he did not assist me in anything, It is true that I have borrowed some money and a camera from him, but this was only a personal loan between me and him. It has nothing to do with my case..."

Ressam explained he had offered false information because he "was in shock and had a severe psychological disorder." Ressam was sentenced to 22 years imprisonment. Reporters suggested at the time of his trial that he was at risk for a life sentence, which was reduced because he cooperated by naming other suspects, such as Zemiri.

According to Jim Dorsey, Zemiri's lawyer, "This letter undercuts what is the most damning allegation against my client by far." Dorsey forwarded a copy of Ressam's letter to American military officials at Guantanamo.

== Appeal through the Canadian Justice system ==
In preparing their habeas corpus cases, the attorneys for Ahcene Zemiri and Mohammedou Slahi, a Mauritanian national who also lived in Canada, appealed through the Canadian Justice system for the release of classified documents about the two men. They were trying to gain access to information gathered by Canada. Both men had been interviewed by Canadian security officials before they went to Afghanistan. The men's lawyers argued that the notes from the men's Canadian interviews would have been used by the United States in building its dossiers against the two men. They had requested the Canadian evidence in order to make their case for the men's freedom in the US Justice system.

In 2009, Justice Edmond Blanchard ruled that since the men were not Canadian citizens, and their connection to Canada was "tenuous", the Canadian Charter of Rights and Freedoms did not apply to them. In a different case, the Supreme Court of Canada had ruled that the Canadian government should publish classified documents which the United States had shared about the Canadian citizen Omar Khadr.

Nathan Whitling, one of the men's Canadian lawyers, predicted that the men's American habeas corpus cases in the United States would be heard before the appeal he planned of Blanchard's ruling could get through the court.

== Return to Algeria ==
Ahcene Zemiri and Adil Hadi al Jazairi Bin Hamlili were returned to Algeria on January 20, 2010, as their country of origin and citizenship. Carol Rosenberg, writing in the Miami Herald, reported that it was not clear whether the two men had been sent home as free men, or whether they were transferred to Algerian security custody. She noted that two other Algerians, former detainees, had been granted asylum in France, because they had reason to fear a return home.
