= Ridouane Khalid =

French citizen (born 1967)

- Born: August 16, 1967 (age 59)
- Citizenship: French
- Detained at: Guantanamo
- Other name: Redouane Khalid
- ISN: 173
- Status: Repatriated

Ridouane Khalid (Arabic: رضوان خالد; born 16 August 1967) is a French citizen who was held in extrajudicial detention in the United States Guantanamo Bay detention camps, in Cuba.

The Department of Defense says his birthdate is August 16, 1967.

Along with Khaled Ben Mustapha and Mustaq Ali Patel, he was the last French citizen held at the base. They were released in March 2005 and placed under formal investigation by a judge in Paris. Khalid has two brothers already under investigation for alleged terrorism-related matters.

Although originally convicted in France, his trial was overturned and he was released in February 2009.

== Habeas corpus petition ==
A writ of habeas corpus, Redouane Khalid v. George W. Bush, was submitted on Redouane Khalid's behalf.

== French trial ==
Redouane Khalid, and four other French citizens, were convicted in 2007 of "criminal association with a terrorist enterprise." They had their convictions overturned on appeal on February 24, 2009. Their convictions were overturned because they were based on interrogations conducted in Guantanamo, and the interrogations were conducted by French security officials, not law enforcement officials.

On February 17, 2010, the Court of Cassation, a higher court, ordered a re-trial of the five men.
