= Lejay, Afghanistan =

Village in Helmand Province, Afghanistan

Lejay
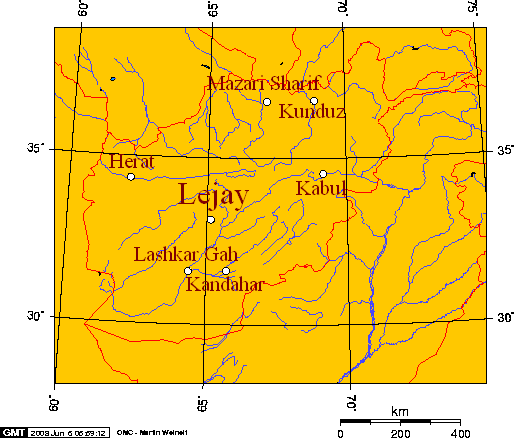
- Lejay, and some major cities of Afghanistan.

- Location in Afghanistan
- Coordinates: 33°09′N 65°08′E
- Country: Afghanistan
- Province: Helmand Province
- Time zone: UTC+4:30

Lejay, Afghanistan is a small village in Helmand Province.

== Taliban ambush ==
Taliban forces in this village executed an ambush on a U.S. Special Forces Reconnaissance element, consisting of seven Green Beret detachments (A-Teams), on February 10, 2003. The subsequent battle, initiated by the ambush, lasted for 43 hours. During this engagement, a multitude of munitions were dropped by CAS (Close Air Support) ranging from 500 lbs to 2000 lbs. Several of the Green Berets received shrapnel and grazing wounds, but none were evacuated from the area. At least 43 Taliban insurgents were killed during the engagement.

The Americans rounded up dozens of prisoners following the battle. By one account, the Americans rounded up 70 Afghans. Another account said they rounded up 40 Afghans. According to the evidence produced at the Combatant Status Review Tribunals, some of the prisoners were sent to the Guantanamo Bay detainment camp, in Cuba.

=== Press reports of the military action in the neighborhood of Lejay ===
Coalition forces conducted an aerial campaign against the neighborhood of Lejay. Haji Pir Mohammad, the deputy governor of Helmand, led a six-man investigative team to the region, to investigate villager's reports of a massive American aerial bombardment.

Colonel Roger King, a US military spokesman, told reporters that the US Special Forces hunting the ambushers believed they were hunting between thirty and one hundred fighters. He informed reporters that American troops had found ammunition casings and empty rocket tubes. He called the reports of civilian casualties "unsupported". He stated that the US aerial bombardment had been confined to caves, and the ridgeline east and west of Lejay.

Press reports of the scale of the bombardment King reported were inconsistent.

- On February 12, 2003, The New York Times quoted King as acknowledging coalition forces dropping almost 20 2,000 pound bombs.
- On February 12, 2003, the Sydney Morning Herald quoted King acknowledging "Close air support was requested, and coalition F-16s dropped five 500-pound bombs."
- On February 13, 2003, Reuters quoted King acknowledging that the US had dropped a single 2,000 pound bomb, and fired ten 105mm cannon rounds from an AC130 aerial gunship.
- On February 13, 2003, The Guardian reported that the region had been subjected to an eight-hour bombardment, from a mixed force of B1 and B52 bombers.
- On February 14, 2003, the BBC quoted King acknowledging that the coalition had dropped four 500 pound bombs.

=== Lejay villagers taken to Guantanamo ===
ID	Name	Notes
966	Baridad	Abdul Bagi called on Baridad's testifimony at his Combatant Status Review Tribunal.; On December 16, 2006, The New York Times reported: "Another returning Afghan, Haji Baridad, who said he did not know his age, spent five years in Guantánamo. He appeared disturbed and kept complaining that an Afghan translator took his money — 3,600 Pakistani rupees, or about $62 — when he was detained."; Other captives apprehended on February 10, 2003, faced the allegation they were captured with a senior Taliban commander, named, alternately Baridad and Bari Dad Khan.
963	Abdul Bagi	
964	Rahmatullah	.
972	Alif Mohammed	.

== See also ==
- Helmand Province
