= Karim Bourti =

French terrorist

Karim Bourti is a citizen of Algeria, and former citizen of France, who was convicted of an association with terrorism. A French court convicted Karim Bourti of association with terrorism in 1998. Karim Bourti is notable for facing long-standing allegations of ties to terrorism.

Time magazine called Karim Bourti: "...a self-described Paris-based recruiter for international jihad." Time says he is the "main Paris operative for the Salafist Group for Preaching and Combat.

French journalist Mohamed Sifaoui used his renewal of a childhood acquaintanceship with Bourti as his path to a three month undercover investigation into militant jihadism in France, entitled, "Mes Freres Assassins". According to Sifaoui, Karim Bourti, and confederates, had planned to attack the 1998 World Football Cup.

Karim Bourti was interrogated about his ties to Richard C. Reid, "the shoe-bomber".

MSNBC reports that Karim Bourti said:

- more "I never buy Coca-Cola because 10, 20 per cent goes to the army of pigs and apes and monkeys. Who are the armies of pigs and apes? The Jews. Allah has turned them into pigs and apes who love tyrants. They kill our brothers, but we will kill them, God willing. Very soon we will kill them."
- "To go on jihad is a favour bestowed by Allah, not just anyone can go. He chooses the martyrs amongst you, so it's a real honour."

Karim Bourti was charged with assault after beating a moderate Muslim cleric in an attempt to extort funds from him.

Pakistan's Daily Times reports that Karim Bourti was so influenced by his religious training in Pakistan that he wore Pakistani clothes upon his return to Europe.

The United States State Department reported that Karim Bourti had been stripped of French citizenship in 2006.

== Proteges ==
Karim Bourti has claimed he recruited former Guantanamo captive Brahim Yadel and Hervé Djamel Loiseau, who was found frozen to death in the Afghan battleground of Tora Bora.
