= Djamel Ameziane =

Algerian citizen, and resident of Canada (born 1967)

Djamel Saiid Ali Ameziane
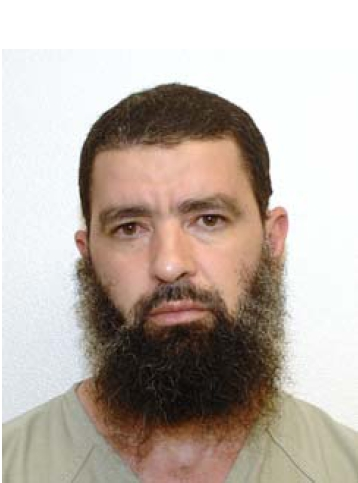
- Djamel Ameziane's Guantanamo mug shot
- Born: February 14, 1967 (age 59); Algiers, Algeria
- Detained at: Guantanamo
- ISN: 310
- Status: transferred to Algeria in 2013
- Occupation: chef

Djamel Saiid Ali Ameziane (born 14 February 1967) is an Algerian citizen, and former resident of Canada and France, who was held in extrajudicial detention in the United States Guantanamo Bay detention camps, in Cuba.

With the assistance of a legal team led by the Burlington, Vermont attorney Robert D. Rachlin, Ameziane launched a writ of habeas corpus, Civil Action No. 05-392 in 2005. Rachlin said in 2006 in relation to material released from the Administrative Review Board on Ameziane:

There's nothing here that shows that he so much as held a firearm or did anything against the United States -- he's one of those guys who were at the wrong place at the wrong time. There's nothing more here than guilt by association.

Djamel Saiid Ali Ameziane was held at Guantanamo for more than 11 years. On December 5, 2013, he was transferred to Algeria, despite his protestations that it was likely that he would be tortured there.

== Life ==
Ameziane was born in Algiers, Algeria in 1967. He went to school there.

In 1992, he left the country because of the Algerian Civil War and moved to Austria, where he worked as a chef until 1995. He was denied a longer work permit. He moved to Canada, entering on a false Dutch passport, where he lived in Montreal and applied for political asylum. After his application was denied in 2000, he moved to Afghanistan.

When the United States invaded Afghanistan in October 2001, Ameziane tried to cross the border to Pakistan to escape the fighting. He was captured by a local tribe and handed over for bounty to Pakistani authorities, who transferred him to United States forces.

== Guantanamo Bay detention camp ==
Ameziane was transferred to Guantanamo Bay detention camp in 2002, and has been held there since without charge.

Documents from his Administrative Review Board were released in March 2006 by the US Department of Defense, along with many others, as a result of a court decision. This was when his and the names of other detainees were made public. The US has alleged that he attended mosques in Montreal where al-Qaeda members prayed, that he was given money to go to Afghanistan by a Tunisian believed to be associated with the movement, and that he stayed in a guest house in Afghanistan used by Taliban fighters from other countries. The US said he had traveled with Taliban fighters, but his attorney said they provided no evidence that he fought against the United States or Northern Alliance.

== Role of Canadian security officials ==
In mid-July 2008, Canadian courts compelled the Canadian government to make available tapes made of the interrogation of Canadian youth Omar Khadr by Canadian security officials in 2004. On July 27, Michelle Shephard, writing in the Toronto Star, reported that other Canadian security officials had interviewed Ahcene Zemiri, Djamel Ameziane and Mohamedou Ould Slahi, three Guantanamo captives who had lived in Canada.

== Habeas corpus petition ==
The Center for Constitutional Rights is one of the organizations that recruited defense attorneys for detainees, who were initially held without recourse to counsel or the United States courts. In Hamdi v. Rumsfeld (2004), the US Supreme Court ruled that US courts did have jurisdiction and that detainees had habeas corpus rights to challenge their detentions before an impartial tribunal.

In 2004 and 2005, the Department of Defense conducted Combatant Status Review Tribunals to assess whether detainees were properly held as enemy combatants. Annual reviews related to continued detention were to be conducted by an Administrative Review Board.

The CCR arranged for an attorney for Ameziane, who filed a writ of habeas corpus, Djamel Said Ali Ameziane v. George Walker Bush, in July 2005 on his behalf in federal court to challenge his detention. His defense attorney, Robert Rachlin, said in 2006 with the release of records of the Administrative Review Board conducted at Guantanamo,

There's nothing here that shows that he so much as held a firearm or did anything against the United States -- he's one of those guys who were at the wrong place at the wrong time. There's nothing more here than guilt by association.

Following the Supreme Court's ruling in Hamdan v. Bush (2006) that the CSRT and military commissions were unconstitutional, Congress passed the Military Commissions Act of 2006. In addition to authorizing the military tribunals, it restricted detainees' use of the habeas corpus process in federal courts, so all pending cases, such as Ameziane's, were stayed.

== Press reports ==
The Globe and Mail suggested that Ameziane's Tunisian contact could have been Raouf Hannachi.

In 2008, Michelle Shephard, writing in the Toronto Star speculated that Ameziane might be transferred to Canada. Shephard wrote that Ameziane might benefit from the 2002 Canada-U.S. Safe Third Country Agreement:

Signed in December 2002, a little-publicized Article 9 of the controversial accord allows the U.S. to send up to 200 migrants to Canada each year. At the time it was signed, it pertained mainly to Haitian and Cuban migrants taken from ships intercepted at sea and housed in Guantanamo.

Shephard's article also addressed the 2005 allegation by the US that Ameziane's attendance at the Al Salaam Mosque in Montreal justified his continued detention, and the 2006 allegation that attendance at the Al Umah Mosque in Montreal justified his continued detention. Wells Dixon, his defense lawyer, said Ameziane acknowledged attending a variety of mosques during the five years he lived in Montreal in the 1990s, but he could no longer remember their names. Dixon challenged the idea that attendance at a mosque, frequented by many people, could be considered sufficient justification by the US government to allege that a person had ties to terrorism requiring indefinite detention as an enemy combatant.

On August 22, 2008, the Canadian Press reported that Ameziane claimed he had been subjected to waterboarding at Guantanamo, a form of water torture. Wells Dixon, one of his lawyers, reported: "... guards at the base placed a water hose between his nose and mouth and ran it for several minutes." The Canadian Press quoted from a letter Ameziane wrote:

I had the impression that my head was sinking in water. I still have psychological injuries, up to this day. Simply thinking of it gives me the chills.

== Calls for his release ==
On October 22, 2008, a coalition of organizations, including Montreal's Anglican Diocese, and human rights groups such as Amnesty International, issued a press release about their plans to sponsor Ameziane's request for entry to Canada as a refugee.

On February 10, 2009, CBC News confirmed that Ameziane was among the five detainees at Guantanamo to have a refugee-sponsoring group working on his behalf. The other four men were Maassoum Abdah Mouhammad, a Syrian Kurd; Hassan Anvar and two Uyghur captives from Guantanamo.

On April 17, 2009, the Anglican Journal quoted human rights workers and church officials about the delay in Ameziane's repatriation. Janet Dench of the Canadian Council for Refugees speculated in April 2009 that Ameziane's repatriation had been stalled by the new reviews of the Guantanamo captives ordered by United States President Barack Obama.

No one has formally and officially said that it is waiting for the U.S. to do their internal review but ... Once they’ve done the reviews, then they’ll be starting to think about "how do we find solutions for all of the people in Guantánamo and how do we involve these different other countries that might play a role?"

Barry Clarke, Bishop of the Anglican diocese of Montreal, which is helping to sponsor Ameziane, wrote about how he responded to Canadians critical of the Church's initiative on the detainee's behalf. He called Ameziane's captivity in Guantanamo "an injustice". He acknowledged that he couldn't guarantee that Ameziane was not tied to terrorism. But he said his workers, and other human rights groups, had looked into his background. The article quoted the conclusions of the Center for Constitutional Rights:

As a foreigner in a land soon torn apart by conflict, he was an easy target for corrupt local police who captured him while he was trying to cross the border into Pakistan. Mr. Ameziane was then sold to U.S. military forces for a bounty.

On March 30, 2012, the Inter-American Commission on Human Rights announced it would be taking up Ameziane's case. According to The Jurist, the IACHR "will investigate whether the US's failure to transfer Ameziane is in compliance with international human rights law."

== Repatriation ==
On December 5, 2013, he was transferred to Algeria, despite his protestations that it was likely that he would be tortured there.

Since his return to Algeria, Ameziane has been monitored by the International Committee of the Red Cross office in Algeria. He has to date not suffered any injustice or persecution, and is self-supporting.

On July 21, 2014, U.S. District Judge Ellen Segal Huvelle turned down a request from Ameziane for the USA to return the funds—the equivalent in $8,838 in US dollars—that he had when he was captured. Jason Leopold, writing about his petition, noted that it had not been known until Ameziane's petition that the seizure of assets had been US policy for all captives. Leopold quoted Gabor Rona and Eugene Fidell in arguing that the seizure of captive's financial assets was a form of looting or pillaging -- war crimes explicitly prohibited by the Geneva Conventions.

== Artwork ==
While detained at Guantanamo Bay, Ameziane created two untitled paintings, one which depicts a Shipwrecked Boat, and the other which depicts buildings on a shore. The painting which depicts a shipwrecked boat is one of seven works created by Guantanamo Bay inmates, that are displayed at John Jay College, New York, in the autumn of 2017.
