= Khaled Ben Mustafa =

- Charge: extrajudicial detention

Khaled Ben Mustafa is a citizen of France who was held in extrajudicial detention in the United States Guantanamo Bay detainment camps, in Cuba. The Department of Defense reports that Mustafa was born on January 9, 1972, in Lyon, France. His Guantanamo Internment Serial Number was 236.

Although originally convicted in France, his trial was overturned and he was released in February 2009. On February 17, 2010, the Court of Cassation, a higher court, ordered a re-trial of Khaled Ben Mustafa and four other men. On January 18, 2012, Sophie Clement, the investigating magistrate in Ben Mustafa's case, requested permission from the US to travel to Guantanamo to investigate the claims Ben Mustafa and other men had made that they were tortured there.

== Official status reviews ==
A Summary of Evidence memo was prepared for his tribunal. The memo accused him of the following:

a. The detainee is a member of al Qaida and supported military operations against the United States or its coalition partners:

1. In July 2001, and using a falsified Pakistani travel visa, the detainee traveled from France to London to Pakistan and finally into Jalalabad, Afghanistan.
2. The detainee traveled with other al Qaida recruits, but they were instructed to "ignore each other during the voyage."
3. When the detainee arrived in Jalalabad, he and his traveling companions were sent to the "House of the Algerians."
4. While at this location, an instructor showed the detainee how to de-assemble and re-assemble a Kalashnikov.
5. In August 2001, the detainee left by taxi for Kandahar, Afghanistan, via Kabul, to begin their training.
6. The detainee waited for ten days in Kandahar so that a larger group of around thirty people could jointly undergo training, but soon traveled back to Jalalabad.
7. In November, as the city of Jalalabad was falling, the detainee escaped to the Tora Bora Mountains and remained there during the bombardment by coalition forces.
8. The Pakistani Military Authorities arrested the detainee as he and a group of other men were trying to cross the border from Afghanistan into Pakistan.

=== Formerly secret Joint Task Force Guantanamo assessment ===
On April 25, 2011, whistleblower organization WikiLeaks published formerly secret assessments drafted by Joint Task Force Guantanamo analysts. Ben Mustafa assessment was three pages long, and recommended transfer to another country. His assessment was signed by camp commandant Jay W. Hood.

== Comments on the June 10, 2006 simultaneous death of three Guantanamo detainees ==
On June 23, 2006, Mustafa wrote about the deaths of the three detainees Mana Shaman Allabardi al Tabi, Yasser Talal al Zahrani and Ali Abdullah Ahmed who died on June 10, 2006, in Guantanamo. Mustafa knew all three men. He said Yasser had invited him to visit him, in Saudi Arabia, once they were released. This suggested to Mustafa that Yasser really didn't commit suicide. Mustafa said all three men had memorized the entire Koran.

== French trial ==
Khaled Ben Mustafa, and four other French citizens, were convicted in 2007 of "criminal association with a terrorist enterprise." They had their convictions overturned on appeal on February 24, 2009. Their convictions were overturned because they were based on interrogations conducted in Guantanamo, and the interrogations were conducted by French security officials, not law enforcement officials.

On February 17, 2010, a higher court of appeals, the Court of Cessations, re-instated the charges against the six men. On January 20, 2011, Mustafa's lawyers cited diplomatic cables published by whistleblower organization WikiLeaks which they argued showed inappropriate cooperation between French and American officials. On January 18, 2012, Sophie Clement, the Chief Investigating Magistrate in the six men's case, requested permission to go to Guantanamo, to investigate the claims of Ben Mustafa and the other men that they had been tortured. She requested access to the internal documents about the men. According to the Associated Press, Philippe Meilhac, Ben Mustafa's lawyer, described Clement's request as "unprecedented":

This [request] is unprecedented. But it's normal that the judge leading the investigation approach those concerned at Guantanamo to verify these claims.
