= List of Saudi detainees at Guantanamo Bay =

A total of 134 Saudi citizens have been held in the United States' Guantanamo Bay detention camps at its naval base in Cuba since January 2002. Most had been swept up in Afghanistan following the US invasion in the fall of 2001, and they were classified by the US government as enemy combatants.

In addition, a United States citizen, Yaser Esam Hamdi, who was born in Louisiana but moved as a child with his parents to Saudi Arabia, where he also had citizenship, was initially held there. As an American citizen, he was transferred to a military prison brig on the mainland of the United States. His challenge to his detention, without being informed of charges or brought to trial, was a case that reached the United States Supreme Court. In Hamdi v. Rumsfeld (2004), the Supreme Court ruled that detainees who are U.S. citizens must have the rights of due process, and the ability to challenge their enemy combatant status before an impartial authority. After this decision, the government made a deal with Hamdi. After he agreed to renounce his US citizenship and observe travel restrictions, in October 2004 Hamdi was deported to Saudi Arabia. He has returned to his family.

Following the deaths of two Saudi citizens in custody on June 10, 2006, and another on May 30, 2007, which the Department of Defense claimed were due to suicides, the Saudi government put pressure on the United States to release its citizens. Nearly 100 were returned to Saudi Arabia from June 2006 through 2007.

Two Saudi citizens are believed to still be held at the detention camp as of January 2024.

== History ==
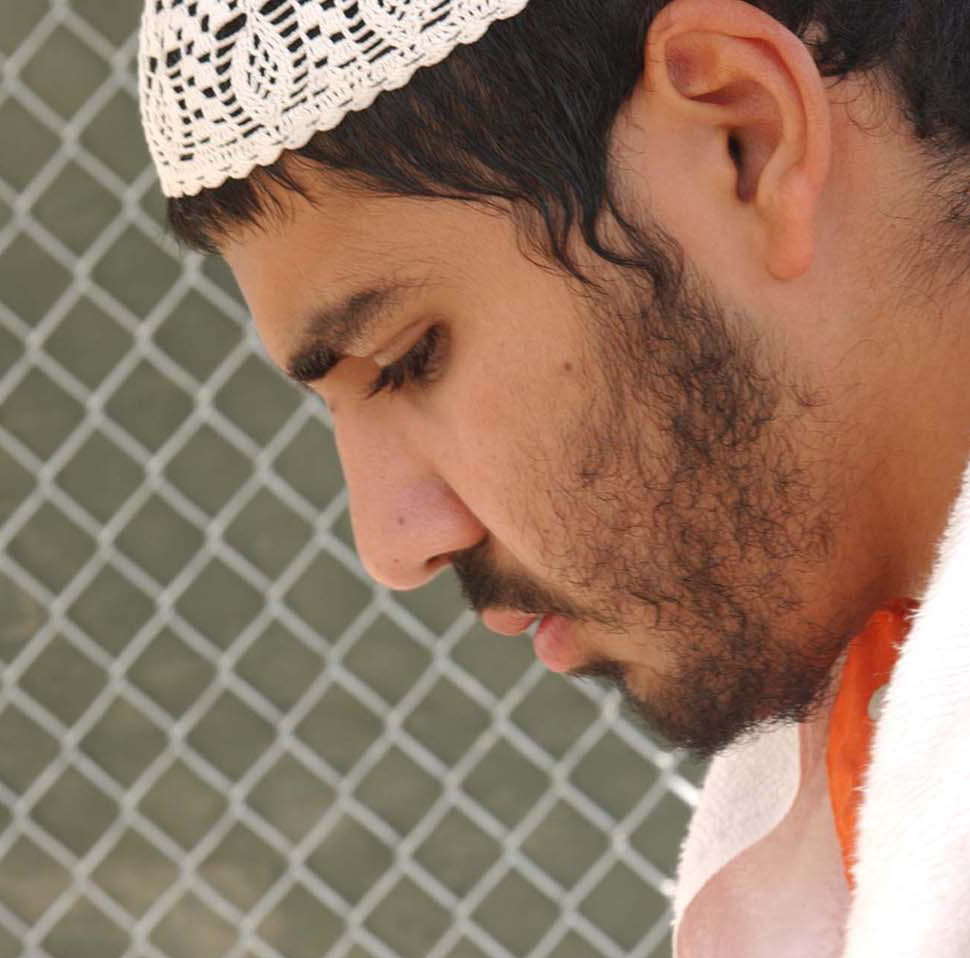
Yaser Esam Hamdi, a former US citizen from Saudi Arabia at the Guantanamo Bay detainment camp in April 2002

In January 2002, the United States completed the first phase of construction of the Guantanamo Bay detention camp at its naval base in Cuba. It was designed to hold enemy combatants captured in its war on terror - most taken during action in Afghanistan beginning in the fall of 2001. In total, the US has held 133 Saudi Arabian citizens at Guantanamo. The United States has held a total of 778 detainees in the Guantanamo Bay detention camps at its naval base in Cuba since the camps opened on January 11, 2002. The camp population peaked in 2004 at approximately 660. As of January 6, 2025, 15 detainees remain at Guantanamo Bay.

Three Saudis: Yasser Talal Al Zahrani, Mani Shaman Turki al-Habardi Al-Utaybi and Abdul Rahman al-Amri, died at Guantanamo in 2006 and 2007 during their detention. All were announced by the United States Department of Defense (DOD) as suicides.

The first two were among three men who died on June 10, 2006; the circumstances of their deaths have been strongly questioned by numerous sources, including the Saudi government and the men's families. Journalists and the Center for Policy and Research in its 2009 report have noted glaring inconsistencies in the NCIS report of 2008. Based on an account by four former guards at Guantanamo, Scott Horton suggested in 2010 that the men died as a result of torture and government agencies tried to cover this up. Al-Amri died on May 30, 2007, an apparent suicide, according to the United States DOD.

As a result of these deaths, the Saudi government strongly pressured the United States to repatriate its citizens. It developed a reintegration program for former detainees and has worked with them on religious re-education, and reintegrating them into society by arranging for marriages and jobs. From June 2006 and December 2007, a total of 93 Saudi citizens were returned to the country. As of today, two Saudi citizens are still held at the detention camp.

== Saudi citizens held in Guantanamo ==
release date	isn	name	notes
2007-12-29	00005	Abdul Aziz Al Matrafi	
2007-07-16	00013	Fahed Nasser Mohamed	Reports being tortured in custody.; Reports being sold for a bounty.; Repatriated on July 16, 2007, with fifteen other men.
2007-02-20	00025	Majeed Abdullah Al Joudi	Defense Department's April 7, 2009, analysis of Guantanamo recidivists lists Joudi as a "confirmed" recidivist.
2015-09-21	00042	Abdul Rahman Shalabi	On hunger strike for more than five years. Reportedly suffering health problems caused by the hunger strike. Shalabi has been force fed for many years by means of strapping him forcefully into a restraint chair and pumping liquid nutrients through his nose into his stomach. Shalabi said after enduring this procedure for over four years, it causes him extreme pain and he feels as if he is treated like an animal.
Held	00049	Assem Matruq Mohammad Al Aasmi	
2007-09-05	00051	Majid Al Barayan	
2007-07-15	00053	Saud Dakhil Allah Muslih Al Mahayawi	
2006-12-13	00055	Muhammed Yahia Mosin Al Zayla	
2006-06-24	00058	Musa Abed Al Wahab	
2007-11-09	00059	Sultan Ahmed Dirdeer Musa Al Uwaydha	
2007-07-15	00062	Muhamad Naji Subhi Al Juhani	Described as having "no ties to militancy whatsoever".
2022-03-06	00063	Mohammed al-Qahtani	Allegedly tried to enter the United States to take part in the September 11 attacks as the 20th hijacker.; Tortured in Guantanamo.
2006-05-18	00064	Abdel Hadi Mohammed Badan Al Sebaii Sebaii	Allegedly built mosques in Bosnia.; Claims he was sold, for a bounty.
2007-07-15	00066	Yahya Samil Al Suwaymil Al Sulami	Described as having "no ties to militancy whatsoever".
2007-11-09	00068	Khalid Saud Abd Al Rahman Al Bawardi	
2003-05-14	00071	Mish'al Muhammad Rashid Al-Shedocky	Released prior to the institution of the Combatant Status Review Tribunals in July 2004.; One of 11 former Guantanamo detainees listed on the Kingdom of Saudi Arabia's most wanted list in February 2009; In 2014, AQAP indicated in a three-part documentary about the group's former deputy leader Said Ali al-Shihri's life and death that al-Shedocky was dead by having the phrase "May Allah accept him" posted next to his name. The phrase is reserved for jihadists who have been killed in battle. The group did not provide any details on al-Shedocky's death.
2006-06-24	00073	Yusif Khalil Abdallah Nur	
2007-12-28	00074	Mesh Arsad Al Rashid	Repatriated on December 2, 2007, with nine other men.
2007-09-05	00079	Fahed Al Harazi	
2003-05-14	00080	Fahd Abdallah Ibrahim Al-Shabani	Released prior to the institution of the Combatant Status Review Tribunals in July 2004.
Died in custody	00093	Yasser Talal Al Zahrani	US government withheld body parts needed for independent post mortem.
2006-05-18	00094	Ibrahim Daif Allah Neman Al Sehli	Released May 19, 2006.
2006-05-18	00095	Abdul Rahman Ahmed Uthman	
2006-06-24	00096	Muhammad Surur Dakhilallah Al Utaybi	
2006-05-18	00105	Adnan Muhammed Ali Al Saigh	One of 11 former Guantanamo detainees listed on the Kingdom of Saudi Arabia's most wanted list in February 2009; Turned himself in to Saudi authorities July 2012; author of "The Fight over the Mountains" for Inspire magazine, Summer 2010 issue.
2006-12-13	00109	Yusef Abdullah Saleh Al Rabiesh	
2007-09-05	00112	Abdul Aziz Saad Al Khaldi	
2007-11-09	00114	Yussef Mohammed Mubarak Al Shihri	14 years old when captured.; Killed in a shootout with Saudi security forces along the Saudi border with Yemen in October 2009.; When killed, Yousef al Shihri was dressed as a woman; Shihri's female garments concealed a suicide explosives belt
2006-12-13	00121	Salman Saad Al Khadi Mohammed	Released with thirteen other men on November 12, 2007.
2007-07-15	00122	Bijad Thif Allah Al Atabi	Repatriated on July 16, 2007, with fifteen other men.; Present during the riot at Mazari Sharif.
2003-05-14	00125	Fawaz Abd Al Aziz Al Zahrani	Repatriated on May 15, 2003, and then convicted of leaving Saudi Arabia without getting prior permission.
2007-09-05	00126	Salam Abdullah Said	
2003-05-14	00127	Ibrahim Rushdan Brayk Al Shili	Released prior to the institution of the Combatant Status Review Tribunals in July 2004.
2007-11-09	00130	Faha Sultan	
2006-06-24	00132	Abdul Salam Gaithan Mureef Al Shehry	17 years old when captured.
2007-07-15	00154	Mazin Salih Musaid Al Awfi	Repatriated on July 16, 2007, with fifteen other men.
2005-07-19	00155	Khalid Sulaymanjaydh Al Hubayshi	There is no record this captive participated in his Combatant Status Review Tribunal.
2006/05/19	00157	Saed Khatem Al Malki	Repatriated May 19, 2006.
2007-02-20	00158	Majid Abdallah Husayn Muhammad Al Samluli Al Harbi	
2007-09-28	00172	Ali Muhammed Nasir Mohammed	
2007-02-20	00176	Majid Aydha Muhammad Al Qurayshi	
2006-05-18	00177	Fahd Salih Sulayman Al Jutayli	Was a minor when captured.; Reportedly killed in a shootout between the Yemeni Army and Houthi rebels in 2009
2007-07-15	00179	Abdul Rahman Owaid Mohammad Al Juaid	Repatriated on July 16, 2007, with fifteen other men.; Described as having "no ties to militancy whatsoever".
2005-11-04	00181	Maji Afas Radhi Al Shimri	There is no record this captive participated in his Combatant Status Review Tribunal.
2007-07-15	00182	Bandar Ahmad Mubarak Al Jabri	Repatriated on July 16, 2007, with fifteen other men.
2006-06-24	00184	Othman Ahmed Othman Al Omairah	Following his transfer, reportedly became an operational commander for al-Qaida in the Arabian Peninsula
2007-11-09	00185	Turki Mash Awi Zayid Al Asiri	Allegedly fled from the American aerial bombardment of Afghanistan.; One of 11 former Guantanamo detainees listed on the Kingdom of Saudi Arabia's most wanted list in February 2009
2007-02-20	00186	Rashed Awad Khalaf Balkhair	There is no record this captive participated in his Combatant Status Review Tribunal.
2007-11-09	00187	Murtadha Al Said Makram	One of 11 former Guantanamo detainees listed on the Kingdom of Saudi Arabia's most wanted list in February 2009
2006-12-13	00188	Jabir Jubran Al Fayfi	One of 11 former Guantanamo detainees listed on the Kingdom of Saudi Arabia's most wanted list in February 2009
2006-06-24	00191	Saleh Ali Jaid Al Khathami	
2006-12-13	00192	Ibrahim Sulayman Muhammad Arbaysh	Repatriated on December 14, 2006.; Following Repatriation, reportedly became al-Qaida in the Arabian Peninsula's chief theologian and ideologue, responsible for justifying terrorism on religious grounds
2016-01-11	00195	Mohammad Al Rahman Al Shumrani	
2007-09-05	00196	Musa Ali Said Al Said Al Amari	
Died in custody	00199	Abdul Rahman Ma Ath Thafir Al Amri	
Held	00200	Said Muhammad Husayn Qahtani	
2007-07-15	00204	Said Ibrahim Ramzi Al Zahrani	
2006-12-13	00206	Abdullah Muahammed Abdel Aziz	
2005-07-19	00207	Mishal Awad Sayaf Alhabiri	Suffered serious brain damage in Guantanamo.; Alleged serious beatings in Guantanamo.
2007-07-15	00214	Muhammad Abd Al Rahman Al Kurash	
2007-11-09	00215	Fahd Umr Abd Al Majid Al Sharif	
2007-12-28	00216	Jamil Ali Al Kabi	There is no record this captive participated in his Combatant Status Review Tribunal.
2007-09-05	00218	Fahd Muhammed Abdullah Al Fouzan	in extrajudicial detention in Guantanamo Bay detainment camp because he attended an "Abu Nasir military camp".
2006-12-13	00226	Anwar Al Nurr	There is no record this captive participated in his Combatant Status Review Tribunal.
2007-07-15	00230	Humud Dakhil Humud Sa'id Al-Jad'an	Claims he was sold for a bounty.; Repatriated on July 16, 2007, with fifteen other men.; Listed in the DoD's April 2009 recidivism analysis as a "suspected" recidivist.
2007-09-05	00231	Abdulhadi Abdallah Ibrahim al Sharakh	There is no record this captive participated in his Combatant Status Review Tribunal.; Included in the DoD's April 2009 analysis as a "suspected" recidivist due to his September 2008 arrest "for association with terrorist members" and "supporting terrorism."
2007-07-15	00234	Khalid Mohammed Al Zaharni	There is no record this captive participated in his Combatant Status Review Tribunal.; Repatriated on July 16, 2007, with fifteen other men.
2015-10-30	00239	Shaker Aamer	Alleges abuse.; Mental health at risk.
Held	00240	Abdullah Yahia Yousf Al Shabli	
2007-12-28	00243	Abdullah Ali Al Utaybi	
2006-12-13	00245	Al Silm Haji Hajjaj Awwad Al Hajjaji	
2005-07-19	00248	Saleh Abdall Al Oshan	Determined not to have been an enemy combatant.
2007-11-09	00258	Nayif Abdallah Ibrahim Ibrahim	There is no record this captive participated in his Combatant Status Review Tribunal.
2007-07-15	00261	Juma Mohammed Abdul Latif Al Dosari	Allegedly delivered a fiery speech in Buffalo NY that was attended by members of the Lackawanna Six.; Says he has been tortured, and has made over a dozen suicide attempts.; Joint citizen of both Bahrain and Saudi Arabia.
2007-11-09	00262	Abdullah Abd Al Mu'in Al Wafti	There is no record this captive participated in his Combatant Status Review Tribunal.
2006-06-24	00264	Abdul Aziz Abdul Rahman Abdul Aziz Al Baddah	
2006-06-24	00265	Tariqe Shallah Hassan Al Harbi	
2006-06-24	00266	Abdallah Muhammad Salih Al Ghanimi	
2007-12-28	00268	Abdul Rahman Nashi Badi Al Hataybi	
2006-06-24	00271	Ibrahim Muhammed Ibrahim Al Nasir	
2007-12-28	00272	Zaid Binsallah Mohammed Il Bhawith	Repatriated on December 2, 2007, with nine other men.
2006-12-13	00273	Abd Al Aziz Muhammad Ibrahim Al Nasir	
2007-09-05	00274	Bader Al Bakri Al Samiri	
2006-12-13	00286	Ziad Said Farg Jahdari	Repatriated on December 14, 2006.
2005-09-30	00287	Sami Abdul Aziz Salim Allaithy	Alleges a guard jumped on his spine putting him in a wheel chair.; Determined not to have been an enemy combatant.
2006-05-18	00308	Adil Uqla Hassan Al Nusayri	Claims he was captured by the Taliban, who sold him to bounty hunters, who in turn sold him to the Americans.; Repatriated on December 14, 2006.
2007-09-05	00318	Rami Bin Said Al Taibi	
2006-05-18	00319	Mohammed Jayed Sebai	Repatriated together with fourteen other men on May 19, 2006.
2007-09-05	00322	Khalid Hassan Husayn Al Barakat	
2010-o9-16	00331	Ohmed Ahmed Mahamoud Al Shurfa	
2007-07-15	00332	Abdullah Al Tayabi	Repatriated on July 16, 2007, with fifteen other men.
2007-11-09	00333	Mohamed Atiq Awayd Al Harbi	After transfer from Guantanamo Bay, became a leader of al-Qaida in the Arabian Peninsula (AQAP); One of 11 former Guantanamo detainees listed on the Kingdom of Saudi Arabia's most wanted list in February 2009 He surrendered to Saudi authorities that same month.
2009-06-12	00335	Kahlid Saad Mohammed	Allegedly injured by the American aerial bombardment of Afghanistan, 2001, while distributing humanitarian aid to refugees.
2006-12-13	00336	Majed Hamad Al Frih	There is no record this captive participated in his Combatant Status Review Tribunal.
2006-06-24	00337	Sa ad Ibraham Sa ad Al Bidna	
2006-06-24	00338	Wasim aka Wasm Awwad Omar Al-Wasm	His habeas corpus was "administrative closed" on January 31, 2007.
2006-05-18	00339	Khalid Abdallah Abdel Rahman Al Morghi	
2006-12-13	00340	Bessam Muhammed Saleh Al Dubaikey	Claims that a head injury left him with mental problems.
2006-12-13	00341	Said Ali Al Farha	There is no record this captive participated in his Combatant Status Review Tribunal.
2007-09-05	00342	Mohammed Mubarek Salah Al Qurbi	
2006-05-18	00343	Abdallah Ibrahim Al Rushaydan	
2006-06-24	00344	Rashid Abdul Mosleh Qayed	
2006-05-18	00346	Said Bezan Ashek Shayban	
2007-09-05	00368	Amran Baqur Mohammed Hawsawi	Was injured during the American aerial bombardment of Afghanistan, 2001.
2007-07-15	00370	Abd Al Hizani	
2007-11-09	00372	Sa Id Ali Jabir Al Khathim Al Shihri	Was the #2 in al-Qaeda in the Arabian Peninsula; Reportedly responsible for the attack on Flight 253 on Christmas Day 2009; May have been involved in al-Qieda's attack on the American embassy in Sanaa in September 2008; One of 11 former Guantanamo detainees listed on the Kingdom of Saudi Arabia's most wanted list in February 2009; Killed in a drone strike in Yemen in 2013.
2007-12-28	00436	Nayif Fahd Mutliq Al Usaymi	
2007-02-20	00437	Faizal Saha Al Nasir	
2007-11-09	00438	Hani Saiid Mohammad Al Khalif	
2007-12-28	00439	Khalid Malu Shia Al Ghatani	Was a minor when captured.
2017-01-05	00440	Mohammed Ali Abdullah Bwazir	Explained that the allegations arose from a false confession beaten out of them by General Dostum's forces.; The Center for Constitutional Rights filed an emergency injunction in an attempt to ease what they described as the brutality of the force-feedings imposed upon hunger strikers.
2007-09-05	00493	Abdul Hakim Bukhary	Passed straight from detention in a Taliban prison to detention in an American prison.; A Saudi named Abdel-Hakee Abdel-Karim Ameen Bukhari was repatriated on September 16, 2007.
2006-05-18	00501	Nawwaf Fahd Humood Al-Otaibi	Repatriated together with fourteen other men on May 19, 2006.
2006-05-18	00505	Khalid Rashd Ali Al Muri	There is no record this captive participated in his Combatant Status Review Tribunal.; Repatriated together with fourteen other men on May 19, 2006.
2006-12-13	00507	Sultan Sari Sayel Al Anazi	Claimed he was sold for a bounty.
2006-12-13	00513	Abdul Rahman Mohammed Hussein Khowlanpp	
2007-09-05	00514	Abdallah Faris Al Unazi Thani	There is no record this captive participated in his Combatant Status Review Tribunal.
2007-07-15	00516	Ghanim Abdul Rahman Al Harbi	Repatriated to Saudi custody, with fifteen other men, on July 16, 2007.
2007-02-20	00536	Mohamed Abdullah Al Harbi	Released with thirteen other men on November 12, 2007.
Held	00553	Abdul Khaled Ahmed Sahleh Al Bedani	
2007-12-28	00565	Abdul Hakim Abdul Rahman Abdulaziz Al Mousa	
Held	00566	Mansoor Muhammed Ali Qattaa	
2007-07-16	00570	Sabri Mohammed Ebrahim Al Qurashi	
Held	00572	Slah Muhamed Salih Al Zabe	
2003-05-14	00585	Ibrahim Umar Ali Al Umar	Released prior to the institution of the Combatant Status Review Tribunals in July 2004.
Died in custody	00588	Mana Shaman Allabardi Al Tabi	Seventeen years old when captured.; Was on a hunger strike for over nine months, before his death was reported on June 10, 2006.
2007-09-05	00647	Zaban Thaaher Zaban Al Shamaree	There is no record this captive participated in his Combatant Status Review Tribunal.
2007-11-09	00650	Jabir Hasan Muhamed Al Qahtani	
2006-05-18	00652	Abdullah Hamid Al Qahtani	Repatriated together with fourteen other men on May 19, 2006.
2006-05-18	00664	Rashid Awad Rashid Al Uwaydah	Repatriated together with fourteen other men on May 19, 2006.
2009-06-12	00669	Ahmed Zaid Salim Zuhair	Repatriated on June 12, 2009, with two other men.
Held	00682	Ghassan Abdallah Ghazi Al Shirbi	Faces charges before a military commission.
2009-06-12	00687	Abdalaziz Kareem Salim Al Noofayaee	Repatriated on June 12, 2009, with two other men.
2017-01-18	00696	Jabran Said Wazar Al Qahtani	There is no record this captive participated in his Combatant Status Review Tribunal.; Faces charges before a military commission.
2014-11-22	00713	Muhammed Murdi Issa Al Zahrani	There is no record this captive participated in his Combatant Status Review Tribunal.
2018-05-02	00768	Ahmed Muhammed Haza Al Darbi	Testified for the court martial of Damien Corsetti, one of the soldiers accused of a role in the Bagram torture and prisoner abuse scandal where two captives were beaten to death.
Held	00893	Tolfiq Nassar Ahmed Al Bihani	There is no record this captive participated in his Combatant Status Review Tribunal.
Held	01456	Hassan Mohammed Salih Bin Attash	Human rights groups report he was kept in "the dark prison".; Was a minor when captured.; Human rights groups suggest he was captured just because his older brother was a member of al Qaeda.

== Saudi rehabilitation ==
A July 26, 2007, article from Asharq Alawsat described the Care Rehabilitation Center repatriated detainees are held in until they are finally released. According to the article the detainees received special meals, had access to satellite TV, and were able to get day passes.

British Prime Minister Gordon Brown visited the facility on November 2, 2008, and spoke with several former Guantanamo detainees.
