= Daniel Mann (lawyer) =

American lawyer

- Born: 1980 (age 45–46); Illinois, U.S.
- Education: George Mason University (BA); Seton Hall University (JD)
- Occupation: Lawyer

Daniel Mann (born 1980 in Illinois) is a lawyer in Newark, New Jersey and a fellow of the Seton Hall Center for Policy and Research at Seton Hall University School of Law. He also gained public exposure beyond the legal and academic communities with his co-authorship of "Report on Guantanamo Detainees, A Profile of 517 Detainees through Analysis of Department of Defense Data," co-authored with Professor Mark Denbeaux, son, Joshua Denbeaux, and four credited co-authors, commonly referred to as the "Denbeaux Study." Additional Guantanamo studies were to follow, including:

- Inter- and Intra-Departmental Disagreements About Who Is Our Enemy, March 20, 2006
- The Guantanamo Detainees During Detention, July 10, 2006
- June 10th Suicides at Guantánamo, August 21, 2006
- No-hearing hearings, November 17, 2006

== Education ==
- B.A., 2003, George Mason University
- J.D., 2008, Seton Hall University School of Law

As one of the fellows of the Center for Research and Policy at Seton Hall Law school his work focused on the study of government data to illuminate the interrogations and intelligence practices of the United States. The reports have been introduced into the Congressional record by the Senate Armed Services Committee, the Senate Judiciary Committee, the House Armed Services Committee, and as part of a Resolution by the European Parliament.

== Articles ==
Mann is the co-author of many significant articles. This is a partial list:

- "Profile of Released Guantánamo: The Government's Story Then and Now", August 4, 2008 (As Contributor, with Mark Denbeaux, Joshua Denbeaux, Adam Deutsch, James Hlavenka, Gabrielle Hughes, Brianna Kostecka, Michael Patterson, Paul Taylor, and Anthony Torntore).
- "Justice Scalia, the Department of Defense, and The Perpetuation of an Urban Legend: The Truth about Recidivism of Released Guantánamo Detainees", June 16, 2008 (As Contributor, with Mark Denbeaux, Joshua Denbeaux, Daniel Lorenzo, Mark Muoio, Grace Brown, Jennifer Ellick, Jillian Camarote, Douglas Eadie, and Paul Taylor).
- "Captured on Tape: Interrogation and Videotaping of Detainees in Guantánamo", February 7, 2008 (As Contributor, with Mark Denbeaux, Joshua Denbeaux, Jennifer Ellick, Michael Ricciardelli, Matthew Darby).
- "The Meaning of "Battlefield": An Analysis of the Government’s Representations of ‘Battlefield Capture’ and ‘Recidivism’ of the Guantánamo Detainees", December 10, 2007 (As Contributor, with Mark Denbeaux, Joshua Denbeaux, Grace Brown, Jillian Camarote, Douglas Eadie, Jennifer Ellick, Daniel Lorenzo, Mark Muoio, Courtney Ray, and Nebroisa Zlatanovic).
- "No Hearing-Hearings", November 17, 2006 (with Mark Denbeaux, Joshua Denbeaux, David Gratz, John Gregorek, Matthew Darby, Shana Edwards, Shane Hartman, Megan Sassaman and Helen Skinner).
- "June 10 Suicides at Guantánamo", August 21, 2006 (with Mark Denbeaux, Joshua Denbeaux, David Gratz, John Gregorek, Matthew Darby, Shana Edwards, Shane Hartman, Megan Sassaman and Helen Skinner).
- "Report on Guantanamo Detainees, A Profile of 517 Detainees through Analysis of Department of Defense Data", February 8, 2006 (with Mark Denbeaux, Joshua Denbeaux, David Gratz, John Gregorek, Matthew Darby, Shana Edwards, Shane Hartman, and Helen Skinner).
- "Second Report on the Guantanamo Detainees: Inter and Intra Departmental Disagreements About Who Is Our Enemy", March 20, 2006 (with Mark Denbeaux, Joshua Denbeaux, David Gratz, John Gregorek, Matthew Darby, Shana Edwards, Shane Hartman, and Helen Skinner).
- "The Guantanamo Detainees During Detention", July 10, 2006 (with Mark Denbeaux, Joshua Denbeaux, David Gratz, John Gregorek, Matthew Darby, Shana Edwards, Shane Hartman, Megan Sassaman, and Helen Skinner).
- "June 10 Suicides at Guantanamo", August 21, 2006 (with Mark Denbeaux, Joshua Denbeaux, David Gratz, John Gregorek, Matthew Darby, Shana Edwards, Shane Hartman, Megan Sassaman, and Helen Skinner).
- "No-hearing hearings", November 17, 2006 (with Mark Denbeaux, Joshua Denbeaux, David Gratz, John Gregorek, Matthew Darby, Shana Edwards, Shane Hartman, Megan Sassaman, and Helen Skinner).
