= Al-Qaeda safe house =

Safe house operated by the terrorist organization

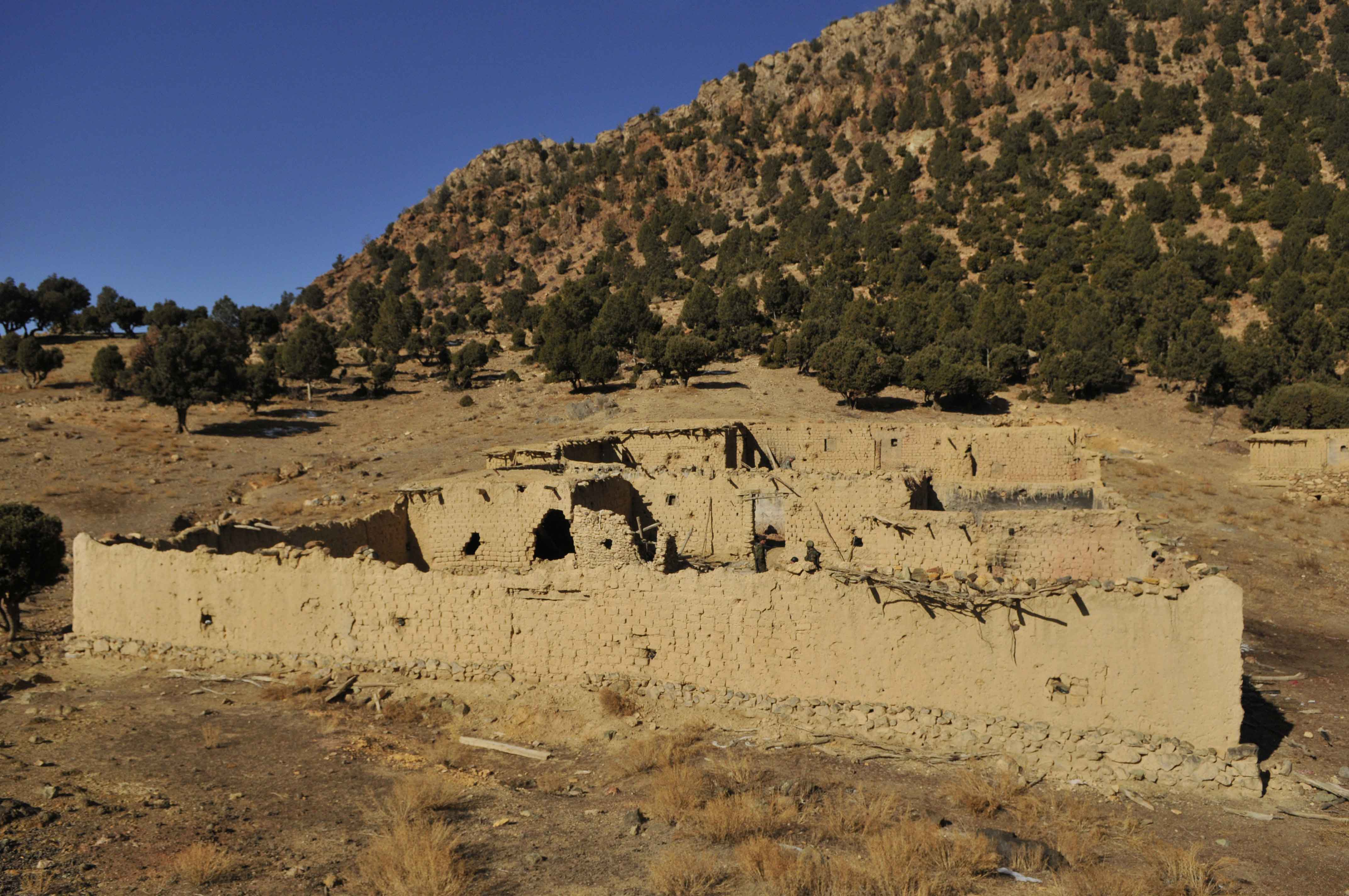
The ruins of a reported Taliban safe house in Khost destroyed by American and Afghan troops in December 2009.

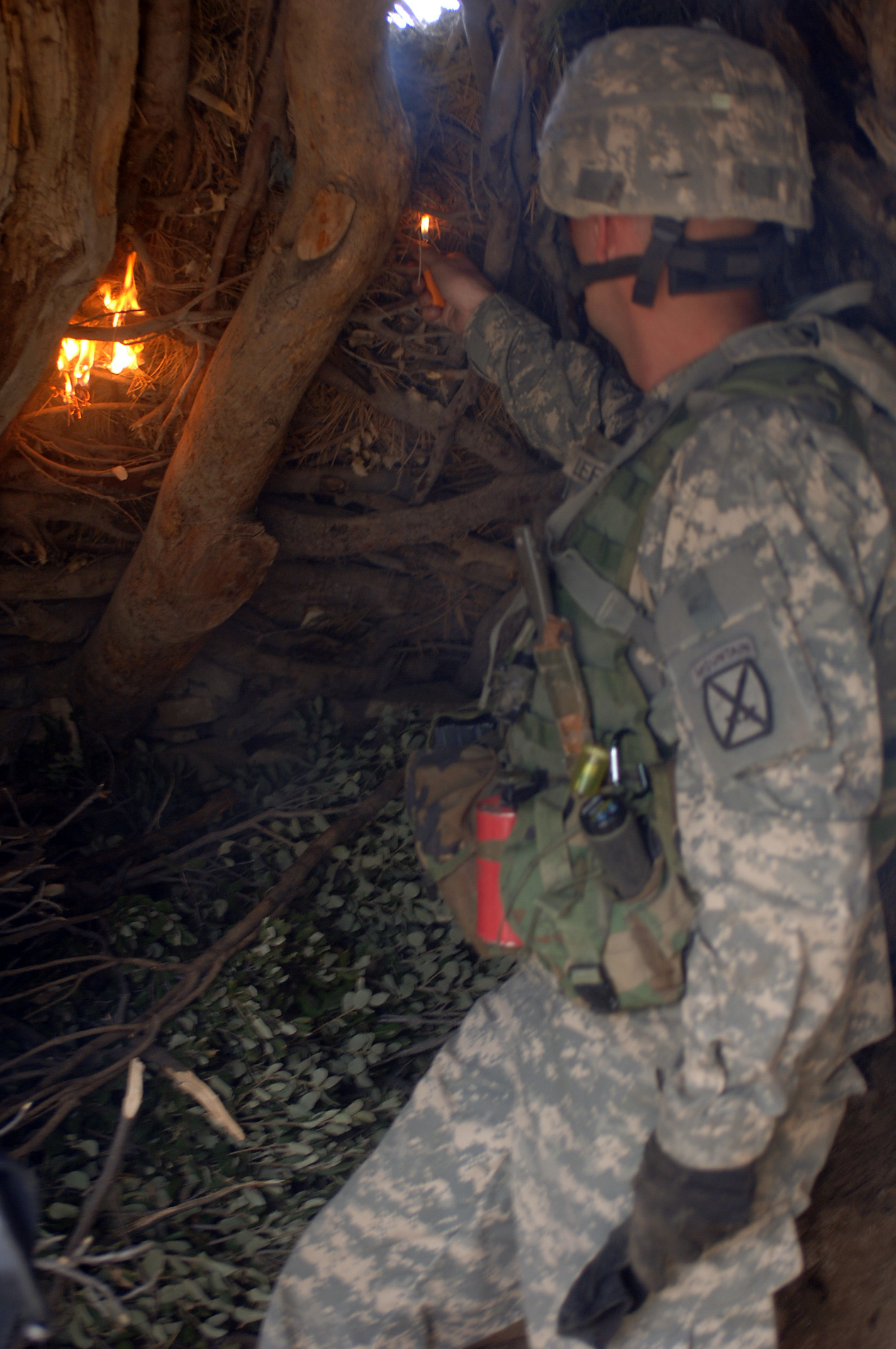
A Soldier from Charlie Company 2nd Battalion, 87th Infantry Regiment sets fire to a Taliban safehouse discovered during Operation Catamount Fury.

Al-Qaeda is understood to have operated a number of safe houses, some of which were used as training centres.

American intelligence analysts justified the extrajudicial detention of some Guantanamo suspects because they stayed in what they characterized as an Al Qaeda safe house, one of the most prominent being Issa safehouse in Faisalabad, Pakistan. American intelligence analysts also justify the detention of suspects who stayed in an Al Qaeda guest house, a Taliban safe house or a Taliban guest house.

In the first Seton Hall report, Mark Denbeaux writes that guest houses and/or safe houses are mentioned in the evidence against 27% of detainees. Denbeaux states that "In the region, the term guest house refers simply to a form of travel accommodation" and "Stopping at such facilities is common for all people traveling in the area." A response to that report written by West Point's Combating Terrorism Center argued that "the Seton Hall report inaccurately defines the term ‘safe-house’ – a well-known tool leveraged by criminals and terrorists to facilitate discreet movement of associates – as an innocuous residence used by American tourists and travel agencies." Denbeaux responded that the Seton Hall study had "used the Department of Defense's terms objectively and accepted their plain meanings" and that "West Point does not provide any basis for equating guest houses and safe houses other than the obvious problem with detaining an individual in part based on his stay in a 'guest' house."

The 2007 CTC report states that:

Safe-houses, sometimes referred to as 'guest-houses,' facilitate an individual's ability to discreetly (sic) transit from one location to another by providing them with a place to spend the night, acquire resources, obtain false documentation or secure modes of transportation. Organized crime syndicates, terrorist networks and traffickers all rely on safe-houses to move people from place-to-place. They may be houses, apartments, mosques, stores, refugee camps, barracks, or any other type of infrastructure that houses individuals involved in nefarious activities.

Al-Qa'ida, the Taliban and their associates have leveraged the safe-house network to great ends, particularly in Afghanistan and Pakistan. Many of these houses and apartments, which had been run for the specific purpose of ensuring safe passage for associates of those movements,gathering intelligence on targets and for going underground have been identified by the United States in its ongoing counterterrorism operations.

Benjamin Wittes and his colleagues at the Brookings Institution noted in January 2010 that different judges reviewing the habeas petitions for different Guantanamo captives had reached conflicting conclusions on the common issue of whether an alleged stay in a suspect guest house indicated terrorist affiliation strongly enough to justify continued detention. Wittes and his colleagues, in their analysis of the documents from the first 558 Combatant Status Review Tribunals, reported that continued detention was found justified for 130 Guantanamo captives at least in part because they "stayed in Al Qaeda, Taliban, or other guest- or safehouses."

Joseph Felter and his colleagues, in "An Assessment of 516 Combatant Status Review Tribunal (CSRT) Unclassified Summaries", found that 24 percent of the Summary of Evidence memos, or 122 of the 516 they analyzed, justified the continued detention of a captive due to claims of stays in a suspicious guest house or safe house.
