= Seton Hall reports =

Academic studies of US government policy

The Seton Hall reports, also known as the Denbeaux studies, are several studies published by the Center for Policy and Research at Seton Hall University Law School in the United States beginning in 2006, about the detainees and United States government policy related to operations at the Guantánamo Bay detention camp. At a time when the government revealed little about these operations, the reports were based on analysis of data maintained and released by the Department of Defense. The director of the Law School's Center, Mark P. Denbeaux, supervised law student teams in their analysis and writing the studies. The first study was Report on Guantanamo Detainees: A Profile of 517 Detainees through Analysis of Department of Defense Data (February 8, 2006).

By late 2009, Denbeaux had supervised fifteen studies on Guantanamo for the Center for Policy and Research. The studies have been cited in both houses of Congress, for instance, by the Senate Armed Services Committee, and by national and international press.

Denbeaux and his son, Joshua Denbeaux, were listed as the lead names on the first and several succeeding studies. They have a law firm together and are the legal representatives for the Guantanamo detainees Rafiq Bin Bashir Bin Jalud Al Hami and Mohammed Abdul Rahman, both from Tunisia.

== Studies ==
Report on Guantanamo Detainees: A Profile of 517 Detainees through Analysis of Department of Defense Data (February 8, 2006)	Based on the Summary of Evidence memos prepared for 517 Guantanamo captives' Combatant Status Review Tribunals, first published in the Winter and Spring of 2005.; Asserted that about 5% of the detainees had been captured by United States soldiers on a battlefield; 86% were captured by Afghan and Pakistanis or Pakistani border guards. They turned over prisoners to US forces, when the US was widely paying bounties of $5,000 per prisoner.
Inter- and Intra-Departmental Disagreements About Who Is Our Enemy (20 March 2006)	Based on the CSRT Summary of Evidence memos prepared for 517 Guantanamo captives, published in 2005.; Asserted that the continued detention of many captives was based only on allegations of associations with certain organizations, but these were not included among the USA's public lists of those suspected of ties to terrorism.; Concluded either that the public lists, such as the "no-fly lists", were permitting individuals to enter the USA who had other meaningful ties to terrorism, or that the organizations cited to justify detention at Guantanamo did not have significant ties to terrorism.
The Guantanamo Detainees During Detention: Data from Department of Defense Records (July 10, 2006)	Summarizes the Department of Defense reports of "hanging incidents" and "self-harm" incidents by detainees, and how many times captives were cited for infractions of the camp rules.
June 10th Suicides at Guantanamo (August 21, 2006)	Described discrepancies in the public record related to the first three suicides reported in Guantanamo.
No-Hearing Hearings (November 17, 2006)	Analyzed compliance of the Combatant Status Review Tribunals (CSRT) with their own rules and the rule of law.; Was the first study to document that new Tribunals were routinely convened to reverse the determinations of Tribunals that had ruled that captives had not been "enemy combatants" .; Described incidents when Tribunals broke their own rules.
The 14 Myths of Guantánamo: Senate Armed Services Committee Statement of Mark P. Denbeaux. Denbeaux testified before the Senate Armed Services Committee on April 26, 2007	Based on the studies done by the Center for Policy and Research, revealed 14 myths which the Bush administration had been saying about Guantanamo detainees and operations.
The Empty Battlefield and the Thirteenth Criterion (November 8, 2007)	Students at the West Point Military Academy published an analysis of the documents the Department of Defense published about the captives. The Seton Hall study is a commentary on the West Point report.
The Meaning of "Battlefield": An Analysis of the Government's Representations of 'Battlefield Capture' and 'Recidivism' of the Guantánamo Detainees (12/10/07), Professor Denbeaux's Testimony before the Senate Judiciary Committee on C-SPAN	
Captured on Tape: Interrogation and Videotaping of Detainees in Guantánamo (February 7, 2008)	Asserts that, contrary to statements by Bush administration spokesmen, the published record shows that all of the 24,000 interrogations conducted at Guantanamo were videotaped, and that analysts prepared extensive notes.
Justice Scalia, the Department of Defense, and The Perpetuation of an Urban Legend: The Truth about Recidivism of Released Guantánamo Detainees (June 16, 2008)	Examines the dissenting arguments of United States Supreme Court Justice Antonin Scalia in the ruling in Boumediene v. Bush (2008).; Argues that Scalia was repeating "urban legends" when he claimed that more than 30 former Guantanamo captives had "returned to the battlefield" following their release.
Profile of Released Guantánamo Detainees: The Government's Story Then and Now (August 4, 2008)	This report concludes that the release of captives has depended more on their nationality, than an assessment as to whether they represented a security risk.
Released Guantánamo Detainees and the Department of Defense: Propaganda by the Numbers? (January 15, 2009)	This report challenges the assertions of Department of Defense spokesmen that an increasing number of former Guantanamo captives have "returned to supporting terrorism".
Torture: Who Knew -- An Analysis of the FBI and Department of Defense Reactions to Harsh Interrogation Methods at Guantánamo (April 1, 2009)	Citing FBI accounts, this report concludes that the various generals assigned to investigate reports of torture at Guantanamo failed to read observations filed by FBI agents about interrogations.
Death in Camp Delta (November 2000)	This report analyzes the heavily redacted NCIS report published in August 2008 about the investigation of deaths of three detainees on June 10, 2006, which DOD had said were suicides.

== Detainees' profile ==
The Report on Guantanamo Detainees: A Profile of 517 Detainees through Analysis of Department of Defense Data February 8, 2006, also known as the Denbeaux study (2006), was the first study on Guantanamo prepared under the supervision of Professor Mark Denbeaux of Seton Hall University, the director of its Center for Policy and Research. Denbeaux and his son Joshua Denbeaux, an attorney for two Guantánamo detainees, oversaw a statistical analysis by law students of the unclassified information available from the Department of Defense about the Guantánamo Bay detainees. The study was published by Seton Hall University's Center for Policy and Research.

The students analyzed:

1. Where the documents said the detainees were captured.
2. Who the documents said captured the detainees.
3. The relationship the documents alleged existed between the detainee and al Qaeda.
4. The relationship the documents alleged existed between the detainee and the Taliban.

Nat Hentoff of the Village Voice opined:

Already, however, we now know much more about how "dangerous" they really are because of a stunning, heavily documented investigation by the Seton Hall (New Jersey) School of Law. Titled "Report on Guantánamo Detainees," it profiles 517 of the prisoners at Gitmo entirely based on "analysis of Department of Defense data.

An editorial by the BBC's John Simpson summarized the study:

- 92% of the Guantanamo detainees had not been al-Qaeda fighters.
- only 5% of the Guantanamo detainees were captured by American forces.
- 440 of 517 detainees (86%) appeared to have been captured by bounty hunters, in return for a $5,000 reward from the US for each prisoner.

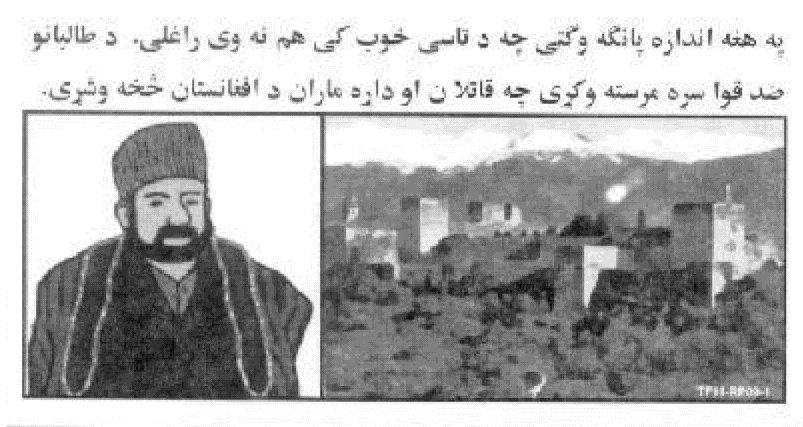
Flyer reads: "You can receive millions of dollars for helping the Anti-Taliban Force catch Al-Qaeda and Taliban murderers."

The study reveals that the 92% of the detainees who were not alleged to be al-Qaeda fighters were alleged to be either al-Qaeda or Taliban members, or members of affiliated hostile groups. Of these "other affiliated groups," a second Center report notes that some of the groups are not included in the government's published lists of terrorist organizations.

The cited primary sources in the study did not include data on actual bounties. One example of a bounty was given in the references: that of Salim Hamdan, who was known to have worked directly for Osama bin Laden. The reference comes from an article in the New York Times Magazine.

The study says:

In a handful of cases the detainee's possession of a Casio watch or the wearing olive-drab clothing is cited as evidence that the detainee is an enemy combatant. No basis is given to explain why such evidence makes the detainee an enemy combatant.

Several international news sources noticed this use of the possession of a model of watch as evidence against detainees at Guantanamo Bay with detainees "shocked" that wearing a cheap popular watch sold worldwide could be used against them when "millions and millions of people have these types of Casio watches". Abdulla Kamel al Kandari told his tribunal he had no idea that the watch was associated with terrorism, that the four Muslim chaplains at Guantanamo all wore this model of watch and described the features of his watch that signal the call to prayers to a devout Muslim. Salih Uyar told his tribunal: "If it's a crime to carry this watch? Your own military personnel also carry this watch, too. Does that mean that they're just terrorists as well?" Other detainees described how its compass was used to face Mecca, and being waterproof it endured ritual wash up before prayer.

The lead authors are the legal representatives of two Guantánamo Bay detainees: Rafiq Bin Bashir Bin Jalud Al Hami and Mohammed Abdul Rahman

Major Michael Shavers, a Pentagon spokesman, called the 2006 study about the detainees "flawed because its authors didn't have access to classified evidence."
