= Abdul Rahman Shalabi =

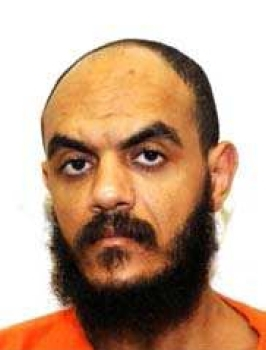
- Abdul Shalabi's official Guantanamo portrait, showing him wearing the orange uniform issued to "noncompliant" individuals
- Born: December 4, 1975 (age 50); Medina, Saudi Arabia
- Detained at: Guantanamo
- ISN: 42
- Charge(s): no charge, held in extrajudicial detention
- Status: Released

Abdul Rahman Shalabi (born December 4, 1975) is a citizen of Saudi Arabia who was held in extrajudicial detention in the United States Guantanamo Bay detention camps, in Cuba. His Guantanamo Internee Security Number is 42.

Shalabi arrived on January 11, 2002, the day the camp opened, and he was released on September 21, 2015. He is regularly described as an Osama bin Laden bodyguard and a member of al Qaeda—accusations he consistently disputed.

== Official status reviews ==
Originally the Bush Presidency asserted that captives apprehended in the "war on terror" were not covered by the Geneva Conventions, and could be held indefinitely, without charge, and without an open and transparent review of the justifications for their detention. In 2004, the United States Supreme Court ruled, in Rasul v. Bush, that Guantanamo captives were entitled to being informed of the allegations justifying their detention, and were entitled to try to refute them.

=== Office for the Administrative Review of Detained Enemy Combatants ===
Combatant Status Review Tribunals were held in a 3x5 meter trailer where the captive sat with his hands and feet shackled to a bolt in the floor.

Following the Supreme Court's ruling the Department of Defense set up the Office for the Administrative Review of Detained Enemy Combatants. Scholars at the Brookings Institution, led by Benjamin Wittes, listed the captives still held in Guantanamo in December 2008, according to whether their detention was justified by certain common allegations:

- Abdul Rahman Shalabi was listed as one of the captives who "The military alleges ... are members of Al Qaeda."
- Abdul Rahman Shalabi was listed as one of the captives who "The military alleges ... took military or terrorist training in Afghanistan."
- Abdul Rahman Shalabi was listed as one of the captives who "The military alleges ... fought for the Taliban."
- Abdul Rahman Shalabi was listed as one of the captives who "The military alleges ... were at Tora Bora."
- Abdul Rahman Shalabi was listed as one of the captives whose "names or aliases were found on material seized in raids on Al Qaeda safehouses and facilities."
- Abdul Rahman Shalabi was listed as one of the captives who "The military alleges ... served on Osama Bin Laden’s security detail."
- Abdul Rahman Shalabi was listed as one of the captives who was an "al Qaeda operative".
- Abdul Rahman Shalabi was listed as one of the "82 detainees made no statement to CSRT or ARB tribunals or made statements that do not bear materially on the military’s allegations against them."

=== Habeas corpus petition ===
A writ of habeas corpus, Abdul Rahman Shalabi v. George W. Bush, was submitted on Abdul Rahman Shalabi's behalf. In response, on May 19, 2005, the Department of Defense released eighteen pages of unclassified documents related to his Combatant Status Review Tribunal.

On November 5, 2004, Tribunal panel 19 convened, and confirmed his "enemy combatant" status, based on classified "evidence".

==== Detainee election form ====
The Detainee election form prepared by his Personal Representative record they met, for fifteen minutes, for a pre-Tribunal interview, at 8:15 am on November 4, 2004, the day before the Tribunal convened. It records:

Detainee will not participate. He affirmatively declined to participate and to have the PR represent him. He was silent throughout the reading of the script until he was asked if he wanted to participate. He then affirmatively declined, indicating that he did not trust the PR as he did not know him, did not trust the process as it is another game the US is playing.

==== Recorder exhibit list ====
The documents released in response to the habeas corpus petition contained a Recorder exhibit list.

Recorder Exhibit List For # 042
#	Title	Classification
RI	Unclassified Summary	UNCLASSIFIED
R2	FBI Certification Re: Redaction of National Security Information dtd dtd 27 OCT 04	UNCLASSIFIED
R3	FBI 302 did 16 MAR 02	FOUO//LES
R4	FBI 302 (000055DP) did 29 AUG 02	FOUO//LES
R5	FBI 302 (000252) did 17 MAY 03	FOUO//LES
R6	IIR 6 034 0743 03	SECRET//NOFORN
R7	CITF FM 40 (001452DP) dtd 14 JUN 04	SECRET//NOFORN
R8	CITF FM 40 (001457DP) dtd 15 JUN 04	SECRET//NOFORN
R9	Knowledgeability Brief dtd 01 FEB 02	SECRET
R10	CITF Recommendation Memo dtd 26 APR 04	SECRET//NOFORN
Rll	JTF GTMO Baseball Card	SECRET//NOFORN
R12	IIR 6 034 0993 03	SECRET//NOFORN

The Military Commissions Act of 2006 mandated that Guantanamo captives were no longer entitled to access the US civil justice system, so all outstanding habeas corpus petitions were stayed.

On June 12, 2008, the United States Supreme Court ruled, in Boumediene v. Bush, that the Military Commissions Act could not remove the right for Guantanamo captives to access the US Federal Court system. And all previous Guantanamo captives' habeas petitions were eligible to be re-instated.

On July 18, 2008, Julia Tarver Mason filed a motion to renew Abdul Rahman Shalabi's habeas corpus petition. The petition states that five other Saudi citizens who had been part of the original 2005 petition had been repatriated to Saudi Arabia. Their names were listed as: Saleh Al-Oshan, Zaben Al Shammari, Abdullah Al Otaibi, Fahd Nasser Mohamed and Musa Al Wahab.

The petition stated that the files the Department of Defense provided to his attorney's were incomplete:

The factual return provided in May 2005, however, is incomplete and missing important substantive information about Shalabi and the evidence against him. Nor has the factual return been supplemented to include the record of further proceedings such as Administrative Review Board records. The complete classified and unredacted factual returns and the classified records of the Administrative Review Board will be necessary in pursuing the case.

The petition states that Shalabi was the subject of a 30-day notice. The Department of Defense has transferred some captives who had habeas corpus petitions filed on their behalf to the custody of regimes where their lawyers felt their safety would be at risk. In response, attorneys filed motions that the Department of Defense should advise them of plans to transfer captives' custody.

=== Formerly secret Joint Task Force Guantanamo assessment ===
On April 25, 2011, whistleblower organization WikiLeaks published formerly secret assessments drafted by Joint Task Force Guantanamo analysts. A Joint Task Force Guantanamo detainee assessment was drafted on May 14, 2008. It was eleven pages long and was signed by camp commandant Rear Admiral David M. Thomas Jr. He recommended continued detention.

=== Guantanamo Joint Review Task Force ===
When he assumed office in January 2009, President Barack Obama made a number of promises about the future of Guantanamo. He promised the use of torture would cease at the camp. He promised to institute a new review system. That new review system was composed of officials from six departments, where the OARDEC reviews were conducted entirely by the Department of Defense. When it reported back, a year later, the Joint Review Task Force classified some individuals as too dangerous to be transferred from Guantanamo, even though there was no evidence to justify laying charges against them. On April 9, 2013, that document was made public after a Freedom of Information Act request. Abdul Rahman Shalabi was one of the 71 individuals deemed too innocent to charge, but too dangerous to release. Although Obama promised that those deemed too innocent to charge, but too dangerous to release would start to receive reviews from a Periodic Review Board, less than a quarter of men have received a review.

=== Periodic Review Board ===
Shalabi had a Periodic Review Board hearing convened for him on April 21, 2015.

On June 15, his Board drafted recommendation that he be released from Guantanamo. Carol Rosenberg, of the Miami Herald, was the first to report on this recommendation.

== Long term hunger striker ==
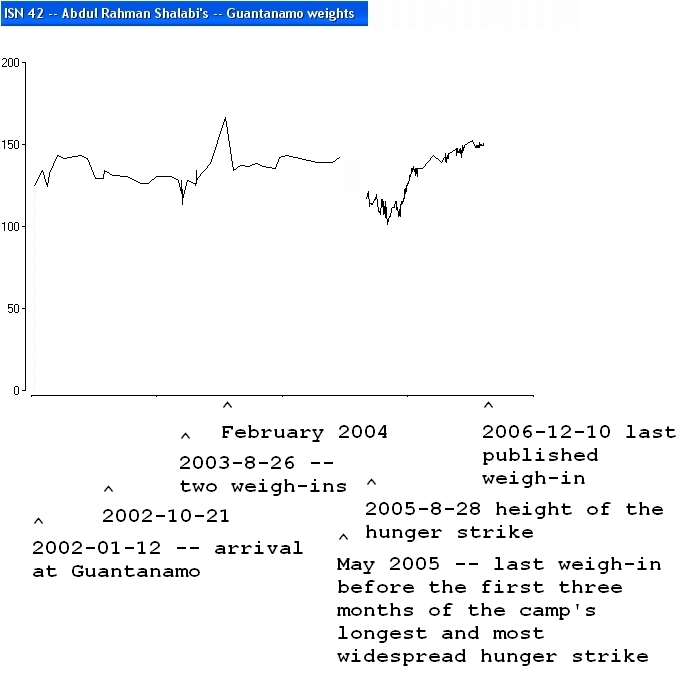
Abdul Rahman Shalabi weight was recorded at least 217 times between his arrival and December 2006.

In May 2008, the Gulf News reported that Abdul Rahman Shalabi and Ahmad Zaid Salem Zuhair were the two remaining captives who have been on the hunger strike that started in August 2005. No weights have been published for the first three months of the hunger strike—during which time he lost 26 pounds. From then on, his weight was recorded every three or four days. His height was recorded as 68 inches, putting the healthy range for his height at between 118 and 160 pounds.

On September 26, 2009, Shalabi drafted a letter describing medical problems being made worse through medical decisions being countermanded by a new "officer in charge". On November 3, 2009, the Associated Press reported that a recent affidavit from David Wright the chief doctor at Guantanamo, stated Shalabi's weight had dropped to 49 kilograms (108 lb). Julie Mason Tarver, one of his attorneys, claimed he was just a few pounds away from organ failure. Wright confirmed Shalabi's weight was recorded at 61 kilograms (134 lb) in May 2009. According to the Associated Press, 29 other captives were participating in the hunger strike in late October 2009. An affidavit from Sondra Crosby, a professor at Boston University's School of Medicine who examined Shalabi at the request of his attorneys, stated: "It is uncontested that Mr. Shalabi needs to be fed more calories, otherwise he will die." She said his weight loss could be due to other causes like hyperthyroidism, cancer or infection.

Shalabi's letter describes his force-feeding leaving him in great pain. He describes the most recent officer in charge countermanding the decision to provide screens for the lights that shine in his eyes, and leave him with excruciating headaches.

== Release from Guantanamo Bay ==
On April 21, 2015, Shalabi had a Periodic Review Board hearing convened for him. On June 15, his Board drafted recommendation that he be released from Guantanamo. Carol Rosenberg, of the Miami Herald, was the first to report on this recommendation.

On June 26, 2015, it was announced that the Periodic Review Board approved Abdul Rahman Shalabi for release from the detention center, and that he can return to Saudi Arabia.
