= Khalid Sulayman Jaydh Al Hubayshi =

Saudi Arabian former Guantanamo Bay detainee

- Born: 1975 (age 50–51); Jeddah, Saudi Arabia
- Detained at: Guantanamo
- Other name: Khalid Sulaymanjaydh Al Hubayshi
- ISN: 155
- Charge: No charge (held in extrajudicial detention)
- Status: Repatriated

Khalid Sulaymanjaydh Al Hubayshi (born 1975) is a citizen of Saudi Arabia who was held in extrajudicial detention in the United States Guantanamo Bay detention camps, in Cuba. Al Hubayshi, who acknowledged some jihadist activity, spent three years in Guantanamo, and further time in Saudi Arabia's al-Ha'ir Prison, prior to graduating from the Saudi jihadist rehabilitation program. Several western journalists have interviewed him, and accepted that he appeared to have successfully reintegrated into the mainstream of Saudi society.

== Background ==
His Guantanamo Internment Serial Number was 155. Joint Task Force Guantanamo counter-terrorism analysts estimate he was born in 1975, in Jeddah, Saudi Arabia. He was repatriated from Guantanamo, on July 19, 2006. He was repatriated with two other Saudis. Human Rights Watch reported that he was first held, without charge, in Riyadh's al-Ha'ir prison. He later went through the Saudi jihadist rehabilitation program, and, according to a profile in the Christian Science Monitor, his rehabilitation was a success. He admits that graphic propaganda videos that depicted Bosnian Muslim civilian casualties that he saw when he was a student had triggered his commitment to militant jihadism. He admits he traveled to Chechnya, to fight, and later traveled to Afghanistan. The Christian Science Monitor reported that "on his jihadi travels, he found himself trapped in a life he didn't deeply believe in. He felt he couldn't escape because of his past violations of Saudi law."

In an interview with the Washington Post, he expressed bitterness towards Osama bin Laden, who he felt had betrayed those who had been loyal to him, when he escaped to Pakistan. He condemned al Qaeda's attacks on civilians.

== Official status reviews ==
Originally, the Bush Presidency asserted that captives apprehended in the "war on terror" were not covered by the Geneva Conventions, and could be held indefinitely, without charge, and without an open and transparent review of the justifications for their detention. In 2004, the United States Supreme Court ruled, in Rasul v. Bush, that Guantanamo captives were entitled to being informed of the allegations justifying their detention, and were entitled to try to refute them.

=== Office for the Administrative Review of Detained Enemy Combatants ===
Following the Supreme Court's ruling the United States Department of Defense set up the Office for the Administrative Review of Detained Enemy Combatants. He had a Combatant Status Review Tribunal convened in 2004. Normally, he should have had an annual Administrative Review Boards hearing convened, to review his status, but his reviews did not take place.

=== Formerly secret Joint Task Force Guantanamo assessment ===
On April 25, 2011, whistleblower organization WikiLeaks published formerly secret assessments drafted by Joint Task Force Guantanamo analysts. His recommendation was three pages long and was drafted on January 31, 2004. It was signed by camp commandant Geoffrey D. Miller and recommended that he continued to be detained.

According to Andy Worthington, the author of The Guantanamo Files, his assessment says he acknowledges training at a camp in the Philippines, under Umar Al-Farouq in 1996. Worthington said his file says he and a twin brother traveled to Pakistan in 1997, at the direction of Umar al Faruq, where he contacted Abu Zubaydah, who agreed he could attend the Khaldan training camp—a rival camp to al Qaeda's camp. Worthington said his file says he was jailed for six months when he returned to Pakistan later in 2007, and that he had to use a false passport to travel to Yemen, where a relative of al Faruq smuggled him back into Saudi Arabia. Worthington said his file says for the rest of 1997 through July 2001 he worked for the Saudi electric power authority, returning to Afghanistan with plans to get further training and travel to Chechnya, and that he spent most of the next three months training at the Derunta training camp, in Nangarhar.

Worthington says his file says he was captured near the Pakistan border with four other Arabs on December 14, 2002. The file says US intelligence officials had suspicions about three of his brothers—based on what the file called "sensitive reporting". The file says his twin brother was suspected of involvement "... in a plot to attack US interests in Uzbekistan," The file says two of his elder brothers had traveled to the United States, where one of them had taken flight classes. Further, his file says he was suspected of being related to Khalid lbn Mohammed al-Jihani, who played a role in a suicide bomb plot in Riyadh in 2003.

== Repatriation ==
Khalid was repatriated on July 20, 2005, with two other Saudi captives. The two other men were Salih al-Awshan and Mishal Awad Sayaf Alhabri. According to a Human Rights Watch report, as of May 26, 2006, the three remained held, without charge, in Riyadh's al-Ha'ir prison.

Khalid was widely interviewed after being repatriated, and graduating from the Saudi rehabilitation program.

Al Hubayshi is offered as a success case of the rehabilitation program, who met the Minister of Interior Affairs three times. According to Al Hubayshi, the minister asked him, "Okay you made a mistake ... maybe following the wrong fatwa, being zealous. You are young, and you have been used. We will give you another chance. Are you going to take the chance or be stupid and miss that chance?"

On November 20, 2008, when Barack Obama was elected President of the United States, Al Hubayshi was quoted to offer an explanation as to why Ayman Al Zawahiri used racially loaded language to characterize the President-elect. According to the Christian Science Monitor, Zawahiri compared Obama to Malcolm X, and asserted that Obama, Colin Powell, and Condoleezza Rice were the kind of black Americans that Malcolm X would have called "house negroes". The Christian Science Monitor quoted Al Hubayshi explaining that Muslims had hopes that Obama's election would be good for the USA's relationship with the Muslim world, and that this forced Al Zawahiri to try to come up with a criticism.

=== Khalid Al Hubayshi's Washington Post profile ===
"I couldn't sleep at night knowing that women were being raped and children slaughtered, just because they were Muslim. I had to do something.

— Khalid Sulayman Jaydh Al Hubayshi

Khalid Al Hubayshi was the subject of an article in the Washington Post on March 24, 2008. In the article Al Hubayshi describes receiving training in Afghanistan, living within a broad jihadist community, within Afghanistan, helping to train fighters planning to travel to Chechnya, and an attempt by Osama bin Laden to recruit him to al-Qaeda. He described his long held reservations about al Qaeda. He described declining to be recruited into al Qaeda. He said that after the al-Qaeda attacks on the USA on September 11, 2001, and the subsequent American counter-strike on Afghanistan soon afterwards, Afghans blamed all Arabs for the counter-attacks. He ended up fleeing Jalalabad, and ending up digging in, in the Tora Bora region. He described Osama bin Laden's sudden retreat from Tora Bora as a cowardly betrayal. He asserted that the attacks on September 11, 2001, were a mistake because they had targeted civilians. Al Hubayshi is described as a former Guantanamo captive who has re-integrated into the mainstream of Saudi society.

== See also ==
- Care Rehabilitation Center
