= Sondra Crosby =

American academic

- Occupation: Professor of Medicine
- Known for: Expert on the after effects of torture, refugee health

Sondra Crosby is an American medical doctor and Professor of Medicine at Boston University, specializing in internal medicine. She is also a faculty member of the Health Law, Bioethics and Human Rights department at the Boston University School of Public Health. Crosby is notable for being one of the first doctors allowed to travel to Guantanamo to independently examine Guantanamo captives.

Crosby is notable for serving as the director of medical care at the Boston Center for Refugee Health and Human Rights. She examined over 300 torture victims at the Center.

Crosby is one of the authors of Broken Laws, Broken Lives: Medical Evidence of Torture by the US, published by Physicians for Human Rights. According to Physicians for Human Rights Crosby has "written over 200 affidavits documenting medical and psychological sequelae of torture."

In October 2009 Crosby submitted an affidavit following her examination of Guantanamo's longest term hunger striker, Abdul Rahman Shalabi. She stated that if he didn't receive more calories he would die. Crosby was one of the first doctors outside the DoD who was allowed to examine Guantanamo captives.

In October 2012 Crosby wrote a letter about Tariq al-Sawah's medical condition to camp authorities. Crosby had examined al-Sawah on two occasions and described him as morbidly obese, and laid out a treatment plan. His lawyer, Lieutenant Colonel Sean Gleason, said in March 2013 that camp authorities had declined to treat al-Sawah, and wouldn't even release his medical records.

In January 2018, Crosby traveled to the Ecuadorian embassy in London to examine Julian Assange. Assange's lawyers sent Crosby's medical assessment of Assange to Nils Melzer, the United Nations Special Rapporteur on Torture and Other Cruel, Inhuman or Degrading Treatment or Punishment, who was critical of the treatment of Assange by the media and governments of the UK, Sweden and the US.

== Honors and awards ==
- The Leonard Tow Humanism in Medicine Award, presented by the Arnold P. Gold Foundation, 2008.
