= No-Hearing Hearings =

No-Hearing Hearings (2006) is the title of a study published by Professor Mark P. Denbeaux of the Center for Policy and Research at Seton Hall University School of Law, his son Joshua Denbeaux, and prepared under his supervision by research fellows at the center. It was released on October 17, 2006. It is one of a series of studies on the Guantanamo Bay detention center, the detainees, and government operations that the Center for Policy and Research has prepared based on Department of Defense data.

The study analyzes the Combatant Status Review Tribunals (CSRTs) for 393 detainees held on Guantánamo Bay from 2004 to 2005. The study is notable as the first documentation that the OARDEC convened multiple Tribunals for some captives when their original Tribunals determined they should not have been classified as enemy combatants. It generally gained a finding of enemy combatant status on the second hearing, but some panels resisted.

The Denbeaux represent two detainees at Guantánamo Bay.

== The study ==
The report was based upon information given by lawyers for 102 Guantanamo detainees and transcripts of the tribunals, which were released by the government under a Freedom of Information Act lawsuit filed by the Associated Press. It analyzes the backgrounds of prisoners at Guantánamo Bay as represented in their files and how the CSRTs determined their status.

== Combatant Status Review Tribunals ==
This is the trailer where the Combatant Status Review Tribunals were held. The detainee's hands and feet are shackled to a bolt in the floor in front of the white plastic chair. Three chairs were reserved for members of the press, but only 37 of the 574 Tribunals were observed.

Following the United States Supreme Court's rulings in Rasul v. Bush (2004) and Hamdi v. Rumsfeld (2004), in which it held that foreign detainees and United States citizens had the right of habeas corpus to challenge their detention before an impartial tribunal, the Bush administration developed the process of Combatant Status Review Tribunals to serve as tribunals for the detainees. In addition, the process was to fulfill the obligation under Article 5 of the Third Geneva Convention, to determine if persons were prisoners of war or enemy combatants.

The Article says:

Should any doubt arise as to whether persons, having committed a belligerent act and having fallen into the hands of the enemy, belong to any of the categories enumerated in Article 4, such persons shall enjoy the protection of the present Convention until such time as their status has been determined by a competent tribunal.

These hearings were conducted based on the assertion by the Bush administration that detainees in the war in Afghanistan were not eligible for prisoner of war status according to the terms of Article 2 of the GCIII and therefore designated unlawful combatant. The Bush administration had contended that the Taliban was not a legal government of Afghanistan and al-Qaeda was a terrorist organization.

The Combatant Status Review Tribunals were held by the United States Department of Defense between July 8, 2004 through March 29, 2005, to provide an impartial tribunal for detainees to challenge their detention. It was developed as an alternative to detainees' taking habeas corpus petitions through the federal court system. The status of each detainee was reviewed to see if they qualified for detention as an enemy combatant.

In 2006, after the CSRTs were completed, the Center for Policy and Research at Seton Hall University School of Law published No-Hearing Hearings, its review of the process and outcome for detainees based on publicly available materials, some procured under the Associated Press Freedom of Information Act request. The Center study was based on DOD data, some of which was incomplete.

== Findings in the 2006 report ==
No-Hearing Hearings contained the following conclusions:

- The government did not produce any witnesses in any hearing.
- The military denied all detainee requests to inspect the classified evidence against them.
- The military refused all requests for defense witnesses who were not detained at Guantanamo.
- In 74 percent of the cases, the government denied requests to call even those witnesses who were detained at the prison.
- In 91 percent of the hearings, the detainees did not present any evidence.
- In three cases, the panel found that the detainee was "no longer an enemy combatant," but the military convened new, second tribunals that were told to reconsider the evidence and found each of the three to be enemy combatants.

According to the Associated Press, Mark Denbeaux said, "These were not hearings. These were shams;" he called the hearings a show trial.

== Comment ==
With the Military Commissions Act of 2006 in mind, Andrew Cohen, the legal commentator of the Washington Post, stated:

If the actual trials of the detainees are as empty and shallow and pre-ordained as were the Status Review Tribunals there is every reason to be mortified at the prospect -- made real by the legislation -- that the federal courts will be frozen out of vital oversight functions. If a regular trial court proceeding were this shoddy, this unwilling to perform a truth-seeking function, this unable to achieve a fair process, the judge presiding over it would be impeached.

Nat Hentoff opined in the Village Voice that the "conditions of confinement and a total lack of the due process that the Supreme Court ordered in 'Rasul v. Bush' and 'Hamdan v. Rumsfeld'" makes US government officials culpable for war crimes. His article continues:

Co-author Joshua Denbeaux tells me: 'The government's own documents proved that the government's claims that the prisoners were the 'worst of the worst' was a false and shameful public relations ploy ... We hope that our reports will convince Congress to amend the Military Commissions Act and restore federal jurisdiction.' If that happens, the prisoners could contest their conditions of confinement, their imprisonment, and their sentences.

== See also ==
- Giorgio Agamben, Italian philosopher, known for his work on Homo sacer and the modern state of emergency
- Black site, where "enemy combatants" are detained in a juridical "no man's land"
- Combatant Status Review Tribunal
- Command responsibility
- Criticism of the war on terror
- Ex parte Quirin
- Extraordinary rendition
- Francs-tireurs
- Irregular military
- Jus ad bellum
- Law of war
- Military Commissions Act of 2006
- Third Geneva Convention
- Unitary executive theory
- Unlawful combatant
- Patriot Act
- War on terrorism
