= Abdul Rahman al-Amri =

Saudi Taliban militant and Guantanamo Bay detainee

Abdul Rahman Ma'ath Thafir al Amri
- Born: April 17, 1973; Taif, Saudi Arabia
- Died: May 30, 2007 (aged 34); Guantanamo
- Detained at: Guantanamo
- Other names: Rahman Ma'adha Dhafir al Hilala al Umari Abdul Rahman Ma Ath Thafir (al Umari) al Amri Abd al Rahman Maadha Dhafir al Hilala al Umari
- ISN: 199
- Status: Died in custody

Abdul Rahman Ma'ath Thafir al Amri (Arabic: عبدالرحمن العمري) (April 17, 1973, in Taif, Saudi Arabia — May 30, 2007) was a citizen of Saudi Arabia, held in extrajudicial detention as an enemy combatant in the United States Guantanamo Bay detainment camps, in Cuba.

Press reports said that the DOD reported al-Amri had committed suicide on May 30, 2007. He had not been charged with any war crimes and had never met with an attorney.

== Early life and education ==
Abdul Rahman al-Amri was born on April 17, 1973, in Taif, Saudi Arabia. He did not get any more education than middle school. He went into the Saudi Arabian Army, where he served for nine years and four months. He had trained with American advisers and was taught to use antitank weapons, artillery and light weaponry.

He went to Afghanistan to fight with the Taliban.

== Surrender after Tora Bora ==
CSRT hearing records said that he surrendered to Pakistani police in December 2001 after fighting at Tora Bora. He had admitted to carrying an AK-47 assault rifle.

After being transferred to Guantanamo in early 2002, he was never charged with crimes and never met with an attorney. DOD said that he was not given permission to meet with an attorney as he was not a party to a habeas corpus petition.

== Hunger strikes ==
The Associated Press reported that at Guantanamo, Al Amri had participated in several hunger strikes. According to AP, Al Amri weighed 150 pounds when he was transferred to Guantanamo, and his weight dropped to 90 pounds during the 2005 hunger strike. They reported that another Guantanamo captive had said that al Amri had been participating in a hunger strike as recently as March 2007. He had been force-fed with a nasal tube.

== Death ==
The U.S. Southern Command asserted that a Saudi captive had committed suicide on May 30, 2007. Initially the DOD withheld his identity until the Saudi government was notified.

Early on May 31, 2007, Saudi authorities identified the dead man as Abdul Rahman Maadha al-Amry.

Al Amri's autopsy report stated that the "male civilian detainee" was "found hanging by his neck in his cell with a ligature made of braided strips of bed sheet. By report, similar fabric bound his hands loosely behind him."

The Associated Press reported at noon May 31, 2007, that DOD had identified Al-Amry as one of the "high-value detainees", held in Camp 5.

The Miami Herald, citing sources with inside knowledge of the case, reports that the dead man was Abdul Rahman Ma Ath Thafir Al Amri. Their report identified Al Amri as one of the Guantanamo captives who was never allowed to meet with an attorney. The report quotes Al Amri's Combatant Status Review Tribunal, where he noted that if he had truly been a jihadist dedicated to killing Americans, he could have done so when he was receiving military training in Saudi Arabia from American advisers. The article also quoted Al Amri's denial that he had been involved in making a video about the USS Cole bombing, as the government had alleged.

Other newspaper reports commented on the timing of the death, pointing out that it was almost a year after the deaths of three detainees on June 10, 2006, which DOD said were suicides. Both incidents followed a new commandant being assigned to JTF-GTMO, and both incidents occurred shortly before the convening of a military commission. But, two of the three men who died in June 2006 had already been cleared for release or transfer to Saudi Arabia, and one was happy to be going home. They would not have been reviewed by a military commission.

In 2017, FOIA documents on the investigation into the death of Al Amri revealed that he had been found hanging in his cell with his hands tied in a "snug" fashion behind his back. According to the clerk in charge of the computer logs that tracked detainee movements, Al Amri had been with an interrogator in the hour prior to his death. But other witnesses told NCIS the interrogation had been cancelled that morning, either by the interrogator, or by Al Amri himself. The Naval Criminal Investigative Service (NCIS) investigator that examined the death scene found it difficult to understand how this prisoner could have killed himself in the time allotted while he was under surveillance. NCIS concluded Al Amri had stood upon a folded bed mattress in order to reach the air vent to which he presumably attached the rope of his jerry-rigged noose (made from bed sheets). The air vent itself was over eight feet above the floor of the cell. Despite the fact that the detainee had not supposedly met with an attorney, documents from the NCIS investigation state there were materials of a confidential attorney-client nature in Al Amri's possession at the time of his death, and these were turned over to the Judge Advocate's Office at Guantanamo.

== Press reports ==
Department of Defense documents released in September 2007 revealed that al Amri had warned camp authorities in 2002 that conditions at the camp were driving captives to the brink of suicide.

== See also ==
- Guantanamo Bay detention camp suicide attempts
- Guantanamo Bay homicide accusations
