= Rafiq Bin Bashir Bin Jalud Al Hami =

Tunisian former Guantanamo Bay detainee

Rafiq Bin Bashir Bin Jalud al Hami
- Born: March 14, 1969 (age 57); Tunisia
- Detained at: Guantanamo
- ISN: 892
- Charge: No charge
- Status: Transferred to Slovakia

Rafiq Bin Bashir Bin Jalud al Hami (رافق بن بشر بن جالود الحامي) is a citizen of Tunisia, who was formerly held for over seven years without charge or trial in the United States's Guantanamo Bay detention camps, in Cuba. His Guantanamo Internment Serial Number was 892. The Department of Defense reports that he was born on 14 March 1969, in Tunisia.

A Tunisian-born German worker in the restaurant industry, he was captured by unknown Iranian authorities and handed over to the CIA after traveling to Pakistan in 1999 to study with the Jamaat al-Tablighi missionary group. He was held in a Black site as a ghost prisoner, before being transferred to Guantanamo.

According to a report on the CIA's use of torture prepared by the Senate Intelligence Committee, al Hami was one of the CIA's captives who interrogators tortured without first getting authorization.

== Background ==
A Tunisian Arab, he lived for several years in Europe, before traveling to Afghanistan. He acknowledged that he had lived and traveled in Europe using forged identity documents, and had, at times, supported himself by selling illegal drugs. Iran was once a tacit ally of the United States, transferring approximately a dozen suspects, including al Hami, to US custody. Iran captured him in January 2002.

When the Supreme Court ruled, in 2004, in Rasul v. Bush, that the Bush administration did, after all, have to provide captives an opportunity to learn why they were being held, two of the three unclassified allegations offered as justifications for his detention focused around his attendance at the Khalden training camp in December 2000. According to the allegations, Khalden was an al Qaeda training camp. Khalden however, predates al Qaeda by over a decade, and is reported to have remained independent until the Taliban shut it down to accommodate Osama bin Laden, who was jealous of camps that he regarded as his rivals.

Al Hami acknowledged, in his testimony before his Combatant Status Review Tribunal, that he had confessed to attending the Khalden camp in December 2000 — but claimed he only acknowledged attending this camp because he was being tortured.

Al Hami has a writ of habeas corpus and two protective orders filed on his behalf.

One protective order requires the government giving his lawyers thirty days notice of any plans to transfer him, because Kessler agreed he had a reasonable fear of torture, if he were to be repatriated to Tunisia. The other protective order requires the government to preserve any remaining evidence that he had been subjected to torture or abuse.

== Combatant Status Review ==
Initially the Bush administration asserted they could withhold the protections of the Geneva Conventions from captives in the "war on terror", while critics argued the Conventions obligated the United States to conduct competent tribunals to determine the status of prisoners. Subsequently, the US Department of Defense instituted Combatant Status Review Tribunals, to determine whether the captives met the new definition of an "enemy combatant". From July 2004 through March 2005, a CSRT was convened to make a determination whether each captive had been correctly classified as an "enemy combatant". These hearings would allow Guantanamo detainees to challenge their “enemy combatant” status and ultimately their detention.

On 3 March 2006, in response to a court order from Jed Rakoff, the Department of Defense published a three-page summarized transcript from his Combatant Status Review Tribunal. Al Hami chose to participate in his Combatant Status Review Tribunal. Most detainees' transcripts contain a reading of the allegations against them. Al Hami's transcript does not. Unlike most detainee's transcripts, al Hami's recorder only recorded summaries of his answers. The questions put to him were not recorded.

The transcript shows al Hami was captured while carrying a false Italian passport with a Pakistani visa and 200DM. He is suspected of having been a member of Lashkar-e-Tayyiba, attending Khalden in December 2000 for training on the AK-47 and SKS, as well as heavy artillery and anti-aircraft weapons, but currently denies it.

=== Administrative Review Board ===
Detainees whose Combatant Status Review Tribunal labeled them "enemy combatants" were scheduled for annual Administrative Review Board hearings. These hearings were designed to assess the threat a detainee might pose if released or transferred, and whether there were other factors that warranted his continued detention.

=== First annual Administrative Review Board hearing in 2005 ===
A Summary of Evidence memo was prepared for his first annual Administrative Review Board on 25 January 2005. The two page memo listed ten "primary factors favor[ing] continued detention" and six "primary factors favor[ing] release or transfer".

The following primary factors favor continued detention

a. Commitment
1. Detainee sees jihad as necessary only when non-Muslims attack Muslims, and/or for defending a Muslim country from assault on their religion.
2. The detainee continues to be noncompliant and routinely troublesome to JTF GTMO camp guards.
3. The detainee acquired and traveled on a false Italian passport with a Pakistani Visa, for the sum of 200 Deutschmarks.

b. Training
1. Detainee admitted he voluntarily attended the Khalden training camp in Afghanistan.
2. At the Khalden training camp, Detainee was trained on the Kalashnikov, heavy artillery and antiaircraft weapons.
3. When the detainee entered the Khalden Camp in December 2000, it was under the command of an Usama Bin Ladin Lieutenant.

c. Connections / Association
1. Detainee admits to being affiliated/friends with Izz Al Din, a known al Qaida member.
2. The detainee was recruited by Izz Al Din, who convinced him to travel to Pakistan and onward to Afghanistan to join the jihad.
3. Detainee traveled to Lahor Pakistan, around November 2001, where he joined Lashkar-Al-Tayibah (LT).
4. U.S. Department of Homeland Security designated LT as a "Foreign Terrorist Organization" for its association with al Qaida and Usama bin Ladin.

The following primary factors favor release or transfer

a. Detainee stated he did not fight or train on weapons in Afghanistan.

b. Detainee stated he is not a member of al Qaida or the Taliban.

c. Detainee has never thought about harming the United States or its citizens, and stated that he never would.

d. Detainee recanted attendance/training at Khalden camp. Detainee stated he was tortured and beaten daily, and that the translator told the Detainee that he would be killed if he did not confess to attendance at the camp. Detainee stated he confessed to stop the beating and save his life.

e. Detainee stated his hand is only 35% functional and that he could not have trained.

f. Detainee does not believe in a sixth pillar of Islam and does not believe that jihad is a Sixth Pillar of Islam.

==== Transcript ====
Al Hami chose to participate in his Administrative Review Board hearing.

=== Second annual Administrative Review Board hearing in 2006 ===
A Summary of Evidence memo was prepared for his second annual Administrative Review Board on 27 January 2006. The four page memo listed twenty-seven "primary factors favor[ing] continued detention" and eleven "primary factors favor[ing] release or transfer".

=== Third annual Administrative Review Board hearing in 2007 ===
A Summary of Evidence memo was prepared for his third annual Administrative Review Board on 12 February 2007. The four page memo listed twenty-seven "primary factors favor[ing] continued detention" and eleven "primary factors favor[ing] release or transfer".

== Medical records ==
On 16 March 2007, the Department of Defense published records of al Hami's weight.

== Habeas corpus petition ==
A habeas corpus petition, Alhami v. Bush, was filed on behalf of al Hami and at least one other captive, in early 2005, before US District Court Judge Gladys Kessler. In September 2007, the Department of Defense published the unclassified dossiers arising from the Combatant Status Review Tribunals of 179 captives. Al Hami's dossier was not published with the others.

On 10 June 2006, the Department of Defense reported that three captives died in custody. The Department indicated the three men committed suicide. Camp authorities called the deaths "an act of asymmetric warfare", and suspected plans had been coordinated by the captive's attorneys—so they seized all the captives' documents, including the captives' copies of their habeas documents. As the habeas documents were privileged lawyer-client communication the Department of Justice was compelled to file documents about the document seizures. Al Hami's privileged attorney-client communications were among those seized.

On 15 August 2006, the United States Department of Justice requested that al Hami's habeas petition be amalgamated with Al Halmandy v. Bush.

== Torture lawsuit ==
On 24 April 2009, al Hami's attorneys filed a lawsuit that claimed he had been subjected to torture in 2001, months before the Office of Legal Counsel authored legal opinions justifying the use of extended interrogation methods.
