= Sami Abdul Aziz Salim Allaithy =

Egyptian former Guantanamo Bay detainee (born 1956)

Sami Abdul Aziz Salim Allaithy Alkinani
- Born: October 28, 1956 (age 70); Shubrakass, Egypt
- Detained at: Guantanamo
- ISN: 287
- Charge: No charge (extrajudicial detention)
- Status: Determined not to have been an enemy combatant after all

Sami Abdul Aziz Salim Allaithy Alkinani (born October 28, 1956) is an Egyptian professor who was held in the Guantanamo Bay detention camps, in Cuba. His Guantanamo Internment Serial Number was 287. Analysts reported that he was born on October 28, 1956, in Shubrakass Egypt. He was repatriated to Egypt on September 30, 2005. He was later classified by the United States Department of Defense as a no longer enemy combatant.

== Background ==
Prior to the Invasion of Afghanistan, he was a professor teaching English and Arabic at Kabul University.

== Combatant Status Review ==
The Bush administration asserted that:

the protections of the Geneva Conventions did not extend to captured prisoners who are not members of the regular Afghan armed force nor meet the criteria for prisoner of war for voluntary forces.

Critics argued the Conventions obliged the U.S. to conduct competent tribunals to determine the status of prisoners. Subsequently, the U.S. Department of Defense instituted Combatant Status Review Tribunals (CSRTs), to determine whether detainees met the new definition of an "enemy combatant".

"Enemy combatant" was defined by the U.S. Department of Defense as:

an individual who was part of, or supporting, the Taliban, or al-Qaeda forces, or associated forces that are engaged in hostilities against the United States or its coalition partners. This includes any person who commits a belligerent act or has directly supported hostilities in aid of enemy armed forces.

The CSRTs are not bound by the rules of evidence that would normally apply in civilian court, and the government’s evidence is presumed to be “genuine and accurate.” From July 2004 through March 2005, CSRTs were convened to determine whether each prisoner had been correctly classified as an "enemy combatant".

He was among the 60% of prisoners who chose to participate in tribunal hearings. A Summary of Evidence memo was prepared for the tribunal of each detainee, listing the allegations that supported their detention as an "enemy combatant".

The memo accused him of the following:

- The detainee is a member of al Qaida:
1. The detainee lived for approximately one year in a Khost, Afghanistan guesthouse.
2. The detainee moved to Kabul to teach in a Taliban madrassas.
3. The detainee admits to fleeing Afghanistan to Pakistan, after being wounded by a bomb.
4. The detainee was fleeing Afghanistan with several other people who were all armed with automatic weapons.
5. The detainee was captured in Dec 2001, and when captured used an alias.

On March 3, 2006, in response to a court order from Jed Rakoff the Department of Defense published a seven-page summarized transcript from his Combatant Status Review Tribunal.

=== Tribunal Allegations ===
The allegations, as read aloud during his Tribunal, differed markedly from those recorded on his Summary of Evidence memo:

a The detainee is associated with Al Qaeda and is a Taliban fighter.

1. Detainee was recruited to fight in Kashmir and Chechnya by a Jihadist recruiter in Saudi Arabia.
2. Detainee joined the Taliban after receiving a Fatwa from Sheik Ha Al-Uqla at the Iman Muhammad Bin Saud College in Burayda, Saudi Arabia.
3. Detainee trained at Al Farouq training camp in Afghanistan during September 2001.
4. Detainee was trained on the Kalashnikov rifle, Pakistan machine gun, and a Russian pistol at the Al Farouq training camp.
5. One of detainee's known aliases was on a list of captured Al Qaeda member that was discovered on a computer hard drive associated with a senior Al Qaeda member.

b The detainee participated in military operations against the coalition.

1. Detainee was a fighter at Tora Bora.

== Habeas corpus petitions ==
At least three separate writs of habeas corpus were filed on his behalf. US District Court Judges Reggie Walton, Kennedy and Leon considered his detention as part of three separate habeas cases: Mohammon v. Bush, Sliti v. Bush and Aziz v. Bush. He was identified as "Alla Al Mossary", "Abdul Aziz Al Mossary" and "Abu Abdul Aziz". on three separate habeas petitions.

In September 2007, the United States Department of Defense published 179 dossiers in response to captives' habeas petitions however his was not published.

== Guantanamo medical records ==
On March 16, 2007, the Department of Defense published records of the captives' height and weights. Most captives' weights were recorded regularly. Sami al Laithy's weight was recorded just seven times—once in February 2002, then in March, April, May, June, September, October 2004, and finally in May 2005. Al Laithy's height was reported as 72 inches, putting the healthy range of weight for him between 136.4 and 183.6. His weight on arrival was 152 pounds. The five weights recorded in 2004 ranged from 137 to 140 pounds. His final weigh-in was 130 pounds.

The record states he refused to be weighed on the missing months in 2004 and 2005 with no explanation is provided as to why no weights were recorded for 2002 and 2003.

=== Allegations of abuse during captivity ===
During his stay at Camp Delta, Al Laithi was rendered a paraplegic.

- Shortly after his arrival to Guantanamo, during a beating administered in the prison hospital, a guard threw him on the floor, and stomped on his back. He cites constant pain ever since.
  - The beating crushed two of his vertebrae, confining him to a wheelchair. He says he believes that the prison authorities denied him medical care that would have prevented him from eventually becoming paralyzed.
- His lawyer, Clive Stafford Smith, requested for Al Laithi to receive medical care for his injuries, to release of his prison medical records, and for him to be released from solitary confinement. Al Lathi remained in solitary confinement, after he had been determined to have been an innocent bystander, unlike the detainees who had been determined to have been Chinese dissidents, who were housed in the more amenable Camp Iguana.

== Repatriation to Egypt ==
In early October, American authorities announced that they had repatriated an Egyptian national back to his home country. Press reports quoted American authorities as saying that the Egyptian had been determined to no longer pose a security threat through an "Administrative Review"—the follow-on to the Combatant Status Review Tribunal.

However, on October 5, 2005, a Washington Post article positively identified the Egyptian being repatriated as Al Laithi. The Post quoted Commander Flex Plexico, who said:

"Prior to returning this detainee to Egypt, the United States received appropriate assurances from the government of Egypt regarding this detainee's treatment upon his return to Egypt. This includes assurances that this individual will continue to be treated humanely, in accordance with Egyptian and international legal obligations, while he remains in Egypt," Plexico said.

According to the article Pentagon spokesmen claimed:

"This individual's current health problems resulted from an injury sustained before our involvement with him. According to the detainee's statements to us, his injury was sustained in an automobile accident, and the damage has progressed over time," Plexico said. "There are no indications that his condition was adversely affected by his detention."

In an interview by a reporter for Al Ahram in 2005, he said that before he was repatriated to Egypt he was sent, briefly, to an American hospital, for an assessment. He reports that the medical records he was given, upon his repatriation, say the loss of the use of his legs was progressive, not sudden. The records allege that it was the result of a traffic accident, prior to his detention. He continues to refute the claim and asserts that the loss was due to brutal treatment while in custody and that records are a forgery.

Due to his a long record of criticism of the Egyptian government and did not wish to return to Egypt.
