= List of FBI forms =

The United States Federal Bureau of Investigation has a number of bureaucratic forms that must be filled out in the commission of any activities by its agents. These are typically mandatory, and are often presented at legal hearings as evidence of context.

== FD-209 ==
An FD-209 form is used by FBI agents to record their contacts with unofficial criminal informants.

== FD-292 ==
An FD-292 form is used by FBI agents to notify the agency that they are getting married or divorced.

== FD-302 ==
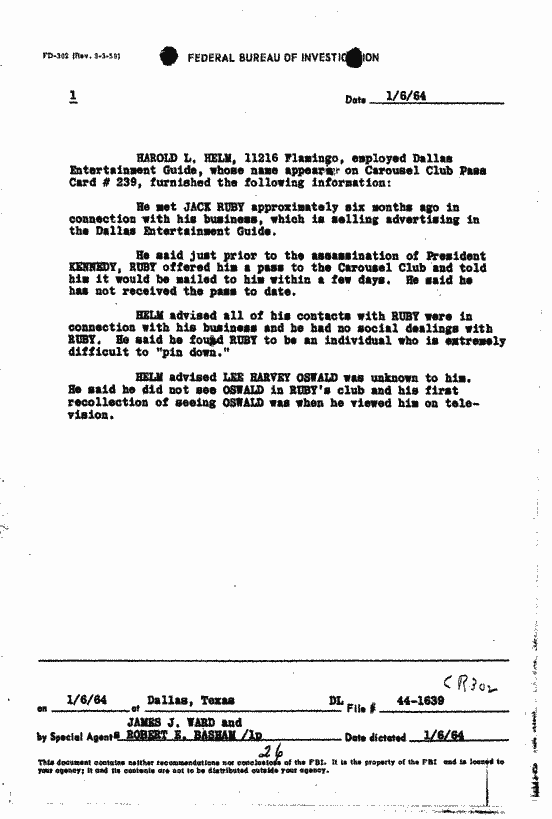
An FD-302 from the Warren Commission.

An FD-302 form is used by FBI agents to "report or summarize the interviews that they conduct" and contains information from the notes taken during the interview by the non-primary agent.

It consists of information taken from the subject, rather than details about the subject themselves.

A forms list from an internal FBI Website lists the FD-302 as Form for Reporting Information That May Become Testimony.

=== Criticism ===
The use of the FD-302 has been criticized as a form of institutionalized perjury due to FBI guidelines that prohibit recordings of interviews. Prominent defense lawyers and former FBI agents have stated that they believe that the method of interviewing by the FBI is designed to expose interviewees to potential perjury or false statement criminal charges when the interviewee is deposed in a grand jury and has to contradict the official record presented by the FBI. They have also stated that perjury by FBI agents allows the FBI to use the leverage of a potential criminal charge to turn an innocent witness into an informant.

== FD-395 ==
Standard "Advice of Rights" and waiver form.

== FD-472 ==
An FD-472 form is used by FBI agents to acquire consent to place a wiretap as part of an investigation.

== FD-473 ==
An FD-473 form is used by FBI agents to acquire consent for a co-operative subject to wear a covert listening device.

== FD-772 ==
An FD-772 form is used by FBI agents to account for the purposes and events of any trips they have taken outside the country, whether business or pleasure.

== FD-887 ==
An FD-887 form is used by FBI recruiters in the hiring process of a Computer Science Special Agent Request for Access to Sensitive Compartmented Information (SCI)

== FD-888 ==
An FD-888 form is used by FBI agents to prepare for a Federal arrest or a warrant .

== FD-920 ==
An FD-920 form is used by FBI agents to initiate an investigation of suspected drug crimes.

== FD-1023 ==
An FD-1023 (CHS Reporting Document) is the form FBI agents use to record raw, unverified reporting from confidential human sources.
