= Guantanamo Bay detention camp suicide attempts =

Self-injurious behavior of detainees

The United States Department of Defense (DoD) had stopped reporting Guantanamo suicide attempts in 2002. In mid-2002 the DoD changed the way they classified suicide attempts, and enumerated them under other acts of "self-injurious behavior".

On January 24, 2005 the U.S. military revealed that in 2003, there were 350 incidents of "self-harm". 120 of those incidents of self-harm were attempts by detainees to hang themselves. Twenty-three detainees participated in a mass-suicide attempt from August 18 to 26, 2003. A number of incidents happened after a change in command at the camp in 2003 resulted in an increase in the severity of interrogation techniques used by military and CIA intelligence officers.

On June 10, 2006, the DOD announced that three prisoners held by the United States at the Guantanamo Bay detainment camps had taken their own lives. The June 10, 2006 suicides were the first inmate deaths at the Guantanamo Bay detainment camp. The DoD acknowledged there had been a total of 41 suicide attempts among 29 detainees until that date. Since June 2006, DOD has announced three suicide deaths by detainees at Guantanamo. In 2008, the NCIS released a heavily redacted report of its investigation of the three suicides at Guantanamo in 2006.

In reports published in 2009 and 2010, Seton Hall University Law School's Center for Policy and Research and a joint investigation by Harper's Magazine and NBC News, respectively, strongly criticized the government's account of the 2006 suicides. Harper's 2010 article, based on accounts by four former Guantanamo guards, asserted that DOD had initiated a cover-up of deaths resulting from torture during interrogation. The DOD has denied these allegations.

== History: Conditions of detainees ==
In 2002 the United States government kept conditions at Guantanamo extremely secret, not releasing information about the detainees and especially not their names. That year, the United States Department of Defense (DoD) stopped reporting suicide attempts at the camps.

In mid-2002 the DOD changed the way they classified suicide attempts, referring to these acts as "self-injurious behavior", one of many terms the Bush administration coined to describe camp events. Medical experts outside the camp have argued that doctors did not have sufficient understanding of the detainees to make such conclusions about their intentions or motives.

In the spring of 2003, 32 Afghans and 3 Pakistanis were released from the detention camp. News media reported from interviews with them that some former detainees described despair and numerous attempts among prisoners to take their own lives, in large part because of individuals' belief in their innocence, the harshness of camp conditions, and especially the indefinite confinement and unending uncertainty they faced.

Quotes from ex-detainees:

"I was trying to kill myself", said Shah Muhammad, 20, a Pakistani who was captured in northern Afghanistan in November 2001, turned over to American soldiers and flown to Guantánamo in January 2002. "I tried four times, because I was disgusted with my life." "We needed more blankets, but they would not listen", he said. The U.S. government denied claims of prisoner abuse at the time, but on May 9, 2004, The Washington Post publicized classified documents that showed the Pentagon had approved interrogation techniques at Guantánamo including sleep deprivation, and exposure to extreme hot and cold, bright lights without relief, and loud music.

On January 24, 2005 the U.S. military revealed that in 2003, there were 350 incidents of "self-harm" among detainees at Guantanamo. 120 of those incidents were attempts by detainees to hang themselves. From August 18 to 26, 2003, twenty-three detainees participated in a mass-suicide attempt. Reporters noted that numerous attempted suicides occurred after a change in command at the camp resulted in an increase in the severity of interrogation techniques used against the detainees.

== Reported suicides on June 10, 2006 ==
On June 10, 2006 the DOD announced that three detainees had died at Guantanamo, saying they "killed themselves in an apparent suicide pact". The prisoners were the Saudi Arabians Mani al-Utaybi and Yasser al-Zahrani, and a Yemeni citizen, Ali Abdullah Ahmed.

The prison commander Rear Admiral Harry Harris, Jr. (2006–2007) stated: "This was not an act of desperation, but an act of asymmetric warfare committed against us." Harris also said that the Guantanamo detainees were: "dangerous, committed to killing Americans." He claimed that there was a myth among the detainees that if three detainees were known to have died in the camps, the DOD would be pressured to send the rest of the detainees home.

President George Bush expressed "serious concern." Colleen Graffy, the Deputy Assistant Secretary of State for Public Diplomacy, called the suicides, "a good PR move"—and, "a tactic to further the jihadi cause".

On June 12, 2006, Cully Stimson, the Deputy Assistant Secretary of Defense for Detainee Affairs, said:

I wouldn't characterize it as a good PR move. What I would say is that we are always concerned when someone takes his own life, because as Americans, we value life, even the lives of violent terrorists who are captured waging war against our country.

The Scotsman characterized this as an attempt by the Bush administration "... to pull back from the earlier comments about public relations and 'asymmetric warfare'."

Sean McCormack, spokesman for the United States State Department, said, "I would not say that it was a PR stunt". He said that the detainees were apparently unaware that one of them was due to be transferred to Saudi Arabia, under terms that would require him to be kept in custody, and another was to be released to Saudi Arabia.

Joshua Denbeaux, a lawyer representing detainees through the Center for Constitutional Rights, has said that prison authorities were withholding this information because US officials had not decided which country the detainee was going to be transferred to. Denbeaux is one of the principal authors of A Profile of 517 Detainees through Analysis of Department of Defense Data (2006), published by the Center for Policy and Analysis of Seton Hall University Law School. It analyzed DOD data about the prisoners' identities and allegations for why they were being detained.

Colonel Michael Bumgarner (April 2005 – June 2006), the commander of the camp's guard force, reacted to the suicides by telling his officers soon afterward: "The trust level is gone. They have shown time and time again that we can't trust them any farther than we can throw them. There is not a trustworthy son of a ... in the entire bunch."

== Skepticism about suicide claims ==
The Associated Press reported that news of the deaths raised skepticism over whether the Saudi men had committed suicide. The article reports Saudi government and family speculation that the men were driven to suicide by torture. Several prominent Saudis accused the camp authorities of murdering the three men.

It was reported:

Some people in the conservative Islamic kingdom questioned whether Muslim men would kill themselves since suicide is a grave sin in Islam. But defense lawyers and some former detainees said many prisoners at Guantanamo are wasting away in deep despair at their long captivity."

Kateb al Shimri, a Saudi lawyer representing the Saudi prisoners, said: "The families don't believe it, and of course I don't believe it either. A crime was committed here and the U.S. authorities are responsible."

Joshua Denbeaux of the Center for Constitutional Rights said that the suicides: "... represent the Pentagon's absolute worst nightmare." Denbeaux added: "... many of these prisoners have been trying to kill themselves, for months, if not years."

Senator Arlen Specter, chairman of the Senate Judiciary Committee, commented: "Where we have evidence, they ought to be tried, and if convicted, they ought to be sentenced." Specter added that many of the prisoners' captures were based on: "... the flimsiest sort of hearsay."

=== Government comments/investigation ===
Admiral Harris was quoted as saying: "I think it is less about the length of their detention ... It's less about that and it's more that they continue to fight their fight, I think the vast majority of detainees are resisting us."

On July 9, 2006 The Jurist reported that DOD spokesmen have claimed that the dead men received assistance from others. Further, the DOD claims that preparations for the hangings were written on the blank paper issued to the detainees' lawyers. As part of the investigation by the Naval Criminal Investigative Service (NCIS), the camp authorities seized almost all the documents from almost all the detainees, a total of half a ton of papers, including their privileged, confidential communications with their lawyers. The administration wants to suspend all lawyers' visits, while a commission reviews the papers for any sign that the detainees' lawyers helped plan the suicides. (Note: The NCIS heavily redacted report was released publicly in August 2008.)

Lawyers for Guantanamo detainees reported that the camp authorities were confiscating detainees' mail and legal papers. The lawyers report that at least one of their clients attributes the confiscation to DOD thinking they might suggest that the suicides were planned, and possibly encouraged, by detainees' lawyers. According to Clive Stafford Smith, legal director of Reprieve, a British organization representing numerous detainees: "They think that they are going to find letters from us suggesting suicide. It's ludicrous."

=== Comments by released detainees who knew the dead men ===
Bahraini detainee Abdulla Majid Al Naimi, who was released on November 8, 2005, said he knew the three dead men. Al Naimi said that Al-Utaybi and Ahmed were captured while studying in Pakistan. He said that they were interrogated for only a brief time after their arrival in Guantanamo. Their interrogators had told them they were not regarded as a threat, and that they could expect to be released.

The interrogations dealt with them only during the first month of their detention. For more than a year before I left Guantanamo in November 2005, they were left alone. But they were still held in bad conditions in the camp by the guards.

Al Naimi said that Al Zahrani was only 16 when he was captured. Al Naimi thought he should have been treated as a minor. "He was 21 when he died, barely the legal age in most countries, and was merely 16 when he was picked up four and half years ago. His age shows that he is not even supposed to be taken to a police office; he should have been turned over to the underage [juvenile] authorities."

== Allegations of homicide and cover-up ==
Guantanamo Bay murder accusations were made by United States sources in December 2009 and January 2010 regarding the deaths of three Guantanamo prisoners in June 2006 at the United States Guantanamo Bay detention camp for enemy combatants at its naval base in Cuba. Two of the men had been cleared by the military for release. The United States Department of Defense claimed their deaths at the time as suicides, although their families and the Saudi government argued against the findings. The DOD undertook an investigation by the Naval Criminal Investigative Service.

Following release of the redacted NCIS investigative report in 2008, Seton Hall University Law School's Center for Policy and Research published Death in Camp Delta (2009), a report criticizing the NCIS account for inconsistencies and weaknesses. The Center concluded that there was serious negligence at the camp, or there may have been cover-up of homicides resulting from torture. It noted that no military personnel had been prosecuted for any failings related to the deaths of the detainees.

In 2010, Harper's Weekly and NBC News released the report of a joint investigation, based on accounts by four former Military Intelligence staff, stationed at the time at Guantanamo. The article written by Scott Horton, a journalist and human rights attorney, suggested the military under the Bush administration had covered up deaths of the detainees that occurred under torture at a "black site" in the course of interrogations. In 2011, Horton's article on the Guantanamo events won the National Magazine Awards for Reporting. The award revived a round of criticism of the article's veracity.

== Attorneys' concerns ==
In 2006 and later, defense attorneys were concerned about their clients' mental health. Mark Denbeaux is a law professor at Seton Hall University and director of its Center for Policy and Research, which had published numerous reports on conditions at Guantanamo. He represents two Tunisian detainees and said in June 2006 that he was worried that other detainees were candidates for suicide.

In 2008 the Canadian Supreme Court ordered the release of a video of a February 2003 interrogation conducted by the Canadian Security Intelligence Service (CSIS) and a Central Intelligence Agency (CIA) officer of Omar Khadr, a Canadian citizen who was 15 years old when captured and one of the youngest detainees held at Guantánamo. In the video, the 16-year-old Khadr repeatedly cried, saying what sounds to be either "help me", "kill me," or calling for his mother, in Urdu (Pakistani). The government was reviewing CSIS actions in its interrogations of Canadian citizens at Guantanamo, including the minor Khadr, as more information had been revealed about abuse of detainees prior to interrogations. Khadr was finally scheduled to be tried at Guantanamo in 2010. He pleaded guilty in a plea bargain, served a year of his sentence there, and in 2012 was returned to Canada to serve the rest of his sentence.

== Fourth suicide, May 30, 2007 ==
The Southern Command announced on the evening of May 30, 2007 that a Saudi prisoner had died of suicide. They announced: "The detainee was found unresponsive and not breathing in his cell by guards." The DoD did not immediately release the dead man's identity. The DoD asserted that his body would be treated with cultural sensitivity.

On May 31, 2007 Saudi officials announced that the dead man was Abdul Rahman Maadha al-Amry. The Associated Press reported that same day that al-Amry had been identified as one of the "high-value detainees", held in Camp 5. Carol Rosenberg of the Miami Herald reported his name as Abdul Rahman Ma Ath Thafir Al Amri and that he was a military veteran of the Saudi army. He had never been allowed to meet with an attorney.

Other newspaper reports commented on the timing of the death, pointing out that it was almost a year after the three deaths of June 10, 2006, which DOD had reported as suicides. The press noted that these incidents in 2006 and 2007 had followed a new commander taking over JTF-GTMO. In addition, the deaths had occurred before the convening of a military commission to judge detainees' cases.

In 2017, FOIA documents on the investigation into the death of Al Amri revealed that he had been found hanging in his cell with his hands tied in a "snug" fashion behind his back. According to the clerk in charge of the computer logs that tracked detainee movements, Al Amri had been with an interrogator in the hour prior to his death. But other witnesses told NCIS the interrogation had been cancelled that morning, either by the interrogator, or by Al Amri himself. The Naval Criminal Investigative Service (NCIS) investigator that examined the death scene found it difficult to understand how this prisoner could have killed himself in the time allotted while he was under surveillance. NCIS concluded Al Amri had stood upon a folded bed mattress in order to reach the air vent to which he presumably attached the rope of his jerry-rigged noose (made from bed sheets). The air vent itself was over eight feet above the floor of the cell. Despite the fact that the detainee had not supposedly met with an attorney, documents from the NCIS investigation state there were materials of a confidential attorney-client nature in Al Amri's possession at the time of his death, and these were turned over to the Judge Advocate's Office at Guantanamo.

== Fifth suicide June 1, 2009 ==
Mohammad Ahmed Abdullah Saleh Al Hanashi, a 31-year-old prisoner from Yemen, died in the camps on June 1, 2009. On June 2, 2009 the DOD reported that he committed suicide. A number of journalists were at the camp to cover a military commission for Omar Khadr, a Canadian citizen who is the youngest detainee and the last western citizen to be held there. (Note: He was returned to Canada in 2012 after a plea bargain, to continue serving his sentence.) The camp authorities did not allow journalists to report news of Al Hanashi's death until after they had left Guantanamo.

According to documents released via Freedom of Information Act in 2016, Al Hanashi died by tearing off a piece of elastic underwear and strangling himself to death. Attempts by the Naval Criminal Investigative Service to understand the timeline of events leading up to the death were complicated by the fact that someone at Guantanamo told staff in the Behavioral Health Unit where Al Hanashi was found to turn off all computer logging of events that were then occurring. NCIS was never able to determine who had ordered the database logs shut down. Al Hanashi had made multiple suicide attempts in the month or so prior to his death, and even been put on suicide watch at least once. The description of his underwear type did not comport with other reported rules about the kinds of clothing allowed for Guantanamo inmates. At least one camp staff member interviewed by NCIS said they were surprised when they saw the deceased Al Hanashi wearing clothing that had not been approved. According to the FOIA documents, Al Hanashi was considered a leader among the other detainees, and the day he died had complained to the Chief of the Behavioral Health Unit about proposed changes in the rules governing punishment in that unit. He also complained about being tortured on the day he died, and wrote in a final note that he was very upset when his report was ignored, and said he didn't want to live anymore.

== Sixth suicide May 18, 2011 ==
DOD announced that Inayatullah, 37, an Afghan detainee held since 2007 on suspicion of being a member of al-Qaeda, was found dead on May 18, 2011, an apparent suicide. The press reported that his given name is Hajji Nassim, according to his attorney. He was referred to as Inayatullah only at the Guantanamo camp. He was arrested in Iran near the border with Afghanistan, and was classified by DOD as an "indefinite detainee."

== Reported suicide attempts ==
Juma Al Dossary	Made several suicide attempts.; Attempted suicide during a lawyer's visit in October 2005.; Repatriated to Saudi Arabia, where he went through the Saudi jihadist rehabilitation program.
Mishal Awad Sayaf Alhabiri	Suffered brain damage, allegedly following attempted suicide in 2003.; Repatriated to Saudi Arabian custody.
Sha Mohammed Alikhel	Sent to the punishment cells when all the ordinary cells were occupied.; Reports detention in the punishment cells drove him to despair, and he made four suicide attempts.; Released May 8, 2003.
Mass suicide bid	Late 2003 – 23 detainees tried to hang themselves simultaneously.
Muhammad Saad Iqbal	Muhammad Saad Iqbal told his CSRT that he had to wear the orange jumpsuit of the non-compliant captive because he attempted suicide on the 191st day of his detention.
Unidentified Saudi detainee	Joshe Natreen, an American defense lawyer, reported in July 2006 that a Guantanamo official told her that a third Saudi had attempted suicide since two Saudis died of suicide on June 10, 2006.
Unknown	On December 5, 2007, an unidentified detainee was treated at the prison hospital after trying to cut his throat.
Allal Ab Aljallil Abd Al Rahman Abd	Slit his wrist during an interview with David Remes, his lawyer, in mid-2009.; Previous suicide attempts had resulted in his being confined to the facility's psychiatric ward.

== See also ==
- Prisoner suicide
- Guantanamo Bay homicide accusations
- Ibn al-Shaykh al-Libi—a detainee who was tortured while in CIA custody, was reported to have committed suicide after being repatriated to Libyan custody.
