= Mishal Awad Sayaf Alhabiri =

Citizen of Saudi Arabia (born 1980)

Mishal Awad Sayaf Alhabiri مشعل عواد سياف الهابري
- Born: 1980 (age 45–46); Minawara, Saudi Arabia
- Detained at: Guantanamo
- Other names: Mishal al Harbi; Mishal Awad Sayaf al Habiri
- ISN: 207
- Charge: No charge
- Status: suffered brain damage in custody repatriated in 2005

Mishal Awad Sayaf Alhabiri (Arabic: مشعل عواد سياف الهابري) is a citizen of Saudi Arabia, who was held in extrajudicial detention in the United States Guantanamo Bay detention camps, in Cuba. His Guantanamo Internment Serial Number was 207. American intelligence analysts estimate he was born in 1980, in Minawara, Saudi Arabia.

== Brain damage ==
On March 3, 2006, the Department of Defense released 5,000 pages of documents about the detainees, in partial compliance with a court order from US District Court Judge Jed Rakoff.

Those documents revealed that Alhabiri suffered life-changing brain damage while in Guantanamo. Camp authorities attribute the brain damage to when he tried to hang himself in a suicide attempt on January 16, 2003:

significant brain injury due to oxygen loss... He will need to be in some assisted-living situation, though he can follow simple concrete directions,

Fellow captives, on the other hand, attribute the brain damage to a brutal beating by the camp's guards. They say guards were entering all the cells on Alhabiri's cell block when detainees were loudly objecting to an account of Qur'an abuse.

== Combatant Status Review ==
Initially the Bush administration asserted they could withhold the protections of the Geneva Conventions from captives in the war on terror, while critics argued the Conventions obliged the United States to conduct competent tribunals to determine the status of prisoners. Subsequently the Department of Defense instituted Combatant Status Review Tribunals, to determine whether the captives met the new definition of an "enemy combatant".

Detainees do not have the right to a lawyer before the CSRTs or to access the evidence against them. The CSRTs are not bound by the rules of evidence that would apply in court, and the government’s evidence is presumed to be “genuine and accurate.” However, unclassified summaries of relevant evidence may be provided to the detainee and each detainee has an opportunity to present “reasonably available” evidence and witnesses.

From July 2004 through March 2005, a CSRT was convened to make a determination whether each captive had been correctly classified as an "enemy combatant". Mishal Awad Sayaf Alhabiri was among the one-third of prisoners for whom there was no indication they chose to participate in their tribunals.

In the landmark case Boumediene v. Bush, the U.S. Supreme Court found that CSRTs are not an adequate substitute for the constitutional right to challenge one's detention in court, in part because they do not have the power to order detainees released. The Court also found that "there is considerable risk of error in the tribunal’s findings of fact."

A Summary of Evidence memo was prepared for the tribunal, listing the alleged facts that led to his detainment. His memo accused him of the following:

a. Detainee is associated with the Taliban.
1. The detainee admits he was on the front line in Afghanistan for three days.
2. Detainee received weapons training at the Malik Center in Kabul and Al-Farouq in Kandahar.
3. Detainee was captured near Mazar-e Sharif [sic] while fleeing to Pakistan with Taliban members.

b. Detainee engaged in hostilities against the US or its coalition partners.
1. Detainee drove a rocket launcher-mounted truck in combat against Northern Alliance forces.
2. Detainee was injured in hostilities against Northern Alliance forces.
3. Detainee admitted carrying a loaded Kalishnikov [sic] rifle while on the front line in Afghanistan.

His Personal Representative filed the following statement on his behalf.

- "Detainee admits to being on the front lines in Afghanistan for 3 days. Detainee received weapons training in the Malik Center in Kabul at Al Farouq in Kandahar. Detainee was captured near Mazar-e Sharif while fighting inside Jenki Castle against the Northern Alliance, but not the United States.
- "Detainee was not driving a rocket launcher mounted truck in combat against the Northern Alliance, he was driving a food supply vehicle.
- "He was injured and fainted while fighting inside Jenki Castle at Mazar-e Sharif. Had been carrying a Kalishnikov rifle but does know what happened to it.
- "Detainee is concerned about the status of his medical care if he is released.

=== Administrative Review Board ===
Detainees whose Combatant Status Review Tribunal classified them as "enemy combatants" were scheduled for annual Administrative Review Board hearings. These hearings were designed to assess the threat a detainee might pose if released or transferred, and whether there were other factors that warranted his continued detention.

A Summary of Evidence memo was prepared for Mishal Awad Sayaf Alhabiri's Administrative Review Board, on December 9, 2004. The memo listed factors for and against his continued detention.

The following primary factors favor continued detention

a. Alhabiri is associated with the Taliban.

1. Alhabiri admits he was on the front line in Afghanistan for three days.
2. Alhabiri received weapons training at the Malik Center in Kabul and Al Farouq in Kandahar.
3. Alhabiri was captured near Mazar-e Sharif while fleeing to Pakistan with Taliban members.

b. Alhabiri engaged in hostilities against the US or its coalition partners.

1. Alhabiri drove a rocket launcher - mounted truck in combat against Northern Alliance forces.
2. Alhabiri was injured in hostilities against Northern Alliance forces.
3. Alhabiri admitted carrying a loaded Kalashnikov rifle while on the front line in Afghanistan.

c. Alhabiri is committed to the Taliban and jihad.

1. Alhabiri did not say that he would pray for the Taliban to return to Afghanistan, only because it is their right to take care of their religion.
2. Alhabiri stated that he went to Afghanistan to die for the sake of Allah. Alhabiri admitted that he would fight against both the Jews and Christians to defend Islam.

d. Detainee's Conduct: Alhabiri's overall behavior has been non-compliant and aggressive. As of June 2004, he is still trying to commit self-harm. Alhabiri harasses, spits on and has hit members of the guard force. Alhabiri has refused meals and medications.

e. Based upon a review of recommendations from U.S. and Foreign agencies and classified and unclassified documents, Alhabiri is regarded as a continued threat to the United States and its allies.

The following primary factors favor release or transfer

a. Medical condition:

1. On 16 January 2003, Alhabiri attempted suicide by hanging, this resulted in significant brain injury due to lack of oxygen.
2. Alhabiri's likelihood for improvement of current impairments is low. He will need to be in some assisted living situation, though he can follow simple, concrete directions.

b. Alhabiri admits being on the front lines in Afghanistan for 3 days. He admits receiving weapons training at Al Farouq. Alhadiri admits fighting inside Jenki Castle against the Northern Alliance, but not against the United States. Alhabiri also states that he was driving a food supply vehicle, not a rocket launcher mounted truck in combat against the Northern Alliance.

=== Board recommendations ===
In September 2007, the Department of Defense released an index to 133 captives' Boards memos containing the recommendations as to whether the detainees should remain in custody. The DoD also released the memos for those 133 men. Mishal Awad Sayaf Alhabri was not on that list. His Board's recommendation memo was not released.

== Repatriation ==
Reuters cites a Human Rights Watch report that said Alhabri, and two other Saudis, were repatriated to Saudi custody on July 20, 2005. As of May 26, 2006, the three remain held, without charge, in Riyadh's al-Ha'ir prison.

As of July 26, 2007, Mishal al Harbi, who had received treatment at a hospital in Medina, had married a Saudi women and hoped to find a job that could make him self-reliant. Before he was allowed to marry, the Saudi Interior Ministry required that he complete a number of rehabilitation programs, required for all Guantanamo returnees.

== Washington Post interview ==
On March 1, 2007, the Washington Post published an article about Alhabri, and his family.

The article quotes Alhabri, his older brother, and released fellow captives who had been held in cells neighboring Alhabri's, who offered an alternative account of his injury — that he was injured while the camp's guards were entering the cells of captives who were yelling in outrage after witnessing the Qur'an being abused.

According to the article Alhabri has seizures, slurred speech, tremors and twitches, and memory lapses. He uses a wheelchair. The article's final paragraph quotes his older brother, and caregiver:

All the men who were released from Guantanamo, they are now leading a normal life, But Mishal can't walk, get himself a glass of water or go to the bathroom by himself. I just want him to go back the way he was before Guantanamo.

== See also ==
- Suicide
- Cerebral hypoxia
- Guantanamo Bay detention camp suicide attempts
