= Center for Policy and Research =

Research organization analyzing national policies and practices

The Center for Policy and Research at Seton Hall University School of Law is a research organization that analyzes national policies and practices. Law students, participating in the Center as Research Fellows, work to identify factual patterns and inconsistencies in areas that help shape the law and public policy.

Under the direction of Professor Mark Denbeaux, the Center's work focuses on three key areas: Interrogations & Intelligence, National Security, and Forensics. Among the Center's high-profile projects are the Guantánamo Reports.

The Reports have been developed by analyzing the government's own data through the systematic review of more than 100,000 pages of government documents procured through the Freedom of Information Act. The Guantánamo Reports, which totaled 15 by December 2009, have been widely cited, published, and reported throughout the world, including by both houses of the United States Congress.

== Reports ==
=== Guantánamo ===
The Center has released numerous reports analyzing aspects of the Guantánamo Bay detention camp and its operation, the characteristics of the detainees, and the camp's role in national security policy. The Center has issued reports regarding how the detainees were initially collected, weight data of the detainees, the recidivism rates of released prisoners, the incidents surrounding an alleged triple suicide at the camp in June 2006, detainee interrogation methods, and other issues. The various Guantánamo reports have been cited by various media outlets such as the New York Times, the Wall Street Journal, the Los Angeles Times, Salon.com, Slate.com, the Huffington Post, CBS, MSNBC, and Fox News.

The Center documented that an estimated 80% of detainees held at Guantanamo Bay detention camp had not been captured in military action, as claimed by the Bush administration, but had been transferred to US forces by Afghan and Pakistani forces to receive bounty payments. Many of the detainees had been missionaries or charitable workers.

In 2009, the Center issued a report, Death in Camp Delta, which analyzed the NCIS investigation report, published in 2008, of the deaths of three detainees in Guantánamo Bay on June 10, 2006, which were reported as suicides. According to the Center report, the June 2006 deaths raised serious questions about the security of the Camp, the duties of officials of the multiple defense and intelligence agencies that allowed three detainees to die, and the quality of the investigation into the cause of the deaths.

In 2011, the Center released The Guantanamo Diet: Actual Facts about Detainee Weight Changes. Using data of detainee weigh-ins released by the Department of Defense, the Center was able to discern that detainees’ weights varied so dramatically that many detainees have been obese briefly and under-nourished at other times. The same percentage of Guantánamo detainees have become underweight at some point as have become obese at some point.

=== Abu Ghraib ===
The Center is working to analyze the investigation of the Abu Ghraib prison scandal, which was widely revealed in May 2004.

=== Corporate ===
The Center's corporate team recently published a report examining the investigation of Lehman Brothers’ business practices undertaken by the U.S. Bankruptcy Court Examiner in the largest bankruptcy ever filed. The Center focused primarily on Lehman’s risk management and asset valuation—two aspects of company worth not readily available or discernible to the investing public. It notes that Lehman’s conscious violation of internal risk limitations as well as its conscious failure to accurately value assets was, alarmingly, found insufficient as a matter of law by the Examiner to trigger legal sanctions against Lehman Brothers or even a reprimand.

=== Forensics ===
What sort of evidence is most reliable for revealing the facts? What is the effect when certain evidence is allowed and other evidence dismissed? How does the collection of evidence affect the outcome? The Center for Policy and Research’s Crime Laboratory is answering those questions and more as it investigates and evaluates the methodologies of forensic science to determine their validity and appropriateness.

=== Drug-free zones ===
The Center performed a quantitative analysis of drug-free zone coverage throughout the state of New Jersey to determine whether or not they impose a disparate impact on minorities.

=== Breathalyzers ===
The Center published a report which exposed the unreviewable nature of New Jersey’s breathalyzers and the evidentiary impact in the courts of that "unreviewability." The report points out that the contract governing the use of the breathalyzer, the Alcotest, forbids the State from providing its breathalyzers for independent scientific testing. In addition, the manufacturer of the Alcotest prohibits any entity other than the State to purchase the Alcotest, even for independent scientific testing. The report argues that the combination of prohibitions immunizes the Alcotest from challenge, and effectively prevents scientists and defense counsel from determining its reliability.

== Publications ==
- "The Guantanamo Diet: Actual Facts About Detainee Weight Changes", 2011-26-05
- "Rumsfeld Knew", 2011-03-03
- "Drug Abuse: An Exploration of the Government's Use of Mefloquine at Guantanamo", 2011-02-12
- "DoD Contradicts DoD: An Analysis of the Response to Death in Camp Delta, 2010-04-10
- Death in Camp Delta, December 7, 2009 (with Brian Beroth, Scott Buerkle, Sean Camoni, Meghan Chrisner, Adam Deutsch, Jesse Dresser, Doug Eadie, Michelle Fish, Marissa Litwin, Michael McDonough, Michael J. Patterson, Shannon Sterritt, Kelli Stout, and Paul Taylor)
- "Revisionist Recidivism: An Analysis of the Governments Representations of Alleged "Recidivism" of the Guantánamo Detainees ", 2009-06-05
- "Torture: Who knew: An Analysis of the FBI and Department of Defense Reactions to Harsh Interrogation Methods at Guantanamo", 2009-04-01
- Released Guantánamo Detainees and the Department of Defense: Propaganda By the Numbers?", 2009-01-15
- "Profile of Released Guantánamo: The Government's Story Then and Now", August 4, 2008 (with Joshua Denbeaux, Adam Deutsch, James Hlavenka, Gabrielle Hughes, Brianna Kostecka, Michael Patterson, Paul Taylor, and Anthony Torntore).
- "Justice Scalia, the Department of Defense, and The Perpetuation of an Urban Legend: The Truth about Recidivism of Released Guantánamo Detainees", June 16, 2008 (with Joshua Denbeaux, Daniel Lorenzo, Mark Muoio, Grace Brown, Jennifer Ellick, Jillian Camarote, Douglas Eadie, and Paul Taylor).
- "Captured on Tape: Interrogation and Videotaping of Detainees in Guantánamo", February 7, 2008 (with Joshua Denbeaux, Jennifer Ellick, Michael Ricciardelli, Matthew Darby).
- "The Meaning of "Battlefield": An Analysis of the Government’s Representations of ‘Battlefield Capture’ and ‘Recidivism’ of the Guantánamo Detainees", December 10, 2007 (with Joshua Denbeaux, Grace Brown, Jillian Camarote, Douglas Eadie, Jennifer Ellick, Daniel Lorenzo, Mark Muoio, Courtney Ray, and Nebroisa Zlatanovic).
- "No Hearing-Hearings", November 17, 2006 (with Joshua Denbeaux, David Gratz, John Gregorek, Matthew Darby, Shana Edwards, Shane Hartman, Daniel Mann, Megan Sassaman and Helen Skinner).
- "June 10 Suicides at Guantanamo", August 21, 2006 (with Joshua Denbeaux, David Gratz, John Gregorek, Matthew Darby, Shana Edwards, Shane Hartman, Daniel Mann, Megan Sassaman, and Helen Skinner).
- "The Guantanamo Detainees During Detention", July 10, 2006 (with Joshua Denbeaux, David Gratz, John Gregorek, Matthew Darby, Shana Edwards, Shane Hartman, Daniel Mann, Megan Sassaman, and Helen Skinner).
- "Second Report on the Guantanamo Detainees: Inter and Intra Departmental Disagreements About Who Is Our Enemy", March 20, 2006 (with Joshua Denbeaux, David Gratz, John Gregorek, Matthew Darby, Shana Edwards, Shane Hartman, Daniel Mann, and Helen Skinner).
- "Report on Guantanamo Detainees, A Profile of 517 Detainees through Analysis of Department of Defense Data", February 8, 2006 (with Joshua Denbeaux, David Gratz, John Gregorek, Matthew Darby, Shana Edwards, Shane Hartman, Daniel Mann, and Helen Skinner).

=== Articles Published by the Center for Policy and Research ===
- "Profile of Released Guantánamo: The Government's Story Then and Now", August 4, 2008 (with Joshua Denbeaux, Adam Deutsch, James Hlavenka, Gabrielle Hughes, Brianna Kostecka, Michael Patterson, Paul Taylor, and Anthony Torntore).
- "Justice Scalia, the Department of Defense, and The Perpetuation of an Urban Legend: The Truth about Recidivism of Released Guantánamo Detainees", June 16, 2008 (with Joshua Denbeaux, Daniel Lorenzo, Mark Muoio, Grace Brown, Jennifer Ellick, Jillian Camarote, Douglas Eadie, and Paul Taylor).
- "Captured on Tape: Interrogation and Videotaping of Detainees in Guantánamo", February 7, 2008 (with Joshua Denbeaux, Jennifer Ellick, Michael Ricciardelli, Matthew Darby).
- "The Meaning of "Battlefield": An Analysis of the Government’s Representations of ‘Battlefield Capture’ and ‘Recidivism’ of the Guantánamo Detainees", December 10, 2007 (with Joshua Denbeaux, Grace Brown, Jillian Camarote, Douglas Eadie, Jennifer Ellick, Daniel Lorenzo, Mark Muoio, Courtney Ray, and Nebroisa Zlatanovic).
- "No Hearing-Hearings", November 17, 2006 (with Joshua Denbeaux, David Gratz, John Gregorek, Matthew Darby, Shana Edwards, Shane Hartman, Daniel Mann, Megan Sassaman and Helen Skinner).
- "June 10th Suicides at Guantánamo", August 21, 2006 (with Joshua Denbeaux, David Gratz, John Gregorek, Matthew Darby, Shana Edwards, Shane Hartman, Daniel Mann, Megan Sassaman and Helen Skinner).
- "Report on Guantanamo Detainees, A Profile of 517 Detainees through Analysis of Department of Defense Data", February 8, 2006 (with Joshua Denbeaux, David Gratz, John Gregorek, Matthew Darby, Shana Edwards, Shane Hartman, Daniel Mann, and Helen Skinner).
- "Second Report on the Guantanamo Detainees: Inter and Intra Departmental Disagreements About Who Is Our Enemy", March 20, 2006 (with Joshua Denbeaux, David Gratz, John Gregorek, Matthew Darby, Shana Edwards, Shane Hartman, Daniel Mann, and Helen Skinner).
- "The Guantanamo Detainees During Detention", July 10, 2006 (with Joshua Denbeaux, David Gratz, John Gregorek, Matthew Darby, Shana Edwards, Shane Hartman, Daniel Mann, Megan Sassaman, and Helen Skinner).
- "June 10th Suicides at Guantanamo", August 21, 2006 (with Joshua Denbeaux, David Gratz, John Gregorek, Matthew Darby, Shana Edwards, Shane Hartman, Daniel Mann, Megan Sassaman, and Helen Skinner).
- "No-hearing hearings", November 17, 2006 (with Joshua Denbeaux, David Gratz, John Gregorek, Matthew Darby, Shana Edwards, Shane Hartman, Daniel Mann, Megan Sassaman, and Helen Skinner).
