= Mark Denbeaux =

American attorney, professor, and author

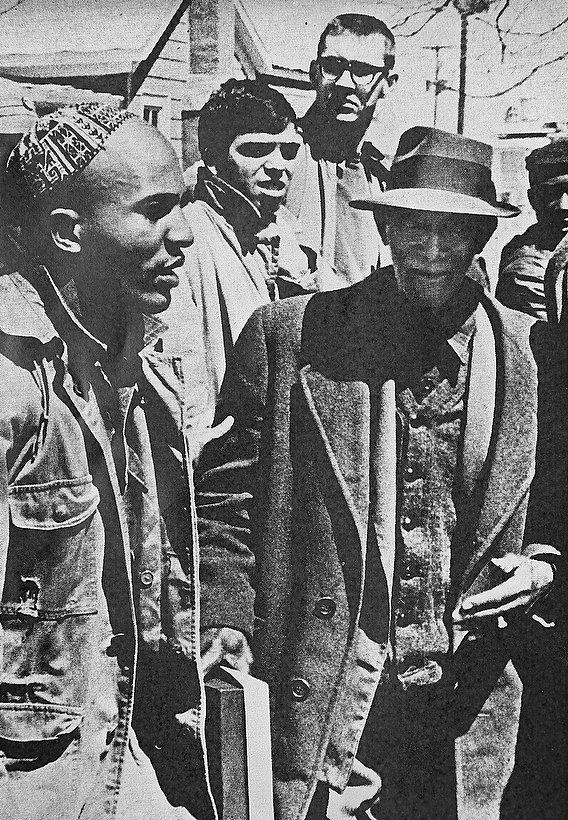
- Mark Denbeaux at the Selma to Montgomery marches, 1965
- Born: July 30, 1943 (age 83); Gainesville, Florida, U.S.
- Education: College of Wooster (BA); New York University (JD)

Mark P. Denbeaux (born July 30, 1943, in Gainesville, Florida) is an American attorney, professor, and author. He is a law professor at Seton Hall University School of Law in Newark, New Jersey and the Director of its Center for Policy and Research.

He is best known for his reports on the Guantanamo Bay detention camp and its operations. Denbeaux has testified to Congress about the findings of the center's reports. He and his son, Joshua Denbeaux, are the legal representatives of two Tunisian detainees at Guantanamo. He is also the lead Civilian Military Commission Counsel for two detainees who were tortured by the Central Intelligence Agency in black sites prior to their detainment. Denbeaux is an expert in forensics and has testified as an expert witness in cases across the country.

Denbeaux also is a practicing attorney in the family law firm of Denbeaux & Denbeaux in Westwood, New Jersey.

== Early life and education ==
Mark Denbeaux was born on July 30, 1943, in Gainesville, Florida. He attended local schools before going to the Commonwealth School.

Denbeaux received his B.A. from College of Wooster in 1965. An active supporter of civil rights in the 1960s, Denbeaux participated in the March on Washington on August 28, 1963. Denbeaux later founded an NAACP chapter in Wooster. The Wooster NAACP eventually became the Wooster Orville NAACP because it was too large to be run by students. He was later honored and asked to speak at the 50th anniversary Freedom Dinner in 2015. He participated in the Selma to Montgomery marches for voting rights in 1965.

He attended New York University School of Law, where he received his J.D. in 1968.

== Career ==
=== Early career ===
After graduating from NYU Law School in 1968, Denbeaux became a founding member of the South Bronx Legal Services. He served as the citywide coordinator for the Community Action for Legal Services, New York's organization of antipoverty lawyers, from 1970 to 1972. During this time he also filed complaints against judges for hostility towards poor people.

During the 1970s and early 1980s, Denbeaux represented Black Panther Party in The Bronx and Manhattan with Jeffrey Brand, now the Dean of the University of San Francisco School of Law. He represented the Young Lords in the Bronx during their takeover of Lincoln Hospital.

In the early 1970s, Denbeaux represented a number of U.S. soldiers charged with disobeying orders during the Vietnam War and the anti-war movement. He defended some in courts martial.

=== Seton Hall University School of Law ===
In 1972, Denbeaux joined the Seton Hall Law School Faculty. He has taught courses including Evidence, Remedies, Uniform Commercial Code, Contracts, Professional Responsibility, Federal Civil Procedure, Torts, and Constitutional Law. He has been an elected member of the American Law Institute since 1980.

In 2006, Denbeaux founded the Center for Policy and Research at Seton Hall University Law School. This work was originally inspired by Denbeaux's pro bono representation of two Guantanamo detainees. He and his son are among more than 100 attorneys who have represented detainees there.

The Center produces analytic reports in three key areas: interrogations and intelligence, national security, and forensics. Under Denbeaux's supervision, students working as research fellows in teams develop skills in pattern recognition, factual evaluation, and data analysis; Seton Hall University has published their original reports on issues concerning law and public policy.

Denbeaux is well known for the center's Guantanamo Reports, studies of United States operations and policies at the Guantanamo Bay detention camp; by late 2009, fifteen studies had been published in this series.

The law research fellows have systematically analyzed data published by the Department of Defense; they have reviewed more than 100,000 pages of government documents procured through the Freedom of Information Act. The first report was a statistical analysis of characteristics of the 517 detainees held in 2005. The Guantanamo Reports have been widely cited and published globally.

=== Guantanamo Bay ===
In 2005, Denbeaux began representing two Tunisian detainees, Rafiq Bin Bashir Bin Jalud Al Hami and Lufti Bin Ali. In 2009, al Hami was released to Slovakia. In 2011, bin Ali was released to Kazakhstan. In 2009, he began his pro bono representation of two more detainees, Abu Zubaydah and Mohamad Farik Amin. Denbeaux represented them in their habeas corpus petitions and remains the lead civilian defense counsel for both detainees. He has testified before the Senate Armed Services Committee and the Senate Judiciary Committee, as well as a variety of House and Senate subcommittees, regarding Guantanamo Bay and national security issues.

=== Forensics ===
Denbeaux is an expert in forensic testimony. He teaches an upper-level seminar at Seton Hall Law on forensic evidence. The course evaluates the reliability of experts who testify as to handwriting identification, fingerprint identification, ballistics, tool marks, blood spatter, bite marks, and other crime scene forensic evidence and witnesses. The analysis of these areas includes an evaluation of the reliability and validity of each area's conclusions, the value of each area's proficiency testing, and the methodology upon which the conclusions are reached.

In order to fully evaluate forensic evidence, the center has established a crime laboratory, certified by the requisite proficiency tests. Its representatives have given expert opinions about the methodology used by specific forensic fields in court. Its written reports have been used in court proceedings. A significant part of the seminar includes participating in these projects.

Denbeaux has spoken on the subject of forensic science at dozens of academic gatherings and has testified as an expert witness on the limitations of forensic evidence more than fifty times in state and federal courts as well as in administrative proceedings. His testimony has been cited in published cases in addition to the Third and Eleventh Circuits (U.S. v. Yagman and U.S. v. Pettus).

U.S. v. Yagman

Denbeaux offered testimony questioning the reliability of handwriting analysis in this 2007 trial. His testimony was limited to his observations about the limitations and/or flaws in handwriting analysis generally, not as specifically applicable to the facts in Yagman.

U.S. v. Hines

Denbeaux served as an expert witness in U.S. v. Hines, in which the government's motion to exclude Denbeaux's testimony was deemed moot. The government argued that Denbeaux's testimony did not meet the standards of Daubert and Kumho, while Denbeaux concluded that there is no need for expert testimony on handwriting analysis as it has never been proven reliable.

U.S. v. Ruth

In U.S. v. Ruth, the issue in question was whether the military judge abused his discretion by denying production of Denbeaux, who was slated to testify as an expert critic of handwriting analysis.

=== High-profile cases ===
Denbeaux defended Sydney Biddle Barrows, the "Mayflower Madam," in 1984. Barrows ran Cachet, an escort service in New York City, from 1979 until 1984, when the service was shut down. She was charged with promoting prostitution by the Manhattan District Attorney's Office. She eventually pleaded guilty.

In 1997, Denbeaux served as a forensic expert for the trial of Timothy McVeigh, charged with bombing the Oklahoma Federal Building.

=== Private practice ===
Denbeaux serves as Attorney of Counsel for the family law firm Denbeaux and Denbeaux.

== Personal life ==
The son of a combat chaplain who served with the Third United States Army during World War II. Denbeaux has been a resident of Woodcliff Lake, New Jersey.

== Publications ==
=== Books ===
- Trial Evidence, (I.C.L.E.), (with Michael Risinger), 1978
- New Jersey Evidentiary Foundations, Denbeaux, Arseneault and Imwinkelried, The Michie Company, 1995.
- The Guantánamo Lawyers: Inside a Prison, Outside the Law, edited with Jonathan Hafetz, 2010

=== Center for Policy and Research, Guantanamo Reports ===
- Report on Guantanamo Detainees: A Profile of 517 Detainees through Analysis of Department of Defense Data, February 8, 2006 (with Joshua Denbeaux, David Gratz, John Gregorek, Matthew Darby, Shana Edwards, Shane Hartman, Daniel Mann, and Helen Skinner).
- Second Report on the Guantanamo Detainees: Inter- and Intra-Departmental Disagreements About Who Is Our Enemy, March 20, 2006 (with Joshua Denbeaux, David Gratz, John Gregorek, Matthew Darby, Shana Edwards, Shane Hartman, Daniel Mann, and Helen Skinner).
- The Guantanamo Detainees During Detention: Data From Department of Defense Records, July 10, 2006 (with Joshua Denbeaux, David Gratz, John Gregorek, Matthew Darby, Shana Edwards, Shane Hartman, Daniel Mann, Megan Sassaman, and Helen Skinner).
- June 10 Suicides at Guantanamo, August 21, 2006 (with Joshua Denbeaux, David Gratz, John Gregorek, Matthew Darby, Shana Edwards, Shane Hartman, Daniel Mann, Megan Sassaman, and Helen Skinner).
- No-Hearing Hearings CSRT: The Modern Habeas Corpus? An Analysis of the Proceeding of the Government's Combatant Status Review Tribunals at Guantanamo, November 17, 2006 (with Joshua Denbeaux, David Gratz, John Gregorek, Matthew Darby, Shana Edwards, Shane Hartman, Daniel Mann, Megan Sassaman, and Helen Skinner).
- The Meaning of "Battlefield": An Analysis of the Government’s Representations of "Battlefield Capture" and "Recidivism" of the Guantánamo Detainees, December 10, 2007 (with Joshua Denbeaux, Grace Brown, Jillian Camarote, Douglas Eadie, Jennifer Ellick, Daniel Lorenzo, Mark Muoio, Courtney Ray, and Nebroisa Zlatanovic).
- Captured on Tape: Interrogation and Videotaping of Detainees in Guantánamo, February 7, 2008 (with Joshua Denbeaux, Jennifer Ellick, Michael Ricciardelli, Matthew Darby).
- Justice Scalia, the Department of Defense, and the Perpetuation of an Urban Legend: The Truth About the Alleged Recidivism of Released Guantánamo Detainees, June 16, 2008 (with Joshua Denbeaux, Daniel Lorenzo, Mark Muoio, Grace Brown, Jennifer Ellick, Jillian Camarote, Douglas Eadie, and Paul Taylor).
- Released Guantánamo Detainees and the Department of Defense: Propaganda by the Numbers?, January 15, 2009 (with Joshua Denbeaux, R. David Gratz, Daniel Lorenzo, Mark Muoio, Grace Brown, Jullian Camarote, Douglas Eadie, Jennifer Ellick, Paul Taylor, Adam Deutsch, Michael Patterson, Gabrielle Hughes, and Michelle Fish).
- Profile of Released Guantánamo Detainees: The Government's Story Then and Now, August 4, 2008 (with Joshua Denbeaux, Adam Deutsch, James Hlavenka, Gabrielle Hughes, Brianna Kostecka, Michael Patterson, Paul Taylor, and Anthony Torntore).
- Torture: Who Knew? An Analysis of the FBI and Department of Defense Reactions to Harsh Interrogation Methods at Guantanamo, April 1, 2009 (with Joshua Denbeaux, David Gratz, Megan Sassaman, Daniel Mann, Mathew Darby, Michael Ricciardelli, Jennifer Ellick, Grace Brown, Jillian Camarote, Douglas Eadie, Daniel Lorenzo, Mark Muoio, and Courtney Ray).
- Revisionist Recidivism: A New Analysis of the Government's Representations of Alleged "Recidivism" of the Guantánamo Detainees, June 5, 2009 (with Joshua Denbeaux, David Gratz, Sean Camoni, Adam Deutsch, Michael McDonough, Michael Patterson, Michelle Fish, Gabrielle Hughes, Paul Taylor, Brian Beroth, Scott Buerkle, Megan Chrisner, Jesse Dresser, Shannon Sterritt, and Kelli Stout).
- Death in Camp Delta, December 7, 2009 (with Brian Beroth, Scott Buerkle, Sean Camoni, Meghan Chrisner, Adam Deutsch, Jesse Dresser, Doug Eadie, Michelle Fish, Marissa Litwin, Michael McDonough, Michael Patterson, Shannon Sterrit, Kelli Stout, and Paul Taylor).
- DOD Contradicts DOD: An Analysis of the Response to Death in Camp Delta, February 3, 2010 (with Brian Beroth, Scott Buerkle, Sean Camoni, Meghan Chrisner, Adam Deutsch, Jesse Dresser, Michelle Fish, Marissa Litwin, Michael McDonough, Michael Patterson, Shannon Sterritt, Kelli Stout, and Paul Taylor).
- Guantanamo: America's Battle Lab January 12, 2015 (with Jonathan Hafetz, Joshua Denbeaux, Erin Hendrix, Chelsea Perdue, Kelly Ross, Lauren Winchester, and Joseph Hickman).
- Drug Abuse: An Exploration of the Government's Use of Mefloquine at Guantanamo, February 12, 2011 (with Sean Camoni, Brian Beroth, Meghan Chrisner, Chrystal Loyer, Kelli Stout, and Paul Taylor).
- Rumsfeld Knew: DoD's "Worst of the Worst" and Recidivism Claims Refuted by Recently Declassified Memo, March 3, 2011 (with Sean Camoni, Paul Taylor, and Philip Taylor).
- The Guantanamo Diet: Actual Facts About Detainee Weight Changes, May 24, 2011 (with Paul Taylor, Sean Kennedy, Sean CAmoni, Kelly Ann Taddonio, Meghan Chrisner, Brian Beroth, Kelli Stout, Chrystal Loyer, Nick Stratton, Lauren Winchester, and Phillip Taylor).

=== Center for Policy and Research, Other Reports ===
- Global War on Terror Timeline: September 11, 2001 to January 20, 2009, January 5, 2017 (with Brian Beroth, Adam Deutsch, Nicholas Stratton, and Phillip Taylor).
- Racial Profiling report: Bloomfield Police and Bloomfield Municipal Court, April 7, 2016 (with Kelley Kearns and Michael J. Ricciardelli).
- The Government's Hostage: The Conviction and Execution of Ethel Rosenberg, December 15, 2016 (with Shannon Dolan, Robert Graber, Elizabeth Mancuso, and Theodore Tanzer).
- Costs and Consequences of Arming America's Law Enforcement with Combat Equipment, September 7, 2014 (with Jeremy Dack, Dakota Gallivan, Lucas Morgan, Jared Stepp, and Joshua Wirtshafter).
- Lehman Brothers: A License to Fail with Other People's Money, September 7, 2012 (with Edward Dabek, John Gregorek, Sean A. Kennedy, and Eric Miller).

=== Articles ===
- "Trust, Cynicism, and Machiavellianism Among First Year Law Students, 53 Journal of Urban Law 397" (1976).
- "Restitution and Mass Actions: A Solution to the Problems of Class Actions," 10 Seton Hall L. Rev. 273 (1979).
- "Questioning Questions: Problems of Form in the Interrogation of Witness," 33 Arkansas L. Rev. 439 (1980) (with Risinger).
- "The First Word of the First Amendment," Northwestern University L. Rev. (1988).
- "Exorcism of Ignorance as a Proxy for Rational Knowledge: The Lessons of Handwriting Identification 'Expertise'," U. of Pa. L. Rev. (1989) (with Risinger & Saks).
- "Brave New 'Post- Daubert World'--A Reply to Professor Moenssens," 29 Seton Hall L. Rev. 405 (1998) (with Risinger and Saks).

=== Book review ===
- "Resignation in Protest: Political and Ethical Choices Between Loyalty to Team and Loyalty to Conscience in American Public Life," 4 Hofstra L. Rev. (1976).

=== Sponsored research ===
- American Bar Foundation, 1974–78. Recipient of a grant, with Professor Alan Katz of Fairfield University, Fairfield, Connecticut, to conduct a longitudinal study on law student attitudes toward politics, law and legal education
- "Alteration or Elaboration: Does Law School Instill Cynicism?," (with Alan Katz), National Conferences on Teaching Professional Responsibility, Detroit, Michigan, Sept. 1977
