= List of habeas petitions filed on behalf of War on Terror detainees =

The United States has published multiple lists of the habeas corpus petitions filed on behalf of detainees apprehended in the course of its war on terror. It was the position of the Bush Presidency that none of these detainees were entitled to have writs of habeas corpus considered by the US Justice system. But some jurists differed. And several habeas corpus cases have been considered by the United States Supreme Court, or are scheduled to be considered by the Supreme Court.

== Habeas petitions for detainees who have been repatriated ==
The Bush Presidency argued that Guantanamo detainees who have been repatriated from Guantanamo should have their cases dismissed as moot. The determination that these detainees were "enemy combatants" remain in effect.

Exhibit B: List Of Enemy Combatant Detainees With Pending Habeas Corpus Petitions Who Have Been Released From United States Custody, as of April 2007
Case Number	Judge	Case Name	Petitioner's Name	ISN	Status
02-CV-0828	Kollar-Kotelly	Al-Odah v. United States	Omar Rajab Amin	00065	Left GTMO
02-CV-0828	Kollar-Kotelly	Al-Odah v. United States	Nasser Nijer Naser Al Mutairi	00205	Left GTMO
02-CV-0828	Kollar-Kotelly	Al-Odah v. United States	Abdulaziz Sayer Owain Al Shammari	00217	Left GTMO
02-CV-0828	Kollar-Kotelly	Al-Odah v. United States	Abdullah Saleh Ali Al Ajmi	00220	Left GTMO
02-CV-0828	Kollar-Kotelly	Al-Odah v. United States	Abdullah Kamal Abdullah Kamal Al Kandari	00228	Left GTMO
02-CV-0828	Kollar-Kotelly	Al-Odah v. United States	Mohammed Funaitel Al Dihani	00229	Left GTMO
02-CV-0828	Kollar-Kotelly	Al-Odah v. United States	Adil Zamil Abdull Mohssin Al Zamil	00568	Left GTMO
02-CV-0828	Kollar-Kotelly	Al-Odah v. United States	Saad Madai Saad Ha Wash Al-Azmi	00571	Left GTMO
02-CV-1130	Kollar-Kotelly	Habib v. Bush	Mamdouh Habib	00661	Left GTMO
04-CV-1135	Huvelle	Kurnaz v. Bush	Murat Kurnaz	00061	Left GTMO
04-CV-1137	Collyer	Begg v. Bush	Feroz Ali Abbasi	00024	Left GTMO
04-CV-1137	Collyer	Begg v. Bush	Moazzam Begg	00558	Left GTMO
04-CV-1142	Leon	Khalid v. Bush	Ridouane Khalid	00173	Left GTMO
04-CV-1144	Roberts	El-Banna v. Bush	Bisher Al Rawi	00906	Left GTMO
04-CV-1144	Roberts	El-Banna v. Bush	Martin Mubanga	10007	Left GTMO
04-CV-1227	Walton	Almurbati v. Bush	Adel Kamel Abdulla Hajee	00060	Left GTMO
04-CV-1227	Walton	Almurbati v. Bush	Abdullah Majed Sayyah Hasan Alnoaimi	00159	Left GTMO
04-CV-1227	Walton	Almurbati v. Bush	Salah Abdul Rasool Al Bloushi	00227	Left GTMO
04-CV-1227	Walton	Almurbati v. Bush	Salman Bin Ibrahim Bin Mohammed Bin Ali Al-Kalifa	00246	Left GTMO
04-CV-2215	Collyer	Deghayes v. Bush	Jamel Abdullah Kiyemba	00701	Left GTMO
05-CV-0301	Kessler	Al-Joudi v. Bush	Majid Abdulla Al Joudi	00025	Left GTMO
05-CV-0301	Kessler	Al-Joudi v. Bush	Abdulla Mohammad Al Ghanmi	00266	Left GTMO
05-CV-0345	Bates	Al-Anazi v. Bush	Ibrahim Suleiman Al-Rubaish	00192	Left GTMO
05-CV-0345	Bates	Al-Anazi v. Bush	Adel Egla Hussan Al-Nussairi	00308	Left GTMO
05-CV-0454	Urbina	Qayed v. Bush	Rashid Abdul Mosleh Qayed	00344	Left GTMO
05-CV-0490	Friedman	Al-Shihry v. Bush	Abdul-Salam Gaithan Mureef Al-Shihry	00132	Left GTMO
05-CV-0520	Urbina	Al-Oshan v. Bush	Musa Al Madany	00058	Left GTMO
05-CV-0533	Leon	Al-Oshan v. Bush	Sulaiman Saad Mohaammed Al-Oshan	00121	Left GTMO
05-CV-0586	Roberts	Al Rashaidan v. Bush	Abdullah Ibrahim Abdullah Al Rashaidan	00343	Left GTMO
05-CV-0621	Friedman	Mokit v. Bush	Wahidof Abdul Mokit	00090	Left GTMO
05-CV-0714	Bates	Battayav v. Bush	Elham Battayav	00084	Left GTMO
05-CV-0764	Kollar-Kotelly	Imran v. Bush	Lahcen Ikasrien	00072	Left GTMO
05-CV-0764	Kollar-Kotelly	Imran v. Bush	Najeeb Al Husseini	00075	Left GTMO
05-CV-0764	Kollar-Kotelly	Imran v. Bush	Tareq	00133	Left GTMO
05-CV-0764	Kollar-Kotelly	Imran v. Bush	Moussa	00270	Left GTMO
05-CV-0764	Kollar-Kotelly	Imran v. Bush	Mohammed Mazoz	00294	Left GTMO
05-CV-0764	Kollar-Kotelly	Imran v. Bush	Ridouane Shakur	00499	Left GTMO
05-CV-0885	Kessler	Mohammad v. Bush	Alif Mohammad	00972	Left GTMO
05-CV-1002	Sullivan	Mohammed v. Bush	Akhtar Mohammed	00845	Left GTMO
05-CV-1008	Bates	Mangut v. Bush	Habibullah Mangut	00907	Left GTMO
05-CV-1010	Leon	Khan v. Bush	Mohabat Khan	00909	Left GTMO
05-CV-1242	Lamberth	Pirzai v. Bush	Ahsanullah Pirzai	00562	Left GTMO
05-CV-1243	Lamberth	Peerzai v. Bush	Ihsan Ullah Peerzai	00562	Left GTMO
05-CV-1246	Roberts	Mohammadi v. Bush	Abdul Majid Mohammadi	00555	Left GTMO
05-CV-1311	Lamberth	Ullah v. Bush	Ehsan Ullah	00562	Left GTMO
05-CV-1453	Urbina	Al-Subaiy v. Bush	Nasser Mazyad Abdullah Al-Subaiy	00497	Left GTMO
05-CV-1489	Urbina	Faizullah v. Bush	Faizullah	00919	Left GTMO
05-CV-1491		Khan v. Bush	Swar Khan	00933	
05-CV-1493	Walton	Amon v. Bush	Mohammed Amon	01074	Left GTMO
05-CV-1667	Walton	Al-Siba'i v. Bush	Abdul-Hadi Muhammed Al-Siba'i	00064	Left GTMO
05-CV-1668	Kessler	Al-Uwaidah v. Bush	Rashid Awadh Rashid Al-Uwaidah	00664	Left GTMO
05-CV-1669	Hogan	Al-Jutaili v. Bush	Fahd Bin Salih Bin Sulaiman Al-Jutaili	00177	Left GTMO
05-CV-1697	Walton	Khandan v. Bush	Kadeer Khandan	00831	Left GTMO
05-CV-1714	Roberts	Al-Rubaish v. Bush	Yousif Abdullah Al-Rubaish	00109	Left GTMO
05-CV-1857	Kollar-Kotelly	Al-Harbi v. Bush	Mazin Salih Al-Harbi	00588	Deceased
05-CV-2104	Walton	Ali Al Jayfi v. Bush	Issam Hamid Ali Bin Ali Al Jayfi	00183	Left GTMO
05-CV-2197	Kennedy	Al-Asadi v. Bush	Mohammed Ahmed Ali Al-Asadi	00198	Left GTMO
05-CV-2216	Lamberth	Al Subaie v. Bush	Alghamdi Abdulrahman Othman A	00095	Left GTMO
05-CV-2216	Lamberth	Al Subaie v. Bush	Mohammed Bin Jaied Bin Aladi Al Mohammed Al Subaie	00319	Left GTMO
05-CV-2369	Roberts	Alsaaei v. Bush	Abdullah Ali Saleh Gerab Alsaaei	00340	Left GTMO
05-CV-2384	Roberts	Said v. Bush	Anwar Handan Al Shimmiri	00226	Left GTMO
05-CV-2385	Urbina	Al Halmandy v. Bush	Abd Al Rahman Abdullah Al Halmandy	00118	Left GTMO
05-CV-2385	Urbina	Al Halmandy v. Bush	Inshanullah	00367	Left GTMO
05-CV-2385	Urbina	Al Halmandy v. Bush	Shamsullah	00783	Left GTMO
05-CV-2386	Walton	Mohammon v. Bush	Maged LNU	00025	Left GTMO
05-CV-2386	Walton	Mohammon v. Bush	Slaim Harbi	00057	Left GTMO
05-CV-2386	Walton	Mohammon v. Bush	Mishal Al Madany	00058	Left GTMO
05-CV-2386	Walton	Mohammon v. Bush	Najeeb LNU	00075	Left GTMO
05-CV-2386	Walton	Mohammon v. Bush	Elham Bataif	00084	Left GTMO
05-CV-2386	Walton	Mohammon v. Bush	Mohsen LNU	00193	Left GTMO
05-CV-2386	Walton	Mohammon v. Bush	Mohammed Rimi	00194	Left GTMO
05-CV-2386	Walton	Mohammon v. Bush	Abdul Salam Deiff	00306	Left GTMO
05-CV-2386	Walton	Mohammon v. Bush	Seed Farha	00341	Left GTMO
05-CV-2386	Walton	Mohammon v. Bush	Saleh Mohammed Ali Azoba	00501	Left GTMO
05-CV-2386	Walton	Mohammon v. Bush	Abdullah LNU	00528	Left GTMO
05-CV-2386	Walton	Mohammon v. Bush	Abdullah Al Quatany	00652	Left GTMO
05-CV-2386	Walton	Mohammon v. Bush	Abdullah Hamid Musleh Qahtany	00652	Left GTMO
05-CV-2427	Leon	Rimi v. Bush	Mohammad Rimi	00194	Left GTMO
05-CV-2452	Friedman	Al Salami v. Bush	Abdullah Al Sali Al Asoriya	00340	Left GTMO
05-CV-2452	Friedman	Al Salami v. Bush	Saleh Ali Abdullah Al Salami	00693	Deceased
05-CV-2466	Lamberth	Khan v. Bush	Anwar Khan	00948	Left GTMO
06-CV-1675	Walton	Wasim v. Bush	Wasim	00338	Left GTMO
06-CV-1677	Lamberth	Naseem v. Bush	Mohammed Naseem	00453	Left GTMO
06-CV-1678	Lamberth	Khan v. Bush	Gulbas Khan	00316	Left GTMO
06-CV-1768	Roberts	Al-Maliki v. Bush	Saed Farhan Al-Maliki	00157	Left GTMO

== See also ==
- Guantanamo Bay attorneys
- Guantanamo military commissions
- OARDEC
