= List of Kuwaiti detainees at Guantanamo Bay =

Twelve Kuwaiti detainees were held in extrajudicial detention in the United States Guantanamo Bay detention camps, in Cuba.

The last Kuwaiti, Fayiz Al Kandari, was repatriated in January 2016. The US had accused the 12 Kuwaitis of being associated with or were members of al-Qaeda or the Taliban. All 12 men denied the charges. Most of the men said they were on charitable missions and all said they were sold to American forces for bounty. None of the Kuwaiti prisoners held in Cuba was ever charged with a crime.

== Releases ==
Nasser Al Mutairi (ISN 205) was the first Kuwaiti released in January 2005. Al Mutairi said he traveled to Afghanistan for ribat, according to his Combatant Status Review Tribunal transcripts. In November 2005, the Department of Defense transferred five more prisoners to Kuwait including Adel Al Zamel (ISN 568), who prior to his time in Guantanamo was convicted and sentenced to a year in prison for previous charges of assault against a female college student. Zamel denied assaulting the woman, according to journalist Jenifer Fenton who met with him in Kuwait.

Abdulaziz Al Shammeri (ISN 217) was released at the same time as Al Zamel. He was married and had two children, who in 2001 were six and two years old. He was an Islamic scholar and worked at the Ministry of Islamic Affairs in Kuwait. He was planning to get a Master's degree in Egypt, but decided before doing so he would spend some time teaching Islamic law in Afghanistan. "In my case I don't even know why I was transferred there (Guantanamo)... and then I have no idea how I was released," he told Fenton.

The third prisoner released in late 2005 Sa'ad Al Azmi (ISN 571) said he traveled to Pakistan on a business trip. He reported he was severely abused as well: beaten, left naked for two months, sexually humiliated and his leg was broken. Released in 2005 as well was Mohammed Al Dehani (ISN 299), who worked as an auditor for the Kuwait government. The last of the group released in late 2005 was Kuwaiti prisoner Abdullah Al Ajmi (ISN 220), who was 23 years old when captured. He had trained as a soldier in the Kuwait military. Abdullah blew himself up in a suicide attack in Mosul, Iraq in 2008. Several Iraqis were killed.

According to US embassy files published by WikiLeaks, in 2006 after a direct appeal by the then Kuwaiti Emir Sheikh Sabah Al Ahmad Al Jaber Al Sabah to then-President George W. Bush, Omar Rajab Amin (ISN 65) and Abdullah Kamel Al Kandari (ISN 228) were freed. Amin was an aid worker and Kamel Al Kandari had been a star volleyball player, who played for Kuwait's national team.

Two prisoners Fouad Al Rabiah (ISN 551) and Khalid Al Mutairi (ISN 213) were ordered released by American courts in 2009. The ruling by which Fouad, an aviation engineer, was freed stated the U.S. government's evidence was "surprisingly bare," noting that interrogators used "abusive techniques." Fouad, who returned to Kuwait in December 2009, was the oldest of the Kuwaiti prisoners. He had a documented history of doing charitable work with reputable organizations in Kosovo, Bosnia and Bangladesh. He planned to help people in Afghanistan. Instead, he lost eight years of his life and missed watching his four children grow up. "I lost so many things, but I know that I was right," he said. "I know that they were wrong," according to an interview he gave after his release.

Fawzi al Odah was cleared for transfer by the Periodic Review Board and transferred to Kuwait in late 2014. Fayiz al Kandari was cleared by the Periodic Review board during his second hearing and sent home in early 2016. Both al Odah and al Kandari spent time in Kuwait's rehabilitation center.

== Case Developments ==
=== Habeas Case Delays ===
In February, Federal Judge Colleen Kollar-Kotelly Colleen Kollar-Kotelly "lashed out" at government prosecutors for "repeated delays" in the case of the four Kuwaitis detained at Guantanamo Bay. The Judge ordered one government lawyer removed from the case for failing to comply with repeated orders to produce requested declassified evidence, explaining in a court document his "compliance was not optional." She continued in document, that the court "has serious concern about counsel's ability to read and comprehend its orders." According to Agence France-Presse Agence France Presse, "The rare public row between the judge and prosecutors reflects frustrations over delays to appeals by Guantanamo prisoners in federal courts."

On June 9, 2009, the lead attorney for the Kuwaiti detainees at Guantanamo, David Cynamon, called on Congress to delay the confirmation hearings for Supreme Court nominee Sonia Sotomayor until the Obama administration's commitment to the rule of law and compliance with Supreme Court decisions is examined. In the letter , Cynamon asks Judiciary Committee Chairman Patrick Leahy (D-VT) to first schedule a Judiciary Committee hearing on the Obama Administration's failure to comply with Boumediene v. Bush.

"The Bush Administration Department of Justice did everything in its power to delay and obstruct the habeas cases from proceeding in federal court. This was disappointing but not surprising," Cynamon wrote in the letter. "What has been surprising is that the Obama Justice Department has maintained the same policy of delay and obstruction."

=== Progress in Two of the Four Kuwaiti Detainees' Cases ===
Two of the four Kuwaiti detainees are expected to be handed over to Kuwaiti authorities after negotiations, Major Barry Wingard , Fayiz Al-Kandari's military attorney, said at a press conference in Kuwait on June 9, 2009. While the administration maintains that two other Kuwaiti detainees, Fayiz Mohammed Ahmed Al-Kandari and Fouad Mahmoud Al-Rabiah, will face charges, Major Wingard said there is a lack of evidence in Fayiz's case. There is "not enough proof to try him [Fayiz]" in a U.S. federal court, Wingard said.

=== U.S. Promises to Review Kuwaiti Detainee Cases ===
In April 2009, the United States promised to review the cases of the four Kuwaiti Guantanamo detainees after U.S. Secretary of State Hillary Clinton visited Kuwait and met with the country's Ministry of Foreign Affairs. "Clinton promised that Washington would rapidly and seriously review the files of the four Kuwaiti prisoners and notify Kuwait in this regard as soon as possible," the Kuwait News Agency reported, citing a statement by Kuwait's Ministry of Foreign Affairs.

=== 2008 Military Commissions Filing ===
In March 2008, attorneys for Fawzi al-Odah and three other Kuwaiti detainees held at Guantanamo Bay filed an emergency petition with the U.S. Court of Military Commission seeking to block military prosecutors from contacting the four detainees without their attorneys' consent. The attorneys' petition for a writ of mandamus – or other appropriate order – was due to concerns that military prosecutors had violated, or intended to violate, military and professional rules of legal conduct.

Matthew MacLean, a Washington-based attorney for the Kuwaitis, explained in an interview with the Associated Press that government interrogators told his clients their lawyers are Jewish in a bid to sow mistrust. "Are these prosecutors bound by the rules that are binding on all prosecutors everywhere?" MacLean said. "Or are these prosecutors going to be allowed to be cowboys, doing whatever they want?"

=== Boumediene v. Bush ===
On June 12, 2008, the United States Supreme Court ruled, in Boumediene v. Bush, that the Military Commissions Act could not remove the right for Guantanamo detainees to access the US Federal Court system. Further, all previous Guantanamo detainees' habeas petitions were eligible to be re-instated.

On July 18, 2008, David J. Cynamon filed a "PETITIONERS' STATUS REPORT" in Al Odah, v. United States Civil Action No. CV 02-0828 (CKK) on behalf of Fawzi Khalid Abdullah Fahad Al Odah, Fayiz Mohammed Ahmen Al Kandari, Khalid Abdullah Mishal Al Mutairi, Fouad Mahmoud Al Rabiah. He wrote that they were the four remaining Kuwaiti detainees in Guantanamo. He wrote that none of the four men had been cleared for release. He wrote that the government had completed "factual returns" for all four men—but those factual returns had contained redacted sections.

Military Commissions Act

The Military Commissions Act of 2006 mandated that Guantanamo detainees were no longer entitled to access the US civil justice system, so all outstanding habeas corpus petitions were stayed.

== Kuwaiti detainees ==
isn	name	arrival date	departure date	notes
ISN 65	Omar Rajab Amin	2002-01-12	2006-09-06	Allegedly named on a suspicious list.; Allegedly a member of the NGO Kuwaiti Joint Relief Committee.; Released.; Claims he was sold, for a bounty.
205	Nasser Najiri Amtiri	2002-02-07	2005-01-16	Alleged to have fought on the front lines.
213	Khalid Abdullah Mishal al Mutairi	2002-02-09	2009-10-09	Named differently on the official lists of names.; Allegedly named on a suspicious list.; Allegedly donated money to Al Wafa.; Repatriated, convicted, conviction overturned on appeal.; Colleen Kollar-Kotelly ordered his release, following his habeas corpus review, on July 29, 2009.; Repatriated on October 9, 2009.
217	Abd Al Aziz Sayer Uwain Al Shammeri	2002-02-10	2005-11-02	Allegedly named on a suspicious list.; Allegedly led other detainees to be non-compliant.; Allegedly visited the al Qaida Media House.; Allegedly associated with members of al Wafa.; Was present during the riot at Mazari Sharif.
220	Abdallah Saleh Ali Al Ajmi	2002-01-17	2005-11-02	Alleged to have admitted being a fighter in Afghanistan.; Abdullah Al-Ajmi launched a suicide attack in Mosul in Iraq.; Denied ever being in Afghanistan.; Was the first detainee to have a Tribunal convened.
228	Abdullah Kamel Abudallah Kamel	2002-05-01	2005-11-02	Captured wearing a Casio watch.; Name found on a suspicious list.; Named inconsistently on official documents.
229	Mohammed Fenaitel Mohamed Al Daihani	2002-05-03	2005-11-02	Allegedly named on a suspicious list.; Claims he was sold for a bounty.; Donated $2500 to dig five rural wells to a charity the USA suspected of ties to terrorims.
232	Fouzi Khalid Abdullah al Awda	2002-02-12	2014-11-05	
551	Fouad Mahmoud al Rabiah	2002-05-01	2002-05-01	Allegedly delivered money to Osama bin Laden personally, and to al Qaeda through the suspect Afghan-based charity al Wafa.; Claims he met bin Laden solely at social functions, when he was on a fact-finding mission for legitimate Kuwaiti-based charities.; Allegedly was negotiating logistics contracts with al Qaeda.; Allegedly named on suspicious lists.
552	Faiz Mohammed Ahmed Al Kandari	2002-05-01	2016-01-08	Allegedly an al Qaeda recruiter.; Allegedly named on a suspicious list.; Allegedly Osama bin Laden's spiritual adviser.; James R. Crisfield, the Tribunal's legal advisor confirmed that the determination that Al Kandari was an "enemy combatant" was based on "hearsay evidence".
568	Adel Zamel Abd Al Mahsen Al Zamel	2002-05-04	2005-11-02	Allegedly one of the founders of the suspect Afghanistan-based charity al Wafa.; Allegedly knows some of the al Qaeda's inner circle, including Faiz Al Kandari, reportedly Osama bin Laden's religious advisor.; Repatriated, charged in Kuwait, tried, and acquitted of all charges.
571	Sa ad Madhi Sa ad Howash Al Azmi	2002-05-01	2005-11-02	Allegedly worked for the suspect charity al Wafa.; Allegedly ran a safehouse.; Allegedly knew senior members of al Qaeda.; Repatriated on November 4, 2005. Charged and acquitted in Kuwait on May 22, 2006.

== Media coverage ==
1. Major Issues to be Discussed Premier's US Visit Timely,", Kuwait Times, September 15, 2008.

2. William Glaberson, "Despite Ruling, Detainee Cases Facing Delays,", New York Times, October 4, 2008.

3. "2 Kuwaitis at Guantanamo Bay Charged with War Crimes", USA Today, October 22, 2008.

4. "Obama's Election Bodes Changes for Guantanamo Prisoners,", Agence France-Presse, November 16, 2008.

5. "Court orders new review on torture, allows tobacco lawsuits", SCOTUS Blog, December 15, 2008.

6. Ben Garcia, "Gitmo Detainees' Fate Undecided,", Kuwait Times, January 27, 2009.

7. David Cynamon, "A Glossy View of Guantanamo Bay", Washington Post, March 22, 2009.

8. Zachary Roth, "Not Just State Secrets", Talking Points Memo, April 10, 2009.

9. "U.S. Judge Lambasts Government Guantanamo Lawyers", Agence France-Presse, April 8, 2009.

8. Josh Gerstein, "Judge Riles at DOJ in Gitmo Case", Politico, April 6, 2009.

== Resources ==
1. Kuwaiti Family Committee:

2. Amnesty International:

3. Human Rights Watch:
