= Fouzi Khalid Abdullah Al Odah =

Kuwaiti former Guantanamo Bay detainee (born 1977)

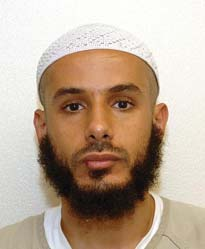
- Born: May 6, 1977 (age 49); Kuwait City, Kuwait
- Detained at: Guantanamo
- Other name: Fawzi Khalid Abdullah Fahad al Odah
- ISN: 232
- Status: transferred to rehabilitation center in Kuwait

Fouzi Khalid Abdullah Al Odah is a Kuwaiti citizen formerly held in the United States Guantanamo Bay detainment camps, in Cuba. He had been detained without charge in Guantanamo Bay since 2002. He was a plaintiff in the ongoing case, Al Odah v. United States, which challenged his detention, along with that of fellow detainees. The case was widely acknowledged to be one of the most significant to be heard by the Supreme Court in the current term. The US Department of Defense reports that he was born in 1977, in Kuwait City, Kuwait.

U.S. District Court Judge Colleen Kollar-Kotelly's ruling on al Odah's habeas corpus petition was published on September 1, 2009. She denied his habeas corpus petition based on the assumption that it was more likely than not that Odah was a foot soldier fighting in Afghanistan against US troops.

Fouzi Khalid Abdullah Al Odah arrived at the Guantanamo detention camps on February 28, 2002, where he remained for 12 years, 8 months, 8 days until his transfer to Kuwait's rehabilitation program for former Guantanamo detainees on November 5, 2014.

== Alleged affiliation with al Qaeda ==
The U.S. Government contends that al Odah's true purpose in Afghanistan was to join the Taliban and al Qaeda. Supporting this, al Odah's name and phone number appeared in a document found on the official al Qaeda website, and his passport was recovered from an al Qaeda safehouse in Karachi. The appellate court's rejection of his habeas corpus petition also refers to "additional incriminating evidence" discovered since his capture, however the nature of that evidence is redacted in the unclassified version of the opinion.

== Capture ==
According to an interview Fawzi's father, Khalid al-Odah, gave to Amnesty International, Fawzi traveled in 2001 to the Pakistan/Afghanistan border area in order to do charitable outreach work, Following the attacks of September 11, 2001, Fawzi fled Afghanistan, intending to return home to Kuwait. Fawzi successfully crossed the border into Pakistan but was then captured by Pakistanis that his father alleges were bounty hunters who handed Fawzi and eleven other Kuwaitis over to American authorities. The Kuwaitis were then transported to Cuba.

== Official status reviews ==
Originally the Bush Presidency asserted that captives apprehended in the "war on terror" were not covered by the Geneva Conventions, and could be held indefinitely, without charge, and without an open and transparent review of the justifications for their detention. In 2004, the United States Supreme Court ruled, in Rasul v. Bush, that Guantanamo captives were entitled to being informed of the allegations justifying their detention, and were entitled to try to refute them.

=== Office for the Administrative Review of Detained Enemy Combatants ===
Following the Supreme Court's ruling, the Department of Defense set up the Office for the Administrative Review of Detained Enemy Combatants.

Scholars at the Brookings Institution, led by Benjamin Wittes, studied the OARDEC documents and listed the captives still held in Guantanamo in December 2008, according to whether their detention was justified by certain common allegations:

- Fouzi Khalid Abdullah Al Odah was listed as one of the captives who "The military alleges ... are associated with both Al Qaeda and the Taliban."
- Fouzi Khalid Abdullah Al Odah was listed as one of the captives who "The military alleges that the following detainees stayed in Al Qaeda, Taliban or other guest- or safehouses."
- Fouzi Khalid Abdullah Al Odah was listed as one of the captives who "The military alleges ... were at Tora Bora."
- Fouzi Khalid Abdullah Al Odah was listed as one of the captives whose "names or aliases were found on material seized in raids on Al Qaeda safehouses and facilities."
- Fouzi Khalid Abdullah Al Odah was listed as one of the captives who was a foreign fighter.
- Fouzi Khalid Abdullah Al Odah was listed as one of the "34 [captives] admit to some lesser measure of affiliation—like staying in Taliban or Al Qaeda guesthouses or spending time at one of their training camps."
- Fouzi Khalid Abdullah Al Odah was listed as one of the captives who had admitted "some form of associational conduct."

=== Habeas corpus petition ===
Habeas corpus petition of Fouzi Khalid Abdullah Al Odah et al

Al Odah v. United States was a writ of habeas corpus petition on behalf of Guantanamo detainees. This consolidated case currently represents four plaintiffs: Fawzi Khalid Abdullah Fahad Al Odah, Fayiz Mohammed, Ahmed Al Kandari, Khalid Abdullah Mishal Al Mutairi, and Fouad Mahmoud Al Rabiah. Al Odah v. United States was originally filed April 2002 on behalf of twelve imprisoned Kuwaitis, including Al Odah, seeking the right of habeas corpus. The case was dismissed in May 2002 following a government motion to dismiss the habeas corpus petition.

On June 28, 2004, the Supreme Court issued an opinion on a related Guantanamo case, Rasul v. Bush, affirming the right of Guantanamo detainees to challenge their imprisonment in the U.S. federal court system. Under this ruling, detainees such as those represented in Al Odah would be able to file habeas corpus petitions in U.S. courts.

In April 2007, the Supreme Court declined to hear two cases challenging the Military Commissions Act: Boumediene v. Bush and Al Odah v. United States On June 29, 2007, the court reversed that decision, releasing an order that expressed their intent to hear the challenge. The two cases have been consolidated into one. Oral arguments were heard on December 5, 2007. The decision, striking down the Military Commissions Act, was handed down on June 12, 2008.

On July 18, 2008, David J. Cynamon filed a "PETITIONERS’ STATUS REPORT" in Al Odah, v. United States Civil Action No. CV 02-0828 (CKK) on behalf of Fawzi Khalid Abdullah Fahad Al Odah, Fayiz Mohammed Ahmen Al Kandari, Khalid Abdullah Mishal Al Mutairi, Fouad Mahmoud Al Rabiah.

He wrote that they were the four remaining Kuwaiti captives in Guantanamo. He wrote that none of the four men had been cleared for release. He wrote that the government had completed "factual returns" for all four men—but those factual returns had contained redacted sections.

=== Joint Review Task Force ===
When he assumed office in January 2009, President Barack Obama made a number of promises about the future of Guantanamo. He promised the use of torture would cease at the camp. He promised to institute a new review system. That new review system was composed of officials from six departments, where the OARDEC reviews were conducted entirely by the Department of Defense. When it reported back, a year later, the Joint Review Task Force classified some individuals as too dangerous to be transferred from Guantanamo, even though there was no evidence to justify laying charges against them. On April 9, 2013, that document was made public after a Freedom of Information Act request. Fouzi Khalid Abdullah Al Odah was one of the 71 individuals deemed too innocent to charge, but too dangerous to release. Although Obama promised that those deemed too innocent to charge, but too dangerous to release would start to receive reviews from a Periodic Review Board less than a quarter of men have received a review.

== Meetings with attorneys ==
On September 28, 2005, the Associated Press reported on a meeting between attorneys Thomas Wilner and Kristine Huskey and their Kuwaiti clients.

Al-Odah told his lawyers that camp authorities had warned the hunger strikers that they would start strapping them in "restraint chairs" during their force-feedings.

In an interview in Marie Claire magazine, Huskey described her surprise that when she first met with Guantanamo clients, like al-Odah, they preferred food brought from Guantanamo fast food outlets to the Arabic delicacies she and her colleagues had brought from the Continental US.

== Media Editorials ==
Fawzi al-Odah's father, Khalid al-Odah, wrote an Op-Ed in the Washington Post, on September 2, 2006, entitled: "Put My Son on Trial -- or Free Him". In the article Khalid argues that "hundreds of innocent men sit in prison", who could have been freed, if American authorities had granted them the protections of the rule of law and granted them a fair trial in a traditional court of law.

Al Odah's father stated that Fawzi had always been an admirer of the American system.

The Washington Post identifies Khalid Al-Odah as the founder of the Kuwaiti Family Committee. It states:

The writer founded the Kuwaiti Family Committee four years ago to secure the legal rights of foreign nationals imprisoned at Guantanamo Bay.

The New York Times editorial board has spoken out in favor of the plaintiffs in the Al Odah v. United States case, calling it "the Supreme Court showdown of the year"."Civil liberties groups — and this Editorial Board", write the editors, "believe it is important for the Supreme Court to make clear that the detainees have a constitutional right to have a judge determine whether they are being properly held.".

== Al Odah v. United States ==
Fouzi Khalid Abdullah Al Odah was among the eleven captives covered in the July 2008 "Petitioners' Status Report" filed by David J. Cynamon in Al Odah v. United States on behalf of the four remaining Kuwaiti prisoners in Guantanamo. Seven other prisoners were amalgamated to the case, which charged that none of the men had been cleared for release, even though the government had completed factual returns for them—and those factual returns had contained redacted sections.

The decision, striking down the Military Commissions Act, was handed down on June 12, 2008.

On May 12, 2007, the Kuwait Times reported that Kuwait and the USA concluded negotiations regarding the repatriation of the remaining Kuwaiti captives. Nevertheless, Khaled Al Mutayri, Fouzi Khalid Abdullah Al Awda, Fouad Mahoud Hasan Al Rabia and Faiz Mohammed Ahmed Al Kandari continue to be held as of August 1, 2009. US District Court Judge Colleen Kollar-Kottely ordered the immediate repatriation of Khaled Al Mutairi on July 29, 2009. According to The Jurist the habeas corpus cases for the other three men are expected to conclude in August and September 2009.

Kollar-Kotelly ruled on al Odah's habeas corpus petition on August 24, 2009. The 32-page ruling was published on September 1, 2009, after classified portions had been redacted. She ruled that the USA could consider al Odah was an "enemy combatant", without regard to whether the training camp he attended was actually the al Farouq training camp, because he had acknowledged attending a training camp, for a single day.

== Renewed repatriation negotiations ==
In July 2013, Cynamon said the Obama administration was renewing repatriation negotiations after "years of radio silence".

== Repatriation in November 2014 ==
He was repatriated in November 2014, following the recommendation of the Periodic Review Board.

== See also ==
- Guantanamo force feeding
