= Sulaiman Abu Ghaith =

One of Al-Qaeda's official spokesmen incarcerated in a US federal prison

Sulaiman Abu Ghaith سليمان بوغيث
- Sulaiman Abu Ghaith sitting with Osama bin Laden and Ayman al-Zawahiri, from an al-Qaeda propaganda tape
- Born: 14 December 1965 (age 60); Kuwait City, Kuwait
- Arrested: 28 February 2013; Amman, Jordan
- Citizenship: Kuwait (Until 2001); Stateless
- Detained at: ADX Florence
- Charge(s): Conspiring to kill Americans and providing material support to terrorists
- Penalty: Life imprisonment

Sulaiman Jassem Sulaiman Ali Abu Ghaith (Arabic: سليمان جاسم سليمان علي أبو غيث; born 14 December 1965) is a Kuwaiti regarded as one of al-Qaeda's spokesmen. He is married to one of Osama bin Laden's daughters. In 2013, Gaith was arrested in Jordan and extradited to the United States. In 2014, he was convicted in a U.S. federal court in New York for "conspiring to kill Americans and providing material support to terrorists" and sentenced to life imprisonment. He is serving his sentence at the federal ADX Florence prison in Colorado.

== Activities during the 1991 Gulf War ==
Abu Ghaith, who grew up with the Muslim Brotherhood, first gained attention during the 1990–1991 Iraqi invasion and occupation of Kuwait. His sermons denouncing the occupation and Iraqi President Saddam Hussein gained him some degree of popularity amongst the Kuwaiti people. In 1992, he went to Bosnia and Herzegovina for nearly a month to do some "relief services" there. He later joined Muslim guerillas in the Bosnian War in summer 1994. The Kuwaiti government subsequently removed him from the mosque and banned him from giving sermons, as he used to criticize the Kuwaiti government and other Arab governments stridently, then he became a high school teacher of religion.

== Arrival in Afghanistan in June 2000 ==
In June 2000, he left Kuwait for Afghanistan, where he met Osama bin Laden and joined his al-Qaeda organization. His affinity for public speaking and comparative youth put him at the head of al-Qaeda's attempt to widen its appeal from ultra-conservative and mostly elderly clerics to the general population and especially the youth of majority-Muslim countries; in this capacity, he quickly became the organization's spokesman.

== Al Wafa ==
According to documents in the unclassified dossier from Adel al Zamel's Combatant Status Review Tribunal Sulaiman Abu Ghaith was also a founder of Al Wafa al Igatha al Islamia, a charity the USA asserts provided a plausible front for al Qaeda's fund-raising efforts. One of the allegations against Al Zamil, who was also accused of being a founder of al Wafa, was that he helped Abu Ghaith's family leave Afghanistan around the time of the attacks of 9–11.

== Al Qaeda video after 9/11 ==
He rose to worldwide attention following the 11 September 2001, attacks. On 10 October 2001, he appeared on two widely circulated videos (first broadcast on al Jazeera television) to defend the attacks and threaten reprisals for the subsequent US invasion of Afghanistan, saying, "Americans should know, the storm of the planes will not stop... Thousands of the Islamic nation's youths are eager to die just as the Americans are eager to live." These statements caused the Kuwaiti government to strip him of his citizenship.

He is also translated as saying:

“This small group that aided the religion of Allah (Glory be to Him), the one that helped the weak at a time when the entire Ummah and the entire world deserted them, did not set out on the basis of a regional issue, nor a nationalist one, nor any such limited cause. Rather, they set out for that great global purpose—the Cause of Islam.”

In 2002, while living in Iran, he posted a statement that al-Qaeda has "the right to kill four million Americans, including one million children, displace double that figure, and injure and cripple hundreds and thousands."

== Alleged connection to the Faylaka Island attackers ==
According to The Long War Journal American officials assert that Sulaiman Abu Ghaith attended al Qaeda's airport training camp with Anas al Kandari and Faiz al Kandari. Anas al Kandari was a young Kuwaiti who fired upon a squad of marines, killing one, in the Faylaka Island attack in 2002. Faiz al Kandari is another Kuwaiti, who was held in extrajudicial detention in Guantanamo from 2002 to 2008. In 2008, charges were prepared against him to be referred to a Guantanamo military commission. According to The Long War Journal in his book The Martyr's Oath, Stewart Bell asserted Sulaiman Abu Ghaith recruited Anas al Kandari and the other shooter to launch the Faylaka Island attacks.

== Presence in Iran 2002–2013 ==
As he moved around to escape capture by the United States in the following months, his whereabouts are unclear. According to the Long War Journal, by 2002, Sulaiman was living in Iran.

In July 2003, a Kuwaiti minister announced that the Iranian government was holding Abu Ghaith and that Kuwait had refused an offer from Iran to extradite him to Kuwait.

In September 2010, the Long War Journal falsely reported that Abu Ghaith had been freed by Iran and had left the country for Afghanistan.

In March 2013, it was reported that Abu Ghaith had spent most of the last ten years in Iran, under house arrest.

== Presence in Turkey 2013 ==
In late January 2013, Abu Ghaith entered Turkey from Iran, staying in a hotel in Ankara. For a brief period, he was detained at the request of the United States but was released since he had committed no crime in Turkey. Turkish authorities held him as "a guest" since he did not have a passport at the time. Rather than extradite him to the United States, the Turkish authorities decided to deport him to his home country, Kuwait.

== Arrest, extradition to the United States, and trial ==
On a stopover in Amman, Jordan, Abu Ghaith was arrested by Jordanian officials and turned over to US authorities on 7 March 2013. He was subsequently extradited to the United States and housed in a federal prison in New York.

Abu Ghaith was indicted on charges of conspiring to kill Americans and tried in the Federal District Court in Manhattan (U.S. v. Abu Ghayth, U.S. District Court, Southern District of New York, No. 98-cr-01023). He pleaded not guilty on 8 March 2013.

On 8 April 2013, Abu Ghaith's attorneys were considering a request for change of venue, since New York City received the greatest loss from the attacks on 11 September 2001. Abu Ghaith's lawyers sought the right to call upon Khalid Sheikh Mohammed as a witness. On 18 March 2014, this request was denied by a New York federal judge.

On 26 March 2014, Abu Ghaith was convicted of "conspiring to kill Americans and providing material support to terrorists" and he was subsequently sentenced to life in prison by U.S. District Judge Lewis A. Kaplan.

On 28 September 2017, the 2nd U.S. Circuit Court of Appeals in Manhattan upheld his conviction.

== Personal life ==
He married his first wife, Fatima, in Kuwait, with whom he had six daughters and a son. He then married an Egyptian woman named Amal, who was detained with him in Iran, with whom he had two daughters; then he married Osama bin Laden's daughter, Fatima, with whom he had a daughter and a son.
