= Al Wafa al Igatha al Islamia =

Afghan Islamic charity organization

Al Wafa is an Islamic charity listed in Executive Order 13224 as an entity that supports terrorism. United States intelligence officials state that it was founded in Afghanistan by Adil Zamil Abdull Mohssin Al Zamil, Abdul Aziz al-Matrafi and Samar Khand. Affiliated groups include The Taliban and Al Qaeda.

According to Saad Madai Saad al-Azmi's Combatant Status Review Tribunal Al Wafa is located in the Wazir Akhbar Khan area of Afghanistan. Al Wafa al Igatha al Islamia, also known with other names like as Wafa Humanitarian Organization, Al Wafa, Al Wafa Organization is an active group.

== Individuals alleged to have affiliation with Al Wafa ==
Individuals alleged to have affiliation with Al Wafa
Name	Notes
Abdul Aziz al-Matrafi	Adil Zamil Abdull Mohssin Al Zamil's CSRT alleges al-Matrafi is one of the founders of Al Wafa.
Zaid Muhamamd Sa'id Al Husayn	"The detainee admits meeting a man named "Suhaib" in Kabul. Suhaib identified himself as being from Saudi Arabia and a member of Al Wafa. Suhaib assisted the detainee with a money exchange.
Saad Madai Saad al-Azmi	Alleged to have worked for Al Wafa for three months in Kabul.
Said Boujaadia	Boujaadia's CSRT allegations state: "The detainee is associated with the al Wafa organization".
Khalid Bin Abdullah Mishal Thamer Al Hameydani	Alleged to have worked for Al Wafa.
Abd Al Aziz Sayer Uwain Al Shammeri	One of the charges in Al Shammeri's Kuwaiti trial was that he helped fund Al Wafa.; Al Shammeri was acquitted.
Abdallah Saleh Ali Al Ajmi	One of the charges in Al Ajmi's Kuwaiti trial was that he helped fund Al Wafa.; Al Ajmi was acquitted.
Abdullah Kamel Abdullah Kamel Al Kandari	
Abdullah Ali Al Utaybi	Bessam Muhammed Saleh Al Dubaikey's Combatant Status Review Tribunal alleges a traveling companion, named Abdullah Ali Al Utaybi, was a director of Al Wafa.
Juma Mohammed Abdul Latif Al Dossary	An al-Qaeda operative said that al Dosari's sheik may have supported al Wafa's efforts in Chechnya.
Abdul Aziz Abdul Rahman Abdul Aziz Al Baddah	Alleged to have sent funds 4.5 million Saudi Riyals to al Wafa, through a hawala.; Alleged to have carried $7,000, by hand, to al Wafa, in June 2001.; Alleged to have stayed in an al Wafa house.; Alleged to have met Abdul Aziz Al Matrafi, and seen him carrying a rifle, and meet with other al Wafa leaders.; Alleged to have fled the US aerial bombardment of Afghanistan in the company of Abdul Aziz al-Matrafi.
Ibrahim Muhammed Ibrahim Al Nasir	Al Nasir's CSRT allegations state: "The detainee visited the Al Wafa director in Kabul, Afghanistan in 2001".
Abd Al Aziz Muhammad Ibrahim Al Nasir	
Sa ad Ibraham Sa ad Al Bidna	Al Bidna's ARB factors state that a Saudi al Qaida facilitator facilitated his illegal entry into Pakistan.
Bessam Muhammed Saleh Al Dubaikey	Detained largely because he spent four days with a traveling companion, named Abdullah Ali Al Utaybi, who American intelligence analysts suspect was a director of Al Wafa.
Sami Mohy El Din Muhammed Al Hajj	Al Jazeera cameraman.; "After serving as the Al-Haramayn Director in Baku, Azerbaijan from 1997 to January 2000, Jiman Mohammed Alawi Al Muraai, aka Abu Wafa, took a job operating the Wafa offices in Karachi, Pakistan."
Mohammed Ali Abdullah Bwazir	
Mohammed Ahmed Said Haidel	Haidel's CSRT allegations state: "The detainee provided general information about an al Wafa office in Kabul".
Mustafa Ahmed Hamlily	Alleged to have worked for Al Wafa in Jalalabad.
Fouad Mahoud Hasan Al Rabia	Alleged that he -likely- transferred money on behalf of Al Wafa.
Faiz Mohammed Ahmed Al Kandari	Al Kandari's ARB factors state: "The detainee was associated with the Al Wafa organization".
Abdul Hakim Abdul Rahman Abdulaziz Al Mousa	Al Mousa's ARB factors state: "information strongly suggests that the detainee may be identifiable with senior personnel of al Wafa".
Mohammed Sulaymon Barre	Ran the local Pakistani office of a Somalian money transfer company, named Dahabshiil, that American counter-terrorism authorities suspected was tied to another money transfer company, named al-Barakat, that they suspected was tied to terrorism.; The 9/11 Commission cleared al-Barakat of the suspicion it had been involved in financing the terrorist attacks of September 11, 2001.
Adil Zamil Abdull Mohssin Al Zamil	Alleged founder.
Jamal Muhammad Alawi Mar'i	Mar'i's CSRT alleges he visited Al Wafa's Kabul office.
Ahmed Abdul Qader	Once met with al-Matrafi.
Allah Nasir	Alleged to have worked for Al Wafa in Herat.
Aminullah Baryalai Tukhi	"Detainee associated with the leader of al Wafa, Abdulla Aziz [sic], and received payments for arranging the travel of individuals to and from Afghanistan."
Ismael Arale	Alleged to have served as a money courier for al Matrafi.
Samar Khand	Alleged founder.
Unidentified Guantanamo detainee	"Detainee observed that the leader of the Al-Wafa office in Kabul, Afghanistan, known as ###### carried a Kalishnikov rifle, as did several of other Al-Wafa workers located there".
Abu Mohammed al-Somali	Alleged to have been a senior leader in al Wafa who may have received funds raised by Abdul Aziz Abdul Rahman Abdul Aziz Al Baddah.
Ramadan Abdul Walid al-Balushi al-Sindi	Alleged to have transported funds raised by Abdul Aziz Abdul Rahman Abdul Aziz Al Baddah to al Wafa.

== See also ==
- List of charities accused of ties to terrorism
- Wafa al Bass
