= Khalid al-Odah =

Kuwaiti activist

Khalid al-Odah is the father of Guantanamo Bay detainee, Fawzi al-Odah, and the founder of the Kuwaiti Family Committee, a group established in 2004 to heighten global awareness of the prisoners in Guantanamo Bay. Over the past five years, Khalid has waged legal, media, and public relations campaigns to promote the need for due process for the prisoners at Guantanamo. In 2004, Khalid brought his son's case to the Supreme Court Rasul v. Bush/ al-Odah v. Bush.

Khalid is a retired lieutenant colonel in the Kuwait Air Force and has five children. He is committed to seeking justice for his son and other detainees. Khalid lives in Kuwait City, Kuwait.

Al Odah commented on a poll on American's attitudes towards the Guantanamo detainees. The poll found that:

- Nearly 60 percent of the Americans surveyed, "...believe the prisoners being held in Guantanamo Bay should either be granted a hearing before an independent judge or be released to their home countries."
- 52 percent of the Americans surveyed, "...believe the Military Commissions Act, a new law created in October that denies "enemy combatants" the right to challenge their imprisonment in front of an independent judge, is unfair."
- Less than 20 percent of the Americans surveyed, "...believe that the detainees should be held indefinitely."

Al Odah said:

"I am heartened that so many Americans agree that my son and others in Guantanamo Bay deserve a hearing before an independent judge,"

Al Otah's son received a habeas corpus hearing before a federal judge, who ruled on August 24, 2009 that he was detained legally.

On October 28, 2011, CNN reporter Jenifer Fenton visited Khalid al-Odah's house, where she met and interviewed several former Guantanamo captives, including Fouad al Rabiah and Abd Al Aziz Sayer Uwain Al Shammeri. Fenton reported that former captives routinely met at al Odah's house for moral support.
