= George Brent Mickum IV =

American lawyer

George Brent Mickum IV is an American lawyer and currently the General Counsel of ERP Compliant Fuels, LLC. Mickum represented three British residents, Bisher Al Rawi, Jamil El Banna, and Martin Mubanga in El Banna v. Bush. The three were captured in Africa, held first in CIA custody, then transported to the Guantanamo Bay detention camps, in Cuba.

Before entering private practice, Mickum worked as a trial attorney for the Federal Trade Commission. He also worked as a special assistant U.S. Attorney for the Department of Justice and as the senior investigative counsel for the Senate Special Committee on Investigations.

When the United States Supreme Court forced the Department of Defense to provide an opportunity for captives to learn why they were being held, they designed administrative procedures called "Combatant Status Review Tribunals". The Guardian quoted Mickum's advice to his clients that they decline to participate:

Findings from the CSRT would be used against my clients at trial. They are backdoor trials. The personal representative is an agent of the government who can be compelled to testify against you at the tribunal and at any subsequent trial.

In February 2008 Mickum was one of the first two lawyers to see Abu Zubaydah, one of the three captives the CIA acknowledges waterboarding, when he was in one of their black sites." All the attorneys who are allowed to meet with the Guantanamo captives had to agree not to disclose "secret" information they learn from their clients. However the CIA argued this agreement wasn't sufficient for those attorneys who wanted to meet with their former clients, because the clients could reveal information that was "top secret". Mickum said: "The hypocrisy that we cannot discuss Zubaydah's treatment, but the government can admit to waterboarding him and claim that it is legal is rather astounding."
