= Uwain =

Uwain may refer to:

- Abd Al Aziz Sayer Uwain Al Shammeri (born 1973), one of the Kuwaiti detainees at Guantanamo Bay
- Sir Uwain, a Knight of the Round Table in Arthurian legend
