= Majah Ha Adrif =

Afghan militia leader

Majah Ha Adrif was an Afghan militia leader.

The testimony of an Afghan Police officer, appointed by officials of Hamid Karzai's government, named Swar Khan, offered several details of Maja Ha Adrif's career during Hamid Karzai's government.

== Role in the appointment of Hamid Karzai of Afghanistan's interim leader ==
In November 2001 a multiparty agreement, in Bonn, Germany, lead to the appointment of Hamid Karzai as leader of the Afghan Transitional Administration. The parties in Bonn included several of Afghanistan's militia leaders, commonly called "warlords".

According to Swan Khan, Majah Ha Adrif was one of the Bonn attendees. Swar Khan testified Majah Ha Adrif had a picture of himself shaking hands with US President George W. Bush.

== Chief of Afghan Intelligence for Khost ==
Swar Khan worked for a former anti-Taliban militia leader named Malem Jan Sorbari. He attributed his denunciation, and transportation to Guantanamo to bad blood triggered by a rivalry between the former militia leaders he worked under and Majah Ha Adrif. According to Swar Khan his immediate boss, Mustafa, had been appointed the Police Chief of Khost, while a different authority had appointed Majah Ha Adrif in charge of Afghan intelligence in Khost. Swar Khan told his Combatant Status Review Tribunal that Mustafa's forces fought with Majah Ha Adrif's forces over who had jurisdiction over the security of the areas surrounding the US bases in Khost. Many innocent people were killed during this fighting.

Swar Khan said one of Majah Ha Adrif's subordinates, named Habib Noor, falsely denounced him, and triggered his capture by the American, due to the animosity arising from the jurisdictional dispute.

== Death ==
According to Swar Khan, Majah Ha Adrif was shot at an American roadblock:

"Maja Han Adroft(ph) [sic] was very trusted by the Americans. He went with the Americans to the German city of Bonn, to a meeting. He has a picture with Bush and shook hands with Bush. In a checkpoint, he probably took money from someone. But, the Americans shot him and killed him.
