= Ahsanullah =

Ahsanullah may refer to:

- Ahsanullah (cricketer) (born 1997), Afghan cricketer
- Ahsanullah (educator) (1873–1965), Indian Islamic theologist and social reformer
- Ahsanullah Master (1950–2004) Bangladeshi politician
- Ahsanullah Montu (1962–2018), Bangladeshi footballer and coach
- Ahsanullah Pirzai, Guantanamo Bay detainee
- Khwaja Ahsanullah (1846–1901), third Nawab of Dhaka
- Shamsunnahar Khwaja Ahsanullah (1934–2025), Bangladeshi politician
- Ahsanullah University of Science and Technology, a private university in Dhaka, Bangladesh
- Ahsanullah Engineering College, former name of Bangladesh University of Engineering and Technology, Dhaka
