= Failaka Island attack =

2002 terrorist incident in Kuwait

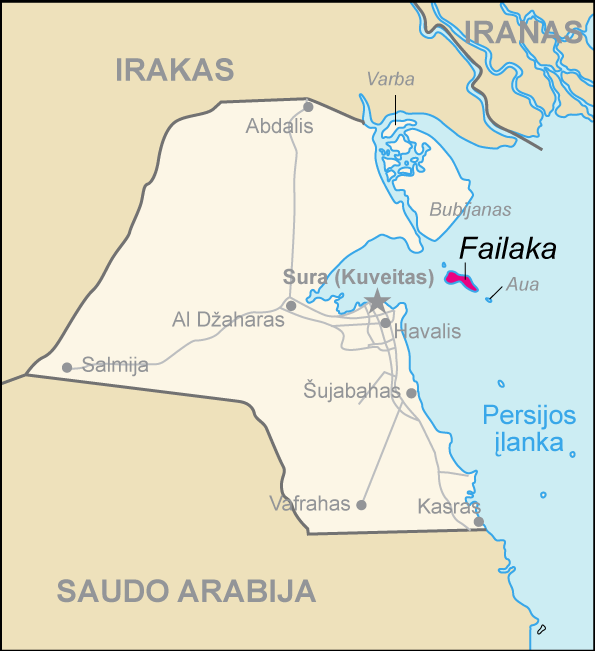
- A Lithuanian map of Failaka Island with it highlighted, in relation to mainland Kuwait and neighboring countries.
- Location: 29.453°N 48.336°E; Failaka Island, Kuwait
- Date: October 8, 2002; 11:00 a.m. (UTC+03:00)
- Target: U.S. Marines on a training exercise
- Attack type: Motorized small arms assault
- Weapons: Kalashnikov rifles, pickup truck
- Deaths: 3 (including two attackers)
- Injuries: 1 U.S. marine wounded (WIA)
- Victim: 1 U.S. marine killed †
- Perpetrators: Anas Al Kandari and Jassem al-Hajiri †
- Assailant: 2 armed gunmen
- Motive: Jihadism and anti-Americanism

Failaka Island, Persian Gulf

The Failaka Island attack took place on October 8, 2002, when two Kuwaiti citizens with ties to al-Qaeda jihadists in Afghanistan attacked a group of unarmed United States Marines conducting a training exercise on a Kuwaiti island, killing one before being killed themselves. The attackers were reported to have served as volunteers with the Taliban in Afghanistan, prior to the U.S. invasion of that country in response to the September 11 attacks of 2001.

The Marines were on a training exercise on Failaka Island, an island off the coast of Kuwait. One U.S. Marine was killed and another was seriously injured. The two Kuwaiti attackers were killed after Marines returned fire in self-defense. The marines' rifles were loaded with blank rounds for the training exercise, but they were able to engage their Kuwaiti attackers with their pistols.

== Background ==
In October 2002, an element of approximately 150 U.S. marines from India Company and Lima Company of Battalion Landing Team, 3rd Battalion, 1st Marine Regiment, 11th Marine Expeditionary Unit were on Failaka Island as part of Eager Mace, a joint annual U.S. and Kuwaiti military amphibious assault training exercise. Eager Mace had begun the previous month and had 2,000 U.S. marines participating in it in total. For the part of the exercise that took place on Failaka Island, it was conducted by U.S. forces only.

Failaka Island was a small island belonging to Kuwait, located in the Kuwait Bay off the eastern coastline of mainland Kuwait proper. Prior to the Persian Gulf War of 1991 the island was a resort, but in 2002 the war damage had not been repaired. During the Gulf War, forces of the Iraqi Army invaded and occupied the island, severely damaging it in the process. More than 11 years later, a much of the damage had not been repaired and some buildings still had graffiti painted on them from the war.

The marines on Failaka had left southern California's Camp Pendleton in June 2002 and had arrived in Kuwait aboard the naval warship USS Denver after making port calls in several foreign countries. In addition to the usual training duties that were part of the scheduled exercise, the marines were also practicing for a possible U.S. invasion of Iraq amid United Nations deliberations over the Iraqi regime's alleged chemical weapons program.

There was a small civilian caretaker presence on the island consisting of Kuwaiti citizens, as well as a few shop owners, which surprised the marines as they were under the impression that the island was deserted. Nevertheless, the marines felt safe on the island as Kuwait was allied with the U.S and the Kuwaiti government told them that it was safe. There was a small contingent of Kuwaiti police there as well. In addition, the Kuwaiti civilians with whom the marines interacted were friendly and seemed glad to have U.S. military forces in their country.

== Attack ==
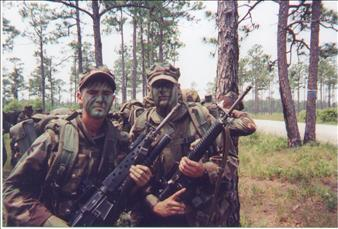
Antonio J. "Tony" Sledd (left), the sole U.S. marine killed in the attack.

On October 7, two Kuwaiti men, Anas al-Kandari and Jassem al-Hajiri, sat in a small white-with-red stripes Nissan pickup truck that they had rented and reconnoitered the marines training from a distance. They had spent some time at a local mosque a few days before and had reconnoitered the marines the day prior as well.

The two men were jihadis who had received terrorist training in Afghanistan. They had arrived at the island via ferry at 10:30 a.m. and had been to the island a few times before, where they played soccer and drank soft drinks. Al-Kandari had fasted and prayed before going to the island in October, writing a will in which he demanded that his possessions be given to his fellow jihadis. He recorded a "martyrdom video" at a mosque before going to the island, where he recited some verses from the Quran and gave an oration to the camera urging Muslims to be more devout in Islam and to fight infidels, and lambasted the U.S. for its alleged atrocities against Muslims. Al-Hajiri was al-Kandari's cousin and a 26-year-old man who worked for the Kuwaiti Ministry of Oil.

The following day, October 8, was a hot and sunny day on the island. At approximately, 11:00 a.m., some marines were taking a break and resting at a beach-side campsite during a lull in the training. They did not have live ammunition in their rifles for training purposes, although a few commissioned officers and senior NCOs carried Beretta M9 sidearms with live ammunition. Soon thereafter, the two gunmen began shooting at the marines with Kalashnikov rifles, specifically targeting two marines playing a makeshift game of baseball during a rest in the training. One nearby marine at first thought the gunfire was from his fellow marines, but soon realized otherwise.

The marines were caught off guard. The gunfire struck the two baseball-playing marines, as well as a tent and dozens of cases of soft drinks. The men then drove to another location and then shot again. A marine sentry, Corporal James Cottrell, returned fire with the only M16A2 rifle on the beach with live ammunition. He disabled the truck and critically wounded the driver and his passenger allowing company commander Captain Matthew S. Reid the chance to return fire with his sidearm. The two Kuwaiti gunmen were shot, with one of them exiting the vehicle on the passenger side with several gunshot wounds. Reid and the senior-most enlisted marine on the island, First Sergeant Timothy Ruff, and Company Gunnery Sergeant Wayne A. Hertz then closed with and shot the gunman several more times, killing him. Ruff and other marines, including Hertz, then extracted the wounded driver from the vehicle. That gunman also died. Before the second gunman died, the marines walked up to his body and stood over him. Surrounded by U.S. marines, the mortally-wounded gunman laid dying on the ground and muttered a few phrases in Arabic before dying.

Radio operator Lance Corporal George R. Simpson, Jr., a 21-year-old Ohioan from Dayton, was shot in the arm and Lance Corporal Antonio J. "Tony" Sledd, a 20-year-old Floridian, was shot in the chin and abdomen. An avid baseball fan from Florida's Hillsborough County, Sledd was playing an impromptu baseball game with Lance Corporal Simpson when the former was shot by one of the black-bearded gunmen at point-blank range in the back.

Naval corpsmen assessed the injured marines and came to the conclusion that they needed more care and thus a request was put in to the U.S. Army hospital at Camp Doha for a medical evacuation. Within ten minutes, a U.S. Army UH-60 medical helicopter arrived and flew the two wounded marines to the mainland for treatment at an army hospital in Kuwait City. Sledd was reportedly in good spirits when he was taken away by the helicopter, but he died during surgery the same day. Simpson survived his wounds and was awarded the Purple Heart medal later that month by a general.

After al-Kandari and al-Haijiri were killed by the marines, reports indicate that the marines then took incoming gunfire from a nearby fishing village, with some of them jumping into the water to avoid being shot, as cover was scarce on a sandy beach. A CH-47 helicopter arrived and distributed ammunition to the marines, who then went into the town to fight the village-based attackers. Eight hours later, the marines concluded and left.

== Aftermath ==
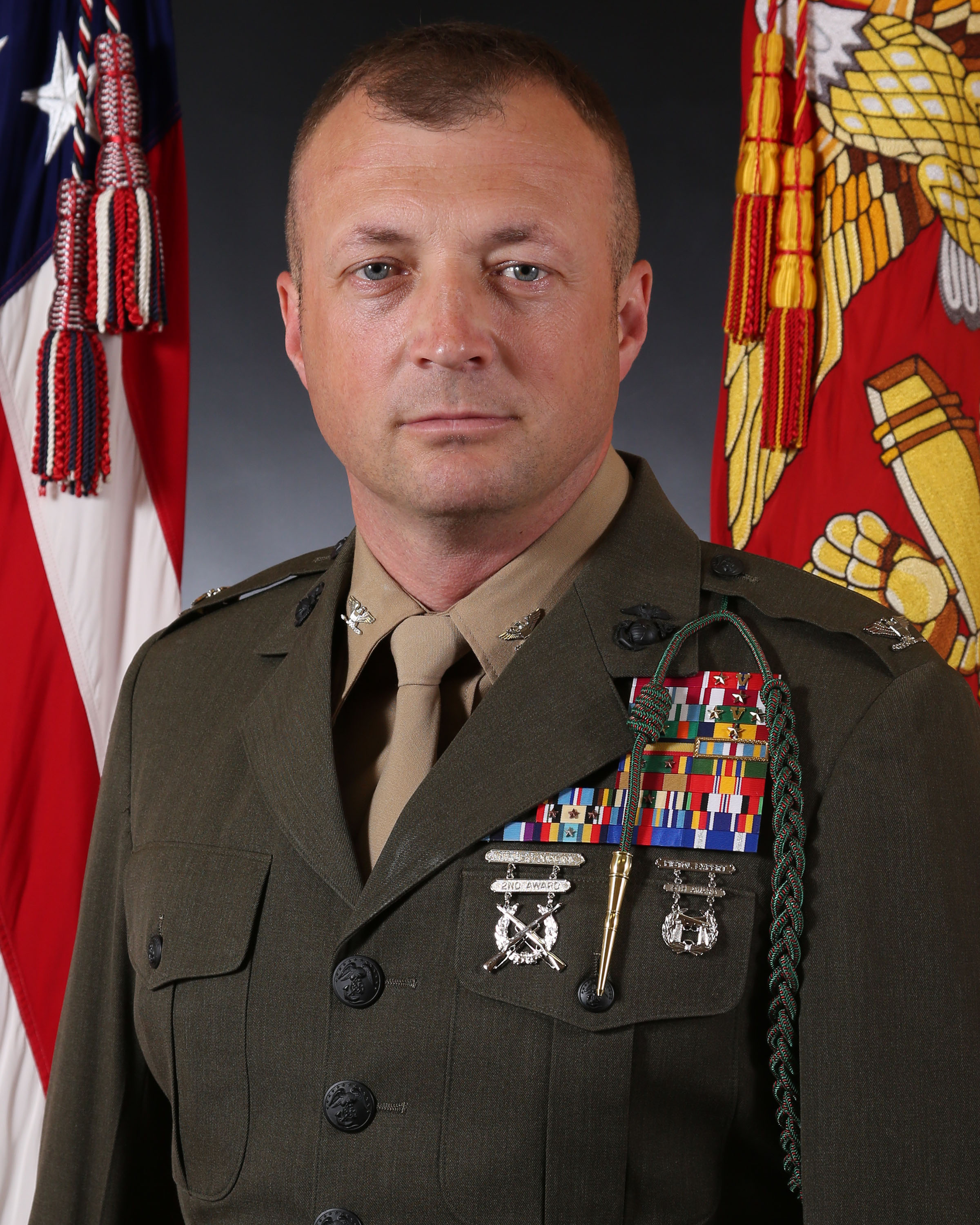
Matthew S. Reid, one of the U.S. marines present during the attack, pictured here in the mid-2010s as a colonel.

After killing the two attacking gunmen, the marines were unsure if there were any more attackers as there was still incoming gunfire. Once gunfire ceased the marines were unable to find the shooter. The marines of Lima Company set up a defensive posture, requested more ammunition, searched nearby buildings, stopped civilian vehicles, locked down the area, and detained 31 civilians for investigation, including two medical students suspected of being linked to gunman al-Kandari, handing them over to Kuwaiti authorities for further investigation. An unmanned aerial vehicle (UAV) was dispatched over the island along with British air force Tornadoes and U.S. Air Force F-16s.

The exercise the marines were a part of, Eager Mace, was originally intended to last three weeks, but was cancelled after the attack.

Though the Iraq War itself would not begin until a few months later in March of the following year, Sledd is considered by some to be the first U.S. combat casualty of the war, as he was killed by hostile fire while training for its commencement. His death became a rallying cry for some marines who knew him, who said, "Remember how and why Sledd died!" Sledd was posthumously advanced to the rate of corporal. Eight days after the attack, the U.S. government passed the Authorization for Use of Military Force Against Iraq, which legally cleared the way for the U.S. to invade Iraq, which it did in March the following year.

George R. Simpson, one of the marines injured in the attack, left the U.S. Marine Corps in 2004. According to his mother, he had two titanium plates installed into his injured arm and with more than twenty-five screws holding the affected area together.

In mid-2015, one of the suspects connected with the attack was killed by the U.S. government, using a UAV airstrike.

=== Guantanamo captives alleged to have an association with the Failaka Island attack ===
A number of the captives held in extrajudicial detention in Guantanamo had their continued detention justified, in part, through a friendship or family relationship with the two attackers.

Guantanamo captives alleged to have an association with the Failaka Island attack
ISN	Name	Nationality	Alleged association
196	Musa Bin Ali Bin Said al Amri	Saudi Arabian	One of detainee's aliases was in another hard drive believed to belong to members of the suspected al-Qaeda cell involved with the October 2002 attack on U.S. marines in Failaka Island.; The detainee's name was listed on a computer seized from members of the suspected al Qaida cell involved in the October 2002 attack on United States marines on Failaka Island.
226	Anwar al Nurr	Saudi Arabian	The detainee's name and other information was found in a September 2, 2002, "chat session" found on the hard drive of a computer confiscated from members of the suspected al Qaida cell involved in the October 2002 attack on U.S. marines on Failaka Island.; The detainee's name was discovered as part of information that was recovered from hard drives, which were seized from the suspected al-Qaeda cell that attacked the United States marines on Failaka Island in October 2002.
234	Khalid Mohammed al Zaharni	Saudi Arabian	The detainee's name was found under a chat session on a computer hard drive seized from the suspected al-Qaeda cell that attacked the U.S. marines on Failaka Island in October 2002.
568	Adil Zamil Abdull Mohssin Al Zamil	Kuwaiti	The detainee was invited to the house of a man involved in the October 2002 attack on U.S. Marines on Failaka Island, Kuwait.
