= Abdullah Kamel Abdullah Kamel Al Kandari =

Guantanamo detainee known to have been released

- Born: 17 September 1973 (age 53); Hawalli, Kuwait
- Detained at: Guantanamo
- Other names: Abdullah Kamal Abdullah Kamal al Kandari; Abdulla Kamel al Kandari
- ISN: 228
- Charge(s): no charge, held in extrajudicial detention
- Status: repatriated
- Occupation: Electrical engineer

Abdullah Kamel Abdullah Kamel Al Kandari (born 17 September 1973) is a citizen of Kuwait, who was held in extrajudicial detention in the United States Guantanamo Bay detention camps, in Cuba.

== Press reports ==
On 12 July 2006, the magazine Mother Jones provided excerpts from the transcripts of a selection of the Guantanamo detainees. The article informed readers:

More than a dozen detainees were cited for owning cheap digital watches, particularly "the infamous Casio watch of the type used by Al Qaeda members for bomb detonators."

The article quoted Al Kandari, and three other watch owners:

When they told me that Casios were used by Al Qaeda and the watch was for explosives, I was shocked... If I had known that, I would have thrown it away. I'm not stupid. We have four chaplains [at Guantanamo]; all of them wear this watch.

One of Abdullah Kamel's lawyers, Kristine A. Huskey told Newsday that:

...the factors supporting release didn't mention numerous affidavits submitted from relatives and teammates insisting the prisoner had never shown any zealous or anti-American behavior.

== Meetings with attorneys ==
According to an article in Marie Claire magazine, Kristine A. Huskey was one of Abdullah Kamel's attorneys. Huskey described her surprise upon first meeting with Guantanamo clients, like Abdullah Kamel, that they preferred food brought from Guantanamo fast food outlets to the Arabic delicacies she and her colleagues had brought from the Continental US. Abdullah Kamel's favorite was a cheese pizza from the base's Pizza Hut.

== Al Odah v. United States ==
Abdullah Kamel Abdullah Kamel Al Kandari was among the eleven captives covered in the July 2008 "Petitioners' Status Report" filed by David J. Cynamon in Al Odah v. United States on behalf of the four remaining Kuwaiti prisoners in Guantanamo. Seven other prisoners were amalgamated to the case, which charged that none of the men had been cleared for release, even though the government had completed factual returns for them—and those factual returns had contained redacted sections.

The decision, striking down the Military Commissions Act, was handed down on June 12, 2008.

== Repatriation ==
The Washington Post reported, on 10 September 2006, that Al Kandari would be returned to Kuwait soon. The Emir of Kuwait personally requested Al Kandari's release, and that of another Kuwaiti man named Omar Rajab Amin.

== Acquittal confirmed ==
On 29 May 2007, the Miami Herald reported that a Kuwaiti appeals court had upheld the acquittals of Al Kandari and Omar Rajab Amin.

== The McClatchy interview ==
On 15 June 2008 the McClatchy News Service published articles based on interviews with 66 former Guantanamo captives. McClatchy reporters interviewed Abdulla Kamel al Kandari. The McClatchy report said that Thomas Wilner, his lawyer, went to the secure facility, to review the classified evidence that prompted the additional allegations on the Summary of Evidence memos prepared for his Administrative Review Board hearings. Lawyers for the captives have to go through a security clearance first. And there was one location they could travel to review classified evidence.

The report said that Wilner found no evidence in the classified dossier to back up the new allegations.

== See also ==
- Al-Kandari
