= Abdallah al-Ajmi =

Kuwaiti Guantanamo Bay prisoner (1978–2008)

Abdallah Saleh Ali Al Ajmi
- Born: 2 August 1978; Almadi, Kuwait
- Died: 23 March 2008 (aged 29); Mosul, Iraq
- Detained at: Guantanamo
- ISN: 220
- Charge(s): no charge, held in extrajudicial detention
- Status: Dead, following suicide bombing

Abdallah Saleh Ali Al Ajmi (2 August 1978 – 23 March 2008) was a Kuwaiti citizen, who was held in extrajudicial detention in the United States Guantanamo Bay detainment camps, in Cuba. His Guantanamo Internment Serial Number was 220. Joint Task Force Guantanamo counter-terrorism analysts reports indicated that he was born on 2 August 1978, in Almadi, Kuwait.

On 2 September 2003, attorneys Thomas Wilner, Neil H. Koslowe, Kristine A. Huskey, and Heather Lamberg Kafele filed a Petition for writ of Certiorari on behalf of Al Ajmi and eleven other Guantanamo detainees.

In March or April 2008, Al Ajmi conducted a suicide attack in Iraq.

== Combatant Status Review ==
A Summary of Evidence memo was prepared for his tribunal. The memo accused him of the following:

a. The detainee is a Taliban fighter:
1. The detainee went AWOL from the Kuwaiti military in order to travel to Afghanistan to participate in the Jihad.
2. The detainee was issued an AK-47, ammunition and hand grenades by the Taliban.

b. The detainee participated in military operations against the coalition.
1. The detainee admitted he was in Afghanistan fighting with the Taliban in the Bagram area.
2. The detainee was placed in a defensive position by the Taliban in order to block the Northern Alliance.
3. The detainee admitted spending eight months on the front line at the Aiubi Center, AF.
4. The detainee admitted engaging in two or three fire fights with the Northern Alliance.
5. The detainee retreated to the Tora Bora region of AF and was later captured as he attempted to escape to Pakistan.

== Abdullah Saleh Ali Al Ajmi v. United States of America ==
A writ of habeas corpus, Abdullah Saleh Ali Al Ajmi v. United States of America, was submitted on Abdullah Saleh Ali Al Ajmi's behalf.

In response, on 15 September 2004, the Department of Defense released 12 pages of unclassified documents related to his Combatant Status Review Tribunal.

Al Ajmi's "enemy combatant" status was confirmed by Tribunal panel 2 on 2 August 2004 — making his own of the first cases to be confirmed.

=== Detainee election form ===
Al Ajmi's Personal Representative's Detainee election form stated that they met for twenty minutes, and recorded in its notes section:

Detainee acknowledged reading Tribunal notice. He declined further comment.

== Earned mention in the "No-hearing hearings" study ==
According to the study entitled, No-hearing hearings, Al Ajmi was the first captive to have his Tribunal convened. His Tribunal was convened on 2 August 2004.

The study notes:

For that first hearing, the personal representative met with the detainee on July 31, 2004, two days after the CSRT procedures were promulgated. This was the only meeting between this detainee and his personal representative and it lasted only 10 minutes, including translation time. On Monday, August 2, 2004, two days after the meeting between the personal representative and the detainee, the CSRT Tribunal was empanelled, the hearing held, the classified evidence evaluated and the decision issued. This detainee did not participate in his CSRT

hearing.

=== Administrative Review Board ===
Detainees whose Combatant Status Review Tribunal labeled them "enemy combatants" were scheduled for annual Administrative Review Board hearings. These hearings were designed to assess the threat a detainee might pose if released or transferred, and whether there were other factors that warranted his continued detention.

=== Summary of Evidence memo ===
A Summary of Evidence memo was prepared for Abdallah Salih Ali Al Ajmi's Administrative Review Board, on 4 February 2005. The memo listed eleven "primary factors favor[ing] continued detention".

The following primary factors favor continued detention

A. Al Ajmi is a Taliban fighter:
1. Al Ajmi went AWOL from the Kuwaiti military in order to travel to Afghanistan participate in the Jihad.
2. Al Ajmi was issued an AK-47, ammunition and hand grenades by the Taliban.

B. Al Ajmi participated in military operations against the coalition.
1. Al Ajmi admitted he was in Afghanistan fighting with the Taliban in the Bagram area.
2. Al Ajmi was placed in a defensive position by the Taliban in order to block the Northern Alliance.
3. Al Ajmi admitted spending eight months on the front line at the Aiubi Center, Afghanistan.
4. Al Ajmi admitted engaging in two or three fire fights with the Northern Alliance.
5. Al Ajmi retreated to the Tora Bora region of Afghanistan and was later captured as he attempted to escape to Pakistan.

C. Al Ajmi is committed to jihad.
1. Al Ajmi went AWOL because he wanted to participate in the jihad in Afghanistan but could not get leave from the military.
2. In Aug 2004, Al Ajmi wanted to make sure that when the case goes before the Tribunal, they know that he now is a Jihadist, an enemy combatant, and that he will kill as many Americans as he possibly can.

D. Upon arrival at GTMO, Al Ajmi has been constantly in trouble. Al Ajmi's overall behavior has been aggressive and non-compliant, and he has resided in GTMO's disciplinary blocks throughout his detention.

E. Based upon a review of recommendations from U.S. agencies and classified and unclassified documents, Al Ajmi is regarded as a continued threat to the United States and its Allies.

The following primary factors favor release or transfer

No information available.

=== Transcript ===
Al Ajmi's Board hearing convened on 4 February 2005. In the Spring of 2006, in response to a court order from Jed Rakoff the Department of Defense published a twenty-five page summarized transcript from his Administrative Review Board hearing.

=== Board recommendations ===
In early September 2007, the Department of Defense released two heavily redacted memos, from his Board, to Gordon R. England, the Designated Civilian Official. The Board's recommendation was unanimous. The Board's recommendation was redacted. England authorized his transfer on 20 May 2005.

== Repatriation and acquittal ==
Al Ajmi was repatriated to Kuwait and taken into Kuwaiti custody on 3 November 2005. Al Ajmi was freed, on bail, while he awaited trial. The five men trial began in March 2006, and were acquitted on 22 July 2006. The Washington Post reported that the two main charges were that the detainees had helped fund Al Wafa, an Afghan charity with ties to al-Qaeda, and that they had fought alongside the Taliban. Further, the prosecution argued that the detainees actions had endangered Kuwait's political standing and its relations with friendly nations.

The detainees' defense had argued that testimony secured in Guantanamo could not be used in Kuwaiti courts, because the detainees and interrogators had not signed them. Furthermore, they had argued that the allegations the USA had directed at them were not violations of Kuwaiti law.

In an October 2011 article about the torture of other former captives from Kuwait, CNN's Jenifer Fenton reported that people who knew him "described him as unstable when he returned from Guantanamo."

== Suicide bombing after release ==
On 1 May 2008, Al Ajmi's cousin told Al Arabiya television that Al Ajmi had carried out a suicide bombing in Mosul, Iraq. On 2 May 2008, The International Herald Tribune reported that the three most recent suicide bombings in Mosul occurred on 26 April 2008, and killed seven people. According to the report, Al Ajmi's cousin said that Al Ajmi had disappeared "two weeks ago". However, a 2009 The Washington Post article reported that Al Ajmi killed himself in a suicide bombing on 23 March 2008, which killed 13 Iraqi policemen. A CNN report from October 2011 said the attack "...left six people dead, including two police officers.".

== Defense Intelligence Agency claims he "returned to terrorism" ==
The Defense Intelligence Agency asserted Abdallah Salih al-Ajmi had "returned to terrorism".

The DIA reported:

Abdallah Salih al-Ajmi: Was transferred to Kuwait in 2005 and subsequently conducted a suicide bombing attack in Mosul, Iraq in April 2008. Three suicide bombers struck in Mosul on April 26, 2008, killing 7 people. Al-Ajmi had returned to Kuwait following his release from Guantanamo Bay and traveled to Iraq via Syria. He was apparently living a productive life in Kuwait prior to his traveling to Iraq to be a suicide bomber. It is unknown what motivated him to leave Kuwait and go to Iraq. His family members were reportedly shocked to hear he had conducted a suicide bombing.

== See also ==
- Adel Zamel Abdul-Mohsen
- Saad Madhi al-Azmi
