= Barry Wingard =

American lawyer

- Born: December 14, 1966 (age 59)
- Occupations: Lawyer, military officer
- Known for: Defended captives before Guantanamo military commissions

Barry Wingard (born December 14, 1966) is an American lawyer and retired lieutenant colonel in the United States Air National Guard.

== Military career ==
Wingard's original military service was an enlisted soldier in the United States Army. Wingard is an Iraq War Veteran. He served fifteen years in the United States Army, prior to earning a Juris Doctor degree and joining the United States Air Force.

== Legal career ==
In civilian life Wingard is a public defender in Allegheny County Pittsburgh.

Wingard is a military lawyer in the United States Air Force Judge Advocate General's Corps and serves with the Pennsylvania Air National Guard.

Lieutenant Colonel Wingard served as one of the attorneys for Kuwaiti detainee in Guantanamo Fayiz Al Kandari who was charged before a Guantanamo military commission in 2008.

The Pittsburgh Post-Gazette described Wingard and Darrel Vandeveld as "...among a handful of military attorneys who have chosen to risk their careers by publicly voicing criticisms of the Military Commissions, which face an uncertain future."

On September 30, 2012, Lillian Thomas, writing in the Pittsburgh Post-Gazette, wrote that, paradoxically, when the Office of Military Commissions suddenly dropped all charges against Faiz al Kandari, it made it more difficult for Wingard to work on his behalf.

Col. Wingard, 45, long maintained that the charges against his client -- material support of terrorism and conspiracy -- were based on flimsy, third-hand evidence. But now that they have been dropped, his client's situation is worse, since there is now no real hope of a judicial proceeding, and his ability to advocate for Mr. al-Kandari is reduced.

Thomas pointed out that Wingard could no longer travel to Kuwait to seek exculpatory evidence, he would no longer be provided with government translators. Guantanamo authorities have arbitrarily cancelled visits to Guantanamo for client-attorney interviews, and his correspondence with his client is no longer protected from censors' scrutiny.
