= El Banna v. Bush =

- Court: United States District Court for the District of Columbia
- Full case name: Jamil El Banna, et al. v. George W. Bush, et al.
- Docket nos.: 1:04-cv-01144
- Citation: 2005 U.S. Dist. LEXIS 16880 (2005)

Case history
- Related actions: Boumediene v. Bush, 553 U.S. 723 (2008)

Court membership
- Judge sitting: Richard W. Roberts

El Banna v. Bush, No. 1:04-cv-01144, is a writ of habeas corpus that was submitted on behalf of the Guantanamo captives Jamil al-Banna, Bisher Al Rawi and Martin Mubanga. They were United Kingdom citizens or residents.

George Brent Mickum was the lead counsel in this petition.

In 2005, the defendants asked the United States District Court preserve records of the detainees' treatment.

Cases amalgamated with El Banna v. Bush
ISN	Name	Notes
905	Jamil El-Banna	Lead petitioner in the case.; Not "captured on the battlefield". Apprehended in Gambia, while on a business trip with his friend Bisher Al-Rawi.; Was first held and interrogated in a CIA safe house in Gambia—not in the detention of the Gambian justice system.; Returned to Britain in 2007.
906	Bisher Al-Rawi	Not "captured on the battlefield". Apprehended in Gambia, while on a business trip with his friend Jamil el-Banna.; Was first held and interrogated in a CIA safe house in Gambia—not in the detention of the Gambian justice system.; Original arrest was nominally due to carrying a battery charger in his luggage.; Pressure for the United Kingdom to insist on his return mounted when it became public that he was an MI-5 informant who was betrayed by his MI-5 handlers.
10007	Martin Mubanga	A joint citizen of Zambia and the United Kingdom.; Captured in Zambia, not "captured on the battlefield".

== Eligible to seek relief ==
On 3 July 2008, US District Court Judge Thomas F. Hogan listed this habeas petition on a list where former captives were eligible to seek relief.
