= Saad Madhi Saad Howash Al Azmi =

Kuwaiti detainee

Saad Madi Saad al Azmi
- Born: May 29, 1979 (age 47); Doha, Kuwait
- Detained at: Bagram, Guantanamo
- Other names: Saad Madhi Saad Howash Al Azmi; Saad Madai Saad Ha Wash Al-Azmi; Saad Madi Saad Al Azmi
- ISN: 571
- Status: Repatriated

Saad Madi Saad al Azmi (born May 29, 1979) is a Kuwaiti citizen. He was held in extrajudicial detention in the United States Guantánamo Bay detainment camps, in Cuba, and later repatriated on November 4, 2005. Joint Task Force Guantanamo counter-terrorism analysts report that al-Azmi was born on May 29, 1979, in Doha, Kuwait.

== Repatriation ==
Al-Azmi and four other men were repatriated on November 4, 2005. The five stood trial in a Kuwaiti court, and were acquitted.

The Associated Press reported that the two main charges were that the detainees had helped fund Al Wafa, an Afghan charity with ties to al-Qaeda, and that they had fought alongside the Taliban. Further, the prosecution argued that the detainees actions had endangered Kuwait's political standing and its relations with friendly nations.

The detainees' defense had argued that testimony secured in Guantanamo could not be used in Kuwaiti courts, because the detainees and interrogators hadn't signed them. Further, they had argued, the allegations the USA had directed at them weren't violations of Kuwaiti law.

== McClatchy interview ==
On June 15, 2008, the McClatchy News Service published articles based on interviews with 66 former Guantanamo captives. McClatchy reporters interviewed Saad Madi al Azmi.

McClatchy reported remarked that the account of himself he told was at odds with that he offered during his CSR Tribunal. He told McClatchy reporters that he had never been to Afghanistan, and that he was captured in his hotel room in Pakistan by Pakistani police in August 2001. He said he was captured with Adel al Zamel, who the McClatchy reporters noted was captured in Peshawar in January 2002. He said he had traveled to Pakistan to import honey.

When he was arrested his visa had expired. He thought he would soon be released over what was a minor indiscretion, but a Pakistani police officer demanded a bribe first, which he declined, resulting in a longer detention, which, unfortunately, overlapped al Qaeda's attacks on September 11, 2001, making it economically worthwhile for the Pakistani police to turn him over the Americans.

Al Azmi told reporters he was beaten in both Kandahar detention facility and the Bagram Theater Internment Facility.

== See also ==
- Abdul-Aziz al-Shimmiri
- Adel Zamel Abdul-Mohsen
- Abdallah Saleh Ali Al Ajmi
- Mohammed Fnaitil al-Dehani
