= Mosa Zi Zemmori =

Belgian citizen (born 1978)

- Born: 3 July 1978 (age 48); Wilrijk, Belgium
- Citizenship: Belgian
- Detained at: Guantanamo
- ISN: 270
- Charge: No charge (held in extrajudicial detention)
- Status: Repatriated

Mosa Zi Zemmori is a Belgian citizen who was held in extrajudicial detention in the United States Guantanamo Bay detainment camps, in Cuba. His Guantanamo detainee ID number was 270. According to the US Department of Defense, he was born on 3 July 1978, in Wilrijk, Belgium. He was repatriated to Belgium on 25 April 2005. When he was arrested he was characterized as a Moroccan, or a Belgian from Morocco, although the DoD says he was born in Belgium.

== Life ==
Press reports routinely assert Zemmori was detained while in Kandahar, in the south of Afghanistan. But the official DoD allegations against Zemmori acknowledge he was detained in Pakistan, after turning himself in to Pakistani officials. Those documents say he was transferred to a detention facility in Kandahar.

== Administrative Review Board ==
Detainees whose Combatant Status Review Tribunal labeled them "enemy combatants" were scheduled for annual Administrative Review Board hearings. These hearings were designed to assess the threat a detainee might pose if released or transferred, and whether there were other factors that warranted his continued detention.

== Repatriation ==
Zemmori was repatriated to Belgium on 25 April 2005, along with Mesut Sen. Reuters reports he was held, for a time, by Belgian authorities.

== July 2015 arrest ==
Police in Belgium reported that in July 2015, five men were arrested accused of conspiracy in an armed robbery that was intended to raise funds to support recruitment of fighters in Syria, the five included Zemmori and a second former Guantanamo prisoner. The arrests occurred on 22 July 2015 but were not reported in the English-speaking press until 24 July. The Guardian and Reuters both described Zemmori as a "37-year-old Belgian of Moroccan origin". CNN described him as "a Moroccan national born in Antwerp.".

In May 2009, Zemmori and the other former Guantanamo prisoner were both cleared of the criminal conspiracy charges.

== Open letter to President Biden ==
On 29 January 2021 the New York Review of Books published an open letter from Zemmori, and six other individuals who were formerly held in Guantanamo, to newly inaugurated President Biden, appealing to him to close the detention camp.

== See also ==
- Seton Hall reports
