= Nasir Maziyad Abdallah Al Qurayshi Al Subii =

Saudi Arabian Guantanamo detainee (born 1983)

- Born: 1983 (age 42–43); Al Arib, Saudi Arabia
- Detained at: Guantanamo
- ISN: 497
- Charge(s): no charge, held in extrajudicial detention
- Status: repatriated

Nasir Maziyad Abdallah Al Qurayshi Al Subii is a citizen of Saudi Arabia who was held in extrajudicial detention in the United States Guantanamo Bay detention camps, in Cuba. His Guantanamo Internment Serial Number was 497. American counter-terror analysts estimate he was born in 1983, in Al Arib, Saudi Arabia.

== Identity ==
The official documents from the US Department of Defense, and from the Royal Embassy of Saudi Arabia, Washington DC transliterate Al Subii's name differently:

- His name was transliterated as Nasir Maziyad Abdallah Al Qurayshi Al Subii on the official lists of names released by the US Department of Defense.
- His name was transliterated as Nasser Mazeed Abdullah Al-Subei'ei on the press releases from Saudi officials, when he was repatriated on February 21, 2007.
- His name was transliterated as Nasser Mazyad Abdullah Al-Subaiy on the official list of captives whose habeas corpus petitions should be dismissed following their transfer from US custody.

== Combatant Status Review Tribunal ==
Initially the Bush administration asserted that they could withhold all the protections of the Geneva Conventions to captives from the war on terror. This policy was challenged before the Judicial branch. Critics argued that the USA could not evade its obligation to conduct a competent tribunals to determine whether captives are, or are not, entitled to the protections of prisoner of war status.

Subsequently the Department of Defense instituted the Combatant Status Review Tribunals. The Tribunals, however, were not authorized to determine whether the captives were lawful combatants—rather they were merely empowered to make a recommendation as to whether the captive had previously been correctly determined to match the Bush administration's definition of an enemy combatant.

== Habeas corpus ==
The record shows this captive had at least two habeas corpus petitions submitted on his behalf.

=== Nasir Maziyad Abdallah Al Qurayshi Al Asubayi v. George W. Bush ===
A writ of habeas corpus. Nasir Maziyad Abdallah Al Qurayshi Al Asubayi v. George W. Bush, was submitted on Nasir Maziyad Abdallah Al Qurayshi Al Asubayi's behalf. In response, on 18 October 2005, the Department of Defense released fifteen pages of unclassified documents related to his Combatant Status Review Tribunal.

On 19 October 2004 Tribunal panel 13 confirmed his "enemy combatant" status.

His Personal Representative met with him, for half an hour, on 13 October 2004. The decision memo records:

The Personal Representative asked the detainee if he wanted to participate in the Tribunal. The detainee would not answer any questions, only rambled. Due to the detainee's uncooperative and unresponsive behavior, along with his arrogant and belligerent demeanor, the Personal Representative could only conclude that the detainee refused to participate. The detainee did not request any witnesses nor did he request any classified or unclassified documents be produced. The detainee's sole unsworn statement to his Personal Representative was that all evidence against him was false.

=== Al-Subaiy v. Bush ===
Another writ of habeas corpus, Al-Subaiy v. Bush, where he was known as "Nasser Mazyad Abdullah Al-Subaiy"', was submitted on his behalf.

== Administrative Review Board hearing ==
Detainees who were determined to have been properly classified as "enemy combatants" were scheduled to have their dossier reviewed at annual Administrative Review Board hearings. The Administrative Review Boards weren't authorized to review whether a detainee qualified for POW status, and they weren't authorized to review whether a detainee should have been classified as an "enemy combatant".

They were authorized to consider whether a detainee should continue to be detained by the United States, because they continued to pose a threat—or whether they could safely be repatriated to the custody of their home country, or whether they could be set free.

== Guantanamo record ==
There is no record that Al Subii chose to participate in either his Combatant Status Review Tribunal or Administrative Review Board.

== Repatriation ==
Al Subii was repatriated on February 21, 2007, along with six other Saudis. The seven men were detained, without charge, in Hayer Prison, while Saudi justice officials determined whether they had violated any Saudi laws.
