= Abdul Majid Muhammed =

Iranian Guantanamo detainee

- Born: 1978 (age 47–48); Zahedan, Iran
- Detained at: Guantanamo
- ISN: 555
- Charge: No charge (held in extrajudicial detention)
- Status: Released

Abdul Majid Muhammed (Persian: عبدالمجید محمد) is a citizen of Iran who was held in extrajudicial detention in the United States Guantanamo Bay detention camp in Cuba.

His Guantanamo Internment Serial Number was 555. Joint Task Force Guantanamo counter-terrorism analysts estimate he was born in 1978, in Zahedan, Iran.

Abdul Majid Muhammed was captured in Afghanistan and was transferred to Iran on October 11, 2006.

== Press reports ==
The Guardian reported on March 15, 2006, that Muhammad was accused of serving as a night watchman for the Taliban.

== Combatant Status Review Tribunal ==
Combatant Status Review Tribunals were held in a 3 x 6 meter trailer. The captive sat with his hands cuffed and feet shackled to a bolt in the floor. Three chairs were reserved for members of the press, but only 37 of the 574 Tribunals were observed.

Initially, the Bush administration asserted that they could withhold all the protections of the Geneva Conventions to captives from the war on terror. This policy was challenged before the Judicial branch. Critics argued that the United States could not evade its obligation to conduct a competent tribunals to determine whether captives are, or are not, entitled to the protections of prisoner of war status.

Subsequently, the Department of Defense instituted the Combatant Status Review Tribunals. The Tribunals, however, were not authorized to determine whether the captives were lawful combatants—rather they were merely empowered to make a recommendation as to whether the captive had previously been correctly determined to match the Bush administration's definition of an enemy combatant.

=== Summary of Evidence memo ===
A Summary of Evidence memo was prepared for Abdul Majid Muhammed's Combatant Status Review Tribunal, on 3 December 2004.

The detainee is a member of the Taliban.
1. The Detainee traveled to Afghanistan after September 11, 2001.
2. The Detainee was identified as a "Watchman" for the Taliban.
3. As a "Watchman," the Detainee was on patrol for the Taliban.
4. The Detainee was captured by the Northern Alliance in the vicinity of Ghazni, Afghanistan.

=== Transcript ===
Muhammed chose to participate in his Combatant Status Review Tribunal.

His Tribunal was convened on December 10, 2004.

=== Tribunal documents ===
Lieutenant Commander Peter C. Bradford, one of the officers from the Judge Advocate General's Corps tasked to serve as a legal advisor to the CSR Tribunals, wrote a Legal Sufficiency Review, dated February 5, 2005.

His status was considered by the 12th panel of officers sitting on Combatant Status Review Tribunal.

The president of his tribunal was a colonel in the United States Marine Corps Reserve. The JAG officer was a lieutenant colonel in the United States Army. The third member was a lieutenant colonel in the United States Air Force.

=== Conclusions ===
Abdul Majid Mujahid' CSR Tribunal concluded that he had been properly determined to have been an enemy combatant:

In particular, the Tribunal finds that this detainee was part of, or supporting, the Hezb-e-Islami Gulbuddin (HIG) group, an associated force engaged in hostilities against the United States and its allies, as more fully discussed in the enclosures.

== Abdul Majid Muhammed v. George W. Bush ==
A writ of habeas corpus was submitted on Abdul Majid Muhammed's behalf. The Department of Defense released a 32-page dossier of unclassified documents from his CSR Tribunal.

A declaration from Commander Teresa M. Palmer, one of the officers from the Judge Advocate General's Corps tasked to serve as a legal advisor to the CSR Tribunals, was dated August 15, 2005.

== Administrative Review Board hearing ==
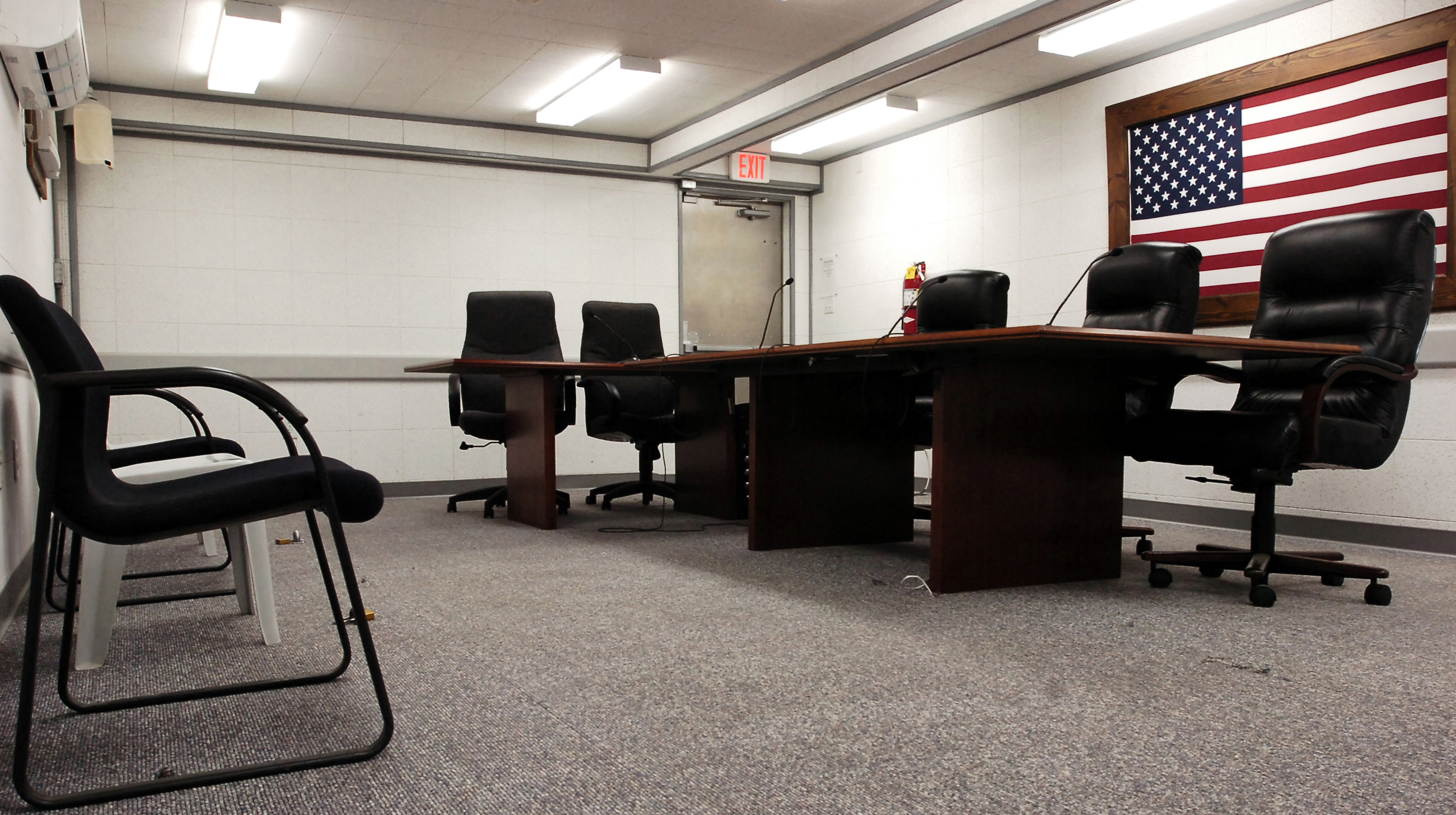
Hearing room where Guantanamo captive's annual Administrative Review Board hearings convened for captives whose Combatant Status Review Tribunal had already determined they were an "enemy combatant".

Detainees who were determined to have been properly classified as "enemy combatants" were scheduled to have their dossier reviewed at annual Administrative Review Board hearings.

The Administrative Review Boards were not authorized to review whether a detainee qualified for POW status, and they were not authorized to review whether a detainee should have been classified as an "enemy combatant".

They were authorized to consider whether a detainee should continue to be detained by the United States because they continued to pose a threat—or whether they could safely be repatriated to the custody of their home country, or whether they could be set free.

=== Summary of Evidence memo ===
A Summary of Evidence memo was prepared for Abdul Majid Muhammed's Administrative Review Board on 12 August 2005.

The memo listed factors for and against his continued detention.

The following factors favor continued detention

a. Commitment
1. The detainee worked for a long time as a drug courier between Afghanistan and Iran.
2. The detainee had an Afghani person obtain a letter from the Hezb-e Islami Gulbuddin allowing the detainee to cross the border from Iran to Afghanistan. The detainee paid 5,000 in Iranian money (NFI).
3. Hezb-e Islami Gulbuddin (HIG) has long-established ties with Usama Bin Ladin. (HIG) founder Gulbuddin Hikmatyar offered to shelter Bin Ladin after the latter fled Sudan in 1996. HIG has staged small attacks in its attempt to force U.S. troops to withdraw from Afghanistan, overthrow the Afghan Transitional Administration (ATA) and establish a fundamentalist state.

b. Training:

The detainee was in the Iranian army for 3-4 years before he went to Afghanistan. While in the military he was trained in basic drill and the AK-47.

The following factors favor the release of transfer

a. The detainee has been diagnosed with a severe borderline personality disorder.

b. The detainee answered no to questions about belonging to anti U.S. groups, attacking coalition forces, or plans to attack coalition forces if released.

=== Transcript ===
Muhammed chose to participate in his Administrative Review Board hearing.

In the Spring of 2006, in response to a court order from Jed Rakoff, the Department of Defense published an eight-page summarized transcript from his Administrative Review Board.
