= Adel al Zamel =

- Born: August 23, 1963 (age 63); Kuwait City, Kuwait
- Detained at: Guantanamo
- Other names: Adil Zamil Abdull Mohssin al Zamil; Adel al Zamel
- ISN: 568
- Status: Repatriated to Kuwait, charged, tried, acquitted

Adel al Zamel (عادل عبد المحسن الزميل) is a citizen of Kuwait who was held in extrajudicial detention in the United States Guantanamo Bay detention camps, in Cuba.

Joint Task Force Guantanamo counter-terrorism analysts report that Al Zamel was born on August 23, 1963, in Kuwait City, Kuwait.

Al Zamel was captured in Pakistan in February 2002 and he was transferred to Kuwait on November 2, 2005.

== Al Odah v. United States ==
Adel al Zamel was among the eleven captives covered in the July 2008 "Petitioners' Status Report" filed by David J. Cynamon in Al Odah v. United States on behalf of the four remaining Kuwaiti prisoners in Guantanamo. Seven other prisoners were amalgamated to the case, which charged that none of the men had been cleared for release, even though the government had completed factual returns for them—and those factual returns had contained redacted sections.

The decision, striking down the Military Commissions Act, was handed down on June 12, 2008.

== Repatriation and Acquittal ==
Al Zamil was one of five Kuwaitis repatriated to Kuwaiti custody on November 4, 2005.

The five stood trial in a Kuwaiti court, and were acquitted.

The Washington Post reported that the two main charges were that the detainees had helped fund Al Wafa, an Afghan charity with ties to Al Qaeda, and that they had fought alongside the Taliban.

The detainees' defense had argued that testimony secured in Guantanamo could not be used in Kuwaiti courts, because the detainees and interrogators hadn't signed them.

Al Zamil's trial began in March 2006, and he was acquitted on July 22, 2006.

== McClatchy interview ==
On June 15, 2008, the McClatchy News Service published articles based on interviews with 66 former Guantanamo captives. McClatchy reporters interviewed Adel al Zamel.

Adel al Zamel told McClatchy reporters he had worked for the Kuwait housing authority until 2000 when he moved to Afghanistan to work for the al Wafa charity, and that he had never been anything more than a charity worker, distributing food and overseeing small infrastructure projects.

Adel al Zamel told McClatchy reporters that he still hadn't recovered from his initial meetings two and a half months earlier, when he was transferred to Guantanamo. He described being shown a diagram, with three names on it, linked by arrows: UBL, Abu Ghaith, "you", linked by arrows. When he denied being linked to Osama bin Laden he was locked, for a month, in a small metal box, with no toilet facilities:

- "The cell was hot. I couldn't sleep at night. The pillow was soaked with my sweat. There was a small opening in the cell wall; I used to push my nose to it. I used the bathroom on the floor; there was nothing else to do."
- "I thought they were going to kill me, and then I thought they were going to leave me in there until I died. I was losing my mind. I started to think that one day they were going to open the door and let a lion in to eat me. The world was getting smaller and smaller."

Adel al Zamel told reporters that during 2005, his last year in Guantanamo, interrogators repeatedly threatened that he would be transferred to a torture state for more brutal interrogation. Adel al Zamel said that, finally, the interrogators treatment cracked his will, and he told them:

I told them, 'I am Osama bin Laden. Please kill me. I just wanted it to end.

The McClatchy report stated Adel Al Zamel and some associates had been sentenced to a year in prison for an attack on a young woman they thought was being too publicly affectionate with her boyfriend.

== See also ==
- Abdul-Aziz al-Shimmiri
- Abdallah Saleh Ali Al Ajmi
- Saad Madhi al-Azmi
- Mohammed Fnaitil al-Dehani
