= Al Joudi v. Bush =

Al Joudi v. Bush (Civil Action No. 05-cv-301) is a United States District Court for the District of Columbia case. On February 9, 2005, a Petition for a Writ of Habeas Corpus was filed on behalf of four Guantanamo detainees: Majid Abdulla Al Joudi, Yousif Mohammad Mubarak Al-Shehri, Abdulla Mohammad Al Ghanmi and Abdul-Hakim Abdul-Rahman Al-Moosa, before US District Court Judge Gladys Kessler. It was one of over 200 habeas corpus petitions filed in the US District Court on behalf of detainees held in the Guantanamo Bay detention camp in Cuba, seeking release. On March 26, 2008, Judge Gladys Kessler dismissed the petition as moot.

== Lead Counsel ==
In January 2007 the Center for Constitution Rights published a list of the counsels of the "lead petitioners" in the captives various habeas petitions. The list records Martin Flumenbaum and Tarver Julia Mason of PAUL WEISS RIFKIND WHARTON & GARRISON LLP as the counsel to the lead petitioner on this petition.

== Access to Counsel and Seizure of privileged lawyer-client documents ==
In an opinion dated October 26, 2005, the US District Court ordered the US government to provide information to counsel regarding a detainee's physical condition.

On June 10, 2006 the Department of Defense reported that three captives died in custody. The Department of Defense stated that the three men committed suicide. Camp authorities called the deaths "an act of asymmetric warfare", and suspected plans had been coordinated by the captive's attorneys—so they seized all the captives' documents, including the captives' copies of their habeas documents. Since the habeas documents were privileged lawyer-client communication the Department of Justice was compelled to file documents about the document seizures. Majid Abdulla Al Joudi and Abdulla Mohammad Al Ghanmi's papers were seized.

== Military Commissions Act ==
The Military Commissions Act of 2006 mandated that Guantanamo captives were no longer entitled to access the US civil justice system, so all outstanding habeas corpus petitions were stayed.

== Boumediene v. Bush ==
On June 12, 2008, the United States Supreme Court ruled, in Boumediene v. Bush, that the Military Commissions Act could not remove the right for Guantanamo captives to access the US Federal Court system. And all previous Guantanamo captives' habeas petitions were eligible to be re-instated. The Supreme Court decision did not define "enemy combatant", according to U.S. District Judge Richard J. Leon, who indicated that in his case involving Guantanamo Bay detainees, he would issue a ruling on whether they were enemy combatants before holding hearings to evaluate the evidence against them.

== Repatriated captives seeking relief ==
On April 17, 2007, the United States Department of Justice moved to dismiss several hundred habeas petitions because the captives had been set free, repatriated, or died in custody. Majid Abdulla Al Joudi and Abdulla Mohammad Al Ghanmi were among those the DoJ requested to be dismissed. US District Court Judge Thomas F. Hogan list this petition as one where former captives were entitled to seek relief for their detention. On March 26, 2008, Judge Gladys Kessler ruled that the court had no habeas jurisdiction over petitioners no longer in custody, as the petitioners failed to show the continued existence of a case or controversy. The petition was dismissed as moot.
