= Swar Khan =

Afghan Guantanamo detainee

- Born: 1970 (age 55–56); Khost
- Released: 2006-10-11; Afghanistan
- Citizenship: Afghanistan
- Detained at: Guantanamo
- Other name: Swatkhan Bahar
- ISN: 933
- Status: Repatriated

Swar Khan, also known as Swatkhan Bahar (born c. 1970), is a citizen of Afghanistan, who was held in extrajudicial detention in the United States's Guantanamo Bay detention camps, in Cuba.

Khan was a security official for the Hamid Karzai government prior to his capture. His boss told reporters that his capture was due to false denunciations from a jealous rival, whose sons worked as interpreters for the Americans, and that he had tried to tell the Americans he should be set free—without success.

== Writ of habeas corpus ==
Khan had a writ of habeas corpus, Swat Khan v. Bush, filed on his behalf in Maryland in 2005. He was represented by James Wyda and Martin Bahl, Federal Public Defenders in Maryland.

== Repatriation ==
Khan was transferred to Afghanistan on October 11, 2006.

== McClatchy interview ==
On June 15, 2008, the McClatchy News Service published articles based on interviews with 66 former Guantanamo detainees. Khan was one of the interviewees.

Tom Lasseter, the lead McClatchy reporter, wrote that while his Tribunal President ruled that even though he had offered their phone numbers the witnesses he requested were not 'reasonably available' but McClatchy reporters "had little trouble" phoning one of them, his boss Mohammed Mustafa, at the Afghan Interior Ministry. Mustafa confirmed that Khan had been falsely denounced by a rival in the Afghan security services.

"There was no proof against him, nothing indicating he was involved with these sorts of activities," Mustafa said. "I went to the Americans' base and asked them to release him, but they wouldn't."

Khan spoke about being beaten in Bagram, and being hung from the ceiling by his wrists in an isolation cell.

Khan described attempting suicide twice in Guantanamo. Following his repatriation, the Governor of his province offered him another position as a police officer, but he declined.

== See also ==
- Bagram torture and prisoner abuse
- Guantanamo Bay detention camp suicide attempts
