= Thomas Wilner =

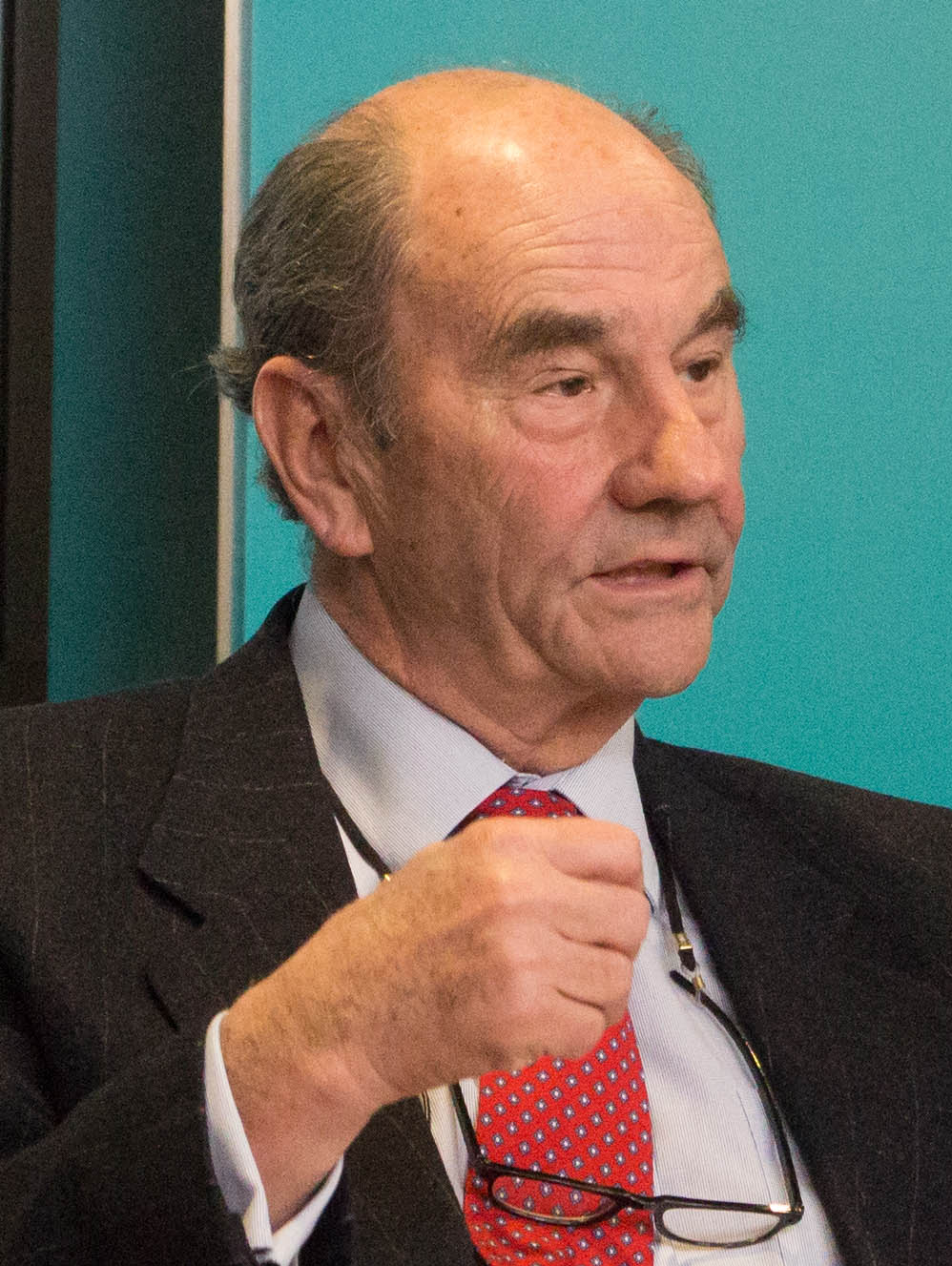
- Wilner in January 2017
- Other name: Tom Wilner
- Occupation: lawyer
- Known for: human rights cases
- Children: Adam Wilner, Amanda Miller, David Wilner. Grandchildren: Brack Wilner, Charlotte Wilner, Michael Wilner, Sophia Wilner, Elsa Miller, Sylvia Miller

Thomas B. Wilner (born 1944) is the managing partner of Shearman & Sterling's International Trade and Global Relations Practice. Wilner has also represented the high-profile human rights cases of a dozen Kuwaiti citizens detained in the United States naval base at Guantanamo Bay, Cuba.

Wilner earned his law degree in 1969 from the University of Pennsylvania Law School.

Wilner has been admitted to the bar in a number of jurisdictions, including the US Supreme Court in 1975.
