= Anas Al Kandari =

Anas al-Kandari
- Born: 1981
- Died: October 8, 2002 (aged 20–21); Failaka Island, Kuwait
- Occupation: Muslim
- Known for: Dying in an attack on U.S. Marines

Anas al-Kandari (1981 – October 8, 2002) was a Kuwaiti terrorist. He died in a firefight on Failaka Island, with United States Marines on October 8, 2002. A U.S. Marine was also killed in the incident as was al-Kandari's fellow fighter Jassem al-Hajiri.

== Career ==
Al-Kandari grew up in Salwa, Kuwait. Stewart Bell, author The Martyr's Oath, reports that his father invested in the Souk al-Manakh, which Bell described as "Kuwait's unofficial stock exchange". Anas al-Kandari's father made millions, until the stock bubble burst and he went bankrupt.

Al-Kandari is reported to have spent 18 months in Afghanistan. He is reported to have returned to Kuwait a few days before al-Qaeda's attacks on the U.S. on September 11 attacks.

Al-Kandari is reported to have fasted before the attack—which was triggered by recent broadcasts of the dead and wounded in a town in the Gaza Strip that had been bombarded by Israel.

Bell reports that Mohammed Mansour Jabarah, an important source on al-Qaeda's operation, stopped cooperating with his interrogators when he learned that his best friend Anas al-Kandari had been killed. Bell reports that Jabarah had traveled to Afghanistan with Anas al-Kandari in 2000.
