= Mohammed Fenaitel Mohamed Al Daihani =

Kuwaiti detainee at Guantanamo Bay

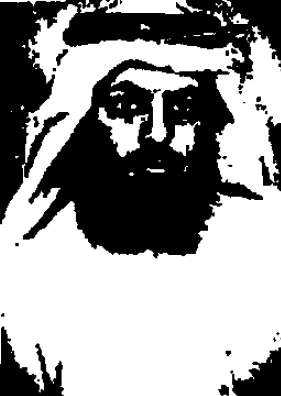
- Born: November 4, 1965 (age 61); Kuwait City, Kuwait
- Detained at: Guantanamo Bay camp
- Other names: Mohammed Funaitel al Dihani; Mohammed Fenaitel Mohamed al Daihani
- ISN: 229
- Charge: No charge
- Status: Repatriated

Mohammed Fenaitel Mohamed Al Daihani is a citizen of Kuwait who was held in extrajudicial detention in the United States Guantanamo Bay detention camp, in Cuba. Al Daihani's Guantanamo Internment Serial Number was 229. Joint Task Force Guantanamo counter-terrorism analysts reports that Al Daihani was born on November 4, 1965, in Kuwait City, Kuwait. Al Dehani was repatriated without charges on November 2, 2005.

== Combatant Status Review ==
A Summary of Evidence memo was prepared for his tribunal. The memo listed the following:

a. The detainee is associated with al Qaida and provided support to forces engaged in hostilities against the United States or its coalition partners:

1. The detainee worked for the Revival of Islamic Heritage Society.
2. The Revival of Islamic Heritage Society appears on the Terrorist Exclusion List of the U.S. Dept of Homeland Security Terrorist Organization Reference Guide.
3. The detainee's name appeared on a hard drive recovered from a suspected al Qaida safe house in Islamabad, Pakistan.
4. The detainee voluntarily traveled from Kuwait to Mecca, Saudi Arabia on Hajj in 2000, where he met Faisal (FNU), an employee of the Sanabal Charitable Committee.
5. The Sanabal Charitable Committee is considered a fund raising front for the Libyan Islamic Fighting Group.
6. The Libyan Islamic Fighting Group is listed as a terrorist organization in the U.S. Department of Homeland Security Terrorist Organization Reference Guide.
7. The Detainee admitted to donating approximately 2,250 dinars to the Sanabal Charitable Committee.
8. The Detainee voluntarily flew from Karachi, Pakistan on 9 September 2001, where he first joined Faisal and Abdul Hakeem.
9. Abdul Hakeem was identified as an employee of the Sanabal Charitable Committee.
10. Hakeem was also identified as a major recruiter for the LIFG
11. Sometime after 9 September 2001, the Detainee, Faisal and Hakeem traveled to Kandahar, Afghanistan.
12. In December 2001, the Detainee failed at attempts to be smuggled across the Iranian border.
13. The Detainee traveled between Kandahar, Kabul, Herat, and Jalalabad, Afghanistan during November/December 2001, before being smuggled into Pakistan, apprehended by Pakistani authorities and turned over to U.S. forces.

On March 3, 2006, in order to comply with a court order, the Department of Defense published a twelve-page summarized transcript from his Tribunal.

=== Administrative Review Board ===
Detainees whose Combatant Status Review Tribunal labeled them "enemy combatants" were scheduled for annual Administrative Review Board hearings. These hearings were designed to assess the threat a detainee might pose if released or transferred, and whether there were other factors that warranted his continued detention.

=== Summary of Evidence memo ===
A Summary of Evidence memo was prepared for Mohammed Fenaitel Mohamed Al Daihani's Administrative Review Board, on April 22, 2005. The memo listed factors for and against his continued detention.

The following primary factors favor continued detention

a. Connections/Associations

1. A foreign government service has linked the detainee to the official spokesman for al Qaida.
2. After 11 September 2001, the detainee was at the home of an individual who helped facilitate travel to Afghanistan.
3. This individual is an extremist who was contacted by a senior al Qaida lieutenant to raise money for operations in Israel. This individual has personally traveled to Afghanistan to deliver a message to Usama Bin Ladin in Qandahar.
4. The detainee's name appeared on a hard drive recovered from a suspected al Qaida safe house in Islamabad, Pakistan.

b. Intent

1. The detainee voluntarily traveled from Kuwait to Mecca, Saudi Arabia, on Hajj in 2000, where he met Faisal, an employee of the Sanabal Charitable Committee.
2. The Sanabal employee and the detainee saw each other every month to every month and a half. The Sanabal employee spoke with the detainee on at least four occasions about going to Afghanistan.
3. Sanabil's first priority was providing support to the Jihad activities of the Libyan Islamic fighting Group.
4. The detainee admitted donating approximately 2,250 dinars to the Sanabal Charitable Committee.
5. The Libyan Islamic Fighting Group (LIFG) is designated a foreign terrorist organization by the U.S. Department of Homeland Security.
6. The detainee voluntarily flew from Kuwait to Karachi, Pakistan, on 9 September 2001, where he joined Faisal and Abdul Hakeem.
7. Abdul Hakeem was identified as an employee of the Sanabal Charitable Committee.
8. Hakeem was also identified as a major recruiter for the LIFG.
9. Sometime after 9 September 2001, the detainee, Faisal, and Hakeem traveled to Kandahar, Afghanistan.
10. In December 2001, the detainee failed at attempts to be smuggled across the Iranian border.
11. The detainee traveled between Kandahar, Kabul, Herat and Jalalabad Afghanistan, during November/December 2001, before being smuggled into Pakistan, apprehended by Pakistani authorities, and turned over to US forces.

The following primary factors favor release or transfer

According to the detainee, the purpose of his eventual travel to Afghanistan was solely to verify the Sanabal Charitable Committee's work of building wells. Although the detainee had reservations about traveling to Afghanistan, he wanted to ensure that the money he donated, 2,250 dinars, had in fact been used to build five wells.

=== Transcript ===
On March 3, 2006, in compliance with a court order, the Department of Defense published a two-page summarized transcript of his hearing.

== Press reports ==
Canadian journalist, and former special assistant to US President George W. Bush, David Frum, published an article based on his own reading of the transcripts from the Combatant Status Review Tribunals, on November 11, 2006. It was Frum who coined the term "Axis of evil" for use in a speech he wrote for Bush. Al Daihani's transcript was one of the nine Frum briefly summarized. His comment on Al Daihani was:

One detainee, a Kuwaiti national named as an al Qaida operative on a captured al Qaida hard drive, was captured as he tried to flee from Afghanistan into Iran. He insisted that he had no association with any terrorist organization. What then had brought him to Afghanistan? His answer: He had donated 750 Kuwaiti dinars ("not a lot of money" he added) to an Islamic charity to dig wells in Afghanistan – and had decided to travel from Kuwait to see that his money was properly spent.

Frum came to the conclusion that all nine of the men whose transcript he summarized had obviously lied. He did not, however, state how he came to the conclusion they lied. His article concluded with the comment:

But what's the excuse of those in the West who succumb so easily to the deceptions of terrorists who cannot invent even half-way plausible lies?

== Al Odah v. United States ==
Mohammed Fenaitel Mohamed Al Daihani was among the eleven captives covered in the July 2008 "Petitioners' Status Report" filed by David J. Cynamon in Al Odah v. United States on behalf of the four remaining Kuwaiti prisoners in Guantanamo. Seven other prisoners were amalgamated to the case, which charged that none of the men had been cleared for release, even though the government had completed factual returns for them—and those factual returns had contained redacted sections.

The decision, striking down the Military Commissions Act, was handed down on June 12, 2008.

== Repatriation ==
On May 12, 2007, the Kuwait Times reported that the USA concluded negotiations regarding the repatriation of the remaining Kuwaiti captives.
