= Fouad Mahmoud al Rabiah =

Kuwaiti detainee at Guantanamo Bay

- Born: June 24, 1959 (age 67); Kuwait City, Kuwait
- Detained at: Guantanamo
- ISN: 551
- Charge: All charges dropped in 2009
- Status: Won his habeas corpus, released after 8 years

Fouad Mahmoud Hasan al Rabiah (born June 24, 1959) is a Kuwaiti, who was held in the United States Guantanamo Bay detainment camps, in Cuba from May 2002 to December 2009. Al Rabia's Guantanamo Internment Serial Number was 551.

Al Rabia was an executive with Kuwait's national airline before his wrongful arrest and extradition. He had studied in the United States, and described himself as an America-phile. He is also a philanthropist, along with members of his family, and they regularly followed-up to observed in person the charitable enterprises they donated to. He had routinely made preliminary and follow-up field trips to check on projects they had donated to. In 2001, he described traveling to Afghanistan, for charitable purposes.

Al Rabia was to face charges in 2008 before a Guantanamo military commission, but all charges were dropped in 2009.

In September 2009, Al Rabia's habeas corpus petition concluded, and US District Court Judge ordered that he be released "forthwith". That release occurred on December 9, 2009. Al Rabiah's lawyers called on President Barack Obama to apologise on behalf of the United States and provide "appropriate compensation" to al Rabiah for his ordeal.

== Guantanamo military commission ==
On October 22, 2008, the Office of Military Commissions filed charges against Fouad Al Rabia and Fayiz Al Kandari.

On August 12, 2009, Fouad Al Rabia's Defense Counsel, Lieutenant Commander Kevin Bogucki asserted his clearance for travel to Kuwait was being withheld.

All charges were dropped in 2009.

== Fouad al Rabia's weight ==
The documents published when charges were proposed against Fouad al Rabia included the weights recorded by the camp's medical staff.

== Torture ==
CNN published an article based on interviews with Fouad and other former Guantanamo captives, entitled "Former Guantanamo inmates tell of confessions under 'torture'". Al Rabiah told Jenifer Fenton he was tortured by his initial Northern Alliance captors, tortured in the Kandahar detention facility, tortured in the Bagram Collection Point, and tortured in Guantanamo. He told her he had been interrogated over 200 times, including "lots and lots of torture". Al Rabiah showed Fenton a copy of a two-page letter found in Tora Bora that he was tortured into confessing he wrote. The letter's author wrote that he and his son Abdullah lead an attack in Afghanistan in 1991. However, while Al Rabiah's son is named Abdullah, he was only one year old in 1991.

Al Rabiah told Fenton he started to confess to all his interrogators accusations after he was asked "Would you like to go home a drug addict?" He told Fenton that he regarded this as one of the threats, that triggered his false confessions.

== Repatriation ==
On May 12, 2007, the Kuwait Times reported that Kuwait and the USA concluded negotiations regarding the repatriation of the remaining Kuwaiti captives.

== Immediate release ==
Mr. al Rabiah can never reclaim the eight years he lost at Guantanamo Bay - and the United States must not simply turn and forget.

— His lawyer David Cynamon

On September 17, 2009, US District Court Judge Colleen Kollar-Kotelly ordered that Al Rabia could no longer be detained under the Authorization for the Use of Military Force and ordered the government to release him from detention at Guantanamo Bay He was repatriated on December 9, 2009. The U.S. Department of Justice announced that he had been transferred from the detention facility at Guantanamo Bay to the control of the government of Kuwait. The transfer was carried out under an arrangement between the United States and the government of Kuwait. The United States would continue to consult with the government of Kuwait regarding Al Rabia.

== See also ==
- Sleep deprivation
