= Martin Mubanga =

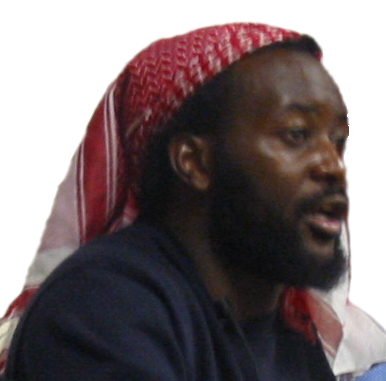
- Mubanga in 2005 after his release
- Citizenship: United Kingdom, Zambian
- Detained at: Guantánamo
- ISN: 10007
- Charge(s): No charge, held in extrajudicial detention
- Status: Repatriated

Martin Mubanga is a dual citizen of both the United Kingdom and Zambia. He was held, without charge, and interrogated at the American prison at Guantanamo Bay for 33 months.

In 1995, he spent six months in Bosnia working for a charity.

In January 2005, when American authorities transferred him to UK custody, after a brief interrogation British officials determined there were no grounds to charge Mubanga with any crimes, and he was released. The Bush administration routinely described the Guantanamo detainees as having been unlawful combatants, who were captured on the battlefield. Mubanga, however, was the victim of an extraordinary rendition from Zambia, without having an opportunity to challenge his capture or rendition. Under the Royal Prerogative, the United Kingdom government has declined to issue a new passport to Mubanga and three other of the nine freed British Guantanamo detainees.

== Combatant Status Review ==
George W. Bush administration asserted they could withhold the protections of the Geneva Conventions from captives in the "war on terror". Critics argued the Conventions obliged the United States to conduct competent tribunals to determine the status of prisoners. Subsequently, the US Department of Defense instituted Combatant Status Review Tribunals, to determine whether the captives met the new definition of an "enemy combatant."

The CSRTs are not bound by the rules of evidence that would apply in court, and the government's evidence is presumed to be "genuine and accurate."

The trailer where CSRTs were convened.

From July 2004 through March 2005, a CSRT was convened to make a determination whether each captive had been correctly classified as an "enemy combatant". Martin Mubanga was among the two-thirds of prisoners who chose to participate in their tribunals.

A Summary of Evidence memo was prepared for the tribunal, listing the alleged facts that led to his detention.

== Complaints against the US ==
Mubanga has described being the subject of brutal and abusive treatment during his incarceration and interrogation while in US custody.

Mubanga was living with relatives, in Zambia, when he was arrested by Zambian Police, accompanied by US security officials. He was not charged with any crime in Zambia. He was transported out of Zambia without the US requesting an official extradition. His transport is one of the well-known uses of the technique known in the US as extraordinary rendition.

Mubanga describes being shackled so long he lost control of his bladder, and then being daubed with his own urine.

Mubanga says the most difficult part of his incarceration was being told that he was going to be transported back to the UK, only to be told that transfer was cancelled, and having his cell stripped of everything, including even his clothes and bedding, for a further incarceration of several more months.

== Complaints against the UK ==
Mubanga says that when he was first arrested, in Zambia, he was interrogated by a British man who claimed he was an "MI6 official," and an American woman who told him she was a "Defence official". They told him that his UK passport, which he had reported stolen, was found in an al-Qaeda cave in Afghanistan. They invited him to be an undercover agent, to penetrate al Qaeda for them. When he declined, they shipped him to the US military prison at Guantanamo Bay.

With the help of UK lawyer Louise Christian, Mubanga sued the UK government for its cooperation with American security officials. The government settled with 16 British citizens in 2010.

== See also ==
- British detainees at Guantanamo Bay
