= Kristine A. Huskey =

American lawyer

Kristine Huskey is an American lawyer. Huskey is notable because she volunteered to help defend Guantanamo detainees. Huskey is the author of "Standards and Procedures for Classifying "Enemy Combatants": Congress, What Have You Done?"

Huskey grew up in Alaska.

== Personal life and education ==
Huskey was born and raised in Anchorage, Alaska. Her family moved to Saudi Arabia after her father, an Air Force pilot, took a post there. She returned to the United States to attend Interlochen Arts Academy for dance before moving to New York City to pursue a career in dance and modeling.

She attended Columbia University in New York, New York for her undergraduate studies. Huskey graduated with a Bachelor of Arts in Political Science in 1992, magna cum laude and Phi Beta Kappa. In 1996, she continued on to attend the Centre for Commercial Law Studies University of London's Queen Mary and Westfield College. Kristine then attended the University of Texas at Austin for law school, where she graduated from in 1997 with a Juris Doctor.

== Professional career ==
Huskey was a law clerk in the Texas Court of Appeals in the Third District in Austin, Texas for Justice Bea Ann Smith in civil and criminal appeals from 1997 to 1998.

She worked as an attorney at the Washington, D.C. office of the New York-based law firm Shearman & Sterling LLP in the International Litigation and Arbitration Practice Group from 1998 to 2006. Before working with Guantanamo detainees, she represented international entities such as OPEC and PDVSA in litigation, arbitration, and negotiation with the US and foreign government agencies. Huskey was one of the lawyers who represented Guantanamo detainees in Rasul v. Bush.

Huskey also worked on the case in an attempt to support Canadian Guantanamo captive Omar Khadr, who commonly known as "Guantanamo's kid" and one of the ten captives who has faced charges before a Guantanamo military commission.

In an interview with the Council on Hemispheric Affairs Huskey said:

It's so easy to say that they are terrorists and that terrorists don't deserve rights, but because they were never given rights to begin with, like the right to a fair trial for instance, how did we reach the decision that they are even terrorists?

Huskey told WJLA that she received death threats because of her work helping Guantanamo captives. WJLA reported that Huskey paid 13 visits to Guantanamo.

Huskey was one of the invited speakers at a July 2009 event, organized by the American Society of International Law, entitled "Women in International Law Networking Breakfast". The other speakers were Andrea Prasow, Laura Black and Andrea Menaker.

Huskey is the Director of the Anti-Torture Program at Physicians for Human Rights in Washington, DC, where she leads policy and advocacy work aimed at strengthening international human rights norms in US national security law, policy, and practice. She has most recently appeared on Al-Jazeera and Huffington Post Live discussing issues related to national security, human rights, and detainee rights.

== Academic career ==
She has served as a visiting professor, at various institutions, specializing in human rights and national security, including:

- Georgetown University
- University of Texas at Austin
- American University Washington College of Law
- George Washington University Law School
- Victoria University of Wellington, Faculty of Law

In the summer of 2007, Huskey became a Professor at her alma mater, the University of Texas School of Law, and became the founding director of its newly established National Security & Human Rights Clinic. In 2013, Huskey joined the University of Arizona James E. Rogers College of Law as a Clinical Professor of Law, the Director of the Veterans Advocacy Clinic, and the Director of Clinics. She teaches international human rights, and constitutional law to first-year law students.

== Publications ==
Huskey co-wrote a book based on her experiences as legal counsel to Guantanamo detainees: "Justice at Guantanamo: One Woman's Odyssey and Her Crusade for Human Rights".

Huskey has also published a number of law review articles. Among those are the following:

1. "A Strategic Imperative: Legal Representation of Unprivileged Enemy Belligerents in Status Determination Proceedings", Santa Clara Journal of International Law (2012)

2. "Guantanamo and Beyond: Reflections on the Past, Present, and Future of Preventive Detention", University of New Hampshire Law Review (2011)

3. "Hunger Strikes: Challenges to the Guantanamo Detainee Health Care Policy" with Stephen N. Xenakis, Whittier Law Review (2009)

4. "The American Way: Private Military Contractors & US Law after 9/11", Working Paper Series (2010)

5. "Standards and Procedures for Classifying 'Enemy, Combatants': Congress, What Have You Done?"
