= Khalid Abdullah Mishal al Mutairi =

Kuwaiti Guantanamo detainee

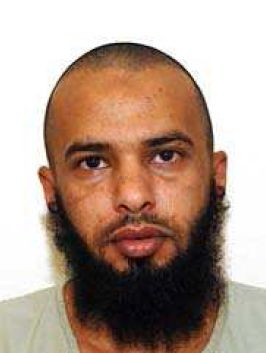
- Khalid Abdullah Mishal al Mutairi
- Born: June 18, 1975 (age 51); Kuwait City, Kuwait
- Detained at: Guantanamo
- Other names: Khalid Abdullah Mishal Thamer al Mutayri; Khalid Bin Abdullah Mishal Thamer al Hameydani; Khaled al Mutairi
- ISN: 213
- Charge: No charge (unlawfully detained)
- Status: Repatriated

Khalid Abdullah Mishal al Mutairi (born June 18, 1975), also known as Khalid Hassan, is a Kuwaiti charity worker who was unlawfully detained in the United States Guantanamo Bay detainment camps, in Cuba. He was ordered released in August 2009, when it was determined that the law required the American government to prove his guilt, rather than demand al Mutairi prove his innocence. The ruling judge noted that al Mutairi had been "goaded" into making incriminating statements for interrogators, such as confessing alongside Osama bin Laden in 1991, while noting that some of his stories were contradictory.

Khalid Abdullah Mishal al Mutairi was captured near the Pakistan-Afghan border in November 2001 and he was transferred to Kuwait on October 13, 2009.

== Combatant Status Review ==
A typo in an intelligence report led to al-Mutayri being accused of manning an anti-aircraft weapon in Afghanistan, after the military officer confused two ISNs.

Al-Mutayri admitted leaving Kuwait only days after 9/11, with $15,000 in cash, and heading toward the Pakistan-Afghan border regions. His name later appeared on a list of captives detained in prison, which the United States used as evidence he was a member of al-Qaeda, a notion rejected by the judge.

While in Guantanamo, one of his interrogation sheets noted "ISN 213 was uncooperative. He stated that he wished to be called Osama bin Laden...ISN 213 stated he was an enemy of America because Americans had told him so. Americans cursed his parents. Prior to the war, he’d had no problem with Americans. But due to the situation at Guantanamo Bay, Cuba, and legal process being so useless, he might as well be Osama bin Laden, since he was never going to be freed from U.S. custody".

=== Ruling by Justice Colleen Kollar-Kotelly ===
US District Court Justice Colleen Kollar-Kotelly ruling on al-Mutayri's habeas petition has been cited in academic papers for its assertions of the weaknesses of the CSR Tribunal process.

== Repatriation ==
US District Court Judge Colleen Kollar-Kottely ordered the immediate repatriation of Khaled Al Mutairi on July 29, 2009. She further required the relevant agencies to produce an unclassified version of her ruling within 48 hours.

Kollar-Kottely noted that the allegation he attended a terrorist training camp relied on "one reference, in a portion of one sentence, in one interrogation report". She also ruled out placing any value on his presence on a published "list of captured mujahideen", because he was told that claiming to be a captured mujahideen would result in his name being published, so his family would know where he was.

Carol Rosenberg, writing in the Miami Herald, reported that Khalid Mutairi was one of two men transferred from Guantanamo on October 9, 2009.
