= Factual return (Guantanamo) =

Factual returns are documents a government has to file in response to habeas corpus petitions. Habeas corpus is a legal tool in the English tradition of justice, dating back to Magna Carta, prohibiting arbitrary arrest and detention. Captives are entitled to file a writ of habeas corpus before a judge, requiring the state to offer a justification for his or her detention.

== Guantanamo factual returns ==
On 18 November 2008 Gordon R. England, the Deputy Secretary of Defense file an affidavit in which he attempted to explain why the Bush administration was not complying with the Supreme Court's ruling in Boumediene v. Bush that Guantanamo captives were entitled to a prompt review of their status.

The factual return is supposed to include the information presented to the captives during their Combatant Status Review Tribunals and their annual Administrative Review Board hearings; the classified information that was presented to the officers who reviewed their status, but withheld from the captives, and the underlying information on which the original allegations were based.

The officers who sat on the CSR Tribunals and annual Review hearings weren't authorized to challenge the credibility of the allegations presented to them. But the Judicial Branch has insisted on viewing the actual evidence on which the allegations were based.

In the fall of 2007, the Department of Justice explained it could not produce the evidence on the allegations used to justify the captives' detention, because it had not preserved that evidence.

The Executive branch was expected to file fifty factual returns per month, starting in August 2008. But by March 2009 only 100 had been filed. The Executive branch was arguing that even the unclassified versions of the returns should be withheld from the public.

On June 1, 2009, Thomas F. Hogan, the Judge coordinating the Guantanamo habeas petitions, ordered that the executive branch had to make the unclassified factual returns public. He ruled that permission to withhold this information had only been temporary, to allow the documents to be checked to see if they contained classified information.
