= Faiz Mohammed Ahmed Al Kandari =

Kuwaiti citizen (born 1975)

Faiz Muhammed Ahmed Al Kandari
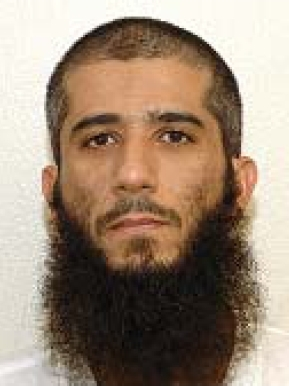
- Faiz Mohammed Ahmed Al Kandari's official Guantanamo identity portrait, showing him wearing the white uniform issued to "compliant" captives.
- Born: 3 June 1977 (age 49); Kuwait City, Kuwait
- Detained at: Guantanamo
- ISN: 552
- Charge: Charged October 2008, charges dropped
- Status: Released on 8 January 2016

Faiz Mohammed Ahmed Al Kandari (born 3 June 1977) is a Kuwaiti citizen who was held in extrajudicial detention in the United States' Guantanamo Bay detainment camp in Cuba, from 2002 to 2016. He has never been charged with war crimes.

The US Department of Defense reports he was born on 3 June 1977, in Kuwait City.

Kandari was transferred to Kuwait on 8 January 2016.

== Combatant Status Review ==
His Combatant Status Review Tribunal accused him of the following: "The detainee (Al Kandari) recruited personnel to participate in jihad in Afghanistan … traveled into Afghanistan and received weapons training at the Khaldan training camp. Osama bin Laden personally provided religious instruction and trainee (sic) at this camp." He has always denied the accusations and said: "I looked at all the unclassified accusations; I was laughing so hard." and "All this happened in a period of three months … I ask, 'Are these accusations against Faiz or against Superman?' It seems to me that whoever wrote these accusations he must (have) been drinking and he must have been drunk when he wrote it."

Scholars at the Brookings Institution, led by Benjamin Wittes, listed the captives still held in Guantanamo in December 2008, according to whether their detention was justified by certain common allegations:

- Faiz Mohammed Ahmed Al Kandari was listed as one of the captives who had faced charges before a military commission.
- Faiz Mohammed Ahmed Al Kandari was listed as one of the captives who "The military alleges ... are members of Al Qaeda."
- Faiz Mohammed Ahmed Al Kandari was listed as one of the captives who "The military alleges ... traveled to Afghanistan for jihad."
- Faiz Mohammed Ahmed Al Kandari was listed as one of the captives who "The military alleges that the following detainees stayed in Al Qaeda, Taliban or other guest- or safehouses."
- Faiz Mohammed Ahmed Al Kandari was listed as one of the captives who "The military alleges ... took military or terrorist training in Afghanistan."
- Faiz Mohammed Ahmed Al Kandari was listed as one of the captives who "The military alleges ... were at Tora Bora."
- Faiz Mohammed Ahmed Al Kandari was listed as one of the captives whose "names or aliases were found on material seized in raids on Al Qaeda safehouses and facilities."
- Faiz Mohammed Ahmed Al Kandari was listed as one of the captives who was a member of the "al Qaeda leadership cadre".
- Faiz Mohammed Ahmed Al Kandari was listed as one of the captives "currently at Guantánamo who have been charged before military commissions and are alleged Al Qaeda leaders."

== Hearsay evidence ==
Lawyers for two Guantanamo detainees organized a study entitled, No-hearing hearings, which cited as an example of a detainee for whom all the evidence against him was "hearsay evidence".

The study quoted the Tribunal's legal advisor:

"Indeed, the evidence considered persuasive by the Tribunal is

made up almost entirely of hearsay evidence recorded by unidentified individuals with no first hand knowledge of the events they describe."

The study commented:

"Outside of the CSRT process, this type of evidence is more commonly referred to as 'rumor'."

=== Comment from his lawyer Lieutenant Colonel Barry D. Wingard ===
Lieutenant Colonel Barry Wingard lead attorney from the Office of Military Commissions, published an article about citing hearsey evidence against his client. Lieutenant Colonel Wingard said "Vague charges made it difficult to defend his client after he was assigned in October to represent a Kuwaiti named Fayiz". In trying to prepare his case, Lieutenant Colonel Wingard said:

"There simply is no evidence other than he is a Muslim in Afghanistan at the wrong time, other than double and triple hearsay statements, something i have never seen as justification for incarceration, let alone eight years."

== Torture during imprisonment ==
Lieutenant Colonel Barry Wingard and Faiz Mohammed Ahmed Al Kandari, pertaining to the harsh treatment and enhanced interrogation techniques that Faiz was continually subjected to. The abuse included sleep deprivation, physical abuse, being placed in stress position, sexual humiliation, and the use of extreme temperature, loud music and dogs.

Ask about the alleged mistreatment his mother who has not seen her son for 10 years his mother said:

"What do I feel? You know a mother's heart. I cry all the time and I never sleep at night."

In November 2011 Wingard expressed as well outrage over a propaganda video that the DOD had published.

"My first thought was that there is no way the United States government sank so low as to show my client to the world, caged like a circus animal."

Speaking while on a hunger strike in protest against his indefinite detention, Faiz said:

"Respect us or kill us. It is your choice. The US must take off its mask and kill us."

== Habeas Corpus ==
In a recently conducted interview with TPMmuckraker, Mr. David Cynamon—a lawyer for four Kuwaiti Gitmo detainees who are bringing habeas corpus claims against the government.

"The Department of Justice has been doing everything in its power to delay and obstruct these cases," said Cynamon

Cynamon's clients were picked up in the Afghanistan-Pakistan region in the period after the 2001 U.S invasion of Afghanistan.

"They're not doing anything to move the case along, and doing everything to avoid it."

Asked whether he had observed a shift of any kind in the government's approach since the Obama administration came into office, Cynamon flatly replied

"None whatsoever."

In even more Habeas Corpus news, a Federal Judge in Washington is on a tear against alleged bad lawyering by the Justice Department.

In a stinging order issued today, Judge Colleen Kollar-Kotelly refused to reconsider an earlier and similarly scathing order requiring the Justice Department to replace the government's attorney responding to challenges several Kuwaiti men have brought to their imprisonment at Guantanamo Bay. How mad was the judge? Her salvo Monday uses the words "shockingly revisionist," "flippant" and "disingenuous" to describe the government's handling of the litigation.

"The responsibility lies with the higher ups in the Justice Department who have been pursuing a very aggressive and very successful strategy of delay for months"

Attorney Matthew Maclean said.

"The Supreme Court said in June of last year we were entitled to prompt habeas corpus review. ... Last month, ... for the first time in seven years, [the prisoners] were allowed to see the accusations against them."

== US v. Al Kandari ==
On 22 October 2008, the Office of Military Commissions filed charges against him.

== Joint Review Task Force ==
On 21 January 2009, the day he was inaugurated, United States President Barack Obama issued three Executive orders related to the detention of individuals in Guantanamo. That new review system was composed of officials from six departments, where the OARDEC reviews were conducted entirely by the Department of Defense. When it reported back, a year later, the Joint Review Task Force classified some individuals as too dangerous to be transferred from Guantanamo, even though there was no evidence to justify laying charges against them. On 9 April 2013, that document was made public after a Freedom of Information Act request. Faiz Mohammed Ahmed Al Kandari was one of the 71 individuals deemed too innocent to charge, but too dangerous to release. Obama said those deemed too innocent to charge, but too dangerous to release would start to receive reviews from a Periodic Review Board.

== Periodic Review Board ==
The first review was not convened until November 20, 2013. The review was convened on 12 June 2014. Its recommendation that he should be released was made public on 14 July 2014.

== Renewed repatriation negotiations ==
In July 2013, Cynammon said the Obama administration was renewing repatriation negotiations after "years of radio silence".

In May 2015, Sheikh Mohammad Al-Khaled Al-Hamad Al-Sabah, Kuwaiti Minister of Interior, and Deputy Prime Minister traveled to Washington DC to renew Kuwait's interest in release.
