= Ab Kolok =

- Village
- Location in Afghanistan
- Coordinates: 37°3′35″N 66°2′36″E
- Country: Afghanistan
- Province: Jowzjan Province
- District: Mingajik District
- Time zone: + 4.30

Ab Kolok , also Ab Kuluk or Ab Kalak is a village in Mingajik District, Jowzjan Province, in northern Afghanistan. It lies northwest of the district capital of Mingajik and Harun-e Dovvom, northeast of Alam Lek and southeast of Seyyedabad, Jowzjan.

According to the entry in the Historical and political gazetteer of Afghanistan it is located northwest of Andkhui, on the road to Karkin and is about 3 miles north of Charshangho.

A small stream runs through the village running down from the village of Seyyedabad and merges with others south of the village before flowing through Aqcha.

== See also ==
- Jowzjan Province
