= Battle of Darzab (2018) =

Taliban-Islamic State battle in Afghanistan

Coordinates: 36°00′N 65°22′E

- Part of the War in Afghanistan (2001–2021); War on terror Islamic State–Taliban conflict
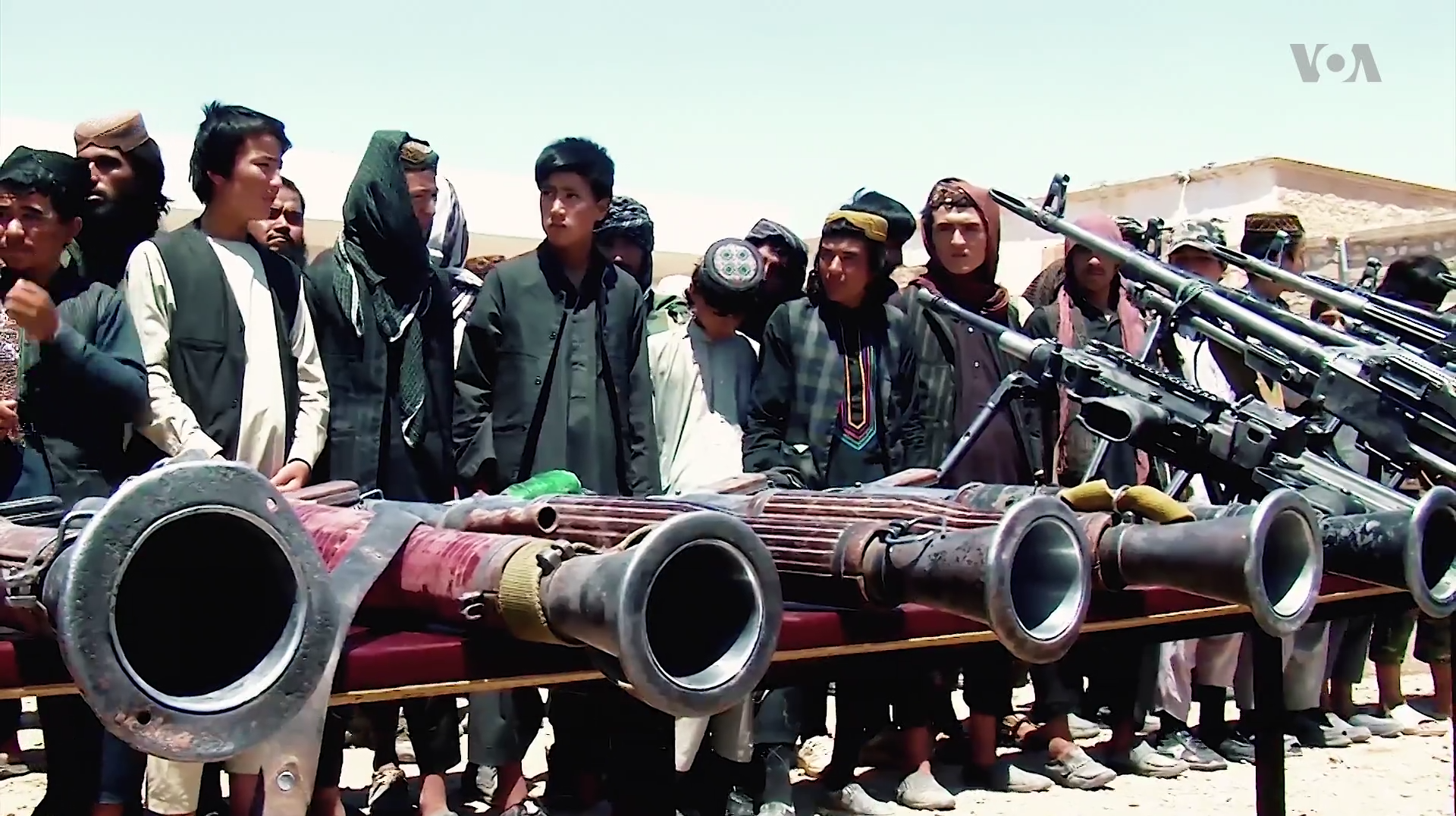
- Islamic State fighters who surrendered to the government at the battle's end
Date	12 July – 1 August 2018 (2 weeks and 6 days)
Location	Darzab District and surrounding districts, Afghanistan
Result	Major Taliban victory
Territorial changes	Taliban capture Darzab District

Belligerents
Taliban	Islamic State: Khorasan Province; Islamic Republic of Afghanistan (airstrikes on the Taliban, 30–31 July)

Commanders and leaders
Mullah Burjan (executed); Haji Shakir †	Maulawi Habibul Rahman (surrendered); Mufti Nemat (surrendered) "Sibghatullah" (surrendered); Haji Murad †

Units involved
Several contingents: Red Unit	Qari Hekmat's network: Foreign mujahideen; Islamic Movement of Uzbekistan forces

Strength
c. 2,000 (IS-KP claim)	600–700 (Afghan gov. estimate)

Casualties and losses
Disputed; probably heavy (Note: Accounts differ widely on how many losses the Taliban and IS-KP suffered during the campaign. By 18 July, the spokesman of Jowzjan Province's governor claimed that the Taliban had suffered 70 killed and 100 wounded, while IS-KP had suffered 52 killed, and 33 wounded overall. A local civilian, on the other side, claimed that 200 fighters had been killed on both sides on 17 July alone. Furthermore, the Taliban stated that they had killed 153, wounded over 100, and captured 134 IS-KP militants during their final operation of late July, while suffering just 17 dead and 13 wounded. In contrast, IS-KP leader Mufti Nemat claimed that just 40 of his followers had died during the campaign. According to FDD's Long War Journal, the claims and estimates of government representatives, Taliban, IS-KP, and local civilians are generally questionable. A Jamestown Foundation expert said that about 300 militants were killed overall during the Battle of Darzab.)	Disputed; probably heavy 245 surrender to Afghan government
- Several civilians killed, 3,500–7,000 displaced

The Battle of Darzab (12 July – 1 August 2018) was a major conflict between the Taliban and the Islamic State's Khorasan Province (ISIS–K) who fought each other over control of Jowzjan Province's Darzab District in Afghanistan. Following heavy clashes, ISIS–K was defeated, with most of the group's forces in Jowzjan Province killed or captured.

== Background ==
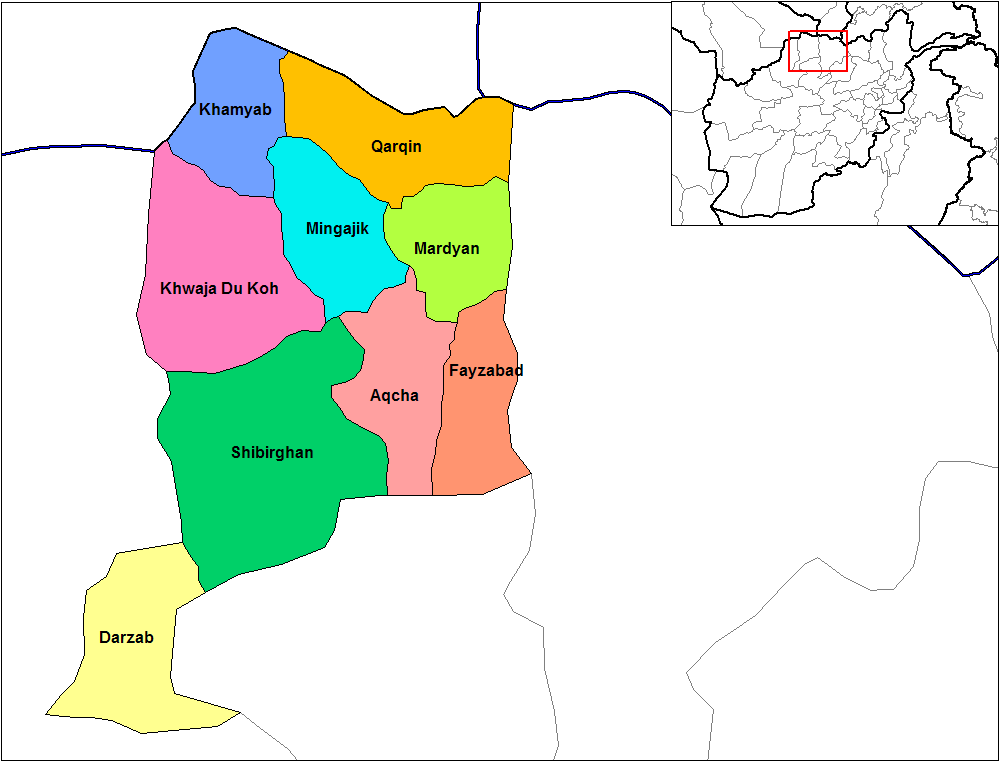
Map of Jozjan Province with Darzab District in light yellow

Despite both being opposed to the Islamic Republic of Afghanistan and its Western allies, the Taliban and the Islamic State are fierce rivals who have fought each other since 2015. The Islamic State's Afghan branch, namely the so-called "Khorasan Province" (often abbreviated ISIS-K or IS-KP), has extensively recruited disaffected ex-Taliban, and its mere presence threatens the Taliban's claim to be "the only legitimate opposition" in Afghanistan. One of the theaters where the two insurgent groups have repeatedly clashed is the country's north, most importantly the provinces of Jowzjan, Sar-e Pol, and Faryab.

The forces of IS-KP in northern Afghanistan consist of local Taliban defectors, and an extensive number of foreign mujahideen including Islamic Movement of Uzbekistan militants. The power of IS-KP in the north was further boosted by the defection of Uzbek Taliban commander Qari Hekmat and his followers. Hekmat became the leading commander of the Islamic State in northern Afghanistan, and used his large foreign network to recruit fighters from Central Asia and to smuggle them into Jowzjan, which had been a "major hub" for various insurgent groups even before the Taliban insurgency's beginning. In course of 2017, the Islamic State captured most of Darzab District in Jowzjan, and transformed it into its local stronghold. The Taliban subsequently launched at least three major offensives to oust IS-KP from Darzab, but all failed. Meanwhile, however, the US military and the Afghan government increasingly targeted Hekmat's network. Hekmat himself was killed in a US airstrike in April 2018, weakening IS-KP in the north. Hekmat was succeeded by Mawlavi Habibul Rahman, while Mawlavi's brother-in-law Mufti Nemat became second-in-command for Jowzjan Province. Despite Hekmat's death, several foreign fighters recruited by him remained in Darzab, including Uzbeks, Tajiks, Kazakhs, Kyrgyz, Indonesians, Chechens, Pakistanis, Turks, and French. On the 15th of April 2018, NATO’s Resolute Support mission revealed that Afghan Special Security Forces backed by U.S. special operations forces “eliminated” 22 Islamic State – Khorasan Province fighters in a nightime raid in Darzab district, Jowzjan province. The U.S. Defense Visual Information Distribution Service published video of the raid.

== The battle ==
Hostilities between IS-KP and the Taliban intensified in early July 2018, after Islamic State fighters seized a Taliban-held village in Darzab District, and beheaded ten Taliban members they had captured there. In response, Taliban forces launched counter-attacks against IS-KP positions in three districts of Jowzjan, including Darzab and Qush Tepa, on 12 July. Fighting also spread to Faryab and Sar-e Pol, where Islamic State militants killed Haji Shakir, the Taliban leader in Sancharak. On 15 July, IS-KP captured Taliban commander Mullah Burjan in the village of Bibi Maryam, Darzab. His execution three days later caused further intensification of the clashes. By 18 July, a Taliban source claimed that fighting in Darzab District was restricted to the villages of Aqsai, Qara Yorth, Qarighach, and Tash Jawaz, while IS-KP had been allegedly ousted from Kumarlik, Bibi Mariam and Aqblaq.

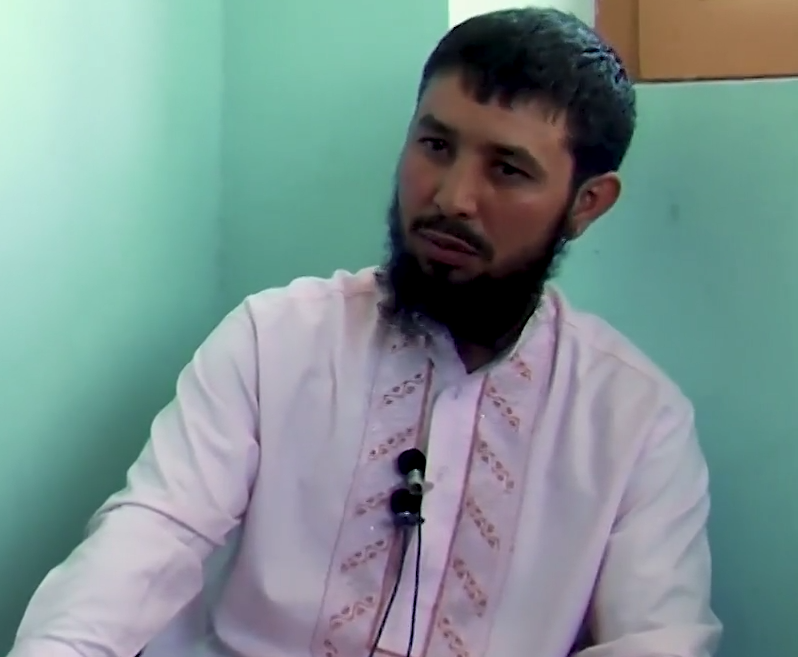
Mufti Nemat, second-in-command of IS-KP for Jowzjan Province

Sometime in mid-July, the Taliban launched a major offensive to fully evict IS-KP from Jowzjan Province. Islamic State commander Mawlavi Habibul Rahman later claimed that the Taliban had amassed 2,000 fighters in Jowzjan from various areas, including Helmand Province, for this operation. Employing their elite/special forces, the Red Unit, the Taliban attacked the Islamic State's stronghold of Darzab from three sides simultaneously. By this time, Darzab was held by about 600 to 700 IS-KP fighters according to estimates of the Afghan government. On 22 July, the Taliban overran IS-KP at the villages of Mughal and Sardara, Darzab, where they killed Haji Murad (also known as Haji Qumandan), the Islamic State's deputy commander for Jowzjan. In course of heavy combat, the Taliban reportedly inflicted hundreds of casualties on IS-KP, and captured much war materiel. By 20 July, 3,500 to 7,000 civilians had been displaced by the fighting.

By 30 July, IS-KP was reduced to just two villages in Darzab, whereupon its leaders Mawlavi Habibul Rahman and Mufti Nemat decided to contact the Afghan government; they subsequently agreed to surrender in exchange for protection from the Taliban. The Afghan Air Force then started to bombard Taliban positions to prevent them from capturing the remaining Islamic State forces and to ensure their surrender. Nemat later claimed that the Afghan National Army had also agreed to evacuate them with helicopters, though this came not to pass; instead, the Islamic State fighters had to reach government-held territories on foot. About 245 fighters, alongside their families, subsequently surrendered on 1 August, though some Islamic State fighters had disappeared during the retreat. Nemat later speculated that these militants had possibly defected to the Taliban. Among those who laid down arms were, besides Mawlavi and Nemat, another commander known as "Sibghatullah", about 100 child soldiers, and 25 to 30 foreign mujahideen.

== Aftermath ==
Voice of America report about the surrender

Following their surrender, the IS-KP fighters were transported with helicopters to Jowzjan Province's center Sheberghan. At Sheberghan, the Islamic State militants were treated more like guests than prisoners. This caused great resentment among civilians and soldiers alike, as the militants continued to call their guards, officials and journalists "infidels", and openly "boasted of engaging in acts of extreme barbarism [...], such as beheadings and the use of child soldiers", in interviews with the press. Mufti Nemat said that he considered to join pro-government forces with his followers; he had already fought for the government once in the past. Locals of Darzab, however, petitioned Jowzjan's governor to punish the militants for the war crimes they had committed. Several women accused Nemat and his troops of having raped them, while other locals said that the Islamic State fighters had executed over 100 civilians, including children, and had practised slavery in Darzab. The government was consequently widely criticised for "its unexplained action of providing asylum and protection to IS-K militants", prompting officials to declare that the Islamic State fighters would be brought to justice.

The controversial surrender proved to be a "propaganda bonanza" for the Taliban, who contrasted the government's lenient treatment of the IS-KP fighters with their own behavior. Taliban spokesman Zabiullah Mujahid declared that the IS-KP fighters who had been captured by the Taliban would be tried in military courts. The Taliban subsequently released a video showing over a dozen foreign Islamic State fighters who had been captured by them; this video circulated widely on Afghan media, pro-Taliban, and pro-al-Qaeda channels.

Despite claims by both government representatives and Taliban that this campaign had fully defeated the Islamic State in northern Afghanistan, IS-KP still held a few districts of Jowzjan, Sar-e Pol and Faryab.

=== US claims ===
The United States Department of Defense, in its 2018 quarterly report on Afghanistan, claimed the Taliban's victory over IS-KP in Jowzjan as its own. Early on, the US and Afghan government tried to label the surrender of IS-KP fighters to Afghan military as a "successful operation" conducted by the Afghan military. Although, IS-KP surrendered as a result of defeat at the hands of the Taliban.

FDD's Long War Journal claims that these attempts by the US military highlight just how desperate the US military was to report success in Afghanistan, and how infrequent those successes were in reality.

=== Fall of Chinese Camp ===
Chinese Camp was an Afghan National Army base which fell to Taliban control around the time when the Ghazni offensive was going on. Afghan army soldiers, who were deployed at Chinese Camp, heavily criticised the army and the government for abandoning them. They claimed that the Afghan military prioritised ferrying IS-KP prisoners in helicopters over using those helicopters to re-supply the camp. The soldiers asked whether those IS-KP militants were prisoners or honoured guests of the government.
