= Nemat (militant) =

Afghan militant

Mufti Nemat نعمت Mullah
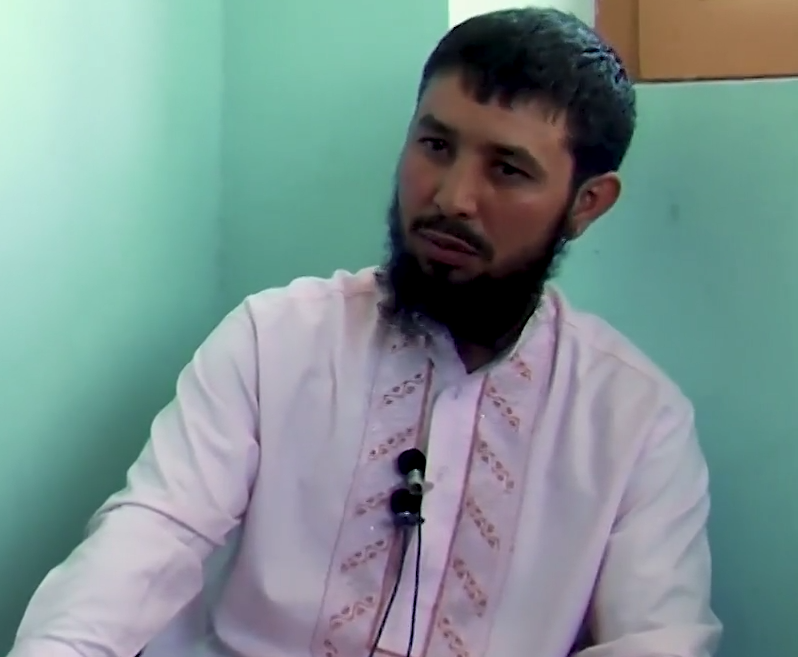
- Mufti Nemat in 2018
- Born: Afghanistan
- Relatives: Mawlavi Habibul Rahman (brother-in-law)
- Military career
- Allegiance: Taliban (until 2014); Islamic State's Khorasan Province (2016–18)
- Service years: ?–2014; 2016–18
- Rank: Head of the military committee of Darzab and Qush Tepa, shadow governor of Jowzjan Province (Taliban); Second-in-command for Jowzjan Province (Islamic State)
- Conflicts: War in Afghanistan: Battle of Darzab (2017); Battle of Darzab (2018)
- Other work: Salafist cleric and religious teacher

Mufti Nemat, also known as Mufti Nematullah Qaweem (Persian: نعمت الله قاویم) or Mullah Nemat Mufti, is an Afghan militant and Salafist cleric who served as a field commander for the Taliban and later the Islamic State's Khorasan Province (ISIL-K) in northern Afghanistan, particularly Jowzjan Province. While waging an insurgency against the Afghan government, he has been accused of committing several war crimes.

== Biography ==
=== Early life and service with the Taliban ===
Nemat initially was a field commander of the Taliban (flag pictured), but was expelled from the movement in 2014.

Nemat, an ethnic Uzbek, originally was a religious teacher and mufti in First Vice President Abdul Rashid Dostum's home village in Jowzjan Province. At some point, Nemat became a Salafist and joined the Taliban, forming a small private army to fight for Qush Tepa District. He eventually rose to head of the Taliban military committee for the districts of Darzab and Qush Tepa in Jowzjan, and was considered to be an "important" field commander for the insurgents. It is possible that Nemat took part in "Operation Badr", a major Taliban offensive in northern Afghanistan in 2011. (Note: Afghan authorities claimed that "Mawlawi Nematullah", one of "two top Taliban leaders for Jawzjan", fought at the village of al Malik in Qush Tepa from 9 and 11 April 2011. The provincial authorities argued that the man in question was killed in the fighting, but Afghan government claims about Taliban deaths are often unreliable.) According to Pajhwok Afghan News, he even served as shadow governor of Jowzjan at some point, and was addressed with the honorific title "Maulvi". Despite this, Nemat was also increasingly criticised by his superiors for various irregularities, including abuse of authority, harassment and torture of locals over taxation, and corruption. While visiting Pakistan in 2013, Nemat was arrested by the Taliban over these issues, and expelled from the rebel movement in 2014.

In response, Nemat made a deal with Vice President Dostum in December 2014, and officially surrendered to the Afghan government with 220 of his followers in February 2015. He and his fighters were promised salaries for six months, and help in finding new civilian jobs. For the next two years, he stayed in Sheberghan, hoping to gain an appointment as commander in the pro-government militias. Nemat also started a Salafi madrasa called E'ya-ye Sunnat ("Rehabilitation of the Sunnah"), and organized classes for male and female students. His Salafist views aroused great opposition from the local religious establishment of Hanafi clerics, resulting in several public debates between Nemat and a number of his opponents. State authorities eventually shut down his madrasa and banned him from teaching in Jowzjan Province in November 2016. Believing that neither Dostum nor the rest of government had upheld their part of the agreement with him, Nemat consequently resumed his insurgency. He joined forces with Qari Hekmat, the leader of the region's branch of ISIL's Khorasan Province. Though Nemat later argued that his decision to join ISIL-K stemmed from ideological conviction, an expert of the Afghanistan Analysts Network said that he had probably been more motivated by "power-saving opportunism".

=== ISIL-K commander ===
Commanding about 80 fighters, Nemat became the commander for all ISIL-K forces in Darzab's Sar Dara area, and was also appointed by Hekmat as head of ISIL-K's local military court. In course of 2017, ISIL-K grew increasingly powerful in northern Afghanistan, and almost completely captured Darzab District from the Taliban and government forces, including Dostum's militias, in April. At the time, government officials regarded Nemat as one of the most important Islamic State commanders, stating that "he knows the Darzab District and the area very well; he is a very dangerous guy". Darzab consequently became the group's stronghold, though it repeatedly attempted to expand into other areas. Hekmat was killed by a US airstrike in April 2018, and the other northern ISIL-K commanders consequently elected Mawlavi Habibul Rahman, Nemat's brother-in-law, as their new leader. An expert speculated that Nemat might have played an important role in the succession; in any case, he became ISIL-K's second-in-command for Jowzjan Province after Mawlavi Habibul Rahman's appointment. While serving with ISIL-K, Nemat reportedly committed numerous war crimes.

==== Surrender ====
Voice of America report about the surrender, including an interview with Mufti Nemat

Despite their military successes in 2017, ISIL-K remained threatened by the Taliban in northern Afghanistan, as the latter repeatedly attempted to oust the Islamic State militants from Darzab. A major Taliban offensive in July 2018 eventually overwhelmed ISIL-K's defenses and brought the group's northern branch to the brink of destruction. The Taliban rejected offers for a ceasefire, and demanded that Nemat, alongside Mawlavi Habibul Rahman and Sibghatullah, ISIL-K's local head of finances be handed over to them. At this point, the northern ISIL-K branch split, with a substantial number of fighters defecting to the Taliban, while the three commanders and their loyalists decided to contact the Afghan government and offered their surrender in exchange for protection from the Taliban. Nemat and his fellow fighters, along with their families, consequently fled to government lines in the night, protected by Commandos and the Afghan Air Force.

Following his surrender, the ISIL-K militants were transported to Sheberghan, where they were treated rather well despite the protests of many local civilians and soldiers. Nemat subsequently gave several interviews to the press, declaring that "fake news" were responsible for the Islamic State's bad reputation. He claimed that he and his followers had only launched an insurgency because they were met with hostility by the "whole world", and that he wanted people to accept ISIL's ideology "with their hearts, not by force". Regarding his future, Nemat said that the "Afghan government must save my life and provide me with security" as it promised to do so before the surrender, and that he was not guilty of any crimes. Despite these claims, several women had previously accused him of having abducted and raped them. This was notable, as it was "the first time Afghan women have come forward and accused IS fighters of rape". Rape victims in Afghanistan usually do not speak out due to rape being a taboo topic in the country's society. Other civilians accused ISIL-K of having executed over one hundred civilians, including children, and of practising slavery in Darzab. The government was widely criticised for "its unexplained action of providing asylum and protection to IS-K militants", prompting officials to declare that the Islamic State fighters would be brought to justice.
