= Islamic State–Taliban conflict =

2015–present armed conflict in Afghanistan

- Part of the Afghan conflict, War in Afghanistan, War against the Islamic State, war on terror, and al-Qaeda–Islamic State conflict
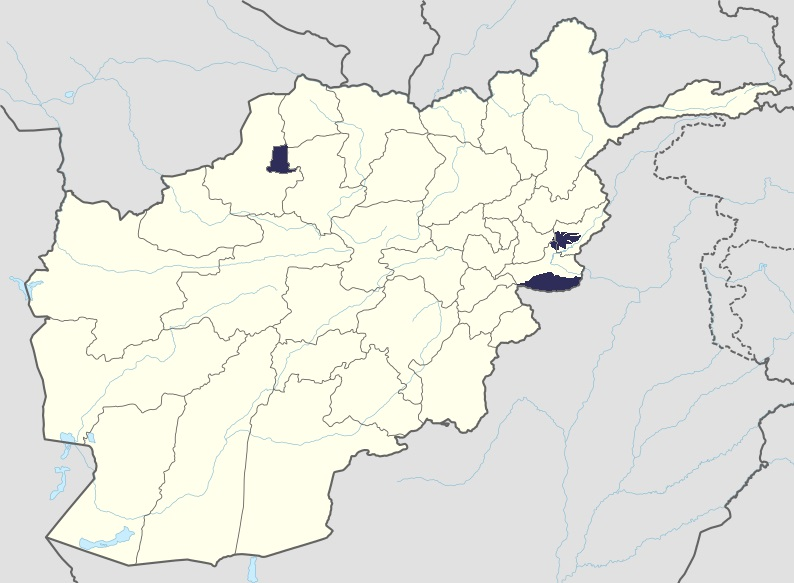
- Territory of the Islamic State – Khorasan Province at its peak
Date	2 February 2015 – present (11 years, 9 months and 6 days)
Location	Afghanistan (mainly Nangarhar, Kunar and Jowzjan provinces), small-scale clashes in Khyber Pakhtunkwa, Pakistan
Status	Ongoing: Initial Taliban victories in the battles of Darzab and Nangarhar; Collapse of the Islamic State stronghold in eastern Afghanistan in 2019; Taliban captures all of the former Islamic Republic territory in 2021; IS-KP regains strength in eastern Afghanistan following Taliban takeover; IS-KP rebellion in eastern Afghanistan suppressed; Continued IS-KP guerilla warfare and insurgent attacks, including cross-border attacks into Pakistan

Belligerents
Afghanistan (since 2021); Taliban; (Taliban) Haqqani network; Al-Qaeda; IMU (pro-Taliban & anti-IS factions); Turkistan Islamic Party; Pakistani Taliban	Islamic State; IS central command; Khorasan Province; Dadullah Front (until 2016); Fidai Mahaz (until 2021); IMU (until 2023)

Commanders and leaders
(Afghanistan) Hibatullah Akhundzada; (Afghanistan) Mullah Yaqoob; (Afghanistan) Siraj Haqqani; (Afghanistan) Abdul Ghani Baradar; (Afghanistan) Fasihuddin Fitrat; (Afghanistan) Mohammad Bashir; (Afghanistan) Neda Mohammad; Formerly: (Afghanistan) Akhtar Mansour X; Abdul Ghani †; (Afghanistan) Haji Shakir †; (Afghanistan) Hamdullah Mukhlis †; Sheikh Rahimullah Haqqani †; (Afghanistan) Mujib Rahman Ansari †; (Afghanistan) Abdulhaq Abu Omar †; (Afghanistan) Mohammad Dawood Muzamil †; (Afghanistan) Nisar Ahmad Ahmadi †	Shahab al-Muhajir; Ismatullah Khalozai; Maulawi Rajab; Formerly: Hafiz Saeed Khan †; Abdul Haseeb Logari †; Abu Sayed †; Abu Saad Erhabi †; Abdul Rauf Aliza †; Abdullah Orokzai (POW); Nemat (surrendered); Qari Hekmat †; Farooq Bengalzai †; Haji Qomandan †; Mansoor Dadullah †; Abdul Manan Niazi †; Nangialai Khan †; Maulawi Habib Ur Rehman (surrendered); Aziz Azam †; Muhammad Rasul (surrendered); Qari Fateh †

Units involved
Afghan Armed Forces; Afghan Army; Red Unit; Badri 313 Battalion; Afghan Air Force; Ministry of Defense; General Directorate of Intelligence; Pro-Taliban militias	Military of the Islamic State; IMU (factions); Taliban defectors; Former Afghan soldiers (2021–); Former NDS personnel (2021–)

Strength
Afghanistan; 1,000 special forces (2015); 70,000–75,000 fighters (2021)	IS–KP and allies; 1,000–8,500 fighters (2016) (Note: Estimates of IS-K strength in 2016 varied widely. The United States Armed Forces estimated between 1,000 and 3,000, whereas Afghan officials judged IS-K to have around 3,000 fighters. Journalists Catherine Philip and David Charter stated that it were about 3,000 to 4,000. One analyst put IS-K's strength at up to 8,500 if one included "support elements".); 2,000–3,500 fighters (2021); HCIEA: 3,000–3,500

Casualties and losses
- 5,321 civilian deaths (2015–2023)

The Islamic State is waging an ongoing insurgency against the Taliban regime in Afghanistan. The conflict initially began when both operated as rival insurgent groups in Nangarhar; since the formation of the Taliban's state in 2021, IS members have enacted a campaign of terrorism targeting both civilians and assassinating Taliban members using hit-and-run tactics. The group have also caused incidents and attacks across the border in Pakistan.

The conflict began in 2015 following the creation of the Islamic State – Khorasan Province (IS-KP), a regional branch of the Islamic State. IS-KP and the Taliban started to clash over control of territory during the war in Afghanistan (2001–2021), mostly in eastern Afghanistan but also through cells in the north-west and south-west. The Haqqani network, al-Qaeda and others supported the Taliban, while IS was supported by the Mullah Dadullah Front and the pro-ISIS faction of the Islamic Movement of Uzbekistan. IS-KP had lost territory to both the Taliban and the former republican government, with American support, by 2020. Following the Taliban capture of Kabul in 2021, IS-KP have continued its insurgent attacks against the new Taliban regime.

As of October 2024 IS-KP is the largest and most powerful of the terror groups active in Afghanistan, with the Taliban appearing to view IS-KP as the primary threat to their rule. As of June 2026, BBC Monitoring reported that IS-KP is severely crippled and only a "shadow of its former self.'

== Background ==
During the original stint in power of the Islamic Emirate of Afghanistan in the late 1990s, the ruling Taliban had pursued a policy of suppressing Salafism; motivated by strict Deobandi tenets. During this period, the main issue of Salafist scholars was that Taliban was led by Maturidi Sufis. As a result of the unofficial Taliban bans on Ahl-i Hadith during the 1996–2001 era, several Salafis had shifted to Peshawar. However, after the US-led invasion of Afghanistan in 2001, Taliban and Ahl-i Hadith allied to wage a common Jihad to resist the invasion. The Afghan Salafists decided to put aside their differences with the Taliban to join them in the "greater jihad" against the United States. Several Arab Salafis in Al-Qaeda rank and file would mediate the disputes between Afghan Salafists and Taliban; enabling them to unify for the more important religious duty of fighting against the U.S and its allies in Afghanistan. Many Salafi commanders and Ahl-i Hadith organisations participated in the Taliban insurgency (2001–2021) under Afghan Taliban's command.

During the Taliban insurgency, in January 2015, IS established itself in Khorasan and formed IS-K. The main objective of IS-K was to occupy the land of Khorasan, which includes the country of Afghanistan. Even though the initial IS-K was formed by Taliban as well as Tehrik-i-Taliban Pakistan (TTP) defectors and thus ideologically similar, it became dominated by Salafists. The disgruntled members of TTP would establish IS-KP and shifted to the Nangarhar province. After its founding Pakistani leaders who defected from TTP were killed in US drone strikes, Afghan Salafists took charge of TTP. The conflict escalated when militants affiliated with IS-KP killed Abdul Ghani, a senior Taliban commander in Logar Province on 2 February 2015.

The emergence of IS-K provided militant Afghan Salafists with an opportunity to set up a rival force, although Salafist support for the group waned as it proved ideologically "too extreme and brutal" for most Afghan Salafis. As a result, the majority of Afghan Salafis have remained supportive of the Taliban. In March 2020, major Pashtun Ahl-i Hadith ulema convened in Peshawar under the leadership of Shaikh Abdul Aziz Nooristani and Haji Hayatullah to pledge Bay'ah (oath of loyalty) to the Taliban and publicly condemn IS-K. The scholars also requested protection from the Afghan Taliban for the Ahl-i Hadith community.

After Taliban victory in the War in Afghanistan and restoration of the Islamic Emirate, hundreds of Ahl-i Hadith ulema would gather to announce their Bay'ah (pledge of allegiance) to the Islamic Emirate of Afghanistan. Numerous Ahl-i Hadith clerics and their representatives held gatherings across various provinces of Afghanistan to re-affirm their backing of the Taliban and officially declare their support to the Taliban crackdown on IS-K. Several members of the Afghan intelligence agency and the Afghan national army have also joined the Islamic State – Khorasan Province. The High Council of the Islamic Emirate of Afghanistan, previously a breakaway Taliban faction, announced that they have pledged allegiance to the Taliban and will dissolve. In February 2022, Pakistani officials acknowledged that ongoing violence was destabilizing the region.

=== Opposing forces ===
By 2016 IS-K mostly consisted of eastern Afghans, Pakistanis, and foreign fighters from Central Asia. The latter were mainly former members of the Islamic Jihad Union and the Turkistan Islamic Party. In addition, there were a small number of Arabs. Throughout its existence, IS-K has operated in a very limited area, mainly concentrated in select provinces in eastern Afghanistan, most importantly Nangarhar and Kunar. By 2016, it had appointed shadow governors in other regions as well, but not exerted much influence outside its traditional bases. The group is known to receive support by the Islamic State's central command in form of money and combat trainers from Iraq and Syria. IS-K's combat strength has fluctuated greatly over the years, but has mostly remained in the low thousands.

== During the Taliban insurgency ==
=== 2015 ===
On 2 February militants affiliated with IS-K killed Abdul Ghani, a Taliban commander, in Logar province.

On 26 May Asif Nang, governor of Farah province, said the Taliban have been fighting against IS militants for the past three days in Farah province. The clash left ten Taliban and 15 IS militants dead.

In May IS-K militants captured Maulvi Abbas, a Taliban commander who was leading a small squad of insurgent fighters in Nangarhar province.

In June IS-K militants beheaded ten Taliban fighters who were fleeing an Afghan military offensive according to a spokesman of Afghan army corps responsible for the region.

On 9 November fighting had broken out between different Taliban factions in the Zabul Province of Afghanistan. Fighters loyal to the new Taliban leader Akhtar Mansour began to fight a pro-IS faction, led by Mullah Mansoor Dadullah. According to Afghan security and local officials, Akhtar Mansour had sent as many as 450 Taliban fighters to crush Mullah Mansoor and Islamic State elements in Zabul. Dadullah's faction received support from IS during the clashes, and IS fighters also joined in on the fighting alongside Dadullah, including foreign fighters from Chechnya and Uzbekistan. Dadullah and IS were eventually defeated by Mansour's forces. Hajji Momand Nasratyar, the district governor of Arghandab, said the fighting took place in three districts of Zabul province and 86 IS militants and 26 Taliban fighters were killed in the clash. Taliban also reported to have killed several IS militants who were responsible for beheading of seven Hazara civilians a few days back.

Hajji Atta Jan, the Zabul provincial council chief, said the offensive by Mullah Mansour's fighters was so intense, that at least three Islamic State commanders, all of them ethnic Uzbeks, had surrendered. They were also asking others IS militants to do the same. Radio Free Europe/Radio Liberty, while quoting sources from Southern Afghanistan, reported that some 70 IS militants were also captured in the clash by the Taliban.

On 13 November Ghulam Jelani Farahi, an Afghan police chief, said that Mullah Mansoor Dadullah was killed in a clash with Taliban.

=== 2016 ===
In January hundreds of Taliban fighters launched an assault against IS bases in eastern Afghanistan. Taliban fighters were successful in capturing two districts from IS in eastern Afghanistan, but it failed to drive the group out of their stronghold in the Nazyan District in Nangarhar province. Ataullah Khogyani, a spokesman for the provincial governor, said that 26 IS militants and five Taliban fighters were killed in the clashes in Nangarhar.

On 2 February US carried out airstrikes targeting IS radio station in eastern Afghanistan. The strike destroyed the radio station and killed 29 IS militants.

In March Taliban factions led by Muhammad Rasul and opposed to Mansoor, began to fight against his loyalists in the group. During the fighting, dozens were reported killed.

On 26 April Hazrat Hussain Mashriqwal, a provincial police spokesman, said that ten IS militants, including an IS commander, and six Taliban fighters were killed in a clash in Nangarhar. Fifteen IS militants and four Taliban fighters were also wounded during the same clash according to the spokesman.

On 19 May local government officials reported that a clash took place between IS and Taliban in Achin and Khogyani District of Nangarhar province. Fifteen IS militants and three Taliban fighters were killed in Achin district, and the remaining were killed in Khogyani. Four Taliban commanders were also among the dead.

On 13 August US defence officials said that ISIL's top leader, Hafiz Saeed Khan, was killed in a drone strike on 26 July in Nangarhar province.

On 30 October Ajmal Zahid, a governor of Golestan district, said that ISIL's commander, Abdul Razaq Mehdi, was killed by Taliban fighters in Farah province.

=== 2017 ===
On 13 April 2017 the United States dropped the largest non-nuclear bomb, known as the GBU-43/B Massive Ordnance Air Blast (MOAB) Mother of All Bombs near Momand village upon a Nangahar's Achin District village in eastern Afghanistan to destroy tunnel complexes used by the Islamic State of Iraq and the Levant – Khorasan Province (ISIL-KP or ISIS–K). The Guardian reported that following the strike, US and Afghan forces conducted clearing operations and airstrikes in the area and assessed the damage.

On 26 April a fight occurred after IS captured three drug dealers who were involved in selling opium for the Taliban in Jowzjan Province. An Afghan National Police spokesman stated that the Taliban attacked IS in response, saying "The clashes erupted when group of armed Taliban attacked Daesh militants [to secure] the release of three drug smugglers who came here to pay 10 million afghanis [$14,780] to the Taliban for a deal." The Taliban's spokesman, Zabihullah Mujahid had also confirmed clashes were ongoing with IS at the time, without providing details on the nature of the fight or reasons. Mohammad Reza Ghafori, a spokesman for the provincial governor, said that the clashes between Taliban and IS-K had left 76 Taliban and 15 IS militants dead. IS militants also seized two districts from the Taliban, according to the spokesman.

On 24 May a clash between the Taliban and IS occurred, and at that time, it had reportedly been the largest clash between the two with 22 casualties, 13 of which were IS fighters, and nine Taliban fighters, according to a Taliban official. The clashes occurred near Iran's border with Afghanistan. The Taliban had attacked an IS camp in the area, an IS commander, who was formerly a Taliban member, said that there was an agreement between the Taliban and IS not to attack each other until there was a dialogue. The commander claimed that the Taliban had violated the agreement and attacked the IS camp. The IS commander also claimed the attack was coordinated with the Iranian military, and that there were Iranians filming dead IS fighters. The Taliban splinter faction Fidai Mahaz has also criticized the Taliban for its relationship with Iran. Days before the battle, the Taliban reportedly met with Iranian officials to discuss regional issues. A spokesman for Fidai Mahaz claimed the meeting was held at the request of the Taliban, as it was weary of the expansion of IS in the country, which also concerned the Iranian government. The spokesman also said that the Taliban received US$3 million in cash, 3,000 arms, 40 trucks, and the ammunition from Iran's intelligence services, to fight IS near the Iranian border, although a Taliban spokesman denied the allegations.

On 27 November Taliban executed one of its senior commanders for colluding with IS. A week before, IS fighters were mass executed by their fellow militants in Achin district, according to a provincial government spokesman. However, the spokesman did not provide any additional detail, and neither did IS release any official statement on killing its own members.

=== 2018 ===
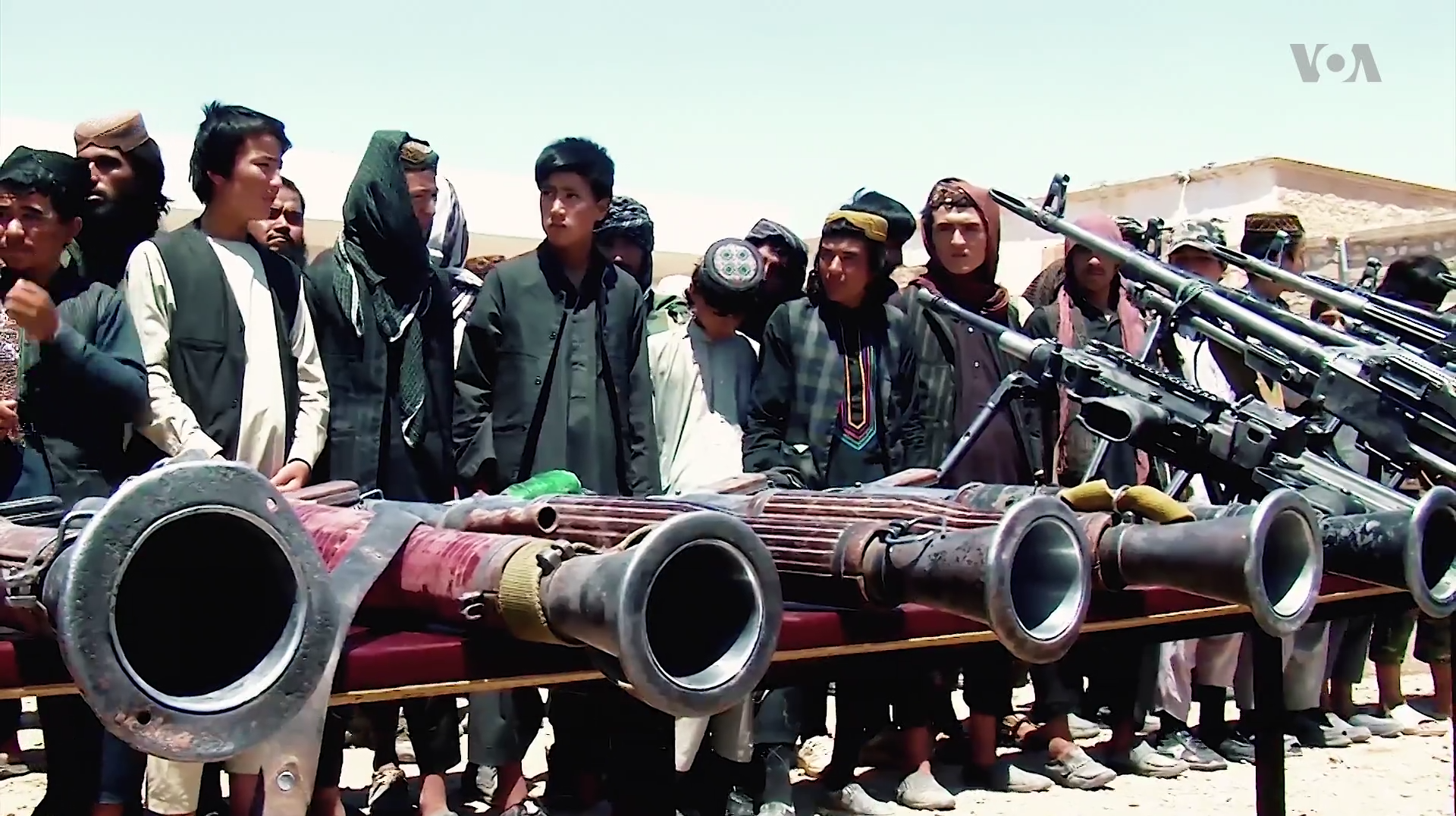
Surrendered Islamic State fighters after the Battle of Darzab.

On 20 June after the talks between the Russian government and the Taliban, US assistant secretary of state Alice Wells condemned the Russian government's position on the Taliban that included backing for the group against IS, stating it gave the Taliban legitimacy and challenged the recognized Afghan government.

In July the Taliban launched an offensive against IS in the Jowzjan province. According to a surrendered IS commander, the Taliban had amassed 2,000 fighters for the offensive against IS. The fighters from the Islamic Movement of Uzbekistan, who had sworn allegiance to IS, were also present fighting alongside IS against the Taliban. During the fighting, 3,500 to 7,000 civilians were displaced. By the end of July, IS's hold in the region was reduced to two villages, all thanks to the Taliban's campaign. In response, they requested support from the Afghan government, and also agreed to put down their arms in exchange for protection from the Taliban. The Afghan Air Force later carried out airstrikes against the Taliban in exchange for IS's surrender in the region. The agreement between the Afghan government and IS created controversy afterwards. On 17 July, IS militants killed 15 Taliban militants and injured five others during a raid on a house belonging to a Taliban commander in Sar-e Pol. Abdul Qayuom Baqizoi, the police chief of Sar-e Pol, told Associated Press that Taliban and IS fighters have been fighting each other in Jowzjan and Sar-e Pol for more than two months, killing hundreds on both sides.

In August Maulawi Habib Ur Rehman, together with 152 militants, surrendered to the 209th Shaheen Corps of the Afghan Military in Jawzjan province. During the negotiations between the US government and the Taliban in Doha, the Taliban had requested that the US ends airstrikes on the Taliban, as well as provide support to the group to fight IS.

In December the press office of 201 Seylab Division announced that Daesh spokesman Sultan Aziz Azam has been killed in an airstrike by foreign forces in Vazirtangi area, Khogyani District, Nangarhar Province.

=== 2019 ===
Map showing the war as of January 2019 Under control of the Afghan Government, NATO, and Allies Under control of the Taliban, Al-Qaeda, and Allies Under control of the Islamic State of Iraq and the Levant (ISIL) and Allies Under control of the Pakistani Army

On 22 June, clashes were reported in Kunar between the Taliban and IS, by an Afghan government official. The official also claimed that the Afghan military had killed some IS fighters in the area, and that the Taliban was active in the area as well.

On 29 June IS released photos of weapons captured from the Taliban. On the same day, IS published a video of its fighters renewing their Bayah to Abu Bakr al-Baghdadi. In the video, fighters criticized the Taliban for engaging in peace talks and called upon Taliban fighters to join IS.

On 1 August the Amaq News Agency claimed that IS had killed five Taliban members during clashes in Kunar.

On 1 October IS claimed to have killed and wounded 20 Taliban fighters in Tora Bora.

=== 2020 ===
In March 2020 the Afghan Salafist Council under its emir, Shaikh Abdul Aziz Nooristani, met with Taliban leaders and pledged loyalty to their movement. Salafists had previously provided crucial support to IS-K, but recognized that the latter's position had greatly declined after its defeats in Nangarhar and Kunar. The Salafist Council, represented by 32 scholars and military leaders, stated that they were in no way loyal to IS-K, and wanted to be left out of the Islamic State–Taliban conflict. The Taliban leadership accepted the pledge of loyalty, exploiting it in its propaganda.

In October 2020 former Politico reporter Wesley Morgan revealed that United States special operations forces, longtime foes of the Taliban, had been conducting drone strikes against IS-K to give the Taliban an advantage in the field. According to Morgan, the operators were jokingly referred to as the "Taliban Air Force" and instead of communicating directly with Taliban commanders, they would monitor Taliban communications and decide when was the best time to strike. On 10 December 2020, General Kenneth McKenzie Jr., head of US Central Command, confirmed that the US had assisted the Taliban via opportunistic drone strikes, saying that they did not coordinate operations with the Taliban, but took advantage of them fighting a "common enemy" to conduct their own operations. Gen. McKenzie said the strikes occurred several months prior when IS-K was holding ground in Nangarhar Province and elsewhere in eastern Afghanistan.

== After the Taliban's takeover of Afghanistan ==
=== Renewed Islamic State attacks and anti-Salafist purge ===
The Taliban finally succeeded in taking over Afghanistan from the Islamic Republic during a large-scale offensive in summer 2021. Kabul fell on 15 August 2021, prompting the leaders of the IS-K to denounce the Taliban takeover of Afghanistan. The Taliban immediately moved to contain or purge potential opponents, including Islamic State supporters and Salafists. Across the country, the Taliban ordered the closure of Salafist mosques and seminaries, and tried to arrest prominent Salafist scholars, prompting many to go-into-hiding. Among those targeted by the new Taliban authorities were Salafi clerics whom had previously publicly opposed IS-K. Researcher Abdul Sayed argued that the purge was probably organized by hardline anti-Salafist elements within the Taliban, but more motivated by long-time resentment than fears about Salafi support for a future IS-K insurgency. On 16 August, the Taliban claimed to have killed around 150 IS-K fighters, including its former chief, Abu Umar Khurasani, whilst prisoners were being released from a jail in Kabul. However, many IS-K militants were able to rejoin their IS-K ranks after a string of prison-breaks across the country were organized by the Taliban.

On 26 August 2021, a suicide bombing and a mass shooting occurred near Abbey Gate at Hamid Karzai International Airport in Kabul. The attack began mere hours after the US State Department advised Americans outside the airport to leave due to terrorism threats. At least 185 people were killed in these attacks, including 13 US service members. The Taliban condemned the attack, saying "evil circles will be strictly stopped". The Taliban, later, announced that they would take every possible measure to capture IS-KP leader Shahab al-Muhajir. The same day, Saifullah Mohammed (Taliban's CID chief) told The Times that they had captured six militants belonging to IS-K, following a gun battle in west Kabul.

Taliban militants kidnapped the influential Salafi cleric Mullah Abu Obaidullah Mutawakil on 28 August; he was "brutal[ly]" murdered one week later. Taliban spokesman Zabiullah Mujahid denied the Taliban's role in the killing, but also did not condemn the act. Even though Mutawakil was described as an IS-K sympathiser, and a large number of his students were a part of IS-K, he had not officially backed the Islamic State. IS-K did not offer prayers for him after his demise, stating that he had "not been loyal" to the Islamic State. On 9 November 2021, Reuters journalist James MacKenzie stated that "frequent, smaller atrocities" in the conflict are "less commonly reported." Aside from the ISIS stronghold of Nangarhar, other affected areas include Ghazni in central Afghanistan, Herat in the west, Balkh in the north, and Paktia, Paktika and Khost in the southeast.

=== Islamic State insurgency ===
On 6 September Neda Mohammad, a Taliban governor for Nangarhar province, vowed to continue fighting IS-K militants. Nangarhar province is a stronghold of IS-K and the governor says that since taking over Nangarhar, his forces had arrested 70–80 suspected militants belonging to IS-K in Nangarhar province.

On 8 September Taliban killed Farooq Bengalzai, an ISIS–K head for a Pakistan's province, in Nimroz, Afghanistan.

On 18 September seven people were killed when four bombs planted by suspected IS-KP members exploded in Jalalabad targeting Taliban patrols.

On 22 September two Taliban fighters and a civilian were killed by ISIL gunmen who attacked a checkpoint in Ghawchak district of Jalalabad, security sources and witnesses said.

On 1 October Taliban forces raided an ISIS–K base in the city of Charikar, north of Kabul. The Taliban claimed they had killed and arrested a number of ISIS–K members.

On 2 October suspected ISIS–K militants shot dead two Taliban fighters and two civilians in Jalalabad.

On three October an explosion at the entrance to the Eidgah Mosque in Kabul leaves at least five dead, where a memorial service was held for the mother of Taliban spokesman Zabihullah Mujahid. ISIS–K later claimed responsibility for the attack, claiming it killed Taliban militants.

On 4 October the Taliban says it has "destroyed an IS–K cell" in Kabul following yesterday's bombing at a mosque during the memorial for the mother of Taliban spokesman Zabihullah Mujahid. Mujahid says that a special Taliban unit carried out the operation and that the base was destroyed and everyone inside was killed.

On 6 October seven people, including at least one Taliban fighter, were killed in a grenade attack on a religious school in Khost. ISIS–K claimed responsibility for the attack.

On 7 October the Taliban announced that they had arrested four ISIS–K members after a raid in Paghman district, west of Kabul. On the same day, ISIS claimed responsibility for the capture and execution of a Taliban fighter in District 2 of Jalalabad.

On 8 October a Uyghur Islamic State militant, by the name of Muhammad al-Uyghuri killed 55 to 100 people and injured dozens more after launching a suicide bombing on a Shi'ite mosque in Kunduz.

On 9 October Taliban spokesman Suhail Shaheen announced that there would be no co-operation with the US to combat ISIS–K, saying that the Taliban are 'able to deal with ISIS independently'.

On 10 October ISIS–K claimed responsibility for the assassination of two Taliban fighters in District 7 of Jalalabad.

On 14 October, a bomb killed a Taliban police chief in Asadabad, capital of Kunar province, Afghanistan. They also claim that eleven people were injured, including four Taliban soldiers.

On 15 October a bomb explosion occurred in Kandahar at the Shia 'Imam Bargah mosque', killing at least 65 people and wounding at least 70 more. ISIS claimed responsibility for the attack.

On 20 October the Taliban announced they had arrested at least 250 ISIS–K operatives between mid-September and mid-October 2021.

On 23 October ISIS–K claimed responsibility for shooting two Taliban fighters dead in District 1 of Jalalabad city.

On 24 October a bomb attack in Afghanistan has left at least two civilians dead on Saturday, one being a child, and four wounded. The device placed on the road in eastern Afghanistan was aimed at a Taliban vehicle. On the same day, it was reported that ISIS–K had raised a flag in a village in Uruzgan Province and that the militants were distributing leaflets at mosques in nearby villages.

On 25 October 17 people were killed in clashes between gunmen and Taliban forces in Herat. On the same day it was announced that Tajikistan and China had reached an agreement for China to fund construction for a new Tajik military base and that Chinese forces can completely operate a military base near the Afghan border.

On 31 October at least a hundred IS militants reportedly surrendered to the Taliban security forces in Nangarhar province, as part of an operation to suppress the insurgent formation in the country.

In October a former Afghan national army officer, who recently joined ISIS–K ranks, was killed in clash with Taliban fighters. The former officer commanded the Afghan military's weapons and ammunition depot in Gardez before the Taliban takeover.

Since the Taliban takeover the violence in Nangahar province has escalated with near-daily attacks claimed by the Islamic State. The Taliban responded by deploying an additional 1,300 fighters in the province in the month of October with the aim to increase the number of operations conducted against the ISIS–K fighters in the province. Talibans have also carried out night raids against suspected ISIS–K fighters in the province and many of the hundreds arrested during those raids have either disappeared or turned up dead. The Taliban's harsh crackdown in the province against the suspected ISIS–K fighters has resulted in a number of human right violations by the Taliban fighters, according to Nangahar residents. Islamic State has also used Taliban's harsh crackdown as a part of its recruitment propaganda calling on Nangahar residents to rise up and resist the Taliban. Nangahar residents say that the Taliban fighters in the province are not familiar with the area and have no way to check the intelligence they receive about Islamic State targets. So the Taliban fighters have started killing anyone they suspect of working for the Islamic State, according to the residents. Washington Post reports that only a few Taliban fighters have the necessary training or experience to conduct precision-based operations in urban areas. As the Taliban are more adopted to guerrilla warfare, they are therefore still adjusting to maintain security during peacetime.

By early November IS-KP in Nangahar was repeatedly assassinating ex-republicans and pro-Taliban figures and attacked patrols with such a frequency that the Taliban government ordered its fighters in the province to no longer leave settlements at night.

On 2 November the 2021 Kabul hospital attack took place where assailants attacked the Daoud Khan Military Hospital with guns and suicide bombers killing at least 25 people and wounding at least 50 more people. A senior Taliban commander, Mawlawi Hamdullah Mukhlis, was killed in the attack. He was the head of the Kabul military corps and was one of the first "senior" Taliban commanders to enter the abandoned Afghan presidential palace on 15 August. The Taliban blamed ISIS–K for the attack and claimed that they killed at least four militants in a shootout. On the same day, ISIL claimed responsibility for killing a Taliban judge in a gun attack in PD-2, Jalalabad.

On 7 November at least three members of the Taliban security forces were killed and three others wounded in a series of attacks in Jalalabad. "Two blasts hit the Taliban, then the ISKP militants engaged in a gunfight and finally managed to escape".

On 10 November a spokesman for the General Directorate of Intelligence, the new name of the Afghan spy agency under Taliban rule, told reporters in Kabul that they have arrested nearly 600 members of ISIS–K including "high-ranking" commanders.

On 13 November at least three people were killed including Afghan journalist Hameed Saighani after a bus exploded in a majority Shia part of Kabul city. ISIS–K later claimed responsibility.

On 14 November ISIS–K militants gunned down and killed a Taliban fighter in Nangarhar.

On 15 November four ISIS–K members and three civilians were killed in a Taliban raid on a suspected ISIS–K hideout in Kandahar.

On 18 November a UN assessment concluded that members of ISIS–KP were now present in all of Afghanistan's 34 provinces.

On 20 November three Taliban fighters were killed after ISIS–K militants opened fire on their car in Jalalabad city.

On 22 November the United States revealed the names of and declared four main leaders of ISIS–K, including a funder of the organisation, as Specially Designated Global Terrorists (SDGTs). On the same day, ISIS–K claimed responsibility for shooting and killing a Taliban fighter and a former Afghan intelligence operative after their car was fired upon on Jalalabad.

On 25 November two Taliban members were shot and killed by ISIS–K militants in Jalalabad city.

On 30 November three ISIS–K militants were killed in a Taliban raid on a house in the city of Jalalabad. Four Taliban fighters were wounded in the operation.

On 4 December ISIS–K released a photo on telegram showing an IED explosion that targeted a Taliban patrol vehicle in Kabul.

On 5 December ISIS–K claimed responsibility for killing two Taliban fighters after shooting at their car in the city of Jalalabad.

On 6 December ISIS–K claimed responsibility for shooting dead a Taliban fighter in Taloqan. Making this ISIS–K's first claim of responsibility in Takhar Province since the Taliban takeover.

On 9 December during an interview, the spokesman for the Islamic Emirate of Afghanistan, Zabiullah Mujahid, claimed that since the re-foundation of the Islamic Emirate, 25 ISIS–K hideouts had been destroyed and that 670 ISIS–K fighters had been arrested. He also stated that "Daesh is no longer a big threat in Afghanistan. It was a small group that has now been dismantled in Kabul and Jalalabad."

On 14 December Nada Al-Nashif, the UN deputy high commissioner for human rights, announced that the Taliban had been responsible for at least 50 executions of suspected ISIS–K members, including hangings and beheadings. The same report also stated that the Taliban had conducted at least 72 executions of former Afghan security personnel.

==== 2022 ====
On 4 January ISIS–K claimed to have abducted and executed a Taliban 'spy' in the Mamandra region of Nangarhar.

On 16 January ISIS–K released footage of one of their operatives shooting dead a Taliban fighter in Herat.

On 23 January ISIS–K claimed responsibility for shooting dead a Taliban fighter in Taloqan.

On 30 January two Taliban fighters were targeted by ISIS–K gunmen in the Sarkani region of Kunar, on the Afghan-Pakistani border. One Taliban fighter was killed and the other was wounded.

On 13 February, during a televised interview with CNN's Fareed Zakaria, Pakistan Prime Minister Imran Khan urges the world to work with the Taliban to resolve the ongoing regional humanitarian crisis which resulted in part from the conflict.

On 22 February 2022 Pakistan officials acknowledged that the ongoing conflict was destabilizing Afghanistan and also threatening the stability of Pakistan.

On 4 March 2022 an ISIS–K suicide bomber attacked a Shiite mosque in the Pakistani city of Peshawar, killing 63 worshippers.

On 2 April ISIS–K claimed to have bombed a vehicle containing Taliban militants with an IED in District 5 of Kabul.

On 11 April 2022 Islamic State transforms and grows in Pakistan and Afghanistan, according to a report by the AP news agency. A concerted focus on "social media warfare" is critical to advance on the ideological battlefield but also to counter the pull of "enchanting" social media influencers, ISIS Khorasan declared in a new issue of the group's English-language magazine. In their magazine "Voice of Khurasan", ISIS Khorasan criticized the management and thinking of the Taliban.

On 19 April 2022 at least six people were killed and 17 injured in bomb attacks on two schools in Kabul. The students who attended these centers are from the Shiite Hazara minority, which is the population that lives in the Dashte Barchi neighborhood to the west of the Afghan capital. The Taliban spokesman for the Ministry of the Interior has warned that the death toll could increase. Several injured are in serious condition. No one has immediately claimed responsibility for the attacks but it is suspected that the Afghan affiliate of the Islamic State is guilty of the events

The Afghan affiliate of the Islamic State extremist group has claimed responsibility for a series of attacks against the country's Shiite minority during the week of 18–24 April 2022. The bomb attack on a mosque and religious school in northern Afghanistan, from 22 April, caused the death of 33 people, including students. Added to these attacks are those that occurred in two educational centers in the Shiite Hazara minority neighborhood of Dashte Barchi, in western Kabul, causing at least six deaths and 25 injuries, according to official data. several smaller explosions in recent days in different parts of Afghanistan, including another detonation today in a Kabul neighborhood that initially caused no casualties. There was also a roadside mine explosion yesterday in the eastern province of Nangarhar, which left at least four members of the Taliban security forces dead and one wounded. In the city of Kunduz, another detonation against a vehicle left four dead and 18 injured, including children. The Taliban announced the arrest of a former leader of IS-K in the northern region of Balkh, whose capital is Mazar-e-Sharif.

On Friday 29 April 2022 the last day of the holy month of Ramadan, there was a new attack against a Sufi Mosque in Afghanistan as part of the wave of violence that is sweeping the country. The explosion occurred in the west of the capital, Kabul, during prayers and killed 50 people, The same day two high-voltage towers in Parwan province were bombed on the night of Friday, 29 April 2022, cutting off electricity to the capital and neighboring provinces. Millions of people in eleven provinces of Afghanistan suffered blackouts on Saturday, 30 April 2022 after two power transmission towers were blown up west of the capital Kabul.

On 25 May at least nine people were killed in a triple bombing targeting mini-buses in the city of Mazar-i-Sharif. IS-KP later claimed responsibility.

On 18 June two people were killed and seven others were injured after gunmen attacked a Sikh temple in Kabul. ISIS–K claimed responsibility, claiming the attack was in revenge for 'insults made by members of India's ruling Bharatiya Janata Party about the Prophet Mohammed'. Seven ISIS–K gunmen were killed in a firefight with Taliban forces after the attack.

On 3 August two Taliban policemen and three Islamic State gunmen were killed during a gunbattle at a hideout in Kabul. Four other officers are wounded.

On 5 August eight people were killed and 18 others were injured after a bomb exploded at a Shia gathering in Kabul. ISIS–K later claimed responsibility.

On 11 August a senior Taliban cleric, Sheikh Rahimullah Haqqani, was blown up and killed in a suicide bombing during an Islamic seminary in Kabul. ISIS–K later claimed responsibility for the attack.

On 17 August a mosque in Kabul was attacked during evening prayers. It was reported that happen a huge explosion with 21 killed including the mosque's imam Amir Muhammad Kabuli. Another 33 people were injured.

On 2 September a bombing at a mosque in Herat killed at least 18 people and wounded 23 others. A senior Taliban cleric, Mujib Rahman Ansari, was killed in the blast.

On 5 September at least eight dead in an attack claimed by the self-styled Islamic State in Afghanistan. In the explosion, near the Russian embassy, a security guard and the second secretary of the delegation have died. In addition, four Afghan Taliban police officers have also been killed. An unclear number of people were injured in the bombing. RIA Novosti reported 15 to 20 wounded

On 23 September 2022 a car bomb exploded outside a mosque in the Wazir Akbar Khan neighbourhood of Kabul, Afghanistan. The explosion happened just as worshippers were leaving the building after finishing Friday prayers. Police said that seven people had been killed and 41 injured.

On 30 September 2022 a suicide bomber blew himself up at the Kaaj education center in Dashte Barchi, a Hazara neighborhood in Kabul, killing at least 52 people and injuring 110 others.

On 5 October 2022 four people were blown up and killed and a further 25 were wounded by an explosion at a mosque at the Ministry of Interior Affairs in Kabul.

On 22 October 2022 The Taliban killed six ISIS–K members during a raid in Kabul. A Taliban spokesman says they were responsible for the September 2022 Kabul mosque bombing and the September 2022 Kabul school bombing.

On 30 November 2022 at least 15 people were killed in a bombing at a madrasa in Aybak.

On 2 December 2022 two men disguised in burqas attack a mosque while former Mujahideen leader and Afghan prime minister Gulbuddin Hekmatyar, was inside. The attackers killed a civilian and injured two others before being shot dead by security guards. Hekmatyar was unhurt.

On 12 December 2022 insurgents attacked a hotel popular with Chinese nationals in Kabul, Afghanistan. At least three civilians were killed. Eighteen others, including foreigners, are reported to be among those injured. Islamic State – Khorasan Province claimed responsibility for the attack. Kabul's Emergency Hospital, run by an Italian non-profit near the attacked hotel in the Shahr-e-Naw area, reported receiving 21 casualties—18 injured and three dead on arrival.

On 27 December 2022 ISIS claimed responsibility for a car bombing that killed Abdulhaq Abu Omar, the Taliban police chief of the country's northeastern Badakhshan province. Omar is believed to be the highest-ranking Taliban security official slain since the Taliban took over Afghanistan in August 2021.

==== 2023 ====
On 1 January at least ten people were killed and eight others were wounded by an explosion at the entrance to the military airport in Kabul, the Afghan capital, on New Year's morning (1 January 2023), the Afghan Interior Ministry reported without providing further details or the exact number of victims. The jihadist group Islamic State (IS) today claimed responsibility for the attack against a surveillance post in the military zone of the Kabul airport and identified the suicide bomber, the same one who attacked a hotel frequented by Chinese citizens three weeks ago in the Afghan capital.

On 5 January a Taliban spokesperson stated that its forces have killed eight Islamic State insurgents, including foreign nationals, accusing them of having a "main role in the attack on [Longan] hotel". These killings, along with seven arrests, took place in a series of raids in Kabul and the western Nimruz Province.

On 11 January at least 20 people were killed in a suicide bombing outside the Ministry of Foreign Affairs in Kabul according to Information Ministry official Ustad Fareedun. Responsibility for the attack was claimed by the Islamic State.

On 27 February the Taliban forces killed two Islamic State militants who they described as "key commanders".

On 9 March, three people, including Mohammad Dawood Muzamil, the Taliban-appointed governor of Balkh Province, were killed by an explosion at his office.

On 17 March, the Taliban killed several Islamic State-Khorasan Province insurgents and seized weapons and ammunition during raids on hideouts in Mazar-i-Sharif, Balkh Province.

On 4 April six Islamic State members were killed during a raid by the Taliban in Balkh Province.

In 2023 Taliban security forces killed the head of the ISIS cell responsible for the 2021 Kabul airport attack.

On 6 June ISIS–K released a statement claiming responsibility for a car bombing which killed the Taliban-appointed Deputy Governor of Badakhstan. It was also reported that the Deputy Governor who was killed was in fact Badakhstan's acting Governor.

On 8 June 2023 a bombing took place during a mourning service at a mosque in Fayzabad, Badakhshan Province, northern Afghanistan. At least 13 people were killed in the blast, while more than 30 more were injured. The deputy governor of the province, Nisar Ahmad Ahmadi, who was killed that week in a car bombing, was remembered during the memorial service. The bombing happened close to the Nabawi Mosque in Fayzabad, the province's capital. ISIS claimed responsibility for the attack, which was aimed at Taliban officials who were attending the service, and also claimed at least 20 senior Taliban officials were killed and 50 others were injured, a higher figure than what the Taliban reported.

On 22 June 2023 ISIS magazine Khurasan Ghag released an issue titled "Shari'a Evaluation of Mullah Hibbatullah's Deceptive Words," which accused the Taliban of actually being "proxy fighters" of "unbeliever intelligence agencies" and also dubbed the Afghan Taliban's "Islamic System" government to not be in compliance with Sharia law. The magazine further accused Western powers of aiding the Taliban's return to power because they assumed that Ashraf Ghani's government would collapse and sought to maintain influence with a regime change, pointing out the Taliban's efforts to build relations with the United States and how the change in government did not end the nation's reliance on American dollars.

On 13 October 2023, an Islamic State suicide bomber attacked a Shia mosque in Puli Khumri, killing seven and injuring fifteen.

==== 2024 ====
On 6 January, ISIS–K detonated an explosive on a minibus in the Shia majority Dasht-e-Barchi, Kabul, killing five passengers and injuring dozens.

On 11 January, a grenade explosion outside a commercial center in Dasht-e-Barchi, Kabul killed two people and wounded twelve. No group claimed responsibility for the attack, though ISIS–K is suspected to have conducted it.

On 21 March, a suicide bomber attacked a private bank in Kandahar, resulting in the deaths of at least three people and injuring twelve others. Inamullah Samangani, head of the government's Kandahar Information and Culture Department, reported that the victims were people who had gathered at the branch of New Kabul Bank to collect their monthly salaries, emphasizing that the victims were civilians. According to medical personnel at the Mirwais Regional Hospital in Kandahar, about 50 others were injured, but the Taliban disputed these higher casualty numbers and insisted that the situation was "under control." Samangani attempted to minimize the severity of the incident, telling journalists; "There is no such issue, and the wounded people are not in serious condition; they have superficial injuries." Initial investigations by Taliban officials at the Ministry of Interior pointed towards ISIS–K as the perpetrator, a claim later reiterated by the group on their Telegram channel.

On 20 April, a sticky bomb detonated while attached to a car, killing the driver and wounding three others. The attack occurred in the Shia majority Kot-e-Sangi neighbourhood of Kabul. The culprits of the attack are believed to be ISIS–K.

On 29 April, a gunman opened fire on worshippers in a Shia mosque in Guzara district, Herat. Taliban officials said the attack occurred at 9:00 pm. AFT (UTC+04:30) and killed six people. ISIS–K claimed responsibility for the shooting the next day.

On 8 May, a motorcycle bombing killed three Taliban security personnel in Faizabad, Badakhshan. ISIS–K claimed responsibility for the attack.

On 17 May, a group of foreign tourists was attacked by gunmen at a market in Bamiyan Province. Three Spaniards and three Afghans were killed, including a Taliban member, and eight were injured. ISIS–K claimed responsibility for the attack.

On 11 August a bomb planted on a minibus in Dasht-e Barchi, Kabul killed one person and injured 11. No group claimed responsibility though ISIS–K is suspected to have conducted the attack.

On 2 September a suicide bomber killed six people outside a government building in Kabul. ISIS–K claimed the attack the next day, citing it as a response to the Taliban reactivating the prison in Bagram Airfield.

On 12 September ISIS-K gunmen opened fire on a group of Shia Hazara civilians in Daykundi returning form pilgrimage in Karbala, killing 14 and injuring six.

On 22 November a suspected ISIS-K gunman killed ten people at a Sufi shrine in Nahrin district, Baghlan.

The Afghan Minister of Refugees and Repatriation, Khalil Rahman Haqqani, died on 11 December 2024, in a suicide attack at his ministry offices in the capital Kabul, a Taliban government source indicated. A spokesman later explained that the Islamic State, a rival group of the Taliban, was responsible for the explosion that killed the official.The Islamic State claimed responsibility for the explosion that killed Khalil ur Rahman Haqqani, head of Refugees and Repatriation, who was in his office. The de facto government of the Taliban in Afghanistan held the funeral of the Minister of Refugees, Khalilur Rahman Haqqani on 12 December 2024, amid strict security measures. The attack was claimed by the jihadist group Islamic State (IS).

==== 2025 ====
On 11 February five people were killed—including Taliban security forces—and seven others injured during a suicide bombing outside New Kabul Bank in Kunduz.

In 2025 the Diplomat reported that the Islamic State – Khorasan Province is losing momentum and influence in Afghanistan due crackdown of many ISIS members in Afghanistan.

In August 2025 the Khorasan Diary reported that a key ISIS-K leader called Abdul Malik Afridi was assassinated by Lashkar-e-Islam (a Taliban affiliated group).

==== 2026 ====
On 19 January 2026 seven people including one Chinese national were killed and twenty others were injured in a bombing at a Chinese restaurant in Shahr-e Naw, Kabul, Afghanistan. The Islamic State – Khorasan Province claimed responsibility.

In June 2026 the BBC Monitoring reported that Islamic State – Khorasan Province is severely crippled and only a "shadow of its former self.'

During the 2026 Afghanistan–Pakistan war the Afghan Taliban claimed to have carried out several drone strikes on Islamic State – Khorasan Province hideouts in Pakistan, but this could not be independently verified.

On November 7 2026, Afghanistan International reported that Taliban spokesman Zabihullah Mujahid announced IS-KP no longer had presence in Afghanistan, having moved its operational base into unspecified parts of Pakistan.
