= Mardyan =

- Location in Afghanistan
- Coordinates: 36°59′50″N 66°18′24″E
- Country: Afghanistan
- Province: Jowzjan Province
- District: Mardyan District
- Elevation: 945 ft (288 m)
- Time zone: UTC+4:30

Mardyan (Pashto: مردیان) is a village and the center of Mardyan District, Jowzjan Province, Afghanistan. It is located at 36.9972°N 66.3067°E at 288 m altitude, northeast of Aqchah.

== See also ==
- Jowzjan Province
