= Murad Quenili =

Governor of Jowzjan Province, Afghanistan

Murad Quenili is the appointed governor of Jowzjan Province, Afghanistan.

Quenili was appointed in July 2013, succeeding Mohammad Aleem Sayee. He was born in the village of Qoyunly in the Mingajik District of Jowzjan. Prior to his appointment as governor, he was a member of the Afghanistan House of Elders, representing Jowzjan.
