= Battle of Darzab (2017) =

2017 battle in Afghanistan

- Part of the Islamic State–Taliban conflict, War in Afghanistan (2001–2021), and war on terror
Date	9 April – 27 April 2017
Location	Darzab District and surrounding districts, Jowzjan Province, Afghanistan
Result	ISIL victory: ISIL captures most of Darzab and Qush Tepa District from Taliban

Belligerents
Islamic State: Khorasan Province	Taliban	Afghanistan

Commanders and leaders
(Islamic State) Qari Hekmat (Islamic State) Mufti Nemat (Islamic State) Mullah Ghanzanfar (WIA)	Faiz Mohammad †; Sheikh Hamidullah †; Shahzada Mazlomyar †; Mohibullah †; Haji Nokur (POW)	(Afghanistan) Abdul Rashid Dostum (Afghanistan) Col. Abdull Hafiz Khashi (Afghanistan) Mohammad Reza Ghafori (Afghanistan) Brig. Gen. Rahmatullah Turkistani (Afghanistan) Rahmatullah Husher

Units involved
Qari Hekmat's network Mufti Nemat's militia	Unknown	Security Forces: National Army (ANA); Police

Strength
Unknown	Unknown	Hundreds

Casualties and losses
15 killed, 22 wounded	93 killed, 58 wounded, and 63 captured (including drug dealers)	4 killed
- 1 civilian killed

The Battle of Darzab was an armed conflict between the Taliban, soldiers of the Afghan armed forces, and fighters of the Islamic State's Khorasan Province (ISIS–K) in Darzab District of Jowzjan province of Afghanistan.

== First attacks ==
On 9 April, four Afghan soldiers, including a unit commander, were killed in an ambush as they raced to the scene of the recent clashes in Darzab by ISIL fighters. One day after, Taliban, alongside ISIL fighters attacked Alkhani and Moghol villages of Darzab district, leaving 13 Taliban fighters dead, and 10 ISIL fighters wounded, including ISIL commander Mullah Ghanzanfar. Taliban managed to capture Alkhani, but repelled in Moghol. Separately, a Taliban commander, Faiz Mohammad was killed and one of his fighters wounded when they stormed a security post in Qush Tepa District near Darzab. A civilian woman was also killed when a militant rocket struck a home on the outskirts of the district.

== Fighting between Taliban and ISIL ==
On 26 April, ISIL kidnapped 3 drug dealers in Darzab that were to have an opium deal with the Taliban. Taliban repeatedly asked ISIL to release the captives, but the later refused, leading the Taliban to gather forces in Darzab. After that, ISIL attacked the Taliban killing 79 Taliban fighters, wounding another 57, and capturing another 60. Among the dead Taliban fighters were three commanders, Sheikh Hamidullah, the Taliban district chief for Qush Tapa district and Tawakkal, Shahzada Mazlomyar, and Mohibullah. One Taliban commander was also among the captured, named Haji Nokur. Also, 15 ISIL fighter killed, and 12 wounded. ISIL captured most of Darzab from Taliban, along with Qush Tapa during the fighting.

== Aftermath ==
In 2018, the Taliban launched a major operation to take over the Darzab District and the surrounding districts from IS-KP. The battle was fought for 2 weeks and 6 days until following heavy clashes, IS-KP was defeated, with most of the group's forces in Jowzjan Province killed or captured. 3 out of the 4 IS-KP commanders surrendered to the Taliban. They killed Haji Murad, one of the IS-KP commanders at the battle and who was the Islamic State's deputy commander for Jowzjan. Taliban commander Mullah Burjan was executed and Haji Shakir was killed in action. At the end of the battle, more than 200 militants surrendered to the Taliban.
