= Battle of Darzab =

Battle of Darzab may refer to either of these events in Darzab District, Jowzjan Province, Afghanistan:

- Battle of Darzab (2017), among the Taliban, ISIL, and Afghan armed forces in April
- Battle of Darzab (2018), between the Taliban and ISIL in July
