= Al-Qaeda–Islamic State conflict =

Conflict between al-Qaeda and the Islamic State

al-Qaeda–Islamic State conflict
- Part of the War against the Islamic State, the war on terror, the Arab Winter, the Syrian civil war, the Iraqi conflict, the Afghan conflict, the War in the Sahel, the Boko Haram insurgency, the Somali Civil War, and the Insurgency in the Maghreb (2002–present)
Date	3 February 2014–present
Location	Various regions across the world
Status	Ongoing

Belligerents
al-Qaeda; (Islamic State) al-Qaeda in the Arabian Peninsula; Ansar al-Sharia; Jama'at Nasr al-Islam wal-Muslimin; Al-Shabaab; Al-Nusra Front (until 2016); Hurras al-Din (until 2025); Shura Council of Mujahideen in Derna (until 2018); Jemaah Islamiyah (until 2024); Abu Salim Martyrs Brigade (until 2015); Afghanistan (since 2021); Taliban; Supported by: Turkistan Islamic Party; Jama'at Ansar al-Islam (until 2025)	Islamic State; Yemen Province; Sahel Province; Somal Province; Khorasan Province; West Africa Province; Libya Province

Commanders and leaders
(al-Qaeda) Ayman al-Zawahiri X (al-Qaeda) Saif al-Adel	(Islamic State) Abu Bakr al-Baghdadi X (Islamic State) Abu Ibrahim al-Hashimi al-Qurashi ‡‡ (Islamic State) Abu al-Hasan al-Hashimi al-Qurashi ‡‡ (Islamic State) Abu al-Hussein al-Husseini al-Qurashi ‡‡ (Islamic State) Abu Hafs al-Hashimi al-Qurashi

Casualties and losses
- 10,000+ killed

The al-Qaeda–Islamic State conflict is an ongoing armed conflict between al-Qaeda and its allied groups, and the Islamic State.

== Background ==
=== Precursor to the split ===
Originally, the modern predecessor of Islamic State, Jama'at al-Tawhid wal-Jihad, was created in 1999 and led by its first leader, Abu Musab al-Zarqawi. He pledged allegiance to al-Qaeda in 2004, turning his group into an affiliated branch of al-Qaeda called al-Qaeda in Iraq, and al-Zarqawi was named the first Emir of the Two Rivers. After his pledge of allegiance, however, al-Zarqawi and Osama Bin Laden's relations would turn sour due to al-Zarqawi's brutal and extreme policies, which his brutal suicide bombing campaigns against both Western, Russian, Chinese and even Shia Muslim groups greatly disturbed al-Qaeda's core leader. To avoid division, then-deputy of al-Qaeda, Ayman al-Zawahiri, sent a delegation in order to negotiate to force al-Zarqawi to reduce his brutal policies and realign with al-Qaeda's major priorities, but the delegation was intercepted and arrested by American troops, derailing the final attempt to rein in al-Zarqawi's AQI group.

With al-Zarqawi killed by an airstrike on 7 June 2006, AQI reformed into the Islamic State of Iraq, and still affirmed allegiance with al-Qaeda. Repeated Iraqi, American and coalition forces hunting resulted in the decimation of the majority of IS force at the time, with two leaders killed. Behind the scenes, Nouri al-Maliki, then-Prime Minister of Iraq, had systemically purged the most experienced officers of the Iraqi Armed Forces, marginalising the minority Sunni in favour of his Shia group; this was capitalised by Islamic State of Iraq to bring in new and fresh recruits to the group. However, it was the outbreak of the Syrian civil war that the Islamic State was able to exploit from this gap via multifaceted alliances with various Syrian rebel groups to fight off the Assad government.

=== Split ===
On 8 April 2013, Abu Bakr al-Baghdadi, leader of the Islamic State of Iraq, released an audio statement in which he claimed that the Islamic State of Iraq, and al-Nusra Front, two al-Qaeda affiliated groups, were merging into one group called the Islamic State of Iraq and the Levant. Ahmed al-Sharaa, the then-leader of al-Nusra Front, and Ayman al-Zawahiri, the leader of al-Qaeda, both rejected the merger. Al-Sharaa claimed that he and all the other al-Nusra leaders had never given permission to Abu Bakr al-Baghdadi to merge the groups.

Ayman al-Zawahiri wrote a letter to both al-Sharaa and al-Baghdadi, who were both under his command at the time, in which he stated that he does not permit them to merge. He also sent a diplomat to put an end to tensions. Al-Baghdadi responded to al-Zawahiri's letter, and declared that he did not need al-Zawahiri's approval to do the merge, and that he was moving forward with the merge either way. The merge happened, with the Islamic State of Iraq and some al-Nusra fighters merging to form the Islamic State of Iraq and the Levant. Al-Nusra's leadership, as well as al-Qaeda, both officially rejected the merge, in which the tension resulted in the newly founded ISIL being isolated from the global jihadist network, which was dominated by al-Qaeda.

In October 2013, months after the merge, al-Zawahiri gave al-Baghdadi a final chance to disband ISIL, and return the jihadist movement in Syria to al-Nusra, and revive the Islamic State of Iraq and let it take control of the jihadist movement in Iraq. Al-Baghdadi refused to comply with al-Zawahiri, and ISIL continued to operate in both Iraq and Syria. In February 2014, after eight months of tension, in which ISIL constantly refused to comply with al-Qaeda's demands, al-Qaeda officially disavowed themself from ISIL, and cut all ties with them, beginning their enmity.

On 29 June 2014, ISIL changed its name to the "Islamic State", and declared its lands as a caliphate with Abu Bakr al-Baghdadi as the caliph. As a "Caliphate", it claimed authority over all Muslims and Muslim lands worldwide. The Islamic State's claim of being a legitimate Islamic caliphate was rejected by many Muslims, and was also rejected by al-Qaeda.

The Islamic State was described as being "far more ruthless" than al-Qaeda. For example, while al-Qaeda considers Shia Muslims to be disbelievers, they have also condemned the Islamic State's killing sprees against Shias. Osama bin Laden, despite his hatred for Shias, wanted to put the differences aside to establish a Sunni-Shia alliance to counter the supposed Jewish–Christian alliance which he claims was made to fight Islam. The Islamic State does not tolerate Shias at all.

== Conflict ==
Since its establishment, the Islamic State was hostile to al-Qaeda and its allies, including the Taliban. The conflict between al-Qaeda and the Islamic State conflict was also referred to as the "Jihadist civil war".

Also, since the establishment of the Islamic State, many al-Qaeda affiliated groups became fractured, with certain factions of the groups pledging allegiance to the Islamic State, while the rest opposed the Islamic State. These groups include Ansar al-Islam in Kurdistan, Boko Haram, the Islamic Movement of Uzbekistan, the Caucasus Emirate, Abu Sayyaf, Ansar Bait al-Maqdis, the Uqba ibn Nafi Brigade, and Al-Shabaab.

The first instance of the conflict was during the rise of the Islamic State in northwestern Iraq in 2014. Jama'at Ansar al-Islam began attacking Islamic State positions. The clashes continued for months, in which the Islamic State dominated. Some Jama'at Ansar al-Islam militants and commanders joined the Islamic State. Jama'at Ansar al-Islam later drastically declined, although remained active and continued to fight the Islamic State.

Initially, al-Qaeda in the Arabian Peninsula did not oppose the Islamic State, and many AQAP members actually supported the Islamic State and its establishment of a caliphate in Iraq and Syria. Nasir al-Wuhayshi, the former leader of AQAP, also intended to pledge allegiance to the Islamic State if they came to Yemen. However, when the Islamic State – Yemen Province was established in 2015, AQAP remained with al-Qaeda, and some AQAP members defected to ISYP. This brought the al-Qaeda–Islamic State conflict to Yemen. These two groups continued to clash throughout the Yemeni civil war.

Al-Qaeda affiliates and the Islamic State fought against each other in the Syrian civil war. While the Islamic State was in conflict with the entire Syrian opposition, al-Qaeda affiliates were open to partnerships with Islamist factions, while fighting moderate groups within the Syrian opposition. Al-Qaeda and the Islamic State also fight on opposing sides in the Mali War and the Boko Haram insurgency.

During the Derna campaign, the al-Qaeda affiliated Shura Council of Mujahideen in Derna successfully broke the Islamic State in Libya's siege on Derna and began fighting the Islamic State all around Libya.

=== The Kuje prison break case ===
On July 5, 2022, ISWAP and Ansaru, subgroup of al-Qaeda operating in northwestern Nigeria, launched a coordinated attack on Kuje prison near the capital of Nigeria, Abuja. The attack killed five people and freed 879 inmates, mainly members of both factions, although almost half were recaptured the following days.

== Major conflicts ==
=== JNIM–ISGS war ===
The JNIM–ISGS war is an ongoing armed conflict between Jama'at Nasr al-Islam wal Muslimin (JNIM) and the Islamic State – Sahil Province (ISGS), the Sahelian branches of al-Qaeda and the Islamic State, respectively. Since ISGS's formation in October 2016 and the creation of the JNIM coalition in 2017, the two groups had been described as the Sahelien exception or Sahelien anomaly: despite the global war between al-Qaeda and Islamic State affiliates since the latter's splinter from the former in 2014, both ISGS and JNIM have ignored each other and in rare cases worked together against Malian, Nigerien, Burkinabe, French, and international governments and non-Islamist militias until 2020.

The first ideological split between the two groups began in early 2019, but intensified in the summer 2020 due to a variety of factors. JNIM press releases in 2019 attempted to mend the split between the two jihadists groups and called for unity, but by early 2020, JNIM began calling the ISGS "khawarij", a pejorative term for a historical group of Muslims whom fought against the first Caliphate for inconclusive reasons. The ideological split was fueled by more confrontational propaganda after ISGS became an official province of the Islamic State under ISWAP in early 2019, and propaganda outlets fell under ISWAP control. ISGS referred to JNIM leaders Iyad Ag Ghaly and Amadou Koufa as allied with the Malian government to fight the ISGS, and accused them of starting a war.

=== Islamic State–Taliban conflict ===
The Islamic State–Taliban conflict is an ongoing insurgency waged by the Islamic State – Khorasan Province (IS–KP) against the Taliban regime in Afghanistan. The conflict initially began when both operated as rival insurgent groups in Nangarhar; since the formation of the Taliban's state in 2021, IS–KP members have enacted a campaign of terrorism targeting both civilians and assassinating Taliban members using hit-and-run tactics. The group have also caused incidents and attacks across the border in Pakistan.

==== Battle of Darzab (1st) ====
On 26 April, ISIL kidnapped three drug dealers in Darzab that were to have an opium deal with the Taliban. Taliban repeatedly asked ISIL to release the captives, but the latter refused, leading the Taliban to gather forces in Darzab. After that, ISIL attacked the Taliban killing 79 Taliban fighters, wounding another 57, and capturing another 60. Among the dead Taliban fighters were three commanders, Sheikh Hamidullah, the Taliban district chief for Qush Tapa district and Tawakkal, Shahzada Mazlomyar, and Mohibullah. One Taliban commander was also among the captured, named Haji Nokur. Also, 15 ISIL fighters killed, and 12 wounded. ISIL captured most of Darzab from Taliban, along with Qush Tapa during the fighting.

==== Battle of Darzab (2nd) ====
Hostilities between IS–KP and the Taliban intensified in early July 2018, after Islamic State fighters seized a Taliban-held village in Darzab District, and beheaded ten Taliban members they had captured there. In response, Taliban forces launched counter-attacks against IS–KP positions in three districts of Jowzjan, including Darzab and Qush Tepa, on 12 July. Fighting also spread to Faryab and Sar-e Pol, where Islamic State militants killed Haji Shakir, the Taliban leader in Sancharak. On 15 July, IS–KP captured Taliban commander Mullah Burjan in the village of Bibi Maryam, Darzab. His execution three days later caused further intensification of the clashes. By 18 July, a Taliban source claimed that fighting in Darzab District was restricted to the villages of Aqsai, Qara Yorth, Qarighach, and Tash Jawaz, while IS–KP had been allegedly ousted from Kumarlik, Bibi Mariam and Aqblaq.

Sometime in mid-July, the Taliban launched a major offensive to fully evict IS–KP from Jowzjan Province. Islamic State commander Mawlavi Habibul Rahman later claimed that the Taliban had amassed 2,000 fighters in Jowzjan from various areas, including Helmand Province, for this operation. Employing their elite/special forces, the Red Unit, the Taliban attacked the Islamic State's stronghold of Darzab from three sides simultaneously. By this time, Darzab was held by about 600 to 700 IS–KP fighters according to estimates of the Afghan government. On 22 July, the Taliban overran IS–KP at the villages of Mughal and Sardara, Darzab, where they killed Haji Murad (also known as Haji Qumandan), the Islamic State's deputy commander for Jowzjan. In course of heavy combat, the Taliban reportedly inflicted hundreds of casualties on IS–KP, and captured much war materiel. By 20 July, 3,500 to 7,000 civilians had been displaced by the fighting.

By 30 July, IS–KP was reduced to just two villages in Darzab, whereupon its leaders Mawlavi Habibul Rahman and Mufti Nemat decided to contact the Afghan government; they subsequently agreed to surrender in exchange for protection from the Taliban. The Afghan Air Force then started to bombard Taliban positions to prevent them from capturing the remaining Islamic State forces and to ensure their surrender. Nemat later claimed that the Afghan National Army had also agreed to evacuate them with helicopters, though this came not to pass; instead, the Islamic State fighters had to reach government-held territories on foot. About 245 fighters, alongside their families, subsequently surrendered on 1 August, though some Islamic State fighters had disappeared during the retreat. Nemat later speculated that these militants had possibly defected to the Taliban. Among those who laid down arms were, besides Mawlavi and Nemat, another commander known as "Sibghatullah", about 100 child soldiers, and 25 to 30 foreign mujahideen.

==== 2019–2020 Kunar offensive ====
Kunar offensive (May 2019 – March 2020) was a major offensive by Taliban forces against Islamic State in Kunar province which led to conquer of their territorial stronghold and death or surrender of most IS forces.

In April of May 2019 government forces and Taliban signed a deal in Kunar province which led to abolition of roadblocks and allowed both sides to pass through territories controlled by other side.

In May 2019 Taliban went on offensive against the Islamic State attacking their bases in Manogai and Chapa Dara districts, advancing from Laghman in the north, while simultaneously Taliban and local uprising forces from Chapa Dara district attacked parts of Korengal valley. Taliban managed to take control of those areas. From the south through Dara-ye Nur, Maulawi Asadullah (Taliban shadow district governor for Nurgal district) and his forces continued to advance towards Mazar Dara. Further Taliban advances on Dewagal valley were stopped by American airstrikes which struck both Taliban and ISIS–K forces leading to 50 to 80 IS fighters being killed and around 100 injured. Forty ISKP fighters surrendered to government forces in May 2019. Later that month group of foreign fighters arrived in the area to aid Islamic State. The group moved to Chalas and Kalaigal villages.

In mid-June 2019 Taliban launched offensive against ISIS–K forces in Degal village of Chapa Dara district. After week of fighting they cleared the district. In the same month they attacked two bases in Korengal and Kalaigal clearing them of IS fighters. On 23 August ISIS–K leader Mawlawi Basir surrendered along with 110 of his fighters.

In late October 2019 Taliban advanced through Narang-Badel and Chawkai district towards Dewagal taking a few villages in the area. U.S. again conducted airstrikes against both Taliban and ISIS–K forces. Mawlawi Khadem and Mawlawi Bashir commanders along with dozens of Islamic State fighters were killed in the airstrike. Due to airstrikes Taliban withdrew from Dewagal towards Badel and Korengal valleys. Heavy snowfalls from December 2019 to February 2020 stopped further advances.

In late February 2020 Taliban resumed advances on Dewagal valley, with U.S. airstrikes targeting ISIS–K fighters. As a result of the strikes multiple IS commanders were killed including Qari Sayed, Mawlawi Sharafuddin, Sheikh Attaullah, Mawlawi Halimi, Sheikh Khetab and Haji Musa. Hundreds of fighters surrender to the government and were transferred to Asadabad. Between 3 and 4 March heavy clashes were reportedly ongoing in Mazar Dara (Nurgal), Dewagal Dara (Chawkay), and Shoraik and Kalaigal areas (Dara-ePech). Seven thousand people were displaced as a result of clashes in Nurgal district.

On 14 March Taliban forces claimed that as a result of 14-day offensive they have cleared entire Kunar province from Khorasan forces. They also claimed that 114 IS members surrendered to Taliban while 100 fled. U.S. officials claimed that dozens of Islamic State fighters also surrendered to government forces.

After retaking Dewagal, Mazar and Badel valley Taliban burned down houses of ISIS–K commanders and executed at least seven Islamic State fighters in Dewagal valley. They also arrested several tribal elders who cooperated with the enemy.

== See also ==
- Islamic Army–Al-Qaeda conflict
- Islamic State–Taliban conflict
- JNIM–ISSP war
- Salafi jihadist insurgency in the Gaza Strip
- Sinai insurgency
