= Saira Shekeb Sadat =

Afghan politician

Mrs. Saira Shekeb Sadat
- President: Hamid Karzai

Saira Shekeb Sadat is the first female Wuluswal (English: sub-governor) of Afghanistan. She was appointed as the governor of the provincial district of Aqcha of Jowzjan Province.
