= Darzab, Jowzjan =

Darzāb درزاب
- Location in Afghanistan
- Coordinates: 36°37′8″N 65°37′9″E
- Country: Afghanistan
- Province: Jowzjan Province
- District: Darzab District
- Elevation: 4,439 ft (1,353 m)
- Time zone: UTC+4:30

Darzab (Dari: درزاب) is a town and the center of the Darzab District, Jowzjan Province, Afghanistan.

== See also ==
- Darzab District
- Jowzjan Province
