= Mingajik =

- Location in Afghanistan
- Coordinates: 37°1′38″N 66°7′42″E
- Country: Afghanistan
- Province: Jowzjan Province
- District: Mingajik District
- Elevation: 922 ft (281 m)
- Time zone: UTC+4:30

Mingajik (Mengajīk, Mengeh Jek, Mingajek, Mungajik) (Pashto: منگجک Dari: منگجک) is a village and the center of Mingajik District, Jowzjan Province, Afghanistan. It is located at 37.0272°N 66.1283°E at 281 m altitude, a few miles from Aqchah in the northwest.

== See also ==
- Jowzjan Province
