= Fayzabad District =

Fayzabad District may refer to:

- Fayzabad District of Badakhshan Province in eastern Afghanistan
- Fayzabad District is a district in Tajikistan.
- Fayzabad District of Jowzjan Province in northern Afghanistan
