= Shibirghan District =

District of Faryab, Afghanistan

Shibirghan شبرغان
- District
- Location within Afghanistan
- Country: Afghanistan
- Province: Jowzjan
- Capital: Sheberghan

Shibirghan (Dari: شبرغان) is a district situated in the southern part of Jowzjan province in Afghanistan. It borders Faryab province to the west, Khwaja du koh District to the north, Aqcha District to the east and Sar-e Pol province. The population is 188,808 (2019). The center is the provincial capital Sheberghan. There are main roads from the district center towards Herat, Kabul, Andkhoy and Mazari Sharif. Sheberghan airfield is situated between Sheberghan and Aqchah.
