= List of equipment of the Afghan Armed Forces =

This is a list of equipment used by the Afghan Armed Forces.

== Small arms ==
Name	Image	Caliber	Type	Origin	Notes
Pistols
PM		9×18mm	Semi-automatic pistol	Soviet Union	
TT-33		7.62×25mm	Semi-automatic pistol	Soviet Union	Used by the Red Unit.
Smith & Wesson SD		9x19mm	Semi-automatic pistol	United States	Unknown number in service captured from former Afghan National Army.
Submachine guns
PM-63 RAK		9×18mm	Submachine gun	Poland	
Škorpion		9×19mm	Submachine gun	Czechoslovakia	
Heckler & Koch MP5		9×19mm	Submachine gun	West Germany; Pakistan	
Rifles
AK-47		7.62×39mm	Assault rifle	Soviet Union	
AKM		7.62×39mm	Assault rifle	Soviet Union	
AK-74		5.45×39mm	Assault rifle	Soviet Union	AK-74, AKS-74 and AKS-74U variants.
Type 56		7.62x39mm	Assault rifle	China	Captured from the former Afghan National Army.
ASH-78		7.62×39mm	Assault rifle	Albania	36,900 captured from the former Afghan National Army.
AMD-65		7.62×39mm	Assault rifle	Hungary	Unknown number captured from former Afghan police.
Zastava M70B1		7.62×39mm	Assault rifle	Yugoslavia	Captured from the former Afghan National Army.
AIMS-74		5.45×39mm	Assault rifle	Romania	Captured from the former Afghan National Army.
FB Beryl		5.56×45mm	Assault rifle	Poland	Captured from the former Afghan National Army.
M16A2/A4		5.56×45mm	Assault rifle	United States	104,000 captured from the former Afghan National Army.
M4A1		5.56×45mm	Carbine; Assault rifle	United States	10,000 captured from the former Afghan National Army.
Colt 933		5.56×45mm	Carbine; Assault rifle	United States	Captured from the former Afghan National Army.
SA80		5.56×45mm	Bullpup; Assault rifle	United Kingdom	Captured from the former Afghan National Army.
Heckler & Koch G3		7.62×51mm	Battle rifle	West Germany; Iran; Turkey	
SMLE No.4 Mk.1		.303 British	Bolt-action	United Kingdom	Captured from the former Afghan National Army.
Sniper rifles
PSL		7.62×54mmR	Designated marksman rifle Sniper rifle	Romania	Captured from the former Afghan National Army.
SVD		7.62×54mmR	Designated marksman rifle Sniper rifle	Soviet Union	Captured from the former Afghan National Army.
M40A5		7.62×51mm	Sniper rifle	United States	
Machine guns
ZB-53		7.92×57mm	Medium machine gun	Czechoslovakia	
SG-43		7.62×54mmR	Medium machine gun	Soviet Union	Captured from the former Afghan National Army.
M249 SAW		5.56×45mm	Light machine gun	United States	Unknown number in service captured from former Afghan National Army.
RPD		7.62×39mm	Light machine gun	Soviet Union	
RPK		7.62×39mm	Squad automatic weapon	Soviet Union	
PKM		7.62×54mmR	General-purpose machine gun	Soviet Union	
Zastava M72		7.62×39mm	Light machine gun	Yugoslavia	Captured from the former Afghan National Army.
Zastava M84		7.62×54mmR	General-purpose machine gun	Yugoslavia	Captured from the former Afghan National Army.
UK vz. 59		7.62×54mmR	General-purpose machine gun	Czechoslovakia	Captured from the former Afghan National Army.
MG 3		7.62×51mm	General-purpose machine gun	West Germany	Captured from the former Afghan National Army.
KPV		14.5×114mm	Heavy machine gun	Soviet Union	
DShK		12.7×108mm	Heavy machine gun	Soviet Union	
Zastava M02 Coyote		12.7×108mm	Heavy machine gun	Yugoslavia	
M2 Browning		.50 BMG	Heavy machine gun	United States	Captured from the former Afghan National Army.
M134 Minigun		7.62×51mm	Rotary Medium machine gun	United States	Captured from the former Afghan National Army.
Rocket propelled grenade launchers
RPG-2		40mm	Rocket-propelled grenade	Soviet Union	
RPG-7		40mm	Rocket-propelled grenade	Soviet Union	
RPG-16		58mm	Rocket-propelled grenade	Soviet Union	
RPG-18		64mm	Rocket-propelled grenade	Soviet Union	Captured from the former Afghan National Army.
RPG-29		64mm	Rocket-propelled grenade	Soviet Union	
Type 69		40mm	Rocket-propelled grenade	China	Captured from the former Afghan National Army.
RPO-A Shmel		93mm	Missile launcher	Soviet Union	Captured from the former Afghan National Army.
Grenade launchers
M203		40×46mm	Grenade launcher	United States	At least 1,394 grenade launchers were captured from the former Afghan National Army.
AGS-17		30×29mm	Automatic grenade launcher	Soviet Union	
QLZ-87		35×32mm	Automatic grenade launcher	China	Captured from the former Afghan National Army.

== Anti-tank weapons ==
Name	Image	Type	Origin	Caliber	Notes
B-10		Recoilless rifle	Soviet Union	82mm	
SPG-9		Recoilless rifle	Soviet Union	73mm	
SPG-82		Recoilless rifle Anti-tank weapon	Soviet Union	82mm	
9M14 Malyutka		Anti-tank weapon	Soviet Union		
MILAN		Anti-tank weapon	Germany; France		271 captured from the former Afghan National Army.
BGM-71 TOW		Anti-tank weapon	United States		

== Vehicles ==
=== Tanks ===
Name	Image	Type	Origin	Quantity	Notes
T-55		Medium tank	Soviet Union; Czechoslovakia	110+	T-55A and T-55AM2 spotted during 2025 Afghanistan–Pakistan conflict.
T-62M		Main Battle Tank	Soviet Union	100	Still seen in parades.

=== Infantry fighting vehicles ===
Name	Image	Type	Origin	Quantity	Notes
BMP-1		Infantry fighting vehicle	Soviet Union	350	
BMP-2		Infantry fighting vehicle	Soviet Union	150	

=== Tankettes ===
Name	Image	Type	Origin	Quantity	Notes
L3/35		Tankette	Italy	1+	At least one seen in use by Taliban in working condition.

=== Armored personnel carriers ===
Name	Image	Type	Origin	Quantity	Notes
BTR-50		Amphibious Armored personnel carrier	Soviet Union	100	
BTR-70		Armored personnel carrier	Soviet Union	360	
M113A2		Armored personnel carrier	United States	173	
M1117 Guardian		Internal security vehicle	United States	636	

=== Mine-resistant ambush protected vehicles ===
Name	Image	Type	Origin	Quantity	Notes
International MaxxPro		MRAP	United States	70	

=== Utility vehicles ===
Name	Image	Type	Origin	Quantity	Notes
HMMWV		LUV	United States	20000+	
Ford Ranger		Utility vehicle	United States	900	
Toyota Hilux		Utility vehicle	Japan	Unknown	
UAZ-469		Utility vehicle	Soviet Union	Unknown	
Trucks
ZIL-131		Utility truck	Soviet Union	Unknown	
KamAZ-4310		Utility truck	Soviet Union	Unknown	
Navistar 700		Utility truck	United States	323	
M915		Semi-tractor	United States	7	
HEMTT		Heavy tactical truck	United States	2	

== Artillery ==
Name	Image	Type	Origin	Quantity	Notes
Rocket artillery
BM-21 Grad		Multiple rocket launcher	Soviet Union	3	
Mortars
BM-37		Infantry mortar	Soviet Union	152	Captured from the former Afghan National Army.
PM-43		Mortar	Soviet Union	1,000	Captured from the former Afghan National Army.
M1938		Heavy mortar	Soviet Union	Unknown	Captured from the former Afghan National Army.
Field artillery
M-30		Howitzer	Soviet Union	232	
D-30		Howitzer	Soviet Union	41	

== Air defence systems ==
=== Man-portable air-defense systems ===
Name	Image	Type	Origin	Quantity	Notes
FIM-92 Stinger		MANPADS	United States	Unknown	

=== Towed anti-aircraft guns ===
Name	Image	Type	Origin	Quantity	Notes
ZU-23-2		Autocannon	Soviet Union	18	

== Individual equipment ==
Name	Image	Type	Origin	Notes
Camouflage pattern
Universal Camouflage Pattern		Combat uniform	United States	Unknown number in service, captured from the United States Army during the War in Afghanistan. Used in unconventional warfare to attack government targets.
U.S. Woodland		Combat uniform	United States	Unknown number in service, captured from the former Afghan National Army.
Wz. 89 Puma		Combat uniform	Poland	Unknown number in service, captured from the former Afghan National Army.
Helmets
Vz. 53		Combat helmet	Czechoslovakia	Captured from the former Afghan National Army and police.
Hełm wz. 50		Combat helmet	Poland	Captured from the former Afghan National Army.
Hełm wz. 67		Combat helmet	Poland	Captured from the former Afghan National Army
MICH		Combat helmet	United States	Captured from the former Afghan National Army.
Body armor
Interceptor		Body armor	United States	Captured from the former Afghan National Army and police.

== Bibliography ==
- Brayley, Martin J. (22 April 2013). Kalashnikov AK47 Series: The 7.62 x 39mm Assault Rifle in Detail. Crowood. ISBN 978-1-84797-526-3.
- Foss, Christopher F.; Gander, Terry J., eds. (1999). Jane's Military Vehicles and Logistics, 1999-2000 (20th ed.). Jane's Information Group. ISBN 978-0-7106-1912-9.
- International Institute for Strategic Studies (2024). "Chapter Five: Asia". The Military Balance. 124 (1). Taylor & Francis: 218–327. doi:10.1080/04597222.2024.2298593. ISSN 0459-7222.
- Jones, Richard; Ness, Leland S., eds. (14 January 2010). Jane's Infantry Weapons 2010-2011 (36th ed.). Jane's Information Group. ISBN 978-0-7106-2908-1.
- Shankar, Colonel C. P. (2015). Military in Pakistan and Afghanistan A Brief History. Neha Publishers & Distributors. ISBN 978-9380318851.
