= Mardyan District =

Mardyan مردیان
- District
- Location within Afghanistan
- Country: Afghanistan
- Province: Jowzjan

Mardyan (Pashto: مردیان) is a district situated in the central eastern part of the Jowzjan Province, Afghanistan. It borders Mingajik District to the west, Qarqin District to north, Balkh Province and Fayzabad District to the east and Aqcha District to the south. In 2006, the population was 34,200. The district center is the village of Mardyan, located in the central part of the district.

== District Map ==
- AIMS District Map
