= Badri 313 Battalion =

- بدري ٣١٣ قطعه
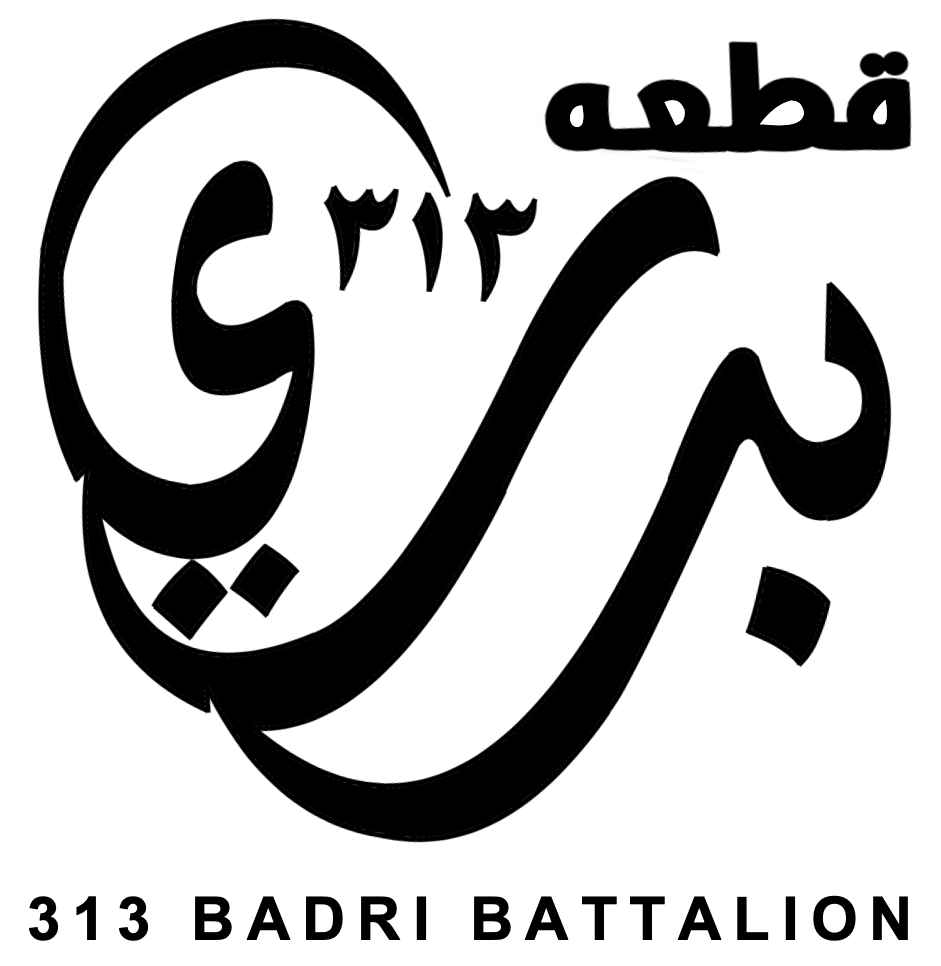
- Active: 2015–present
- Country: Islamic Emirate of Afghanistan
- Allegiance: Islamic Emirate of Afghanistan
- Branch: Ministry of the Interior; Haqqani network
- Type: Special forces
- Role: Urban warfare Military Training; Protective security
- Size: 600-700 (2022 estimate)
- Garrison/HQ: Saladin Ayyubi Military Academy
- Mottos: We Strike To Destroy, "Zuh my Zih (Kermat)"
- Equipment: List of equipment of the Afghan Armed Forces
- Engagements: List of wars involving Afghanistan: War in Afghanistan (2001–2021); Taliban insurgency; 2021 Taliban offensive; Republican insurgency in Afghanistan; Islamic State–Taliban conflict; 2026 Afghanistan-Pakistan war

Commanders
- Interior Minister and Head of the Haqqani network: Sirajuddin Haqqani

Aircraft flown
- Attack helicopter: Mil Mi-17

The Badri 313 Battalion (Pashto: بدري ٣١٣ قطعه) is one of two special forces units of the Taliban. The unit has been part of the Haqqani network since 2015, and has been incorporated into the Interior Ministry under Sirajuddin Haqqani since the Taliban's 2021 victory.

Elite Taliban special forces units like the Badri 313 have been reported as being "critical in the taking over of Afghanistan". In July and August 2021, the Taliban released online video on the Badri 313 Battalion in various local languages, English and Arabic.

The Badri 313 Brigade is headquartered at Salahaddin Ayyubi Military Operations Academy.

== Name ==
This unit is named after the Prophet Muhammad's army of 313 men at the Battle of Badr, an early Muslim military victory against the Quraysh which took place on March 13, 624.

== History ==
The Haqqani network holds an important position within the Taliban's military as well as high command. The Haqqanis have traditionally called their elite special forces the "Badri Army". Units termed "Army of Badr" first carried out commando style raids, guerrilla warfare, and suicide attacks on positions associated with the Islamic Republic of Afghanistan and its allies in 2011.

The Badri 313 Battalion first emerged in the late stages of the Taliban insurgency, notably taking part in an attack on British security company G4S's Kabul compound in November 2018. After the 2021 Fall of Kabul, the Taliban reported that the Badri 313 Battalion were securing the Arg (the Afghani Presidential Palace) and other important sites in the city. The Badri 313 Battalion were also reported as providing "security" at the Kabul Airport.

The Badri 313 Battalion garnered worldwide attention after the Taliban victory in Afghanistan by mocking the US military by copying the Raising the Flag on Iwo Jima.

== Equipment ==
The battalion is equipped with camouflage uniforms, combat helmets, body armor, night-vision goggles, M4 carbines, sidearms and Humvees of US origin. Many of the weapons they are outfitted with were left behind during the disastrous withdrawal of American forces in 2021.
