= Khaniqa District =

Khaniqa District خانقاه
- District
- Location within Afghanistan
- Country: Afghanistan
- Province: Jowzjan

Khaniqa District (Dari: خانقاه) is a district of Jowzjan Province in Afghanistan.

== District Map ==
- Map of Settlements AIMS, August 2002
