= Fall of Sangin =

Town located in Afghanistan

- Part of the War in Afghanistan (2001–2021)
Date	January 2017 – 23 March 2017
Location	Sangin, Afghanistan
Result	Major Taliban victory: Taliban capture Sangin; Afghan forces withdrew from Sangin

Belligerents
Taliban	Islamic Republic of Afghanistan; Supported by: United States

Commanders and leaders
Mullah Agha † (shadow Governor of Helmand)	(Afghanistan) Mohammad Rasoul (Sangin police chief)

Units involved
Red Unit (Taliban special forces)	Afghan National Security Forces: Afghan National Army; Sangin Police

Strength
Unknown	338 215th Corps (8 Officers)

Casualties and losses
111 killed, 40 injured	132+ killed unknown wounded
- 50+ Civilians killed and 35 Civilians wounded by American Airstrikes

The town of Sangin, in Helmand Province, Afghanistan, was captured by the Taliban on 23 March 2017. For two months, the Taliban had launched fresh attacks in trying to recapture the town.

== Early fights ==
In January, Taliban fighters launched a strong attack against government positions in Sangin, killing more than 100 soldiers and police officers, but they were driven back with help from extra troops and airstrikes. Officials said the fighters used tunnels from private houses to reach front-line government checkpoints. Also on 31 January, 19 Taliban fighters were killed and 25 others wounded. Two Afghan service members were killed and as many wounded during the clashes.

On 2 February, at least 32 Taliban insurgents were killed, including three commanders and 40 wounded during an attack on a military base in Sangin district during the past four days, provincial governor's office said in a statement. On 11 February, Helmand governor Hayatullah Hayat said at least 60 Taliban insurgents were killed at night in security operations backed foreign air forces, which caused civilians casualties. Later, the United Nations mission in Afghanistan said that US airstrikes in Sangin occurred on 9 and 10 February and initial inquiries suggest that the airstrikes killed at least 18 civilians, nearly all women and children.

== Fall of the town ==
The area around Sangin had been a hotspot of Taliban activity for several years, and the district itself had seen more British and American marines killed than any other district in Afghanistan. After enduring repeated insurgent attacks, the government forces tasked with defending the town reportedly withdrew overnight, enabling the Taliban to take control early in the morning of 23 March.

== Aftermath ==
Since the town lies on a key road into Lashkar Gar, the loss of Sangin has been interpreted as a major setback for the Afghan government, potentially paving the way for further Taliban advances in Helmand and Kandahar provinces. Colonel Richard Kemp, who previously commanded British forces in Afghanistan, said that British and American troops "should have remained in Afghanistan in much greater numbers to see them through the very dangerous transition period for longer". Immediately after the withdrawal in March, Sangin police chief Mohammad Rasoul had stated that security forces were preparing "reinforcements to recapture the district", although no significant reported action has taken place. In April 2017, a deployment of 300 US Marines began arriving in the region, at Camp Shorabak (formerly Camp Bastion), in a non-combative support role for the ANA 215th Corps, including "following them onto the battlefield".
