= Fayzabad District, Jowzjan =

Fayzabad فیض‌آباد
- District
- Location within Afghanistan
- Coordinates: 36°42′N 66°20′E
- Country: Afghanistan
- Province: Jowzjan

Area
  - Total: 1,160 km^{2} (450 sq mi)

Population (2011)
  - Total: 56,000

Fayzabad (Dari: فیض‌آباد) is a district situated in the eastern part of Jowzjan province, Afghanistan. It borders Aqcha District to the west, Mardyan District to the north, Balkh Province to the east and Sar-e Pol Province to the south. The population is 56,000 (2011). The district center is the village of Fayzabad. It is situated in the northern part of the district, a few miles north of the main Sheberghan - Mazari Sharif road.

== District Map ==
- AIMS District Map
