= Mingajik District =

Mingajik منگجک
- District
- Interactive map of Mingajik
- Location within Afghanistan
- Coordinates: 37°3′19.023″N 65°59′20.749″E
- Country: Afghanistan
- Province: Jowzjan
- Capital: Mingajik

Population (2006)
  - Total: 38,100

Mangajik District (Pashto: منگجک Dari: منگجک) is a district situated in the central part of Jowzjan province, Afghanistan. It borders Khwaja du koh and Khamyab districts to the west, Qarqin District to the north, Mardyan District to the east and Aqcha District to the south. In 2006, the population was 38,100. The district center is the village of Mingajik, located in the southern part of the district and a few miles from Aqchah to the northwest.

== District Map ==
- AIMS District Map
