= Red Unit =

Taliban's elite commando/shock troop unit

- سره قطعه
- Active: 2016–present
- Country: Afghanistan
- Allegiance: Islamic Emirate of Afghanistan
- Branch: Afghan Army
- Type: Special operations forces Shock troops Commandos
- Engagements: War in Afghanistan (2001–2021); Taliban insurgency; Fall of Sangin; Battle of Kunduz (2015); 2021 Taliban offensive; Republican insurgency in Afghanistan; Islamic State–Taliban conflict

Commanders
- Current commander: Hibatullah Akhundzada (Leader of the Islamic Emirate of Afghanistan)
- Notable commanders: Haji Nasarv; Mullah Taqi †; Mullah Shah Wali

The Red Unit (Pashto: سره قطعه, romanized: Sara kheta), also known as the Blood Unit, Red Group, Danger Group, or Taliban Special Forces Unit, is a military unit of the Islamic Emirate Army of the Islamic Emirate of Afghanistan, described in some accounts as special operations forces or shock troops.

== History ==
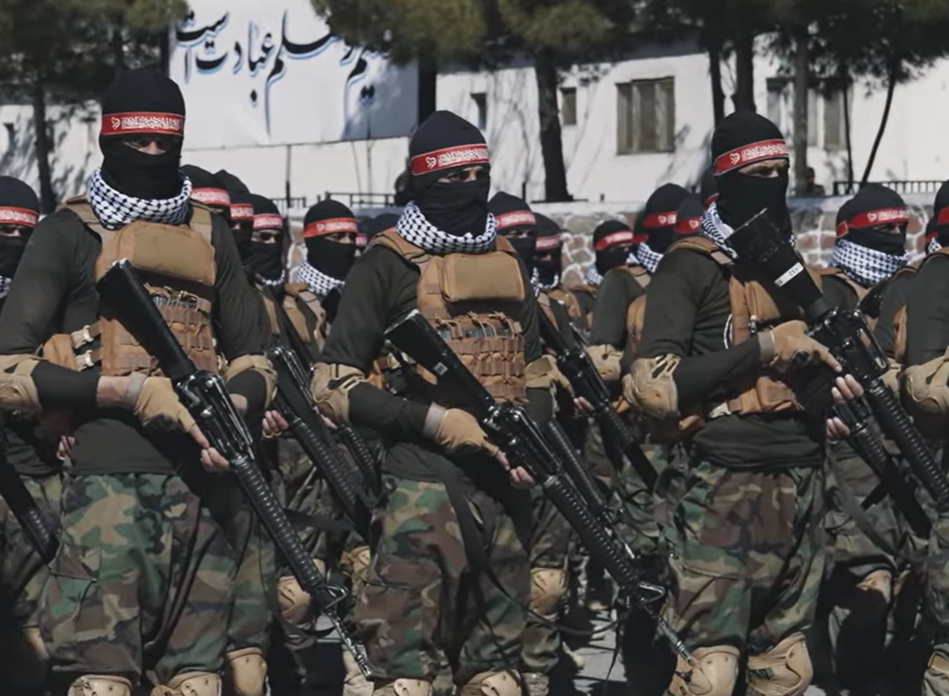
The Afghan Blood Unit.

The Red Unit saw its first operational deployment in Sangin in early 2016. In the summer of that year a Taliban spokesperson reported to media that the Red Unit was producing consistently "good" results in actions against the Afghan National Army and discussions were underway about utilizing it for increased operational deployments. The assessment of the unit's potency was echoed by provincial officials in Helmand who described the outfit as "very dangerous and very successful". In the subsequent time, the Red Unit began operating all around Afghanistan and used by the insurgents for the most important as well as dangerous missions.

In July 2018, the Red Unit played an important part in the Battle of Darzab, which resulted in a major Taliban victory over the Islamic State of Iraq and the Levant – Khorasan Province. By late 2018, the unit was known to be most active in Kunduz Province, Baghlan Province, and Faryab Province, aiding in a number of major Taliban advances in these areas.

The Red Unit was involved in the 2021 Taliban offensive, assisting in capturing Kunduz from Afghan government forces and taking part in the Battle of Lashkargah during which one of its commanders, Mawlawi Mubarak, was killed by an airstrike.

== Tactics, equipment, and membership ==
The Red Unit, which numbered approximately 300 by 2016, reportedly employs commando tactics and is equipped with "advanced weaponry", including night vision equipment, heavy machine guns and M4 carbines. Members have been seen during photo ops to be carrying Icom IC-V8 VHF radios. They are known to be especially proficient in night combat, and considered to be better trained and equipped than most Afghan National Army soldiers.

Though generally called the Taliban's special forces or commandos, analysts have argued that the Red Unit was probably not performing traditional special operations missions, but were, instead, being used as shock troops or a rapid deployment force. Moving on motorcycles, the unit often raids isolated outposts, destroying the local defences, and then retreating before other forces can respond. The Red Unit often spearheads Taliban offensives, as it has proven to be very effective in combat. Nevertheless, its equipment and training are inferior to those of Western special forces. By 2021, the unit was among the most elite Taliban units, alongside the Badri 313 Battalion.

Its members differ in various regards from regular Taliban troops. Unlike other Taliban, they are not loyal to various clans or villages, but to the movement itself. By 2020, one of the unit's training camps was the so-called "Tariq bin Ziad Military Corps", located in the mountains of Paktika Province.

== Leadership ==
The first known commander of the unit was Haji Nasarv according to a 2016 report by the Military Times. In 2017 the BBC reported the Red Unit commander was Mullah Taqi. The Afghan National Directorate of Security reported that Mullah Taqi was killed by NATO forces in late November 2017. He was succeeded by Mullah Shah Wali (alias "Haji Nasir"), who was killed in December 2017. An advisor to Mullah Shah Wali, the German mujahid Abdul Wadood, was captured by the Afghan military in March 2018. By 2020, one of the unit's main trainers was Ammar Ibn Yasser who was described as "the Mujahideen of Mujahideen" by Taliban media.

== See also ==
- Badri 313 Battalion
- Afghan Army
