= Aqcha District =

Aqcha ولسوالی آقچه آقچه اولسوالیگی
- District
- Location within Afghanistan
- Coordinates: 36°54′N 66°13′E
- Country: Afghanistan
- Province: Jowzjan

Area
  - Total: 1,070 km^{2} (410 sq mi)

Population (2020)
  - Total: 110,652

Aqcha (Dari: ولسوالی آقچه, in Uzbek: آقچه اولسوالیگی, Oqcha uwalsvoligi) is a district situated in the central part of Jowzjan province in northern Afghanistan. It borders Mardyan and Mingajik districts to the north, Sheberghan District to the West, Sar-e Pol Province to the south and Fayzabad District to the east. In 2020, the population was greater than 100,652. The district capital is the city of Aqcha, which is situated in the northern, more populated part of the district. The region is known for traditional carpets and rugs. The main road from Sheberghan to Mazar-i-Sharif passes a few kilometers south of the city of Aqcha.

The Taliban's shadow governor of Aqcha District was arrested with two others on 27 October 2013 as part of an operation carried out jointly between Afghan and coalition troops. The man went by the name of Jawid or Qari Shafiqullah.

== District Map ==
- Map of Settlements AIMS, 2002
