= Qari Hekmat =

Uzbek Islamic militant

Qari Hekmatullah
- Born: c. 1972–1973; Uzbekistan
- Died: 5 April 2018; Khawaja Arab, Bilchiragh District, Faryab Province, Afghanistan
- Military career
- Allegiance: Taliban (Until November 2015); Islamic State (October 2016 - 5 April 2018)
- Conflicts: War in Afghanistan

Qari Hekmatullah (Pashto: قاري حکمت الله, Uzbek: Qori Hikmatulloh) (died 5 April 2018) was an Uzbek Islamic militant and commander for the Islamic State in Afghanistan. With his main base of operations in Darzab District and Qush Tepa District of Jowzjan Province, he extended IS influence into Faryab Province and Sar-e Pol Province.

== Biography ==
Qari Hekmat was born in Uzbekistan and is sometimes said to be the son of Tohir Yoʻldosh, founder of the Islamic Movement of Uzbekistan.

Hekmat had long been a Taliban commander in Jowzjan Province and was their shadow governor for Darzab District.

In Nov 2015, he allegedly accused a woman of adultery and intended to stone her to death, but was prevented. This incident led to him being expelled by the Taliban for "cruel activities".

In October 2016 he joined the Islamic State and commanded at least 200 armed men. He soon moved into Qush Tepa District, defeating local Taliban.

In 2017 the governor of Sar-e-Pul province said Hekmat was increasing recruitment there.

== Death ==
Helmat was killed in a United States airstrike in the Khawaja Arab village of Bilchiragh District of Faryab Province on 5 April 2018.
