= Darzab District =

Darzāb درزاب
- District
- Location within Afghanistan
- Coordinates: 36°00′N 65°22′E
- Country: Afghanistan
- Province: Jowzjan
- Capital: Darzāb

Area
  - Total: 453 km^{2} (175 sq mi)

Population (2012)
  - Total: 52,800

People in Darzab District

Darzab (Dari: درزاب) is the southwesternmost district in Jowzjan province, Afghanistan. It borders Sheberghan District to northeast, Sar-e Pol Province to the west and Faryab Province to the south and west. The population is 52,800 (2012). The district center is Darzab.

== District Map ==
- Map of Settlements AIMS, August 2002
