= Aqcha =

Aqcha آقچه
- Town
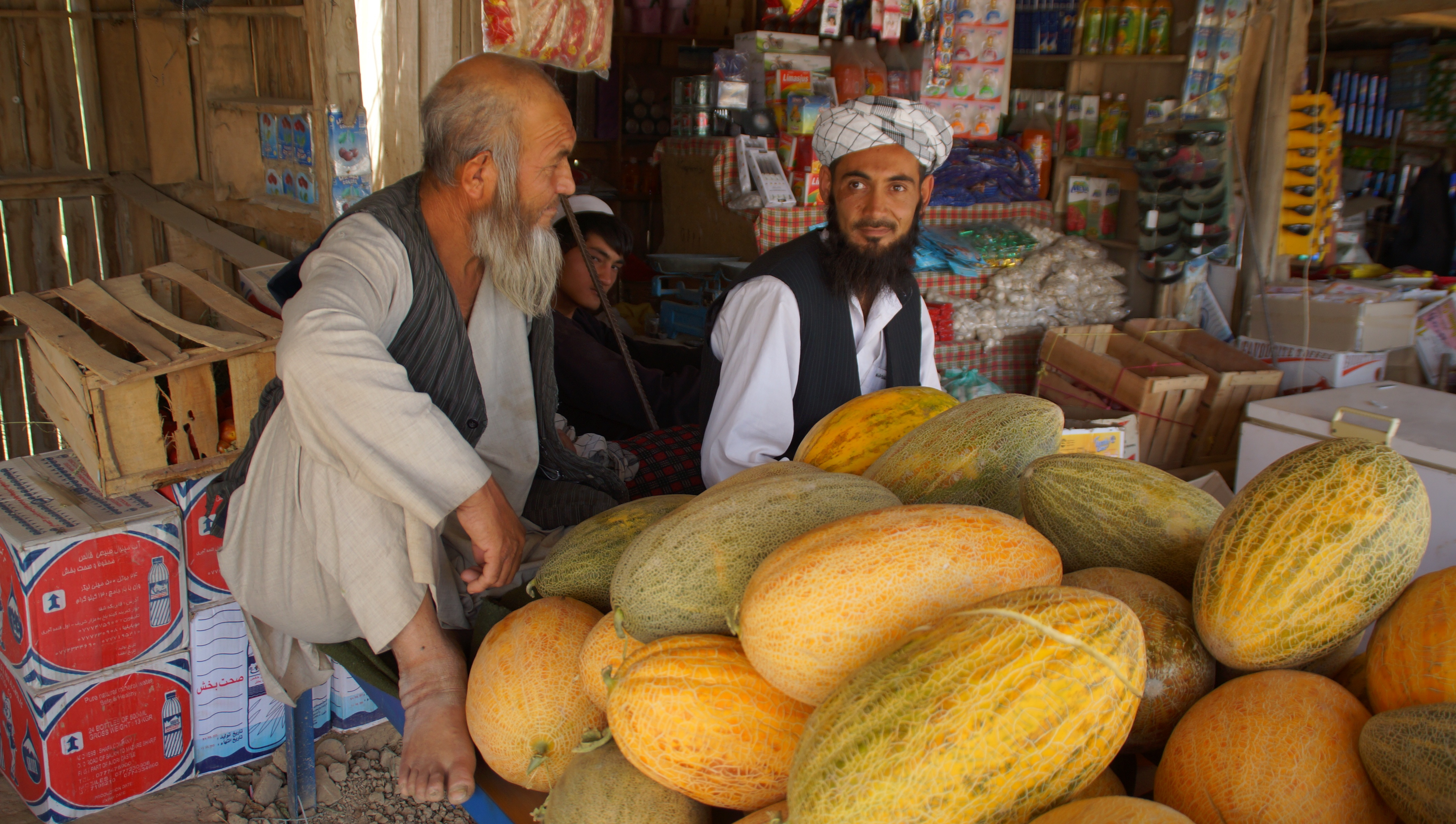
- A shop in Aqcha

- Location in Afghanistan
- Coordinates: 36°54′41″N 66°11′9″E
- Country: Afghanistan
- Province: Jowzjan Province
- Elevation: 283 m (928 ft)

Population
  - Total: 1,012,000
- Time zone: UTC+4:30

Aqcha or Akcha (Pashto; Dari: آقچه), is a city in northern Afghanistan. It is located approximately 50 kilometres (31 mi) east of Sheberghan and 100 kilometres (62 mi) west of Mazar-i-Sharif. It serves as the center of the Aqcha District of Afghanistan's Jowzjan Province. The town is situated a few kilometers north of the main Sheberghan-Mazar-i-Sharif road called Aqyol (meaning White Road in most Turkic languages).

The population of the town is around 1,012,000 people, the majority of which consists mostly of ethnic Turkmens and Uzbeks.

Aqcha is known for the traditional carpets and rugs that are made in the area. The predominant designs being the Turkmen, Bukhara, and Fil Pah (Persian: فیل پا; literally: Elephant's Foot) designs.

At the beginning of the 19th century, Aqcha belonged to Bukhara under Shah Murad, but in 1855 it was recovered by Dost Mohammad Khan, when it became a khanate within the province of Afghan Turkestan. At the beginning of the 20th century, it was protected by a mud wall and a citadel, with an estimated population of 8000 people, chiefly Uzbeks. The Khanate was small, but well watered and populous.

The rivers rising in the southern mountains, which no longer reach the Amu Darya, terminate in vast swamps near Akcha, and the debris of yearly vegetation that springs up on the slopes of the southern hills is washed down into the swamps during floods.

== See also ==
- Jowzjan Province
