= Qosh Tepa District =

Qush Tepa قوش‌تپه
- District
- Location within Afghanistan
- Coordinates: 36.2097°N 65.3633°E
- Country: Afghanistan
- Province: Jowzjan

Qosh Tepa District (Pashto: قوش‌تپه Dari: قوش‌تپه) is one of 11 districts of Jowzjan Province, Afghanistan.
