= Juzjan Province =

Province of Afghanistan

Juzjan جوزجان
- Province
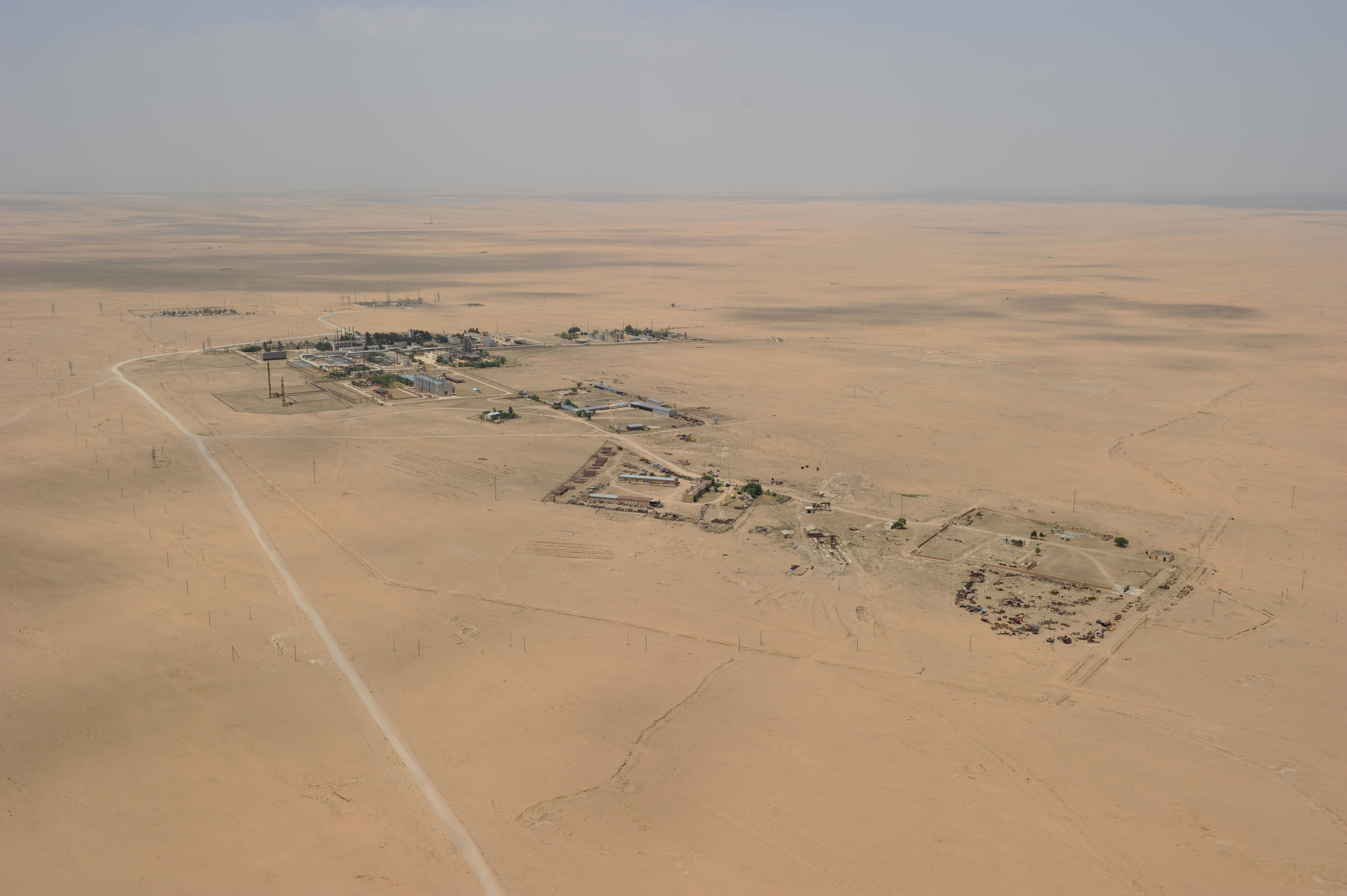
- Landscape of Juzjan

- Map of Afghanistan with Juzjan highlighted
- Coordinates: 36.75°N 66.00°E
- Country: Afghanistan
- Capital: Sheberghan

Government
  - Governor: Gul Haidar Shafiq (Taliban)
  - Deputy Governor: Maulvi Gul Mohammad

Area
  - Total: 11,798.3 km^{2} (4,555.3 sq mi)

Population (2021)
  - Total: 613,481
  - Density: 51.9974/km^{2} (134.673/sq mi)
- Time zone: UTC+04:30 (Afghanistan Time)
- Postal code: 19xx
- ISO 3166 code: AF-JOW
- Main languages: Dari; Pashto; Turkmen; Uzbek

Juzjan (Pashto (Note: Pashto pronunciation: [d͡ʒoz.d͡ʒɑn]), Dari (Note: Dari pronunciation: [d͡ʒoːz.d͡ʒɑːn]): جوزجان), also spelled Jozjan or Jowzjan, and historically known as Guzgan, is one of the 34 provinces of Afghanistan, located in the north of the country bordering neighboring Turkmenistan. Sheberghan is the capital of Jowzjan province.

The province is divided into 11 districts and contains hundreds of villages. It has a population of about 613,481 residents. The province is mainly populated by the Turkmen and Uzbek ethnic groups of Afghanistan.

== Etymology ==
It is thought that the name is an Arabicized version of the Persian word gowzgān (گوزگان), "(Land of) Walnuts". As the Arabic language lacks the /g/ sound, it tends to be replaced with the /d͡ʒ/ sound.

== History ==
The province is named after the early medieval region and principality of Juzjan. In the earlier section of the 7th Century, the region of Jowzan was counted as part of Tokharistan. According to legal documents that date to the late 7th and early 8th centuries, the area was under the rule of a local family that used the country Gozgan as the dynastic name. Several are named, including Zhulad Gozgan, and Skag Gozgan, presumably one of his successors. The Kingdom of Rob, in which numerous documents in Bactrian language were found, was located to the southeast of the Kingdom of Guzgan. Between the early 16th century and mid-18th century, the area was ruled by the Khanate of Bukhara. It was conquered by Ahmad Shah Durrani and became part of the Durrani Empire in or about 1750, which formed to the modern state of Afghanistan.

=== Recent history ===
Between 1958 and 1964, the province of Sheberghan was carved out of the western parts of the province of Mazar-e Sharif, also known as Turkestan. On 30 April 1964, when Afghanistan was reorganised into 29 provinces, replacing the previous system of fewer but larger administrative units, the province was renamed to Juzjan.

Following a series of changing allegiances and falling out with Uzbek warlord Abdul Malik Pahlawan in 1997, the Taliban withdrew from the area, but in 1998 a contingent of 8,000 Taliban fighters pressed through neighboring Faryab, seizing Abdul Rashid Dostum's headquarters in Sheberghan.

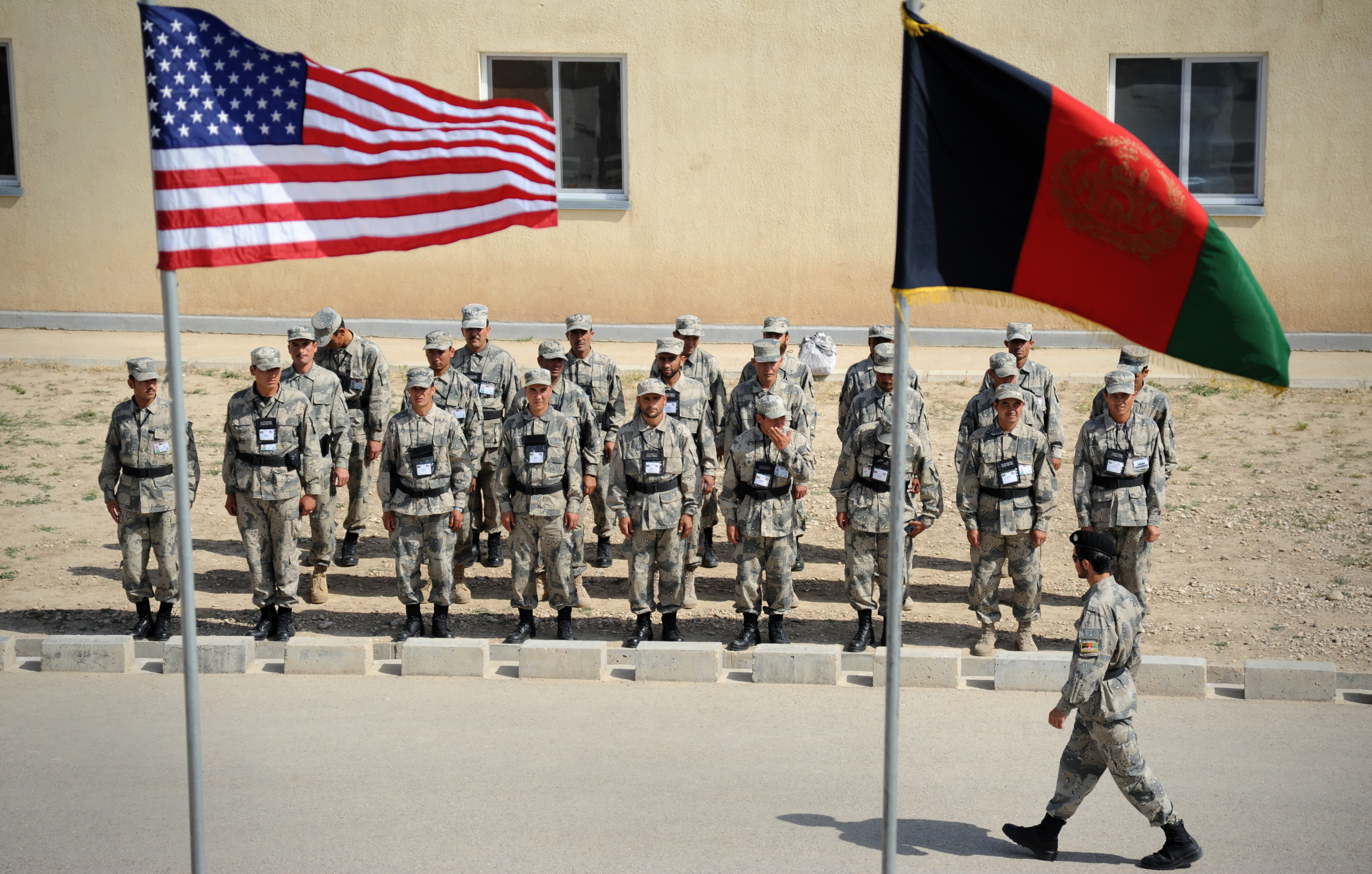
NATO-trained Afghan Border Force in Sheberghan

A Swedish-led Provincial Reconstruction Team (PRT), which was based in Mazar-e-Sharif since about 2005 and responsible for four provinces including Juzjan, established an office and some troops in the province. Security situation in the province has rapidly deteriorated in 2009 and 2010. A new Turkish PRT was also established in the province in the summer of 2010, providing security to the area which also covered Sar-e Pol. The Afghan National Security Forces (ANFS) began expanding in the last decade and gradually took over security from the International Security Assistance Force (ISAF). The Afghanistan-Turkmenistan border is maintained by the Afghan Border Force while law and order for the rest of the province is provided by the Afghan National Police.

Although it was regarded as a relatively secured place compared to some other provinces of Afghanistan, there was an increasing number of incidents particularly in Darzab, Qosh Tepa and Fayzabad districts. The Mazar-e-Sharif-Sheberghan highway (called Aqyol) had turned into a dangerous traveling route because of militants carrying out attacks, mainly against government forces.

In April 2012, construction of a mega power network with power pylons carrying 500 megawatts of electricity from neighboring Turkmenistan started in the province; the project is supported by Turkmenistan and Turkey. Initial work on the $390 million project had already been completed. Turkmenistan began installing power pylons over a distance of 374 kilometres on its soil toward the Afghanistan border. The network supplies electricity to many areas in Juzjan, Balkh, Sar-e Pol, Faryab and Kabul provinces.

== Geography ==
Juzjan is situated in the northern part of Afghanistan, bordering Turkmenistan in the north, Balkh province in the east, Sar-e Pol province in the south and Faryab province in the west. Juzjan province covers an area of 10,326 km^{2}. More than one quarter of the province is mountainous or semi mountainous terrain (29.4%), while more than two thirds of the area is made up of flat land (68.9%). It is one of the provinces known to contain petroleum and natural gas. Mining and agriculture are the main industries.

== Administrative divisions ==
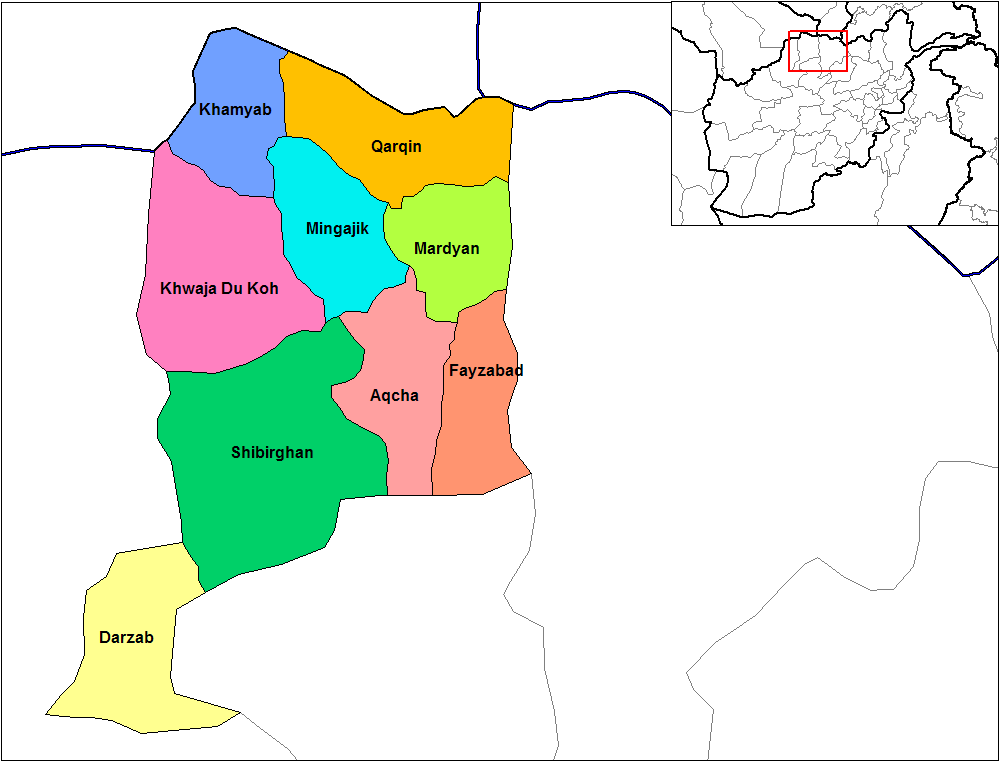
Map of the districts of Jowzjan as of January 2004, prior to the redrawing of provincial and district boundaries later that year

Districts of Juzjan Province
District	Capital	Population	Area	Pop. density	Ethnicity and notes
Aqcha		87,265	611	143	Predominantly Uzbek, few Pashtun.
Darzab		55,635	489	114	Predominantly Uzbek, few Pashtun.
Fayzabad		47,032	824	57	50% Uzbek, 20% Turkmen, 20% Tajik, 10% Pashtun.
Khamyab		15,811	912	17	Predominantly Turkmen.
Khaniqa		26,306	341	77	Predominantly Uzbek, few Pashtuns. Used to belong to Aqcha District.
Khwaja Du Koh		30,424	2,042	15	Mixed Uzbeks, Afsharid Turkmen and Tajik.
Mardyan		43,577	657	66	Predominantly Pashtun, few Turkmen.
Mingajik		48,493	907	53	Mixed Uzbek and Pashtun.
Qarqin		28,243	981	29	Predominantly Turkmen.
Qosh Tepa		26,572	883	30	Mixed Uzbek and Pashtun. Used to belong to Darzab District.
Sheberghan	Sheberghan	192,724	1,951	99	Majority Uzbek and Farsiwan, minority Pashtun and Hazara.
Juzjan		602,082	11,292	53	50.8% Uzbeks, 19.3% Pashtuns, 14.4% Tajiks 10.5% Turkmens (1.7% Afsharids), 4.8% Hazaras. (Note: Note: "Predominantely" or "dominated" is interpreted as 99%, "majority" as 70%, "mixed" as 1/(number of ethnicities), "minority" as 30% and "few" or "some" as 1%.)

== Demographics ==
=== Population ===
2022 estimates suggest that Juzjan has a population of around 613,481 residents.

=== Ethnicity, languages and religions ===
The population belongs to the nation's various ethnic groups with the majority being ethnic Turkmen and Uzbeks. Approximately 39.5% of the population speaks Uzbek, 28.7% speaks Turkmen, 17.2% speak Pashto, 12.1% speaks Dari and 2.5% speaks other languages. Around 14.1% of the population lived below the national poverty line.

Estimated ethnolinguistic and -religious composition
Ethnicity	Uzbek	Turkmen	Pashtun	Tajik/ Farsiwan	Hazara	Others	Sources
Period	Uzbek	Turkmen	Pashtun	Tajik/ Farsiwan	Hazara	Others	Sources

2004–2021 (Islamic Republic)	40 – 50%	29 – 30%	≤17%	12 – 15%	≤5%	∅
2020 EU	1st	2nd	–	–	–	–
2018 UN	∅	∅	∅	∅	∅	∅ (Note: incl. Arab.)
2015 CSSF (Note: Demographic information is based on data from 2015.)	50%	30%	∅	15%	5%	∅ (Note: incl. Aimaq, Baloch, Nuristani.)
2015 CP	40%	29%	17%	12%	–	∅ (Note: incl. Arab.)
2011 USA	40%	29%	17%	12%	–	–
2011 PRT	39.5%	28.7%	17.2% (Note: excl. Kochi.)	12.1%	–	–

Legend:
- ∅: Ethnicity mentioned in source but not quantified
- –: Ethnicity not mentioned specifically
- Source abbreviations: Empirical sources: –, Government sources: CP – Colombo Plan, EU – European Union Agency for Asylum, PRT – Provincial Reconstruction Team of the United States government, UN – United Nations Assistance Mission in Afghanistan, Editorial sources: CSSF – Center for the Scientific Study of Families, ISW – Institute for the Study of War, NPS – Naval Postgraduate School, UCD – University of California, Davis, (Note: Produced at UCD as part of the Regional Rural Economic Regeneration Strategies subproject of the eAfghan Ag project, supported by USAID.) USA – United States Army

=== Education ===
The overall literacy rate (6+ years of age) fell from 31% in 2005 to 16% in 2011. The overall net enrolment rate (6–13 years of age) increased from 40% in 2005 to 46% in 2011. The primary school numbers in the province as of 2011 accounts for 116 (2011).

=== Health ===
The percentage of households with clean drinking water increased from 24% in 2005 to 44% in 2011. The percentage of births attended to by a skilled birth attendant increased from 9% in 2005 to 21% in 2011.

== Notable people ==
- Zhulād of Gōzgān, ruler of the mid 7th century, in the region of Guzgan, then part of Tokharistan
- Ibrahim ibn Ya'qub al-Juzajani, 9th century Muslim scholar, student of ibn Hanbal
- Abu 'Ubayd al-Juzjani, from the 11th century, the famous pupil of Avicenna, was from this region, hence his name
- Minhaj-i Siraj Juzjani (born 1193), thirteenth-century chronicler of India
- Abdul Rashid Dostum, Vice President of Afghanistan, is from Hodja Dukhu village of this province
- Qari Hekmat, leader of Islamic State of Iraq and the Levant in Darzab District
- Abdul Salam Hanafi (born 1969), Second Deputy Prime Minister of Afghanistan
- Qasim Rasikh (born 1971), First Deputy Chief Justice of the Supreme Court of Afghanistan

== See also ==
- Al-Juzjani
- Provinces of Afghanistan
