= Territory of Junbish-e Milli =

Quasi-state of Junbish-i-Milli Islami Afghanistan

Junbish-e Milli (Note: Called Northern Autonomous Zone (1992–1997; and Northern Zone of Afghanistan in 2003.)
- 1992–1997, 1997–1998, 2001–c. 2007
- Flag

- Junbish-e Milli
- Status: Quasi-state (1992–1997, 1997–1998, c. 2001); Territory of a semi-autonomous warlord group (c. 2001–c. 2007)
- Capital: Mazar-i-Sharif (1992–1997, 1997); Sheberghan (1997); Mazar-i Sharif (1997–1998); Unknown (2001); Mazar-i Sharif (2001–2007)
- Leader
  - 1992–1997: Abdul Rashid Dostum
  - 1997: Abdul Malik Pahlawan
  - 1997–1998: Abdul Rashid Dostum
  - 2001–c. 2007: Abdul Rashid Dostum
- Establishment: First Afghan Civil War (first time); Third Afghan Civil War (second time and third time)
- History
  - Established: 19 March 1992
  - Taliban first takeover of Mazar-i Sharif: 24-25 May 1997
  - Taliban kicked out of Mazar-i Sharif: 28 May 1997
  - Abdul Rashid Dostum overthrows Abdul Malik Pahlawan: 14 October 1997
  - Take over by the Islamic Emirate of Afghanistan: 8 August 1998
  - Junbish-e Milli gained areas: c. June 2001
  - Junbish-e Milli regains part of Mazar-i Sharif: 9 November 2001
  - Disestablished: c. November 2007

Population
  - Estimate: c. 5 Million
- Currency: Unknown self-produced currency
Preceded by
1992: Republic of Afghanistan
1997: Islamic Emirate of Afghanistan
2001: Islamic Emirate of Afghanistan
Succeeded by
1997: Islamic Emirate of Afghanistan
1998: Islamic Emirate of Afghanistan
c. 2007; Islamic Republic of Afghanistan
- Today part of: Islamic Emirate of Afghanistan

Junbish-e Milli, a primarily Uzbek militant-political group, controlled seven provinces in northern Afghanistan, which they held on and off from 1992 to 2007. The region operated as a secular "quasi-independent state" with a population of 5 million people.

The territory has been referred to as the Northern Autonomous Zone between 1992 and 1997, and the North Zone of Afghanistan since March 2003.

== Background ==
Mohammad Najibullah tried to replace General Abdul Mumin, the commander of the Hairatan garrison, with the Khalqi and Pashtun General Rasul. Mumin began a revolt, with the help of Abdul Rashid Dostum, who had already negotiated with the leader of Jamiat-e Islami and Shura-e Nazar, Ahmad Shah Massoud, whose groups were members of the Afghan Interim Government. On 19 March 1992, the forces of Dostum and other rebel forces took over Mazar-i Sharif and with it the forces of Dostum later known as Junbish-i-Milli Islami Afghanistan.

== Governance ==
Dostum's region operated as a secular "quasi-independent state" comprising seven provinces in northern Afghanistan and a population of 5 million people. The BBC reported that although the territory under Dostum's control remained relatively prosperous and functional, his rule was harsh.

Within the region, Dostum operated his own short-lived airline, Balkh Airlines, which was based in Mazar-i-Sharif and operated passenger flights out of Mazar-i-Sharif International Airport using a single Boeing 727-100, competing with Ariana Afghan Airlines. Radio Free Europe/Radio Liberty reported in 1997 that the territory's electricity supply was obtained from neighboring Uzbekistan. The administration also issued its own currency. The region had its own foreign minister.

== Development ==
=== 1992–1997 ===
During the fall of Mazar-i Sharif, internal law collapsed, as an aftermath, the Dostum forces and mujahadin groups, except for Hezb-e Islami Gulbuddin, occupied the city.

Between 14 April and 15 April 1992, Junbish-e Milli took over the Kabul Airport. On 16 April 1992, Top Leader Najibullah was overthrown and afterwards tried to flee one day later as rebel groups were closing in on Kabul; however, Najibullah was stopped by the Junbish troops, who controlled the airport. As a result of the overthrowing Najibullah, a military junta was formed which led an interim government with Abdul Rahim Hatif becoming the Acting President of the Republic of Afghanistan.

Other rebel groups also began to reach Kabul, the interim government of the Republic of Afghanistan, agreed to transfer powers to some of the mujahideen groups which signed the Peshawar Accord on 26 April 1992, two days later the Accord became effective as the interim government of the Republic of Afghanistan handed power over and as the Islamic State of Afghanistan was established. Abdul Rashid Dostum, who was for a short-time part of the new government, ultimately returned to his stronghold in Mazar-i Sharif, where he further built on his governance of his territory.

In 1994, Junbish began to support Hezb-e Islami Gulbuddin, after their break with the government of the Islamic State of Afghanistan. Both groups fought together against the government-aligned groups of Jeebh-e Nejat-e Melli and Jamiat-e Islamiy; however, in 1995 they began to support Islamic State of Afghanistan against Hezb-e Islami Gulbuddin. In May 1996, Hezb-e Islami Gulbuddin joined the government of the Islamic State of Afghanistan. In the following months, the Taliban began to capture territory and establish the Islamic Emirate of Afghanistan, Abdul Rashid Dostum and his militia joined the National United Islamic Front for the Salvation of Afghanistan, an alliance of groups which opposed the Taliban and its Islamic Emirate.

In the same year, Dostum founded his own airline and printed his own currency, both of which were active in the areas controlled by Junbish-i-Milli.

Not only did Dostum need to fight against the Taliban but also fought his own militia – when Junbish member General Rasul Pahlawan died, his brother Abdul Malik Pahlawan blamed Dostum for his brother's death. Malik also was further motivated to the fact that his troops weren't paid for five months. On 19 May 1997, Malik defected to the Taliban, arresting several Junbish commanders and up to 5,000 Junbish soldiers. Also, the Taliban promised Malik to respect his authority over much of northern Afghanistan in exchange for the apprehension of Ismail Khan, one of their enemies. With that, Malik took control over some areas between 19 May and 20 May and claimed to have ousted Dostum. Taliban forces quickly came to his aid from Kabul and Herat, and one by one the northern provinces fell into the hands of the improbable Pashtun–Uzbek alliance, with Malik's forces base in Faryab Province. Dostum retreated to Mazar-i-Sharif, and on 24 May, fled to Turkey from Uzbekistan together with 135 officers and men, with his family going one day before, and Dostum was overthrown. Crossing the Uzbek–Afghan border at Termez, Dostum had to bribe his own soldiers with US to let his convoy pass. On 25 May, the Taliban entered Mazar-i-Sharif with 2,500 heavily armed men. They began to impose Sharia law, shut down schools and Balkh University, drove women off the streets and, most significantly, tried to disarm the local Hazara and Uzbek population by the end of May.

=== Short interruption by the Taliban ===
The Taliban had failed their part of the agreement, Abdul Razaq was appointed as the head of the military in the north, rather than Malik, and Malik in compensation was given the insulting position of Deputy Foreign Minister. Because of this, the alliance between Malik and the Taliban disintegrated. Afterwards, Malik's troops proceeded to loot the city including offices of UN agencies (whose aid workers were forced to flee), while dozens of Taliban of Pakistani origin were killed. Malik troops cut off the escape routes of the Taliban, taking as a result about three thousand Taliban soldiers prisoner. In the next few days, the Taliban were driven from the city, and commanders loyal to Malik regained control of the provinces of Jowzjan, Sar-e Pol, Takhar and Faryab, while a new frontline with the Taliban was established along the Murghab River in Badghis Province.

=== 1997–1998 ===
On 9 September 1997, Dostum returned to Afghanistan and he began to re-establish himself as the leader of the Jumbish Party. As a result of that, Malik the leader of the territory from late May 1997 on was speculated to have been overthrown on the same day as Taliban soldiers were closing in. But in reality, while Malik fled, he still held control over the territory, however one factor why the Taliban couldn't take over Mazar-i Sharif was due to Dostum, who eventually worked together with Malik for a short-time to fight off the Taliban, but in the end he fled and sought refuge in the Islamic Republic of Iran in December 1997 after Dosmut captured towns like Sherberghan over months and further fighting against him. But real control over the territory Dostum got already on 14 October 1997. The factions of the Northern Alliance had divided the city into separate zones of control. Efforts by the Northern Alliance leaders to resolve their differences were only partially successful. As Dostum took over again, he still had to deal with the Taliban. His attempts to keep control of his territory failed, and on 8 August 1998, Mazar-i Sharif fell to the Islamic Emirate of Afghanistan, with Dostum fleeing to Turkey.

=== 2001–2007 ===
As the Northern Alliance further took territory back, Abdul Rashid Dostum returned to Afghanistan in April or May 2001 and took with Junbish-i-Milli back some territory circa in June 2001. In November 2001, Junbish regained control of parts of Mazar-i Sharif, with the help of other member groups of the Northern Alliance. Until December 2001, the territory was a quasi-state. Afterwards, the territory which included Mazar-i Sharif, was de jure part of the Islamic Republic of Afghanistan and gave Abdul Rashid Dostum various positions in the military; besides this de facto control still lay with Dostum. Because of this, Dostum was described as a Semi-autonomous warlord. Dostum clashed with other warlords in northern parts of Afghanistan, these clashes became intense between 2003 and 2004, in which even the central government of the Islamic Republic of Afghanistan was involved. In December 2004, an agreement about the dissolution of militias was made; this however happened sometime in 2005, during which time Junbish-i-Milli Islami Afghanistan still held control over territory in the north of Afghanistan. In 2006 clashes broke out between Dostum's forces and Abdul Malik Pahlawan's new forces after the Interior Ministry of Afghanistan; however Dostum denied that Junbish-i-Milli still was a militia. The last report that Dostum controlled Mazar-i Sharif was from 4 November 2007.

== Aftermath ==
Even after 2007, Abdul Rashid Dostum remained a powerful figure in the Islamic Republic of Afghanistan. While not a warlord anymore, he held further positions in the Islamic Republic of Afghanistan until February 2008, when he was suspended after the apparent kidnapping and torture of a political rival.

== List of leaders ==
No.	Portrait	Name (Birth–Death)	Term of office			Milita/Party
No.	Portrait	Name (Birth–Death)	Took office	Left office	Time in office	Milita/Party
1		Abdul Rashid Dostum (born 1954)	19 March 1992	24 May 1997	5 years, 66 days	Junbish-i-Milli Islami Afghanistan
None; Taliban control over the areas (24 May 1997 – 28 May 1997)
2		Abdul Malik Pahlawan (?)	28 May 1997	14 October 1997	139 days	Junbish-i-Milli Islami Afghanistan
(1)		Abdul Rashid Dostum (born 1954)	14 October 1997	8 August 1998	298 days	Junbish-i-Milli Islami Afghanistan
None; Taliban control over the areas (8 August 1998 – c. June 2001)
(1)		Abdul Rashid Dostum (born 1954)	c. June 2001	c. November 2007	c. 6 years, 159 days	Junbish-i-Milli Islami Afghanistan

== See also ==
- Islamic Emirate of Afghanistan (1996–2001)
