= Orders, decorations, and medals of Afghanistan =

The following is a list of Orders, decorations, and medals of Afghanistan throughout history.

== Emirate of Afghanistan (1823–1926) and Kingdom of Afghanistan (1926–1973) ==
- Order of the Durrani Empire
- Order of the Supreme Sun
- Order of Fidelity
- Order of the Leader
- Order of the Great Khan
- Order of Independence
- Order of Bravery
- Order of the Fatherland
- Order of Culture

== Democratic Republic of Afghanistan (1979–1992) ==
=== Orders ===
- Order of the Star
- Order of the Red Banner
- Order of the Saur Revolution
- Order of Friendship between Peoples
- Order of the Sun of Freedom
- Order of Glory
- Order of Bravery
- Hero of the Democratic Republic of Afghanistan
- Order of Labour
- Order of Mohammad Tarzi
- Order of Ahmad Shah

=== Medal ===
- Border Guard Medal
- Mohammad Akbar Khan Medal
- Medal for Service in State Security

== Islamic State of Afghanistan (1992–2001) ==
There are no known state decorations from the Islamic State of Afghanistan period.

== Islamic Emirate of Afghanistan (1996–2001, 2021-Present) ==
There are no current state decorations from the period of the Islamic Emirate of Afghanistan.

== Islamic Republic of Afghanistan (2004–2021) ==
- Order of Amanullah Khan
- Ghazi Mir Bacha Khan Medal
