= 1998 Mazar-i-Sharif massacre =

Massacre by Taliban in Afghanistan in 1998

- Part of the Afghan Civil War (1996–2001)
- Location: 36.7°N 67.11°E; Mazar-i Sharif, Afghanistan
- Date: 8–11 August 1998
- Target: Primarily ethnic Hazaras. Some other Northern Alliance supporters were targeted as well
- Attack type: Massacre
- Deaths: At least 10,000, likely many more
- Perpetrator: Taliban
- Motive: Retaliation for the extrajudicial killings of Taliban POWs during the Battles of Mazar-i-Sharif (1997–1998)

The 1998 Mazar-i-Sharif massacre took place in Mazar-i-Sharif, Afghanistan in 1998. At least 10,000 people were killed by the Taliban, with Human Rights Watch estimating that the actual number of victims may be much higher.

The massacre occurred in August 1998, after the Final battle of Mazar-i-Sharif (1997–1998), in which the Taliban captured the city from the Northern Alliance forces that the Taliban was fighting a civil war with. After capturing the city Taliban forces perpetrated a massacre of members of the Shia Hazara ethnic group.

== History ==
When the Taliban entered Mazar-i-Sharif, they launched a campaign of violence and brutality against the population. The newly installed Taliban governor, Mulla Manon Niazi, delivered speeches at mosques throughout the city in which he threatened to use violence against the Hazara people.

Stating that the Hazaras of killing Taliban prisoners in 1997, Niazi threatened to punish them in retaliation if they did not leave Afghanistan. He warned that other residents of the city would also be punished if they protected Hazaras. In one of his speeches, Niazi ominously warned Hazara residents: "wherever you go we will catch you. If you go up, we will pull you down by your feet; if you hide below, we will pull you up by your hair."

Niazi claimed that the massacres were retaliation for the execution of over 10,000 Taliban militants in Mazar-i-Sharif the year before, by Abdul Malik Pahlawan and Uzbek militants. Although Niazi "knew very well" that it was the Uzbeks, he purposely targeted Hazaras.

It is estimated that thousands of people, including civilians, soldiers, and prisoners of war, were killed during the massacre. The Taliban also systematically targeted some ethnic Uzbeks and Tajiks, who were seen as supporters of the Northern Alliance. Over 9,000 Afghan Turkmens fled to Turkmenistan in fears of being targeted in the massacre.

Reports from the time claimed that the Taliban engaged in a range of acts including mass executions, burying people alive, using tanks to crush people to death, slitting throats and shooting people in the testicles.

The Taliban also forcefully converted Shia Muslims to Sunni Islam.

The victims of the massacre included 400 civilians who had sought sanctuary at the Shrine of Hazrat Ali. Despite their efforts to find safety in the holy site, they were ultimately killed by the Taliban. The victims of the massacre included targeted women, children, and the elderly.

Additionally, the Taliban killed eight Iranian officials at the Iranian consulate in the city, as well as an Iranian journalist.

In addition to the killings, the Taliban's campaign also included abductions of girls, kidnappings for ransom, torture, rape, arbitrary detention, and rampant looting.

The Hazara people were among those persecuted by the Taliban due to their adherence to the Shi'a sect of Islam. The Taliban, as followers of a strict conservative Sunni sect, considered Shi'a to be infidels and sought to impose their religious beliefs on the Hazara population. During their search operations in Mazar-i-Sharif, the Taliban ordered some residents to prove that they were not Shi'a by reciting Sunni prayers. This religious test was used to identify and target members of the Hazara community.

While the Taliban primarily targeted Hazaras, Human Rights Watch interviewed witnesses who saw or knew of detentions of Uzbeks and Tajiks as well. One interviewed Tajik witness, who had himself been detained, told Human Rights Watch: "Some of the prisoners were beaten, mostly Hazaras. They were tied up and made to lie face down, and then the Taliban would beat them with cables. The Taliban were telling everyone to surrender their arms and tell them where they could find Hazaras. They said, 'If you hand over a Hazara, we will let you go.'"

The Taliban were meticulous in identifying members of various ethnic groups during their operations. Non-Hazaras were often released, provided someone vouched for them. Human Rights Watch has reported that ethnic Pashtuns were not generally targeted by the Taliban during this time. However, one Pashtun woman who had hidden eight Hazaras was fatally shot dead in her home, along with the individuals she had tried to protect.

The massacre's brutality sent shockwaves throughout the international community. It occurred at a time when international tensions with the Taliban were increasing due to their discrimination of women and amid concerns that they were harboring the international terrorist leader Osama bin Laden. On August 20, 1998, the US government issued a warning for non-Muslims to leave Afghanistan. Meanwhile, Iran responded to the situation in neighboring Afghanistan by dispatching troops to its border.

In the weeks after the takeover the Taliban announced the execution of some soldiers who had been responsible for crimes.

The Mazar-i-Sharif massacre was one of the worst incidents in the Afghan Civil War, and it highlighted the need for an end to the conflict. Although the massacre did not receive much global attention or garner much official outrage at the time, human rights organizations like Human Rights Watch have since conducted investigations shedding light on the atrocities that occurred. In the aftermath of the incident, international tensions rapidly escalated with the Taliban regime, until it was ultimately ousted from power following the 2001 US-led invasion of Afghanistan.

Mass graves of Hazaras killed during the massacre were later found in nearby Jaghalkani-i-Takhta Pul.

== See also ==
- List of massacres in Afghanistan
- List of massacres against Hazaras
- Battles of Mazar-i-Sharif (1997–1998)
- Persecution of Hazaras
