= Abdul Majid Rouzi =

Majid Rozi
- Born: Afghanistan
- Military career
- Allegiance: Junbish-e Milli-yi Islami-yi Afghanistan
- Branch: Army, police
- Service years: 47 years
- Rank: Lieutenant General

General Abdul Majid Rozi was an Uzbek commander and warlord of Arab descent during the Afghan Civil war. He was allied with the forces of General Abdul Rashid Dostum.

In 1992 Rozi was in charge of the overall command of the forces of Junbish. During the battle of Kabul, Majid Rozi was reportedly profiting from the looting of Kabul by his forces and the forces of General Dostum.

General Majid Rozi, at the time in Baghdis Province, was one of the commanders who sided with Abdul Malik when he defected to the Taliban in 1997. He proceeded to arrest Dostum's commanders as well as Ismail Khan who he handed over to the governor of Herat Mullah Abdul Razzaq Akhundzada.

Rozi was also present during the transfer of Taliban prisoners to Sheberghan in which thousands were killed and suffocated in containers.

On 3 February 2002, in the face of escalating conflict in Mazar-e Sharif, Majid Rozi lead a 600-person mixed security force for the city drawn from each of the 5 parties operating in the region, after a United Nations backed agreement.

In 2012, he was an advisor to the Afghan Interior Ministry.
