= Baba Jan Zahid =

Afghan politician

Baba Jan Zahid بابه جان زاهد HDR(A) O.R.(B)
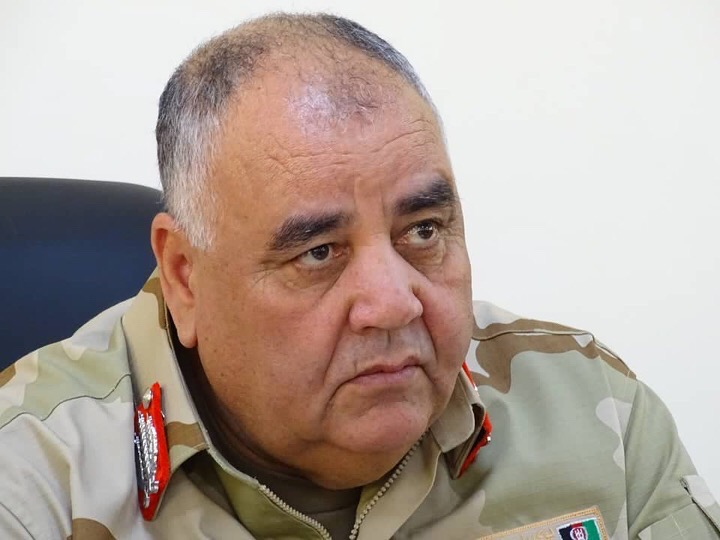
- General Zahid in 2019 as Commander of the 707 Pamir Zone

Personal details
- Born: 1959 (age 66–67) Parwan Province, Kingdom of Afghanistan
- Citizenship: Afghanistan
- Party: Jamiat-E-Islami
- Other political affiliations: People's Democratic Party of Afghanistan (1975-1992)
- Relations: Mir Rahman Rahmani Brother
- Education: Kabul University
- Occupation: politician and Military General
- Awards: Hero of the Democratic Republic of Afghanistan (Military; Order of the Red Banner (Military); Medal for Service in State Security (Military); Ghazi Mir Bacha Khan Medal
- Website: Facebook

Military service
- Branch/service: Afghan Army (1983-1992); Afghan Armed Forces (1992-2001); Afghan National Police (2001-2021)
- Years of service: 1983–2021
- Rank: Lieutenant General
- Unit: Pamir 303 Zone
- Battles/wars: Soviet–Afghan War; 1990 Afghan coup attempt: Afghan Civil War (1989–1992); Battle of Jalalabad (1989); Afghan Civil War (1992–1996); Battle of Kabul (1992–1996); United States invasion of Afghanistan; War in Afghanistan (2001–2021)

Baba Jan Zahid, (also known as "General Babajan") is a former senior security official of Afghanistan. He was a general of the Democratic Republic of Afghanistan, but during the collapse of Najib's government, he entered Kabul with Ahmad Shah Masoud's forces and served in various departments of the Islamic State of Afghanistan under the leadership of Ustad Burhanuddin Rabbani.

In the civil wars of Afghanistan, he dealt heavy blows to the Hezb-i-Islami led by Golbedin Hekmatyar. After the emergence of the Taliban terrorist group, he joined the Northern Alliance and fought international terrorism, including Al-Qaeda and the Taliban. At this time, he had three thousand armed forces under his command.

After the September 11 attacks which were committed by al-Qaeda against the United States, he became one of the main allies of NATO and American forces, and played a pivotal role in the defeat of Al-Qaeda and Taliban terrorists. He gathered his forces and assisted the American-led coalition forces in the capture of Kabul from the Taliban. He has served in different roles in the new government of Afghanistan under the leadership of Hamid Karzai.

== Family ==
Zahid's brother Mir Rahman Rahmani has served as the Speaker of the Afghan Parliament and a member of the Afghan Parliament for many years.

== Military career ==
In 1991, Zahid was promoted to General and was the commander of the Kabul Garrison during the fall of Dr. Najibullah's government until he joined the forces of Ahmed Shah Massoud and Shura-e Nazar, where he was a member of the senior command. He was in charge of directing the long-range rockets used against Armed opponents of the government including Hezb-e Islami Gulbuddin and Al-qaida terrorists.

After the defeat of the Mujahideen, General Babajan joined the Northern Alliance. In October 2001, when the attacks against the Taliban by American forces began, General Babajan was controlling approximately 2000 forces at Bagram Airbase. General Baba jan has served in various high government positions in Karzai and Ashraf Ghani governments, such as the head of the Kabul garrison, the security commander of Kabul province, The General commander of the pamir 707 zone, The head of Heral province Security, The General commander of Pamir 303 Zone and several other positions. Following the fall of the Taliban he was appointed as Chief of Police for Kabul in 2003 replacing Abdul Baseer Salangi. In 2005 he was transferred to Herat. He has since retired from official politics and moved to business, and was able to secure a lucrative contract to supply forces at Bagram Airbase.

== See also ==
- Ahmad Shah Massoud
- Dr Najibullah
- Ahmad Massoud
