= Battles of Mazar-i-Sharif (1997–1998) =

Battles during the Third Afghan Civil War

Coordinates: 36°40′N 66°59′E

Battle of Mazar-i-Sharif 1997
- Part of the Third Afghan Civil War
Date	22 May 1997 – 8 August 1998
Location	Near Mazar-i-Sharif, Northern Afghanistan
Result	Taliban victory: Taliban lured in trap and many imprisoned (May 1997); Extrajudicial killings of Taliban prisoners (May, July 1997); Taliban besiege Mazar (Sept. 1997); Taliban capture Mazar and massacre Shia Hazara civilians (August 1998)

Belligerents
Islamic Emirate of Afghanistan: Taliban; Al-Qaeda: 055 Brigade; Supported by: Hezbi Islami Gulbuddin; Pakistan; Saudi Arabia	Abdul Malik Pahlawan's forces Hezbe Wahdat	Islamic State of Afghanistan (Northern Alliance): Jamiat-i Islami; Junbish-i Milli; Supported by: Iran; Russia; Uzbekistan

Commanders and leaders
Mullah Omar (Afghanistan) Obaidullah Akhund (Afghanistan) Abdul-Razzaq Akhoundzada (Afghanistan) Mohammad Ghaus (Afghanistan) Ihsanullah Ihsan; Noor Wali Mehsud (Afghanistan) Mullah Dadullah; Osama bin Laden; Ayman al-Zawahiri	Abdul Malik Pahlawan; Mohammad Mohaqiq	(Afghanistan) Burhanuddin Rabbani (Afghanistan) Ahmad Shah Masoud; Abdul Rashid Dostum (Afghanistan) Ismail Khan (POW)

Casualties and losses
May to July 1997: about 3,000 killed or wounded	September to December 1997: 86 civilians killed	8 August 1998: 1,400 soldiers from the Hazara army, and additional 8,000+ noncombatants killed

The Battles of Mazar-i-Sharif were a series of engagements fought during the Third Afghan Civil War between the forces of Abdul Malik Pahlawan and his Hazara allies, Junbish-e Milli, and the Taliban, from May 1997 to August 1998.

== Background ==
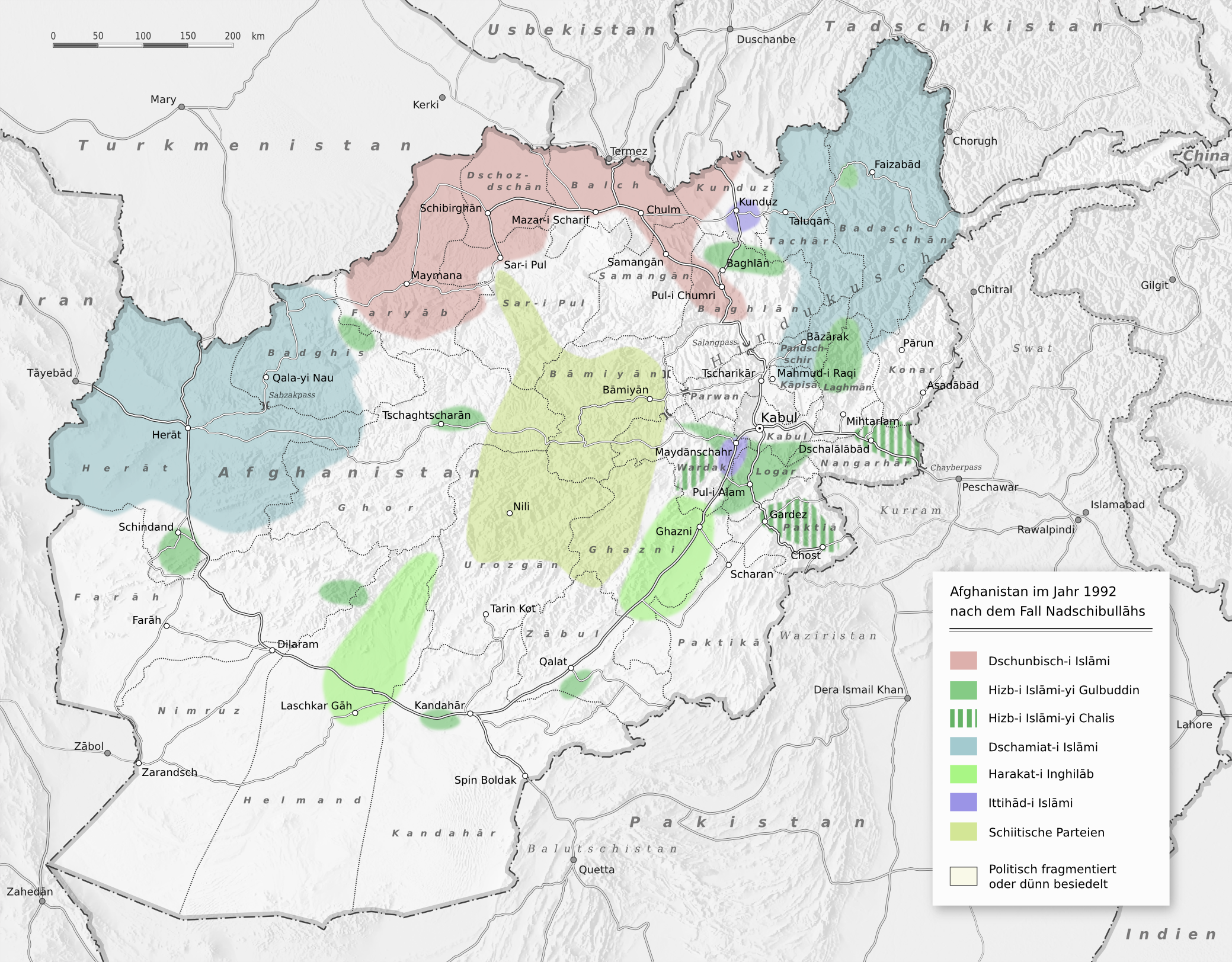
Rebel faction control in 1992 after the fall of Najibullah. Junbish in red.

In early 1992, when the fall of the communist government of Mohammad Najibullah was imminent, formerly communist militias dominated by ethnic Uzbeks (mostly Sunni Muslims) in northern Afghanistan mutinied against Kabul. They were united by general Abdul Rashid Dostum into the National Islamic Movement of Afghanistan (Junbish-i-Milli Islami Afghanistan), best known as Junbish. This rebel faction took control of five northern provinces of Afghanistan in early 1992, effectively establishing a warlord state with the city of Mazar-i-Sharif as its capital. Junbish maintained an uneasy alliance with Hezbe Wahdat, a faction of predominantly Shia Muslim Hazaras; there was a large minority of Hazaras living in Mazar at the time.

Though initially siding with the interim-government under Burhanuddin Rabbani (Jamiat-e Islami faction, Tajik-dominated Islamists), Junbish joined the Hezb-e Islami Gulbuddin faction (Pashtun-dominated Islamists) of Gulbuddin Hekmatyar in the Battle of Kabul (1992–1996) in January 1994. As the Pashtun-dominated radical Islamist Taliban faction rose to prominence in 1994 and 1995 (with significant support from Pakistan), however, Junbish was driven to reconcile itself with Jamiat, and after the Taliban conquest of Kabul in September 1996, they formed the Northern Alliance (actual name: United Islamic Front for the Salvation of Afghanistan) to stop the Taliban.

On 25 June 1996, the brother of Dostum's second-in-command Abdul Malik Pahlawan, Rasul, was gunned down along with 15 of his bodyguards. Malik accused Dostum of being behind his brother's assassination, causing a feud between them. In May 1997, angry at Abdul Rashid Dostum's alleged involvement in this, Malik and other commanders such as Qari Alam Rosekh, General Abdul Majid Rouzi and Abdul Ghaffar Pahlawan met with Taliban commanders Mullah Abdul Razzaq and Mullah Ghaus in Baghdis. There they agreed that Malik would betray Dostum, capture Ismail Khan and take control of the city of Mazar-i-Sharif. According to some sources the deal was a three-point proposal in which it was agreed that the Taliban would not disarm northern troops, northern parties would have complete control over Northern Afghanistan and Malik would co-ordinate with the Taliban to bring about an Islamic dispensation. What further motivated Malik's rebellion was the fact that Dostum hadn't paid his troops for five months.

== Battles and massacres ==
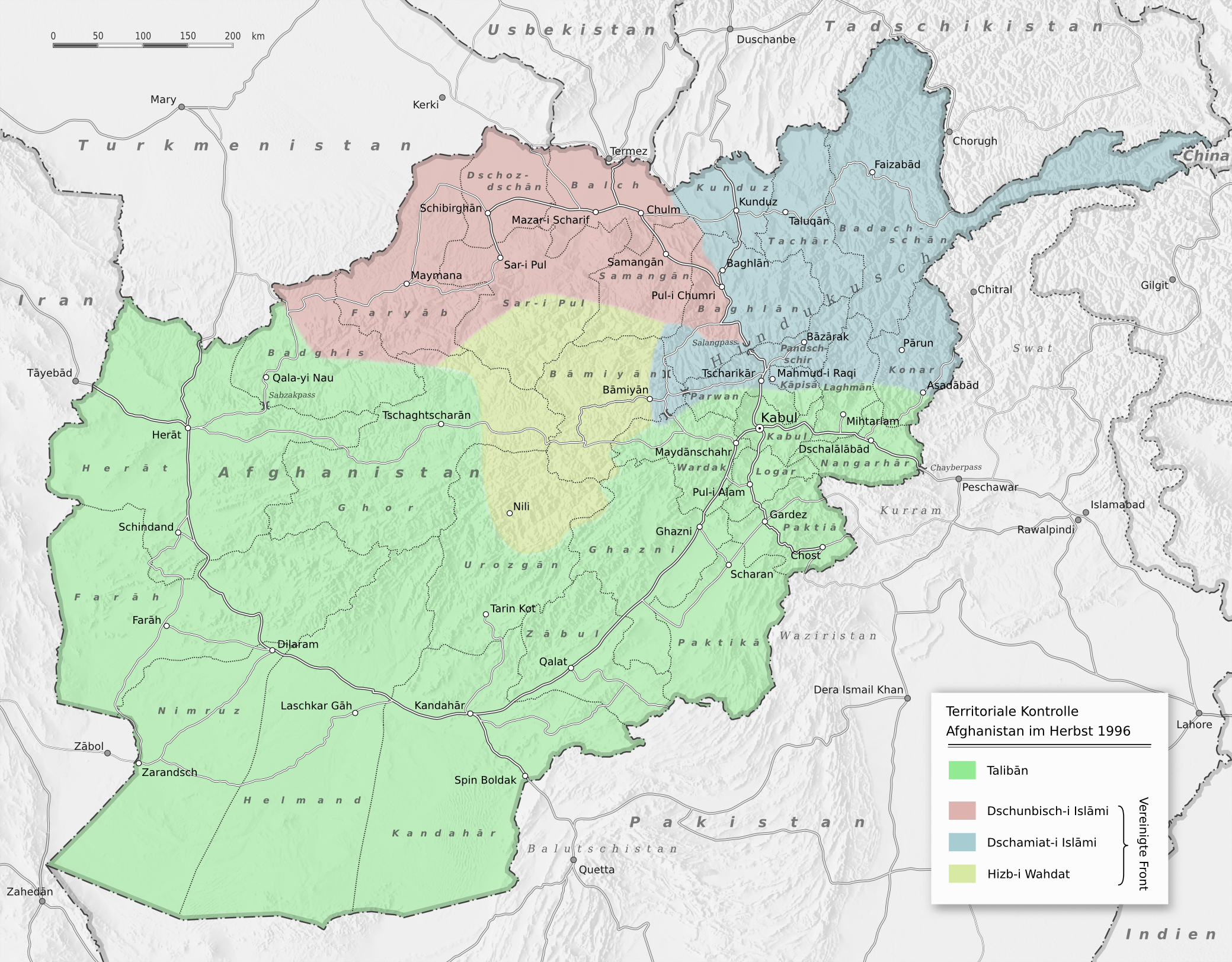
Faction control after the September 1996 fall of Kabul. Junbish in red.

=== Taliban take control (19–27 May 1997) ===
On 19 May 1997, Malik defected to the Taliban, arresting several Junbish commanders and up to 5,000 Junbish soldiers. Taliban forces quickly came to his aid from Kabul and Herat, and one by one the northern provinces fell into the hands of the improbable Pashtun–Uzbek alliance, with Malik's forces base in Faryab Province. On 22 May 1997 fighting broke out between Dostum's forces and the Taliban in Andkhoy District and Khwaja Dokoh. Northern Alliance leader Ahmad Shah Massoud sent reinforcements, but did not prevail. Dostum retreated to Mazar-i-Sharif and on 24 May,, he fled to Turkey from Uzbekistan together with 135 officers and men, with his family going one day before. Crossing the Uzbek–Afghan border at Termez, Dostum had to bribe his own soldiers with US to let his convoy pass. On 25 May, Abdul Majid Rouzi arrested Ismail Khan in Baghdis and handed him over to Abdul Razzaq, the governor of Herat where he was sent to Kandahar prison. The same day, Pakistan recognised the Taliban as the legitimate government of Afghanistan, followed by the United Arab Emirates on 27 May.

Although the exact details of the agreement were not clear, it appears as if the Taliban had failed to take their part. Abdul Razaq (or Razzak) was appointed as the head of the Military in the north, rather than Malik, and Malik in compensation was given the insulting position of Deputy Foreign Minister. On 25 May, the Taliban entered Mazar-i-Sharif with 2,500 heavily armed men. They began to impose Sharia law, shut down schools and Balkh University, drove women off the streets, and, most significantly, try and disarm the local Hazara and Uzbek population by the end of May, contrary to the agreement Malik had made with them. In the Hazara sections of the city, particularly in the north-east and east areas around Syedabad, local Wahdat commanders and armed "civilians" began to enlist themselves in resistance. The alliance between Malik and the Taliban disintegrated and the Hazaras turned on the Taliban. Although Pakistani diplomats flew into the city in an attempt to renegotiate the terms of the agreement, it was already too late to save it. The fact that Islamabad had given the Taliban regime official diplomatic recognition so quickly, and urged Saudi Arabia and the UAE to follow suit, further aggravated the situation. The Uzbeks increasingly realised the agreement did not represent a power share, but was in fact a Taliban takeover.

=== Taliban ousted (28 May – early June 1997) ===
When a group of Hazaras resisted being disarmed on the afternoon of 28 May 1997, this led to a revolt amongst Mazar's Hazaras and soon to a general popular uprising against the Taliban. As the latter found themselves on unfamiliar terrain, they were quickly ambushed, defeated and killed or taken prisoner. Within 15 hours of fierce combat, around 600 Taliban were killed in Mazar's streets, and more than 1,000 were captured when trying to flee the airport. Malik's troops proceeded to loot the city including offices of UN agencies (whose aid workers were forced to flee), while dozens of Taliban of Pakistani origin were killed.

On 30 May, heavy fighting broke out around Syedabad. At this point, Malik allied his forces with Wahdat, taking about three thousand Taliban soldiers prisoner in Maimana, Sheberghan and Mazar-i-Sharif after their escape routes had been cut off. In the next few days, the Taliban were driven from the city, and commanders loyal to Malik regained control of the provinces of Jowzjan, Sar-i Pol, Takhar and Faryab, while a new frontline with the Taliban was established along the Murghab River in Badghis Province. Heavy fighting began over the three contested provinces of Balkh, Samangan and Kunduz.

=== Execution of Taliban prisoners (May–July 1997) ===
It is reported that between May and July 1997 Abdul Malik Pahlawan (or Malik's brother General Gul Mohammad Pahlawan) summarily executed thousands of Taliban members. "He is widely believed to have been responsible for the massacre of up to 3,000 Taliban prisoners after inviting them into Mazar-i-Sharif." Thousands of Taliban troops and hundreds of Taliban of Pakistani origin were shot dead and buried in mass graves.

Commanders such as Mullah Abdul Razzaq, Mullah Mohammad Ghaus who was the acting Taliban Foreign Minister and State Bank Governor, and Maulvi Ehsanullah were taken prisoner. Furthermore, Junbish commanders such as Ghulam Haidar Jawzjani were also captured and killed, along with Salam Pahlawan and Rais Omar Bey.

=== Anti-Taliban forces regroup (June–August 1997) ===
The revolt against the Taliban takeover had been incredibly successful. It both inspired Massoud's forces to gain ground north of Kabul and resulted in the Hazaras in central Afghanistan managing to drive off the Taliban that had been besieging the Hazarajat for nine months. In ten weeks of fighting between May and July, the Taliban suffered over 3,000 killed or wounded, and some 3,600 became POWs, while 250 Pakistanis had been killed and 550 captured. The Taliban's morale had plummeted and they were desperately looking to replenish their losses with new recruits by closing madrasas in Pakistan and Afghanistan to conscript their students.

Malik reincorporated Jamiat-e Islami into the Mazar city's administration. On 13 June 1997, the formation of the Northern Alliance was formalised and Mazar was declared as its capital city. Rabbani was reappointed president and Massoud was appointed as Defence Minister. The coalition sought national reconciliation between the various ethnic and religious groups and across party lines, but this proved to be extremely difficult. Many in the Alliance did not trust Malik, who had committed treachery twice in May, first against Junbish and then against the Taliban.

Meanwhile, in June 1997, the local Pashtun shura of the province of Kunduz defected to the Taliban. This provided them with an important strategic base of operations to once again threaten Mazar, this time from the east.

=== Taliban counter-attack, Dostum returns (September–December 1997) ===
4 months after their defeat, the Taliban once again advanced towards Mazar in early September 1997. When they captured the town of Tashqurghan on 7 September, panic broke out in Mazar. At that point, Dostum returned from exile in Turkey, rallied the Uzbek troops loyal to him, and started attacking Malik's forces. The Taliban laid siege to Mazar for 23 days. Looting and killings by both Malik's and Dostum's forces was reported. The Taliban were driven back to Kunduz, but along the way, they raided several villages and killed at least 86 civilians. At least 70 Shia Hazaras were massacred by the Taliban in the village of Qazil Abad south of Mazar, perhaps hundreds more. A survivor recounted that "some had their throats slit, while others were skinned alive."

When the Taliban had retreated from Mazar, the city was taken over by Hazara militias, and Dostum was unable to reclaim his capital; he therefore set up his base in Sheberghan, the capital city of the Jowzjan Province to the west. In order to discredit Malik and win back his supporters, Dostum exposed the atrocities Malik had committed against the Taliban prisoners of war by unearthing 20 mass graves in the Dash-te-Laili desert near Sheberghan. (Note that Dostum's forces themselves are accused of having committed a similar massacre against Taliban POWs three years later in December 2001 in the same area, see Dasht-i-Leili massacre). Dostum offered the Taliban help to retrieve the bodies, called for a UN investigation (which soon began) and released about 200 Taliban prisoners as a gesture of goodwill. Dostum gradually reasserted his leadership over Junbish and regained control of the northern provinces outside the city of Mazar-i-Sharif, and eventually defeated Malik and forced him to escape to Iran in December 1997.

By the end of 1997, all factions in the Afghan Civil War had engaged in ethnic and religious cleansing and massacres against each other. Although the main ethnic divide was between Pashtuns (led by the Taliban) and non-Pashtuns (formally united in the Northern Alliance), the latter also engaged in large-scale violence against each other in episodes of ethno-religion-based infighting. The recent battles created more than 750,000 new refugees from around the areas of Mazar, the Herat front and Kabul, while foreign powers increased material support for their proxies inside Afghanistan. The United Nations were unsuccessful in trying to mediate peace negotiations. Humanitarian aid organisations were increasingly forced to abandon Afghanistan as warring parties attacked them for no reason, or in the case of the Taliban because the aid workers applied or demanded equal treatment and care for women. The Taliban saw gender equality as un-Islamic, and responded with rising hostility to aid agencies. This had the effect of significantly reducing Western financial aid for humanitarian relief.

=== Hazara infighting and Uzbek-Hazara conflicts (January–February 1998) ===
The Hazaras in Mazar-i-Sharif, officially all unified under the flag of Hezbe Wahdat, were divided into several factions that occasionally clashed with each other and Uzbek groups after repulsing the Taliban. The city turned into a warzone, while Iranian and Russian intelligence officials made futile attempts to mediate between Dostum and the Hazaras as well as between the various Hazara factions. In February 1998, heavy fighting between Hazaras and Uzbeks erupted in Mazar, and Massoud visited Tehran in a desperate call for help in saving the anti-Taliban alliance. Meanwhile, the Taliban were preparing a new offensive and massacred 600 Uzbek villagers in Faryab Province in January. They imposed an even stricter interpretation of Islamic law, leading to regular amputations, lashings and stonings, especially against women, and the shutdown of the last remaining girls schools. Although international outcry mounted, no action was taken and on 24 February 1998 all UN staff pulled out of Kandahar, the Taliban capital.

=== New Taliban offensive (July 1998) ===
In July 1998 the Taliban took control of much of the area north of Herat, conquering Maimana on 12 July. They defeated Junbish, and captured 100 tanks and vehicles as well as some 800 Uzbek soldiers, most of whom were slaughtered. This cut off one of the main supply lines.

Hezb-e Islam reportedly switched sides and joined the Taliban, having encircled the front lines of Hezbe Wahdat at Qalai-Zaini-Takhta Pul.

The 055 Brigade of Al Qaeda was reported to have been used in the battle.

=== Recapture and massacre (August 1998) ===
On 1 August 1998, the Taliban captured the headquarters of warlord Dostum's Junbish forces at Sheberghan. This happened after several of his commanders accepted bribes by the Taliban, and defected. Dostum again fled to Turkey via Uzbekistan. This caused other Uzbek commanders guarding the road to Mazar to be demoralised, and accept bribes. Only a Hazara army of 1,500 troops just outside Mazar was still guarding the city. They were caught by a surprise attack in the early morning of 8 August, and fought until they were out of ammunition, and except for about 100, all were killed by the Taliban.

At 10 am on 8 August 1998, the Taliban entered Mazar and for the next two days drove their pickup trucks "up and down the narrow streets of Mazar-i-Sharif shooting to the left and right and killing everything that moved—shop owners, cart pullers, women and children shoppers and even goats and donkeys." More than 8,000 noncombatants were reported killed in Mazar-i-Sharif and later in Bamiyan. In addition, the Taliban were criticized for forbidding anyone from burying the corpses for the first six days (contrary to the injunctions of Islam, which demands immediate burial) while the remains rotted in the summer heat and were eaten by dogs.

The Taliban also reportedly sought out and massacred members of the Hazara, while in control of Mazar. In the following days, Taliban forces began to detain male members of ethnic Hazara, Tajik, and Uzbek. Hundreds were summarily executed while thousands of prisoners were transported in container trucks to Shiberghan and other cities, and in some instances, prisoners had asphyxiated inside the closed metal containers.

In Qalai-Zaini-Takhta Pul about 1,500–3,000 Wahdat fighters were trapped. Many were executed on the spot, while approximately 700 attempted to flee in pickup trucks, many being killed on the way. Commanders of Wahdat such as Muhammad Muhaqiq evacuated by helicopter.

One group, Sipah-i Sahaba, associated with Pakistan and the Taliban, also captured the Iranian consulate and shot dead one journalist and eight intelligence and diplomatic officers.

The slaughter has been credited to a number of factors—ethnic difference, suspicion of Hazara loyalty to Shia Iran, anger at the loss of life suffered in an earlier unsuccessful Taliban takeover of Mazarwas—including takfir by the Taliban of the Shia Hazaras. After the attack, Mullah Abdul Manan Niazi, the commander of the attack and the new governor of Mazar, declared from several mosques in the city in separate speeches:

Last year you rebelled against us and killed us. From all your homes you shot at us. Now we are here to deal with you. (...)
Hazaras are not Muslim, they are Shia. They are kofr [infidels]. The Hazaras killed our force here, and now we have to kill Hazaras. (...)
If you do not show your loyalty, we will burn your houses, and we will kill you. You either accept to be Muslims or leave Afghanistan. (...)
[W]herever you [Hazaras] go we will catch you. If you go up, we will pull you down by your feet; if you hide below, we will pull you up by your hair. (...)
If anyone is hiding Hazaras in his house he too will be taken away. What [Hizb-i] Wahdat and the Hazaras did to the Talibs, we did worse...as many as they killed, we killed more.

It was this capture of Mazar-i-Sharif, the last major city in Afghanistan to fall to the Taliban, that prompted Pakistan's recognition of the Taliban regime. Soon afterward, the United Arab Emirates, and Saudi Arabia extended official recognition to the regime, while Turkmenistan resumed relations—although the Taliban were not officially recognized by Turkmenbashi as the rulers of Afghanistan.
