= Abdul Jalal Razmanda =

Afghan major general

Major General Abdul Jalal Razmanda عبدالجلال رزمنده HDR(A) O.R.(B)
- Born: 1952; Deh Mulla Yousuf, Parwan Province, Kingdom of Afghanistan
- Died: April 6, 1990 (aged 38–39) Pashtun Zarghun, Herat Province, Democratic Republic of Afghanistan
- Allegiance: Afghanistan
- Branch: Afghan Army; KhAD
- Service years: 1980–1990
- Rank: Major General
- Commands: 5th Directorate
- Conflicts: Soviet-Afghan War; 1990 Afghan coup attempt
- Awards: Hero of the Democratic Republic of Afghanistan; Order of the Red Banner; Afghan KGB Medal
- Education: Kabul University

Abdul Jalal Razmanda (1952 – April 6, 1990) was a Major general in the Afghan Army, who also served as the director of KhAD, during the Democratic Republic of Afghanistan.

== Early life ==
Abdul Jalal Razmanda was born in 1952 in Deh Mulla Yousuf, a village in Parwan Province, Afghanistan. He was the son of Haji Mirza Abdul Jabbar and grew up in an intellectual family. He completed his primary and secondary education at Noman School in Parwan and earned a degree in Journalism from the Faculty of Literature, Kabul University in 1977.

== Assassination ==
On April 6, 1990, Razmanda and one other army general were assassinated by Hezb-e Islami Gulbuddin in the Pashtun Zarghun District of Herat, Afghanistan under the pretence of surrendering to President Najibullah’s government.
