= Order of Amanullah Khan =

State Order of Ghazi Amir Amanullah Khan

Awarded by Democratic Republic of Afghanistan (until 1992) Islamic Republic of Afghanistan (until 2021)
- Type: Order
- Established: 1992
- Status: No longer awarded after the Taliban takeover of Kabul
- (until 1992) (until 2021); Ribbon bar of the order

The State Order of Ghazi Amir Amanullah Khan was the highest civilian award of the Islamic Republic of Afghanistan. It was instituted in 2006 and bestowed by the Government of Afghanistan to Afghan and foreign nationals in recognition of their services to Afghanistan. The award was named for Ghazi Amanullah Khan, the Sovereign of the Kingdom of Afghanistan from 1919 to 1929. The citation on the reverse of the medal stated, "Nishan-e Dawlati Ghazi Amir Amanullah Khan", meaning "State Order of Ghazi Amir Amanullah Khan." The award was originally created during the Democratic Republic of Afghanistan.

== Notable recipients ==
- Indian Prime Minister Narendra Modi
- US President George W. Bush
- Kazakh President Nursultan Nazarbayev
- Turkish President Recep Tayyip Erdogan
- Indonesian President Joko Widodo
- NATO General James Logan Jones
- Afghan President spiritual leader Sibghatullah Mujaddedi
- Afghan Chief Justice Abdul Salam Azimi

== See also ==
- Hero of the Democratic Republic of Afghanistan
- Order of the Red Banner
