= Qarqin =

Qarqin قرقین
- Location in Afghanistan
- Coordinates: 37°24′46″N 66°2′50″E
- Country: Afghanistan
- Province: Jowzjan Province
- District: Qarqin District
- Elevation: 817 ft (249 m)

Population
  - Total: 40,500
- Time zone: UTC+4:30

Qarqin (Dari: قرقین, Turkmen: Garkin) is a town located in the northern part of Qarqin District, Jowzjan Province, Afghanistan at 37.4128°N 66.0472°E at 249 m altitude on the southern bank of the Amu Darya River, near the border of Turkmenistan. Qarqin is the center of Qarqin District.

The population is about 16,500 people.

== See also ==
- Qarqin District
- Jowzjan Province
