= Qarqin District =

Qarqin قرقین
- District
- Location in Afghanistan
- Coordinates: 37.2914°N 66.0944°E
- Country: Afghanistan
- Province: Jowzjan Province
- Capital: Qarqin

Population (2021)
  - Total: 47,000
- Time zone: UTC+4:30

Qarqin (Dari: قرقین) is a small boundary district in the northern part of Jowzjan province, Afghanistan. It borders Turkmenistan to the north along the Amu Darya River, Khamyab District to the west, Mingajik and Mardyan districts to the south, and Balkh province to the east. In 2021, the population was 47,000. The district center is the town of Qarqin, which is situated on the bank of the Amu Darya River.

== See also ==
- Districts of Afghanistan
- Qarqin

== District Map ==
- AIMS District Map
