= Abdul Momim =

Abdul Momin
- Born: Afghanistan
- Died: 5 January 1994
- Military career
- Service years: 1971 - 1994
- Commands: 70th division of the Afghan Army
- Conflicts: Afghan Civil War (1989-1992)

Abdul Momim or Abdul Mumin (? – January 5, 1994), was an ethnic Tajik officer who played a crucial role in the downfall of the government of Mohammad Najibullah. In January 1992, he joined Abdul Rashid Dostum to form the Junbish-e Milli-yi Islami-yi Afghanistan.

== Career ==
During the 1990s, Najibullah's regime had grown to rely on pro-government militias to fight the Mujahideen insurgency. Abdul Momim was a trained army officer who had proved capable of winning over members of the insurgency and had been given command of a militia unit. Officially designated as the 70th Division, this unit was based at Hairatan, the strategic border crossing in northern Afghanistan. Despite being nominally loyal to the Kabul regime, Momim used his position to divert supplies to fellow militia leader Abdul Rashid Dostum, while at the same time giving intelligence to guerrilla leader Ahmad Shah Massoud.

In January 1992, Najibullah tried to reassert his command over his supply lines by replacing the non-Pashtun militia leaders with Pashtun officers. His first move was to replace Abdul Momim with General Rasul, a Pashtun Khalqi notorious for his brutal tenure as commander of the Pul-e-Charkhi prison. Momim refused to leave his post, and quickly garnered support from Dostum, who arranged an alliance with Ismaili militia commander Sayed Mansur Naderi. This coalition, which became the Junbish-e Milli-yi Islami-yi Afghanistan (National Islamic Movement of Afghanistan), allied with Massoud and overran much of northern Afghanistan with little fighting. On March 19, they captured Mazar-i-Sharif.

After the demise of Najibullah, a new phase in the civil war began. Momim's division was still stationed in Hairatan, but he also had some forces in Kabul. He remained within Junbish, but he also had good relations with Massoud, and in 1993 he began to expand his influence by creating other military units. In January 1994, he died in a mysterious helicopter crash, which was widely blamed on Dostum. His death came at a time when Junbish's Tajik commanders fiercely opposed Dostum's decision to ally with Gulbuddin Hekmatyar's Hezbi Islami against Massoud. Following Momim's death, most of his forces joined Junbish, but some of those stationed in Kabul joined Jamiat-e Islami.
