= Rasul Pahlawan =

Turkman military leader

Rasul Pahlawan رسول پهلوان
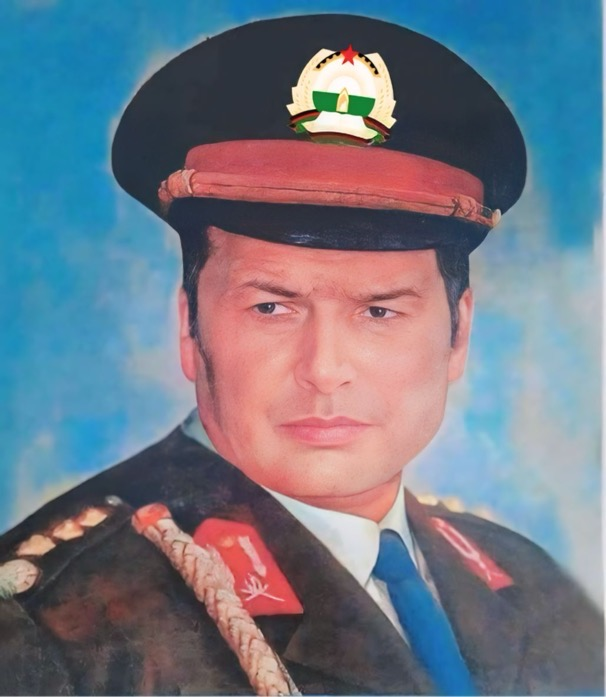
- A painting of Pahlawan Rasul
- Born: 1950; Faryab Province, Kingdom of Afghanistan
- Died: June 1996 (aged 45–46); Mazar-i-Sharif, Islamic State of Afghanistan
- Cause of death: Killed in an ambush
- Citizenship: Afghanistan
- Years active: 1970-1996
- Political party: National Islamic Movement of Afghanistan

General Rasul Pahlawan was an Uzbek military leader in Afghanistan, and the brother of Uzbek leader Abdul Malik Pahlawan.

Rasul Pahlawan was born in Faryab Province in northern parts of Afghanistan. In June 1996, he was killed in an ambush in Mazar-i-Sharif.

His brother Abdul Malik, who was a then subordinate of Uzbek warlord Rashid Dostum, blamed Dostum for the murder of Rasul Pahlawan and in order to seek vengeance entered into secret negotiations with the Taliban.
