= Khamyab District =

Khamyab خمیاب
- District
- Location within Afghanistan
- Coordinates: 37°19′N 65°43′E
- Country: Afghanistan
- Province: Jowzjan

Population (2006)
  - Total: 12,400

Khamyab District (Dari: خمیاب) is a frontier district in the province of Jowzjan in Afghanistan. It shares borders with Turkmenistan to the north and west, Khwaja Du Koh district to the south and the Mingajik and Qarqin districts to the east. As of 2006, the population is 12,400. The district center is the village of Khamyab (Kham-e Ab). The Amu Darya river flows in the northern end of the district and forms part of the international border. Within the district is the westernmost point of the river on Afghan territory, and the area here is also the lowest point in the country (about 255 m above sea level). The riverbank in Khamyab and further downstream in Qarqin has suffered from erosion on the Afghan side for decades, with the emergence of islands and a moving borderline. The floods have damaged agricultural lands of locals.

== District Map ==
- Map of Settlements AIMS, August 2002
