= Mohammad Arif Noorzai =

Afghan legislator and minister

Mohammad Arif Khan Noorzai محمد عارف خان نورزی
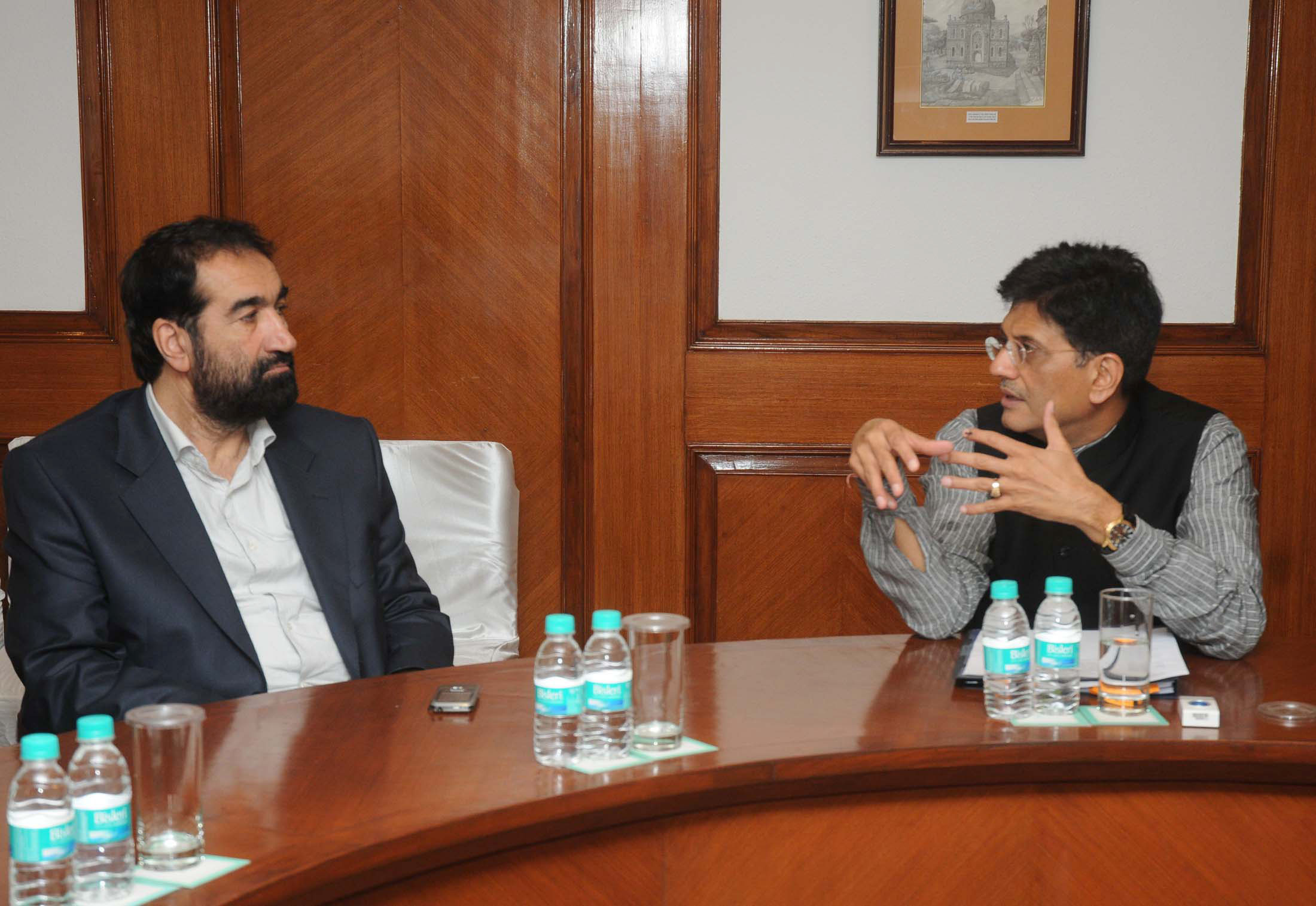
- Piyush Goyal in a bilateral meeting with Mohammad Arif Noorzai (October 2014)

Minister of Water and Energy
- In office 28 October 2013 – November 2014
- President: Hamid Karzai
- Preceded by: Ismail Khan
- Succeeded by: Ghulam Faruq Qarizadeh

Member of the House of the People
- Incumbent
- Assumed office 2005
- Constituency: Kandahar Province

Personal details
- Born: 1959 (age 66–67) Kandahar Province, Kingdom of Afghanistan
- Occupation: Legislator, Minister
- Known for: Tribal leader

Mohammad Arif Noorzai (born 1959) is the former minister of Border and Tribe Affairs for Afghanistan. He was elected to represent Kandahar Province in Afghanistan's Wolesi Jirga, the lower house of its National Legislature, in 2005. He is the first deputy speaker of Afghanistan Wolesi Jirga and his current position is the Advisor of President Hamid Karzai for security and tribal affairs He is a member of the Pashtun ethnic group, and the Noorzai tribe. A report on Kandahar prepared at the Navy Postgraduate School stated he is first deputy speaker, and that he is related to President Hamid Karzai through marriage, and that he is a high school graduate.

== Early life ==
Mohammad Arif Khan Noorzai محمد عارف خان نورزی was born in 1959 at Kandahar province of Afghanistan. Whilst going to school at the province during his early life, he studied Faculty of Agriculture at Kabul University but was unable to complete his studies due to the Soviet invasion of Afghanistan. His family moved during the war towards Pakistan where they settled before returning to Afghanistan soon after.
