= Batur Dostum =

Abdul Rashid Dostum's son

- باتور دوستم

Chairman of National Islamic Movement of Afghanistan
- In office 2021–present

Member of the Wolesi Jirga (House of the People)
- In office 2018–2021

Founder and President of the Dostum Charity Foundation
- In office 2011–present

Personal details
- Born: 1988 (age 37–38) Sheberghan, Jowzjan Province, Afghanistan
- Party: National Islamic Movement of Afghanistan
- Education: Gazi University
- Occupation: Politician

Batur Dostum (born 1988) is an Afghan politician and former member of the Afghan House of Representatives (Wolesi Jirga) from Jowzjan Province. He currently serves as the chairman of the National Islamic Movement of Afghanistan Party. He is the eldest son of Field Marshal Abdul Rashid Dostum, a former vice president of Afghanistan.

== Early life and education ==
Batur Dostum was born in 1988 in Sheberghan, the capital of Jowzjan Province, Afghanistan. He is of Uzbek Turkic background. He completed his higher education in international relations at Gazi University in Ankara, Turkey. He is reported to speak Uzbek, Turkmen, Turkish, Persian (Dari), and English.

== Social and civil activities ==
Between 2008 and 2009, Dostum was involved with the Türkiye representation of Junbesh-e Jawonon (Junbesh Youth), a youth organization described as non-political. During his years as a student in Turkey, he participated in cultural and social programs and attended international events.

In 2011, he founded the Dostum Charity Foundation, which was officially inaugurated in Kabul on 15 September 2011. The foundation describes itself as a non-political and non-partisan organization focused on humanitarian assistance, education, and support for schools, universities, and vocational training centers in Afghanistan. Its activities included support for students and educational initiatives, particularly in northern provinces. As part of these efforts, educational facilities known as the Batur Science Dormitory were established in Takhar and Jowzjan provinces, providing supplementary instruction in subjects such as mathematics and physics and preparation for academic examinations. In 2012, Dostum established Batur TV, a media outlet that broadcast in Uzbek and Turkmen languages. The channel focused on cultural and linguistic programming and later continued its activities primarily through an online news platform.

== Political career ==
Dostum has been active within National Islamic Movement of Afghanistan Party for several years. During the 2010 parliamentary election period, he participated in campaign activities in various provinces in support of party-affiliated candidates. He has stated that he was targeted in several security incidents during this period. In August 2010, while traveling from Kabul to Jowzjan, he and his brother Yar Mohammad Dostum were involved in an armed incident in Baghlan Province. They were not injured. Reports from that period also describe other alleged threats and attempted attacks directed at him.

=== Member of Parliament ===
In the 2018 Afghan parliamentary elections, Dostum ran as a candidate from Jowzjan Province and was elected to the Wolesi Jirga. According to official results, he received more than 20,000 votes. During his parliamentary term, his public positions focused on political representation, security issues, and ethnic and regional concerns in northern Afghanistan.

=== Doha peace talks ===
In September 2020, Dostum was part of the Afghan government's negotiation team in talks with the Taliban held in Doha, Qatar. In these negotiations, he represented National Islamic Movement of Afghanistan Party and expressed views related to ethnic inclusion and participation of minority communities in Afghanistan's political process.

=== Political views ===
In public statements and media interviews, Dostum has been critical of Taliban governance following their return to power. His comments have addressed issues such as land disputes, displacement, security concerns, and restrictions related to cultural and linguistic expression. He has characterized these issues as challenges to political stability and minority rights and has called for international engagement and inclusive political arrangements.

== International activities ==
Dostum has participated in a number of international conferences and meetings related to Afghanistan, both before and after 2021. These appearances have included discussions on peace negotiations, regional cooperation, political representation, human rights, media freedom, women's rights, and education.

=== Selected international meetings ===
- London Conference on Afghanistan, United Kingdom (December 2014)
- TAPI Project Opening Ceremony, Turkmenistan (December 2015)
- United Nations General Assembly, United States (September 2016)
- Brussels Conference on Afghanistan, Belgium (October 2016)
- Tashkent Conference on Afghanistan, Uzbekistan (March 2018)
- Informal Inter-Afghan–Taliban Dialogue, Doha, Qatar (July 2019)
- Parliamentary Union of the Organization of Islamic Cooperation, Ankara, Turkey (2019)
- Afghanistan–Taliban Peace Talks, Doha, Qatar (September 2020)

== After 2021 ==
Following the collapse of the Afghan government and the Taliban’s return to power in August 2021, Dostum has continued his political activities outside Afghanistan. He has held meetings with representatives of the international community and participated in political and socio-cultural gatherings, particularly in Turkey. His activities during this period have focused on issues related to Afghanistan, including the situation of Afghan Turkic communities, political representation, cultural and linguistic rights, women's rights, education, and broader humanitarian and political concerns.
