= Khwaja Du Koh District =

Khwaja Du Koh خواجه دوکوه
- District
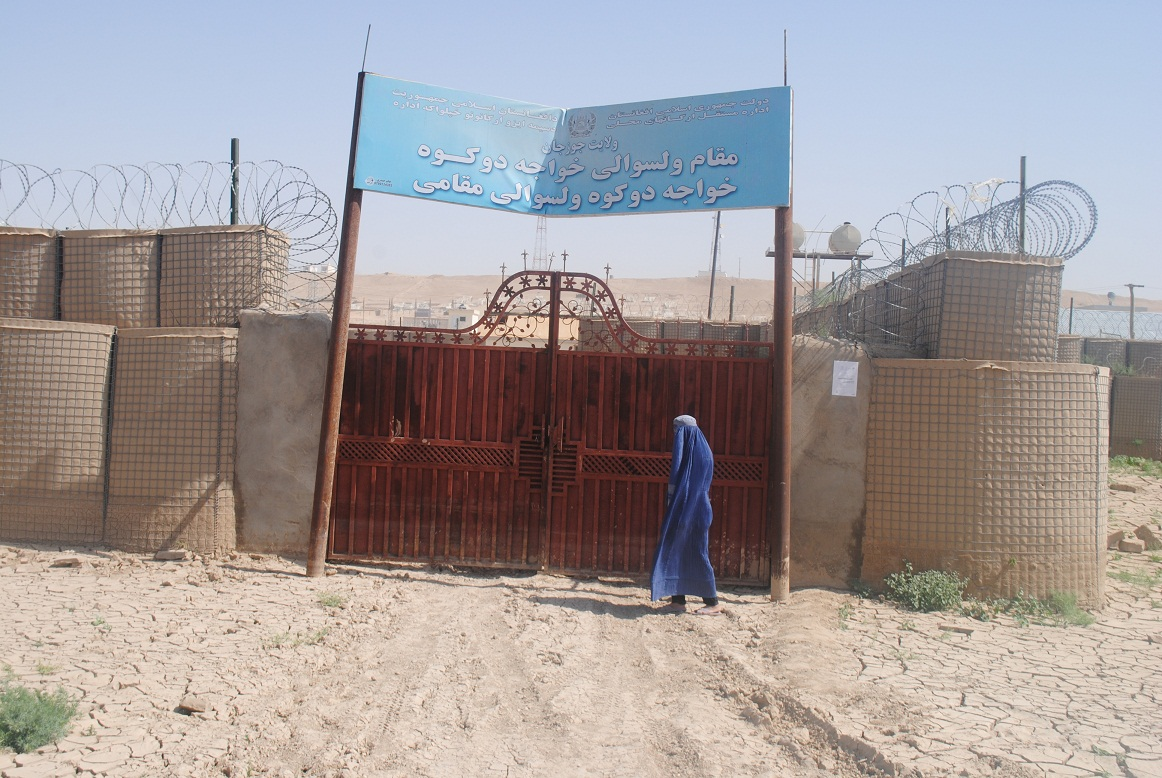
- Head office of Khwaja Du Koh District

- Location in Afghanistan
- Country: Afghanistan
- District: Jowzjan
- Capital: Khwaja Du Koh
- Time zone: UTC+4:30

Khwaja Du Koh (Dari: خواجه دوکوه) is a district of Jowzjan province, Afghanistan, situated in the Karakum Desert. It borders Faryab province to the west, Khamyab District to the north, Mingajik District to the east and Sheberghan District to the south. In 2006, the population was 23,900. The district capital is Khwaja du koh, and is located in the southern part of the district.

== See also ==
- Khwaja du koh
- Jowzjan Province
