= Khwaja Du Koh =

- Location in Afghanistan
- Coordinates: 36°48′57″N 65°37′5″E
- Country: Afghanistan
- Province: Jowzjan Province
- District: Khwaja Du Koh District
- Time zone: UTC+4:30

Khwaja Du Koh is a town and the center of Khwaja Du Koh District, Jowzjan Province, Afghanistan. It is situated few km northwest of the city of Sheberghan and 1.6 km northeast from the main Andkhoy-Sheberghan road. It is located at 36.8158°N 65.6178°E at 306 m altitude at the edge of Karakum Desert.

== Notable people ==
- Abdul Rashid Dostum (1954–), former warlord and politician

== See also ==
- Jowzjan Province
