= Order of the Saur Revolution =

- Type: State order
- Awarded for: Outstanding service to Afghanistan
- Presented by: Afghanistan
- Eligibility: Afghan and foreign citizens
- Status: active
- Ribbon of the order

The Order of the Saur Revolution (Pashto: د ثور انقلاب امر) was a high-ranking military and political state decoration established by the Presidium of the Revolutionary Council of the Democratic Republic of Afghanistan on December 24, 1980. The award ceased to exist by the end of the First Afghan Civil War in April 1992. The early versions of the award were struck at the Moscow Mint. It ranked directly above the Order of the Red Banner and just below the Order of the Sun of Liberty.

== Recipients ==
- Abdul Rashid Dostum
- Mohammad Najibullah
- Yuli Vorontsov
- Babrak Karmal
- Abdul Ahad Momand
- Sergey Akhromeyev

== See also ==
- Hero of the Democratic Republic of Afghanistan
