= Hero of the Democratic Republic of Afghanistan =

Hero of the Republic of Afghanistan
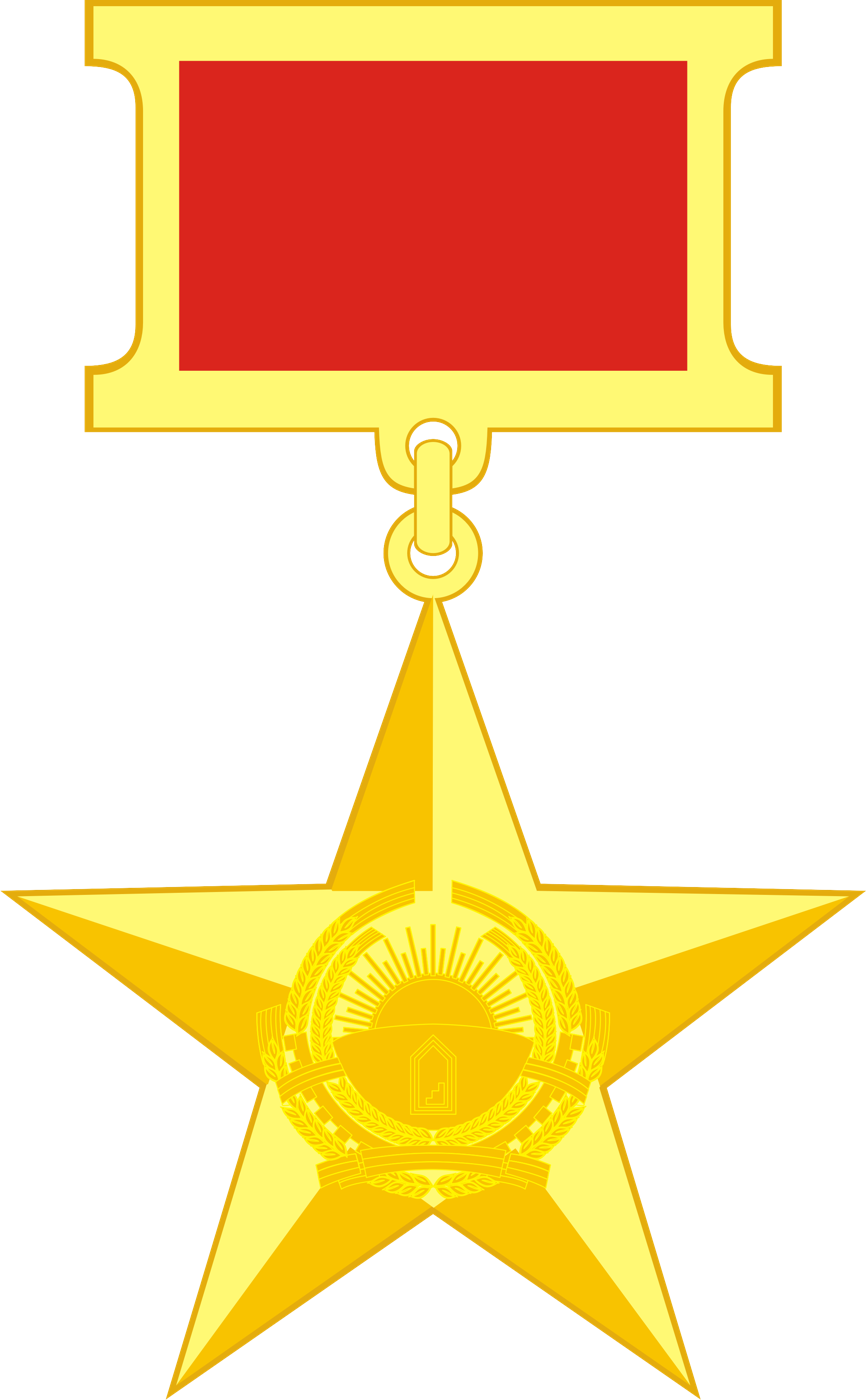
- The 1987–1992 version of the award
- Type: Highest degree of distinction
- Awarded for: Heroic feats in service to the Afghan state and society
- Presented by: Republic of Afghanistan
- Eligibility: Afghan and foreign citizens
- Status: No longer awarded
- Established: August 9, 1986
- Final award: 1988

Highlights
- Total: 16

The title Hero of the Republic of Afghanistan (Pashto: افغانستان جمهوریت اتل) was the highest distinction in the Republic of Afghanistan, awarded to both citizens of the Afghanistan and other states who have performed heroic deeds in the name of defending the gains of the Saur Revolution, freedom, territorial integrity and independence of the Democratic Republic of Afghanistan or who have made an outstanding contribution to strengthening the defense of the Afghan state. It was awarded alongside the Order of the Saur Revolution and the Order of the Sun of Liberty.

== Notable recipients ==
Single award

- Colonel Abdul Ahad Momand – Cosmonaut and Aviator (Awarded in 1988)
- Sher Zamin – Afghan Air Force pilot, the first ever recipient of the award
- Mohammad Amin Sadat – Afghan Air Force pilot
- Lieutenant Colonel Faiz Muhammad – Former commander of the 444th Commando Battalion. Served as Minister of Tribal Affairs in 1980, was assassinated by Jalaluddin Haqqani during a meeting with tribal elders that same year (posthumously awarded in 1986)
- General Mohammad Najibullah – Director of KhAD and President of Afghanistan from 1987 to 1992
- Major General Ahmaduddin (posthumously)
- Lieutenant General Faiz Muhammad
- Lieutenant Said Habib – Sarandoy
- Lieutenant Muhammad Juma – Sarandoy
- Major General Abdul Jalal Razmanda – KhAD
- 37th “Hero” Commando Brigade – after the Second Battle of Zhawar
- Major General Shamsuddin (posthumously)

Two times awarded

- General Rashid Dostum – Afghan Army
- Brigadier General Mohammed Barat – Afghan Air Force

Foreign recipients (all single awards)

- (Soviet Union) Valeri Polyakov – Soviet Cosmonaut (Awarded in 1988)
- (Soviet Union) Vladimir Lyakhov – Soviet Cosmonaut (Awarded in 1988)

== See also ==
- Order of the Red Banner
- Hero of the Soviet Union
- Amir Amanullah Khan Medal
