= Medal for Service in State Security =

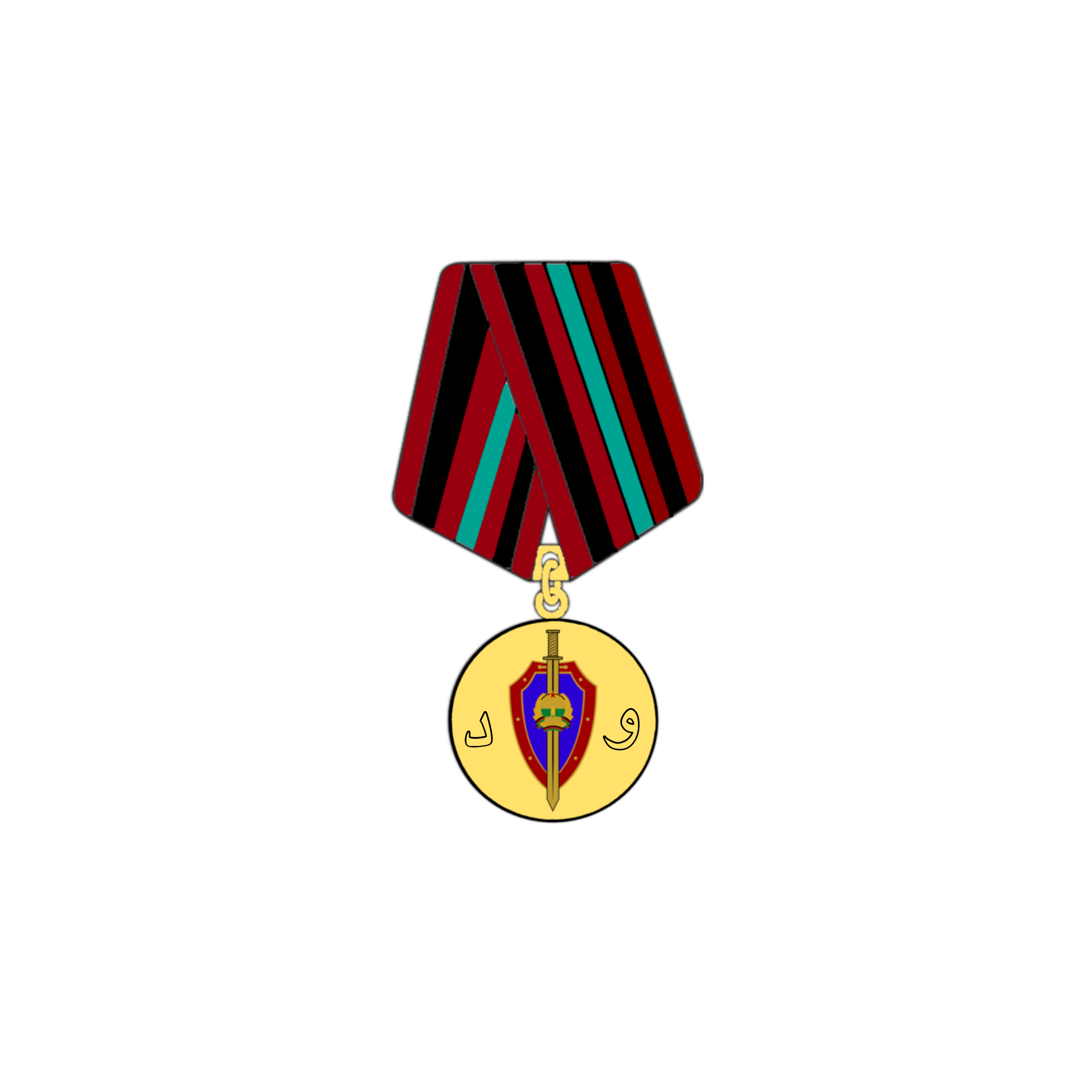
- Presented by: Republic of Afghanistan
- Eligibility: Afghan and foreign citizens
- Status: No longer awarded
- Final award: 1989
- red, green, and black ribbon, worn both for the KHAD and the Army Service Medals

The Medal for Service in State Security, also known as the Afghan KHAD Service Medal, was an award given to members of the Ministry of State Security in Communist Afghanistan. It was often referred to as the “Afghan KGB Medal” due to its connection to the country’s intelligence and security services during that time.

== Notable recipients ==
- Baba Jan Zahid
- Abdul Jalal Razmanda
- Khushal Peroz
- Shahnawaz Tanai
- Abdul Rashid Dostum
