= Balkh Airlines =

Airline in Afghanistan (1996–1997)

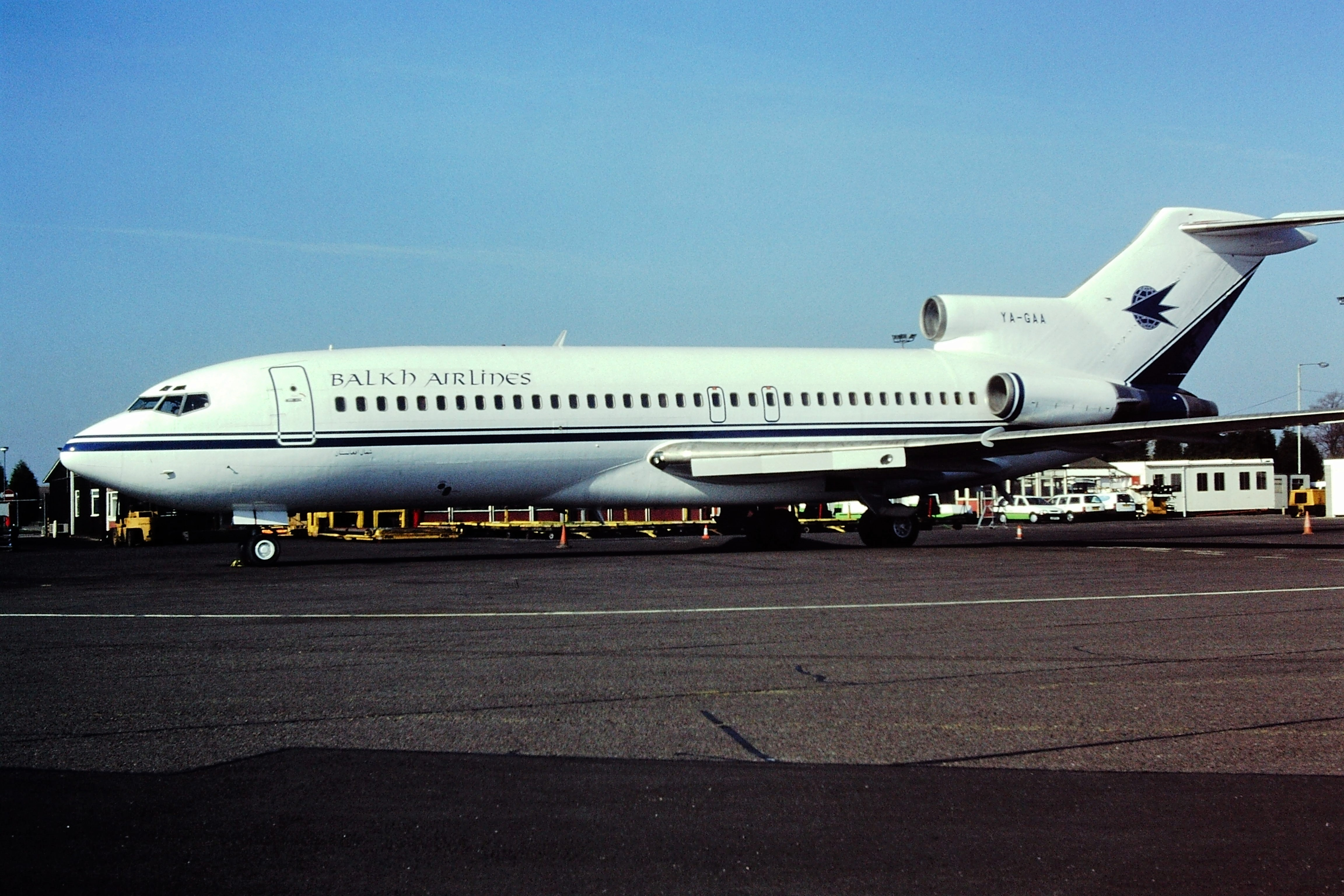
IATA	ICAO	Call sign
-	BHI	SHARIF
- Founded: 1996
- Ceased operations: 1997
- Operating bases: Mazari Sharif Airport
- Fleet size: 1
- Headquarters: Mazari Sharif, Afghanistan

Balkh Airlines was a short-lived airline headquartered in Mazar-i-Sharif, Afghanistan. From 1996 to 1997, it operated passenger flights out of Mazar-e-Sharif Airport using a single Boeing 727-100, competing with Ariana Afghan Airlines. The company had been founded to serve the needs of General Dostum, the Uzbek warlord ruling the north of Afghanistan at that time.
