= Abdul Malik Pahlawan =

Afghan warlord and politician

Abdul Malik Pahlawan عبدالملک پهلوان
- Born: Faryab Province, Afghanistan

Abdul Malik Pahlawan is an Afghan Uzbek warlord and politician based in Faryab Province in northern Afghanistan. He is the head of the Afghanistan Liberation Party and was heavily involved in the factional fighting that consumed Afghanistan throughout the 1990s. His rival for the control of the Uzbek north is fellow warlord Abdul Rashid Dostum, and their militias have clashed several times since the fall of the Taliban.

== Capture of Mazar-i-Sharif ==
Initially, Abdul Malik was one of Abdul Rashid Dostum's subordinates, but in 1996 he blamed Dostum for the murder of his brother, General Rasul Pahlawan. He then entered into secret negotiations with the Taliban, who promised to respect his authority over much of Northern Afghanistan, in exchange for the capture of Ismail Khan, one of their most powerful enemies. Accordingly, on May 25, 1997, he arrested Khan and handed him over and let the Taliban enter Mazar-i-Sharif, giving them control over most of Northern Afghanistan. Because of this, Dostum was forced to flee to Turkey. However Malik quickly decided that the Taliban were not going to keep their promises as they started to disarm his men. He then rejoined forces with the United Islamic Front for the Salvation of Afghanistan (the Northern Alliance), and turned against his erstwhile allies, helping to drive them out of Mazar-i-Sharif.

In September 1997, Dostum returned from exile and defeated Malik, briefly regaining control of Mazar-i-Sharif, and forcing him to escape to Iran in December 1997.

After the fall of the Taliban in 2001, Malik organized his Hezb-e Azadi-ye Afghanistan political party, whose military wing often clashed with members of Dostum's Junbish party.

== See also ==
- 1997 in Afghanistan
- Battles of Mazar-i-Sharif (1997–1998)
