= Abdul Rashid Dostum =

Afghan politician and military officer (born 1954)

Marshal Abdul Rashid Dostum HDR(A) O.R.(B) MSSS
- عبدالرشید دوستم
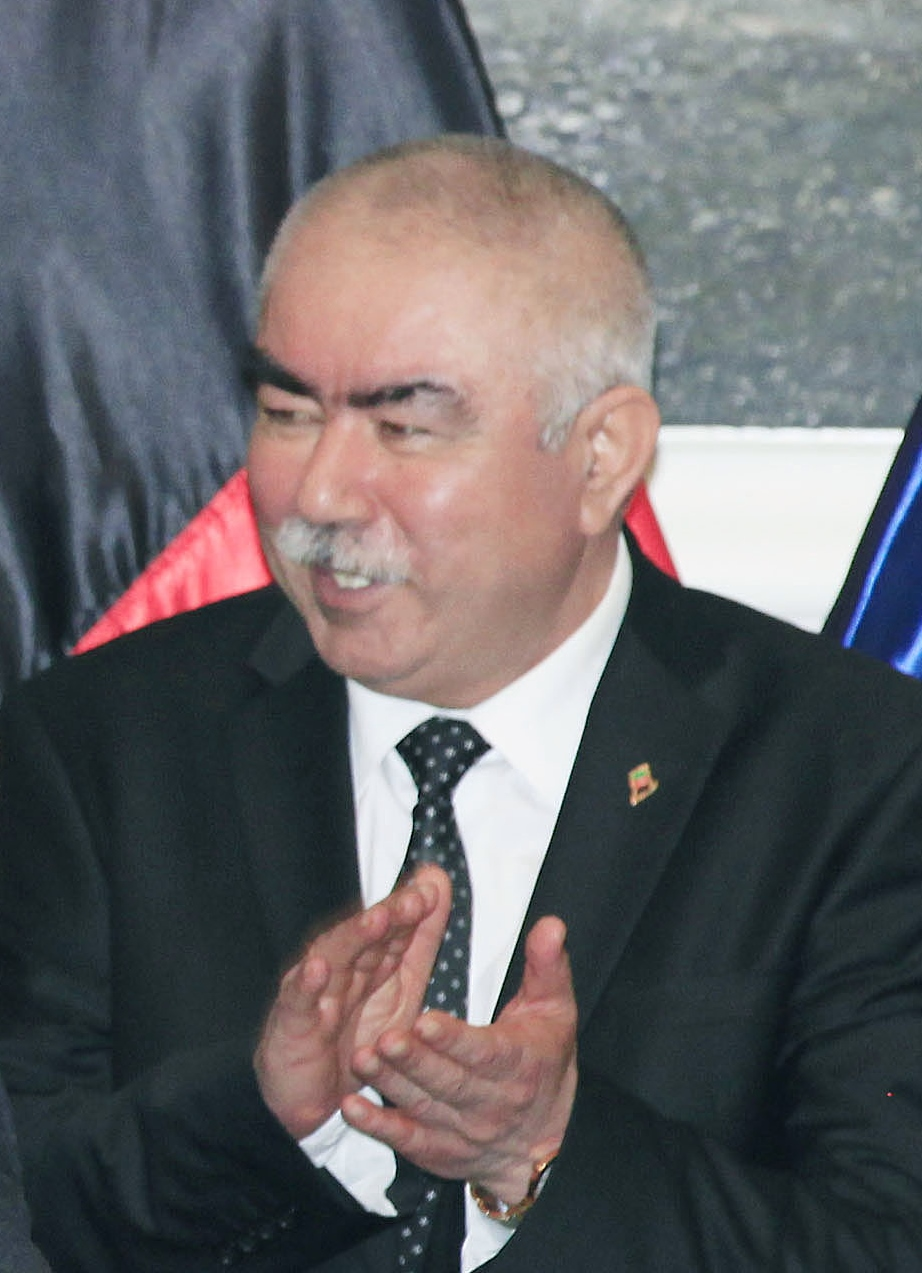
- Dostum in September 2014

First Vice President of Afghanistan
- In office 29 September 2014 – 19 February 2020
- President: Ashraf Ghani
- Preceded by: Yunus Qanuni
- Succeeded by: Amrullah Saleh

Personal details
- Born: 1954 (age 71–72) Khwaja Du Koh, Jowzjan, Kingdom of Afghanistan
- Party: PDPA (until 1992); Junbish-e Milli (from 1992)
- Children: Batur Dostum
- Awards: Hero of the Democratic Republic of Afghanistan; Order of the Red Banner; Afghan KGB Medal; Order of the Saur Revolution
- Nationality: Afghan
- Nickname: Pasha (پاشا)

Military service
- Allegiance: Democratic Republic of Afghanistan (1978–1992); Junbish-e Milli (1992–1996); Northern Alliance (1996–2001); Islamic Republic of Afghanistan (2001–2021)
- Branch/service: Afghan Army
- Years of service: 1976–2021
- Rank: Field Marshal
- Unit: 2nd Infantry Division; 444th Commando Battalion; 6th Corps
- Commands: Afghan Army; Afghan Commando Forces (formerly)
- Battles/wars: Saur Revolution; Soviet–Afghan War; Siege of Khost; Second Battle of Zhawar; Battle of Arghandab; First Afghan Civil War; Battle of Jalalabad; Second Afghan Civil War; Battle of Kabul; Afshar Operation; Third Afghan Civil War; Battles of Mazar-i-Sharif; War in Afghanistan (2001–2021); US invasion of Afghanistan; Fall of Mazar-i-Sharif; Siege of Kunduz; Battle of Qala-i-Jangi; Dasht-i-Leili massacre; Operation Enduring Freedom; Taliban insurgency; Battle of Darzab; 2021 Taliban offensive

Abdul Rashid Dostum (Note: Dari and Uzbek: عبدالرشید دوستم, /ˈɑːbdəl rəˈʃiːd doʊˈstuːm/ AHB-dəl rə-SHEED doh-STOOM) (born 1954) is an Afghan exiled politician, former military officer and warlord. He is the founder and leader of the Junbish-e Milli political party, and was a senior army officer in the military of the former Afghan socialist government during the Soviet–Afghan War, initially part of the Afghan Commando Forces. In 2001, Dostum became a key indigenous ally to the U.S. Special Forces and the CIA during the campaign to topple the Taliban government. He is one of the most powerful warlords since the beginning of the Afghan conflict, infamous for being an opportunist and siding with winners during Afghanistan's several civil wars. Dostum was also referred to as a kingmaker due to his significant role in Afghan politics.

An ethnic Uzbek from a peasant family in Jawzjan province, Dostum joined the People's Democratic Party of Afghanistan (PDPA) as a teenager before enlisting in the Afghan Army and training as a paratrooper, serving in his native region around Sheberghan. Following the outbreak of the Soviet–Afghan War, Dostum commanded a KHAD paramilitary unit and eventually gained a reputation for defeating mujahideen commanders in northern Afghanistan and even persuading some to defect to the communist cause. As a result, the communist government gained effective control over the country's north. He achieved several promotions in the army and was honored as a "Hero of Afghanistan" by President Mohammed Najibullah in 1988. By this time he was commanding up to 45,000 troops in the region under his responsibility.

== Service ==
Following the dissolution of the Soviet Union, Dostum played a central role in the collapse of Najibullah's government by "defecting" to the mujahideen; the division-sized loyal forces he commanded in the north became an independent paramilitary of his newly founded party called Junbish-e Milli. He allied with Ahmad Shah Massoud and together they captured Kabul, before another civil war loomed. Initially supporting the new government of Burhanuddin Rabbani, he switched sides in 1994 by allying with Gulbuddin Hekmatyar, but he backed Rabbani again by 1996. During this time he remained in control of the country's north which functioned as a relatively stable proto-state, but remained a loose partner of Massoud in the Northern Alliance. A year later, Mazar-i-Sharif was overrun by his former aide Abdul Malik Pahlawan, resulting in a battle in which he regained control. In 1998, the city was overrun by the Taliban and Dostum fled the country until returning to Afghanistan in 2001, joining the Northern Alliance forces after the US invasion and leading his loyal faction in the Fall of Mazar-i-Sharif.

After the fall of the Taliban-led government, he joined interim president Hamid Karzai's administration as Deputy Defense Minister and later served as chairman Joint Chiefs of Staff of the Afghan Army, a role often viewed as ceremonial. His militia feuded with forces loyal to general Atta Muhammad Nur. Dostum was a candidate in the 2004 elections, and was an ally of victorious Karzai in the 2009 elections. From 2011, he was part of the leadership council of the National Front of Afghanistan along with Ahmad Zia Massoud and Mohammad Mohaqiq. He served as Vice President of Afghanistan in Ashraf Ghani's administration from 2014 to 2020. In 2020, he was promoted to the rank of marshal after a political agreement between Ghani and former Chief Executive Abdullah Abdullah. On 11 August 2021 during the Taliban's nationwide offensive, Dostum fled across Hairatan to Uzbekistan. In 2021 he pledged allegiance to the National Resistance Front of Afghanistan, and formed the Supreme Council of National Resistance of the Islamic Republic of Afghanistan in opposition to the new Taliban government. Dostum now resides in exile in Turkey, and on 15 September 2024 urged groups opposed to Taliban rule to form a government-in-exile.

Dostum is a controversial figure in Afghanistan. He is seen as a capable and fierce military leader and remains wildly popular among the Uzbek community in the country. Many of his supporters call him "Pasha" (پاشا), an honorable Uzbek/Turkic term. However, he has also been widely accused of committing atrocities and war crimes, most notoriously the suffocation of up to 1,000 Taliban fighters in the Dasht-i-Leili massacre, and he was widely feared among the populace. In 2018, the International Criminal Court (ICC) was reported to be considering launching an inquiry into whether Dostum had engaged in war crimes in Afghanistan.

== Early life ==
Dostum was born in 1954 in Khwaja Du Koh near Sheberghan in Jowzjan province, Afghanistan. Coming from an impoverished ethnic Uzbek family, he received a very basic traditional education as he was forced to drop out of school at a young age. From there, he took up work in the village's major gas fields.

== Career ==
Dostum began working in 1970 in a state-owned gas refinery in Sheberghan. He began participating in union politics when the republican government led by Daoud Khan started to arm the staff of the workers in the oil and gas refineries. The reason for this was to create "groups for the Defense of the Revolution". As a result of the new communist ideas entering Afghanistan in the 1970s, Dostum enlisted in the Afghan Army in 1976. He received his basic military training in Jalalabad and his squadron was deployed in the rural areas around Sheberghan, under the auspices of the Ministry of National Security. According to photographic evidence, Dostum additionally received airborne training and still chooses to wear two first-class "Master Paratrooper" Afghan jump wings.

As a Parcham faction member of the People's Democratic Party of Afghanistan (PDPA), he was exiled after the purge of Parcham by the party's Khalqist faction leaders, living in Peshawar, Pakistan for a while. After the Soviet invasion (Operation Storm-333) and installation of Babrak Karmal as head of state, Dostum returned to Afghanistan, where he started commanding a local pro-government militia in his native Jawzjan Province.

=== Soviet–Afghan War ===
By the mid-1980s, he commanded a force of around 20,000 paramilitaries and controlled the northern provinces of Afghanistan. While the unit recruited throughout Jowzjan and had a relatively broad base, many of its early troops and commanders came from Dostum's home village. He left the army after the purge of Parchamites, but returned after the Soviet occupation began.

During the Soviet–Afghan War, Dostum was commanding a paramilitary battalion to fight and route mujahideen forces; he had been appointed an officer due to prior military experience. This eventually became a regiment and later became incorporated into the defense forces as the 53rd Infantry Division. Dostum and his new division reported directly to President Mohammad Najibullah. Later on, he became the commander of the military unit 374 in Jowzjan. He defended the Soviet-backed Afghan government against the mujahideen forces throughout the 1980s. While he was only a regional commander, he had largely raised his forces by himself. The Jowzjani militia Dostum controlled was one of the few in the country that was able to be deployed outside its own region. They were deployed in Kandahar in 1988 when Soviet forces were withdrawing from Afghanistan.

Due to his efforts in the army, Dostum was awarded the title "Hero of the Republic of Afghanistan" by President Najibullah.

=== Civil war and northern Afghanistan autonomous state ===
Dostum's men would become an important force in the fall of Kabul in 1992, with Dostum deciding to defect from Najibullah and allying himself with opposition commanders Ahmad Shah Massoud and Sayed Jafar Naderi, the head of the Isma'ili community, and together they captured the capital city. With the help of fellow defectors Mohammad Nabi Azimi and Abdul Wakil, his forces entered Kabul by air in the afternoon of 14 April. He and Massoud fought in a coalition against Gulbuddin Hekmatyar. Massoud and Dostum's forces joined to defend Kabul against Hekmatyar. Some 4,000–5,000 of his troops, units of his Sheberghan-based 53rd Division and Balkh-based Guards Division, garrisoning Bala Hissar fort, Maranjan Hill and Khwaja Rawash Airport, where they stopped Najibullah from entering to flee.

Dostum then left Kabul for his northern stronghold Mazar-i-Sharif, where he ruled, in effect, an independent region (or 'proto-state'), often referred as the Northern Autonomous Zone. He printed his own Afghan currency, ran a small airline named Balkh Air, and formed relations with countries like Uzbekistan effectively creating his own proto-state with an army of up to 40,000 men, and with tanks supplied by Uzbekistan and Russia. While the rest of the country was in chaos, his region remained prosperous and functional, and it won him the support from people of all ethnic groups. Many people fled to his territory to escape the violence and fundamentalism imposed by the Taliban later on. In 1994, Dostum allied himself with Gulbuddin Hekmatyar against the government of Burhanuddin Rabbani and Ahmad Shah Massoud, but in 1995 sided with the government again.

=== Taliban era ===
Following the rise of the Taliban and their capture of Kabul, Dostum aligned himself with the Northern Alliance (United Front) against the Taliban. The Northern Alliance was assembled in late 1996 by Dostum, Massoud and Karim Khalili against the Taliban. At this point, he is said to have had a force of some 50,000 men supported by both aircraft and tanks.

Much like other Northern Alliance leaders, Dostum also faced infighting within his group and was later forced to surrender his power to General Abdul Malik Pahlawan. Malik entered into secret negotiations with the Taliban, who promised to respect his authority over much of northern Afghanistan, in exchange for the apprehension of Ismail Khan, one of their enemies. Accordingly, on 25 May 1997, Malik arrested Khan, handed him over and let the Taliban enter Mazar-e-Sharif, giving them control over most of northern Afghanistan. Because of this, Dostum was forced to flee to Turkey. However, Malik soon realized that the Taliban were not sincere with their promises as he saw his men being disarmed. He then rejoined the Northern Alliance and turned against his erstwhile allies, driving them from Mazar-e-Sharif. In October 1997, Dostum returned from exile and retook charge. After Dostum briefly regained control of Mazar-e-Sharif, the Taliban returned in 1998, and he again fled to Turkey.

=== Operation Enduring Freedom ===
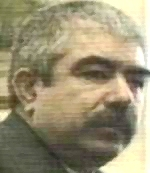
Dostum in early 2002

Dostum returned to Afghanistan in May 2001 to open up a new front before the U.S.-led campaign against the Taliban joined him, along with Commander Massoud, Ismail Khan and Mohammad Mohaqiq. On 17 October 2001, the CIA's eight-man Team Alpha, including Johnny Micheal Spann landed in the Dar-e-Suf to link up with Dostum. Three days later, the 12 members of Operational Detachment Alpha (ODA) 595 landed to join forces with Dostum and Team Alpha. Dostum, the Tajik commander Atta Muhammad Nur and their American allies defeated Taliban forces and recaptured Mazar-i-Sharif on 10 November 2001.

On 24 November 2001, 15,000 Taliban soldiers were due to surrender after the Siege of Kunduz to American and Northern Alliance forces. Instead, 400 Al-Qaeda prisoners arrived just outside Mazar-i-Sharif. After they surrendered to Dostum, they were transferred to the 19th century garrison fortress, Qala-i-Jangi. The next day, while being questioned by CIA officers Spann and David Tyson, they used concealed weapons to revolt, triggering what became the Battle of Qala-i-Jangi against the guards. The uprising was finally brought under control after six days.

=== Dasht-i-Leili massacre ===
Dostum has been accused by Western journalists of responsibility for the suffocating or otherwise killing of Taliban prisoners in December 2001, with the number of victims estimated as 2,000. In 2009, Dostum denied the accusations and US President Obama ordered an investigation into the massacre, which as of August 2025, never took place.

=== Karzai administration ===
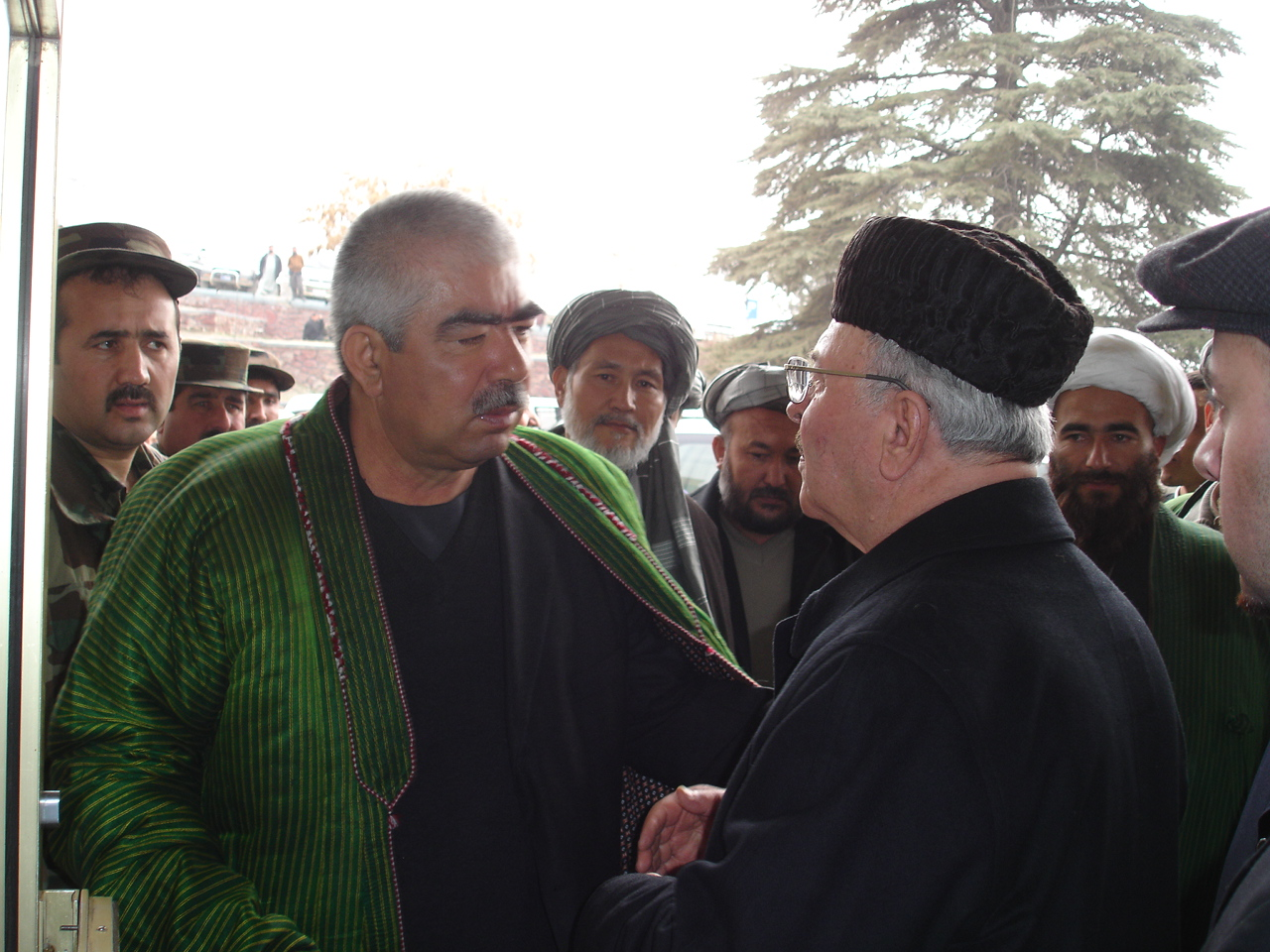
Dostum (left) in 2005

In the aftermath of Taliban's removal from northern Afghanistan, forces loyal to Dostum frequently clashed with Tajik forces loyal to Atta Muhammad Nur. Atta's men kidnapped and killed a number of Dostum's men, and constantly agitated to gain control of Mazar-e-Sharif. Through the political mediations of the Karzai administration, the International Security Assistance Force (ISA) and the United Nations, the Dostum-Atta feud gradually declined, leading to their alignment in a new political party.

Dostum served as deputy defense minister the early period of the Karzai administration. On 20 May 2003, Dostum narrowly escaped an assassination attempt. He was often residing outside Afghanistan, mainly in Turkey. In February 2008, he was suspended after the apparent kidnapping and torture of a political rival.

=== Time in Turkey ===
Some media reports in 2008 stated earlier that Dostum was "seeking political asylum" in Turkey while others said he was exiled. One Turkish media outlet said Dostum was visiting after flying there with then Turkey's Foreign Minister Ali Babacan during a meeting of the Organization for Security and Cooperation in Europe (OSCE).

On 16 August 2009, Dostum was asked to return from exile to Afghanistan to support President Hamid Karzai in his bid for re-election. He later flew by helicopter to his northern stronghold of Sheberghan, where he was greeted by thousands of his supporters in the local stadium. He subsequently made overtures to the United States, promising he could "destroy the Taliban and al Qaeda" if supported by the U.S., saying that "the U.S. needs strong friends like Dostum."

=== Ghani administration ===
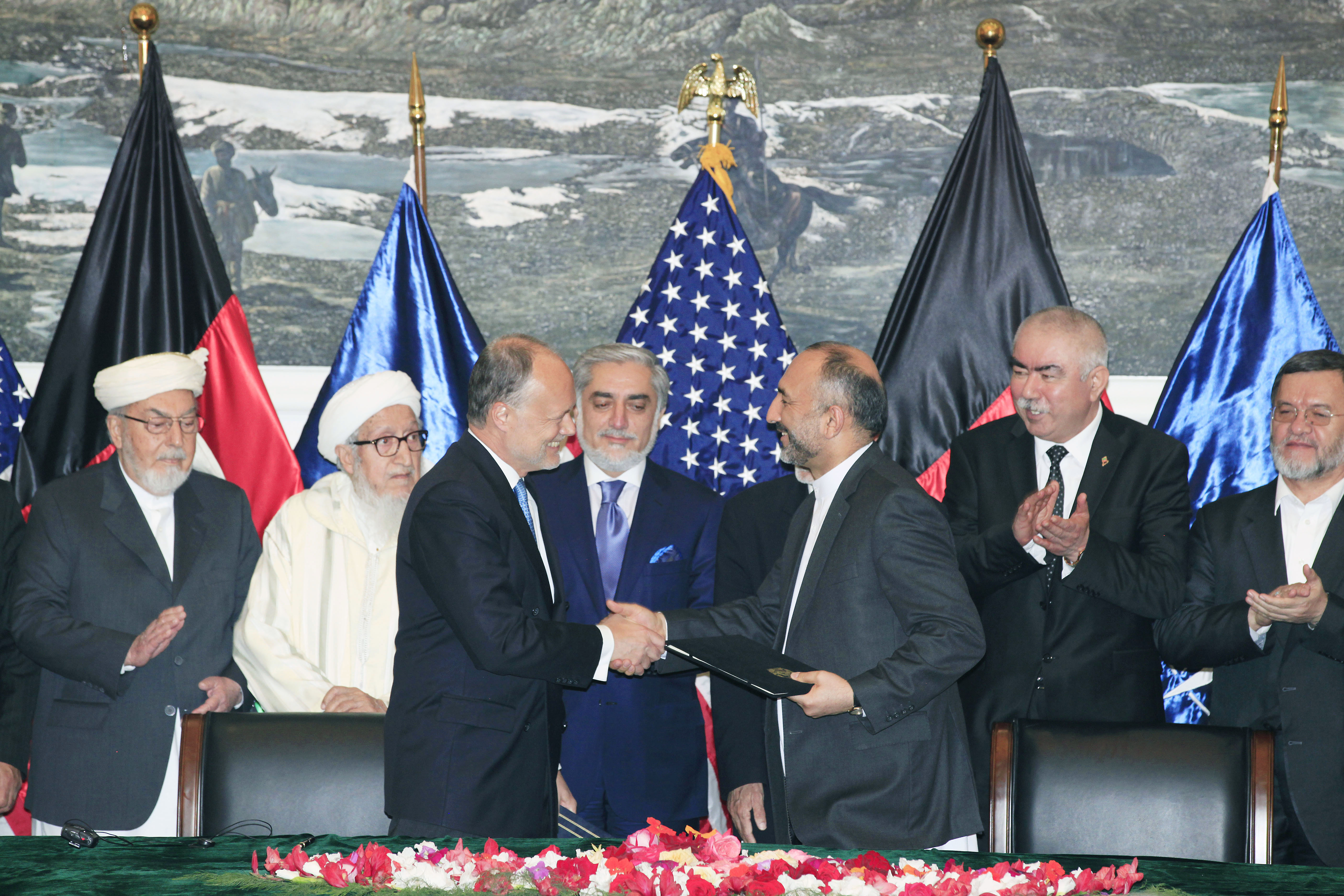
Dostum (second from right) at the signing of the Bilateral Security Agreement on 30 September 2014

On 7 October 2013, the day after filing his nomination for the 2014 general elections as running mate of Ashraf Ghani, Dostum issued a press statement that some news media were willing to welcome as "apologies": "Many mistakes were made during the civil war (...) It is time we apologize to the Afghan people who were sacrificed due to our negative policies (...) I apologize to the people who suffered from the violence and civil war (...)".

Dostum was directly chosen as First Vice President of Afghanistan in the April–June 2014 Afghan presidential election, next to Ashraf Ghani as president and Sarwar Danish as second vice president.

In July 2016, Human Rights Watch accused Abdul Rashid Dostum's National Islamic Movement of Afghanistan of killing, abusing and looting civilians in the northern Faryab Province during June. Militia forces loyal to Dostum stated that the civilians they targeted – at least 13 killed and 32 wounded – were supporters of the Taliban.

In November 2016, at a buzkashi match, he punched his political rival Ahmad Ischi, and then his bodyguards beat Ischi. In 2017, he was accused of having Ischi kidnapped in that incident and raped with a gun on camera during a five-day detention, claims that Dostum denies but that nevertheless forced him into exile in Turkey.

On 26 July 2018, he narrowly escaped a suicide bombing by ISIL-KP as he returned to Afghanistan at Kabul airport. Just after Dostum's convoy departed the airport, an attacker armed with a suicide vest bombed a crowd of several hundred people celebrating his return at the entrance to the airport. The attack killed 14 and injured 50, including civilians and armed security.

On 30 March 2019, Dostum again escaped an expected assassination attempt while traveling from Mazar-e-Sharif to Jawzjan Province, though two of his bodyguards were killed. The Taliban claimed responsibility for the attack, the second in eight months.

On 11 August 2021 during the Taliban's nationwide offensive, Dostum, along with Atta Muhammad Nur, led the government's defence of the city of Mazar-i-Sharif. Three days later, they fled across Hairatan to Uzbekistan. Atta Nur claimed that they were forced to flee due to a "conspiracy". Both men later pled allegiance to the National Resistance Front of Afghanistan, the remaining remnants of the collapsed Islamic Republic of Afghanistan. Dostum, Atta, Yunus Qanuni, Abdul Rasul Sayyaf and some other political figures formed the Supreme Council of National Resistance of the Islamic Republic of Afghanistan in opposition to the new Taliban government in October 2021. Dostum now resides in exile in Turkey, and on 15 September 2024 urged groups opposed to Taliban rule to form a government-in-exile.

== Political and social views ==
Dostum is considered to be liberal and somewhat leftist. Being ethnic Uzbek, he has worked on the battlefield with leaders from all other major ethnic groups, Hazaras, Tajiks and Pashtuns. When Dostum was ruling his northern Afghanistan proto-state before the Taliban took over in 1998, women were able to go about unveiled, girls were allowed to go to school and study at the University of Balkh, cinemas showed Indian films, music played on television, and Russian vodka and German beer were openly available: activities which were all banned by the Taliban.

We will not submit to a government where there is no whisky and no music.

— Dostum to his aides during the rise of the Taliban in c. 1995

He viewed the ISAF forces attempt to crush the Taliban as ineffective and has gone on record saying in 2007 that he could mop up the Taliban "in six months" if allowed to raise a 10,000 strong army of Afghan veterans. As of 2007, senior Afghan government officials did not trust Dostum as they were concerned that he might be secretly rearming his forces.

== Personal life ==
Dostum is more than 183 centimetres (6.00 ft) tall and has been described as "beefy". He generally prefers to wear a Soviet-style camouflage military uniform, previously having worn KLMK, having a trademark bushy moustache.

Dostum was married to a woman named Khadija. According to Brian Glyn Williams, Khadija had an accidental death in the 1990s which broke Dostum as he "really loved his wife". Dostum eventually remarried after Khadija's death.

He named one of his sons Mustafa Kamal, after the founder of the modern Turkish Republic, Mustafa Kemal Atatürk. Dostum has spent a considerable amount of time in Turkey, and some of his family reside there.

Dostum is known to drink alcohol, a rarity in Afghanistan, and apparently a fan of Russian vodka. He reportedly suffered from diabetes. In 2014 when he became vice president, Dostum reportedly gave up drinking for healthy meals and morning jogs.

== In popular culture ==
- Navid Negahban portrays Dostum in the 2018 film 12 Strong.
- Dostum appears as a playing card in the board game A Distant Plain, part of a series of wargames simulating historic insurgency and counterinsurgency conflicts.

== See also ==
- Abdul Jabar Qahraman
- Afghan Civil War (1989–1992)
- Afghan Civil War (1992–1996)

== Bibliography ==
- Harnden, Toby (2021). First Casualty: The Untold Story of the CIA Mission to Avenge 9/11. Little, Brown and Company. ISBN 9780316540964.
- Vogelsang, Willem (2001). The Afghans. Oxford: Blackwell. ISBN 0-631-19841-5.

Political offices
Preceded by Yunus Qanuni	First Vice President of Afghanistan; 29 September 2014–19 February 2020	Succeeded by Amrullah Saleh
