= Uzbeks in Afghanistan =

Uzbeks are one of major ethnic groups in Afghanistan, being country's third or fourth largest ethnicity, after Pashtuns, Tajiks and Hazaras. They are mainly based in northern Afghanistan, in the provinces bordering Uzbekistan and Turkmenistan; this region is also known as Afghan Turkestan.

Ethnic groups in Afghanistan as of 1997; Uzbeks being shaded light blue in northwest

== History ==
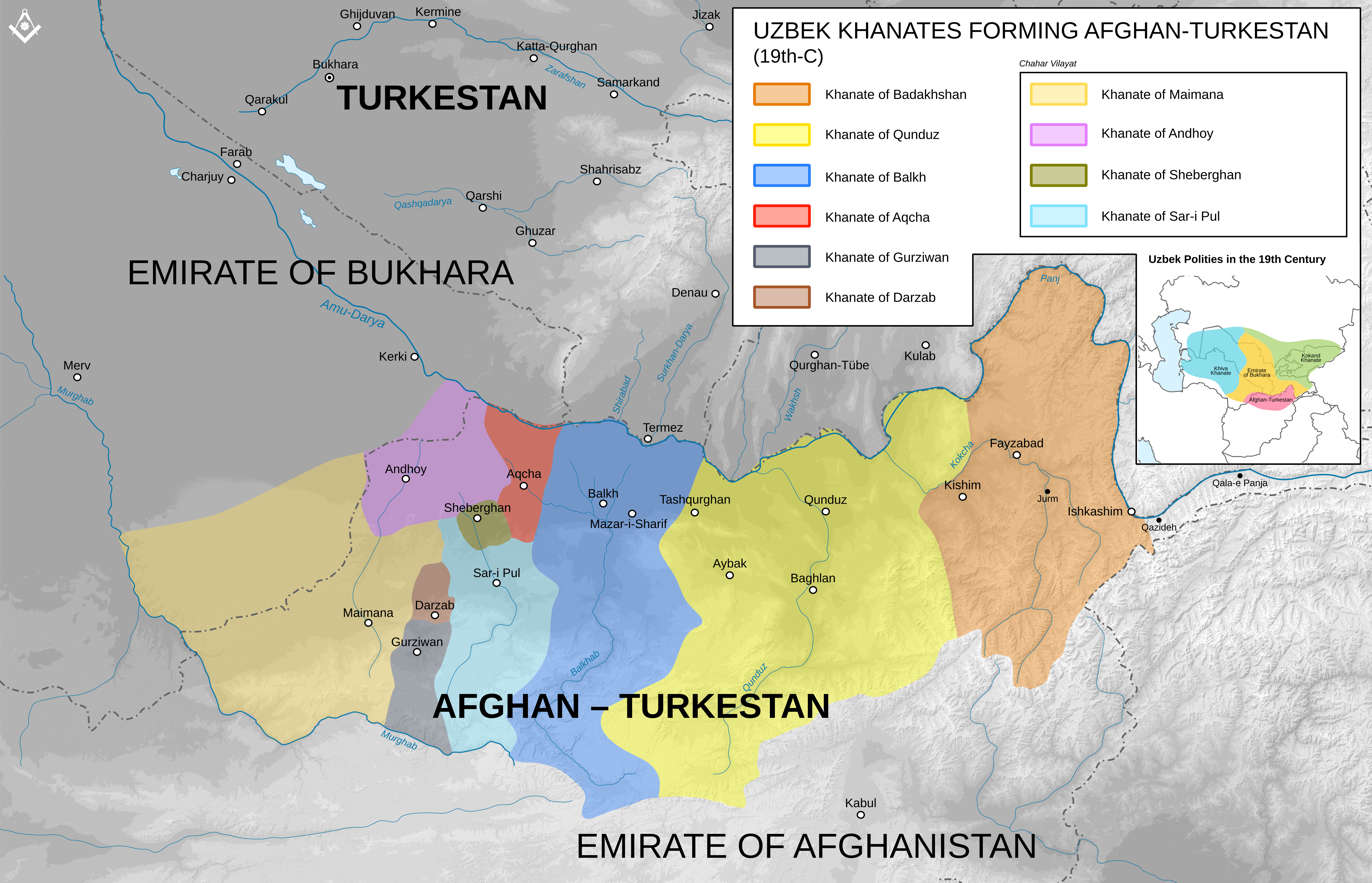
Map of Uzbek khanates in Afghan Turkestan in the 19th century

Historically, present-day northern Afghanistan was divided among autonomous Uzbek khanates, nominally under Khanate of Bukhara. Most important of them were Kunduz Khanate and the Chahar Wilayat of Maymana, Sar-i Pul, Sheberghan, and Andkhui. In the mid 19th-century these khanates were systematically conquered by Afghans in several campaigns.

== Demographics and society ==
Uzbeks in Afghanistan speak southern Uzbek and most are Sunni Muslims. Anthropologists distinguish between the Watani (also called Asli), descendants of 16th-century semi-independent Uzbek chiefdoms, and the Mohajirin (also called Narg-e Bet or Yengi Geldi), who are descendants of migrants who arrived in the late 19th and early 20th centuries after the Russian conquest of Central Asia or as refugees from the Basmachi movement and Sovietization. The Watani are often tribal or regionally oriented, while the Mohajirin are urbanite with stronger connections to Central Asia. These internal divisions have historically prevented the emergence of a unified Uzbek identity in Afghanistan. As of a 2022 estimate, Uzbeks have a share of 6 to 15% population of Afghanistan. Uzbeks have a majority or plurality in the provinces of Faryab, Jowzjan, and Sar-e-Pol, with significant population in Balkh, Kunduz, Takhar, and Badakhshan.

== See also ==
- Uzbeks in Pakistan
- Uzbeks in Russia
- Uzbeks in China
- Uzbeks in Turkey
- Turkmens in Afghanistan
