= National Islamic Movement of Afghanistan =

Primarily Uzbek political party in Afghanistan

National Islamic Movement of Afghanistan جنبش ملی اسلامی افغانستان
- Leader: Abdul Rashid Dostum
- President: Batur Dostum
- Chairperson: Shujauddin Zargham
- Spokesperson: Rahila Dostum
- Founder: Abdul Rashid Dostum
- Founded: 1992; 34 years ago
- Split from: Settam-e-Melli; Parcham
- Newspaper: Junbish-e Milli
- Youth wing: Salahuddin Hissam
- Ideology: Minority rights; Uzbek and Turkmen interests; Secularism; Factions: Afghan nationalism
- Political position: Centre-left to center-right
- International affiliation: UNPO; Organization of Turkic States; Alliance of Democrats

Party flag

The National Islamic Movement of Afghanistan (Dari: جنبش ملی اسلامی افغانستان, Junbish-i-Milli Islami Afghanistan), sometimes called simply Junbish, is a political party in Afghanistan founded by Abdul Rashid Dostum in 1992 made from his loyalist remnants from the People's Democratic Party of Afghanistan's communist government.

It is described as "an organisation heavily peopled with former Communists and Islamists," and is regarded as somewhat secular and left-leaning. Its voter base is mostly Uzbeks, and it is strongest in Jowzjan, Balkh, Faryab, Sar-e Pol, and Samangan provinces. It was mainly supported by Uzbekistan during the Afghan Civil War of 1992–1996 and the Afghan Civil War of 1996–2001.

== History ==
=== Formation ===
Junbish and its military wing, Division 53 started as a "self-defense unit" for the Sheberghan oil fields in northern Afghanistan, growing to a platoon and then a company until it grew to a division of about 40,000 men by 1989. This division joined the Afghan government and was referred to as Division 53. In 1988 Junbish forces replaced departing Soviet Union forces and took control of Kandahar as well as deploying to Khost, Logar, Ghazni, Gardez in Paktika and around Kabul.

Thee units were joined by many defecting mujaheddin commanders, such as Rasul Pahlawan, Dr. Hissamuddin Hissam, Ghaffar Pahlawan, who were Uzbeks from Saripul and Takhar. General Majid Rozi, an Afghan Arab Uzbek from Balkh, and General Jura Beg, an officer from Jowzjan, also joined. Most of the joining members were either defectors or from the Parcham wing of the People's Democratic Party of Afghanistan (PDPA).

=== Massoud and capture of Mazar-e Sharif (1992) ===
In 1992, the new President of Russia, Boris Yeltsin withdrew aid to the government of Dr Mohammad Najibullah, Dostum started to enter into negotiations with Ahmad Shah Massoud. When, on March 19, Najibullah attempted to replace the Tajik General Momim, with a General Rasul, a Khalqist Pashtun who commanded the Hairatan garrison, Mumin revolted with Dostum's support. Dostum, through this, took over control of Mazar-e Sharif. This resulted in widespread looting. At this point Junbish was the dominant party in Baghlan, Samangan, Balkh, Jauzjan, Sar-I Pul and Faryab.

=== Battle of Kabul (1992–1994) ===
Roundel of Dostum's air force during the Civil War.

Roundel Air Force (reverse).

When the government of Najibullah collapsed in April 1992, Junbish forces entered the city through the road near the airport and within a month held Tapa Maranjan, Bala Hisar, Kabul Airport, Old Microroian and Chaman Hozori, putting artillery in the first two of those positions. Furthermore, by controlling the airport they prevented the escape of Najibullah and forced him to take refuge in the United Nations compounds. Furthermore, through defectors from the previous government and his control of the airport, Dostum was able to control jet fighters for a significant portion of the Battle of Kabul.

In May 1992 the command structure had General Majid Rozi as the overall military commander, General Hamayoon Fauzi in charge of political affairs, General Jura Beg in charge of troop deployments and rotations and General Aminullah Karim in charge of logistics. Rozi was recalled to Mazar towards the end of 1992 leaving Fauzi in charge. Other major leaders included Abdul Chiri who controlled a militia regiment, the 54th regiment. Control was mostly maintained from the Naqlia base which was on the road from Kart-I Nau and Shah Shahid.

In July 1992, Dostum sent a petition to Ahmad Shah Massoud in order to establish a general headquarters to manage and control forces in the area. Despite Massoud rejecting this Dostum created it, creating tensions as a result.

=== Alliance with Hezb-e Islami Gulbuddin and defeat in Kabul (1994) ===
After increased tensions with Jamiat-e Islami, Junbish attempted to ally themselves with Hezb-e Islami Gulbuddin in January 1994. However, this betrayal resulted in Junbish being forced from most of their strongholds in Kabul. Between January and June 1994 some of the fiercest fighting of the war took place, with up to 25,000 people being killed.

=== Capture of Mazar-e Sharif and expansion in the North ===
The loss in Kabul was countered by the removal of Jamiat forces in Northern Afghanistan. After heavy fighting in Mazar, Jamiat was pushed out although large amounts of reports regarding rape and extrajudicial execution exist regarding this battle. After the capture of Mazar, Dostum concentrated his efforts on strengthening his position in the north.

=== Defection of General Abdul Malik Pahlawan (1997) ===
In 1996 Rasul Pahlawan was assassinated in June by his bodyguard, allegedly at Dostum's orders. In 1997, a group of Junbish-i-Milli associated with Rasul's brother defected under the leadership of General Abdul Malik Pahlawan. Malik joined the Taliban and forced Dostum out of the country for 4 months, where he fled to Turkey. However Malik quickly betrayed the Taliban, massacring thousands of Taliban prisoners before being ousted in Taliban bombardment in September 1997. During this time, large amounts of rape and looting were reported, although it is not clear as to what extent this was done by Junbish.

Following this Dostum returned to Afghanistan and ousted Malik during a conflict in Faryab. Most of Malik's forces then defected and rejoined Junbish under Dostum. Forces of Dostum were said to have looted many Pashtoons in Faryab province following this. Dostum was even further weakened however as the road from Herat to Maimana was taken by the Taliban in July 1998, and then Mazar-e Sharif in August.

=== Fall of the Taliban (2001) ===
Dostum and Junbish were particularly instrumental in the fall of the Taliban in 2001 under the Northern Alliance.

=== Dissolution following the return of the Taliban (2021) ===
The group/party officially came to an end after the Taliban's second takeover of Afghanistan.

== Human rights abuses ==
Junbish was particularly involved in human rights abuses, particularly in Northern Afghanistan from 1992–2001 and the area around Kabul during the Battle of Kabul. Their predisposition to looting areas under control earned them the nickname Gilam Jam which means the "carpet is gathered up." Areas under Junbish control, such as Naqlia base, were frequently cited as suffering serious human rights abuses, including rape, murder and looting. Areas such as Shah Shahid and Kārte Naw faced similar problems. In July 2016 Human Rights Watch accused the militia of killing, abusing and looting civilians in Faryab Province during June. They also accused them of supporting the Taliban.
