= Order of the Red Banner (Afghanistan) =

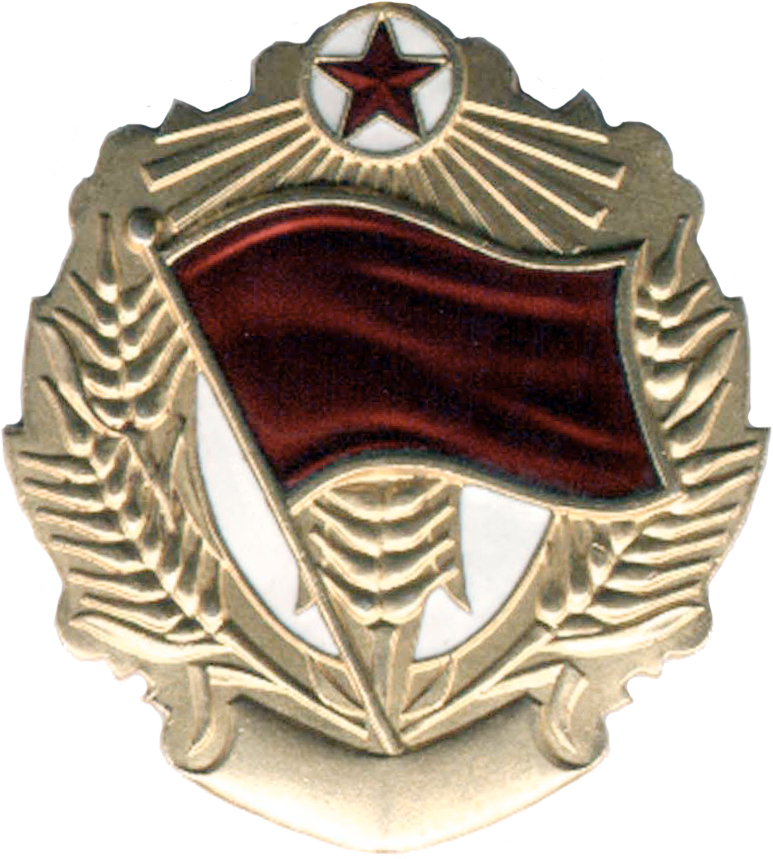
- Type: single-grade order
- Awarded for: Heroism in combat
- Presented by: Democratic Republic of Afghanistan
- Eligibility: Afghan and foreign citizens, military units and formations, military schools, and institutions
- Status: No longer awarded
- Established: 1980
- Ribbon of the award
- Related: Order of the Red Banner (Soviet)

The Order of the Red Banner (Pashto: د سره بینر امر) was a military decoration of the Democratic Republic of Afghanistan. The medal had been awarded to Afghan citizens as well as foreigners and institutions for services to the state.

== Overview ==
The order was established on December 24, 1980. The grounds for the award were: feats performed in a combat situation and with a clear danger to life, outstanding combat leadership, excellent combat actions of military units and military formations, concrete successes in economic and cultural development. It was last awarded in 1992. Many soldiers who served in the Soviet–Afghan War were awarded the order.

== Recipients ==
- Dmitry Yazov
- Norat Ter-Grigoryants
- Boris Gromov
- Sergey Sokolov (marshal)
- Pavel Grachev
- Vladimir Kuznetsov
- 15th Independent Special Forces Brigade
- Military Logistics Academy
- General Khushal Peroz
- Abdul Rashid Dostum
- Shahnawaz Tanai
- Mohammed Najibullah
