= List of Pakistani detainees at Guantanamo Bay =

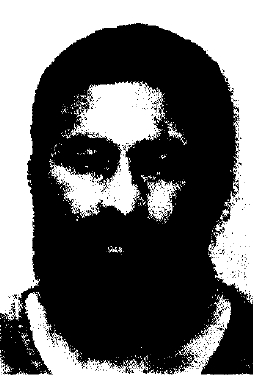
Official Guantanamo picture of Zia Ul Shah.

According to the United States Department of Defense, there were five dozen Pakistani detainees in Guantanamo prior to May 15, 2006. The Guantanamo Bay detention camp was opened on January 11, 2002. In the summer of 2004, following the United States Supreme Court's ruling in Rasul v. Bush, the Department of Defense stopped transferring men and boys to Guantanamo. The Supreme Court determined that the detainees had to be given a chance to challenge their detentions in an impartial tribunal.

On September 6, 2006 United States President George W. Bush announced the transfer of 14 high-value detainees from CIA custody to military custody at Guantanamo, including several additional Pakistanis.

On September 7, 2008, Pakistan's Daily Times newspaper quoted Hussain Haqqani, Pakistan Ambassador to the United States, that only five Pakistanis remained in captivity in Guantanamo: Ume Amaar Al Balochi, Majid Khan, Ghulam Rabbani and Saifullah. A sixth man, Qari Muhammad Saeed, was reported to have been released on August 29, 2008.

== Pakistanis detainees in Guantanamo ==
Pakistani detainees
isn	name	arrival date	release date	notes
	Dunya Gul		2010-03-09	Reported to have spent four years in US custody, and then to have been transferred to Afghan custody.; Reports severe torture in both Bagram and Guantanamo.; Reportedly only able to return to his home in Pakistan in March 2010.
00010	Abdul Sattar	2002-05-05	2004-09-17	Repatriated on 17 September 2004.
00011	Abdul Satar Nafeesi	2002-01-14	2004-09-17	Repatriated on 17 September 2004.; According to Pakistan's The Nation, Nafeesi reported that he was tortured. He was quoted as saying: "The Americans removed our beards and have been spitting over the holy Book,"
00012	Shabidzada Usman	2002-01-11	2003-05-09	Repatriated on 9 May 2003.; Mark Bowden, writing in The Philadelphia Inquirer, described traveling to Pakistan to interview Shabidzada and Shah Muhammad, another young Pakistani who was among the first captives to be released. Bowden described being met by "warmth and elaborate courtesy" by the two released men, who he described as "uneducated, unworldly, and dirt poor". Bowden believed their accounts that they were rounded up and sold to the Americans by undiscriminating warlords, for a bounty, who didn't care if they were innocent.
00014	Zafar Iqbal	2002-01-20	2004-09-17	Repatriated on 17 September 2004.; Iqbal was one of 17 Pakistanis freed from Pakistani custody, approximately seven months after being repatriated from Guantanamo to Pakistan. June 28, 2005.; The Daily Times reported that Zafaar Iqbal was from Jhang.
00015	Zia Ul Shah	2002-01-14	2006-10-11	Repatriated on 11 October 2006.; One of 66 former detainees interviewed by the McClatchy News Service.
00016	Jamal Muhammad Al-Deen	2002-01-14	2003-07-16	Repatriated on 16 July 2003.
00017	Muhammed Ijaz Khan	2002-01-14	2004-09-17	Repatriated on 17 September 2004.; First detainee to attend a Combatant Status Review Tribunal to be repatriated.
00018	Mohammed Sayed	2002-01-14	2004-09-17	Repatriated on 17 September 2004.
00019	Sha Mohammed Alikhel	2002-01-14	2003-05-09	Repatriated on 9 May 2003.; Reported being administered powerful psychoactive drugs in captivity. Reported on-going suicidal impulses after release.
00020	Mohammed Isha	2002-01-14	2003-11-18	Repatriated on 18 November 2003.
00021	Salah Hudin	2002-01-20	2003-07-16	Repatriated on 16 July 2003.
00023	Isa Khan	2002-01-20	2004-09-17	Repatriated on 17 September 2004.; One of 66 former detainees interviewed by the McClatchy News Service.
00047	Asad Ullah	2002-01-17	2003-07-16	Repatriated on 16 July 2003.; One of 66 former captives interviewed by the McClatchy News Service.
00085	Munir Bin Naseer		2003-11-30	Repatriated on 30 November 2003.; One of 66 former captives interviewed by the McClatchy News Service.
00097	Tariq Khan	2002-06-16	2003-07-16	Repatriated on 16 July 2003.
00098	Hafiz Ihsan Saeed	2002-01-20	2004-09-17	Repatriated on 17 September 2004.
00099	Abdul Raziq	2002-06-16	2003-07-16	Repatriated on 16 July 2003.
00100	Mohammed Ashraf	2002-05-05	2004-09-17	Repatriated on 17 September 2004.; Pakistan's Daily Times reports that Mohammed Asharf was born in Khoshab.; He spent a further nine months in Pakistani custody upon his repatriation.
00101	Mohammed Irfan	2002-02-09	2004-09-17	Repatriated on 17 September 2004.
00106	Mohammed Raz	2002-02-10	2003-07-16	Repatriated on 16 July 2003.
00113	Said Saim Ali	2002-05-05	2004-09-17	Repatriated on 17 September 2004.
00134	Ghaser Zaban Safollah	2002-01-17	2003-07-16	Repatriated on 16 July 2003.
00135	Ejaz Ahmad Khan	2002-06-12	2003-11-18	Repatriated on 18 November 2003.
00136	Tarik Mohammad	2002-01-15	2003-11-30	Repatriated on 30 November 2003.
00137	Mohammed Tariq	2002-01-18	2004-09-17	Repatriated on 17 September 2004.
00138	Salahodin Ayubi	2002-01-18	2004-09-17	Repatriated on 17 September 2004.
139	Hafice Leqeat Manzu	2002-01-17	2003-11-18	Repatriated on 18 November 2003.
00140	Said Saim Ali	2002-01-17	2004-09-17	Repatriated on 17 September 2004.
00141	Haseeb Ayub	2002-01-18	2004-09-17	Repatriated on 17 September 2004.; The US Department of Defense reports that he was born on January 8, 1974, in Budho, Pakistan.; He spent a further nine months in Pakistani custody upon his repatriation.
00142	Fazaldad	2002-05-03	2004-09-17	Repatriated on 17 September 2004.
00143	Mohammad Sanghir	2002-01-18	2002-10-28	Saghir was one of the first four detainees to be released from Guantanamo.; Saghir is suing the United States for $10.4 million for the torture and abuse he reports he endured.; Saghir has been frequently sought out for interviews.; Repatriated on 28 October 2002.
00144	Mohammad Il Yas	2002-01-17	2004-09-17	Repatriated on 17 September 2004.
00145	Hamood Ullah Khan	2002-01-15	2004-09-17	Repatriated on 17 September 2004.
00146	Mohammad Kashef Khan	2002-01-18	2003-07-16	
00147	Mohammed Arshad Raza	2002-01-18	2004-09-17	Repatriated on 17 September 2004.; American intelligence analysts estimate that he was born in 1980, in Bahawal Nagar, Pakistan.; He spent a further nine months in Pakistani custody upon his repatriation.
00210	Faik Iqbal	2002-01-21	2003-07-16	Repatriated on 16 July 2003.
00247	Kay Fiyatullah	2002-06-12	2004-09-17	Repatriated on 17 September 2004.
00299	Abid Raza	2002-06-12	2004-09-17	Repatriated on 17 September 2004.; Alleged to have traveled to Afghanistan to fight "hindus".
00300	Zahid Sultan	2002-02-07	2004-09-17	Repatriated on 17 September 2004.
00301	Khalil Rahman Hafez	2002-02-08	2004-09-17	Repatriated on 17 September 2004.
00302	Mohamed Ijaz	2002-02-11	2004-09-17	Repatriated on 17 September 2004.
00303	Ali Ahmed	2002-02-12	2003-07-16	Repatriated on 16 July 2003.
00304	Mohammed Ansar	2002-02-09	2003-07-16	Repatriated on 16 July 2003.
00305	Hanif Mohammed	2002-02-17	2004-09-17	Was one of 17 Pakistanis freed from Pakistani custody, approximately seven months after being repatriated from Guantanamo to Pakistan. June 28, 2005.; Repatriated on 17 September 2004.
00442	Abdul Mowla	2002-06-12	2003-07-16	Repatriated on 16 July 2003.
00444	Jihan Wali	2002-06-12	2003-05-09	Repatriated on 9 May 2003.; Shah Mohammed, one of the other Pakistani men released at the same time he was, told the BBC that they were given psychoactive drugs, and that Jehan Wali had not spoken for eight months.
00495	Mohammed Rafiq	2002-05-05	2004-09-17	Repatriated on 17 September 2004.
00504	Aminullah Amin	2002-05-03	2004-09-17	Repatriated on 17 September 2004.
00515	Israr Ul Haq	2002-06-12	2004-03-14	Repatriated on 14 March 2004.
00524	Mohammed Anwar	2002-05-03	2004-09-17	Repatriated on 17 September 2004.
00529	Bacha Khan	2002-06-16	2004-09-17	Repatriated on 17 September 2004.
00540	Mohammed Omar	2002-10-28	2004-09-17	Repatriated on 17 September 2004.; One of 66 former captives interviewed by the McClatchy News Service.
00541	Mohammed Noman	2002-06-16	2004-09-17	Repatriated on 17 September 2004.
00542	Mohammad Abas	2002-06-16	2004-03-14	Repatriated on 14 March 2004.
00545	Sajin Urayman	2002-06-12	2003-07-16	Repatriated on 16 July 2003.
00581	Abdur Sayed Rahaman	2002-06-16	2005-03-11	Repatriated on 11 March 2005.
00586	Karam Khamis Sayd Khamsan	2002-05-01	2005-08-19	Determined not to be an "enemy combatant" after all.
00624	Majid Mehmood	2002-06-12	2003-11-18	Repatriated on 18 November 2003.
00634	Ali Mohammed	2002-06-16	2004-03-14	Repatriated on 14 March 2004.
00743	Hafez Qari Mohamed Saad Iqbal Madni	2003-03-23	2008-08-31	Repatriated on 31 August 2008.
00830	Tila Mohammed Khan	2002-10-28	2003-11-18	Repatriated on 18 November 2003.
00842	Sultan Ahmad	2003-02-07	2004-09-17	Was minor when captured.; Repatriated on 17 September 2004.; The Daily Times reported that Sultan Ahmad and sixteen other former captives were released from Pakistani custody on June 28, 2005.
00843	Saghir Ahmed	2003-02-07	2004-09-17	Repatriated on 17 September 2004.
01005	Bashir Ahmad	2003-05-09	2004-09-17	Described horrific abuse in Sheberghan Prison, Bagram and Guantanamo.; Repatriated on 17 September 2004.; The Daily Times reported that Bashir Ahmed and sixteen other former captives were released from Pakistani custody on June 28, 2005.
01006	Mohammed Irfan	2003-05-09	2004-09-17	Repatriated on 17 September 2004.
01007	Abdul Halim Sadiqi	2003-05-09	2006-10-11	Repatriated on 11 October 2006.
01011	Mohammed Akbar	2003-05-09	2004-09-17	Repatriated on 17 September 2004.
01094	Saifullah Paracha			
01460	Abdul Al-Rahim Ghulam Rabbani	2004-09-20		Was held in the CIA's dark prison prior to transfer to Guantanamo.
01461	Mohammed Ahmad Ghulam Rabbani	2004-09-20		Was held in the CIA's dark prison prior to transfer to Guantanamo.
10018	Ammar al-Baluchi			
10020	Majid Khan	2006-09-06		Was held in the CIA's black sites prior to transfer to Guantanamo.
10024	Khalid Sheikh Mohammed	2006-09-06		Was held in the CIA's black sites prior to transfer to Guantanamo.; Was waterboarded in CIA custody; Confessed to a role in practically every terrorist attack of the last fifteen years.
