= List of Taliban provincial governors =

This is a list of provincial governors of the Taliban (Islamic Emirate of Afghanistan) from 1996 to 2001. Much of the information is drawn from a United Nations list of senior Taliban leaders.

Taliban provincial governors
Honorific	Name	Province	Notes
Mullah	Mohammad Hasan Rahmani	Kandahar Province	
Maulavi	Abdul Kabir	Nangahar Province	Second Deputy, Council of Ministers; Head of Eastern Zone
Maulavi	Abdul Jabbar Omari	Baghlan Province	Guarded Mohammed Omar in the years after the US invasion.
Maulavi	Norullah Noori	Balkh Province	Head of Northern Zone
	Muhammad Islam	Bamiyan Province	
Mullah	Janan	Faryab Province	
Mullah	Dost Mohammad	Ghazni Province	
Maulavi	Khair Mohammad Khairkhwah	Herat Province	
Maulavi	Abdul Bari	Helmand Province	
Maulavi	Nazar Mohammad	Kunduz Province	
Maulavi	Walijan	Jawzjan Province	
Mullah	Manan Nyazi	Kabul Province	Deputy leader of a Taliban faction led by Mullah Akhtar Mohammad Mansour. Died 15 May 2021 in a Kabul hospital from gunshot wounds inflicted by unknown gunmen in Herat Province.
Maulavi	A. Wahed Shafiq	Kabul Province	Deputy Governor
Maulavi	Shafiqullah Mohammadi	Khost Province	Appointed the Governor of Khost in January 2000.
	M. Eshaq	Laghman Province	
Maulavi	Zia ur Rahman Madani	Logar Province	
Maulavi	Hamsudin	Maidan Wardak Province	
Mullah	Muhammad Rasul	Nimroz Province	
Maulavi	Tawana	Paktia Province	
Mullah	M. Shafiq	Samangan Province	
Maulavi	Aminullah Amin	Sar-e Pol Province	
Maulavi	Abdulhai Salek	Urozgan Province	
Maulavi	Ahmad Jan	Zabol Province	The News International reported that "According to well-informed diplomatic circles in Islamabad..." he had been a member of the Quetta Shura, prior to his capture in February 2010.
