= Abdul Salam Zaeef =

2000–2001 Afghan ambassador to Pakistan

Mullah Abdul Salam Zaeef الحاج ملا عبدالسلام ضعيف
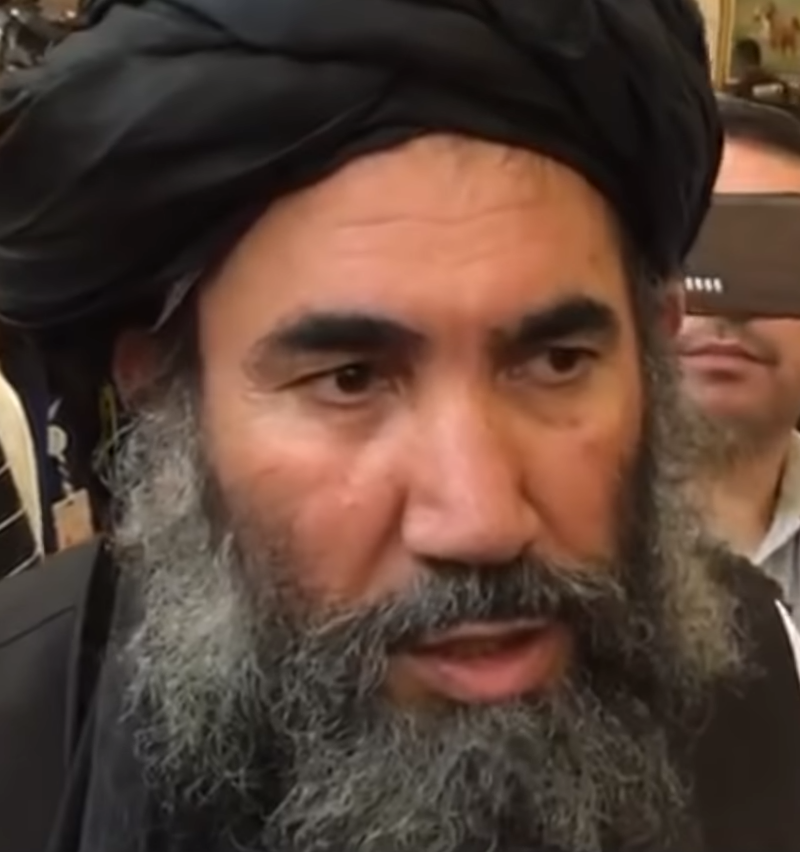
- Zaeef in 2020

Afghan Ambassador to Pakistan
- In office 2000–2001

Personal details
- Born: 1967 (age 58–59) Zangiabad, Kandahar Province, Kingdom of Afghanistan
- Party: Islamic and National Revolution Movement of Afghanistan; Taliban

Mullah Abdul Salam Zaeef (/ˈæbdʊl səˈlɑːm zɑːˈiːf/; born 1967) is an Afghan former militant and Taliban official who served as the Afghan ambassador to Pakistan from 2000 to 2001.

He was detained in Pakistan in the fall of 2001, following the US invasion of Afghanistan, and held until 2005 in the Guantanamo Bay detainment camp. The United Nations removed Zaeef from its list of terrorists in July 2010.

== Early life ==
Zaeef was born in 1967 to a poor family in the small village of Zangiabad, between the Arghandab and Dori rivers, in the Panjwayi District of Kandahar Province in southern Afghanistan. His family had moved there a few years earlier, because of fighting over land in their home village of Jaldak in Zabul Province. His uncle, Mullah Nezam, was accused of killing 16 people in the fighting and was later killed by government forces. Zaeef's mother died when he was one or two years old. The family moved to Mushan, another village nearby, and then to Rangrezan in Maywand District. His father died in 1975. Zaeef was taken to live with an aunt and cousins at Charshakha, then in Panjwayi District and now in Zhari District, for a year and a half. He then was taken to live with a maternal uncle and studied at a madrassa at Singesar, receiving a basic religious education in the years before the Soviet invasion. In 1978 he attended primary school in Kandahar city for a year. That year the Communists took power in Afghanistan and fighting broke out between mujahideen and the government. He fled with his relatives and many others to Pakistan in January 1979, when he was 10 years old, ending up in a refugee camp in Nushki, Balochistan.

== Role in the Soviet–Afghan War ==
He returned to Afghanistan to fight with the mujahideen in 1983, when he was 15, without telling his relatives. After two months with a mujahideen group at Pashmol (now in Zhari District), he joined a group of fighting taliban (Islamic students and scholars) at Nelgham, not far from some of his childhood villages. A few days later, they were attacked by Afghan army and Soviet forces for ten days, before the taliban fled to Zangiabad. There the mujahideen were attacked for another ten days, with hundreds of mujahideen and civilians killed. Then the fighting moved to Pashmol for two weeks, until the mujahideen were driven out. Zaeef's group continued to operate from Nelgham, sometimes travelling by foot as far as Helmand or Uruzgan Provinces to fight, and undertaking religious study at the same time. After nearly a year with the taliban, he was ordered to take a badly wounded comrade to Pakistan for treatment, and there he reunited with his relatives, who had settled in Quetta. There he resumed school and religious studies for nine months. Then he received training from Pakistan's Inter-Services Intelligence in rocket systems, before re-entering Afghanistan in 1985. While on the way to Kandahar, his group was ambushed, one of nine times he was ambushed during the war, and Zaeef was shot in the waist, after which he was taken back to Pakistan.

He fought in Kandahar Province for the next few years. He fought for weeks in the Battle of Arghandab in 1987, including at Sangisar, when Mullah Omar was one of the commanders and was wounded, losing an eye. It was the last big battle in southern Kandahar. By 1988 Zaeef was a junior commander. In an attack on Kandahar Airport that year, he commanded 58 men and the fighting was so intense that 50 of them were killed.

== Taliban ==
After the Soviet withdrawal from Afghanistan in 1989, he worked as a laborer and as a mullah in a village. Troubled by lawlessness that developed in Kandahar, in 1991 he took his wife and children and moved to Pakistan. In 1992 he returned and became the imam of a mosque in a small village near Kandahar. In 1994 he started to meet with other veterans of the war with the Soviets who wanted to take action against lawlessness and rogue mujahideen commanders who were controlling roads and cities. In the autumn of that year they approached various people to be their operational leader, including Mohammed Omar, who was living at Sangisar, who agreed. Forty to fifty people attended the founding meeting of what became known as the Taliban at the White Mosque at Sangisar. They started to apply sharia in the local area and set up a checkpoint on Highway 1 nearby. They gained support quickly and soon had 400 members. When rogue mujahideen on the highway through Maywand and Panjwayi districts refused to stop extorting and harassing road users, they attacked them. From there they then cleared the roads in Kandahar city and up to the border with Pakistan.

Once they had control of Kandahar, Zaeef was appointed to assist a sharia judge. In 1995 he was put in charge of the banks in Herat Province, which he did for two years. After the Taliban took control of Kabul, he was sent there to work in the Defence Ministry, and for nine months filled in as Defence minister, while Obaidullah was in Pakistan receiving treatment for an injury. He worked there for over a year and a half before resigning. He did not wish to return to work in the government, but the Taliban leaders appointed him deputy minister of Mines and Industry, a post he held for 18 months. Then he became head of transportation administration. Then in 2000 he was appointed ambassador to Pakistan, a post he held through the US attack on Afghanistan until 20 November 2001, when Pakistan ceased recognition of the Islamic Emirate of Afghanistan. Pakistani authorities arrested him in Islamabad on 2 January 2002 and sent him to Peshawar, where he was handed over to US operatives.

== Repatriation ==
Zaeef was imprisoned at Bagram, then at Kandahar from 10 February to 1 July 2002, then at Guantanamo Bay detention camp in Cuba. He was released from Guantanamo Bay on 11 September 2005 and arrived back in Afghanistan the next day. In an article in the Daily Times on 18 September 2005, he was quoted as saying that his release was "due to the effort of some friends". He did not attribute his release to his Combatant Status Review Tribunal or his 2005 Administrative Review Board hearing. He described the actions of these two bodies as illegal.

Zaeef claims he was chained in illegal "stress positions" and subjected to sleep deprivation and extremes of temperature while held in the USA's Bagram Theater Detention Facility.

== Recent events ==
On 12 April 2007, Zaeef stirred controversy by calling for a unity-government in Afghanistan.

On Friday, 6 June 2008, The Guardian published excerpts from an interview with Zaeef. It reported he claimed negotiations with the Taliban was the key to peace and that he argued that the presence of foreign troops eroded the authority of the central government:

"As long as the foreign troops are here, negotiations with the government will be difficult."

An article in Der Spiegel on 12 April 2007 reported that Zaeef had moved into a "...handsome guest house, located in the dusty modern neighborhood Khoshal Khan." The article in Der Spiegel stated that the new home Karzai's government has provided Zaeef is around the corner from one occupied by former Taliban Foreign Minister Wakil Ahmed Muttawakil. Der Spiegel described Zaeef's home as being guarded, inside and out, by a heavily armed security detail. Der Spiegel described both Zaeef and Muttawakil as regarded as among the more moderate former members of the Taliban. Zaeef told the Chicago Tribune that Afghan security officials would not allow him to attend the mosque near his Kabul home.

"There is a mosque near my house. The government told me, 'Please don't go to the mosque', for my security. If I can't go to the mosque, how can I work?"

On 15 June 2008, the McClatchy News Service published articles based on interviews with 66 former Guantanamo captives, including Abdul Salam Zaeef. The McClatchy reports state that guards told him he was the "King of the prison", and that he took a lead role in the Guantanamo hunger strikes. They also state that guards in the Kandahar detention facility made him pointlessly move human excrement back and forth.

Zaeef acknowledged being invited by Saudi King Abdullah to unofficially meet with other leading Afghan figures from the Karzai government, the Taliban, Gulbuddin Hekmatyar's Hezb-e-Islami and other former members of the Taliban. Zaeef denied this meeting should be characterized as "peace talks" and stated that none of the individuals at this meeting had been authorized to conduct negotiations. Zaeef denied anyone discussed Afghanistan at this meeting. According to The Age, other figures who attended the meeting included former Taliban Foreign Minister Wakil Ahmad Mutawakil and former Supreme Court Chief Justice Fazel Hadi Shinwari.

In October 2008, Zaeef said he would sue Pakistan for his arrest there in 2002.

On 9 April 2012, Al Jazeera reported that Zaeef had fled to the United Arab Emirates, quoting associates close to Zaeef who described repeated US attempts by US forces to raid Zaeef's house and seize him. Zaeef had been in protective custody by the Afghan government since his release from Guantanamo.

Quoting Al Jazeera's Waheed Muzhda:

"Zaeef feared for his life in the wake of the attempted raids on his home. Many of the Taliban prisoners freed from Guantanamo had been killed in night raids and that made Zaeef more nervous."

In 2013, Mullah Zaeef met with Robert Grenier at a conference in which they discussed the invasion and the general positions of the Taliban government and the United States.

== Publications ==
In mid-2006 Zaeef released a book in the Pashto language, A Picture of Guantanamo, detailing his mistreatment at Guantanamo. In October 2008, he edited the book "Prisonnier à Guantanamo", EGDV/Documents, 2008, with French journalist Jean-Michel Caradec'h.

In January 2010, an English translation of Abdul Salam Zaeef's autobiography was published, My Life with the Taliban. The book has been reviewed positively as offering a powerful look into what "drives" the Taliban.

== See also ==
- Prisoner abuse
- Bagram torture and prisoner abuse
