= Mirza Olang =

Mirza Olang میرزاولنگ
- Village
- Location within Afghanistan
- Coordinates: 35°58′34.18″N 65°47′52.1″E
- Country: Afghanistan
- Province: Sar-e Pol Province
- District: Sayyad District
- Time zone: UTC+4:30

Mirza Olang (Dari: میرزاولنگ) is a village in Sayyad District, Sar-e Pol Province in Afghanistan. It is located about 10 kilometres (6.2 mi) out of Sar-e Pol city and is considered to be within its defensive belt. Most residents of Mirza Olang are Shia Hazaras. As of 2017, about 700 families live in Mirza Olang Village.
