= Ijaz Khan =

Ijaz Khan or Ejaz Khan may refer to:

- Ijaz Khan (cricketer) (1938–2019), a Pakistani cricketer
- Ejaz Khan, a Pakistani politician
- Eijaz Khan, an Indian actor
- Ejaz Ahmad Khan, a Pakistani Guantanamo detainee

== See also ==
- Ajaz Khan (born 1981), Indian actor
