= Sha Mohammed Alikhel =

Pakistani detainee (born 1981)

- Born: 1981 (age 44–45); Swaat, Pakistan
- Detained at: Guantanamo
- Other name: Shah Muhammad
- ISN: 19
- Charge: No charge (extrajudicial detention)
- Status: Repatriated 8 May 2003

Sha Mohammed Alikhel (born 1981) is a Pakistani who was held in extrajudicial detention in the United States Guantanamo Bay detention camps, in Cuba. On 8 May 2003, Muhammad was released at the same time as two other Pakistanis, Jehan Wali and Sahibzada Usman Ali. He was 20 years old.

Muhammad is a baker from Dir, in the Khyber Pakhtunkhwa, Pakistan.

Only one other Pakistani detainee, elderly Mohammed Saghir, had been released prior to his release.

Shah reported that he felt despair, and made four suicide attempts during his time in Guantanamo, even though suicide was against the tenets of Islam.

When The Guardian interviewed Muhammad, a year after his release, Muhammad reported ongoing after-effects from his incarceration: "The biggest damage is to my brain. My physical and mental state isn't right. I'm a changed person. I don't laugh or enjoy myself much."

The Guardian reports that Muhammad's first suicide attempt followed a month of solitary confinement in a punishment cell. Muhammad was not confined there because he had broken any of the camp rules — rather the camp's expansion meant they had run short of ordinary cells.

Muhammad reported having his suicidal impulses treated by involuntary injections with extremely powerful, long-lasting, psychoactive drugs.

The Department of Defense released a list of all the captives who had been detained in Guantanamo, in military custody on 15 May 2006. Muhammad Shah's name is missing from that list.

Mark Bowden, writing in The Philadelphia Inquirer, described traveling to Pakistan to interview Shah Muhammad and Shabidzada Usman, another young Pakistani who was among the first captives to be released. Bowden described being met by "warmth and elaborate courtesy" by the two released men, who he described as "uneducated, unworldly, and dirt poor". Bowden believed their accounts that they were rounded up and sold to the Americans by undiscriminating warlords, for a bounty, who didn't care if they were innocent.

On an official list of the captives' departure dates from Guantanamo published in November 2008, his name was published as "Sha Mohammed Alikhel".

== Claim that he was killed fighting U.S. forces ==
On 7 April 2009, the Defense Intelligence Agency drafted a report, published on 27 May 2009, that listed a "Shah Mohammed" as having been "killed while fighting U.S. forces in Afghanistan". Despite the report, there are tens of thousands of "Shah Mohammeds" in Afghanistan.

== See also ==
- Guantanamo suicide attempts
- Solitary confinement
