= Mohammed Akbar =

Mohammed Akbar or Muhammad Akbar may refer to:

- Mohammad Akbar Khan or Akbar Khan (1816–1845), Emir of Afghanistan and son of Dost Mohammed Khan
- Muhammad Akbar (Mughal prince) (1657–1706), Mughal prince
- Mohammed Akbar, Pakistani, former Guantanamo detainee (Internment Serial Number: 1011)
