= Tariq Khan (Guantanamo detainee) =

- Detained at: Guantanamo
- ISN: 97
- Status: Repatriated

Tariq Khan is a citizen of Pakistan who was held in extrajudicial detention in the United States's Guantanamo Bay detention camps, in Cuba, for over a year.

He arrived in Guantanamo on 16 June 2002. He was repatriated on 16 July 2003.

== McClatchy News Service interview ==
On 15 June 2008, the McClatchy News Service published a series of articles based on interviews with 66 former Guantanamo captives. Tariq Khan was one of the former captives who had an article profiling him.

At the time of his interview, Tariq Khan was working as a real estate agent in Pakistan. His McClatchy interviewer described his account of his travel to Afghanistan as far-fetched.

He said that in November 2001 he had traveled to Quetta, a city in Pakistan near the Afghan's southern border, to buy a quantity of cigarettes to sell. His visit coincided with Ramadam. And, at the mosque he went to pray at in Quetta he agreed to accompany some religious pilgrims—not realizing that they planned to cross the Afghan border. Tariq Khan told his interviewer:

""Most Americans don't know the difference between missionary work and going on jihad."

Tariq Khan described his group of pilgrims being captured near Mazari Sharif, nine days later. Mazari Sharif is across the mountains in the north of Afghanistan. Tariq Khan described being crammed into crowded shipping containers by troops under the command of General Dostum, where many of his fellow captives died. He said Dostum's troops fired into the containers, while they were crammed with men.

He described spending several months crammed into a small cell in Dostum's prison at Sherberghan. He said the cell was so crowded the men had to take turns sitting down, because there was not enough room for them all to sit down at the same time. He then spent another six months in US custody in the Kandahar detention facility.

Tariq Khan's interviewer described him losing confidence as he spoke, and declining to answer questions about seeing Koran desecration, or to answer questions about conditions at Guantanamo. He said that he had to check in with Pakistani security officials every day, and he was afraid he would be punished for talking to a western reporter.
