= Sar-e-Pol District =

Sar-e Pol سرپل
- District
- Location in Afghanistan
- Coordinates: 36°13′17″N 65°55′40″E
- Country: Afghanistan
- Province: Sar-e-Pol
- Capital: Sar-e Pol

Population
  - Ethnicities: Uzbeks; Hazaras; Tajiks; Pashtuns
  - Religions: Islam
- Time zone: UTC+4:30
- Main languages: Persian; Uzbek; Pashto

Sar-e-Pol District (Dari: سرپل) is a district of Sar-e-Pol Province, Afghanistan. It contains the capital, Sar-e-Pol. The estimated population in 2019 was 173,719.

== See also ==
- Districts of Afghanistan
