= Sozma Qala District =

Sozma Qala سوزمه قلعه
- District
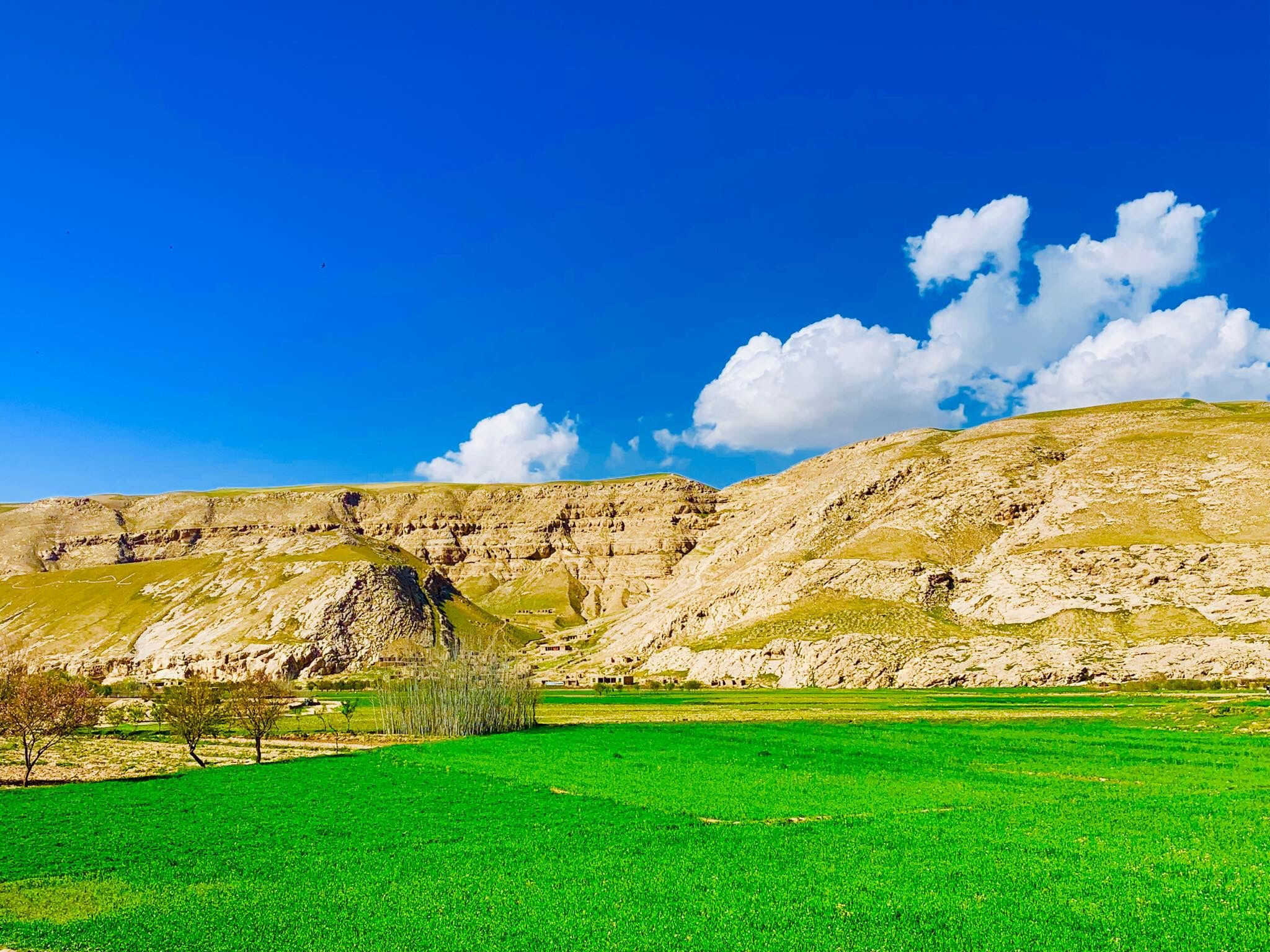
- Interactive map of Sozma Qala
- Coordinates: 36°13′17″N 65°55′40″E
- Country: Afghanistan
- Province: Sar-e Pol

Government
- Elevation: 850 m (2,790 ft)

Population
  - Total: 63.172
  - Ethnicities: Uzbek.hazara.pashtun
  - Religions: Islam
- Time zone: UTC+4:30
- Area code: 2154

Sozma Qala District (Pashto: سوزمه قلعه Dari: سوزمه قلعه) is a district of Sar-e Pol Province, Afghanistan. Sozma Qala district is one of the 7 districts of Sarpul province, centered in Sozma Qala city in northern Afghanistan. Sozma Qala is one of the second-class districts of Sarpol province, it has an area of 787 square kilometers and is the seventh largest district of Sarpol. This district with a population of 55,993 in 2019 is the seventh most populous district of Sarpul province.[1]

This district is located in the east of Sarpul province. Suzeme Qala district is bordered by Sarpol district from the west and Balkh province from the east. The estimated population in 2019 was 54,970.

== See also ==
- Districts of Afghanistan
