= Abdul Majid Mahmoud =

Pakistani Guantanamo detainee

- Born: March 3, 1979 (age 47)
- Released: 18 November 2003
- Citizenship: Pakistan
- Detained at: Guantanamo
- ISN: 624
- Charge: No charge (extrajudicial detention)
- Status: Repatriated

Abdul Majid Mahmoud (born March 3, 1979) was held in extrajudicial detention in the United States's Guantanamo Bay detention camp in Cuba. His Guantanamo Internment Serial Number was 624.

Majid Mehmood was transferred to Pakistan on November 18, 2003.

== McClatchy News Service interview ==
On June 15, 2008, the McClatchy News Service published a series of articles based on interviews with 66 former Guantanamo captives. Abdul Majid Mahmoud was one of the former captives who had an article profiling him.

Abdul Majid Mahmoud said he was captured by Afghans in December 2001, held in brutal conditions, for four months. He had shrapnel wounds when he was captured, but told his Afghan interrogators that he had traveled to Afghanistan merely to attend a wedding.

He said one of his Afghan captors told him he was being sold to the Americans for $5000.

He said he decided to tell his American interrogators the truth, that he had been recruited by the Taliban in Karachi. He said he was completely truthful during the four or five months he was held in the Kandahar detention facility. However, he noted, he was not treated any better than captives who continued to lie to their interrogators, and was sent to Guantanamo for further interrogation.

In 2003, he was force-fed when he joined a hunger strike to protest guards desecrating the koran.

The McClatchy reporters imply that Abdul Majid Mahmoud spent twenty months in Guantanamo. However, the DoD's records indicate he only spent about thirteen months total in US custody. He spent a further year in Pakistani detention after his repatriation.

== See also ==
- Qur'an desecration
- Force-feeding
