= Hamood Ullah Khan =

Pakistani Guantanamo detainee

- Detained at: Guantanamo
- Other name: Hamoodullah Khan
- ISN: 145
- Charge: No charge
- Status: Repatriated on 17 September 2004

Hamood Ullah Khan is a citizen of Pakistan who was held in extrajudicial detention in the United States's Guantanamo Bay detention camps, in Cuba. His Guantanamo Internment Serial Number was 145.

He was repatriated on September 17, 2004.

== McClatchy News Service interview ==
On June 15, 2008, the McClatchy News Service published a series of articles based on interviews with 66 former Guantanamo captives. Hamood Ullah Khan was one of three former captives who had an article profiling him.

Hamood Ullah Khan described being beaten so severely as soon as he arrived at the Kandahar detention facility that he passed out. McClatchy team reported that they got access to a confidential report on the effect on US detention on Hamood Ullah Khan and 34 other former captives:

"It became apparent during the interrogation that (the) majority of them had been subjected to severe mental and physical torture. Also, during their confinement they saw the most dreadful types of torture being perpetrated against their fellow detainees. All of this has left terrible scars on their minds."

Hamood Ullah Khan said he was a pharmaceutical representative, who had been in Afghanistan on business when he was captured. He said he had decided to be a model prisoner, and thus avoided the beatings he saw guards administer to other captives, and was transferred to camp 4, the camp for the most compliant captives.

Hamood Ullah described watching an Arab captive named Juma, who had chosen to be argumentative, and confront the guards—who: "Eventually he was totally mad.".

Hamood Ullah said he spent a further nine and a half months in Pakistani custody after he was repatriated.

At the time of his interview he was teaching at a madrassa.
