= Sayed Nasim Mihanparast =

Afghan politician

Sayed Nasim Mihanparast (Dari: سيد نسیم میهن پرست) was a political figure active in Afghanistan, particularly in Northern Afghanistan during the 1980s, when he played a key role in the establishment of Sar-e Pol Province in 1988. Historian of Afghanistan Neamatollah Nojumi notes that Mihanparast's citizenship is unclear, as he both served as an Afghan politician, and as an employee of a Soviet embassy and later Soviet deputy consul general in Balkh, as well as serving as a Soviet military officer.

A 1988 publication by the American Foreign Broadcast Information Service quoted a news report mentioning Seyyed Nasim Mihanparast Amerzun Shamal as "secretary of the Balkh Province party committee".
