= Gosfandi District =

Gosfandi گوسفندی
- District
- Location in Afghanistan
- Coordinates: 36°13′17″N 65°55′40″E
- Country: Afghanistan
- Province: Sar-e Pol
- Elevation: 1,220 m (4,000 ft)

Population
  - Religions: Islam
- Time zone: UTC+4:30

Gosfandi District (Dari: گوسفندی) is a district of Sar-e Pol Province, Afghanistan. After the Taliban's rise to power in the 1990s, they committed five massacres, killing some 96 people, in the district.

== See also ==
- Districts of Afghanistan
