= Asadullah Jan =

Pakistani Guantanamo detainee

- Born: Swahbi, Pakistan
- Citizenship: Pakistan
- Detained at: Guantanamo
- Other name: Asad Ullah
- ISN: 47
- Charge: No charge (held in extrajudicial detention)
- Status: Repatriated 16 July 2003

Asadullah Jan is a citizen of Pakistan who was held in extrajudicial detention in the United States's Guantanamo Bay detention camps, in Cuba. His Guantanamo Internment Serial Number was 47. Joint Task Force -- Guantanamo analysts estimated he was born in 1981. However, he has stated that he was only sixteen when he was captured in 2001.

Joint Task Force Guantanamo analysts asserted that he was a citizen of Pakistan. He said that although he was born in Pakistan, he was a child of Afghan refugees.

Joint Task Force Guantanamo analysts assert his name was "Asad Ullah". However, in interviews with reporters with the McClatchy News Service in 2008, he said his name was "Asadullah Jan".

He was repatriated July 16, 2003.

== McClatchy News Service interview ==
On June 15, 2008, the McClatchy News Service published a series of articles based on interviews with 66 former Guantanamo captives. Asadullah Jan was one of three former captives who had an article profiling him.

Asadullah Jan explained that he was returning from a visit to relatives in Zormat around the time of Ramadan in 2001 when he was stopped at a checkpoint in Kohat, Pakistan and apprehended. He was held in Pakistan for approximately a month before his first interrogation by Americans. His first interview was by a woman and two men, in civilian clothes, at the Pakistani jail.

His interpreter said they were with the CIA, although they did not identify themselves. He told his McClatchy interviewer their questions surprised him—apparently Pakistani security officials had told them he was a son of Osama bin Laden. The CIA officials had him transferred to US custody in the Kandahar detention facility. Guards beat him brutally upon his arrival, and routinely beat him and other captives, while he was detained there. His interrogators however never beat him. He described the conditions in the camp as primitive:

"We were sitting on the ground, in winter, with no blanket. I had bruises on my body from the beating; my bones hurt."

Asadullah Jan told his interviewer he personally saw a guard drop a Koran into a latrine.

Asadullah Jan told his interviewer he was plagued by memories of Guantanamo, and that mention of the USA would bring back troubling recollections.

== See also ==
- Minors detained in the War on Terror
