= Waheed Muzhda =

Afghan political analyst (1953–2019)

Ahmad Waheed Mozhdah
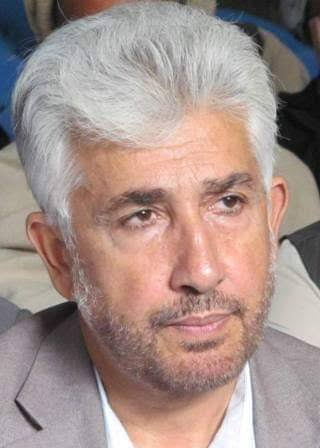
- Ahmad waheed Mozhdah
- Born: 1953; Baghlan province, Afghanistan
- Died: 20 November 2019 (aged 65–66); Kabul, Afghanistan
- Education: Kabul University
- Occupations: Political analyst, Journalist, columnist, author and peace activist

Ahmad Waheed Mozhdah (1953 – 20 November 2019) was a senior Afghan political analyst, writer and a peace activist. He was also a poet and wrote several anti-Soviet poetry during the Soviet Afghan war. He was widely cited by various international newspapers for his views on Afghan conflict. During his career, Muzhda criticized both the Taliban and the Afghan government. Muzhda was praised as a probing intellectual by many journalists and scholars. He was assassinated on 20 November 2019 in Kabul. Several political observers and experts believe that Muzhda was assassinated for his views by pro-government groups as 'a part of campaign to silence people with different views'. Previously, he was reported to have been arrested by Afghan intelligence agency NDS.

His death drew widespread condemnation from prominent Afghan officials with many describing his death as a loss for Afghan nation. Former Afghan President, Hamid Karzai, termed his death as an attack on freedom of speech in Afghanistan.

== Early life ==
Muzhda was born in 1953 in Baghlan province. He completed his elementary education at Habibia High School in Kabul, and later earned a bachelor's degree in economics from Kabul University.

== Soviet-Afghan war ==
During the Soviet Afghan war, Muzhda was a part Afghan Mujahideen and wrote several anti-Soviet poetry. In 1989, Time magazine reported that Muzhda was working as a translator for Dr Abdullah Azzam, a leader of Afghan Arabs—foreign fighters who had travelled to Afghanistan to help their fellow Muslims in opposition to the Soviet occupation of Afghanistan.

After Taliban took control of Afghanistan, Muzhda worked at Taliban's Foreign Ministry. However, he was never a part of any Taliban religious militia. After the fall of Taliban in 2001, Muzhda continued to stay in Kabul and started working for the new Afghan government.

== Later career ==
In 2013, during an interview with German newspaper Die Presse, Muzhda said that Taliban and Iran had links with each other since 2009 and these links have been ignored by the European and US media. He stated that Iran was supporting Taliban because it wanted to get rid of United States presence in Afghanistan.

Following the killing of Osama bin Laden, Muzdha, while talking to Associated Press (AP), said: "I think now is an opportunity for the Taliban to end their relations with al-Qaeda." Muzdha insisted that the Taliban's ties to bin Laden had weakened prior to his death.

On 9 April 2012, Al Jazeera quoted Muzhda after former colleague Abdul Salam Zaeef fled Afghanistan for the United Arab Emirates. Zaeef, like Muzhda, had worked in the Taliban's Foreign Ministry, and had served as the Taliban's Ambassador to Pakistan. Zaeef was held in the controversial Guantanamo Bay detention camps, in Cuba. Following his release, he served as a key intermediary between his former colleagues within the Taliban and American peace negotiators and he had been the target of repeated night raids. Muzhda explained that many other former Guantanamo captives who had been the target of night raids had been killed, not captured, and that Zaeef feared that US special forces would kill him in a future raid if he didn't leave Afghanistan.

Muzhda was also working toward ending war in Afghanistan and was actively involved in peace process. Qazi Hafizurrahman Naqi, an Afghan political analyst and a religious scholar, described the role of Muzhda as 'critical for bringing peace in Afghanistan'. He stated that 'Muzhda murder was stab in the back for the peace process'.

== Assassination ==
On 20 November 2019, Waheed Muzhda was assassinated in Kabul by two gunmen on a motorcycle while he was on his way to the Mosque near a Russian embassy.

No group claimed responsibility for killing him. However, political observers and experts believe that the pro-government groups were behind the killing of Muzhda. They believe that Muzhda was targeted because of his views.

=== Reaction ===
His killing drew widespread condemnation from prominent Afghan officials with many describing his death as "a loss for Afghan nation".

Former Afghan President, Hamid Karzai, condemned the killing of Muzhda and termed his murder as an "attack on civil liberties and freedom of speech in Afghanistan".

Omar Zakhilwal, a former Afghan envoy to Pakistan, also condemned the killing of Muzhda. He stated that "Muzhda killing is a part of an alarming trend of targeting individuals who work for peace and freedom of speech".

German ambassador to Afghanistan, Peter Prugel, also condemned the targeted assassination of Muzhda. He said that "dissenting voices and opinions must be heard and dealt with, not silenced".

Khairullah Shinwari, a political activist, said that "Afghanistan is not a good place for scholars. Anyone who talks about facts, gets killed. The freedom of speech in Afghanistan is just a slogan".

Abdul Karim Kuram, a former head of office at the Afghan presidential palace, insisted that "if this pattern continues, the funeral of the democracy will also be held, and the main responsibility for this will belong to the government."

Taliban also condemned the assassination of Muzhda and held Afghan intelligence agency, National Directorate of Security (NDS), responsible for the killing of Muzhda.

Muzhda's funeral took place on 21 November 2019 and was attended by prominent figures of all backgrounds.
