= Sar-e-Pol, Afghanistan =

Sar-e-Pol سر پل Anbar
- Provincial capital
- Location in Afghanistan
- Coordinates: 36°13′17″N 65°55′40″E
- Country: Afghanistan
- Province: Sar-e Pol
- District: Sar-e Pol

Government
  - Type: Municipality
  - Mayor: Qari Abdul Vakil Moaz

Area
  - Land: 30 km^{2} (12 sq mi)
- Elevation: 657 m (2,156 ft)

Population (2025)
  - Provincial capital: 134,809
  - Density: 4,500/km^{2} (12,000/sq mi)
  - Urban: 39,668
  - Rural: 66,932
- Time zone: UTC+04:30 (Afghanistan Time)
- ISO 3166 code: AF-SRP

Sar-e-Pol (Pashto (Note: Pashto pronunciation: [sa'ri.pul]), Dari (Note: Dari pronunciation: [sä.ɾɪ.pʰʊl]): سر پل; lit. 'bridge head'), also written as Sar-i-Pul, and historically known as Anbar (Pashto (Note: Pashto pronunciation: [ʔan.bar]), Dari (Note: Dari pronunciation: [ʔäm.bǽɾ]): انبر), is a city in northern Afghanistan, serving as the capital of Sar-e-Pol Province. The city is within the jurisdiction of Sar-e-Pol District and has an estimated population of 134,809 people (2025). Qari Abdul Vakil Moaz serves as the mayor of the city.

Sar-e-Pol sits at an elevation of about 2,155 ft (657 m) above sea level. It is connected by a road network with Sheberghan to the north, Tukzar to the southeast, and Maimana to the southwest. Its distance from Kabul is about 349 km (217 mi). Security is provided by the Afghan National Police.

Sar-e-Pol is home to the historic Imam Yahya Shrine, which is located in the eastern part of the city. There are also a number of bazaars, business centers, public parks, stadiums, banks, hotels, restaurants, mosques, hospitals, universities, and places to relax.

== Demographics ==
Sar-e-Pol has an estimated population of 134,809 people. In 2015, the city of Sar-e Pol had an estimated population of 115,000 people. There were 5,675 total number of dwellings in a total land area of 2,990 hectares.

A 1983 estimate put the population of the jurisdiction of Sar-e-Pol (Note: It is unclear whether jurisdiction in this context refers to the city itself or to the Sar-e-Pol woleswali (sub-governorate).) at around 150,000 people, consisting of approximately 40% Uzbeks, 25% Pashtuns (10% Durrani, 5% eastern Pashtuns and 10% non-Durrani Pashtuns), 20% Aimaqs and Tajiks, 10% Hazaras, 5% Arabs, and a small number of Turkmens.

== See also ==
- List of cities in Afghanistan
