= Zia ur Rahman Madani =

Afghan Taliban leader, former governor of the Logar Province

Mawlawi Zia ur Rahman Madani

Governor of Logar Province

Member of the Taliban negotiation team in Qatar

Personal details
- Born: 1960 (age 65–66) Takhar Province, Afghanistan
- Party: Taliban

Mawlawi Zia ur Rahman Madani (born 1960) is an Afghan Taliban leader, former governor of the Logar Province and member of the negotiation team in the Qatar office.

Madani is of Tajik origin and belongs to Takhar Province of Afghanistan.

== See also ==
- Abdul Salam Hanafi
