= Hafiz Liaqat Manzoor =

Pakistani Guantanamo detainee

- Detained at: Guantanamo
- ISN: 139
- Charge: No charge (held in extrajudicial detention)
- Status: Repatriated on 11 November 2003

Hafiz Liaqat Manzoor is a citizen of Pakistan who was held in extrajudicial detention in the United States's Guantanamo Bay detention camps, in Cuba. His Guantanamo Internment Serial Number was 139.

He was repatriated on November 11, 2003.

== McClatchy News Service interview ==
On June 15, 2008, the McClatchy News Service published a series of articles based on interviews with 66 former Guantanamo captives. Hafiz Liaqat Manzoor was one of three former captives who had an article profiling him.

Hafiz Liaqat Manzoor was a law student when he was interviewed by the McClatchy News Service. He acknowledged losing a finger during his stay in Afghanistan. He was held in General Dostum's prison in Sherberghan. Like many other captives, he described being locked in a crowded shipping container where many captives suffocated, or died when Dostum's troops fired into the container to make air holes.

He spent three weeks at Sherberghan, before he was transferred to US custody at the Kandahar detention facility. He said he was only interrogated once in Kandahar, before he was shipped to Guantanamo. He also said he personally witnessed Koran desecration there.

He said he only had a single interrogation in his first six months in Guantanamo. He said he had acknowledged traveling to Afghanistan to engage in Jihad. His interrogations began again when interrogators informed him that another captive had claimed he was a senior Taliban commander.

He spent a year in detention in Pakistan after his repatriation.

He told his interviewer that his experiences in custody convinced him of the importance of the rule of law, and had convinced him he should attend law school:

"Whatever I have been through so far in my life suggests that law is the only field"
