= Sancharak District =

Sancharak سانچارک
- District
- Location in Afghanistan
- Coordinates: 36°13′17″N 65°55′40″E
- Country: Afghanistan
- Province: Sar-e Pol
- Capital: Tukzar
- Elevation: 1,220 m (4,000 ft)

Population (87,670)
  - Religions: Islam
- Time zone: UTC+4:30

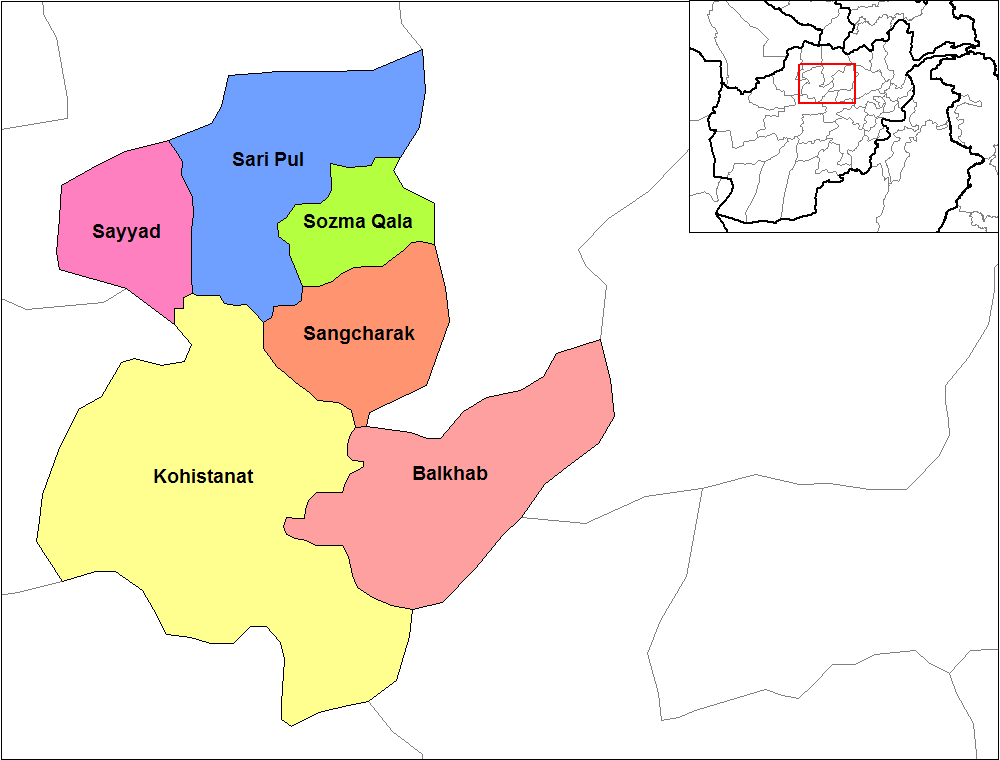
Sancharak District in Sar-e Pol Province

Sancharak District (Dari: سانچارک) or Sangcharak is a district of Sar-e Pol Province, Afghanistan. Its center is the city of Tukzar or Tokzar. Sancharak district borders Balkh Province in the east. Sancharak District's area is 1089 square kilometres.

== Population ==
The population of Sancharak district is 87,670 people as of 2010. About 44,287 males and 43,383 females.

== History ==
In the 1980s, Turkic nationalist Pahlawan Ghaffar led a 2000-man militia in the district.

== Economy ==
Agriculture represents the major source of income for three-quarters of the households in the district. The most important field crops grown in Sancharak district include wheat, maize, alfalfa, barley and flax. The most common crops grown in garden plots include Grapes (75%), fruit and nut trees like Almond and Walnut (Juglans regia) (16%) and vegetables (3%).

== Education ==
The overall literacy rate in Sancharak district is 12%, however, while nearly one in five (18%) of men are literate this is true for just over one in twenty (6%) women. In the population aged between 15 and 24 the men have a slightly lower literacy rate (17.7%), and so do women (4.8%). On average 29% of children between 6 and 13 are enrolled in school, however the figure is around one-third of boys (30%) and one-sixth of girls (15%).

== Transport Infrastructure ==
The transport infrastructure in Sancharak is not well developed with only 18.2% of roads in the district able to take car traffic in all seasons, and two-thirds (65%) able to take car traffic in some seasons. In one-sixth (16.8%) of the province there are no roads at all.

== See also ==
- Districts of Afghanistan
