= Islamic Emirate of Afghanistan (1996–2001) =

Afghan state

Coordinates: 34.0°N 65.8°E

Islamic Emirate of Afghanistan: د افغانستان اسلامي امارت (Pashto) Dǝ Afğānistān Islāmi Imārat; امارت اسلامی افغانستان (Dari) Imārat-i Islāmī-yi Afğānistān
- 1996–2001 (Note: Surrender date for the city, which was also when Mullah Omar went into hiding. All state institutions of the Islamic Emirate ceased functioning at this point, though some Taliban fighters remained active in Afghanistan in the following weeks, including at Tora Bora, a mountain hideout which was quickly cleared.)
- Flag Emblem
- Motto: لَا إِلهَ إِلَّا اللَّهُ، مُحَمَّدٌ رَسُولُ اللَّهِ Lā ʾilāha ʾillā llāh, Muhammadun rasūlu llāh "There is no god but God; Muhammad is the messenger of God." (Shahada)
- Anthem: دا د باتورانو کور; Dā Də Bātorāno Kor "This Is the Home of the Brave" (De facto)
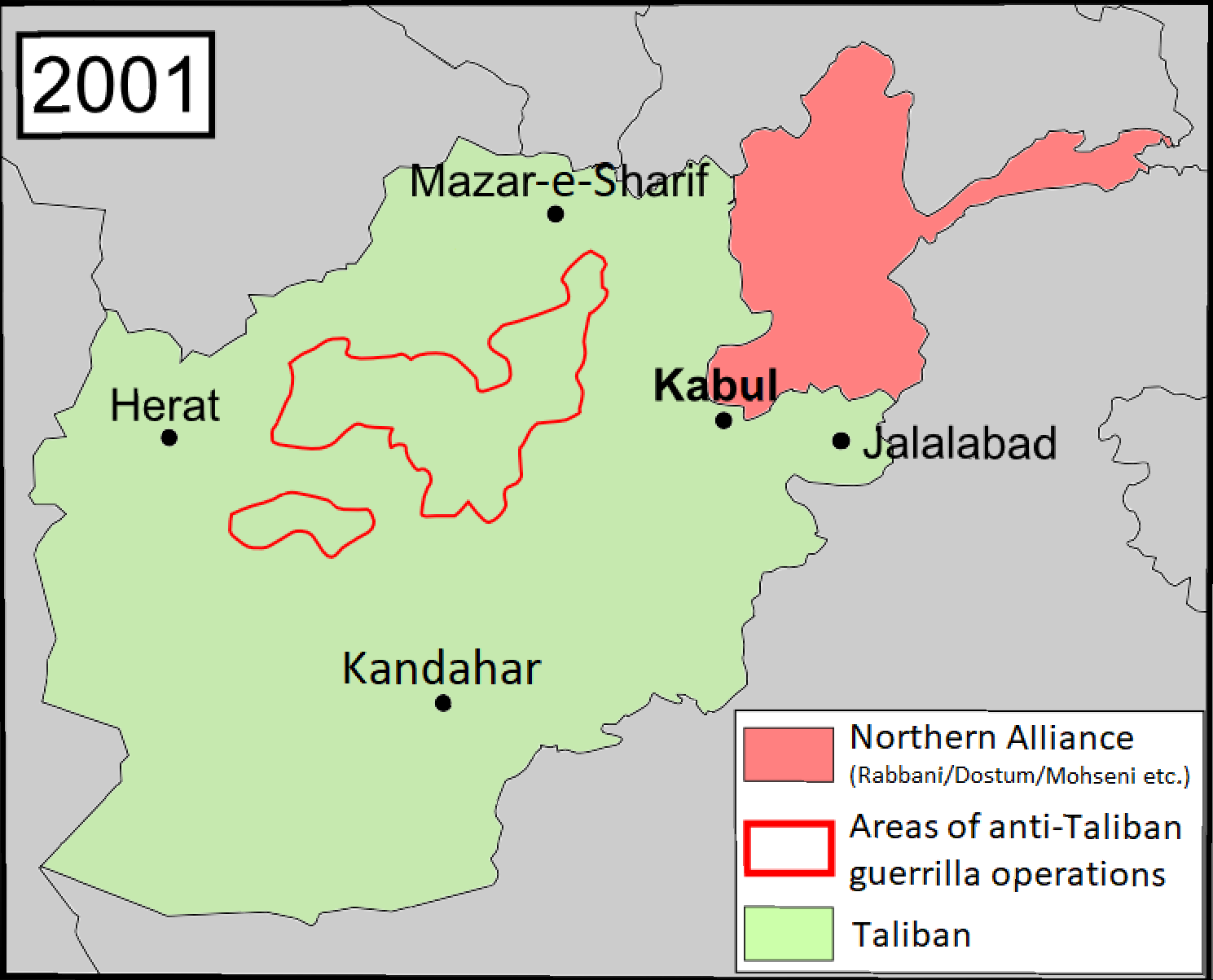
- The Islamic Emirate in 2001 (green)
- Status: Partially-recognised government (Note: The Islamic State of Afghanistan (Northern Alliance), in control of 10% of the country, retained widespread international recognition, while the Islamic Emirate of Afghanistan (Taliban), in control of 90% of the country, remained unrecognised.)
- Capital and largest city: Kabul
- Official languages: Pashto, Dari
- Religion: Islam (official)
- Demonym: Afghan
- Government: Unitary totalitarian theocratic Islamic emirate
- Supreme Leader
  - 1996–2001: Mullah Omar
- Prime Minister
  - 1996–2001: Mohammad Rabbani
  - 2001 (acting): Abdul Kabir
- Legislature: Supreme Council (consultative body)
- Historical era: Afghan conflict Afghan Civil War (1992–1996); Afghan Civil War (1996–2001); War on terror United States invasion of Afghanistan
  - Mullah Omar proclaimed Commander of the Faithful: 4 April 1996
  - Capture of Kabul: 27 September 1996
  - Name changed to "Emirate": 29 October 1997
  - Invasion begins: 7 October 2001
  - Fall of Kabul: 13 November 2001
  - Fall of Kandahar: 7 December 2001 (Note: Surrender date for the city, which was also when Mullah Omar went into hiding. All state institutions of the Islamic Emirate ceased functioning at this point, though some Taliban fighters remained active in Afghanistan in the following weeks, including at Tora Bora, a mountain hideout which was quickly cleared.)

Area
  - Total: 587,580 (Note: Afghanistan's total landmass is 652,864 km² (252,072 sq mi).; The Islamic Emirate of Afghanistan (Taliban) control 587,580 km² (226,866 sq mi) or 90%.; The Islamic State of Afghanistan (Northern Alliance) control 65,284 km² (25,206 sq mi) or 10%.) km^{2} (226,870 sq mi)
- Currency: Afghani
- Calling code: +93
- ISO 3166 code: AF
Preceded by	Succeeded by
Islamic State of Afghanistan	Islamic State of Afghanistan
- Today part of: Afghanistan

The Islamic Emirate of Afghanistan (Pashto: د افغانستان اسلامي امارت, romanized: Da Afghānistān Islāmī Imārāt), retroactively referred to as the First Islamic Emirate of Afghanistan, was a totalitarian Islamic state led by the Taliban that ruled most of Afghanistan from 1996 to 2001. At its peak, the Taliban government controlled approximately 90% of the country, while remaining regions in the northeast were held by the Northern Alliance, which maintained broad international recognition as a continuation of the Islamic State of Afghanistan. The Taliban referred to the government as interim throughout the entire period of its existence, despite the strong and permanent role of Mullah Omar in the government.

After the September 11 attacks and subsequent declaration of a "war on terror" by the United States, international opposition to the regime drastically increased, with diplomatic recognition from the United Arab Emirates and Pakistan being rescinded. The Islamic Emirate ceased to exist on 7 December 2001 after being overthrown by the Northern Alliance, which had been bolstered by the ISAF coalition established after a U.S.-led invasion of the country two months prior. The Taliban continued to refer to itself as the Islamic Emirate of Afghanistan in official communications when it was out of power from 2001 to 2021.

== History ==
=== Early history and ethnic conflict ===
The Taliban and its rule arose from the chaos after the Soviet–Afghan War. It began as an Islamic and Pashtun politico-religious movement composed of madrasa students in southern Afghanistan. Overwhelmingly ethnic Pashtuns, the Taliban blended Pashtunwali tribal code with elements of Deobandi teaching to form an anti-Western and anti-modern Islamist ideology with which it ruled. It began to receive support from neighboring Pakistan as well as from Saudi Arabia, and the United Arab Emirates. A small Taliban militia first emerged near Kandahar in the spring and summer of 1994, committing vigilante acts against minor warlords, with a fund of 250,000 USD from local businessmen. They soon began to receive backing from local Durrani Pashtun leaders.

The first major military activity of the Taliban was in October–November 1994 when they marched from Maiwand in southern Afghanistan to capture Kandahar City and the surrounding provinces, losing only a few dozen men. Starting with the capture of a border crossing and a huge ammunition dump from warlord Gulbuddin Hekmatyar, a few weeks later they freed "a convoy trying to open a trade route from Pakistan to Central Asia" from another group of warlords attempting to extort money. In the next three months this hitherto "unknown force" took control of twelve of Afghanistan's 34 provinces, with Mujahideen warlords often surrendering to them without a fight and the "heavily armed population" giving up their weapons. The Taliban initially enjoyed enormous good will from Afghans weary of the corruption, brutality, and the incessant fighting of Mujahideen warlords. However, reactions and resistance would vary and increase among non-Pashtun people.

The Taliban considered many of Afghanistan's other ethnic communities as foreign. Pashtun people are the largest ethnic group in Afghanistan and comprised the vast majority of the Taliban movement. As the Taliban expanded from their southern and south-eastern strongholds, they encountered more resistance; their brand of Deobandism, incorporated with the Pashtunwali tribal code, was viewed as foreign by the other ethnic groups of Afghanistan. The Battles of Mazar-i-Sharif illustrated this ethnic tension.

=== Rise to power and rule ===
Spreading from Kandahar, the Taliban eventually captured Kabul in 1996. By the end of 2000, the Taliban controlled 90% of the country, aside from the opposition (Northern Alliance) strongholds found primarily in the northeast corner of Badakhshan Province. Areas under the Taliban's direct control were mainly Afghanistan's major cities and highways. Tribal khans and warlords had de facto direct control over various small towns, villages, and rural areas. The Taliban sought to establish law and order and to impose a strict interpretation of Islamic Sharia law, along with the religious edicts of Mullah Omar, upon the entire country of Afghanistan.

During the five-year history of the Islamic Emirate, the Taliban regime interpreted the Sharia in accordance with the Hanafi school of Islamic jurisprudence and the religious edicts of Mullah Omar. The Taliban forbade pork and alcohol, many types of consumer technology such as most music, television, and film, as well as most forms of art such as paintings or photography, male and female participation in sport, including football and chess; recreational activities such as kite-flying and keeping pigeons or other pets were also forbidden, and the birds were killed according to the Taliban's ruling. Movie theaters were closed and repurposed as mosques. Celebration of the Western and Iranian New Year was forbidden. Taking photographs and displaying pictures or portraits was forbidden, as it was considered by the Taliban as a form of idolatry. Women were banned from working, girls were forbidden to attend schools or universities, were requested to observe purdah (physical separation of the sexes) and awrah (concealing the body with clothing), and to be accompanied outside their households by male relatives; those who violated these restrictions were punished. Men were forbidden to shave their beards and required to let them grow and keep them long according to the Taliban's liking, and to wear turbans outside their households. Communists were systematically executed. Prayer was made compulsory and those who did not respect the religious obligation after the azaan were arrested. Gambling was banned, and thieves were punished by amputating their hands or feet. In 2000, the Taliban leader Mullah Omar officially banned opium cultivation and drug trafficking in Afghanistan; the Taliban succeeded in nearly eradicating the majority of the opium production (99%) by 2001. Under the Taliban governance of Afghanistan, both drug users and dealers were severely prosecuted. The Afghan custom of bacha bazi, a form of pederastic sexual slavery and pedophilia traditionally practiced in various provinces of Afghanistan, was also forbidden under the six-year reign of the Taliban regime.

Cabinet ministers and deputies were mullahs with a "madrasah education". Several of them, such as the Minister of Health and Governor of the State bank, were primarily military commanders who were ready to leave their administrative posts to fight when needed. Military reverses that trapped them behind lines or led to their deaths increased the chaos in the national administration. At the national level, "all senior Tajik, Uzbek and Hazara bureaucrats" were replaced "with Pashtuns, whether qualified or not". Consequently, the ministries "by and large ceased to function".

Rashid described the Taliban government as "a secret society run by Kandahar is ... mysterious, secretive, and dictatorial". They did not hold elections, as their spokesman explained:

The Sharia does not allow politics or political parties. That is why we give no salaries to officials or soldiers, just food, clothes, shoes, and weapons. We want to live a life like the Prophet lived 1400 years ago, and jihad is our right. We want to recreate the time of the Prophet, and we are only carrying out what the Afghan people have wanted for the past 14 years.

They modeled their decision-making process on the Pashtun tribal council (jirga), together with what they believed to be the early Islamic model. Discussion was followed by a building of a consensus by the "believers". Before capturing Kabul, there was talk of stepping aside once a government of "good Muslims" took power, and law and order were restored.

As the Taliban's power grew, decisions were made by Mullah Omar without consulting the jirga and without consulting other parts of the country. One such instance is the rejection of Loya Jirga decision about expulsion of Osama bin Laden. Mullah Omar visited the capital, Kabul, only twice while in power. Instead of an election, their leader's legitimacy came from an oath of allegiance ("Bay'ah"), in imitation of the Prophet and the first four Caliphs. On 4 April 1996, Mullah Omar had "the Cloak of Muhammad" taken from its shrine, Kirka Sharif, for the first time in 60 years. Wrapping himself in the relic, he appeared on the roof of a building in the center of Kandahar while hundreds of Pashtun mullahs below shouted "Amir al-Mu'minin!" (Commander of the Faithful), in a pledge of support. Taliban spokesman Mullah Wakil explained:

Decisions are based on the advice of the Amir-ul Momineen. For us consultation is not necessary. We believe that this is in line with the Sharia. We abide by the Amir's view even if he alone takes this view. There will not be a head of state. Instead there will be an Amir al-Mu'minin. Mullah Omar will be the highest authority, and the government will not be able to implement any decision to which he does not agree. General elections are incompatible with Sharia and therefore we reject them.

The Taliban were very reluctant to share power, and since their ranks were overwhelmingly Pashtun they ruled as overlords over the 60% of Afghans from other ethnic groups. In local government, such as Kabul city council or Herat, Taliban loyalists, not locals, dominated, even when the Pashto-speaking Taliban could not communicate with the roughly half of the population who spoke Dari or other non-Pashtun tongues. Critics complained that this "lack of local representation in urban administration made the Taliban appear as an occupying force".

=== Fall and legacy ===
The rule of the Islamic Emirate of Afghanistan came to an end in 2001 following the United States invasion. In May and June 2003, senior Taliban officials proclaimed the Taliban regrouped and ready for guerrilla war to expel US forces from Afghanistan. In late 2004, the then-hidden Mullah Omar announced an insurgency against "America and its puppets" (i.e. transitional Afghan government forces) to "regain the sovereignty of our country". Following a long insurgency, the Taliban once again took control of Afghanistan in 2021.

== Government ==
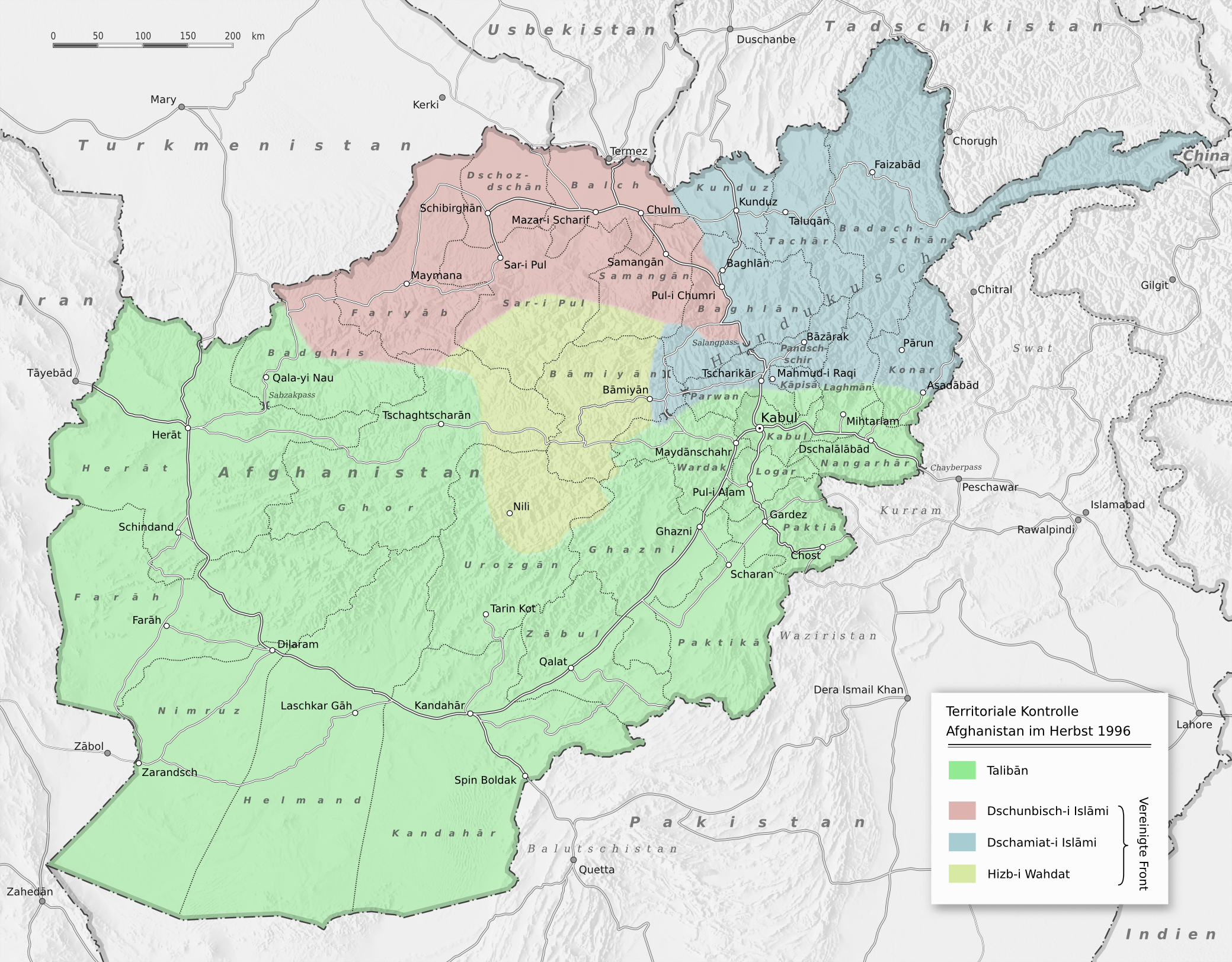
A German map showing the political status of Afghanistan in the fall of 1996, just after the Taliban conquered Kabul

The goal of the Islamic Emirate of Afghanistan during the period 1996 to 2001 was to return the order of Abdur Rahman (the Iron Emir) by the re-establishment of a state with Pashtun dominance within the northern areas. The Taliban sought to establish an Islamic government through law and order alongside a strict interpretation of Islamic law, in accordance with the Hanafi school of Islamic jurisprudence and the religious guidance of Mullah Omar, upon the entire land of Afghanistan. By 1998, the Taliban controlled 90% of Afghanistan under their interpretation of Sharia.

The Taliban modelled their decision-making process on the Pashtun tribal council (jirga), together with what they believed to be the early Islamic model. Discussion was followed by a building of a consensus by the "believers". As the group's power grew, decisions were made by Mullah Omar without consulting the jirga and without consulting other parts of the country. He visited the capital, Kabul, only twice while in power. Instead of an election, their leader's legitimacy came from an oath of allegiance ("Bay'ah"), in imitation of the Prophet and the first four Caliphs. On 4 April 1996, Mullah Omar had "the Cloak of the Prophet Mohammed" taken from its shrine for the first time in 60 years. Wrapping himself in the relic, he appeared on the roof of a building in the center of Kandahar while hundreds of Pashtun mullahs below shouted "Amir al-Mu'minin!" (Commander of the Faithful), in a pledge of support.

== Human rights in the Emirate ==
=== Role of women in the Emirate ===
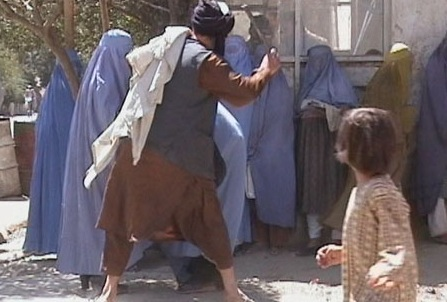
A member of the Taliban's religious police beating a woman in Kabul on 26 August 2001. The footage was filmed by RAWA.

During the Taliban's period of rule, brutal repression of women was widespread in the Emirate. Abuses were frequently and violently enforced by the religious police. For example, the Taliban issued edicts forbidding women from being educated, forcing girls to leave schools and colleges. Women leaving their houses were required to be accompanied by a male relative and were obligated to wear the burqa, a traditional dress covering the entire body except for a small slit out of which to see. Those accused of disobeying were publicly beaten. In one instance, a young woman named Sohaila was charged with adultery after walking with a man who was not a relative; she was publicly flogged in Ghazi Stadium, receiving 100 lashes. Female employment was restricted to the medical sector, where male medical personnel were prohibited from treating women and girls. This extensive ban on the employment of women further resulted in the widespread closure of primary schools, as almost all teachers prior to the Taliban's rise had been women, further restricting access to education not only to girls but also to boys. Restrictions became especially severe after the Taliban took control of the capital. In February 1998, for instance, religious police forced all women off the streets of Kabul and issued new regulations ordering people to blacken their windows so that women would not be visible from outside.

=== Ban on entertainment and recreational activities ===
During the Taliban rule of 1996–2001, they banned many recreational activities and games, such as football, kite flying, and chess. General entertainment such as televisions, cinemas, music with instrumental accompaniments, VCRs and satellite dishes were also banned. Also included in the list of banned items were "musical instruments and accessories" and all visual representation of living creatures.

It was reported that when Afghan children were caught kiting, a highly popular activity, they were beaten. When Khaled Hosseini learned through a 1999 news report that the Taliban had banned kite flying, a restriction he found particularly cruel, the news "struck a personal chord" for him, as he had grown up with the sport while living in Afghanistan. Hosseini was motivated to write a 25-page short story about two boys who fly kites in Kabul that he later developed into his first novel, The Kite Runner.

== International relations ==
Regarding its relations with the rest of the world, the Islamic Emirate of Afghanistan held a policy of isolationism: "The Taliban believe in non-interference in the affairs of other countries and similarly desire no outside interference in their country's internal affairs". Despite these isolationist policies, the Taliban entered in a deal for oil, electricity, and gas with Turkmenistan as part of the Turkmenistan–Afghanistan–Pakistan–India Pipeline.

While initially maintaining a friendly relationship, relations between the Islamic Emirate of Afghanistan and Iran deteriorated in 1998 after Taliban forces seized the Iranian consulate in Mazar-i-Sharif and executed Iranian diplomats. Following this incident, Iran threatened to invade Afghanistan by massing up military forces near the Afghan border but intervention by the United Nations Security Council and the United States prevented the war.

Turkmenistan adopted a position of "positive neutrality" and limited cooperation with the Taliban.

China first initiated contact with the Taliban in 1998. In November 2000, China's then-ambassador to Pakistan, Lu Shulin, became the first senior representative of a non-Muslim country to meet with Mullah Omar.

=== Diplomatic recognition ===
Between 1996 and 2001, only three widely recognized countries; Pakistan, Saudi Arabia, and the United Arab Emirates (UAE) declared the Islamic Emirate to be the rightful government of Afghanistan. The Islamic Emirate would also receive recognition from the partially recognized Chechen Republic of Ichkeria; though Chechen president Aslan Maskhadov would later describe the Islamic Emirate as an "illegitimate" government. The Taliban government additionally received support from Turkmenistan, though the country did not provide the Emirate with formal recognition.

The Taliban government was not recognized by the United Nations, which instead continued to recognize the Islamic State of Afghanistan as being the legitimate government of Afghanistan.

Following the declaration of a "war on terror" by the United States after the September 11 attacks by al-Qaeda in 2001, international opposition to the Taliban regime running the Islamic Emirate drastically increased, and the only remaining diplomatic recognition by Pakistan and the United Arab Emirates was rescinded under growing pressure.

=== Sanctions ===
On 15 October 1999, the UN Security Council established a sanctions regime to cover individuals and entities associated with Al-Qaeda, Osama bin Laden and/or the Taliban. Since the United States invasion of Afghanistan in 2001, the sanctions were applied to individuals and organizations in all parts of the world; also targeting former members of the Taliban government.

On 27 January 2010, a United Nations sanctions committee removed five former senior Taliban officials from this list, in a move favored by then-Afghan president Hamid Karzai. The decision meant the five would no longer be subject to an international travel ban, assets freeze and arms embargo. The five men were all high-ranking members of the Taliban government:

- Wakil Ahmad Muttawakil, former foreign minister.
- Fazal Mohammad, former deputy minister of commerce.
- Shams-us-Safa Aminzai, former Taliban foreign affairs press officer.
- Mohammad Musa Hottak, former deputy minister of planning.
- Abdul Hakim Munib, former deputy minister of frontier affairs.

All had been added to the list in January or February 2001.

=== Bamiyan Buddhas controversy ===
Destruction of Buddhas, 21 March 2001

The Buddhas of Bamiyan were two 6th-century monumental statues carved into the side of a cliff in the Bamyan valley of central Afghanistan that were destroyed in March 2001, after the Taliban government declared that they were idols. International and local opinion strongly condemned the destruction of the Buddhas.

After Battles of Mazar-i-Sharif (1997-98), the Bamyan valley came into Taliban control, and Abdul Wahed, a local Taliban commander announced his intentions to destroy the Buddhas. Initially, in July 1999, Mullah Omar decreed in favour of preserving the statues, with plans to establish a tourism circuit.

But in March 2001, the statues were destroyed by the Taliban following a decree issued by Mullah Omar. In a subsequent interview, Mullah Omar said: "I did not want to destroy the Bamiyan Buddha. In fact, some foreigners came to me and said they would like to conduct the repair work of the Bamiyan Buddha that had been slightly damaged due to rains. This shocked me. I thought, these callous people have no regard for thousands of living human beings – the Afghans who are dying of hunger, but they are so concerned about non-living objects like the Buddha. This was extremely deplorable. That is why I ordered its destruction. Had they come for humanitarian work, I would have never ordered the Buddha's destruction."

However, during another interview on 13 March 2001, the then Taliban Foreign Minister Wakil Ahmad Mutawakel stated that the destruction was not a retaliation against the economic sanctions by the international community: "We are destroying the statues in accordance with Islamic law, and it is purely a religious issue." A statement issued by the Ministry of religious affairs of the Taliban regime justified the destruction as being in accordance with Islamic law.

This prompted an international outcry from nations such as Japan, India, Sri Lanka, South Korea, Nepal, Iran, Qatar, and Russia. Even Saudi Arabia and the UAE, both of which were among only three nations to recognize the Islamic Emirate of Afghanistan, voiced their opposition. The Arab branch of UNESCO, a cultural and educational agency of the United Nations, labelled the destruction as "savage".

== Military ==
The Taliban maintained 400 Soviet-built T-54/T-55 and T-62 tanks and more than 200 armored personnel carriers. The Taliban began training its own army and commanders; some were even trained by Pakistan's Inter-Services Intelligence. Islamabad continued to support the Taliban, as Pakistani allies, in their push to conquer Afghanistan in the 1990s. The Islamic Army used child soldiers, many of them under 14 years old.

The air force under the Taliban maintained 5 MIG-21 MFs and 10 Sukhoi-22 fighter bombers. They held six Mi-8 helicopters, five Mi-35s, five Aero L-39C Albatrossess, six An-12s transport aircraft, among others. Their civil air service contained Boeing 727A/Bs, a Tu-154, five An-24s, and a DHC-6. All of these aircraft were destroyed by US forces during the war in Afghanistan in 2001. Most of the MIG-21 fleets ended up in an Afghan junkyard.

=== Conscription ===
According to the testimony of Guantanamo captives before their Combatant Status Review Tribunals, the Taliban, in addition to conscripting men to serve as soldiers, also conscripted men to staff its civil service – both done at gunpoint.

According to a report from Oxford University, the Taliban made widespread use of the conscription of children in 1997, 1998 and 1999.

== Economy ==
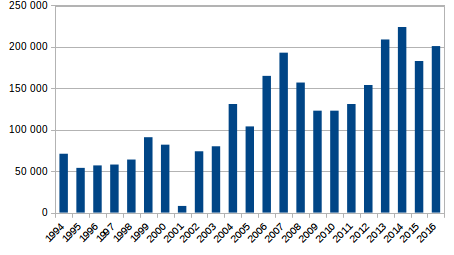
Afghanistan opium poppy cultivation, 1994–2016 (hectares). Before the US invasion of Afghanistan in 2001, opium production was almost entirely eradicated (99%) by the Taliban.

The Kabul money markets responded positively during the first weeks of the Taliban occupation. But the Afghani soon fell in value. The Taliban imposed a 50% tax on any company operating in the country, and those who failed to pay were attacked. They also imposed a 6% import tax on anything brought into the country, and by 1998 had control of the major airports and border crossings which allowed them to establish a monopoly on all trade. By 2001, the per-capita income of the 25 million population was under $200, and the country was close to total economic collapse. As of 2007, the economy had begun to recover, with estimated foreign reserves of three billion dollars and a 13% increase in economic growth.

Under the Transit treaty between Afghanistan and Pakistan a massive network for smuggling developed. It had an estimated turnover of 2.5 billion dollars with the Taliban receiving between $100 and $130 million per year. These operations along with the trade from the Golden Crescent financed the war in Afghanistan and also had the side effect of destroying start up industries in Pakistan. Ahmed Rashid also explained that the Afghan Transit Trade agreed on by Pakistan was "the largest official source of revenue for the Taliban."

Between 1996 and 1999, Mullah Omar reversed his opinions on the drug trade, apparently as it only harmed kafirs. The Taliban controlled 96% of Afghanistan's poppy fields and made opium its largest source of taxation. Taxes on opium exports became one of the mainstays of Taliban income and their war economy. According to Rashid, "drug money funded the weapons, ammunition and fuel for the war." In The New York Times, the Finance Minister of the United Front, Wahidullah Sabawoon, declared the Taliban had no annual budget but that they "appeared to spend US$300 million a year, nearly all of it on war." He added that the Taliban had come to increasingly rely on three sources of money: "poppy, the Pakistanis and bin Laden."

In an economic sense, it seems, however, he had little choice, as due to the war of attrition continuing with the Northern Alliance, the income from continued opium production was all that prevented the country from starvation. By 2000 Afghanistan accounted for an estimated 75% of the world's supply and in 2000 grew an estimated 3,276 tonnes of opium from poppy cultivation on 82,171 hectares. At this juncture Omar passed a decree banning the cultivation of opium, and production dropped to an estimated 74 metric tonnes from poppy cultivation on 1,685 hectares. Many observers say the ban – which came in a bid for international recognition at the United Nations – was only issued in order to raise opium prices and increase profit from the sale of large existing stockpiles. The year 1999 had yielded a record crop and had been followed by a lower but still large 2000 harvest. The trafficking of accumulated stocks by the Taliban continued in 2000 and 2001. In 2002, the UN mentioned the "existence of significant stocks of opiates accumulated during previous years of bumper harvests." In September 2001 – before the 11 September attacks against the United States – the Taliban allegedly authorized Afghan peasants to sow opium again.

There was also an environmental toll to the country, heavy deforestation from the illegal trade in timber with hundreds of acres of pine and cedar forests in Kunar Province and Paktya being cleared. Throughout the country millions of acres were denuded to supply timber to the Pakistani markets, with no attempt made at reforestation, which has led to significant environmental damage. By 2001, when the Afghan Interim Administration took power the country's infrastructure was in ruins, Telecommunications had failed, the road network was destroyed and Ministry of Finance buildings were in such a state of disrepair some were on the verge of collapse. On 6 July 1999 president Bill Clinton signed into effect executive order 13129. This order implemented a complete ban on any trade between the US and the Taliban regime and on 10 August they froze £5,000,000 in Ariana assets. On 19 December 2000, UN resolution 1333 was passed. It called for all assets to be frozen and for all states to close any offices belonging to the Taliban. This included the offices of Ariana Afghan Airlines. In 1999 the UN had passed resolution 1267 which had banned all international flights by Ariana apart from pre-approved humanitarian missions.

== See also ==
- History of Afghanistan (1992–present)
- Waziristan § War on terror
- Quetta Shura
- List of Taliban provincial governors
- Taliban insurgency
- War in Afghanistan (2001–2021)
- 2021 Taliban offensive

== Notes ==
Preceded by Islamic State of Afghanistan	Islamic Emirate of Afghanistan; 1996 – 2001	Succeeded by Islamic State of Afghanistan
