= Tukzar =

- Location in Afghanistan
- Coordinates: 35°58′2″N 66°26′0″E
- Country: Afghanistan
- Province: Sar-e Pol Province
- District: Sancharak

Government
  - Mayor: Modir Azam
- Elevation: 3,940 ft (1,201 m)
- Time zone: UTC+4:30

Tukzar is a town in Sancharak district of Sar-e Pol Province, Afghanistan. The town is the administrative centre of Sancharak district.

== Climate ==
Tukzar has a hot-summer humid continental climate (Köppen: Dsa) with hot summers and cool winters. In winter, there is much more rainfall in Tokzar than in summer.

July is the warmest month of the year, the temperature in July averages 24.0 °C (75.2 °F). In January, the average temperature is −0.8 °C (30.6 °F), it is the lowest average temperature of the whole year.

Climate data for Tokzar, Sar-e Pol Province
Month	Jan	Feb	Mar	Apr	May	Jun	Jul	Aug	Sep	Oct	Nov	Dec	Year
Mean daily maximum °C (°F)	5.3 (41.5)	6.9 (44.4)	13.7 (56.7)	19.2 (66.6)	24.4 (75.9)	29.1 (84.4)	30.9 (87.6)	29.7 (85.5)	25.6 (78.1)	19.9 (67.8)	12.7 (54.9)	7.6 (45.7)	18.7 (65.8)
Daily mean °C (°F)	−0.8 (30.6)	0.7 (33.3)	7.1 (44.8)	12.6 (54.7)	17.6 (63.7)	21.9 (71.4)	24.0 (75.2)	22.7 (72.9)	18.6 (65.5)	13.3 (55.9)	6.7 (44.1)	1.4 (34.5)	12.2 (53.9)
Mean daily minimum °C (°F)	−6.8 (19.8)	−5.5 (22.1)	0.4 (32.7)	6.0 (42.8)	10.8 (51.4)	14.7 (58.5)	17.0 (62.6)	15.7 (60.3)	11.5 (52.7)	6.6 (43.9)	0.7 (33.3)	−4.8 (23.4)	5.5 (42.0)
Average precipitation mm (inches)	55 (2.2)	69 (2.7)	85 (3.3)	95 (3.7)	59 (2.3)	6 (0.2)	1 (0.0)	0 (0)	2 (0.1)	15 (0.6)	43 (1.7)	42 (1.7)	472 (18.5)
Average relative humidity (%)	64	67	64	64	54	36	32	33	40	51	62	62	52
Source: Climate-Data.org

== See also ==
- Sar-e Pol Province
