= Sayyad District =

Sayyad صیاد
- District
- Location in Afghanistan
- Coordinates: 36°13′17″N 65°55′40″E
- Country: Afghanistan
- Province: Sar-e Pol
- Elevation: 1,260 m (4,130 ft)

Population
  - Religions: Islam
- Time zone: UTC+4:30

Sayyad District (Dari: صیاد) is a district of Sar-e Pol Province, Afghanistan. The estimated population in 2019 was 60,585.

== See also ==
- Districts of Afghanistan
