= Shafiqullah Mohammadi =

- Occupation: Politician
- Known for: Listed on international sanctions lists.

The Taliban appointed Maulavi Shafiqullah Mohammadi as the Governor of Khost Province in January 2000. According to the Agence France Presse his appointment represented the first time the Taliban had replaced a Governor due to his unpopularity. Residents of the Province had participated in rare public anti-Taliban demonstrations in the weeks leading up to Mohammadi's appointment, claiming the former Governor had been improperly selling off public property for personal gain.

Shafiqullah Mohammadi has been listed on various international sanctions lists.
