= Munir Bin Naseer =

Munir Naseer
- Released: 2003-11-30; Pakistan
- Citizenship: Pakistan
- Detained at: Guantanamo
- ISN: 85
- Charge: No charge (held in extrajudicial detention)
- Status: Repatriated

Munir Naseer is a citizen of Pakistan who was held in extrajudicial detention in the United States' Guantanamo Bay detention camp, in Cuba. His Guantanamo Internment Serial Number was 85.

He was repatriated on November 30, 2003.

== McClatchy News Service interview ==
On June 15, 2008, the McClatchy News Service published a series of articles based on interviews with 66 former Guantanamo captives. Munir Naseer was one of the former captives who had an article profiling him.

At the time of his interview Munir Naseer was working in a call center as a mortgage broker. According to his McClatchy interviewer, Munir Naseer chose a Dunkin' Donuts for their interview, wore American style clothes and baseball cap, and spoke English with a Chicago accent.

"With his slang, baggy cargo pants, long beard and black plastic glasses, Naseer would fit in perfectly at slacker poetry readings in New York or a skateboarders convention in Miami."

However, according to his interviewer, Munir willingly acknowledged he astonished everyone who knew him by choosing to travel to Afghanistan to engage in jihad. The interviewer reports he traveled to Afghanistan in "late 2001"—without specifying if he traveled before or after al Qaeda's attack on the USA on September 11, 2001, or whether it was before or after the USA started to retaliate in October 2001.

He described being captured near Mazar-i-Sharif when local Afghans claimed they were associated with the Taliban, and invited his group to join them for dinner, only to capture them and hand them over a local Northern Alliance leader, who shipped them to the prison at Sherberghan. He described being confined to an 8-foot (2.4 m) by 10-foot (3.0 m) cell with thirty-five other men. He described being ill with diarrhea when confined with the other men. He stated he was not beaten there, but he said guards arbitrarily removed captives and beat them, and beatings so severe they killed the captives were routine.

After two and a half months, he was transferred to the Bagram Theater Internment Facility, when he acknowledged he could speak English. He described being beaten there too. He said almost all the captives at Bagram were, like him, sold to the Americans for a bounty.

Munir Naseer described his interrogators in Guantanamo as lacking imagination, because they asked him the same questions, over and over again. His interrogators in Guantanamo weren't brutal, like his interrogators in Bagram. However, he described witnessing other captives go mad.

== Medical records ==
On March 16, 2007, the Department of Defense published height and weight records for all but ten of the captives held in Guantanamo. Munir Naseem is one of ten men whose height and weight records were withheld. The Department of Defense has not offered an explanation for why no records for those ten men were published.

== See also ==
- Bagram torture and prisoner abuse

== See also ==
- The Guantánamo Files: Website Extras (7) – From Sheberghan to Kandahar Andy Worthington
- video McClatchy News Service
