= Zia Ul Shah =

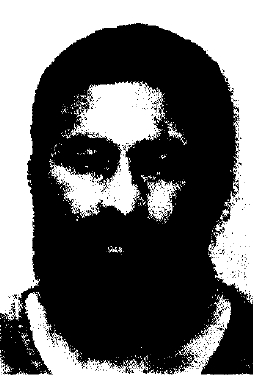
- Photo of Zia taken by CIA
- Born: 5 January 1975 (age 51); Karachi, Pakistan
- Arrested: fall 2001 outside Mazar-i-Sharif bounty hunter
- Released: October 2006; Pakistan
- Citizenship: Pakistan
- Detained at: Guantanamo
- Other names: Zia Khalid Najib; Zia Sha
- ISN: 15
- Charge: No charge
- Status: Repatriated
- Occupation: Transport driver

Zia Ul Shah (Urdu: ضیاء ال فیض; born 5 January 1975) is a Pakistani citizen best known for the time he spent in extrajudicial detention in the United States Guantanamo Bay detention camps, in Cuba. His Guantanamo Internment Serial Number was 15.

Ul Shah was a delivery driver for the Taliban in Afghanistan's Kunduz Province, who was captured in 2001. transferred to Pakistan on 11 October 2006.

== Background ==
Ul Shah travelled to Afghanistan in 2000 in search of work. The reigning Taliban government was in short supply of drivers for transport purposes and Ul Shah was hired as he owned a truck. Ul Shah was able to negotiate the terms of his contract, refusing to transport militants to fighting locations. He was instead put in charge of a route to supply a Taliban base in Kunduz, primarily delivering food.

In October 2001, Ul Shah was stopped by Northern Alliance forces led by Punjabi troop commander Qari Saleem while on his usual delivery run. According to Ul Shah, he was not immediately detained, but obliged their request to transport several surrendered Taliban fighters for them to a compound in Mazar-i-Sharif, controlled by warlord Abdul Rashid Dostum, in exchange for his freedom, which he said was a common arrangement for accosted Taliban drivers. At Dostum's camp, the Northern Alliance soldiers did not uphold their end of the deal because Ul Shah was a foreigner and that the group left Ul Shah behind as they bickered over ownership of his now-confiscated vehicle. Ul Shah was briefly sheltered and fed by an Afghan local, who kept him captive after Ul Shah told him that he was from Pakistan. Ul Shah was sold twice to other Afghans, one of whom severely beat the detainee and broke his nose, before being handed to U.S. military authorities in Kandahar on 26 November.

== Combatant Status Review ==
Ul Shah was among the 60% of prisoners who participated in the tribunal hearings. A Summary of Evidence memo was prepared for the tribunal of each detainee. The memo for his hearing lists the following allegations:

a. Detainee is a member of the Taliban.

1. Prior to September 11, 2001, detainee traveled to Afghanistan for employment and worked as a driver for the Taliban for six to eight months.
2. Detainee transported personnel and material for the Taliban, included (sic) cooking oil, ammunition, heavy coats and blankets.

b Detainee engaged in hostilities against the US or its coalition partners.

1. Detainee admits transporting Taliban members that were armed with weapons. Their mission was to search for members of the Northern Alliance.
2. Detainee was ordered to surrender to Northern Alliance forces. Detainee was instructed to drive himself and approximately 60 fighters and their Kalashnikov weapons to Mazari Sharif.

=== Administrative Review Board ===
Detainees whose Combatant Status Review Tribunal labeled them "enemy combatants" were scheduled for annual Administrative Review Board hearings. These hearings were designed to assess the threat a detainee might pose if released or transferred, and whether there were other factors that warranted his continued detention.

Shah chose to participate in his Administrative Review Board hearing.

The following factors favor continued detention

a. Commitment

1. After Eid 2000, the end of Ramadan, the detainee traveled from Karachi to Quetta, Pakistan then to Kandahar and Kabul, Afghanistan, changing buses in each city.
2. The detainee says that he had four other brothers that were also drivers for the Taliban. He claims that these are actual brothers, not just Muslim brothers.
3. The detainee transported personnel, weapons, food and supplies.
4. Additional materials the detainee transported consisted of cooking oil, bullets, heavy coats and blankets.
5. The detainee was identified as being a member of the Harakat Ul-Jihad-I-Islami.
6. The detainee admits to interacting with possible Pakistani Inter Service Intelligence Directorate (ISID) spies working for Taliban and Harakat Ul-Jihad-I-Islami forces that reported to their leader Sajjad.

b. Connections/Associations

1. Shams Afghani is a friend of the detainee who sold irons in Karachi, Pakistan and told him that Afghanistan needed drivers.
2. Shams Al Afghani is originally from the Tora Bora region and was identified as being in charge of military operations and various fighters located in the valley of the Tora Bora region.
3. The detainee stated that while employed as a driver with the Taliban, he received his pay from either Kari Saleem or Mugheera Bhai.
4. Quari Saleem is the head of a madrassa used by Harakat Ul-Jihad-I-Islammi member Sajjad, who would frequently attend and hold meetings at the madrassa.
5. Sajjad is a member of the Taliban and a team leader in the Harakat Ul-Jihad-I-Islami. Sajjad held regular meetings in Qari Saleem's madrassa with about twenty or thirty people from the Harakat Ul-Jihad-I-Islami.
6. The Harakat Ul-Jihad-I-Islami is a Sunni extremist group founded to fight in the jihad against the Soviets. It's made up primarily of Pakistanis and foreign Islamists.
7. The Lashkar-e Tayibais the armed wing of the Pakistan-based organization, Markaz-ud-Dawa-wal-irshad, an anti-U.S. missionary organization formed in 1989. It was added to the U.S. Treasury Department's Officer of Foreign Asset Control's List, which included organizations that are believed to support terrorist groups.
8. The detainee admits to hearing about Baba Shams, a local administrator of the Taliban.
9. The detainee provided additional information regarding other senior Taliban leaders. He described Juma Bahai, an Uzbek and the leader of the Taliban in Khawajghar. Juma was in charge of all Arabs and foreigners such as Pakistanis and Afghanis

c. Other Relevant Data

1. Two of the detainee's superiors were Qari Saleem and Mugheera Bhai.
2. Qari Saleem was commander of the Punjabi troops in the Konduz region. He coordinated troops and supply movements from the school to forward areas in Tangi Tehsil, Bangi Taqar and Khawajaghaar. He also controlled all finances for the operation.
3. The Taliban forces used a school in Konduz as a headquarters and transition point for troops deployed in the Konduz region. Recruits, weapons, ammunition and food supplies were delivered from the school to forward areas north and east of Konduz.
4. The detainee surrendered to the Northern Alliance in Konduz on the tenth day of Ramadan. He drove his truck to Mazari Sharif to surrender.
5. The detainee escaped his captors shortly after surrendering and hid in a warehouse in some nearby woods until he was recaptured.
6. Besides the Harakat Ul-Jihad-I-Islam, the detainee was able to identify other Islamic groups known to him, the Jaish-e Muhammed Harakat-Ul-Mujahedin and Lashkar-e-Tayyiba.
7. The Harakat ul Mujahidin is a Pakistan-based Islamic militant organization.

The following primary factors favor release or transfer

a. The detainee claims he was never introduced to anyone higher than Qari Saleem.

b. The detainee denied ever receiving training from the Taliban and he claims he was not aware of any training camps for Taliban or al Qaida fighter nearby

c. The detainee states he has never met Usama Bin Laden and doesn't know where he's located.

=== Formerly secret Joint Task Force Guantanamo assessment ===
On 25 April 2011, whistleblower organization WikiLeaks published formerly secret assessments drafted by Joint Task Force Guantanamo analysts. His 5 page Joint Task Force Guantanamo assessment was drafted on. It was signed by camp commandant Brigadier General Jay W. Hood. He recommended transfer to another country for continued detention. The assessment noted an earlier assessment had recommended release or transfer, but that new information escalated concern.

== McClatchy News Service interview ==
On 15 June 2008, the McClatchy News Service published a series of articles based on interviews with 66 former Guantanamo captives. Zia Khalid Najib was one of the former captives who had an article profiling him.

The McClatchy article quoted Abdul Jabar Sabit, the Attorney General of Afghanistan, who visited Guantanamo and had interview Zia Khalid Najib. The Attorney General commented on how the USA seemed to base its release decisions on how compliant captives were, while in custody. He noted that the USA had released senior Taliban leaders who complied with the camp rules, while continuing to hold low-level foot-soldiers, or innocent victims of mistaken identity, who did not comply.

This division did not have anything to do with the crimes attributed to them. Only their behavior in the prison was taken into account.

Zia Khalid Najib acknowledged that he had poor impulse control, and was routinely being punished by the guards provocations and Koran desecration:

They would say they were taking me to isolation for three days, and then leave me there for three months. Then they would bring me back to a cell, and three or four days later take me back to isolation ... I would say, and this is a guess, I spent 15 days a month in isolation.

Zia Khalid Najib told his McClatchy interviewers that his first interrogators asked him about serving as one of Osama bin Laden's drivers—an allegation he denied. He confirmed he had driven low level Taliban fighters, but he had never driven anyone from Al Qaeda. He said that interrogators stopped asking him about driving Bin Laden, but that many of his later interrogation sessions consisted largely of personality clashes:

The interrogators spent entire sessions asking me why I was staring at them and yelling at me that I should look at the floor.

The McClatchy article noted that among the justifications for Zia Khalid Najib's continued detention was that he knew senior Taliban members, and his rebuttal. He attributed these allegations to incompetent translation.

When they asked me if I know of them or did you hear about them I said yes ... these people have big banners hanging all over Karachi and in Pakistan. Of course I heard of them.
