= Zangabad, Afghanistan =

Village in Kandahar Province, Afghanistan

Zangabad
- Location in Afghanistan
- Coordinates: 31°28′N 65°22′E
- Country: Afghanistan
- Province: Kandahar Province
- District: Panjwayi District
- Elevation: 3,002 ft (915 m)
- Time zone: UTC+4:30

Zangabad (Pashto: زنګاباد) or Zangiabad (زنګي اباد) is a village in the Panjwayi District of Kandahar Province, Afghanistan.

== Geography ==
Zangabad is 915 meters above sea level. An earthquake with a strength of four to five according to Richter occurs on average every 50 years. Periods of extreme drought are very common.

== See also ==
- Kandahar Province
