= Aminullah Amin =

Pakistani detainee

- Born: Chaman, Pakistan
- Detained at: Guantanamo
- Other name: Aminulla Amin
- ISN: 504
- Charge: No charge (extrajudicial detention)
- Status: Released

Aminullah Amin was held in extrajudicial detention in the United States Guantanamo Bay detention camps, in Cuba. His Guantanamo Internment Serial Number was 504.

Aminulla Amin was transferred to Pakistan on 17 September 2004.

== Capture ==
Aminulla Amin's capture was reported on 20 December 2001. He was captured by Pakistani officials.

== Role in the Taliban ==
The BBC called his capture the first of a senior Taliban official, and said he had been "...the border security chief for the southern half of the frontier."

In United Nations Security Council Resolution 1267, Aminullah Amin was listed as Governor of Saripul Province, the 110th individual listed on a list of 400 individuals under sanctions from 1999.

== Guantanamo detention ==
Joint Task Force Guantanamo (JTF-GTMO) counter-terrorism analysts report that he was born in Chaman, Pakistan, and is a citizen of Pakistan. JTF-GTMO analysts provided a date of birth or an estimated year of birth for almost all the captives. Aminullah Amin is one of the few captives whose age they did not speculate on. They spelled his name as Aminulla Amin.

While Aminulla Amin was listed 759 men and boys on the "List of Individuals Detained by the Department of Defense at Guantanamo Bay, Cuba from January 2002 through 15 May 2006", he was not listed among the 558 men and boys on the "List of detainee who went through complete CSRT process".

As a consequence of Rasul v. Bush all 558 captives who remained in Guantanamo as of the fall of 2004 had a Combatant Status Review Tribunal. There is no record of where Aminullah Amin has been transferred.

The chronological list of captives' dates of departure from Guantanamo lists his date as of release as 17 September 2004—two months after the Combatant Status Review Tribunals had begun.

== Literary works ==
- Amin, Muhammad Aminullah (2010). لشکر دجّال کى راه ميں رکاوٹ [The barrier in the way of the Dajjal's army] (in Urdu). OCLC 825050246.
