= Sar-e-Pol Province =

Province of Afghanistan

Sar-e Pol سرپل
- Province
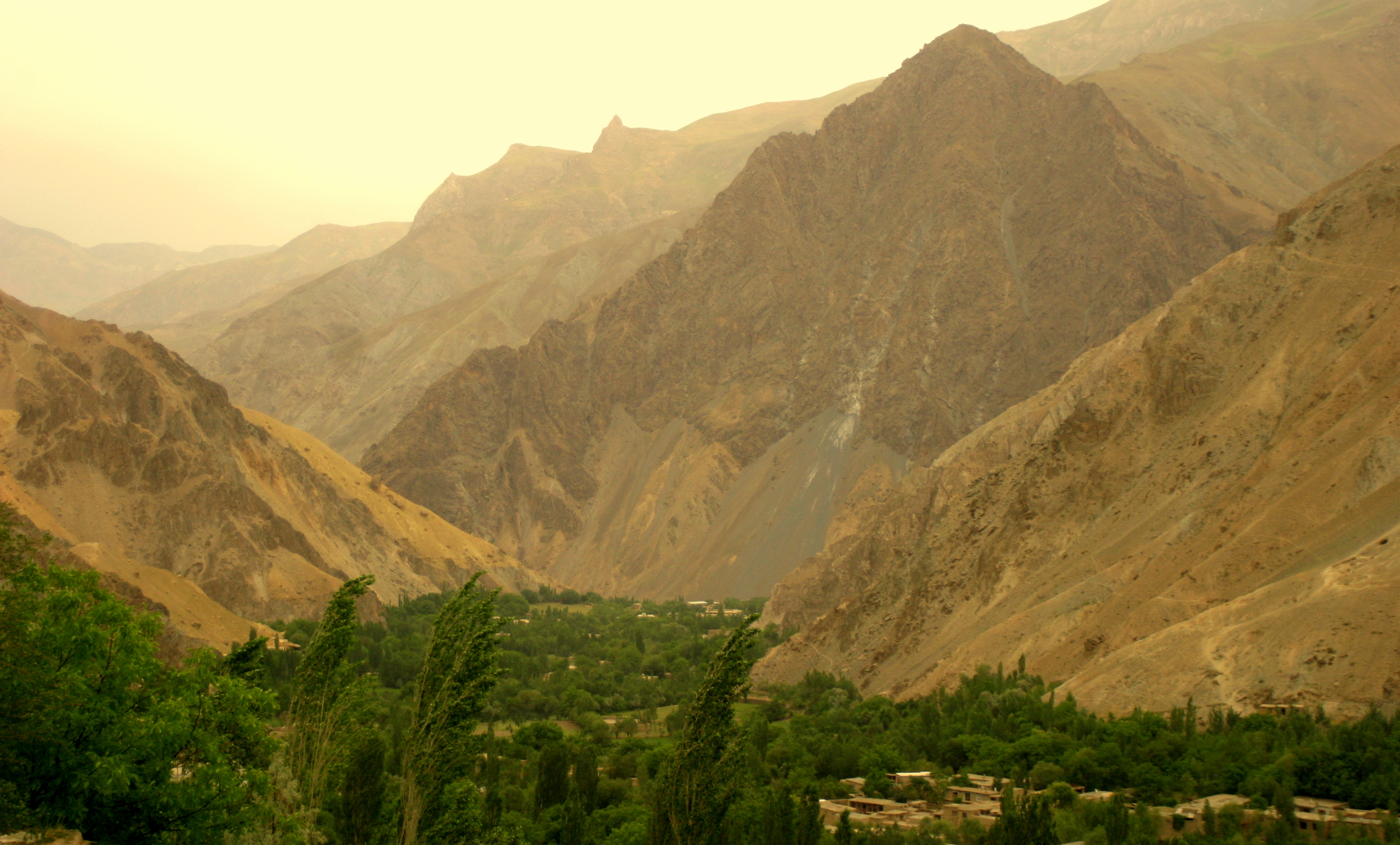
- Balkhab District

- Map of Afghanistan with Sar-e Pol highlighted
- Coordinates (Capital): 35.6°N 66.3°E
- Country: Afghanistan
- District: Sar-e-Pol
- Capital: Sar-e-Pol

Government
  - Governor: Abdul Rahman
  - Deputy Governor: Mohammad Nader

Area
  - Total: 16,360 km^{2} (6,320 sq mi)

Population (2021)
  - Total: 632,182
  - Density: 38.64/km^{2} (100.1/sq mi)
- Time zone: UTC+4:30 (Afghanistan Time)
- Postal code: 21xx
- ISO 3166 code: AF-SAR
- Main languages: Dari, Uzbek, Pashto and Turkmen

Sar-e-Pol (Pashto (Note: Pashto pronunciation: [sa'ri.pul]), Dari (Note: Dari pronunciation: [sä.ɾɪ.pʰʊl]): سر پل; lit. 'bridge head'), also spelled Sari Pul, is one of the 34 provinces of Afghanistan, located in the north of the country. It borders Ghor and Bamyan to the south, Samangan to the east, Balkh and Jowzjan to the north, and Faryab to the west. The province is divided into 7 districts and contains 896 villages. It has a population of about 632,000, which is multi-ethnic and mostly a tribal society. The province was created in 1988 with the support of northern Afghan politician Sayed Nasim Mihanparast. The city of Sar-e-Pol serves as the provincial capital.

== History ==
Between the early 16th and the mid-18th century, the territory was ruled by the Khanate of Bukhara. It was given to Ahmad Shah Durrani by Murad Beg of Bukhara after a treaty was signed in about 1750 and became part of the Durrani Empire. It was ruled by the Durranis, followed by the Barakzai dynasty. The area was untouched by the British during the three Anglo-Afghan wars fought in the 19th and 20th centuries. It remained peaceful for about one hundred years until the 1980s Soviet–Afghan War.

=== Recent history ===
During the Afghan Civil War, the area was controlled by forces loyal to Abdul Rashid Dostum. It was captured by the Taliban in 1998. Aminullah Amin, the first senior member of the Taliban to be captured, was the former governor of the province.

Swedish-led Provincial Reconstruction Team (PRT), which has been based in Mazar-e Sharif since about 2005 and responsible for four provinces including Sar-e Pol, established an office and some troops in the province. The Afghan National Security Forces (ANFS) began expanding in the last decade and slowly took over security from the International Security Assistance Force (ISAF). The Afghanistan-Turkmenistan border is maintained by the Afghan Border Police (ABP), while law and order for the rest of the province is provided by the NATO-trained Afghan National Police (ANP).

In 2009, the provincial Police Chief stated that weapons had been collected from many people and three districts, namely, Sangcharak, Gosfandi, and Sozama Qala areas, termed as the peaceful districts of the province. In operations against militants, the police chief said they had arrested a prominent Taliban commander, Mullah Nader, along with 11 other people during the recent operations. He said scores of kilograms of hashish and opium had also been seized from people during the operations.

The biggest threat to travelers in Sar-e Pol province remains highway bandits and thieves, corrupt militiamen and police, and road hazards. During the American-Afghan war, small groups of cadres were active throughout the province. These groups often relied on larger support networks in neighboring provinces.

On August 8, 2021, the Taliban regained control of the provincial capital.

== Geography ==
Sar-e Pol is a mountainous province, especially in its southern region. The province covers an area of 16,360 km. Three-quarters (75%) of the province is mountainous or semi-mountainous terrain, while one-seventh (14%) of the area is made up of flat land. The province is divided into 7 districts, containing 896 villages.

== Administrative divisions ==
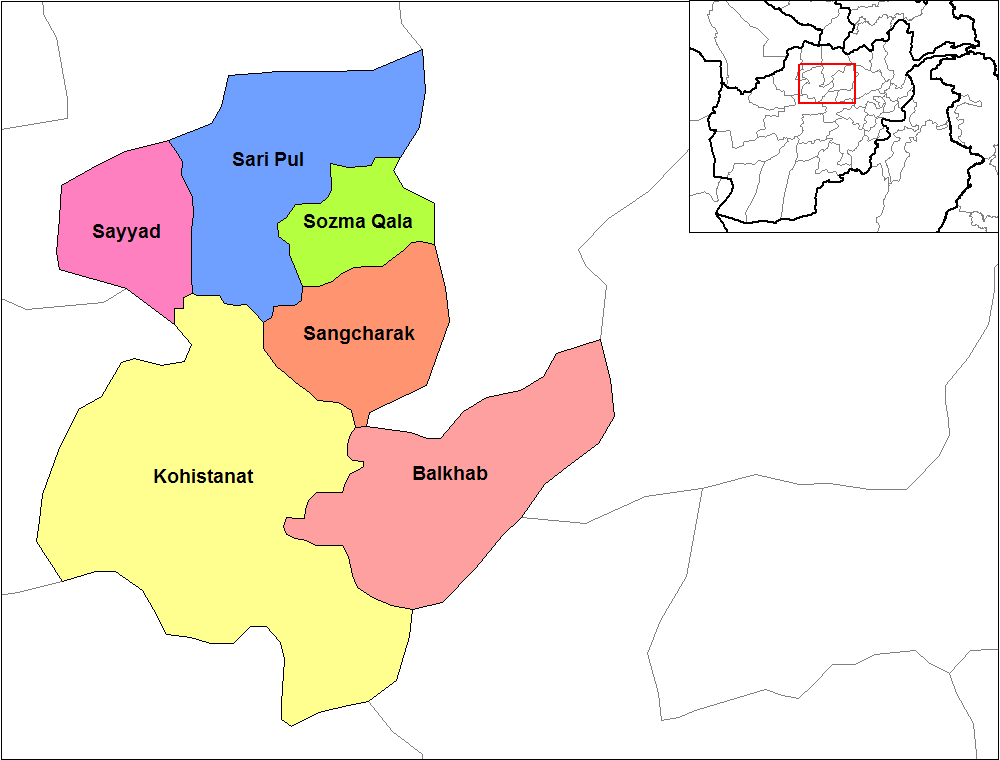
Map of the districts of Sar-e-Pol as of January 2004, prior to the redrawing of provincial and district boundaries later that year

Districts of Sar-e-Pol Province
District	Capital	Population	Area	Pop. density	Demographics
Balkhab		56,864	2,958	19	Predominantly Hazaras, few Pashtuns.
Gosfandi		64,038	620	103	Majority Hazaras, minority Uzbeks. Used to belong to Sancharak District.
Kohistanat		90,477	5,771	16	Mixed Uzbeks, Pashtuns, Hazaras.
Sancharak		115,050	1,316	87	Majority Hazaras, minority Uzbeks, few Kyrgyz.
Sar-e-Pol	Sar-e-Pol	176,994	2,442	72	Majority Uzbeks, minority Pashtuns.
Sayyad		61,646	1,334	46	Predominantely Uzbeks, few Pashtuns.
Sozma Qala		55,933	531	105	Majority Hazara, Minority Pashtun
Sar-e Pol		621,002	16,386	38	43.3% Uzbeks, 38.6% Hazaras, 18.1% Pashtuns, 0.2% Kyrgyz. (Note: Note: "Predominantely" or "dominated" is interpreted as 99%, "majority" as 70%, "mixed" as 1/(number of ethnicities), "minority" as 30% and "few" or "some" as 1%.)

== Economy ==
Mining and agriculture are the province's main industries. The Government of Afghanistan signed a deal with China National Petroleum Corporation (CNPC) for the development of oil blocks in the Amu Darya basin, a project expected to earn billions of dollars over two decades; the deal covers drilling and a refinery in the northern provinces of Sar-e Pol and Faryab and is the first international oil production agreement entered into by the Afghan government for several decades. Production of Afghan oil began in October 2012, and it was expected to increase to 1 million barrels per year in 2013.

On October 5, 2018, in Washington, D.C., Afghan officials signed a 30-year contract involving a $56 million investment by investment group Centar and its operating company Afghan Gold and Minerals Co. for exploration of an area covering 500 square km for copper, with development of mining due to begin thereafter.

Communications in and around the province are provided by Afghan Wireless, Roshan, Etisalat, and MTN Group.

== Demography ==
=== Population ===
As of 2021, the total population of the province was approximately 632,000.

=== Ethnicity, languages and religion ===
Estimated ethnolinguistic and -religious composition
Ethnicity	Uzbek	Pashtun	Tajik/ Farsiwan	Hazara	Arab	Aimaq	Others	Sources
Period	Uzbek	Pashtun	Tajik/ Farsiwan	Hazara	Arab	Aimaq	Others	Sources

2021– (Islamic Emirate)	60%	∅	–	∅	∅	∅	∅
2024 UNHCR	60%	∅	–	∅	∅	∅	∅ (Note: incl. Baloch.)

2004–2021 (Islamic Republic)	1st	2nd – ≥5th	2nd – 5th	3rd	≥4th	≥4th	∅
2020 EU	1st	–	–	–	–	–	–
2018 UN	major	∅	major	major	∅	∅	∅
2015 CP	1st	2nd	5th	3rd	4th	–	–
2015 NPS	majority	significant (Note: excl. Kuchi.)	minority	significant	minority	–	∅ (Note: incl. Sayyid.)
2011 PRT	majority	significant	minority	significant	minority	–	–
2011 USA	∅	∅	∅	∅	–	–	–
2007 UN	31%	∅	25%	22%	∅	11%	–

Legend:
- ∅: Ethnicity mentioned in source but not quantified
- –: Ethnicity not mentioned specifically
- Source abbreviations: Empirical sources: –, Government sources: CP – Colombo Plan, EU – European Union Agency for Asylum, PRT – Provincial Reconstruction Team of the United States government, UN – United Nations Assistance Mission in Afghanistan, UNHCR – United Nations High Commissioner for Refugees, Editorial sources: NPS – Naval Postgraduate School, USA – United States Army

=== Education ===
The overall literacy rate (6+ years of age) increased from 12% in 2005 to 23% in 2011. The overall net enrolment rate (6–13 years of age) increased from 22% in 2005 to 46% in 2011.

=== Health ===
The percentage of households with clean drinking water increased from 8% in 2005 to 15% in 2011. The rate of births attended to by a skilled birth attendant increased from 0% in 2005 to 20% in 2011.

== See also ==
- Sar-e Pol city
- Sar-e Pol District
