= Ejaz Ahmad Khan =

Pakistani Guantanamo detainee

- Detained at: Guantanamo
- Other name: Ijaz Khan
- ISN: 135
- Status: Repatriated on 11 November 2003

Ejaz Ahmad Khan is a citizen of Pakistan who was held in extrajudicial detention in the United States's Guantanamo Bay detention camps, in Cuba.

He was repatriated on 11 November 2003.

== McClatchy News Service interview ==
On 15 June 2008, the McClatchy News Service published a series of articles based on interviews with 66 former Guantanamo captives. Khan was one of three former captives who had an article profiling him.

Khan described being held in a crowded shipping container by General Dostum in Sherberghan, where many other captives died. He acknowledged to the McClatchy interviewer that he traveled from Pakistan to Afghanistan to fight US forces. He was detained by Pakistani security officials for ten months after his repatriation.

According to the McClatchy article he was one of many fighters who surrendered to General Dostum's forces in November 2001. He described brutal beatings while both in Dostum's custody and in American custody in Afghanistan. He described personally seeing Koran desecration.

Khan reported that he had great difficulty coping with his detention. He reported he was experiencing difficulty coping with his release, and frequently lost his temper.
