= Wakil Ahmed Muttawakil =

Afghan politician

Mullah Wakil Ahmad Muttawakil
- وکیل احمد متوکل

Foreign Minister of Afghanistan
- In office 27 October 1999 – October 2001
- Preceded by: Mohammad Hasan Akhund

Personal details
- Born: 1971 (age 54–55) Maiwand District, Kandahar Province, Kingdom of Afghanistan
- Party: Taliban
- Occupation: Politician, Taliban member (until October 21, 2003)

Wakil Ahmad Muttawakil Abdul Ghaffar (born 1971) is an Afghan politician who has been a member of the militant Taliban organization. He was the Taliban foreign minister from 27 October 1999 in their first Islamic Emirate of Afghanistan rule, until the Taliban were deposed in late 2001. Prior to this, he served as spokesman and secretary to Mullah Mohammed Omar, leader of the Taliban. After the Northern Alliance, accompanied by U.S. and British forces, ousted the regime, Muttawakil surrendered in Kandahar to government troops.

In 2005, he announced that he would be a candidate in the elections for the House of the People.

== Early life ==
Muttawakil is originally from Keshkinakhud in Maywand District, Kandahar Province. He is not known for being a mujahed in the 1980s Soviet invasion, but his father, Abdul Ghafar Barialai, is an extremely famous Pashto poet in southern Afghanistan and was killed during Taraki's rule. He belongs to the Kakar tribe.

== Taliban ==
In the early period of the Taliban movement, Muttawakil, who had been a madrasa student under Mohammed Omar, served as Omar's companion, driver, food taster, translator and secretary. He progressed to being his official spokesman, communicating with the press, foreign diplomats and aid agencies. He was appointed foreign minister on 27 October 1999, replacing Mohammad Hasan Akhund, and remained in that position until the Taliban were deposed in late 2001.

According to the BBC, in July 2001 Muttawakil was told by Tohir Yo'ldosh, leader of the Islamic Movement of Uzbekistan, that al-Qaeda was planning to launch a huge attack within the United States. Muttawakil was worried that this would lead to the American military retaliating against Afghanistan. He sent an envoy to meet a US diplomat in Peshawar, Pakistan, to warn of the plan and to urge the US to launch a military attack on al-Qaeda in Afghanistan, but US officials were skeptical about the information. The aide also warned United Nations officials. Al-Qaeda used hijacked airliners to attack the United States on September 11, 2001.

== Defection from the Taliban ==
In October 2001, the month following al Qaeda's attacks in the USA, Muttawakil was reported to be in Pakistan. According to the BBC, some rumors said he was trying to negotiate an end to the American aerial bombardment of Afghanistan and suggesting the Taliban hand over Bin Laden. Muttawakil was reported to have had a 90-minute meeting with Lieutenant General Ehsan ul Haq, the head of Pakistan's Inter-Services Intelligence Directorate. He was rumored to have asked General Haq to lobby United States Secretary of State Colin Powell, that an American ceasefire would allow moderate elements within the Taliban, like Muttawakil, to push Taliban leader Mullah Mohammed Omar to abandon Bin Laden.

On October 15, 2001, it was reported that Muttawakil had arrived in the United Arab Emirates in order to defect from the Taliban. UAE officials denied this report. The BBC confirmed that Muttawakil had surrendered, after two weeks of negotiation, in early February 2002. Abdullah Abdullah, the minister who held the same portfolio in Hamid Karzai's Afghan Transitional Authority as Muttawakil had held under the Taliban, stated that Muttawakil should stand trial for war crimes.

== Detention ==
Fazal Mohammad, detained on suspicion of being a former Taliban commander, was released from American custody for medical reasons in mid-2002. He reported that he had been held in American custody in Kandahar with about 300 other captives, including Wakil Ahmed Muttawakil, and two of his former deputies, Khirullah Khairkhwa, and Abdul Hai Mutmaen. He reported that they were fed starvation rations, their wounds were left untreated, and that captives were subjected to sexual abuse, and attacks from dogs.

The BBC reported on October 8, 2003 that Muttawakil had recently been released from eighteen months of detention in Bagram, and had returned to his family's home in Kandahar. Muttawakil is reported to have said:

I'm good, the police provide security for me, some police forces are guarding my house.

On July 4, 2005, the BBC reported that Muttawakil spent the three years after his surrender in US detention and under Afghan house arrest. Following the end of his house arrest Muttawakil took positions at odds with those of the former Taliban regime. He said he no longer opposed female education, so long as it was consistent with Afghan culture. And he said that supporting Osama bin Laden and al Qaeda had brought suffering to Afghanistan. But he still defended some other aspects of the Taliban's former policies.

== Disowned by the Taliban ==
On October 21, 2003, the Taliban disowned Muttawakil. The BBC was told by a Taliban spokesman that Muttawakil "does not represent our will".

In 2003, Muttawakil's location and status was a matter for speculation. The BBC reported that he had been released from detention from the United States Bagram Theater Detention Facility.

The BBC also reported that the US was guarding him, for his own protection, at their base in Kandahar. It reported that aides to Muttawakil had asserted that the USA had given Muttawakil two choices: join the Karzai government as a spokesman and adviser to the Afghan president; or seek political asylum in a Western country. However, the aides said, Muttawakil wanted to take a break from involvement in Afghan politics, and, if he were to seek asylum, he would wish to do so in an Arab country.

== Present ==
Muttawakil ran for parliamentary elections in September 2005.

W.A. Muttawakil's brother Maulvi Jalil Ahmed was for six years a cleric in the city of Quetta, Pakistan. He was killed in a shooting incident in Quetta in July 2005.

=== Move to Kabul ===
An article in the German publication Der Spiegel, on April 12, 2007, about the Taliban's former ambassador to Pakistan, Abdul Salam Zaeef, said he had moved into a "... handsome guest house, located in the dusty modern neighborhood Khosh Hal Khan." The article goes on to state that the new home Karzai's government has provided Zaeef is around the corner from Muttawakil's. Der Spiegel described Zaeef's home as being guarded, inside and out, by a heavily armed security detail. Like Muttawakil, Zaeef is regarded as one of the more moderate former members of the Taliban.

== Saudi peace talks ==
During Ramadan in 2008, there were rumors that Saudi King Abdullah was attempting to broker peace talks between the warring parties from Afghanistan. Muttawakil, former Taliban Ambassador to Pakistan Abdul Salem Zaeef and former Supreme Court Chief Justice Fazel Hadi Shinwari were among leading Afghan figures who met with King Abdullah.

Zaeef acknowledged being invited by Abdullah to dine with other leading Afghan figures, from the Karzai government, the Taliban, Gulbuddin Hekmatyar's Hezb-e-Islami and other former members of the Taliban. Zaeef denied this meeting should be characterized as "peace talks". He stated that none of the individuals at this meeting had been authorized to conduct negotiations. Zaeef denied anyone discussed Afghanistan at this meeting.

== Sanctions ==
In 1999, the UN Security Council established a sanctions regime to cover individuals and entities associated with Al-Qaida, Osama bin Laden and/or the Taliban. Since the US Invasion of Afghanistan in 2001, the sanctions were applied to individuals and organizations in all parts of the world, also targeting former members of the Taliban government. Muttawakil was added to this list in 2001.

On January 27, 2010, a United Nations sanctions committee removed him and four other former senior Taliban officials from this list, in a move favoured by Afghan President Karzai. The decision meant he and the four others would no longer be subject to an international travel ban, assets freeze and arms embargo.

== See also ==
- Disarmed Enemy Forces
- Civilian Internee
