= Fazal Mohammad =

Mullah Fazal Mohammad is a citizen of Afghanistan and formerly a Taliban militia commander who was captured on November 25, 2001.

According to the Australian Broadcasting Corporation (ABC), he was the Taliban militia's "commander in Afghanistan's southern region along the Pakistan border" in 2001. He was one of the speakers who addressed an outdoor rally in support of the Taliban on November 9, 2001.

According to the Pakistani newspaper Dawn, Fazal Mohammed was captured in the Taliban office in Soldier Bazaar, Karachi, where officials seized nineteen other individuals, "relief goods, documents, and aid money".

The ABC reported on July 28, 2002 that 30-year-old Fazal Mohammed was released from a US prison near Kandahar due to failing health. A Pakistani doctor who examined him said he had lost most of his vision. Fazal Mohammad claimed that he and other captives in Kandahar were subjected to sexual abuse and ferocious dogs. Their wounds and other medical conditions were reportedly left untreated, and they were fed starvation rations. Fazal Mohammad reported that at the time the Kandahar prison had held approximately 300 other inmates, including former Taliban Foreign Minister Wakil Ahmed Mutawakil, his spokesman Abdul Hai Mutmaen, and former Herat governor Maulawi Khairullah Khairkhawa.
