= Mohammed Saghir =

Pakistani Guantanamo detainee

- Born: 1952 (age 73–74); Kohistan
- Detained at: Guantanamo
- Other name: Mohammad Sanghir
- ISN: 143
- Status: Repatriated in October 2002.

Mohammed Saghir (also transliterated Mohammed Sanghir) is an elderly Pakistani who was held by the U.S. military in the United States Guantanamo Bay detention camps, in Cuba. His Guantanamo Internment Serial Number was 143. Joint Task Force Guantanamo counter-terrorism analysts estimate he was born in 1952, in Kohistan District, Pakistan.

When The Guardian interviewed Saghir, following his release, on 22 October 2002, they estimated he was in his sixties.

Saghir was one of the first four detainees to be released from Guantanamo. He was the first Pakistani to be released from Guantanamo.

Saghir was released together with two even more elderly Afghan men, and one younger Afghan man.

== Guantanamo documents ==
No documents about Mr. Saghir had been made public, as he was released before the Combatant Status Review Tribunals began.

On 25 April 2011, whistleblower organisation WikiLeaks published formerly secret assessments drafted by Joint Task Force Guantanamo analysts. Saghir's assessment was dated 27 September 2002, and was two pages long. His assessment was signed by camp commandant Michael E. Dunlavey who recommended release or transfer to the control of another country. Historian Andy Worthington, author of The Guantanamo Files, repeated the justification for Saghir's detention -- "his knowledge of General Dostum's treatment of captured personnel transported from Kunduz to Sheberghan". Worthington called it "...a low point in the feeble reasons given for transfer to Guantánamo, as it involved US forces suggesting that they took him halfway round the world to an experimental prison outside the law simply to find out more about how their close ally had been murdering prisoners of war."

== Suing the USA ==
Saghir initiated a lawsuit against the United States for $10.4 million for the torture and abuse he reports he endured. Saghir says that when he was released he was promised compensation.

In September 2012, Saghir reminded The Express Tribune that President Barack Obama had broken his promise to close Guantanamo.

== Le Monde interview ==
Saghir reportedly still wears the green ID bracelet issued to him in camp delta. His bracelet says: US 9PK 0001 43 DP

According to Le Monde, Mohammed Saghir said he had been in Afghanistan for three months prior to the al Qaeda attacks of 11 September 2001. He was Captured in Kunduz, a Taliban enclave in the North of Afghanistan, with 250 other people, who were loaded into a large shipping container, for the trip to General Dostum's prison at Sheberghan: Saghir said 50 of his companions died:

They were screaming for water, they were banging their heads against the walls and there, right there beside me, they died.

Mohammed Saghir said he was held for 45 days in Sheberghan before he was first interrogated. After several months in Afghanistan, where he was forcibly shaved, Saghir said a female interrogator told him he was being sent to a better place. However, he reported, while still bound, he and his companions were thrown off the plane that took them to Guantanamo, and endured a brutal beating.

Mohammed Saghir said he was interrogated twenty times while at Guantanamo:

The questions were always the same, just presented in different ways. First, they showed me photographs of members of al-Qai'da to find out if I knew them; then they asked me if there were any al-Qai'da members around me; they wanted to know if I'd met bin Laden and if I'd be able to recognise him. The photos were of people who looked like Afghans or Arabs.

== McClatchy News Service interview ==
On 15 June 2008, the McClatchy News Service published a series of articles based on interviews with 66 former Guantanamo captives. Saghir was one of the former captives who had an article profiling him.

Saghir reports that when he was repatriated he found that his family had incurred debts of 1.2 million rupees in his absence—to search for his body, and to support themselves without his income.

He acknowledged that he had traveled to Afghanistan with a group from the Tablighi Jamaat, a non-political religious organization that American counter-terrorism analysts tie to terrorism.

Mohammed Saghir told his McClatchy interviewer that he was captured in a stream of refugees, not on a battlefield. He said he was shipped in a metal shipping container to General Dostum's Sherberghan prison. He said he saw many other captives die during the months he spent there. He describe religious persecution in Guantanamo. He participated in a hunger strike and was subjected to force-feeding.

== Pakistan Observer interview ==
The Pakistan Observer published a new interview with Saghir on 8 March 2012. According to the article he asserted "No one among the prisoners knew as to who had planned the 9/11 attacks ... Person like me neither knew WTC nor Osama or Al-Qaeda,"

Saghir also described female GIs sexually harassing him.

== See also ==
- Mohammed Sadiq another elderly prisoner held at Guantanamo
- Haji Faiz Mohammed elderly prisoner held at Guantanamo
