= Kandahar Central Jail =

Prison in Kandahar, Afghanistan

- Interactive map of Kandahar Central Jail
- Location: Kandahar, Afghanistan; 31°37′08″N 65°40′05″E
- Status: Operational
- Security class: Minimum
- Capacity: 1,900
- Managed by: Ministry of Interior Affairs
- Warden: Sayed Akhtar Mohammad Agha Hussaini

Kandahar Central Jail, also known as Sarpuza Prison, is a minimum-security prison in Kandahar, Afghanistan. It is located next to the Kandahar-Herat Highway in the Sarpuza neighborhood of the city, between the Chilzina Complex and Dand Chawk (Dand Square). Its current warden is Sayed Akhtar Mohammad Agha Hussaini.

The Kandahar Central Jail has been historically used for the incarceration of common criminals of Kandahar Province, some of whom turn out to be innocent and released. In the last two decades, the facility has also been used to house Taliban and other insurgents. In 2017, the prison had approximately 1,900 inmates.

The prison has been subject to two major escapes, first in a coordinated attack in May 2008, and latter in a tunneling escape in April 2011. There has been discussions on relocating Kandahar Central Jail to the neighboring Daman District, which is to the southeast of Kandahar District. Over 1,000 prisoners were released from the prison by Taliban forces in August 2021, after they gained control of the city as part of the 2021 Taliban offensive.

== History ==
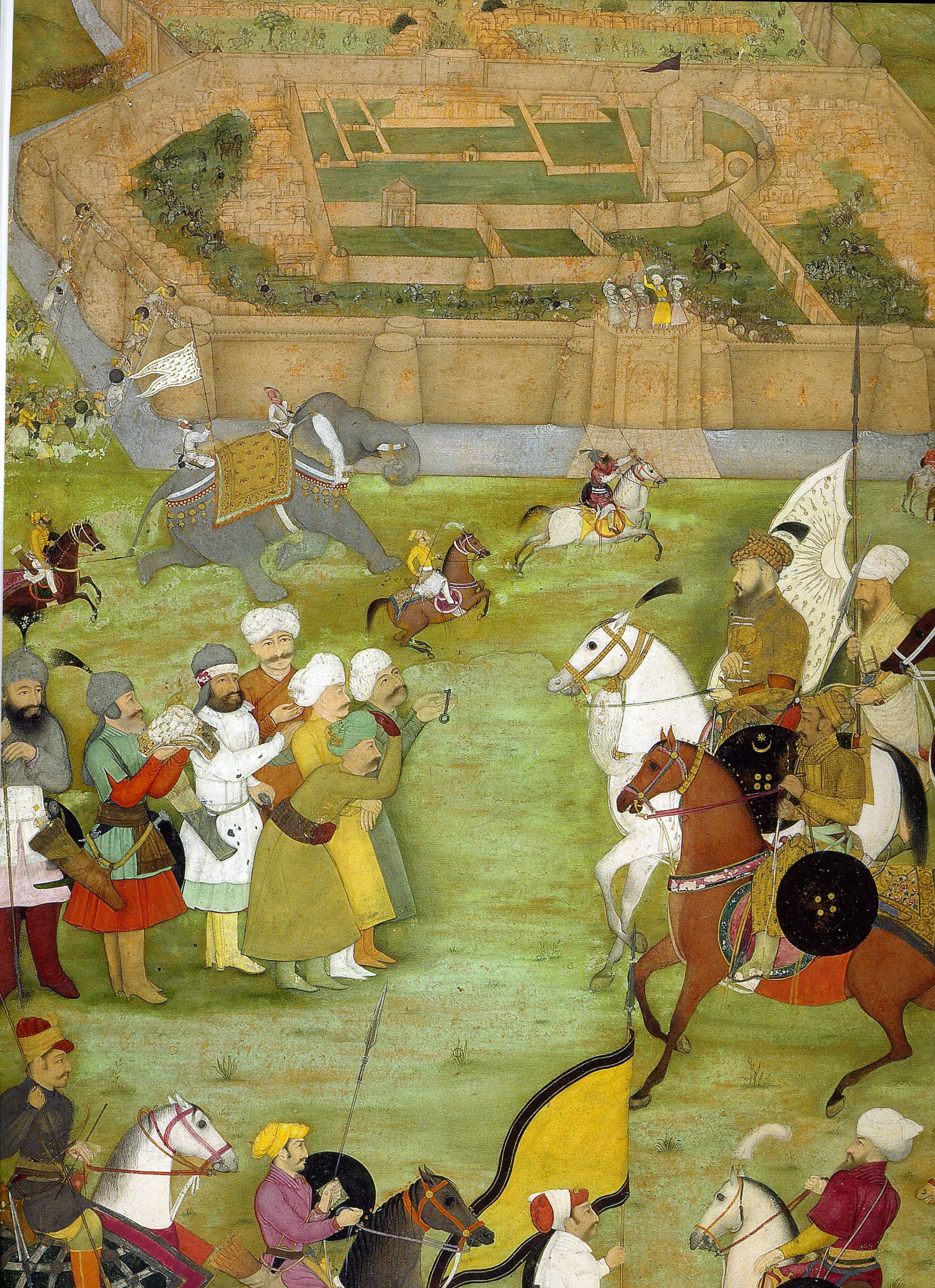
A miniature from Padshahnama depicting the surrender of the Safavids in 1638 to the Mughal army of Shah Jahan at what is now called Old Kandahar. The Sarpuza Prison, which at that time was used as a garrison or military base, is clearly seen at the top.

The year in which the Sarpuza Prison was first built is unconfirmed. Some believe it was originally built by Maurya Emperor Ashoka in the 3rd century BC. Prior to Ashoka, Alexander the Great had established Alexandria Arachosia in what is now called Old Kandahar.

Sarpuza Prison was used as a garrison or military base by many subsequent empires and rulers. It was renovated in the 1960s to house common criminals of Kandahar Province. Two prisoners who had kidnapped and murdered four tourists from France were executed by hanging in 1972. During that time some western tourists caught with drugs were also held there pending trial. It was casual for the westerners because smoking hashish was permitted inside the prison. There was in fact a large hookah set up under a tree that the inmates smoked from. During the 1980s, the facility was used by KHAD to detain and torture members of the Afghan mujahideen.

According to American intelligence analysts, the Taliban used the prison as a "political prison". The Taliban had confined Ismail Khan at Sarpuza prison for a short time in 1999. Guantanamo detainee Abd Al Rahim Abdul Raza Janko described being held in the prison following his torture by the Taliban.

The record shows that the prison continued to be used during the Islamic Republic era for detention and interrogation. Guantanamo detainee Sultan Sari Sayel Al Anazi faced the allegation that when he was held in the prison, prior to being sent to Guantanamo: he was among the detainees who collaborated with other prisoners to hide money in mattresses and bed frames.

A number of the captives were later transported in May 2012 to extrajudicial detention in the Guantanamo Bay detention camps, in Cuba, and finally to the Parwan Detention Facility next to Bagram Air Base north of Kabul.

== Captives reported to have been in held in American custody in Kandahar ==
Abdul Bin Mohammed Bin Abess Ourgy	Testified he was held in Kabul, Kandahar and Bagram before he was transferred to Guantanamo.
Abdul Hai Mutmaen	Former assistant to Wakil Ahmed Muttawakil, the last Taliban Foreign Minister.; Fazal Mohammad reported he had seen Muttawakil, and his former assistants Wakil Ahmed Muttawakil and Khirullah Khairkhwa being abused when they were both held in Kandahar in 2002.
Fazal Mohammad	An alleged former Taliban commander, asserted that the authorities in Kandahar fed the captives starvation rations; did not treat their wounds; subjected them to beatings, sexual humiliation, and attacks by vicious dogs.
Khirullah Said Wali Khairkhwa	Khirullah Khairkhwa was the Taliban's Governor of Herat Province in 2000 and early 2001.; Fazal Mohammad reported he had seen Khirullah Khairkhwa being abused when they were both held in Kandahar in 2002.; Khirullah Khairkhwa was transferred to Guantanamo.
Murat Kurnaz	A German resident, has testified before the German parliament that his American captors allowed German special forces to beat and threaten him in Kandahar.; Eventually transferred to Guantanamo.
Sayed Nabi Siddiqui	Afghan police officer who claims he was abused during 40 days he spent in US custody in 2004.; Sayed Nabi Siddiqui reports being held in Gardez, Kandahar, Bagram
Wakil Ahmed Muttawakil	Wakil Ahmed Muttawakil was the last Taliban Foreign Minister.; Wakil Ahmed Muttawakil sent the USA prior warning of the upcoming attacks on September 11, 2001.; Defected from the Taliban in October 2001, prior to his capture.; Fazal Mohammad reported he had seen Muttawakil being abused when they were both held in Kandahar in 2002.

=== Prison attack of 2008 ===
In May 2008, about 200 prisoners went on hunger strike protesting detention without charge for up to two years. Many others faced summary trials they felt were unfair. Forty-seven inmates physically stitched their mouths shut. The strike ended when the Afghan parliament agreed to review their detentions.

On June 13, 2008, the Taliban orchestrated the escape of around 1,200 prisoners, including 350 Taliban by having two suicide bombers in a tanker truck blow up the main gates. Subsequently, 30 men arrived on motorcycles, killed 15 guards, and broke the locks on every cell.

=== Tunneling escape of 2011 ===
On April 24, 2011, a 350m tunnel that had been dug across a highway and under the prison walls, was used in the escape of about 475 Taliban inmates. The escape has been compared to the Stalag Luft III tunnel escape in World War 2. The breakout was not detected for four hours, during which most of the prisoners were transported away. It was reported that at least 71 of the escapees were recaptured.

=== Riot and release of prisoners in 2021 ===
During the Battle of Kandahar, which was part of the 2021 Taliban offensive, a riot broke out in the prison in which one prisoner was killed and 10 others injured. After gaining control of the city on 12 August 2021, the Taliban released over 1,000 prisoners.

== See also ==
- List of prisons in Afghanistan
