= Sheberghan =

Sheberghan شبرغان
- Provincial capital
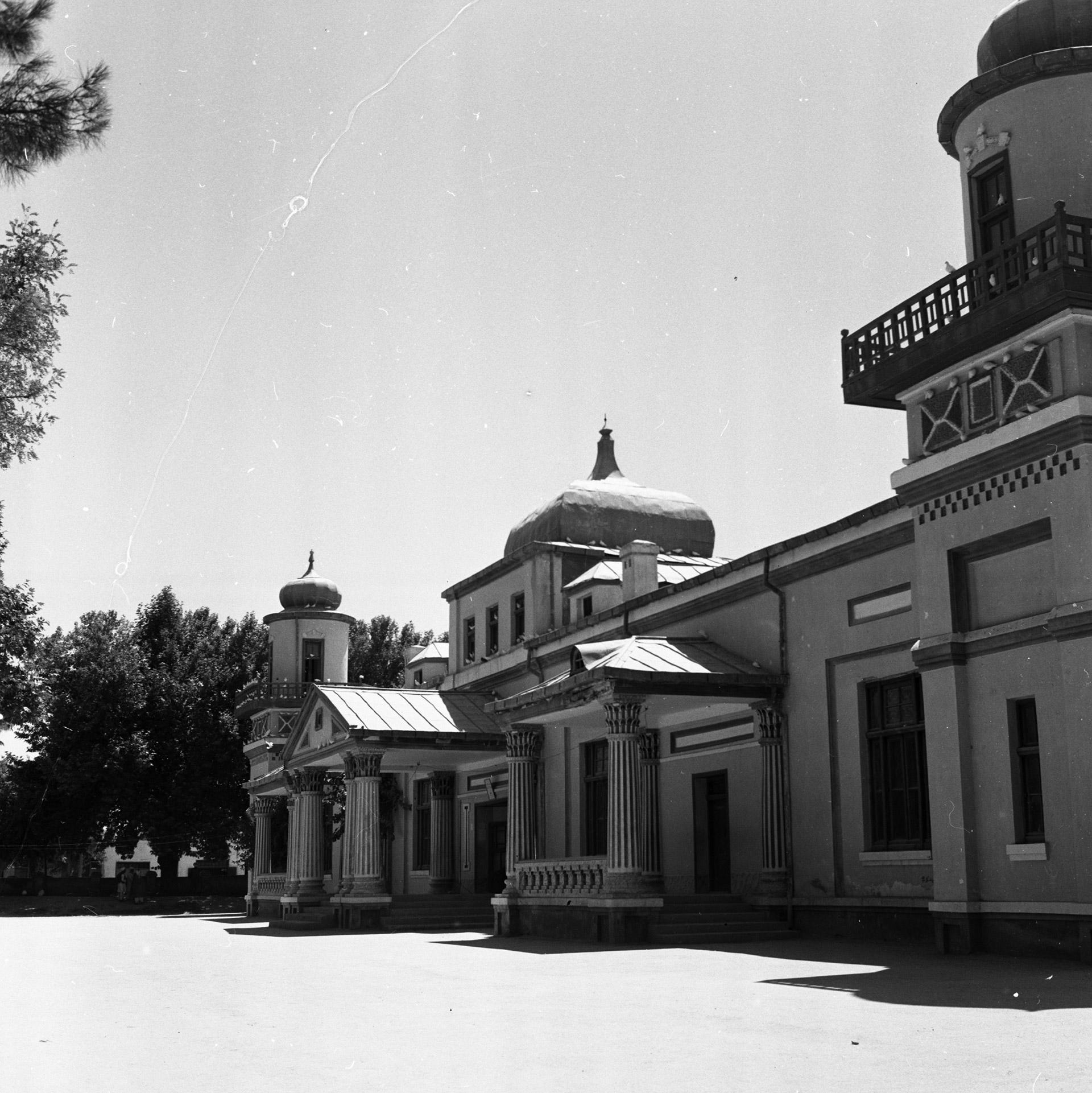
- Sheberghan palace in 1976

- Location in Afghanistan Sheberghan (West and Central Asia)
- Coordinates: 36°39′54″N 65°45′07.2″E
- Country: Afghanistan
- Province: Jowzjan
- District: Sheberghan

Government
  - Type: Municipality
  - Mayor: Habibullah Qane

Area
  - Land: 73 km^{2} (28 sq mi)
- Elevation: 335 m (1,099 ft)

Population (2025)
  - Provincial capital: 213,411
  - Density: 2,900/km^{2} (7,600/sq mi)
  - Urban: 105,393
  - Rural: 108,018
- Time zone: UTC+04:30 (Afghanistan Time)
- ISO 3166 code: AF-SHB

Sheberghan, (Note: Pashto: شبرغان, romanized: Šibarğān [ʃi.baɾ.ɣɑn]; Dari: شبرغان, romanized: Šibarğān [ʃɪ.báɾ.ɣɑ́ːn]) also written as Shibarghan, Shaburghan or Shebirghan, and historically known as Shahpurgan, is a city in northern Afghanistan, serving as the capital of Jowzjan Province. It is within the jurisdiction of Sheberghan District and has an estimated population of 213,411 people. Habibullah Qane serves as the current mayor of the city.

Sheberghan is home to Jowzjan University, which is located in center of the city. The Sheberghan Airfield is situated about 20 km (12 mi) to the northeast between Sheberghan and Aqcha. The city has a number of bazaars, business centers, public parks, banks, hotels, restaurants, mosques, hospitals, universities, and places to play sports or just relax.

Shebgerghan is at an altitude of 335 m (1,099 ft) above sea level and has a land area of 73 km^{2} (28 sq mi) or 7,335 ha (18,130 acres). It is administratively divided into 4 city districts (nahias). In 2025 there were 19,511 dwelling units in the city. The Afghanistan Ring Road connects the city with Mazar-i-Sharif to the east, Maymana to the southwest and Andkhoy to the northwest.

== Etymology ==
The city's name is a corruption of its classical Persian name, Shaporgân, meaning "[King] Shapur's town". Shapur was the name of two Sasanian kings, both of whom built a great number of cities. However, Shapur I was the governor of the eastern provinces of the empire, and it is more likely that he is the builder of a roadway between a few important cities. These include Nishapur and Bishapur in Iran, and Peshawar in Pakistan.

== History ==
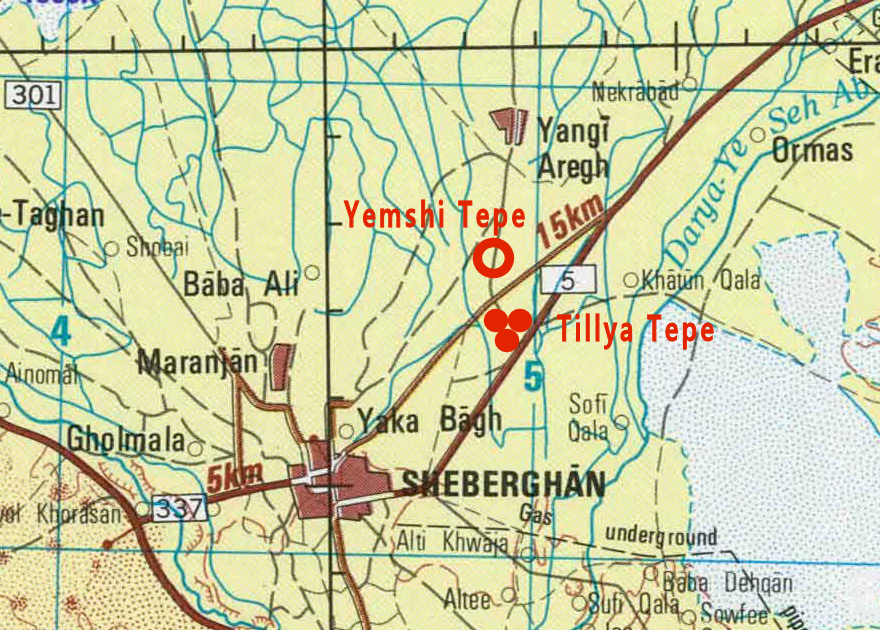
Circular fortress of Yemshi Tepe (to scale), and tumuli of Tillya Tepe, near Sheberghan.

Sheberghan was once a flourishing settlement along the Silk Road. In 1978, Soviet archaeologists discovered the famed Bactrian Gold in the village of Tillia Tepe outside Sheberghan. In the 13th century Marco Polo visited the city and later wrote about its honey-sweet melons. Sheberghan became the capital of an independent Uzbek khanate that was allotted to Afghanistan by the 1873 Anglo-Russian border agreement.

Sheberghan has for millennia been the focal point of power in the northeast corner of Bactria. It still sits astride the main route between Balkh and Herat, and controls the direct route north to the Amu Darya, about 90 km (56 mi) away, as well as the important branch route south to Sar-e Pol.

In 1856, J. P. Ferrier reported:

The town has a citadel, in which the governor Rustem Khan resides, but there are no other fortifications. It is surrounded by good gardens and excellent cultivation. The population of Shibberghan has a high character for bravery, and I may safely say it is one of the finest towns in Turkistan on this side of the Oxus, enjoying, besides its other advantages, an excellent climate. It is, however, subject to one very serious inconvenience: the supply of water, on which all this prosperity depends, comes from the mountains in the Khanat of Sirpool; and as there are frequent disputes between the tribes inhabiting it and those living in the town, a complete interruption of the supply is often threatened, and a war follows, to the very great injury of the place. Shibberghan maintains permanently a force of 2000 horse and 500-foot, but, in case of necessity, the town can arm 6000 men.

The heavily fortified town of Yemshi-tepe, just five kilometres to the northeast of modern Sheberghan, on the road to Akcha, is only about 500 m (550 yd) from the famous necropolis of Tillia Tepe, where an immense treasure was excavated from the graves of the local royal family by a joint Soviet-Afghan archaeological effort from 1969 to 1979. In 1977, a Soviet-Afghan archaeological team began excavations 5 km (3.1 mi) north of the town for relics. They uncovered mud-brick columns and a cross-shaped altar of an ancient temple dating back to at least 1000 B.C. Six royal tombs were excavated at Tillia Tepe revealing a vast amount of gold and other treasures. Several coins dated to the early 1st century C.E., with none dated later.

Sheberghan has been proposed as the site of ancient Xidun, one of the five xihou, or divisions, of the early Kushan Empire.

Sheberghan was the stronghold of Abdul Rashid Dostum while vying with his rival Atta Muhammad Nur for control of northern Afghanistan in the early years of the Karzai administration.

Sheberghan was the site of the Dasht-i-Leili massacre in December 2001 during the U.S. invasion of Afghanistan in which between 250 and 3,000 (depending on sources) Taliban prisoners were shot or suffocated to death in metal truck containers, while being transferred by American and Northern Alliance soldiers from Kunduz to a Sheberghan Prison.

On 7 August 2021, Taliban forces captured Sheberghan as part of their nationwide military offensive.

== Geography ==
Sheberghan is located along the Sari Pul River banks, about 130 km (81 mi) west of Mazar-i-Sharif on the Afghanistan Ring Road. The city is a trading and transit hub in northern Afghanistan. Agriculture accounts for 50% of the 7,335 hectares within the municipal boundaries. About 23% of the land is residential, and largely clustered in the central area, but well distributed through the four districts.

=== Climate ===
Sheberghan has a cool, semi-arid climate (Köppen climate classification BSk) with hot summers and chilly, though variable, winters. There is moderate rainfall and some snowfall from January to March, but the rest of the year is dry, especially the summer.

Climate data for Sheberghan
| Month | Jan | Feb | Mar | Apr | May | Jun | Jul | Aug | Sep | Oct | Nov | Dec | Year |
|---|---|---|---|---|---|---|---|---|---|---|---|---|---|
| Record high °C (°F) | 22.4 (72.3) | 24.2 (75.6) | 30.9 (87.6) | 35.4 (95.7) | 41.5 (106.7) | 46.0 (114.8) | 47.5 (117.5) | 44.3 (111.7) | 40.6 (105.1) | 36.4 (97.5) | 30.6 (87.1) | 25.6 (78.1) | 47.5 (117.5) |
| Mean daily maximum °C (°F) | 6.8 (44.2) | 9.3 (48.7) | 15.8 (60.4) | 23.7 (74.7) | 31.1 (88.0) | 36.9 (98.4) | 38.9 (102.0) | 37.2 (99.0) | 32.0 (89.6) | 24.0 (75.2) | 16.7 (62.1) | 10.6 (51.1) | 23.6 (74.5) |
| Daily mean °C (°F) | 2.0 (35.6) | 4.9 (40.8) | 10.5 (50.9) | 17.3 (63.1) | 23.2 (73.8) | 28.8 (83.8) | 31.0 (87.8) | 28.6 (83.5) | 23.1 (73.6) | 16.4 (61.5) | 10.0 (50.0) | 5.4 (41.7) | 16.8 (62.2) |
| Mean daily minimum °C (°F) | −1.3 (29.7) | 1.3 (34.3) | 5.7 (42.3) | 11.5 (52.7) | 15.1 (59.2) | 19.4 (66.9) | 22.2 (72.0) | 20.0 (68.0) | 15.1 (59.2) | 9.8 (49.6) | 4.6 (40.3) | 1.5 (34.7) | 10.4 (50.7) |
| Record low °C (°F) | −20.5 (−4.9) | −25.7 (−14.3) | −9.4 (15.1) | −7.5 (18.5) | 5.3 (41.5) | 8.5 (47.3) | 12.9 (55.2) | 11.6 (52.9) | 4.3 (39.7) | −2.4 (27.7) | −8.5 (16.7) | −15.0 (5.0) | −25.7 (−14.3) |
| Average precipitation mm (inches) | 42.3 (1.67) | 44.3 (1.74) | 56.4 (2.22) | 25.9 (1.02) | 11.2 (0.44) | 0.2 (0.01) | 0.0 (0.0) | 0.0 (0.0) | 0.2 (0.01) | 6.6 (0.26) | 13.6 (0.54) | 29.8 (1.17) | 230.5 (9.08) |
| Average rainy days | 5 | 6 | 9 | 6 | 3 | 0 | 0 | 0 | 0 | 2 | 3 | 4 | 38 |
| Average snowy days | 5 | 3 | 1 | 0 | 0 | 0 | 0 | 0 | 0 | 0 | 1 | 2 | 12 |
| Average relative humidity (%) | 78 | 76 | 71 | 65 | 47 | 34 | 31 | 32 | 35 | 46 | 61 | 74 | 54 |
| Mean monthly sunshine hours | 115.3 | 124.1 | 162.3 | 198.2 | 297.9 | 364.3 | 365.9 | 346.1 | 304.6 | 242.9 | 175.8 | 125.7 | 2,823.1 |
Source: NOAA (1964-1983)

== Demographics ==
Sheberghan has an estimated population of 213,411 people. Ethnically, they are mostly Turkmens and Uzbeks. Other ethnic groups such as Tajiks, Pashtuns, Hazaras and Arabs can also be found residing in the city. Dari and Pashto are the official languages of Afghanistan, while Turkmeni is the first language of a large percent of Sheberghan's natives. In 1856, J. P. Ferrier wrote: "Sheberghān is a town containing 12,000 souls. Uzbeks being in the great majority."

The Arabs of Sheberghan are mostly Dari-speaking, even though they claim to be of Arab descent, due to religious or historical reasons. There are other such Dari and Pashto-speaking Arabs to the east, with many residing in Mazar-i Sharif, Kholm, Kunduz, Kabul, and Jalalabad. Their self-identification as Arabs is largely based on their tribal identity, and may in fact point to the Arab migration of the 7th and 8th centuries migration to this and other Central Asian locales in the wake of the Muslim conquests of Afghanistan, as it is traditionally analyzed through their historical lineage. It was common in the past for Arabs to live in the region.

== Economy ==
Sheberghan is surrounded by irrigated agricultural land, which supplies fruits and vegetables to other cities.

It is also important to the energy infrastructure of Afghanistan. With Soviet assistance, exploitation of Afghanistan's natural gas reserves began in 1967 at the Khowaja Gogerak field, 15 km (9.3 mi) east of Sheberghan in Jowzjan Province. The field's reserves were thought to be 67 billion cubic meters. In 1967, the Soviets also completed a 100-kilometer gas pipeline linking Keleft in the Soviet Union with Sheberghan. To demonstrate how natural gas reserves could be used as an alternative to expensive petroleum imports, the United States Department of Defense spent $43 million on a natural gas filling station.

- The Zomrad Sai Oilfield is situated near Sheberghan.
- The Sheberghan Topping Plant processes crude oil for consumption in heating boilers in Kabul, Mazari Sharif, and Sheberghan.
- The Jorqaduk, Khowaja Gogerak, and Yatimtaq gas fields are all located within 20 mi (32 km) of Sheberghan.

== See also ==
- List of cities in Afghanistan

== Bibliography ==
- Barfield, Thomas J. (1982). The Central Asian Arabs of Afghanistan: Pastoral Nomadism in Transition.
- Dupree, Nancy Hatch. (1977). An Historical Guide to Afghanistan. 1st Edition: 1970. 2nd Edition (1977). Revised and Enlarged. Afghan Tourist Organization, 1977. Chapter 21 "Maimana to Mazar-i-Sharif."
- Ferrier, J. P. (1856), Caravan Journeys and Wanderings in Persia, Afghanistan, Turkistan and Beloochistan. John Murray, London.
- Hill, John E. (2009). Through the Jade Gate to Rome: A Study of the Silk Routes during the Later Han Dynasty, 1st to 2nd Centuries CE. BookSurge, Charleston, South Carolina. ISBN 978-1-4392-2134-1.
- Leriche, Pierre. (2007). "Bactria: Land of a Thousand Cities." In: After Alexander: Central Asia before Islam. Eds. Georgina Hermann and Joe Cribb. (2007). Proceedings of the British Academy 133. Oxford University Press.
- Sarianidi, Victor. (1985). The Golden Hoard of Bactria: From the Tillya-tepe Excavations in Northern Afghanistan. Harry N. Abrams, New York.
