= Yemshi Tepe =

Ancient Afghan fortress

- Yemshi Tepe
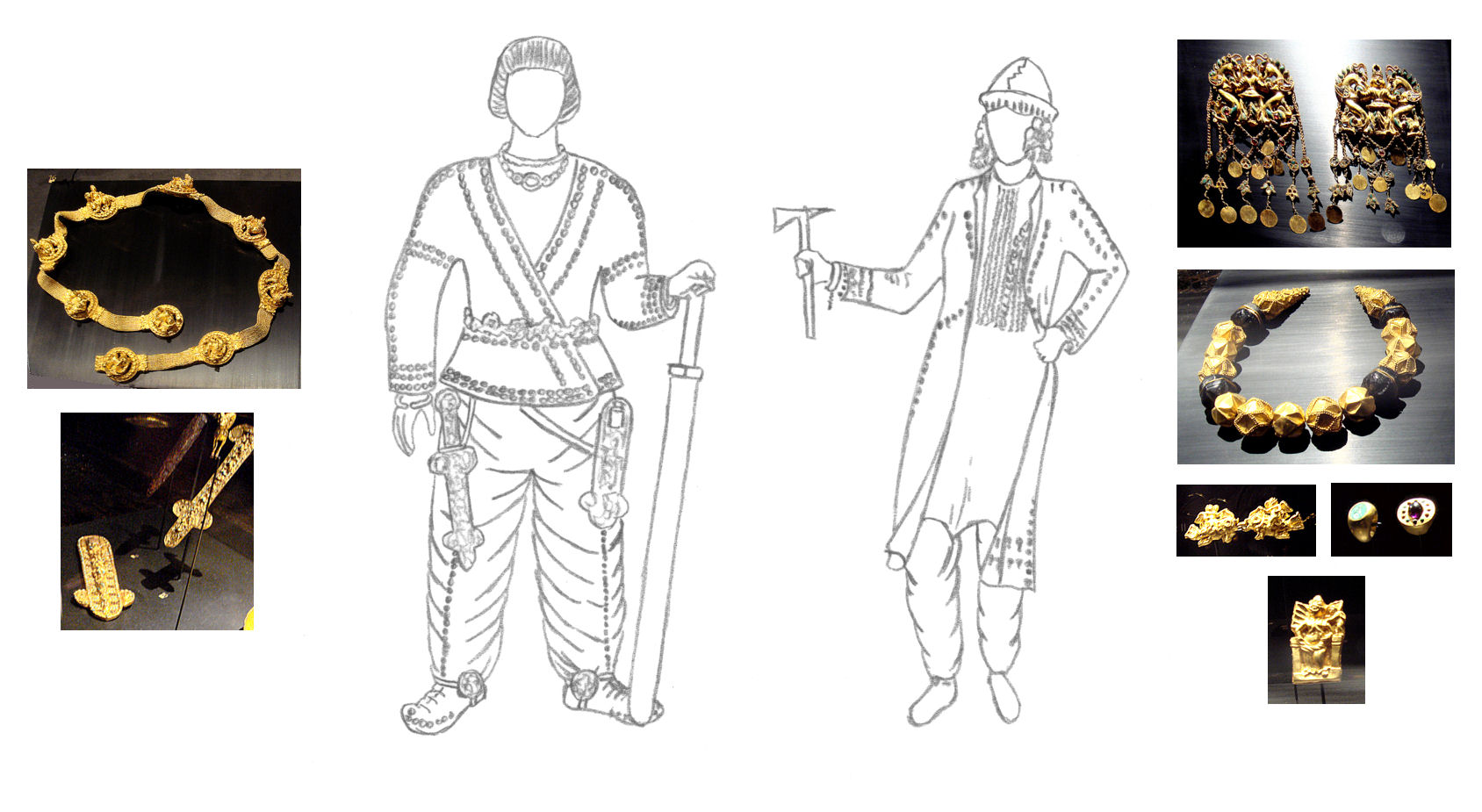
- Reconstitution of two members of the nearby Tillya Tepe burial, probable rulers of Yemshi Tepe, with corresponding artifacts: man (r. tomb IV) and woman (l. tomb II).

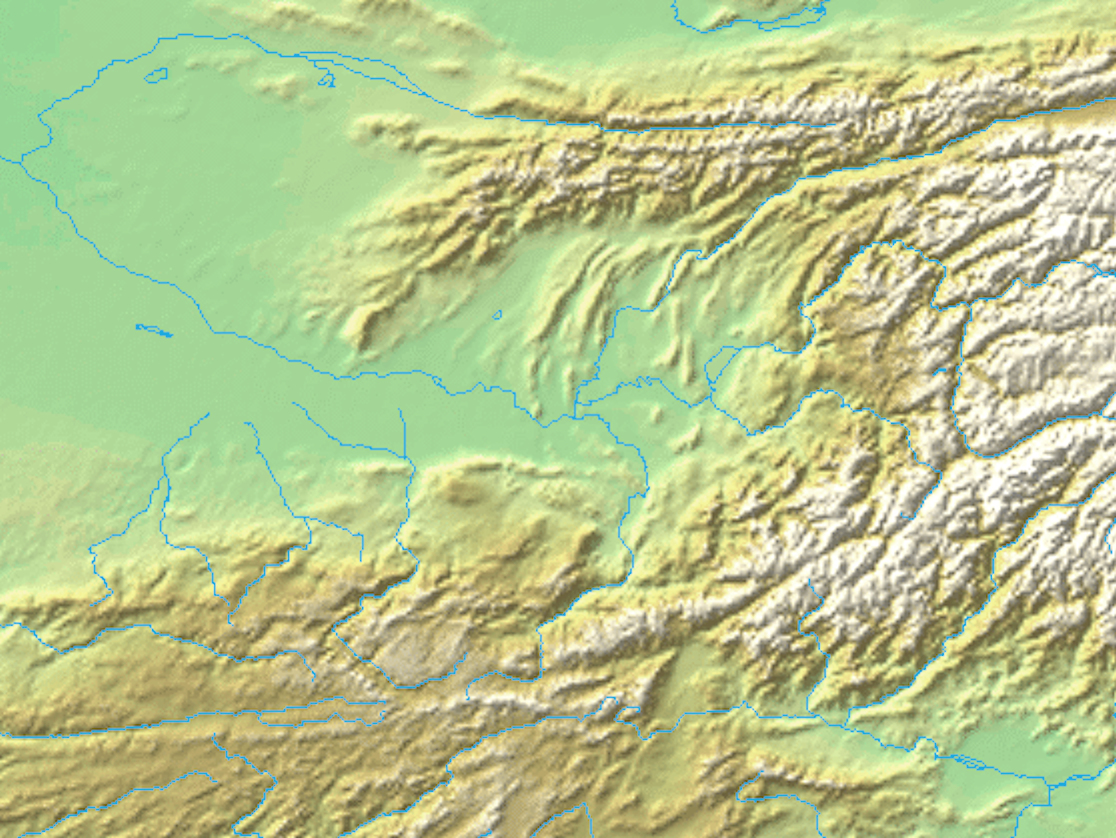
- Location within South Asia Location within Bactria Location within Afghanistan
- 36°42′23″N 65°47′13″E
- Type: Fortress
- Location: Afghanistan

Site notes
- Excavation dates: 1938
- Condition: Ruined

Yemshi Tepe, also Emchi-Tepe or Imshik, is an ancient circular fortress in Afghanistan, 5 kilometers to the northeast of the city of Sheberghan. It is about 100 kilometers west of Balkh, the capital of ancient Bactria.

The city occupies around 20 hectares, and was built probably by a Hellenistic period foundation at the time of the Kushan Empire in the first centuries after the birth of Christ. It was abandoned in the Sassanid period, therefore its ancient name is unknown. The shape of the city was round, about 500 meters in diameter, and had walls with several gates. In the north of the city there was a kind of a castle and next to it a luxurious building that probably served the local rulers. At the end of the 1960s, Afghan-Soviet excavations took place in the city, and a Greek ostracon and various statues were found among other things.

According to the Soviet archaeologist Sarianidi in 1985:

Its tall, mighty walls pierced by several narrow gateways were fortified by defence towers and formed an impregnable ring ... . Inside, in the northern section, stood the citadel, at whose foot were the remains of what had apparently been the palatial residence of the local ruler. Some 50 acres (20 ha) in area, this ancient city, indubitably a vast one for its time, comprised, along with the small villages of its sprawling suburbs, the administrative seat of the entire neighbouring region, once part of the legendary empire of Bactria.

The circular fortification has a circumference of 1.5 km, and a surface of 18 ha. The round shape of the settlement is rather typical of the structure of Bactrian fortifications of the 1st millennium BCE, such as the fortresses of Balkh or Merv.

Yemshi Tepe is in close proximity (about 500 metres) to the archaeological burial site of Tillya Tepe, dated to 50 BCE-50 CE: it is thought that the rulers of Yemshi Tepe were a branch of the Kushans who were buried in the nearby Tillya Tepe tumuli. Yemshi Tepe is generally described as "a Kushan town".

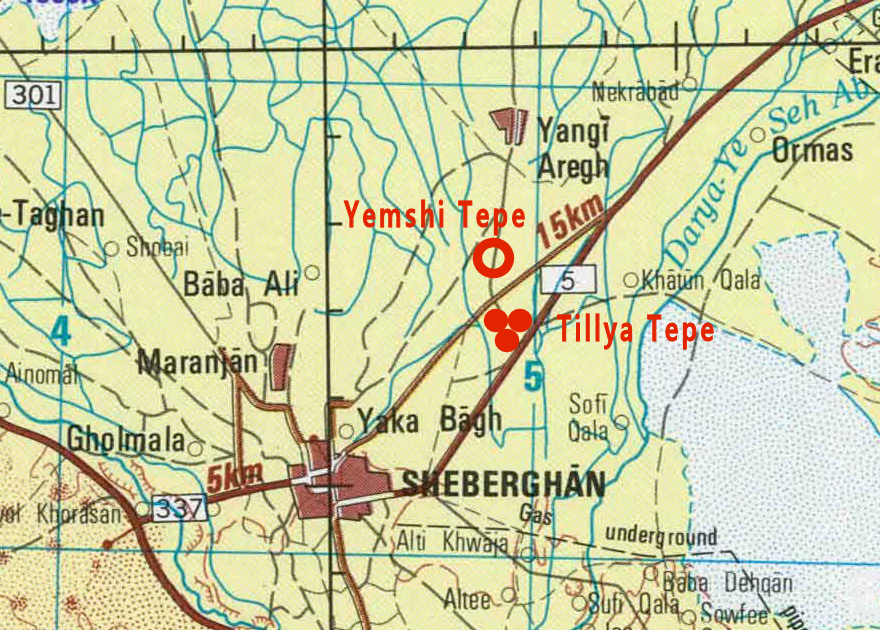
Circular fortress of Yemshi Tepe (to scale), and tumuli of Tillya Tepe, near Sheberghan.

== Literature ==
- VI Sarianidi : Bactrian Gold. From the Excavations of the Tillya-Tepe Necropolis in Northern Afghanistan. Aurora, Leningrad 1985, p. 7.
- Warwick Ball: Archaeological Gazetteer of Afghanistan. = Catalog des sites archéologiques d'Afghanistan. Éditions Recherche sur les Civilizations, Paris 1982, p. 96 (Synthèse 8).
