= Amyntas (son of Nicolaus) =

Amyntas (Greek: Ἀμύντας) son of Nicolaus; perhaps the brother of Pantauchus, and thus from Aloros was a Macedonian general and a satrap of Bactria.
