= Pantauchus =

Macedonian officer, general of Demetrius I Poliorcetes

Pantauchus (Greek: Πάνταυχος, romanized: Pantauchos; late 4th century BC – 3rd century BC), (son of Nicolaus, from Aloros) was a Macedonian trierarch of Nearchus's fleet and general during the short reign of Demetrius Poliorcetes (294 - 288 BC).

He was considered to be the bravest as well as physically the strongest among Demetrius' army commanders. When Demetrius decided to invade Aetolia, king Pyrrhus of Epirus set out to meet him with his army. However, the two armies marched following different directions and did not encounter each other. As a result, Demetrius started pillaging Epirote territory. He had stationed a large proportion of his forces in Aetolia under Pantauchus' orders.

Consequently, Pyrrhus led his troops into battle against Pantauchus. The conflict was remarkable for its intensity and harsh nature, since commanders from both sides displayed great courage and dare. Pantauchus challenged king Pyrrhus himself and soon enough a hard duel began between them. Initially, they used their spears but after a while they engaged in hand to hand combat with swords. The two men were skillful fighters and Pantauchus struck the Epirote king once but Pyrrhus wounded his opponent in the thigh and along the neck. The Macedonian general was forced to flee and his companions managed to rescue him.

Pyrrhus' legendary personal valor and fighting ability proved crucial for the battle's result, since the Epirotes were greatly inspired by their ruler's example and crushed the enemy phalanx. Several retreating Macedonians were killed and 5,000 were captured.

== See also ==
- Amyntas (son of Nicolaus)
