= Tillya Tepe =

Archaeological site in Jowzjan

- Tillya Tepe
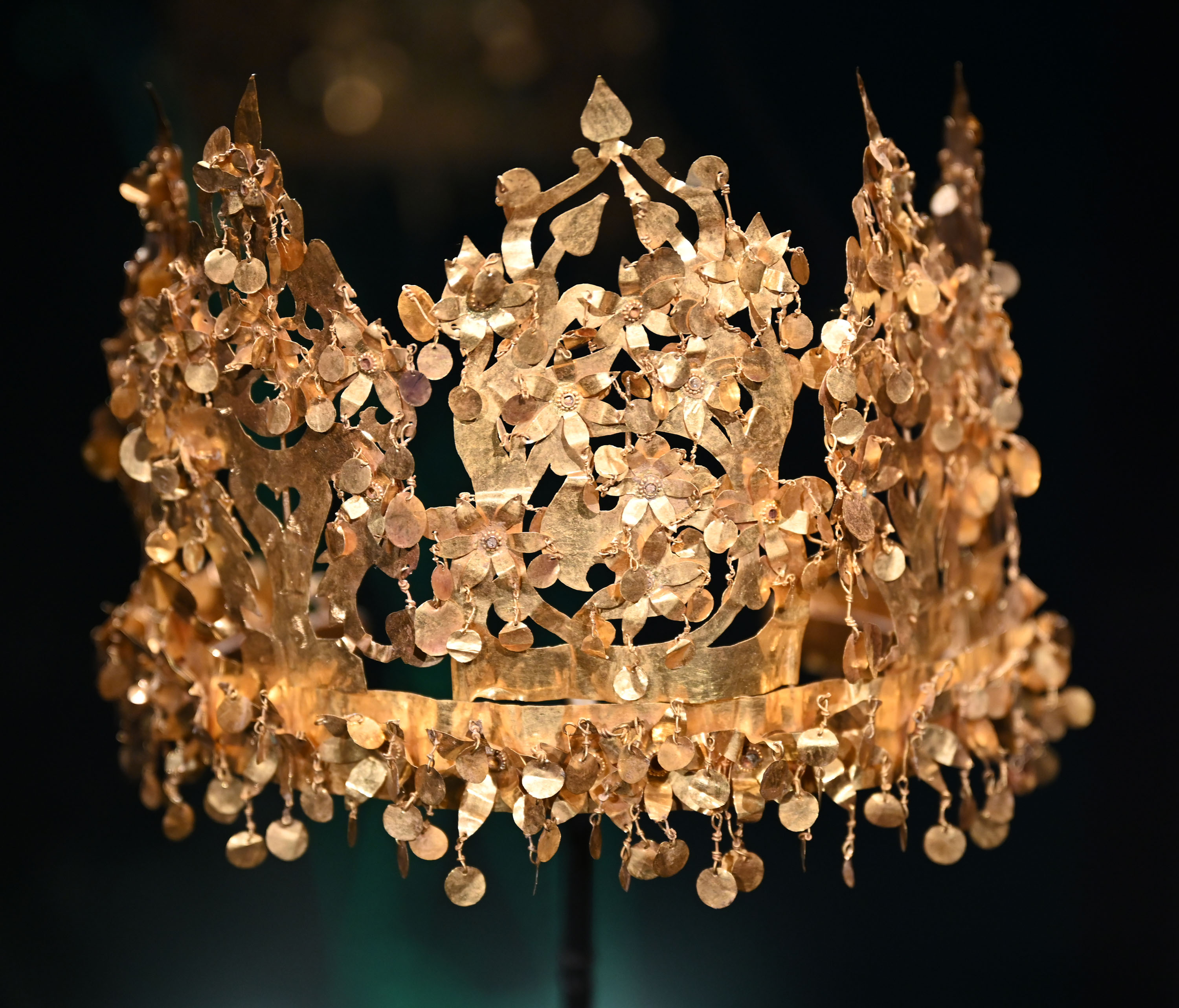
- Crown from Tomb VI (female owner)

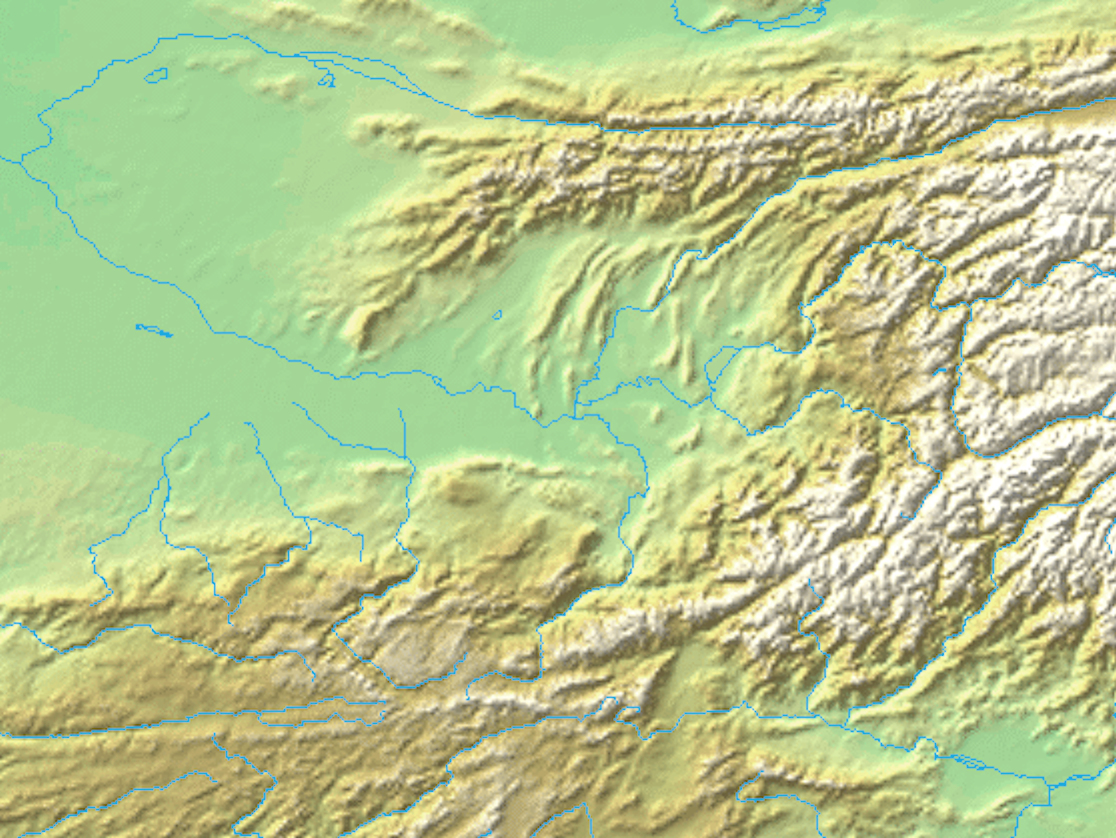
- Location within Continental Asia Location within Bactria Location within Afghanistan
- 36°41′40″N 65°47′22″E
- Type: Burial ground
- Location: Afghanistan

Tillya tepe, Tillia tepe or Tillā tapa (Persian: طلاتپه, romanized: Ṭalā-tappe, literally "Golden Hill" or "Golden Mound") is an archaeological site in the northern Afghanistan province of Jowzjan near Sheberghan, excavated in 1978 by a Soviet-Afghan team led by the Soviet archaeologist Viktor Sarianidi. The hoard found there is often known as the Bactrian gold.

The hoard is a collection of about 20,600 ornaments, coins and other kinds of artifacts, made of gold, silver, ivory, etc., that were found in six burial mounds erected for five women and one man, with extremely rich jewelry, dated to around the 1st century BCE-1st century CE. The ornaments include necklaces set with semi-precious stones, belts, medallions and a crown. After its discovery, the hoard went missing during the wars in Afghanistan, until it was "rediscovered" and first brought to public attention again in 2003. A new museum in Kabul was being planned where the Bactrian gold would eventually be kept.

The heavily fortified town of Yemshi Tepe, just five kilometres to the northeast of modern Sheberghan on the road to Akcha, is only half a kilometre from the now-famous necropolis of Tillia-tepe.

== Dates and context ==
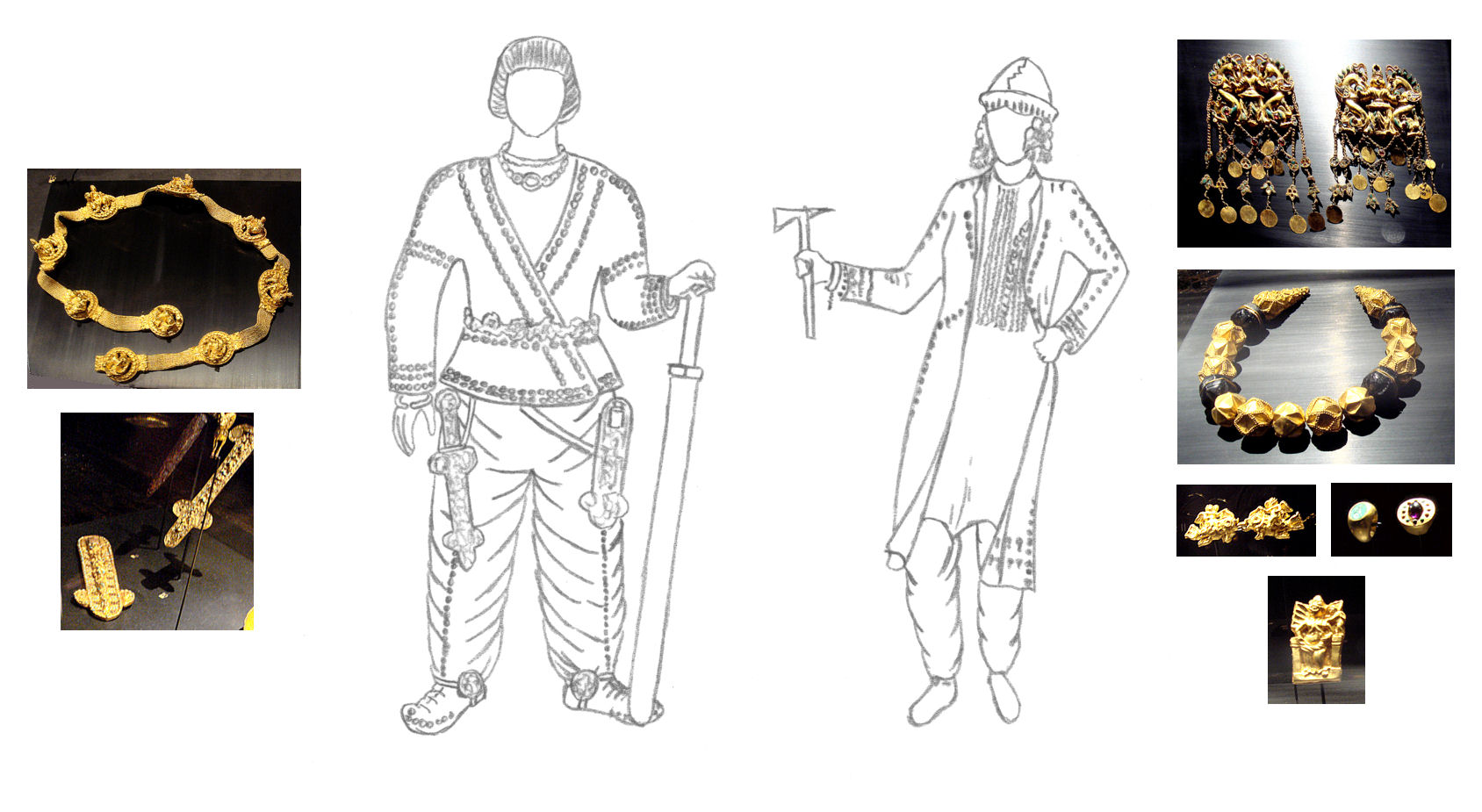
Reconstitution of two members of the Tillya Tepe burial, with corresponding artifacts: man (r. tomb IV) and woman (l. tomb II).

Several coins dated up to the early 1st century CE, with none dated later, suggest a 1st-century CE date for the burial. The coins found in the excavations belonged to Tiberius (16-21 CE), Mithradates II (123-88 BCE), the Yuezhi ruler Sapadbizes (20 BCE - 20 CE) and Indian coin. The burial could correspond to Scythian or Parthian tribes dwelling in the area. More probably, they belonged to the Yuezhis/ early Kushans after the fall of the Greco-Bactrian Kingdom and before the rise of the Kushan Empire. They correspond to a time when the Yuezhis had not yet encountered Buddhism.

A silver coin was found in one of the tombs from the reigns of the Parthian king Mithridates II, who ruled c. 123–88 BCE. The coin was found in tomb III, and was apparently held in the hand of the buried woman.

An imitation gold coin of Parthian King Gotarzes I (95-90 BCE) was found in the left hand of the woman in tomb VI. The fact that this coin is in gold, and not silver or bronze as is usually the case for Parthian coinage, suggest that this imitation was made for prestige purposes. The coin is counterstamped with the frontal depiction of what might have been a local chieftain. The counterstamp was added so as to not damage the portrait of the Parthian king, perhaps indicating some degree of dependency on the Parthians.

A gold coin was also found in tomb III showing the bust in profile of the wreath-crowned Roman Emperor Tiberius. On the reverse is an enthroned, sumptuously draped female figure holding a spray and scepter. Coins of this type were minted in the city of Lugdunum in Gaul, between 16 and 21 CE.

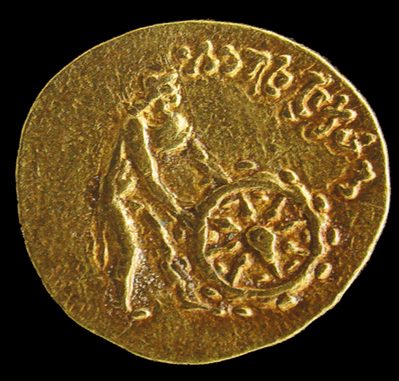
The Tillya Tepe Buddhist coin, with a naked deity wearing chlamys cape and petasus hat pushing the Wheel of the Law. Kabul Museum. This is "most probably Buddha Sakyamuni in a yet non-canonical representation".

A Buddhist gold coin from India was also found in tomb IV (the male warrior). On the reverse it depicts a lion with a nandipada, with the Kharoshthi legend "Sih[o] vigatabhay[o]" ("The lion who dispelled fear"). The obverse shows an almost naked man only wearing an Hellenistic chlamys and a petasus hat (an iconography similar to that of Hermes/ Mercury) rolling a wheel. The legend in Kharoshthi reads "Dharmacakrapravata[ko]" ("The one who turned the Wheel of the Law"). It has been suggested that this may be an early representation of the Buddha.

Finally, a very worn coin has been identified as belonging to the Yuezhi chieftain Heraios, or Sapadbizes (20 BCE - 20 CE).

It is thought that the site most likely belonged to the Yuezhi (future Kushans). Alternatively, it could have belonged to the Sakas (Asian Scythians), who were later to migrate to India, known as Indo-Scythians, or to the Eastern Parthians. Several of the artifacts are highly consistent with a Scythian origin, such as the royal crown or the polylobed decorated daggers discovered in the tombs. Several of the bodies exhibited ritual deformation of the skull, a practice which is well documented among Central Asian nomads of the period.

== Cultural influences ==
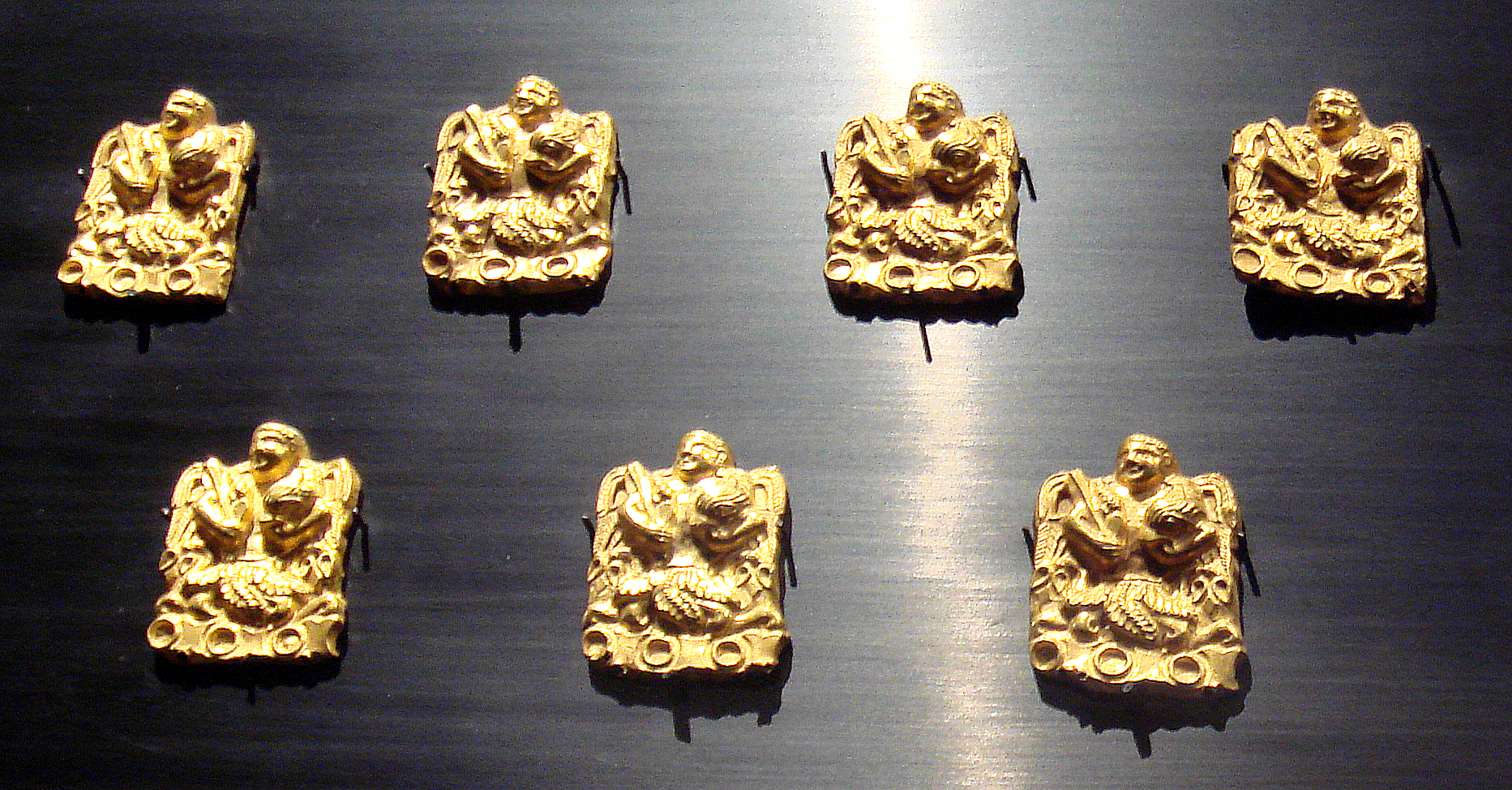
Hellenistic tritons with dolphins (Tomb I.).

These pieces have much in common with the famous Scythian gold artifacts recovered thousands of kilometers west on the banks of the Bosphorus and the Chersonese.

A high cultural syncretism pervades the findings, however. Hellenistic cultural and artistic influences can be found in many of the forms and human depictions (from amorini to rings with the depiction of Athena and her name inscribed in Greek), attributable to the existence of the Seleucid Empire and Greco-Bactrian Kingdom in the same area until around 140 BCE, and the continued existence of the Indo-Greek Kingdom in the northwestern Indian sub-continent until the beginning of our era.

The artifacts were also intermixed with items coming from much farther, such as a few Chinese artifacts, especially Chinese bronze mirrors. One such mirror, inscribed with Chinese poetry, was found placed over the chest of a deceased woman. Found as well were a few Indian artifacts (decorated ivory plates). This seems to be a testimony to the richness of cultural influences in the area of Bactria at that time.

== Loss and re-discovery ==
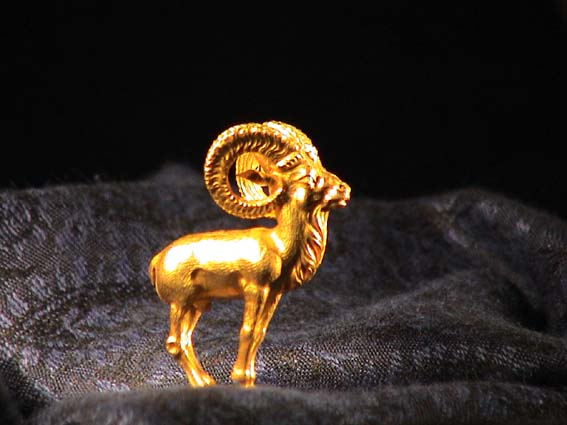
A ram figurine found in the hoard.

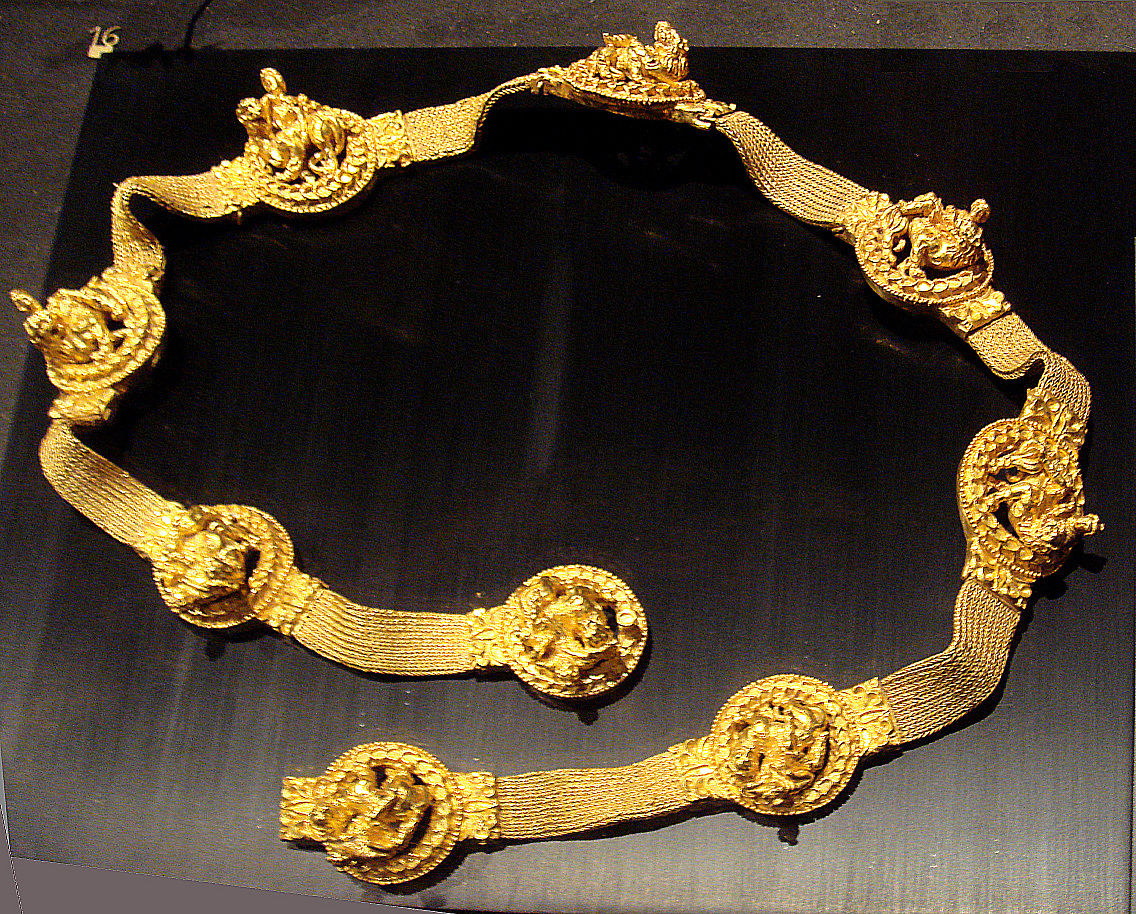
Golden belt, with depictions of Dyonisos (or the syncretic Iranian goddess Nana / Nanaia) riding a lion. Tomb IV

The hoard was thought to have been lost at some point in the 1990s, the National Museum of Afghanistan having been looted numerous times resulting in a loss of 70% of the 100,000 objects on display. In 2003, however, it was found in secret vaults under the central bank building in Kabul.

In 1989 following a committee decision, the last Communist president of Afghanistan, Mohammad Najibullah had ordered the hoard moved from the museum to an underground vault at the Central Bank of Afghanistan in Kabul. The doors of the vault were locked with keys which were distributed to five trusted individuals.

In 2003, after the Taliban was deposed, the new government wanted to open the vault, but the keyholders (called "tawadars") could not be summoned because their names were purposefully unknown. Hamid Karzai had to issue a decree authorizing the attorney general to go ahead with safecracking. But in time, the five key-holders were successfully assembled and the vault opened. Since then, the National Geographic Society has catalogued the collection, which appears to be complete – 22,000 objects. Also witnessing the re-opening were National Geographic Explorer and Archaeology Fellow Fredrik Hiebert and the archaeologist who originally found the hoard, Viktor Sarianidi.

Following an agreement between the Afghan government and France, the collection was evaluated and displayed internationally in an exhibition through the cooperation of several prominent museums and the National Geographic Society. Objects were on display from 2007-2009 variously at the Musée Guimet in Paris, the National Gallery of Art in Washington DC, the Asian Art Museum of San Francisco, the Museum of Fine Arts in Houston, the Metropolitan Museum of Art in New York.

== Exhibitions ==
Some of the most spectacular finds were a part of the traveling exhibition titled "Afghanistan: Hidden Treasures From the National Museum, Kabul" or "Afghanistan: Crossroads of the Ancient World" which were first on display in December 2006 in France’s Musee Guimet in Paris. The exhibition supported by The National Geographic has also been to the National Gallery of Art in Washington, D.C. from May 25 to Sept. 7th, 2008; from Oct. 24th, 2008 to Jan. 25th, 2009 the collection was at the Asian Art Museum of San Francisco; from February 22 to May 17, 2009 it traveled to The Museum of Fine Arts, Houston then to the Metropolitan Museum of Art, New York from June 23 to Sept. 20th, 2009; Canadian Museum of Civilization in Gatineau-Ottawa held the exhibition from October 23, 2009, to March 28, 2010; Bonn Museum in Germany from June 11, 2010 to January 2, 2011, from March 3, 2011 to July 3, 2011 the British Museum in London, and from November 2011 to March 2012, Museum of Ethnography, Stockholm. From 22 March to 28 July 2013, the exhibition was shown at the Melbourne Museum, followed by the Queensland Museum from 5 September 2013 - 27 January 2014, the Art Gallery of New South Wales from 6 March to 1 June 2014, and from July 5 to November 16, 2014 at the Western Australian Museum in Perth and later toured at the Tokyo National Museum from April 12 to June 19, 2016 and later from May 17 to June 17, 2017 at the Palace Museum in Beijing. The exhibition also has toured the Museum of Oriental Art in Turin, Italy, and Nieuwe Kerk in Amsterdam also saw displays. Later on, the travelling exhibition continued at the Hong Kong Museum of History from November 16, 2019 to February 10, 2020.

By 2020, the displays brought in over 350 million Afs ($4.5 million) for Afghanistan. In 2021, Mohammad Tahir Zuhair announced that the gold will be sent abroad for display and safekeeping.

== 2021 ==
In August 2021, the Taliban took control of Kabul, and the treasure is apparently missing yet again.

== Gallery ==
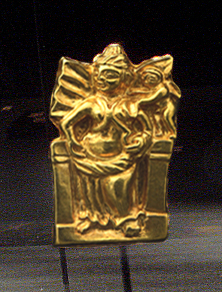
Aphrodite and Eros. Tomb II, Tillia tepe.

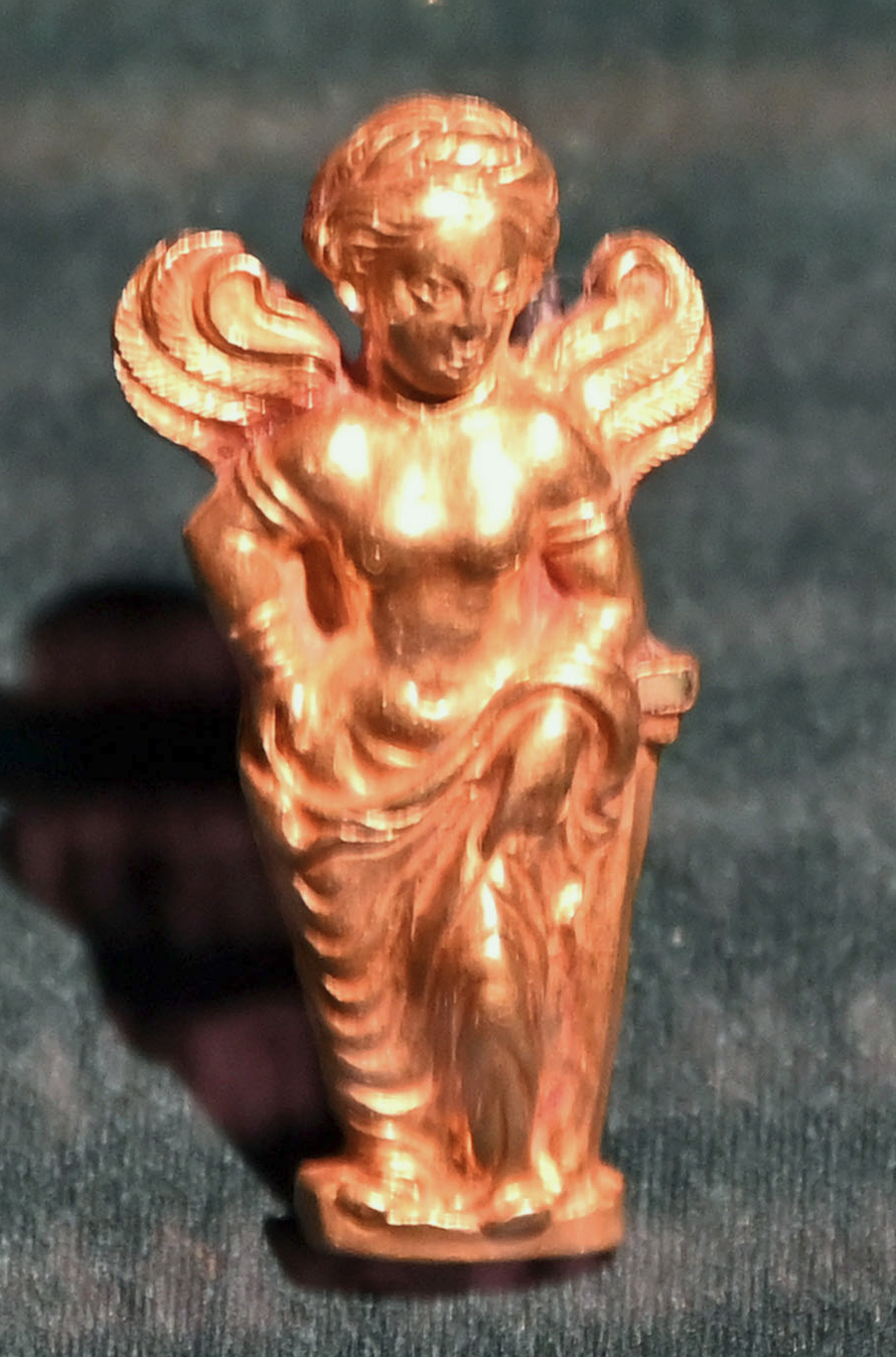
Statuette of winged figurine

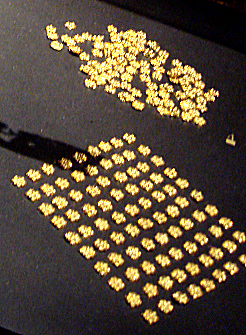
Cloth decorations.

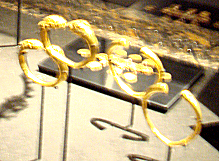
Bracelets.

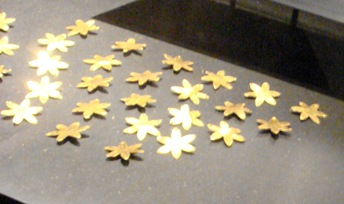
Decorative stars. Tomb I.

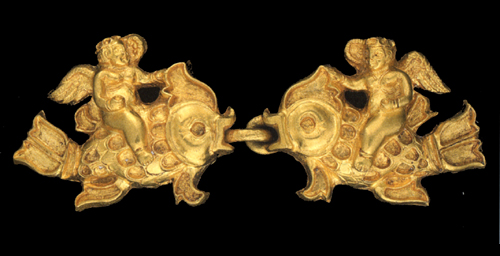
Amorini riding on fish, Tillia tepe. Tomb II.

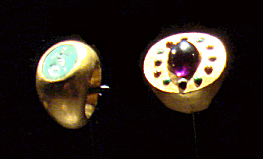
Rings from Tillia tepe; the left one represents a seated Athena. Tomb II.

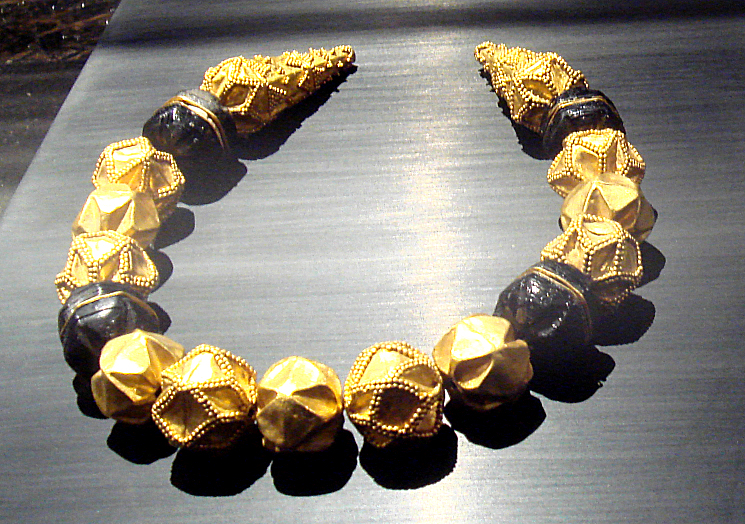
Necklace. Tomb II.

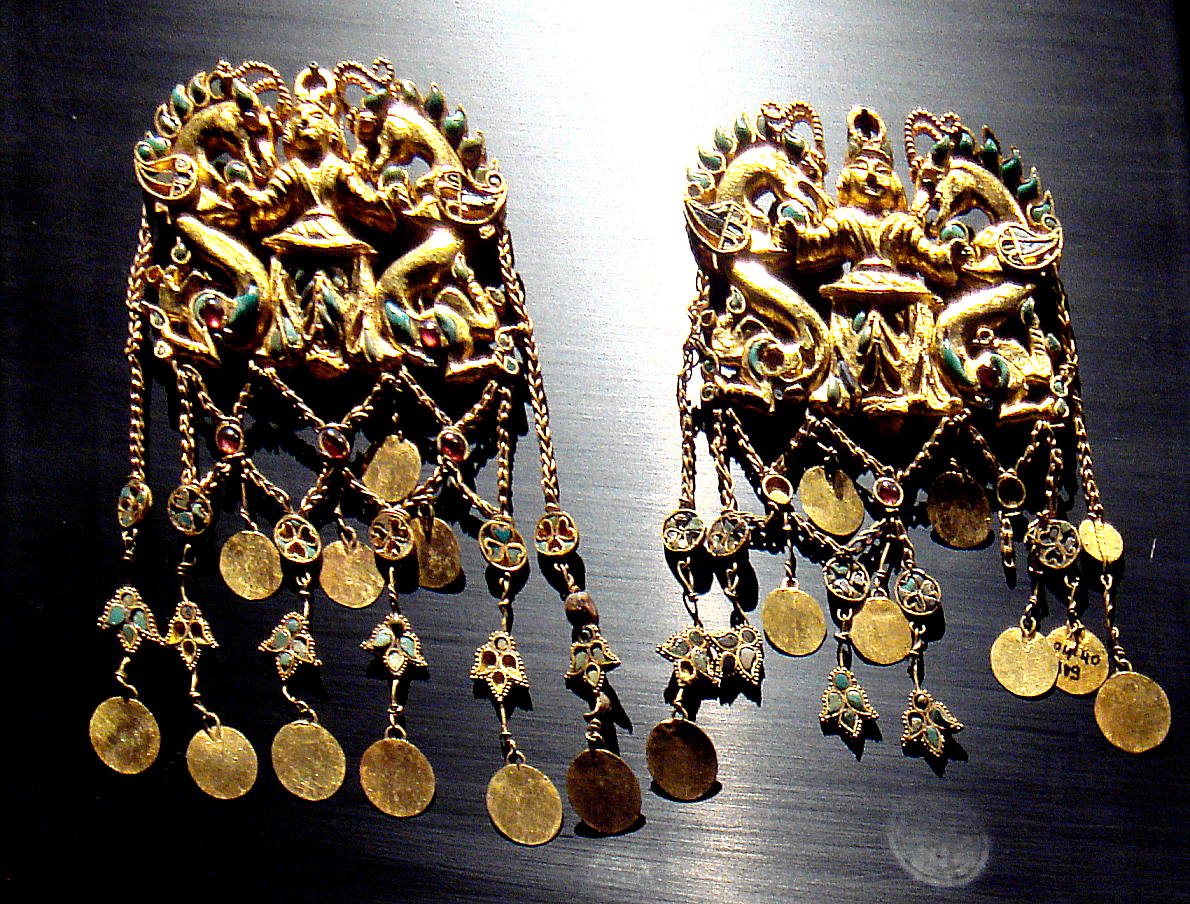
"Kings with dragons". Tomb II.

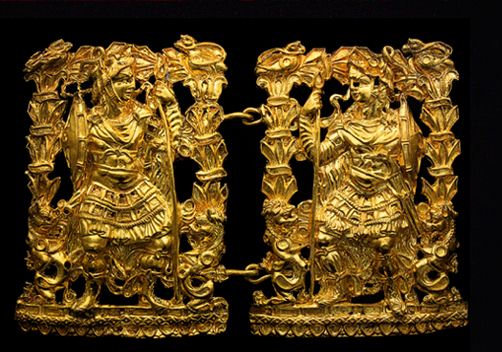
Men in armor, in Greek fighting gear. Tomb III.

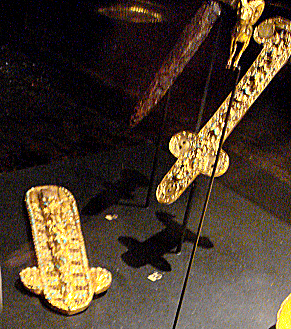
"Akinakes" polylobed decorated daggers. Tomb IV.

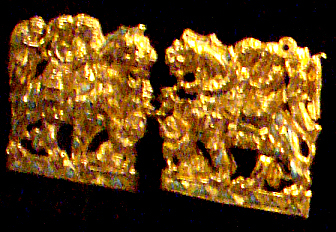
Dyonisos and Ariadne riding a lion. Tomb VI.

== Notes ==
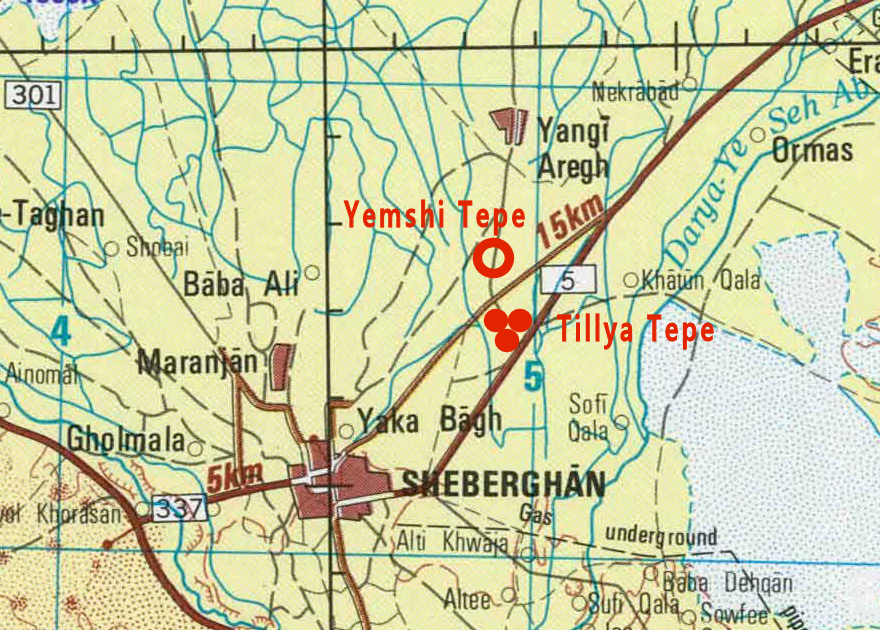
Circular fortress of Yemshi Tepe (to scale), and tumuli of Tillya Tepe, near Sheberghan.
