= Tillya Tepe Buddhist coin =

Ancient coin

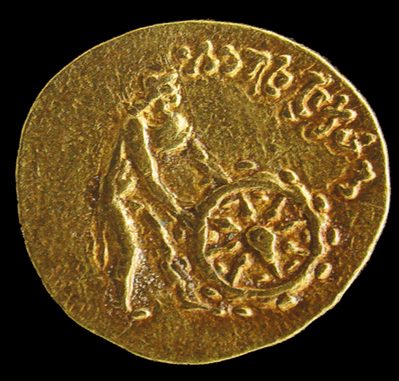
- Tillya Tepe gold coin at the Kabul Museum.
- Material: Gold
- Size: Height: Width:
- Writing: Obverse: Kharoshthi legend Dharmacakrapravata[ko] "The one who turned the Wheel of the Law". Reverse: Kharoshthi legend Sih[o] vigatabhay[o] "The lion who dispelled fear".
- Period/culture: 1st century BC - 1st century AD
- Place: Tillya Tepe, Afghanistan
- Present location: Kabul Museum, Afghanistan

The Tillya Tepe Buddhist coin is a gold coin that was discovered at the archaeological site of Tillya Tepe in modern Afghanistan.

The gold coin from India was found in tomb IV (the male warrior). The archaeological site, as the coin, are dated to the beginning of the first century AD, that is late 1st century BC to early 1st century AD.

== Background ==
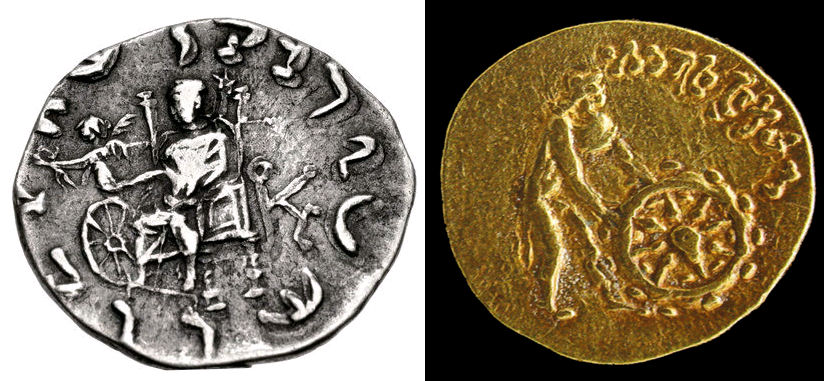
A coin of Indo-Greek king Menander II (left, circa 90–85 BC), in which Zeus, through Nike, hands a wreath of victory to a Wheel of the Law.

The coin was found in Afghanistan's Jowzjan Province, possibly the site of an early Indo-Iranian settlement. It was used as a necropolis for a wealthy family during the early Kushan period.

Since the time of the Buddha, Buddhist representations had been aniconic. This raises the possibility that this coin is one of the earliest, if not the earliest, representation of the Buddha.

Earlier connections between Greek deities and Buddhist symbolism appears on the coins of Indo-Greek kings such as Menander II (90–85 BC), in which Zeus, through Nike, can be seen handing a wreath of victory to a Wheel of the Law. Like other pieces found at Tilya Tepe, there is a mix of Western Hellenistic style with Gangetic and northwest Indian elements.

The coin is assumed to be destroyed or melted down by the Taliban in March 2001.

== Ideography ==
The ideography is the same as a plaster emblemata from Begram that depicts Heracles. Scholars have said the "representation seems to refer to the Vajrapani theme, which symbolizes the power of the Buddhist doctrine and tuition in Gandaharan art".

== Iconography ==
=== Obverse ===
On the obverse can be seen a man who is almost naked rolling a wheel. The legend in Kharoshthi reads Dharmacakrapravata[ko] "The one who turned the Wheel of the Law". He is wearing a Hellenistic-style chlamys and a petasus hat (an iconography similar to that of Hermes/ Mercury). Various identities have been suggested for the being depicted on the coins, from Shiva to Zeus, and most often, the Buddha himself in an early representation.

Hermes was considered in ancient Greece as a psychopomp, an intercessor between mortals and the divine, and conductor of souls into the afterlife. Besides similarities in metaphysical roles, the similarity between the names of their respective mothers, Maya for the Buddha and Maia for Hermes, have often been noted, as well as the stories of their miraculous births.

=== Reverse ===
On the reverse, it depicts a lion with the Buddhist symbol of the triratna, with the Kharoshthi legend Sih[o] vigatabhay[o] "The lion who dispelled fear".
