= Sheberghan Airport =

Airport in Afghanistan

Sheberghan Airport د شبرغان هوائی ډګر
- IATA: none; ICAO: OASG

Summary
- Airport type: Domestic
- Owner: Islamic Emirate of Afghanistan
- Operator: Ministry of Transport and Civil Aviation
- Location: Sheberghan, Afghanistan
- Elevation AMSL: 1,100 ft / 335 m
- Coordinates: 36°45′4.7″N 65°54′45.3″E

Map
- Location of airport in Afghanistan

Runways
| Direction | Length | | Surface |
| Direction | ft | m | Surface |
|---|---|---|---|
| 06L/24R | 8,600 | 2,621 | Asphalt |
| 06R/24L | 6,939 | 2,115 | Gravel |
- Sources: Landings.com

Sheberghan Airport (ICAO: OASG) is a domestic airport in northern Afghanistan. It is located around 17 NM (31 km) northeast of Sheberghan, which is the capital of Jowzjan Province. The city of Aqcha is 12 NM (22 km) to the northeast of the airport and Andkhoy is 40 NM (74 km) to the northwest.

== Facilities ==
The airport is next to a river at an elevation of around 1,100 ft (335 m) above sea level. It has one runway: 06L/24R with an asphalt surface measuring 8,600 ft × 80 ft (2,621 m × 24 m).

== See also ==
- List of airports in Afghanistan
