= Sari Pul River =

River in Afghanistan

The Sari Pul River is a river in northern Afghanistan originating in southwestern Sar-e Pol Province. It flows north and is joined by a major tributary from the east just south of the provincial capital, Sar-e Pol. It continues north past the town of Sar-e Pol and into Jowzjan Province. It flows past Sheberghan into the edge of the Karakum Desert where it dries up. In prehistoric times, its flow used to reach the Amu Darya.

There are irrigation canals that spread the water out around Sheberghan.
