= Alorus =

Coordinates: 40°33′18″N 22°29′40″E

Alorus or Aloros (Ancient Greek: Ἄλωρος) was a town of ancient Macedonia in the district Bottiaea, placed by Stephanus of Byzantium in the innermost recess of the Thermaic Gulf. According to the Periplus of Pseudo-Scylax it was situated between the Haliacmon and Lydias. The town is chiefly known on account of its being the birthplace of Ptolemy, who usurped the Macedonian throne after the murder of Alexander II of Macedon, son of Amyntas, and who is usually called Ptolemaeus Alorites. It was also the birthplace of Pantauchus, the general of Alexander the Great.

It is located near the modern Kypseli.
