= Balkh River =

Tributary of the Amu Darya in Afghanistan

Coordinates: 36°39′N 66°56′E

The Balkh River (Persian: دریای بلخاب; Pashto: د بلخ سیند) or Balkhab, also known in its upper reaches as the Band-e Amir River, is a river in northern Afghanistan.

The river rises in the Band-e Amir lakes in Bamyan Province in the Hindu Kush. The river flows west, then north, and terminates in irrigation canals in the area of the cities of Balkh and Mazar-e Sharif or in the desert. In times of exceptional flood the river drains into the lowlands of Turkmenistan. In ancient times the river terminated in a delta at the Amu Darya, but has not reached that river since irrigation canals were developed centuries ago.
