= Timeline of the release and transfer of Guantanamo Bay detainees =

In late 2008, the Department of Defense published a list of the Guantanamo captives who died in custody, were freed, or were repatriated to the custody of another country. The list was drafted on October 8, 2008, and was published on November 26, 2008. Subsequently almost two hundred more captives have been released or transferred, and several more have died in custody.

== Consolidated list of October 2008 ==
Consolidated chronological listing of GTMO detainees released, transferred or deceased
ISN	Nationality	Name	Inprocess date	Departure date	Transfer type
00009	SAU	Himdy Yasser	2002-02-12	2002-04-05	
00356	AFG	Abdul Razaq (Guantanamo captive 356)	2002-01-21	2002-09-15	
00107	AFG	Joh Mohammad Barakzai	2002-01-17	2002-10-28	
00143	PAK	Mohammad Sanghir	2002-01-18	2002-10-28	
00349	AFG	Mohammed Sadiq	2002-05-05	2002-10-28	
00657	AFG	Hajji Faiz Mohammed	2002-06-16	2002-10-28	
00119	AFG	Solaiman Dur Mohammed Shah		2003-03-23	
00313	AFG	Sharghulab Mirmuhammad		2003-03-23	
00314	AFG	Ezat Khan	2002-01-26	2003-03-23	
00315	AFG	Yarass Ali Must		2003-03-23	
00350	AFG	Ehsanullah (Guantanamo captive 350)	2002-06-10	2003-03-23	
00355	AFG	Nassir Malang	2002-06-12	2003-03-23	
00358	AFG	Mohammed Sargidene	2002-06-12	2003-03-23	
00360	AFG	Abdullah Edmondada	2002-06-12	2003-03-23	
00361	AFG	Murtazah Abdul Rahman		2003-03-23	
00362	AFG	Shaibjan Torjan		2003-03-23	
00363	AFG	Shai Jahn Ghafoor	2002-06-12	2003-03-23	
00638	AFG	Badshah Wali	2002-06-16	2003-03-23	
00640	AFG	Neyaz Walijan	2002-06-16	2003-03-23	
00644	AFG	Mirza Mohammed	2002-06-10	2003-03-23	
00645	AFG	Mohamed Kabel	2002-03-29	2003-03-23	
00658	AFG	Bismillah (Guantanamo captive 658)	2002-06-14	2003-03-23	
00671	AFG	Said Abasin	2002-07-15	2003-03-23	
00673	AFG	Alif Khan	2002-06-14	2003-03-23	
00012	PAK	Shabidzada Usman	2002-01-12	2003-05-09	
00019	PAK	Sha Mohammed Alikhel	2002-01-15	2003-05-09	
00364	AFG	Mohammed Raz-Mohammed Kakar	2002-06-12	2003-05-09	
00367	AFG	Mohammed Yusif Yaqub	2002-06-16	2003-05-09	
00444	PAK	Jihan Wali	2002-06-12	2003-05-09	
00517	AFG	Sultan Mohammed	2002-06-12	2003-05-09	
00520	AFG	Abdul Karim (Guantanamo detainee 520)	2002-06-12	2003-05-09	
00523	AFG	Ehsanullah (Guantanamo captive 523)	2002-06-14	2003-05-09	
00531	AFG	Abdul Hanan	2002-06-08	2003-05-09	
00628	AFG	Nematullah Sahib-Khan Alizai	2002-06-10	2003-05-09	
00629	AFG	Mahngur Alikhan	2002-06-16	2003-05-09	
00632	AFG	Rostum Akhtar Mohammed	2002-06-16	2003-05-09	
00643	AFG	Mohammed Tahir (Guantanamo detainee 643)	2002-06-10	2003-05-09	
00071	SAU	Mish'al Muhammad Rashid Al-Shedocky	2002-01-20	2003-05-14	
00080	SAU	Fahd Abdallah Ibrahim Al-Shabani	2002-02-08	2003-05-14	
00125	SAU	Fawaz Abd Al-Aziz Al-Zahrani	2002-02-13	2003-05-14	
00127	SAU	Ibrahim Rushdan Brayk Al-Shili	2002-02-14	2003-05-14	
00585	SAU	Ibrahim Umar Ali Al-Umar	2002-06-16	2003-05-14	
00056	MOR	Abdullah Tabarak Ahmad	2002-01-17	2003-07-01	
00663	EGY	Fael Roda Al-Waleeli	2002-06-07	2003-07-01	
00016	PAK	Jamal Muhammad Al-Deen	2002-01-14	2003-07-16	
00021	PAK	Salah Hudin	2002-01-21	2003-07-16	
00047	AFG	Asad Ullah	2002-01-17	2003-07-16	
00097	PAK	Tariq Khan	2002-06-16	2003-07-16	
00099	PAK	Abdul Raziq	2002-06-16	2003-07-16	
00106	AFG	Mohammed Raz	2002-02-10	2003-07-16	
00134	PAK	Ghaser Zaban Safollah	2002-01-17	2003-07-16	
00146	PAK	Mohammad Kashef Khan	2002-01-18	2003-07-16	
00210	PAK	Faik Iqbal		2003-07-16	
00303	PAK	Ali Ahmed (Guantanamo captive 303)		2003-07-16	
00304	PAK	Mohammed Ansar		2003-07-16	
00316	AFG	Ghuladkhan		2003-07-16	
00347	AFG	Mohammadullah	2002-06-14	2003-07-16	
00353	AFG	Abdul Waheed (Guantanamo captive 353)	2002-06-12	2003-07-16	
00365	AFG	Sabit Layar	2002-06-12	2003-07-16	
00442	PAK	Abdul Mowla LNU	2002-06-12	2003-07-16	
00512	AFG	Mahmud Sadik	2002-06-10	2003-07-16	
00545	PAK	Sajin Urayman	2002-06-12	2003-07-16	
00580	AFG	Noor Ahmad	2002-06-16	2003-07-16	
00582	AFG	Abdul Rahman Noorani	2002-06-16	2003-07-16	
00626	AFG	Noor Habib Ullah	2002-06-10	2003-07-16	
00630	AFG	Nisar Rahmad	2002-06-16	2003-07-16	
00633	AFG	Mohammed Nayim Farouq	2002-06-18	2003-07-16	
00635	AFG	Mohammad Akhbar	2002-06-18	2003-07-16	
00636	AFG	Nathi Ghul	2002-06-18	2003-07-16	
00646	AFG	Azizullah Asekzai	2002-06-10	2003-07-16	
00667	AFG	Kari Mohammed Sarwar	2002-06-14	2003-07-16	
00020	PAK	Mohammed Ishaq	2002-01-15	2003-11-18	
00124	AFG	Janan Taus Khan	2002-01-17	2003-11-18	
00135	PAK	Ejaz Ahmad Khan	2002-06-12	2003-11-18	
00139	PAK	Hafice Leqeat Manzu	2002-01-17	2003-11-18	
00291	TUR	Yuksel Celik Gogus		2003-11-18	
00297	TUR	Ibrahim Shafir Sen		2003-11-18	
00352	AFG	Abdul Hadi Muhamed Rasul Sayed	2002-06-12	2003-11-18	
00354	AFG	Nabu Abdul Ghani	2002-06-16	2003-11-18	
00443	AFG	Juma Khan (Guantanamo detainee 443)	2002-05-03	2003-11-18	
00518	AFG	Akah Khirullah	2002-05-03	2003-11-18	
00624	PAK	Majid Mehmood	2002-06-12	2003-11-18	
00637	AFG	FNU Insanullah	2002-06-16	2003-11-18	
00642	AFG	FNU Hamidullah (Guantanamo captive 642)	2002-06-16	2003-11-18	
00656	AFG	Abdul Baqi	2002-06-14	2003-11-18	
00666	AFG	FNU Hezbullah (Guantanamo captive 666)	2002-06-14	2003-11-18	
00677	AFG	Wazir Zalim Ghul	2002-06-14	2003-11-18	
00711	JOR	Hassan Khalil Mohamoud Abdul Hamid	2002-08-05	2003-11-18	
00820	AFG	Hajji Mohammed Yousef (Guantanamo captive 820)	2002-10-28	2003-11-18	
00830	PAK	Tila Mohammed Khan	2002-10-28	2003-11-18	
00990	CAN	Abdul Khadr		2003-11-18	
00085	PAK	Munir Bin Naseer		2003-11-30	
00136	PAK	Tarik Mohammad	2002-01-15	2003-11-30	
00169	JOR	Ayman Mohammad Silman Al Amrani	2002-02-13	2003-11-30	
00912	AFG	Asad Ullah (Guantanamo captive 912)	2003-03-23	2004-01-28	
00913	AFG	Ullah Naqib	2003-02-07	2004-01-28	
00930	AFG	Mohammed Ismail	2003-02-07	2004-01-28	
00267	SPA	Ahmad Abd Al Rahman Ahmad	2002-02-14	2004-02-13	
00323	DAN	Slimane Hadj Abderrahmane	2002-02-10	2004-02-24	
00082	RUS	Abdullah D. Kafkas		2004-02-27	
00203	RUS	Ravil Shafeyavich Gumarov	2002-01-21	2004-02-27	
00209	RUS	Almasm Rabilavich Sharipov	2002-01-21	2004-02-27	
00211	RUS	Ruslan Anatolivich Odijev	2002-06-14	2004-02-27	
00492	RUS	Aiat Nasimovich Vahitov	2002-06-14	2004-02-27	
00573	RUS	Rustam Akhmyarov	2002-05-01	2004-02-27	
00674	RUS	Timur Ravilich Ishmurat	2002-06-14	2004-02-27	
00086	UK	Shafiq Rasul	2002-01-14	2004-03-09	
00087	UK	Asif Iqbal (Guantanamo captive 87)	2002-01-14	2004-03-09	
00110	UK	Rhuhel Ahmed	2002-02-11	2004-03-09	
00490	UK	Jamal Malik Al Harith	2002-02-11	2004-03-09	
00534	UK	Tarek Dergoul	2002-05-05	2004-03-09	
00092	AFG	Said Mohammed Alim Shah	2002-02-07	2004-03-14	
00104	AFG	Hajji Mohammed Khan Achezkai	2002-02-10	2004-03-14	
00116	AFG	Yamatolah Abulwance	2002-01-17	2004-03-14	
00348	AFG	Aziz Khan Ali Khan Zumarikourt	2002-05-03	2004-03-14	
00351	AFG	Abdullah Ghofoor	2002-06-10	2004-03-14	
00366	AFG	Hazrat Sangin Khan	2002-05-03	2004-03-14	
00453	AFG	Mohammad Nasim	2002-06-16	2004-03-14	
00454	UZB	Mohammed Sadiq Adam	2002-02-07	2004-03-14	
00456	AFG	FNU Hamdullah (Guantanamo captive 456)	2002-06-12	2004-03-14	
00515	PAK	Israr Ul Haq	2002-06-12	2004-03-14	
00525	AFG	Ataullah Adam Gul	2002-06-16	2004-03-14	
00538	AFG	Amanullah Alikozi	2002-06-10	2004-03-14	
00542	PAK	Mohammad Abas	2002-06-16	2004-03-14	
00634	PAK	Ali Mohammed (Guantanamo captive 634)	2002-06-16	2004-03-14	
00639	AFG	Bismillah (Guantanamo captive 639)	2002-06-12	2004-03-14	
00668	AFG	Abdul Al-Hameed Mohammed Andarr	2002-06-14	2004-03-14	
00818	AFG	Osman Khan	2002-10-28	2004-03-14	
00822	AFG	Noor Aslaam	2002-10-28	2004-03-14	
00856	AFG	FNU Barak (Guantanamo captive 856)	2002-10-28	2004-03-14	
00896	AFG	Bar Far Huddine	2003-06-22	2004-03-14	
00897	AFG	Abdul Rahim (Guantanamo captive 897)	2003-02-07	2004-03-14	
00898	AFG	Zakim Shah	2003-03-23	2004-03-14	
00908	AFG	Peta Muhammed	2003-02-07	2004-03-14	
00969	AFG	Akhtar Mohammad (Guantanamo captive 969)	2003-05-09	2004-03-14	
00996	AFG	Hajji Mohammed Wazir	2003-05-09	2004-03-14	
00998	AFG	Mirwais Hasan	2003-05-09	2004-03-14	
00500	TMN	Emdash Abdullah Turkash	2002-06-18	2004-03-31	
00543	TUR	Mahmud Nuri Mart	2002-02-15	2004-03-31	
00563	IRQ	Sohab Mahud Mohhamed	2002-05-05	2004-03-31	
00623	IRN	Bakhtiar Bamari	2002-06-18	2004-03-31	
00648	IRQ	Haydar Jabbar Hafez Al Tamini		2004-03-31	
00665	TAJ	Sadee Eideov LNU	2002-06-14	2004-03-31	
00700	SUD	Muhammed Al Ghazali Babaker Majoub	2002-08-05	2004-03-31	
00714	SUD	Al Rachid Hasan Ahmad Abdul Raheem	2002-08-05	2004-03-31	
00715	PAL	Abdul Qadir Yousef Husseini	2002-08-05	2004-03-31	
00726	SYR	Menhal Al Henali	2002-08-05	2004-03-31	
00729	TAJ	Moyuballah Homaro	2002-08-05	2004-03-31	
00731	TAJ	FNU Mazharudin	2002-08-05	2004-03-31	
00732	TAJ	Shirinov Ghafar Homarovich	2002-08-05	2004-03-31	
01014	YEM	Walid Mohammed Shahir	2003-05-09	2004-03-31	
01018	JOR	Osam Abdul Rahan Ahmad	2003-05-09	2004-03-31	
00166	SWE	Mehdir Mohammad Ghezali	2002-01-17	2004-07-08	
00083	TAJ	Yusef Nabied	2002-02-08	2004-07-17	
00641	TAJ	Abdul Karim Irgashive	2002-06-08	2004-07-17	
00161	FRA	Mourad Benchellali	2002-01-17	2004-07-26	
00164	FRA	Imad Achab Kanouni	2002-02-12	2004-07-26	
00325	FRA	Nizar Sassi	2002-02-15	2004-07-26	
00371	FRA	Brahim Yadel	2002-01-21	2004-07-26	
00133	MOR	Mohammed Ibrahim Awzar	2002-01-20	2004-07-31	
00294	MOR	Mohammed Mizouz	2002-06-14	2004-07-31	
00499	MOR	Radwan Al Shakouri	2002-05-01	2004-07-31	
00587	MOR	Ibrahim Bin Shakaran	2002-05-03	2004-07-31	
00010	PAK	Abdul Sattar	2002-05-05	2004-09-17	
00011	PAK	Abdul Satar Nafeesi	2002-01-14	2004-09-17	
00014	PAK	Zafar Iqbal	2002-01-21	2004-09-17	
00017	PAK	Muhammed Ijaz Khan	2002-01-15	2004-09-17	
00018	PAK	Mohammed Sayed	2002-01-15	2004-09-17	
00023	PAK	Isa Khan (Guantanamo captive 23)	2002-01-21	2004-09-17	
00098	PAK	Hafiz Ihsan Saeed	2002-01-20	2004-09-17	
00100	PAK	Mohammed Ashraf	2002-05-05	2004-09-17	
00101	PAK	Mohammed Irfan (Guantanamo captive 101)	2002-02-09	2004-09-17	
00113	PAK	Sar Faraz Ahmed	2002-05-05	2004-09-17	
00137	PAK	Mohammed Tariq	2002-01-18	2004-09-18	
00138	PAK	Salahodin Ayubi	2002-01-18	2004-09-17	
00140	PAK	Said Saim Ali	2002-01-17	2004-09-17	
00141	PAK	Haseeb Ayub	2002-01-18	2004-09-17	
00142	PAK	FNU Fazaldad	2002-05-03	2004-09-17	
00144	PAK	Mohammad Ilyas (Guantanamo captive 144)	2002-01-17	2004-09-17	
00145	PAK	Hamood Ullah Khan	2002-01-15	2004-09-17	
00147	PAK	Mohammed Arshad Raza	2002-01-18	2004-09-17	
00247	PAK	Kay Fiyatullah	2002-06-12	2004-09-17	
00299	PAK	Abid Raza	2002-02-12	2004-09-17	
00300	PAK	Zahid Sultan	2002-02-07	2004-09-17	
00301	PAK	Khalil Rahman Hafez	2002-02-08	2004-09-17	
00302	PAK	Mohammed Ijaz	2002-02-11	2004-09-17	
00305	PAK	Hanif Mohammed	2002-02-17	2004-09-17	
00495	PAK	Mohammed Rafiq	2002-05-05	2004-09-17	
00504	PAK	Aminulla Amin	2002-05-03	2004-09-17	
00524	PAK	Mohammed Anwar	2002-05-03	2004-09-17	
00529	PAK	Bacha Khan (Guantanamo captive 529)	2002-06-16	2004-09-17	
00540	PAK	Mohammed Omar (Guantanamo captive 540)	2002-10-28	2004-09-17	
00541	PAK	Mohammed Noman	2002-06-16	2004-09-17	
00842	PAK	Sultan Ahmad	2003-02-07	2004-09-17	
00843	PAK	Saghir Ahmed	2003-02-07	2004-09-17	
01005	PAK	Bashir Ahmad	2003-05-09	2004-09-17	
01006	PAK	Mohammed Irfan (Guantanamo captive 1006)	2003-05-09	2004-09-17	
01011	PAK	Mohammed Akbar	2003-05-09	2004-09-17	
00527	AFG	Mohamman Daoud	2002-06-12	2004-09-18	
00530	AFG	Dawd Gul	2002-06-10	2004-09-18	
00539	AFG	Noor Allah	2002-05-05	2004-09-18	
00547	AFG	Wali Mohammed (Guantanamo detainee 547)	2002-06-16	2004-09-18	
00559	AFG	Badruzzan Badr	2002-05-01	2004-09-18	
00699	AFG	Din Mohammed Farhad	2002-08-05	2004-09-18	
00910	AFG	Mohammed Khan (Guantanamo captive 910)	2003-11-28	2004-09-18	
00911	AFG	Abdul Samad (detainee)	2003-02-07	2004-09-18	
00931	AFG	Hajji Niam Kuchi	2003-03-23	2004-09-18	
00960	AFG	Bismaullah (Guantanamo captive 960)	2003-05-09	2004-09-18	
00970	AFG	Amanullah (Guantanamo detainee 970) LNU	2003-03-23	2004-09-18	
00205	KUW	Nasir Najr Nasir Balud Al Mutayri	2002-02-07	2005-01-16	
00024	UK	Feroz Abbasi	2002-01-12	2005-01-25	
00558	UK	Moazzam Begg	2003-02-07	2005-01-25	
00817	UK	Richard Belmar	2002-10-28	2005-01-25	
10007	UK	Martin Mubanga	2002-04-20	2005-01-25	
00661	AUS	Mamdouh Habib	2002-05-03	2005-01-17	
00173	FRA	Ridouane Khalid	2002-02-15	2005-03-07	
00236	FRA	Khaled Ben Mustafa	2002-02-13	2005-03-07	
00649	FRA	Mustaq Ali Patel	2002-06-16	2005-03-07	NLEC
00581	PAK	Abdur Sayed Rahaman	2002-06-16	2005-03-11	NLEC
00730	MAL	Ibrahim Fauzee	2002-08-05	2005-03-11	NLEC
01117	AFG	Jalil	2003-07-30	2005-03-11	NLEC
00298	TUR	Salih Uyar	2002-02-15	2005-04-18	NLEC
00357	AFG	Abdul Rahman (Guantanamo detainee 357)	2002-06-12	2005-04-18	NLEC
00457	AFG	Mohammad Gul	2003-02-07	2005-04-18	NLEC
00459	AFG	Gul Zaman	2003-02-07	2005-04-18	NLEC
00561	AFG	Abdul Rahim Muslimdost	2002-05-01	2005-04-18	NLEC
00631	AFG	Padsha Wazir	2002-06-16	2005-04-18	NLEC
00812	AFG	Qalandar Shah	2002-10-28	2005-04-18	NLEC
00834	AFG	Naqeebyllah Shaheen Shahwali Zair Mohammed	2002-10-28	2005-04-18	NLEC
00835	AFG	Rasool Shahwali Zair Mohammed Mohammed	2002-10-28	2005-04-18	NLEC
00929	AFG	Abdul Qudus	2003-02-07	2005-04-18	NLEC
00952	AFG	Shahzada (Guantanamo captive 952)	2003-03-23	2005-04-18	NLEC
00953	AFG	Hammdidullah	2003-03-23	2005-04-18	NLEC
00958	AFG	Mohammad Nasim (Guantanamo captive 958)	2003-05-09	2005-04-18	NLEC
00986	AFG	Kako Kandahari	2003-07-18	2005-04-18	NLEC
01013	AFG	Feda Ahmed	2003-05-09	2005-04-18	NLEC
01019	AFG	Nasibullah	2003-07-18	2005-04-18	NLEC
01041	AFG	Habib Noor	2003-11-24	2005-04-18	NLEC
01157	AFG	Hukumra Khan	2003-09-02	2005-04-18	NLEC
00270	BEG	Mosa Zi Zemmori	2002-02-15	2005-04-25	
00296	BEG	Mesut Sen	2002-02-15	2005-04-25	
00072	MOR	Lahcen Ikassrien	2002-02-08	2005-07-18	
00120	AFG	Habib Rasool	2002-05-03	2005-07-19	
00155	SAU	Khalid Sulayman Jaydh Al Hubayshi	2002-01-14	2005-07-19	
00207	SAU	Mishal Awad Sayaf Alhabri	2002-01-12	2005-07-19	
00248	SAU	Saleh Abdall Al Oshan	2002-01-21	2005-07-19	NLEC
00546	AFG	FNU Muhibullah (Guantanamo captive 546)	2002-05-05	2005-07-19	
00589	JOR	Khalid Mahomoud Abdul Wahab Al Asmr	2002-07-15	2005-07-19	NLEC
00712	SUD	Hammad Ali Amno Gadallah	2002-08-05	2005-07-19	NLEC
00208	TAJ	Maroof Saleemovich Salehove	2002-01-20	2005-08-19	NLEC
00586	YEM	Karam Khamis Sayd Khamsan	2002-05-01	2005-08-19	NLEC
00676	IRN	Mohamed Anwar Kurd	2002-06-12	2005-08-19	
00306	AFG	Abdul Salam Zaeef	2002-05-01	2005-09-11	
00287	EGY	Sami Abdul Aziz Salim Allaithy	2002-02-11	2005-09-30	NLEC
00217	KUW	Abd Al Aziz Sayer Uwain Al Shammeri	2002-02-10	2005-11-02	
00220	KUW	Abdallah al-Ajmi	2002-01-17	2005-11-02	
00229	KUW	Mohammed Fenaitel Mohamed Al Daihani	2002-05-03	2005-11-02	
00568	KUW	Adil Zamil al-Zamil	2002-05-03	2005-11-02	
00571	KUW	Saad Madhi Saad Howash Al Azmi	2002-05-01	2005-11-02	
00060	BAH	Adil Kamil al-Wadi	2002-01-17	2004-11-04	
00159	BAH	Abdulla Majid Al Naimi	2003-06-08	2005-11-04	
00181	SAU	Maji Afas Radhi Al Shimri	2002-01-15	2005-11-04	
00246	BAH	Salman Ebrahim Mohamed Ali Al Khalifa	2002-02-13	2005-11-04	
00075	MOR	Najib Mohammad Lahassimi	2002-02-07	2006-02-07	
00123	MOR	Muhammad Hussein Ali Hassan	2002-01-21	2006-02-07	
00237	MOR	Mohammed Souleimani Laalami	2002-02-08	2006-02-07	
00701	UGA	Jamal Abdullah Kiyemba	2002-10-28	2006-02-07	
00460	AFG	Khan Zaman	2002-06-16	2006-02-08	
00655	AFG	Khadai Dad	2002-06-14	2006-02-08	
00826	AFG	Abdul Salaam (Guantanamo detainee 826)	2002-10-28	2006-02-08	
00950	AFG	Abdullah Khan	2003-03-23	2006-02-08	
00963	AFG	Abdul Bagi	2004-01	2006-02-08	
00971	AFG	Kushky Yar	2003-05-09	2006-02-08	
01051	AFG	Sharbat (Guantanamo detainee 1051)	2003-11-23	2006-02-08	
00260	CHN	Ahmed Adil	2002-02-09	2006-05-05	NLEC
00276	CHN	Akhdar Qasem Basit	2002-06-10	2006-05-05	NLEC
00279	CHN	Mohammed Ayub	2002-06-10	2006-05-05	NLEC
00283	CHN	Abu Bakker Qassim	2002-06-10	2006-05-05	NLEC
00293	CHN	Adel Abdulhehim	2002-06-10	2006-05-05	NLEC
00064	SAU	Abdel Hadi Mohammed Badan Al Sebaii Sebaii	2002-02-13	2006-05-18	
00094	SAU	Ibrahim Daif Allah Neman Al Sehli	2002-02-12	2006-05-18	
00095	SAU	Abdul Rahman Uthman Ahmed	2002-02-12	2006-05-18	
00105	SAU	Adnan Muhammed Ali Al Saigh	2002-02-14	2006-05-18	
00157	SAU	Saed Khatem Al Malki	2002-01-17	2006-05-18	
00177	SAU	Fahd Salih Sulayman Al Jutayli	2002-02-09	2006-05-18	
00308	SAU	Adil al-Nusayri	2002-02-13	2006-05-18	
00319	SAU	Mohammed Jayed Sebai	2002-01-21	2006-05-18	
00339	SAU	Khalid Abdallah Abdel Rahman Al Morghi	2002-02-13	2006-05-18	
00343	SAU	Abdallah Ibrahim Al Rushaydan	2002-06-16	2006-05-18	
00346	SAU	Said Bezan Ashek Shayban	2002-02-14	2006-05-18	
00501	SAU	Nawwaf Fahd Humood Al-Otaibi	2002-05-05	2006-05-18	
00505	SAU	Khalid Rashid Ali Al-Murri	2002-05-01	2006-05-18	
00652	SAU	Abdullah Hamid Mohammed Al-Qahtani	2002-06-16	2006-05-18	
00664	SAU	Rashid Awad Rashid Al Uwaydah	2002-06-14	2006-05-18	
00093	SAU	Yasser Talal Al Zahrani	2002-01-21	2006-06-10	died in custody
00588	SAU	Mani Shaman Turki al-Habardi Al-Utaybi	2002-06-08	2006-06-10	died in custody
00693	YEM	Ali Abdullah Ahmed	2002-06-18	2006-06-10	died in custody
00058	SAU	Musa Abed Al Wahab	2002-01-17	2006-06-24	
00073	SAU	Yusif Khalil Abdallah Nur	2002-01-20	2006-06-24	
00096	SAU	Muhammad Surur Dakhilallah Al Utaybi	2002-01-18	2006-06-24	
00132	SAU	Abdul Salam Gaithan Mureef Al Shehry	2002-01-17	2006-06-24	
00184	SAU	Othman Ahmad Othman al-Ghamdi	2002-01-14	2006-06-24	
00191	SAU	Saleh Ali Jaid Al Khathami	2002-02-14	2006-06-24	
00264	SAU	Abdul Aziz Abdul Rahman Abdul Aziz Al Baddah	2002-02-10	2006-06-24	
00265	SAU	Tariqe Shallah Hassan Al Harbi	2002-02-12	2006-06-24	
00266	SAU	Abdallah Muhammad Salih Al Ghanimi	2002-02-12	2006-06-24	
00271	SAU	Ibrahim Muhammed Ibrahim Al Nasir	2002-02-15	2006-06-24	
00337	SAU	Sa ad Ibrahim Sa ad Al Bidna	2002-02-13	2006-06-24	
00338	SAU	Wasim (Guantanamo detainee 338)	2002-05-03	2006-06-24	
00344	SAU	Rashid Abd Al Muslih Qaid Al Qa'id	2002-02-14	2006-06-24	
00491	SAU	Siddeeq Noor Turkistani	2002-02-13	2006-06-24	NLEC
00061	TUR	Murat Kurnaz	2002-02-15	2006-08-24	
00494	AFG	Noorallah	2002-06-10	2006-08-25	
00562	AFG	Qari Hasan Ulla Peerzai	2002-06-14	2006-08-25	
00845	AFG	Akhtar Mohammed (Guantanamo detainee 845)	2003-02-07	2006-08-25	
01009	AFG	Nasrat Khan	2003-05-09	2006-08-25	
01056	AFG	Said Mohammed	2003-11-23	2006-08-25	
00065	KUW	Omar Rajab Amin	2002-01-12	2006-09-06	
00228	KUW	Abdullah Kamel Abdullah Kamel Al Kandari	2002-05-01	2006-09-06	
00015	PAK	Zia Ul Shah	2002-01-14	2006-10-11	
00160	MOR	Mohamed Ben Moujane	2002-01-15	2006-10-11	
00227	BAH	Salah Abdul Rasool Al Blooshi	2002-05-01	2006-10-11	
00458	AFG	Abib Sarajuddin	2003-02-07	2006-10-11	
00555	IRN	Abdul Majid Muhammed	2002-05-05	2006-10-11	
00591	AFG	Qari Esmhatulla	2002-06-10	2006-10-11	
00783	AFG	Shamsullah	2002-10-28	2006-10-11	
00831	AFG	Khandan Kadir	2003-02-07	2006-10-11	
00849	AFG	Mohammed Nassim	2002-10-28	2006-10-11	
00902	AFG	Taj Mohammed (Guantanamo detainee 902)	2003-02-07	2006-10-11	
00907	AFG	Habib Rahman	2003-02-07	2006-10-11	
00909	AFG	Mohabet Khan	2003-02-07	2006-10-11	
00914	AFG	Shardar Khan	2003-02-07	2006-10-11	
00919	AFG	Faizullah (Guantanamo captive 919)	2003-02-07	2006-10-11	
00933	AFG	Swar Khan	2003-03-23	2006-10-11	
00948	AFG	Anwar Khan (Guantanamo detainee 948)	2003-03-23	2006-10-11	
01007	PAK	Abdul Halim Sadiqi	2003-05-09	2006-10-11	
01035	AFG	Sada Jan	2003-11-23	2006-10-11	
01074	AFG	Mohammed Aman	2003-11-23	2006-10-11	
01154	AFG	Ali Shah Mousavi	2003-11-23	2006-10-11	
00672	RUS	Zakirjan Asam	2002-06-08	2006-11-17	NLEC
00716	EGY	Alla Muhammed Saleem	2002-08-05	2006-11-17	NLEC
00718	ALG	Fethi Boucetta	2002-08-05	2006-11-17	NLEC
00055	SAU	Muhammed Yahia Mosin Al Zayla	2002-01-12	2006-12-13	
00057	SAU	Salim Suliman Al Harbi	2002-01-17	2006-12-13	
00109	SAU	Yusef Abdullah Saleh Al Rabiesh	2002-01-16	2006-12-13	
00121	SAU	Salman Saad Al Khadi Mohammed	2002-01-20	2006-12-13	
00188	SAU	Jabir Jubran Al Fayfi	2002-01-18	2006-12-13	
00192	SAU	Ibrahimj Sulayman Muhammad Arbaysh	2002-01-17	2006-12-13	
00206	SAU	Abdullah Muhammed Abdel Aziz	2002-01-12	2006-12-13	
00226	SAU	Anwar Hamdan Muhammed Al-Noor	2002-02-10	2006-12-13	
00245	SAU	Salah Abdul Rasul Ali Abdul Al-Balushi	2002-02-11	2006-12-13	
00273	SAU	Abd Al Aziz Muhammad Ibrahim Al Nasir	2002-01-17	2006-12-13	
00286	SAU	Ziad Said Farg Jahdari	2002-02-11	2006-12-13	
00336	SAU	Majed Hamad Al Frih	2002-02-12	2006-12-13	
00340	SAU	Bessam Muhammed Saleh Al Dubaikey	2002-06-08	2006-12-13	
00341	SAU	Said Ali Abdullah Al Farha Al Ghamidi	2002-02-13	2006-12-13	
00507	SAU	Sultan Sari Sayel Al Anazi	2002-06-12	2006-12-13	
00513	SAU	Abdul Rahman Khowlan	2002-02-11	2006-12-13	
00084	UZB	Ilkham Turdbyavich Batayev	2002-02-08	2006-12-15	
00118	AFG	Abdul Rahman Abdullah Mohamed Juma Kahm	2002-01-17	2006-12-15	
00129	YEM	Toufiq Saber Muhammad Al Marwa'i	2002-06-12	2006-12-15	
00151	BGL	Mubarak Hussain Bin Abul Hashem	2002-01-17	2006-12-15	
00162	YEM	Ali Husayn Abdullah Al Tays	2002-02-09	2006-12-15	
00183	YEM	Issam Hamid Al Bin Ali Al Jayfi	2002-01-17	2006-12-15	
00193	YEM	Muhsin Muhammad Musheen Moqbill	2002-05-03	2006-12-15	
00194	LBY	Muhammad Abd Allah Mansur Al Futuri	2002-01-16	2006-12-15	
00198	YEM	Mohammed al-Asadi	2002-05-01	2006-12-15	
00503	YEM	Saleh Mohamed Al Zuba	2002-06-08	2006-12-15	
00526	KAZ	Yakub Abahanov	2002-05-03	2006-12-15	
00528	KAZ	Abdallah Tohtasinovich Magrupov	2002-06-18	2006-12-15	
00949	AFG	Abdul Zahor	2003-03-23	2006-12-15	
00964	AFG	Rahmatullah	2003-05-09	2006-12-15	
00965	AFG	Hafizullah	2003-05-09	2006-12-15	
00966	AFG	Baridad	2003-05-09	2006-12-15	
00972	AFG	Alif Mohammed	2003-05-09	2006-12-15	
01036	AFG	Akhtiar Mohammad (Guantanamo detainee 1036)	2003-06-18	2006-12-15	
00025	SAU	Majeed Abdullah Al Joudi	2002-01-21	2007-02-20	
00158	SAU	Majid Abdallah Husayn Muhammad Al Samluli Al Harbi	2002-02-09	2007-02-20	
00176	SAU	Majid Aydha Muhammad Al Qurayshi	2002-02-14	2007-02-20	
00186	SAU	Rashed Awad Khalaf Balkhair	2002-01-17	2007-02-20	
00437	SAU	Faisal Satta Al Nasir	2002-01-20	2007-02-20	
00497	SAU	Nasir Maziyad Abdallah Al Qurayshi Al Subii	2002-02-07	2007-02-20	
00536	SAU	Mohammed Abdullah Ahmed	2002-06-08	2007-02-20	
00076	TAJ	Rummedin Fayziddinovich Sharpov	2002-01-15	2007-02-28	
00077	TAJ	Mehrabanb Fazrollah	2002-02-09	2007-02-28	
00090	TAJ	Tsabit Vokhidov	2002-01-15	2007-02-28	
00987	AFG	Ghalib Hassan	2003-07-18	2007-02-28	
01037	AFG	Nazargul Chaman	2003-07-18	2007-02-28	
00906	IRQ	Bisher Amin Khalil al-Rawi	2003-02-07	2007-03-30	
00590	MOR	Ahmed Rashidi	2002-06-14	2007-04-28	
01050	AFG	Azimullah	2003-11-23	2007-04-28	
00002	AUS	David Hicks	2002-01-12	2007-05-18	
00199	SAU	Abdul Rahman al-Amri	2002-02-09	2007-06-03	died in custody
00660	TUN	Lufti Bin Swei Lagha	2002-06-14	2007-06-17	
00721	TUN	Abdullah Bin Omar	2002-08-05	2007-06-17	
00069	YEM	Sadeq Muhammad Sa'id Ismail	2002-02-07	2007-06-18	
00221	YEM	Ali Mohsen Salih	2002-02-12	2007-06-18	
00225	YEM	Hani Abdul Muslih al Shulan	2002-02-10	2007-06-18	
00678	YEM	Fawaz Naman Hamoud Abdallah Mahdi	2002-06-18	2007-06-18	
00013	SAU	Fahed N. Mohammed	2002-01-12	2007-07-15	
00053	SAU	Saud Dakhil Allah Muslih Al Mahayawi	2002-01-16	2007-07-15	
00062	SAU	Muhamad Naji Subhi Al Juhani	2002-01-14	2007-07-15	
00066	SAU	Yahya Samil Al Suwaymil Al Sulami	2002-01-15	2007-07-15	
00122	SAU	Buad Thif Allah Al Atabi	2002-01-21	2007-07-15	
00154	SAU	Mazin Salih Musaid	2002-01-18	2007-07-15	
00179	SAU	Abdul Rahman Owaid Mohammad Al Juaid	2002-01-17	2007-07-15	
00182	SAU	Bandar Ahmad Mubarak Al Jabri	2002-01-15	2007-07-15	
00204	SAU	Said Ibrahim Ramzi Al Zahrani	2002-01-21	2007-07-15	
00214	SAU	Muhammad Abd Al Rahman Al Kurash	2002-01-17	2007-07-15	
00230	SAU	Humud Dakhil Humud Sa'id Al Jad'an	2002-02-11	2007-07-15	
00234	SAU	Khalid Mohammed Al-Zahrani	2002-02-11	2007-07-15	
00261	BAH	Juma Mohammed Abdul Latif Al Dossary	2002-01-16	2007-07-15	
00332	SAU	Abdullah Al Tayabi	2002-02-08	2007-07-15	
00370	SAU	Abd Al-Hizani	2002-02-07	2007-07-15	
00516	SAU	Ghanim Abdul Rahman Al Harbi	2002-05-03	2007-07-15	
00052	BAH	Isa Ali Abdulla Almurbati	2002-06-08	2007-08-07	
00532	AFG	Mohammed Sharif	2002-05-03	2007-08-07	
00848	AFG	Amin Ullah	2003-02-07	2007-08-07	
00943	AFG	Abdul Ghani (Guantanamo captive 943)	2003-05-09	2007-08-07	
01004	AFG	Mohammed Yacoub	2003-05-09	2007-08-07	
01043	AFG	Abdul Razak (Guantanamo captive 1043)	2003-11-23	2007-08-07	
00051	SAU	Majid Al Barayan	2002-02-09	2007-09-05	
00067	SAU	Abd Al Razzaq Abdallah Ibrahim Al Tamini	2002-01-18	2007-09-05	
00079	SAU	Fahed Al Harazi	2002-02-08	2007-09-05	
00112	SAU	Abdul Aziz Sa'ad Al-Khaldi	2002-01-14	2007-09-05	
00126	SAU	Salam Abdullah Said	2002-01-17	2007-09-05	
00196	SAU	Musa Ali Said Al Said Al Umari	2002-02-14	2007-09-05	
00218	SAU	Fahd Muhammed Abdullah Al Fouzan	2002-02-14	2007-09-05	
00231	SAU	Abdulhadi Abdallah Ibrahim Al Sharakh	2002-01-16	2007-09-05	
00274	SAU	Bader Al Bakri Al Samiri	2002-02-13	2007-09-05	
00318	SAU	Rami Bin Said Al Taibi	2002-02-13	2007-09-05	
00322	SAU	Khalid Hassan Husayn Al Barakat	2002-02-12	2007-09-05	
00342	SAU	Mohammed Mubarek Salah Al Qurbi	2002-02-12	2007-09-05	
00368	SAU	Umran Bakr Muhammad Hawsawi	2002-01-21	2007-09-05	
00493	SAU	Abdul Hakim Bukhary	2002-02-13	2007-09-05	
00514	SAU	Abdullah T. Al Anzy	2002-02-07	2007-09-05	
00647	SAU	Mustaq Ali Patel	2002-06-08	2007-09-05	
00706	MAU	Mohammad Lameen Sidi Mohammad	2002-08-05	2007-09-26	
00172	YEM	Ali Muhammed Nasir Mohammed	2002-01-15	2007-09-28	
00557	Libya	Abu Sufian bin Qumu	2002-05-05	2007-09-28	
00801	AFG	Sabar Lal Melma	2002-10-28	2007-09-28	
00941	AFG	Juma Din	2003-03-23	2007-09-28	
00945	AFG	Said Amir Jan	2003-05-09	2007-09-28	
00951	AFG	Nasrullah (Guantanamo detainee 951)	2003-03-23	2007-09-28	
00956	AFG	Abdul Ahmad	2003-05-09	2007-09-28	
00974	AFG	Muhebullah (Guantanamo detainee 974)	2003-03-23	2007-09-28	
00496	AFG	Fizaulla Rahman	2002-05-03	2007-11-02	
00651	JOR	Usama Hassan Ahmend Abu Kabir	2002-06-08	2007-11-02	
00662	JOR	Ahmed Hassan Jamil Suleyman	2002-06-08	2007-11-02	
00670	AFG	Abdullah Hekmat	2002-05-03	2007-11-02	
00761	Libya	Ibrahim Mahdy Achmed Zeidan	2002-08-05	2007-11-02	
00874	AFG	Abdul Nasir (Guantanamo captive 874)	2003-02-07	2007-11-02	
00955	AFG	Mohammed Quasam	2003-03-23	2007-11-02	
00967	AFG	Naserullah (Guantanamo detainee 967)	2003-05-09	2007-11-02	
00977	AFG	Hiztullah Yar Nasrat	2003-03-23	2007-11-02	
01003	AFG	Shabir Ahmed	2003-05-09	2007-11-02	
01010	AFG	Nahir Shah	2003-07-18	2007-11-02	
00050	JOR	Zaid Muhamamd Sa'id Al Husayn	2002-01-19	2007-11-09	
00059	SAU	Sultan Ahmed Dirdeer Musa Al Uwaydha	2002-01-17	2007-11-09	
00068	SAU	Khalid Saud Abd Al Rahman Al Bawardi	2002-01-15	2007-11-09	
00114	SAU	Yussef Mohammed Mubarak Al Shihri	2002-01-16	2007-11-09	
00130	SAU	Faha Sultan	2002-02-12	2007-11-09	
00185	SAU	Turki Mash Awi Zayid Al Asiri	2002-01-17	2007-11-09	
00187	SAU	Murtada Ali Said Maqram	2002-02-09	2007-11-09	
00215	SAU	Fahd Umr Abd Al Majid Al Sharif		2007-11-09	
00258	SAU	Nayif Abdallah Ibrahim Al Nukhaylan	2002-02-08	2007-11-09	
00262	SAU	Abdullah Abd Al Mu'in Al Wafti	2002-02-09	2007-11-09	
00333	SAU	Mohamed Atiq Awayd Al Harbi	2002-02-13	2007-11-09	
00372	SAU	Sa Id Ali Jabir Al Khathim Al Shihri	2002-01-21	2007-11-09	
00438	SAU	Hani Saiid Mohammad Al Khalif	2002-01-22	2007-11-09	
00650	SAU	Jabir Hasan Muhamed Al Qahtani	2002-06-12	2007-11-09	
00003	AFG	Gholam Ruhani	2002-01-12	2007-12-12	
00008	AFG	Abdullah Gulam Rasoul	2002-01-12	2007-12-12	
00108	AFG	Abdul Rauf Aliza	2002-02-10	2007-12-12	
00222	AFG	Umar Abdullah Al Kunduzi	2002-02-11	2007-12-12	
00923	AFG	Abdul Razzaq (Guantanamo detainee 923)	2003-02-07	2007-12-12	
00954	AFG	Abdul Ghafour (Guantanamo detainee 954)	2003-03-23	2007-12-12	
00976	AFG	Abdullah Wazir	2003-03-23	2007-12-12	
01001	AFG	Hafizullah Shabaz Khail	2003-05-09	2007-12-12	
01002	AFG	Abdul Mateen	2003-05-09	2007-12-12	
01012	AFG	Aminullah Baryalai Tukhi	2003-05-09	2007-12-12	
01021	AFG	Gul Chaman	2003-05-09	2007-12-12	
01032	AFG	Abdul Ghaffar (Guantanamo detainee 1032)	2003-06-08	2007-12-12	
01100	AFG	Abdullah Mujahid	2003-11-23	2007-12-12	
00710	SUD	Salim Mahmoud Adem Mohammed Bani Amir	2002-08-05	2007-12-12	
00940	SUD	Adel Hassan Hamad	2003-03-23	2007-12-12	
00905	JOR	Jamil al-Banna	2003-02-07	2007-12-19	
00727	Libya	Omar Deghayes	2002-08-05	2007-12-19	
00659	ALG	Sameur Abdenour	2002-06-16	2007-12-19	
00253	SAU	Faris Muslim Al Ansari		2007-12-28	
00005	SAU	Abdul Aziz Al Matrafi	2002-02-14	2007-12-28	
00243	SAU	Abdullah Ali Al Utaybi	2002-02-10	2007-12-28	
00216	SAU	Jamil Ali Al Kabi		2007-12-28	
00565	SAU	Abdul Hakim Abdul Rahman Abdulaziz Al Mousa	2002-05-03	2007-12-28	
00074	SAU	Mesh Arsad Al Rashid	2002-02-14	2007-12-28	
00272	SAU	Ziyad bin Salih bin Muhammad Al Bahooth	2002-02-14	2007-12-28	
00439	SAU	Khalid Malu Shia Al Ghatani	2002-01-20	2007-12-28	
00268	SAU	Abdul Rahman Nashi Badi Al Hataybi	2002-02-09	2007-12-28	
00436	SAU	Nayif Fahd Mutliq Al Usaymi	2002-02-14	2007-12-28	
00942	AFG	Abdul Razzak Hekmati	2003-03-23	2008-01-01	
00890	AFG	Rahmatullah Sangaryar	2003-03-23	2008-04-30	
00886	AFG	Nasrullah (Guantanamo detainee 886)	2003-03-23	2008-04-30	
00888	AFG	Esmatulla (Guantanamo detainee 888)	2003-02-07	2008-04-30	
00798	AFG	Sahib Rohullah Wakil	2003-03-23	2008-04-30	
00556	AFG	Abdullah Mohammad Khan	2002-02-15	2008-04-30	
00720	SUD	Mustafa Ibrahim Mustafa Al Hassan	2002-08-05	2008-04-30	
00345	SUD	Sami Mohy El Din Muhammed Al Hajj	2002-06-14	2008-04-30	
00081	SUD	Walid Mohammad Haj Mohammad Ali	2002-01-21	2008-04-30	
00150	MOR	Said Boujaadia	2002-02-07	2008-04-30	
00070	ALG	Abdul Raham Houari	2002-02-08	2008-07-02	
00705	ALG	Mustafa Ahmed Hamlily	2002-08-05	2008-07-02	
00048	UAE	Abdulah Alhamiri	2002-01-12	2008-07-26	
00334	Qatar	Jaralla Saleh Mohammed Kahla Al Marri	2002-02-11	2008-07-26	
01165	AFG	Mohammed Mussa Yakubi	2003-11-23	2008-07-26	
00284	ALG	Mohammed Abd Al Al Qadir	2002-01-21	2008-08-25	
00292	ALG	Abdulli Feghoul	2002-02-15	2008-08-25	
00961	AFG	Abdul Wahab	2003-05-09	2008-08-31	
01052	AFG	Mahbub Rahman	2003-11-23	2008-08-31	
00939	ALG	Mammar Ameur	2003-03-23	2008-10-06	
00719	SUD	Mustafa Ibrahim Mustafa Al Hassan	2002-08-05	2006-10-06	

== Changes since October 2008 ==
Captives transferred or released from Guantanamo since October 2008
ISN	Name	Nationality	Destination	Inprocess date	Departure date	Transfer type
00521	Abdulrahim Kerimbakiev	Kazakhstan	Kazakhstan	2002-06-18	2008-10-31	repatriated
01095	Zainulabidin Merozhev	Tajikistan	Tajikistan	unknown	2008-10-31	repatriated
00704	Muhamed Hussein Abdallah	Somalia	Somaliland	2002-08-05	2008-11-04	repatriated
00703	Ahmed bin Kadr Labed	Algeria	Algeria	2002-08-05	2008-11-10	repatriated
01016	Soufian Abar Huwari	Algeria	Algeria	2003-05-09	2008-11-10	repatriated
00149	Salim Ahmed Hamdan	Yemen	Yemen	2002-05-01	2008-11-25	serve out his sentence
10003	Mohammed Nechle	Bosnia	France	2002-01-20	2008-12-16	released
10004	Mustafa Ait Idr	Bosnia	France	2002-01-20	2008-12-16	released
10006	Boudella el Hajj	Bosnia	France	2002-01-20	2008-12-16	released
00111	Ali Abdul Motalib Awayd Hassan al Tayeea	Iraq	Iraq	2002-05-03	2009-01-17	
00175	Hassan Mujamma Rabai Said	Algeria	Algeria	2002-05-01	2009-01-17	
00435	Hassan Abdul Said	Iraq	Iraq	2002-05-05	2009-01-17	
00653	Arkan Mohammad Ghafil al Karim	Iraq	Iraq	2002-06-08	2009-01-17	
00758	Abbas Habid Rumi al Naely	Iraq	Iraq	2002-08-05	2009-01-17	
00968	Bismullah	Afghanistan	Afghanistan	2003-03-23	2009-01-17	release
01458	Binyam Mohamed	Ethiopia	United Kingdom	2004-09-20	2009-02-23	released
10002	Sabir Mahfouz Lahmar	Bosnia	France	2002-01-20	2009-05-15	released
10005	Lakhdar Boumediene	Bosnia	France	2002-01-20	2009-05-15	released
00078	Mohammad Ahmed Abdullah Saleh al Hanashi	Yemen		2002-02-08	2009-06-01	died in custody
10012	Ahmed Khalfan Ghailani	Tanzania	United States	2006-09-05	2009-06-09	transferred for trial
00433	Jawad Jabber Sadkhan	Iraq	Iraq	2002-05-03	2009-06-10	
00269	Mohammed El Gharani	Chad	Chad	2002-02-09	2009-06-11	repatriation
00278	Abdul Helil Mamut	China	Bermuda	2002-06-10	2009-06-11	release
00320	Huzaifa Parhat	China	Bermuda	2002-05-03	2009-06-11	release
00295	Emam Abdulahat	China	Bermuda	2002-06-14	2009-06-11	release
00285	Jalal Jalaladin	China	Bermuda	2002-06-12	2009-06-11	release
00335	Khalid Saad Mohammed	Saudi Arabia	Saudi Arabia	2002-02-12	2009-06-12	repatriation
00669	Ahmed Zaid Salim Zuhair	Saudi Arabia	Saudi Arabia	2002-06-14	2009-06-12	repatriation
00687	Abdalaziz Kareem Salim al Noofayaee	Saudi Arabia	Saudi Arabia	2002-06-16	2009-06-12	repatriation
00900	Mohamed Jawad	Afghanistan	Afghanistan	unknown	2009-08-24	release
00312	Muhammed Khan Tumani	Syria	Portugal	2002-02-11	2009-08-28	release
00317	Moammar Badawi Dokhan	Syria	Portugal	2002-02-12	2009-08-28	release
00692	Ali Bin Ali Aleh	Yemen	Yemen	2002-06-18	2009-09-26	release
00022	Shakhrukh Hamiduva	Uzbekistan	Ireland	2002-01-15	2009-09-27	release
00452	Oybek Jamoldinivich Jabbarov	Uzbekistan	Ireland	2002-06-16	2009-09-27	release
00213	Khalid Abdullah Mishal al Mutairi	Kuwait	Kuwait	2002-02-09	2009-10-13	release
00551	Fouad Mahmoud al Rabiah	Kuwait	Kuwait	2002-05-01	2009-10-13	release
00201	Ahmad Tourson	China	Palau	2002-01-21	2009-10-31	release
00281	Abdul Ghappar Abdul Rahman	China	Palau	2002-06-10	2009-10-31	release
00102	Edham Mamet	China	Palau	2002-01-20	2009-10-31	release
00250	Anwar Hassan	China	Palau	2002-02-07	2009-10-31	release
00289	Dawut Abdurehim	China	Palau	2002-06-12	2009-10-31	release
00584	Adel Noori	China	Palau	2002-05-05	2009-10-31	release
00148	Adel Ben Mabrouk	Tunisia	Italy	2002-02-09	2009-11-30	transfer for trial
00510	Riyad Bil Mohammed Tahir Nasseri	Tunisia	Italy	2002-06-08	2009-11-30	transfer for trial
00519	Mahrar Rafat Al Quwari	West Bank	Hungary	2002-06-14	2009-11-30	transfer
00032	Farouq Ali Ahmed	Yemen	Yemen	2002-01-15	2009-12-19	repatriation
00256	Riyad Atiq Ali Abdu al Haf	Yemen	Yemen	2002-06-12	2009-12-19	repatriation
00577	Jamal Alawi Mari	Yemen	Yemen	2002-05-01	2009-12-19	repatriation
00627	Ayman Batarfi	Yemen	Yemen	2002-05-01	2009-12-19	repatriation
00679	Muhammaed Yasir Ahmed Taher	Yemen	Yemen	2002-06-14	2009-12-19	repatriation
00683	Fayad Yahya Ahmed al Rami	Yemen	Yemen	2002-06-18	2009-12-19	repatriation
00850	Mohammed Hashim	Afghanistan	Afghanistan	2002-10-28	2009-12-19	repatriation
00944	Sharifullah	Afghanistan	Afghanistan	2003-03-23	2009-12-19	repatriation
01030	Abdul Hafiz	Afghanistan	Afghanistan	unknown	2009-12-19	repatriation
01104	Mohamed Rahim	Afghanistan	Afghanistan	2003-11-23	2009-12-19	repatriation
00567	Mohamed Suleiman Barre	Somalia	Somaliland	unknown	2009-12-19	repatriation
10027	Ismael Arale	Somalia	Somaliland	2007-05-??	2009-12-19	repatriation
00533	Hasan Zemiri	Algeria	Algeria	2002-05-01	2010-01-20	unknown
01452	Adil Hadi al Jazairi Bin Hamlili	Algeria	Algeria	unknown	2010-01-20	unknown
00892	Rafiq Bin Bashir Bin Jalud Al Hami	Tunisia	Slovakia	2003-02-07	2010-01-24	transfer
00103	Arkin Mahmud	China	Switzerland	2002-06-18	2010-02-04	release
00046	Salah Bin Al Hadi Asasi	Tunisia	Albania	2002-01-20	2010-02-24	release
00709	Abdul Rauf Omar Mohammed Abu Al Qusin	Libya	Albania	2002-08-05	2010-02-24	release
00277	Bahtiyar Mahnut	China	Switzerland	2002-06-10	2010-02-04	release
00049	Assem Matruq Mohammad al Aasmi	West Bank	Spain	2002-01-20	2010-02-24	transfer.
00654	Abdel Hamid al-Ghazzawi	Libya	Georgia	2002-06-18	2010-03-23	release
00717	Abdul Haddi Bin Hadiddi	Tunisia	Georgia	2002-08-05	2010-03-23	transfer
00252	Yasim Muhammed Basardah	Yemen	Spain	2002-02-12	2010-05-04	release
00330	Maasoum Abdah Mouhammad	Syria	Bulgaria	2002-06-10	2010-05-04	release
00681	Mohammed Odaini	Yemen	Yemen	2002-06-18	2010-07-13	release
00307	Abd Al Nasir Mohammed Abd Al Qadir Khantumani	Syria	Cape Verde	2002-02-11	2010-07-20	release
00744	Abdul Aziz Naji	Algeria	Algeria	2002-08-05	2010-07-20	release
00675	Kamalludin Kasimbekov	Uzbekistan	Latvia	2002-06-14	2010-07-22	release
00331	Ohmed Ahmed Mahamoud Al Shurfa	Saudi	Germany	2002-02-11	2010-09-16	release
00537	Mahmud Salem Horan Mohammed Mutlak Al Ali	Syria	Germany	unknown	2010-09-16	release
00219	Abdul Razakah	China	El Salvador	2002-06-08	2012-04-18	release
00328	Hammad Memet	China	El Salvador	2002-05-03	2012-04-18	release
00156	Adnan Farhan Abd Al Latif	Yemen		2002-01-17	2012-09-10	died in custody
00766	Omar Khadr	Canada	Canada	2002-10-28	2012-09-29	serve out his sentence
00757	Ahmed Ould Abdul Aziz	Mauritania	Mauritania	2002-08-05	2013-05-31	release
00760	Mohamedou Ould Slahi	Mauritania				released
00238	Nabil Hadjarab	Algeria	Algeria	2002-02-15	2013-08-28	released
00288	Mutij Sadiz Ahmad Sayab	Algeria	Algeria	2002-01-21	2013-08-28	released
00310	Djamel Saiid Ali Ameziane	Algeria	Algeria	2002-02-12	2013-12-05	released
10001	Bensayah Belkacem	Bosnia	Algeria	2002-01-21	2013-12-05	release
00200	Said Muhammad Husyan Qahtani	Saudi Arabia	Saudi Arabia	2002-02-16	2013-12-16	released
00574	Hamoud Abdullah Hamoud Hassan Al Wady	Saudi Arabia	Saudi Arabia	2002-06-08	2013-12-16	released
00036	Ibrahim Osman Ibrahim	Sudan	Sudan	2002-01-11	2013-12-18	release
00707	Mohammed Nour Osman	Sudan	Sudan	2002-08-05	2013-12-18	release
00275	Yusef Abbas	China	Slovakia	2002-06-08	2013-12-31	release
00280	Saidullah Khalik	China	Slovakia	2002-06-10	2013-12-31	release
00282	Hajiakbar Abdulghupur	China	Slovakia	2002-06-10	2013-12-31	release
00290	Ahmed Bin Saleh Bel Bacha	Algeria	Algeria	2002-02-09	2014-03-17	released
00004	Abdul Haq Wasiq	Afghanistan	Qatar	2002-01-11	2014-05-31	unclear
00006	Norullah Noori	Afghanistan	Qatar	2002-01-12	2014-05-31	unclear
00007	Mohammad Fazl	Afghanistan	Qatar	2002-01-12	2014-05-31	unclear
00579	Khirullah Said Wali Khairkhwa	Afghanistan	Qatar	2002-05-01	2014-05-31	unclear
00832	Mohammad Nabi Omari	Afghanistan	Qatar	2002-10-28	2014-05-31	unclear
00232	Fouzi Khalid Abdullah al Awda	Kuwait	Kuwait	2002-02-12	2014-11-05	repatriated
00506	Salah Mohammed Salih Al-Dhabi	Yemen	Georgia		2014-11-20	transferred
00686	Abdel Ghalib Ahmad Hakim	Yemen	Georgia	2002-06-18	2014-11-20	transferred
00553	Abdul Khaled Al-Baydani	Yemen	Georgia	2002-05-01	2014-11-20	transferred
00174	Hisham Bin Ali Bin Amor Sliti	Tunisia	Slovakia	2002-05-01	2014-11-20	transferred
01015	Husayn Salim Muhammad Al-Mutari Yafai	Yemen	Slovakia	2003-05-09	2014-11-20	transferred
00713	Muhammed Murdi Issa al Zahrani	Saudi Arabia	Saudi Arabia	2002-08-05	2014-11-22	transferred
00326	Ahmed Adnan Ahjam	Syria	Uruguay	2002-06-14	2014-12-08	granted refugee status
00327	Ali Hussein al-Shaaban	Syria	Uruguay	2002-06-14	2014-12-08	granted refugee status
00329	Abdelhadi Faraj	Syria	Uruguay	2002-06-08	2014-12-08	granted refugee status
00502	Abdul Bin Mohammed Abis Ourgy	Tunisia	Uruguay	2002-05-01	2014-12-08	granted refugee status
00684	Mohammed Taha Mattan	Syria	Uruguay	2002-06-18	2014-12-08	granted refugee status
00722	Abu Wa'el Dhiab	Syria	Uruguay	2002-08-05	2014-12-08	granted refugee status
00899	Shawali Khan	Afghanistan	Afghanistan	2003-02-07	2014-12-19	repatriated
00928	Khi Ali Gul	Afghanistan	Afghanistan	2003-03-23	2014-12-19	repatriated
00934	Abdul Ghani	Afghanistan	Afghanistan	2003-03-23	2014-12-19	repatriated
01103	Mohommod Zahir	Afghanistan	Afghanistan	2003-11-23	2014-12-19	repatriated
00152	Asim Thahit Abdullah al Khalaqi	Yemen	Kazakhstan	2002-01-17	2014-12-30	transferred
00168	Adel al-Hakeemy	Tunisia	Kazakhstan	unknown	2014-12-30	transferred
00254	Muhammad Ali Husayn Khanayna	Yemen	Kazakhstan	2002-06-08	2014-12-30	transferred
00570	Sabri Mohammed Ebrahim Al Qurashi	Yemen	Kazakhstan	2002-05-05	2014-12-30	transferred
00894	Lufti Bin Ali	Tunisia	Kazakhstan	2003-02-07	2014-12-30	transferred
00034	Al Khadr Abdallah Muhammed Al Yafi	Yemen	Oman	2002-01-17	2015-01-14	release
00224	Abd al Rahman Abdullah Ali Muhammad	Yemen	Oman	2002-02-09	2015-01-14	release
00259	Fadil Husayn Salih Hintif	Yemen	Oman	2002-02-09	2015-01-14	release
00689	Mohammed Ahmed Salam	Yemen	Oman	2002-06-18	2015-01-14	release
00690	Ahmed Abdul Qader	Yemen	Estonia	2002-06-18	2015-01-14	release
00035	Idris Ahmed Abdu Qader Idris Idris Ahmad 'Abd Al Qadir Idris	Yemen	Oman	2002-06-08	2015-06-13	transfer
00170	Sharaf Ahmad Muhammad Mas'ud Sharaf Ahmad Muhammad Masud	Yemen	Oman	2002-06-08	2015-06-13	transfer
00564	Jalal Salam Awad Awad Jalal Salam Bin Amer	Yemen	Oman	2002-06-14	2015-06-13	transfer
00575	Saa'd Nasser Moqbil Al Azani Saad Masir Mukbl Al Azani	Yemen	Oman	2002-06-18	2015-06-13	transfer
00680	Emad Abdallah Hassan Emad Abdalla Hassan	Yemen	Oman	2002-06-18	2015-06-13	transfer
00691	Muhammad Ali Salem Al Zarnuki Mohammed Ali Salem Al Zarnuki	Yemen	Oman	2002-06-18	2015-06-13	transfer
00197	Yunis Abdurrahman Shokuri	Morocco	Morocco	2002-05-01	2015-09-16	transfer
00042	Abdul Rahman Shalabi	Saudi Arabia	Saudi Arabia	2002-01-11	2015-09-22	transfer
00757	Ahamed Abdel Aziz	Mauritania	Mauritania	2002-10-28	2015-10-29	transfer
00239	Shaker Aamer	Saudi Arabia	United Kingdom	2002-02-14	2015-10-30	release
00045	Ali al Razihi	Yemen	UAE	2002-01-12	2015-11-16	release
00163	Khalid al Qadasi	Yemen	UAE	2002-02-09	2015-11-16	release
00165	Adil al Busayss	Yemen	UAE	2002-01-18	2015-11-16	release
00511	Suleiman al Nahdi	Yemen	UAE	2002-05-05	2015-11-16	release
00554	Fahmi al Asani	Yemen	UAE	2002-02-15	2015-11-16	release
00202	Mahmoud Omar Mohammed Bin Atef	Yemen	Ghana	2002-02-07	2016-01-06	release
00506	Khalid Mohammed Salih Al Dhuby	Yemen	Ghana	2002-05-05	2016-01-07	release
00552	Faiz Mohammed Ahmed al Kandari	Kuwait	Kuwait	2002-05-01	2016-01-08	release
00195	Mohammad Al Rahman Al Shumrani	Saudi Arabia	Saudi Arabia	2002-01-17	2016-01-11	release
00026	Fahed Abdullah Ahmad Ghazi	Yemen	Oman	2002-01-11	2016-01-13	release
00043	Samir Naji Al Hasan Moqbel	Yemen	Oman	2002-01-11	2016-01-13	release
00088	Waqas Mohammed Ali Awad	Yemen	Oman	2002-01-20	2016-01-13	release
00117	Muktar Yahya Najee al Warafi	Yemen	Oman	2002-05-01	2016-01-13	release
00171	Abu Bakr Ibn Ali Muhhammad Alahdal	Yemen	Oman	2002-01-14	2016-01-13	release
00233	Abdul Al Razzaq Muhammad Salih	Yemen	Oman	2002-02-11	2016-01-13]	release
00251	Muhhammad Said Bin Salem	Yemen	Oman	2002-06-07	2016-01-13	release
00255	Said Muhammed Salih Hatim	Yemen	Oman	2002-06-12	2016-01-13	release
00578	Abdul Aziz Abdullah Ali Al Suadi	Yemen	Montenegro		2016-01-20	release
00549	Omer Saeed Salem al Daini	Yemen	Oman	2002-02-15	2016-01-13	release
00688	Fahmi Abdullah Ahmed	Yemen	Oman	2002-06-18	2016-01-13	release
00189	Salem Abdul Salem Ghereby	Libya	Senegal	2002-05-05	2016-04-04	release
00695	Omar Khalifa Mohammed Abu Bakr	Libya	Senegal	2002-08-05	2016-04-04	release
00030	Ahmed Umar Abdullah Al Hikimi	Yemen	Saudi Arabia	2002-01-16	2016-04-16	release
00115	Abdul Rahman Mohammed Saleh Nasir	Yemen	Saudi Arabia	2002-06-12	2016-04-16	release
00167	Ali Yahya Mahdi Al-Raimi	Yemen	Saudi Arabia	2002-05-01	2016-04-16	release
00178	Tariq Ali Abdullah Ahmed Ba Odah	Yemen	unknown	2002-02-09	2016-04-16	release
00249	Muhammed Abdullah Muhammed Al-Hamiri	Yemen	Saudi Arabia	unknown	2016-04-16	release
00321	Ahmed Yaslam Said Kuman	Yemen	Saudi Arabia	2002-05-03	2016-04-16	release
00324	Mashur Abdullah Muqbil Ahmed Al-Sabri	Yemen	Saudi Arabia	2002-05-01	2016-04-16	release
00461	Abd al Rahman Al-Qyati	Yemen	Saudi Arabia	2002-05-03	2016-04-16	release
00566	Mansour Muhammed Ali Al-Qatta	Yemen	Saudi Arabia	2002-06-18	2016-04-16	release
00037	Abdel Malik Ahmed Abdel Wahab Al Rahabi	Yemen	Montenegro	2002-01-11	2016-06-22	granted asylum
00153	Fayiz Ahmad Yahia Suleiman	Yemen	Italy	2002-01-17	2016-07-10	transferred
00257	Omar Abdulayev	Tajikistan	Serbia	2002-02-09	2016-07-11	transferred
00441	Mansur Ahmad Saad al-Dayfi	Yemen	Serbia	2002-02-09	2016-07-11	transferred
00031	Mahmud Abd Al Aziz al-Mujahid	Yemen	United Arab Emirates	2002-01-12	2016-08-15	transfer
00033	Muhammad Ahmad Said al-Adahi	Yemen	United Arab Emirates	2002-01-17	2016-08-15	transfer
00040	Abdel Qadir al-Mudafari	Yemen	United Arab Emirates	2002-01-15	2016-08-15	transfer
00041	Majid Mahmud Abdu Ahmed	Yemen	United Arab Emirates	2002-01-17	2016-08-15	transfer
00091	Abd al-Muhsin Abd al-Rab Salih al-Busi	Yemen	United Arab Emirates	2002-02-10	2016-08-15	transfer
00223	Abd al-Rahman Sulayman	Yemen	United Arab Emirates	2002-02-12	2016-08-15	transfer
00235	Saeed Ahmed Mohammed Abdullah Sarem Jarabh	Yemen	United Arab Emirates	2002-02-12	2016-08-15	transfer
00509	Mohammed Nasir Yahi Khussrof Kazaz	Yemen	United Arab Emirates	2002-05-03	2016-08-15	transfer
00576	Zahar Omar Hamis bin Hamdoun	Yemen	United Arab Emirates	2002-05-05	2016-08-15	transfer
00728	Abdul Muhammad Ahmad Nassar al-Muhajari	Yemen	United Arab Emirates	2002-08-05	2016-08-15	transfer
00762	Obaidullah	Afghanistan	United Arab Emirates	2002-10-28	2016-08-15	transfer
00836	Ayub Murshid Ali Salih	Yemen	United Arab Emirates	2002-10-28	2016-08-15	transfer
00837	Bashir Nasir Ali al-Marwalah	Yemen	United Arab Emirates	2002-10-28	2016-08-15	transfer
01119	Hamid al-Razak	Afghanistan	United Arab Emirates	2003-11-23	2016-08-15	transfer
01045	Mohammed Kamin	Afghanistan	United Arab Emirates	2004-09-20	2016-08-15	transfer
00760	Mohamedou Ould Slahi	Mauritania	Mauritania	2002-08-05	2016-10-17	release
00838	Shawki Awad Balzuhair	Yemen	Cape Verde	2002-10-28	2016-12-04	transfer
00044	Mohammed Rajab Sadiq Abu Ghanim	Yemen	Saudi Arabia	2002-01-11	2017-01-05	transfer
00131	Salem Ahmed Hadi	Yemen	Saudi Arabia	2002-01-20	2017-01-05	transfer
00240	Abdullah Yahia Yousf al Shabli	Yemen	Saudi Arabia	2002-02-07	2017-01-05	transfer
00440	Mohammed Ali Abdullah Bwazir	Yemen	Saudi Arabia	2002-05-01	2017-01-05	transfer
00029	Mohammed al Ansi	Yemen	Oman	2002-01-16	2017-01-16	"temporary residence"
00128	Ghaleb Nassar Al Bihani	Yemen	Oman	2002-01-17	2017-01-16	"temporary residence"
00434	Mustafa al-Shamyri	Yemen	Oman	2002-06-12	2017-01-16	"temporary residence"
00498	Muhammed Ahmad Said Haydar	Yemen	Oman	2002-05-03	2017-01-16	"temporary residence"
00508	Salman Yahya Hassan Mohammed Rabeii	Yemen	Oman	2002-05-01	2017-01-16	"temporary residence"
00550	Walid Said Bin Said Zaid	Yemen	Oman	2002-05-03	2017-01-16	"temporary residence"
00753	Abdul Zahir	Afghanistan	Oman	2002-10-28	2017-01-16	"temporary residence"
00839	Musab Omar Ali al Madhwani	Yemen	Oman	2002-10-28	2017-01-16	"temporary residence"
00840	Hayl al Mithali	Yemen	Oman	2002-10-28	2017-01-16	"temporary residence"
00975	Bostan Karim	Afghanistan	Oman	2003-03-23	2017-01-16	"temporary residence"
00696	Jabran al Qahtani	Saudi Arabia	Saudi Arabia	2002-08-05	2017-01-18	repatriation
00702	Ravil Mingazov	Russia	United Arab Emirates	2002-10-28	2017-01-18	transfer
00560	Wali Muhammed	Afghanistan	United Arab Emirates	2002-05-01	2017-01-18	transfer
00522	Yassim Qasim Mohammed Ismail Qasim	Yemen	United Arab Emirates	2002-05-01	2017-01-18	transfer
00768	Ahmed al-Darbi	Saudi Arabia	Saudi Arabia	2003-03-23	2018-05-01	transfer
00244	Abdul Latif Nasir	Morocco	Morocco	2002-05-03	2021-07-19	repatriation
00063	Mohammed al-Qahtani	Saudi Arabia	Saudi Arabia	2002-02-13	2022-03-06	repatriation
00694	Sufyian Barhoumi	Algeria	Algeria	2002-06-18	2022-04-02	repatriation
03148	Asadullah Haroon Gul	Afghanistan	Afghanistan	2007-06-22	2022-06-24	repatriation
1094	Saifullah Paracha	Pakistan	Pakistan	2004-09-19	2022-10-09	repatriation
10020	Majid Khan	Pakistan	Belize	2006-09-04	2023-02-02	release
1461	Mohammed Ahmad Ghulam Rabbani	Pakistan	Pakistan	2004-09-19	2023-02-23	repatriation
1460	Abdul Al-Rahim Ghulam Rabbani	Pakistan	Pakistan	2004-09-19	2023-02-23	repatriation
682	Ghassan Al Sharbi	Saudi Arabia	Saudi Arabia	2002-06-19	2023-03-08	repatriation
685	Said bin Brahim bin Umran Bakush	Algeria	Algeria	2002-06-19	2023-04-20	repatriation
10025	Mohammed Abdul Malik Bajabu	Kenya	Kenya	2007-03-26	2024-12-17	repatriation
10021	Mohammed Farik bin Amin	Malaysia	Malaysia	2007-08-09	2024-12-18	repatriation
10022	Mohammed Nazir bin Lep	Malaysia	Malaysia	2006-09-06	2024-12-18	repatriation
038	Ridah Bin Saleh al-Yazidi	Tunisia	Tunisia	2002-01-11	2024-12-30	repatriation
27	Uthman Abd al-Rahim Muhammad Uthman	Yemen	Oman	2002-12-11	2025-01-06	resettlement
28	Moath Hamza Ahmed al-Alwi	Yemen	Oman	2002-01-17	2025-01-06	resettlement
242	Khalid Ahmed Qassim	Yemen	Oman	2002-05-01	2025-01-06	resettlement
569	Suhayl Abdul Anam al Sharabi	Yemen	Oman	2002-05-05	2025-01-06	resettlement
841	Hani Saleh Rashid Abdullah	Yemen	Oman	2002-10-28	2025-01-06	resettlement
893	Tawfiq Nasir Awad Al-Bihani	Yemen	Oman	2003-02-07	2025-01-06	resettlement
1017	Omar Mohammed Ali al-Rammah	Yemen	Oman	2003-05-09	2025-01-06	resettlement
1453	Sanad Ali Yislam Al Kazimi	Yemen	Oman	2004-09-20	2025-01-06	resettlement
1456	Hassan Muhammad Ali Bib Attash	Yemen	Oman	2004-09-20	2025-01-06	resettlement
1457	Sharqawi Abdu Ali Al Hajj	Yemen	Oman	2004-09-20	2025-01-06	resettlement
1463	Abd Al-Salam Al-Hilah	Yemen	Oman	2004-09-20	2025-01-06	resettlement

== Countries that have accepted non-citizen detainees ==
These are countries that have accepted the transfer of former Guantanamo detainees who are not their own citizens.

Nation	First transfer	Notes
Albania	2006-05-05	Albania accepted five Uyghur captives in Guantanamo. All five men had been determined to "no longer be enemy combatants".; Albania accepted three more former captives, who also had been determined to "no longer be enemy combatants".; On February 24, 2010, Albania accepted three former captives, a Tunisian, an Egyptian, and a Libyan.
Algeria	2006-11-17	Algeria has accepted many ex-Guantanamo prisoners
Belize	2023-02-02	Majid Khan, a Pakistani citizen and Resident status in the US, was released to Belize
Bermuda	2009-06-11	Four Uyghur captives in Guantanamo were transferred to Bermuda in June 2009. The move was called controversial first because the United Kingdom still has jurisdiction over Bermuda's foreign affairs, and UK legal scholars argued the government of Bermuda did not have the authority to accept the men. Secondly the Prime Minister of Bermuda said the men would be offered citizenship—a right denied to other long term residents not born in Bermuda.
Bulgaria	2010-05-03	On May 4, 2010, Bulgaria accepted Maasoum Abdah Mouhammad, a Syrian. Initially his identity was withheld. Local journalists were able to determine his name.
Cape Verde	2010-07-19	Cape Verde accepted Syrian Abd al Nisr Mohammed Khantumani on July 19, 2010.; Cape Verde accepted Yemeni Shawki Awad Balzuhair on December 4, 2016.
El Salvador	2012-04-19	Gave refuge to Abdul Razakah and Hammad Memet, two former Uyghur captives on April 18, 2012.
Estonia	2015-01-14	A Yemeni, Ahmed Abdul Qader, was transferred to Estonia on January 14, 2015, when four other Yemenis were transferred to Oman.
France	2009-05-15	France has accepted two former captives originally from Algeria, who had become Bosnian citizens. US District Court Judge Ricardo Urbina had ruled the men should be released, in November 2008, because there was no credible evidence to support the allegations that had initially lead to their detention.
Georgia	2010-03-23	On January 24, 2010, Tunisian captive Abdul Haddi Bin Hadiddi was transferred to Georgia.
Germany	2006-08-24	Murat Kurnaz was born in Germany, to Turkish guest workers in Germany, and was applying for German citizenship, when he was captured during a brief visit to Pakistan. He was transferred to Germany on August 24, 2006.; Saudi captive Ohmed Ahmed Mahamoud Al Shurfa and Syrian captive Mahmoud Salim al-Ali were transferred to Germany on September 16, 2010.
Ghana	2016-01-06	Two Yemenis, Mahmoud Omar Mohammed Bin Atef and Khalid Mohammed Salih Al Dhuby were released to Ghana on January 7, 2016.
Hungary	2009-11-30	Hungary has accepted one former Palestinian captive in Guantanamo, Mahrar Rafat al Quwari.
Ireland	2009-09-27	Ireland accepted two former Uzbekistani captives in Guantanamo. The Irish government had requested the press respect the privacy of them men, and not publish their names, but their names were published anyhow.
Italy	2009-11-30	Italy has accepted the transfer of three Tunisian captives in Guantanamo. According to press reports, the three Tunisians were former residents of Italy. According to press reports, unlike the other countries which have accepted former Guantanamo captives who weren't citizens, Italy plans to prosecute at least two of the men.; On July 9, 2016, Yemini captive Fayiz Ahmad Yahia Suleiman was transferred to Italy.
Kazakhstan	2014-12-30	Kazakhstan provided a home to Three Yemenis and two Tunisias, on December 30, 2014. According to Andy Worthington, quoting the New York Times, a senior Obama administration official stated that the five "are 'free men' for all intents and purposes after the transfer." The five men were Abdullah bin Ali al-Lufti, Adel al-Hakeemy, Sabri Mohammad Ibrahim al-Qurashi, Asim Thahit Abdullah al Khalaqi, Muhammad Ali Husayn Khanayna.
Latvia	2010-07-22	On February 2, 2010, Latvian Foreign Ministry officials announced that Latvia would be accepting a Guantanamo captive within the next six months. Latvian authorities did not reveal his identity, or which nation he was from, but they did reveal he was from another nation that had been part of the Soviet Union.
Montenegro	2016-01-20	On January 20, 2016, Yemeni Abdul Aziz Abdullah Ali Al Suadi was granted asylum in Montenegro.; On June 22, 2016, Yemeni Abdel Malik Ahmed Abdel Wahab Al Rahabi was granted asylum in Montenegro.
Oman	2014-01-14	Four Yemenis, Al Khadr Abdallah Muhammed Al Yafi, Abd al Rahman Abdullah Ali Muhammad, Fadil Husayn Salih Hintif, Mohammed Ahmed Salam were transferred to Oman on January 14, 2015. A fifth Yemeni was transferred to Estonia.; Six Yemenis, Idris Ahmed Abdu Qader Idris, Sharaf Ahmad Muhammad Masud, Jalal Salam Awad Awad, Saad Masir Mukbl al Azani, Emad Abdalla Hassan, and Mohammed Ali Salem al Zarnuki were transferred to Oman on June 13, 2015.; Ten Yemenis, Fahed Abdullah Ahmad Ghazi, Samir Naji Al Hasan Moqbel, Waqas Mohammed Ali Awad, Muktar Yahya Najee al Warafi, Abu Bakr Ibn Ali Muhhammad Alahdal, Abdul Al Razzaq Muhammad Salih, Muhhammad Said Bin Salem, Said Muhammed Salih Hatim, Omer Saeed Salem al Daini, and Fahmi Abdullah Ahmed were transferred to Oman on January 13, 2016.; Ten captives were transferred "temporary residence" on January 16, 2017. Their names and nationalities were initially withheld. There were two Afghans, Abdul Zahir and Bostan Karim and eight Yemenis Mohammed al Ansi, Muhammed Ahmad Said Haydar, Salman Yahya Hassan Mohammed Rabei'i, Musab Omar Ali al Madhwani, Ghaleb al Bihani, Mustafa al Shamiri, Walid Said Bin Said Zaid and Hayl al Mithali.; 11 Yemenis were transferred on Jan 6, 2025.
Pakistan	2022-10-09	Pakistan accepted Sufaillah Paracha and the Rabbani brothers, all Pakistanis.
Palau	2009-10-31	Six Uyghur captives in Guantanamo were transferred to Palau in October 2009. The move was called controversial because Palau is a former protectorate of the US, which still received much of its annual budget in the form of grants from the US.
Portugal	2009-08-28	Portugal accepted two Syrian captives.
Qatar	2008-07-26	Five men described as "Taliban leaders" were transferred to Qatar in return for the release of US GI Bowe Bergdahl.
Saudi Arabia	2007-07-15	On April 16, 2016, nine Yemeni individuals were transferred to Saudi Arabia -- Ahmed Umar Abdullah al Hikimi, Abdul Rahman Mohamed Saleh Naser, Ali Yahya Mahdi al Raimi, Mohammad al Rahman al Shumrani, Mohammed Abdullah al Hamiri, Ahmed Yaslam Said Kuman, Mashur Abdallah Muqbil Ahmed al Sabri, Abdul Rahman Umir al Qyati, Mansoor Muhammed Ali Qattaa.; On January 5, 2017, four Yemeni individuals were transferred to Saudi Arabia -- Mohammed Rajab Sadiq Abu Ghanim, Salem Ahmed Hadi, Abdullah Yahia Yousf al Shabli and Mohammed Ali Abdullah Bwazir.
Senegal	2016-04-04	Salem Abdul Salem Ghereby and Omar Khalifa Mohammed Abu Bakr were transferred to Senegal on April 4, 2016.
Serbia	2016-07-11	On July 11, 2016, Tajikistan Omar Abdulayev and Yemeni Mansur Ahmad Saad al-Dayfi were transferred to Serbia.
Slovakia	2010-01-24	Slovakia accepted three former captives on January 26, 2010. Their names were withheld. Tunisian Rafiq Bin Bashir Bin Jalud Al Hami was later confirmed to be one of those individuals.; Slovakia took in three more Uyghur detainees on December 31, 2013
Spain	2005-07-18	On February 24, 2010, Spain accepted the transfer of an individual who had formerly been a Palestinian captive in Guantananmo. Spain has agreed to take four additional captives. The Palestinian was later determined to be Assem Matruq Mohammad al Aasmi.; On May 4, 2010, Spain accepted Yasin Basardh, a Yemeni. Initially his identity was withheld. Local journalists were able to determine his name.
Switzerland	2010-01-26	Switzerland accepted one former Uzbekistani captive on January 26, 2010. His name was withheld. Andy Worthington, the author of The Guantanamo Files reported that he was Ali Sher Hamidullah.; On February 3, 2010, Switzerland agreed to accept to Uyghur captives, brothers Arkin Mahmud and Bahtiyar Mahnut.
United Arab Emirates	2015-11-13	Five Yemenis, Ali al Razihi, Khalid al Qadasi, Adil al Busayss, Suleiman al Nahdi, and Fahmi al Asani, were released to the UAE on November 16, 2015.; On August 15, 2016, three Afghans, Obaidullah, Mohammed Kamin and Hamidullah, and twelve Yemenis, Mahmoud Abd al Aziz Abd al Mujahid, Mohammed Ahmad Said al Edah, Abdel Qadir Hussein al Mudhaffari, Majid Mahmud Abdu Ahmad, Abdul al Saleh, Abdul Rahman Abdul Abu Ghityh Sulayman, Saeed Ahmed Mohammed Abdullah Sarem Jarabh, Mohammed Nasir Yahya Khusruf, Zahar Omar Hamis Bin Hamdoun, Jamil Ahmed Said Nassir, Ayoub Murshid Ali Saleh, Bashir Nashir Al-Marwalah, were transferred.; On January 18, 2017 Russian Ravil Mingazov, Afghan Wali Muhammed, and Yemeni Yassim Qasim Mohammed Ismail Qasim were transferred to the UAE.
United Kingdom	2007-03-30	Nine Guantanamo captives had been long term legal residents of the United Kingdom. Initially the United Kingdom had only been prepared to request the return of another nine captives who were citizens of the United Kingdom. But when the public learned that Bisher al Rawi and Jamil el Banna, had been kidnapped in Gambia by the CIA only for their intelligence value—because they knew someone suspected of supporting terrorism, without supporting terrorism themselves, the UK requested the return of all the long term residents of the UK as well. Bisher al Rawi was repatriated first, followed by Jamil el Banna and five other men. Binyam Mohammed was repatriated a few days before a UK court was expected to force the UK government to publish classified memos to aid in him in his fight for return. Shaker Aamer became the final British resident to leave the detention camp in October 2015.
Uruguay	2014-12-07	Gave refuge to Ahmed Adnan Ahjam, Ali Hussein al-Shaaban, Abdelhadi Faraj, Abdul Bin Mohammed Abis Ourgy, Mohammed Taha Mattan and Abu Wa'el Dhiab.
