= Jan Mohammed (disambiguation) =

Jan Mohammed may refer to:

- Jan Mohammed Khan, former governor of Uruzgan province in Afghanistan
- Jan Muhammad Khan, Mughal faujdar of Sylhet
- Jon Mohammad Barakzai, former detainee at Guantanamo Bay detention camp
- Jan Mohammad Jamali, politician from Jaffarabad, Balochistan, Pakistan
- Jan Mohammad, Pakistani film director
