= Tom Johnson (lawyer) =

American lawyer

Tom Johnson is a Portland lawyer, working for the firm, Perkins Coie.

Johnson volunteered to serve as a lawyer to a Guantanamo detainee, a 33-year-old citizen of Kazakhstan named Ilkham Turdbyavich Batayev.

Batayev describes being kidnapped by fundamentalist Muslims allied to the Taliban during a trip to Tajikistan to sell fruit, who then traded him to the Taliban, who used him as a kitchen slave. Following the American bombing, everyone fled the Taliban camp where he was held. Batayev described fleeing and subsequently being captured by fundamentalist Muslims allied to the US in return for a bounty.
