= Ehsanullah (Guantanamo detainee) =

Afghan Guantanamo detainee (born 1977)

- Born: 1977 (age 48–49); Sarwan Qala, Afghanistan
- Arrested: Nahreem, Afghanistan
- Released: September 2004
- Detained at: Kandahar; Bagram; Guantanamo
- ISN: 523
- Charge: No charge (extrajudicial detention)
- Status: Repatriated

Ehsanullah (born 1977) is a citizen of Afghanistan who was held in extrajudicial detention in the United States Guantanamo Bay detention camps, in Cuba.

His Guantanamo Internment Serial Number was 523. He worked as a farmer before he was recruited as a guard for the Taliban and served as such in Nahreen. After three months of working as a guard, the Northern Alliance took over the facility and he was handed over to US forces. Eventually he was sent to Guantanamo Bay, Cuba on June 12, 2002, for his supposed knowledge of leadership of the Taliban in the area. He was recommended for release on September 27, 2002, by Michael Dunlavey, because he was not a threat to the United States, nor could provide information of terrorist activity.

== McClatchy News Service interview ==
On June 15, 2008, the McClatchy News Service published a series of articles based on interviews with 66 former Guantanamo captives. Ehsanullah was one of the former captives who had an article profiling him.

Ehsanullah acknowledged having once served as a Taliban foot-soldier, but stated he was an involuntary conscript. He said he abandoned his post as soon as he learned that the Taliban government had collapsed, and was trying to make his way home, when he was captured by Northern Alliance soldiers. He said he and other captives, taken at the same time, were sold to the Americans for a bounty. "The commander told the Americans that he had arrested high-ranking Taliban and got $5,000 for each of us."

According to Ehsanullah: "There was no training. They said, 'This is the trigger; pull it.'"

Ehsanullah was interviewed by telephone because he feared local Taliban sympathizers learning he had met with a foreigner. The McClatchy reporters found that local security officials had never heard of him.

Ehsanullah was held in both the Bagram Theater Internment Facility and the Kandahar detention facility, prior to being transferred to Guantanamo. He reported being physically abused in American custody in Afghanistan, and he reported witnessing an American GI throwing a Koran into a bucket of excrement.

Ehsanullah said conditions were better in Guantanamo, no one beat him, he was interrogated infrequently, and when he was: "They kept asking me why I was arrested?" He said: "They told me that the (Northern Alliance) commander had sold me to them, and they were trying to figure out what the truth was."

Ehsanullah was held for less than a year.

== Height and weight records ==
On March 16, 2007, the Department of Defense published limited height and weight records for the captives.

== See also ==
- Ehsanullah, a Guantanamo captive with a similar name, released on March 23, 2003, six weeks earlier.
