= Mustafa al-Shamyri =

Yemeni mistakenly jailed by the United States

Mustafa Abd al-Qawi Abd al-Aziz al-Shamiri
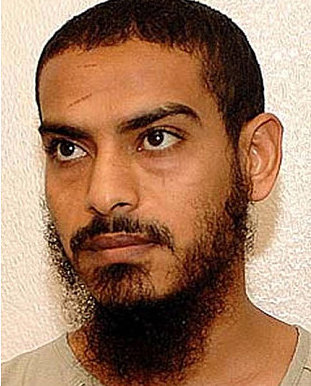
- Mustafa Abd al-Qawi Abd al-Aziz al-Shamiri's Guantanamo identity portrait, showing him wearing the white uniform issued to compliant individuals.
- Born: July 7, 1978 (age 48); Sanaa, Yemen
- Released: 2017-01-16; Oman
- Citizenship: Yemen
- Detained at: Guantanamo
- ISN: 434
- Charge: no charge extrajudicial detention
- Status: transferred to Oman on 2017-01-16

Mustafa Abd al-Qawi Abd al-Aziz al-Shamiri is a citizen of Yemen who was mistakenly held in extrajudicial detention in the United States Guantanamo Bay detainment camp in Cuba. Al Shamiri's Guantanamo detainee ID number was 434. The Department of Defense reported that Al Shamiri was born on July 7, 1978, in Sanaa, Yemen. He was released and sent to Oman with nine other men on January 16, 2017.

== Held due to mistaken identity ==
At his 2015 Periodic Review Board hearing, the DoD acknowledged that they had realized that Shamiri had been held due to a misidentification. According to NBC News, Guantanamo analysts explained the identity confusion by admitting their colleagues had relied on "fragmentary reporting" that linked him to volunteering in the civil war that led to Bosnian independence during the breakup of Yugoslavia. With regard to the more serious allegations that had been used to justify his detention, they stated "we now judge that these activities were carried out by other known extremists".

In January 2016, he was "cleared for release". He was released and sent to Oman with nine other men, on January 16, 2017.

== Official status reviews ==
Originally the Bush presidency asserted that captives apprehended in the "war on terror" were not covered by the Geneva Conventions, and could be held indefinitely, without charge, and without an open and transparent review of the justifications for their detention. In 2004, the United States Supreme Court ruled, in Rasul v. Bush, that Guantanamo captives were entitled to being informed of the allegations justifying their detention, and were entitled to try to refute them.

=== Office for the Administrative Review of Detained Enemy Combatants ===
Combatant Status Review Tribunals were held in a 3x5 meter trailer where the captive sat with his hands and feet shackled to a bolt in the floor.

Following the Supreme Court's ruling the Department of Defense set up the Office for the Administrative Review of Detained Enemy Combatants.

Scholars at the Brookings Institution, led by Benjamin Wittes, listed the captives still held in Guantanamo in December 2008, according to whether their detention was justified by certain common allegations:

- Mustafa Abd al-Qawi Abd al-Aziz al-Shamiri was listed as one of the captives who "The military alleges ... are members of Al Qaeda."
- Mustafa Abd al-Qawi Abd al-Aziz al-Shamiri was listed as one of the captives who "The military alleges ... traveled to Afghanistan for jihad."
- Mustafa Abd al-Qawi Abd al-Aziz al-Shamiri was listed as one of the captives who "The military alleges that the following detainees stayed in Al Qaeda, Taliban or other guest- or safehouses."
- Mustafa Abd al-Qawi Abd al-Aziz al-Shamiri was listed as one of the captives who "The military alleges ... took military or terrorist training in Afghanistan."
- Mustafa Abd al-Qawi Abd al-Aziz al-Shamiri was listed as one of the captives who "The military alleges ... fought for the Taliban."
- Mustafa Abd al-Qawi Abd al-Aziz al-Shamiri was listed as one of the captives whose "names or aliases were found on material seized in raids on Al Qaeda safehouses and facilities."
- Mustafa Abd al-Qawi Abd al-Aziz al-Shamiri was listed as one of the captives who "The military alleges that the following detainees were captured under circumstances that strongly suggest belligerency."
- Mustafa Abd al-Qawi Abd al-Aziz al-Shamiri was listed as one of the captives who was an "al Qaeda operative".
- Mustafa Abd al-Qawi Abd al-Aziz al-Shamiri was listed as one of the "82 detainees made no statement to CSRT or ARB tribunals or made statements that do not bear materially on the military's allegations against them."
