= Mahmud Salem Horan Mohammed Mutlak Al Ali =

Syrian detainee

- Born: 5 May 1974 (age 52); Doha, Syria
- Detained at: Guantanamo
- ISN: 537
- Status: Released to Germany in September 2010
- Spouse: Married
- Children: 1

Mahmud Salem Horan Mohammed Mutlak Al Ali is a citizen of Syria, best known for the more than eight years he spent in the Guantanamo Bay detention camps in Cuba after being classified as an enemy combatant by the United States. His Guantanamo Internment Serial Number was 537. Joint Task Force Guantanamo counter-terrorism analysts report that Mahmud Salem Horan Mohammed Mutlak Al Ali was born on 5 May 1974, in Doha, Qatar. He and Palestinian Ohmed Ahmed Mahamoud Al Shurfa were released to Germany on 16 September 2010.

== Combatant Status Review ==
A Summary of Evidence memo was prepared for the tribunal. His memo accused him of the following:

a. The detainee is associated with al Qaida and the Taliban:
1. Detainee had a desire to join the Jihad after viewing the videos depicting the situation in Afghanistan, Bosnia and Chechnya.
2. Detainee read a Fatwa in late September 2001 and within two weeks he began his journey to Afghanistan.
3. Detainee planned his travel from his country of residence, Kuwait, to Afghanistan by traveling through Iran and Syria.
4. Detainee traveled to Afghanistan with the intent to attend training at the Al Farouq training camp, but this was closed, because of changes necessitated after the events on 11 September 2001.
5. Detainee entered Afghanistan on 24 October 2001 and stayed at a Taliban center in Ferah.
6. Detainee was captured in a clinic in Kabul where he was treated for an illness.

The memo was published three times. The first two instances contained redactions.

== Mahmud Salem Horan Mohammed Mutlak Al Ali v. George Walker Bush ==
A writ of habeas corpus, Mahmud Salem Horan Mohammed Mutlak Al Ali v. George Walker Bush, was submitted on Al Ali's behalf. In response, on 6 May 2005, the Department of Defense released 15 pages of unclassified documents related to his Combatant Status Review Tribunal.

=== Detainee election form ===
On 21 October 2004, his Personal Representative met with him, from 8:12 am to 8:32 am. His Person Representative recorded on his Detainee election form:

Detainee does not desire to participate in the Tribunal. Tribunal will be In Absentia. Detainee was unresponsive and did not say a word during the entire interview. However, I was able to present the unclassified evidence to him, which he read over two times. I have completed the initial interview silent detainee worksheet. Please cancel the 22 Oct, 0800 followup and 26 Oct 730 Final. The IA Tribunal is currently scheduled for 27 Oct, 1300.

=== Decision memo ===
His "enemy combatant" status was confirmed by Tribunal panel 15, which convened October 23, 2004. The decision memo recorded that the captive did not participate in his Tribunal. It recorded that the Tribunal relied entirely on classified evidence.

The Personal Representative advised the detainee of his rights and gave the detainee a translated copy of the unclassified summary of the evidence. The PR said the detainee read the unclassified summary twice then handed it back to the PR. The detainee made a sarcastic expression indicating to the PR that the detainee understood the unclassified summary. The detainee was unresponsive to PR and that is how the PR determined that the detainee did [sic] want to participate in the Tribunal proceedings as outlined in exhibit D-a. The detainee did not participate in the hearing.

=== Boumediene v. Bush ===
On 12 June 2008, the United States Supreme Court ruled, in Boumediene v. Bush, that the Military Commissions Act could not remove the right for Guantanamo captives to access the US Federal Court system. All previous Guantanamo captives' habeas petitions were re-instated. On 18 July 2008, Samuel C. Kauffman renewed his habeas petition.

=== Administrative Review Board ===
Detainees whose Combatant Status Review Tribunal labeled them "enemy combatants" were scheduled for annual Administrative Review Board hearings. These hearings were designed to assess the threat a detainee might pose if released or transferred, and whether there were other factors that warranted his continued detention.

=== First annual Administrative Review Board ===
A Summary of Evidence memo was prepared for Mahmud Salem Horan Mohammed Mutlak Al Ali's first annual Administrative Review Board, on 6 October 2005. The memo listed twenty-two "primary factors favor[ing] continued detention" and nine "primary factors favor[ing] release or transfer".

=== Second annual Administrative Review Board ===
A Summary of Evidence memo was prepared for Mahmud Salem Horan Mohammed Mutlak Al Ali's second annual Administrative Review Board, on 19 June 2006. The memo listed six "primary factors favor[ing] continued detention" and six "primary factors favor[ing] release or transfer".

== Transfer to Germany ==
Al Ali, Saudi captive Ohmed Ahmed Mahamoud Al Shurfa, and another man were transferred to Germany on 16 September 2010. Al Ali was transferred to the Rhineland-Palatinate.

According to Der Spiegel Germany's Federal Government had sought the agreement of local authorities prior to completing the transfer. According to Der Spiegel, German officials asserted that American officials had cleared the two men of suspicion of involvement with terrorism. Der Spiegel reported a German official asserted: "According to our knowledge, he does not pose any threat ... We haven't brought a sleeper into our country," German officials conducted interviews with the two men, in Guantanamo, in March, to confirm their suitability for transfer to Germany. German officials contacted security officials in other European countries, to confirm they had no reason to suspect the men had ties to terrorism.
