= Slimane Hadj Abderrahmane =

Guantanamo Bay detainee

- Born: 5 August 1973; Roskilde, Denmark
- Arrested: 2002; Pakistan
- Released: 2004; Denmark
- Died: 16 February 2013 (aged 39); Syria
- Citizenship: Danish
- Detained at: Guantanamo
- ISN: 323
- Charge(s): No charge Extrajudicial detention
- Status: Repatriated
- Occupation: Postman

Slimane Hadj Abderrahmane (5 August 1973 – 16 February 2013) was a Danish citizen who was held in extrajudicial detention in the United States Guantanamo Bay detention camps, in Cuba. His Guantanamo Internment Serial Number was 323. The US Department of Defense reports he was born on 5 August 1973, in Roskilde, Denmark. His mother is Danish and his father is Algerian. When he was eight his family returned to Algeria, but his mother moved back to Denmark a year later. Then he lived with his paternal grandmother.

In 1993 Abderrahmane left Algeria and settled in Randers, Denmark, where he joined a music group and worked as a DJ in a club. He attended Aarhus University until 1998, but he did not complete his studies.

He is reported to have been inspired to travel to Afghanistan in the late 1990s at the Grimhøj Mosque, founded by an Algerian refugee named Athme Meheri. Danish journalist Morten Skjoldager described Meheri's mosque as a "radical mosque" in his book Truslen indefra (The Threat from Within). Abderrahmane was captured, in December 2001, in Afghanistan, near the Pakistan border. He was transferred to Guantanamo on 10 February 2002. He was repatriated to Denmark on 24 February 2004.

Abderrahmane's explanation for how he came to be captured was that he had traveled there to enroll in an Afghan military training camp to undergoing training so he could go fight with Muslim rebels in Chechnya. Abderrahmane was held in Guantanamo Bay for over two years. According to an article in U.S. News & World Report he was released in spite of reservations from US security officials because the Danes had threatened to withdraw their troops if he was not released. Abderrahmane was the subject of a 2004 book entitled Den naive terrorist.

After his release, Abderrahmane announced plans to travel to fight in Chechnya. He said he regarded the document he signed promising not to take part in terrorist activity as "toilet paper". Danish security officials talked him out of his trip. He has said that Denmark's role in the Occupation of Iraq meant that he thought Danish leaders were legitimate military targets. On 10 October 2007, in the Copenhagen suburb of Greve, Abderrahmane was sentenced to 10 months in jail for the theft of two passports and three credit cards which he used to withdraw more than 110,000 Danish kroner (approximately US$20,000). The items were stolen from the mail sorting office where Abderrahmane was working under a new Danish name. Police only recovered a small proportion of the stolen money and it is unknown where or how the remainder of the money was spent. During the trial, Abderrahmane refused to testify. He also refused to speak to or co-operate with his assigned lawyer.

In 2013, it was reported that he had been killed after joining the Syrian Civil War against Bashar al-Assad. According to the Copenhagen Post Slimane was believed to be one of a number of Danish Muslims who had traveled to Syria to volunteer to help overthrow Assad. Reason and Long War Journal wrote that Slimane's death underscored the international contribution to the Syrian opposition.

On 25 August 2014, the High Court of Eastern Denmark refused to issue a legal finding of death regarding Slimane Hahj Abderrahmane. The appeals court did not find any facts sufficiently substantiated an assumption of death.
