= Mahmud Sadik =

Guantanamo detainee

- Born: 1952 (age 73–74)
- Detained at: Guantanamo
- Other name: Mohammed Saduq
- ISN: 512
- Status: Repatriated

Mahmud Sadik (born 1952) is a citizen of Afghanistan who was held in extrajudicial detention in the United States Guantanamo Bay detention camps, in Cuba. His Guantanamo Internment Serial Number was 512.

== McClatchy News Service interview ==
On June 15, 2008, the McClatchy News Service published a series of articles based on interviews with 66 former Guantanamo captives. Mohammed Saduq was one of the former captives who had an article profiling him.

Mohammed Saduq reported he was captured in his home in Chaman, not on a battlefield.

His capture didn't surprise him because as the director of an orphanage, he was a civil servant appointed by the Taliban. The McClatchy article reported that the Tahia Maskan orphanage he directed:

...was, by most accounts, a place where children were malnourished and often beaten, another horrific corner of the Taliban world, but not an important post.

According to the first governor of Helmand Province appointed by Hamid Karzai, Shir Mohammed, stated Mohammed Saduq

...was not a military guy, he was not a minister, but he was someone the Taliban consulted with because he was seen as someone who understood politics.

Mohammed Saduq reported being beaten by guards in the Kandahar detention facility and the Bagram Theater internment facility, but not by his interrogators. He described conditions in these camps as primitive.

Mohammed Saduq acknowledged to his interrogators that he had met Mullah Mohammed Omar, and much of his interrogations focussed around these brief meetings.

According to the McClatchy interviewer, Mohammed Saduq hopes the Taliban retake Afghanistan.

During the Soviet occupation of Afghanistan Mohammed Saduq commanded Abdul Salam Zaeef, who was later to rise be the Taliban's ambassador to Pakistan. Saduq said that when he re-encountered Zaeef in Guantanamo his health seemed frail.

...very weak, physically, when I saw him at Guantanamo. It is very difficult to know the inside of a man, and it's hard to say how it affected him — going from an ambassador to being in a cage — but he told me in Guantanamo that he was suffering badly.
