= Ha'il Aziz Ahmad Al Maythal =

Yemeni prisoner (born 1977)

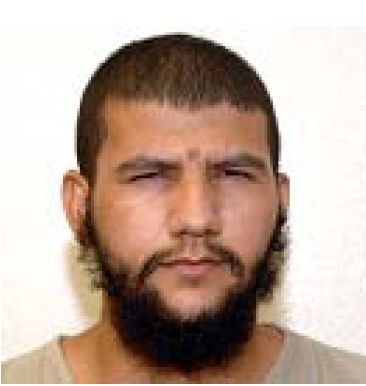
- Born: 1977 (age 48–49); Sanaa, Yemen
- Arrested: September 11, 2002; Karachi, Pakistan
- Detained at: Guantanamo
- Other name: Ha'il Aziz Ahmed al Maythali
- ISN: 840
- Status: Transferred to Oman on January 16, 2017

Ha'il Aziz Ahmad Al Maythal is a citizen of Yemen, who was held in extrajudicial detention in the United States Guantanamo Bay detention camp, in Cuba. American intelligence analysts estimate that he was born in 1977, in Zemar, Yemen.

As of August 14, 2011, Hail Aziz Ahmad Al Maythal has been held at Guantanamo for eight years 10 month.

Maythal was transferred to Oman on January 16, 2017.

== Official status reviews ==
Originally the Bush Presidency asserted that captives apprehended in the "war on terror" were not covered by the Geneva Conventions, and could be held indefinitely, without charge, and without an open and transparent review of the justifications for their detention. In 2004, the United States Supreme Court ruled, in Rasul v. Bush, that Guantanamo captives were entitled to being informed of the allegations justifying their detention, and were entitled to try to refute them.

=== Office for the Administrative Review of Detained Enemy Combatants ===
Combatant Status Review Tribunals were held in a 3x5 meter trailer where the captive sat with his hands and feet shackled to a bolt in the floor.

Following the Supreme Court's ruling the Department of Defense set up the Office for the Administrative Review of Detained Enemy Combatants.

Scholars at the Brookings Institution, led by Benjamin Wittes, listed the captives still held in Guantanamo in December 2008, according to whether their detention was justified by certain common allegations:

- Ha'il Aziz Ahmad Al Maythal was listed as one of the captives who "The military alleges ... traveled to Afghanistan for jihad."
- Ha'il Aziz Ahmad Al Maythal was listed as one of the captives who "The military alleges that the following detainees stayed in Al Qaeda, Taliban or other guest- or safehouses."
- Ha'il Aziz Ahmad Al Maythal was listed as one of the captives who "The military alleges ... took military or terrorist training in Afghanistan."
- Ha'il Aziz Ahmad Al Maythal was listed as one of the captives who "The military alleges ... fought for the Taliban."
- Ha'il Aziz Ahmad Al Maythal was listed as one of the captives whose "names or aliases were found on material seized in raids on Al Qaeda safehouses and facilities."
- Ha'il Aziz Ahmad Al Maythal was listed as one of the captives who "The military alleges that the following detainees were captured under circumstances that strongly suggest belligerency."
- Ha'il Aziz Ahmad Al Maythal was listed as one of the captives who "The military alleges ... served on Osama Bin Laden's security detail."
- Ha'il Aziz Ahmad Al Maythal was listed as one of the captives who was an "al Qaeda operative".
- Ha'il Aziz Ahmad Al Maythal was listed as one of "36 [captives who] openly admit either membership or significant association with Al Qaeda, the Taliban, or some other group the government considers militarily hostile to the United States."
- Ha'il Aziz Ahmad Al Maythal was listed as one of the captives who had admitted "fighting on behalf of Al Qaeda or the Taliban."

=== Habeas corpus petition ===
Ha'il Aziz Ahmed Al Maythal's habeas corpus petition was first filed on November 7, 2005.

On July 18, 2008, Jennifer R. Cowan renewed his habeas petition.

=== Periodic Review ===
Al Maythal's Guantanamo Review Task Force had concurred with earlier review boards, and recommended he be classed as too dangerous to release, although there was no evidence to justify charging him with a crime.
