= Abdullah Ghofoor =

- Born: 1971; Keshai, Afghanistan
- Released: March 14, 2004; Afghanistan
- Detained at: Guantanamo
- ISN: 351
- Status: repatriated, subsequently engaged in hostilities and killed

Abdullah Ghofoor (born 1971) was a citizen of Afghanistan who was held in the United States Guantanamo Bay detainment camps, in Cuba. American counter-terrorism analysts estimate he was born in 1971, in Keshai, Afghanistan.

He arrived in Guantanamo on June 10, 2002, and was repatriated to Afghanistan on March 14, 2004.

== Repatriation ==
On November 25, 2009, the United States Department of Defense published a list of the dates captives were transferred from Guantanamo. According to that list, Abdullah Ghofoor was transferred on March 14, 2004.

== Suspected of becoming a Taliban leader after release ==
The Defense Intelligence Agency suspected that Ghofoor had become a Taliban leader after his release from Guantanamo. It stated that Ghofoor was eventually killed in a raid but did not say when he was killed.
