= Said Amir Jan =

Afghan Guantanamo detainee

Said Amir Jan is a citizen of Afghanistan who is still held in extrajudicial detention after being transferred from United States Guantanamo Bay detainment camps, in Cuba — to an Afghan prison.

American intelligence analysts estimate that Jan was born in 1980, in Koozbia, Afghanistan. The Department of Defense assigned him the Internment Serial Number 945.

== Combatant Status Review ==
Jan chose to participate in his Combatant Status Review Tribunal.

A Summary of Evidence memo was prepared for Said Amir Jan's Combatant Status Review Tribunal, on 22 December 2004. The memo listed the following allegations against him:

a. The detainee is associated with al Qaida and the Taliban.
1. The detainee is associated with al Qaida.
2. The detainee is associated with the Taliban.
3. The detainee is known by an al Qaida facilitator.
4. The detainee has attempted to travel on a false visa.
5. The detainee was trained by a General on the use of a Kalashnikov rifle.
6. The detainee is possibly associated with UBL (Usama Bin Laden) terrorist activities based upon information gathered from telephone records.
7. The detainee reports being imprisoned by the Taliban for 5 years, approximately 1996 through 2001.
8. The detainee reports that he has children born in approximately 1998 (4 years old in 2003) and 2000 (2-3 years old in 2003), which conflicts with his stated imprisonment dates.

b. The detainee participated in military operations against the coalition.
1. The detainee reportedly admitted to planning to plant explosive devices. Detainee: I never did that.
2. The detainee was identified as a person who was going to plant the explosive devices.

== Administrative Review Board hearing ==
Detainees who were determined to have been properly classified as "enemy combatants" were scheduled to have their dossiers reviewed at annual Administrative Review Board hearings. The Administrative Review Boards were not authorized to review whether a detainee qualified for POW status, nor authorized to review whether a detainee should have been classified as an "enemy combatant".

They were authorized to consider whether a detainee should continue to be detained by the United States, because they continued to pose a threat—and whether they could safely be repatriated to the custody of their home country, or whether they could be set free.

Jan chose to participate in his Administrative Review Board hearing.

The following primary factors favor continued detention

a. Commitment
1. The detainee and three others were identified as planning terrorist attacks against United States forces in the Jalalabad area. Improvised explosive devices (IEDs) were made in Pakistan and transported to a military compound where these four men were going to use bicycles and motorcycles as delivery systems. A raid on the compound resulted in the discovery of the IEDs and associated materials to include two bicycles and a motorcycle.
2. The IEDs were found in some bathrooms located adjacent to Qari Naqibullah’s (a.k.a. Qari Naqib) room, both of the bathrooms were non-operational and used for storage.
3. The other two individuals reportedly involved in the planned attack arrived at the compound before dark wearing civilian clothes and reportedly were the ones who transported the IEDs to the compound.
4. The detainee was very resistant and was in control of the IEDs at the time of capture. The detainee admitted to spending some time at a madrassa in Pakistan.
5. The detainee admitted that he was going to place the bombs the night before his arrest but was convinced to wait until morning. The detainee is believed to have received training in al Qaida compounds in Pakistan.
6. The detainee originally claimed that the IEDs in the room had been left by the Taliban years prior. He later changed his story, claiming that Qari Naqib had brought the IEDs to the compound.
7. Qari Naqib was the leader of the bombing cell, and all members received training on the use of the bombs from the builder of the bombs at a madrassa in Pakistan. The group worked for M. Kabir’s organization within the Taliban.

b. Training
1. The detainee received military training on the Kalashnikov, but claims he does not know how to operate RPGs, grenades, bombs, machine guns, and land mines.

c. Connections/Associations
1. A four-man cell was planning to detonate bombs on 28 January in Jalalabad, targeting United States, United Nations, and non-Afghan support personnel. The bombers were promised participation in the operational planning cell of Kari Mohadin, deputy of Maulawi Kabir, once the bombing was completed successfully.
2. Mullah Kabir is the former Governor of Jalalabad and a Taliban Deputy.
3. Naqib is friends with two al Qaida members who worked for a Taliban man named Noor Mohammad in Pakistan.
4. Maulawi Noor Mohammad is the former Taliban district chief of Deh Bala and a trusted associate of the former Taliban Governor of Nangarhar Province, Maulawi Kabir. Noor Mohammad stockpiled weapons and recruited Afghanis to agitate against the Afghan Transitional Administration.

d. Other Relevant Data
1. When the Taliban came to power in Afghanistan, the detainee served as a "freedom fighter" for Haji Qadir, governor of Jalalabad, and enemy of the Taliban and al Qaida. The detainee had four men under his direct supervision.
2. During a fight with the Taliban and al Qaida near Jalalabad, the detainee was captured along with 120 other soldiers. The detainee eventually was taken to Sarpuza prison in Kandahar, Afghanistan, where he was beaten and tortured by the Taliban, resulting in the loss of his two front teeth.
3. The detainee was in the Sarpuza prison for no less than five years. He was freed from prison by coalition forces when the Taliban fell from power.
4. After his release from the Sarpuza prison, the detainee became an officer in a military division assigned to patrol and protect the city of Jalalabad. The division was responsible for fighting smugglers of weapons and opium.
5. The detainee took seven of his men and weapons to the Kandaki Toupchi military base, where he was ordered to rotate with some of the men assigned there. Upon arriving at Kandaki Toupchi, the detainee was unable to locate the base commander, so he secured rooms for his group to spend the night.
6. The morning after his arrival at the compound, the detainee was arrested along with one other suspect, although other suspects escaped.
7. Mir Agha Jan was working as an intermediary to Qari Naqib, a senior Taliban leader, and coalition forces by way of the Afghan National Army (ANA). Qari Naqib was attempting to secure the release of the detainee and another unnamed man.
8. 'One of the detainee’s brother is named Mir Agha Jan.

The following primary factors favor release of transfer

a. The detainee adamantly denied any prior knowledge of the improvised explosive device]s (IEDs) found in Kandaki Toupchi post near the detainee’s room.
b. The detainee indicated that he did not support the Taliban or al Qaida forces.
c. The detainee expressed positive feelings towards the United States as he indicated that United States Forces in Afghanistan freed him from Sarpuza prison. He stated that from the beginning he took up arms to fight the Taliban and al Qaida forces.

== Transfer to Afghan prison ==
He was transferred to an Afghan prison on September 28, 2007, along with five others who were repatriated — 5 Afghans, a Libyan captive and a Yemeni captive.

The Center for Constitutional Rights reports that all of the Afghans repatriated to Afghanistan from April 2007 were sent to Afghan custody in the American-built and -supervised wing of the Pul-e-Charkhi prison near Kabul.
