= Umar Abdullah al-Kunduzi =

Afghanistani detainee in USA

Umar Abdullah Al Kunduzi
- Born: 1979 (age 46–47); Kunduz, Afghanistan
- Detained at: Guantanamo
- ISN: 222
- Status: Released

Umar Abdullah Al Kunduzi is a citizen of Afghanistan, who was held in extrajudicial detention in the United States Guantanamo Bay detention camps, in Cuba.

Joint Task Force Guantanamo counter-terrorism analysts estimate that Al Kunduzi was born in 1979, in Kunduz, Afghanistan.

The Chicago Tribune reports that although he was born in Afghanistan he lived most of his life in Saudi Arabia, where his parents were guest workers, before he returned to Afghanistan in 2001.

== Release ==
As of 2007, Umar Abdullah Al Kunduzi has been released from Guantanamo Bay

On November 25, 2008 the Department of Defense published a list of when Guantanamo captives were repatriated. According to that list he was repatriated on December 12, 2007.

The Center for Constitutional Rights reports that all of the Afghans repatriated to Afghanistan from April 2007 were sent to Afghan custody in the American-built and supervised wing of the Pul-e-Charkhi prison near Kabul.

== Post-detention life ==
The Chicago Tribune profiled Al Kunduzi on March 4, 2009. The article reported Afghan authorities detained him for a further four months after his repatriation. The article reported that Al Kunduzi acknowledged being present in Tora Bora as the Taliban regime collapsed. He told his interviewer that because he had been detained in Guantanamo he could not find work, and that former associates of his who remained loyal to the Taliban were pressuring him to join them.

When I say I am vulnerable, understand this—the policy of those on the other side is, 'You're with me, or you're against me.' One day, finally, they will come after me. That's why I want to disappear.
