= Mohammed Kamin =

Afghan detainee

- Born: 1978 (age 47–48); Khost Province, Afghanistan
- Detained at: Guantanamo
- ISN: 1045
- Charge: material support for terrorism
- Status: Released

Mohammed Kamin (born 1978) is a citizen of Afghanistan who was held in the United States Guantanamo Bay detention camps, in Cuba. The Joint Task Force Guantanamo estimate that Kamin was born in 1978. He was released and repatriated to Afghanistan by 23 December 2019.

== Charges before a Guantanamo Military Commission ==
On March 11, 2008, the Office of Military Commissions announced that Mohammed Kamin would face charges. The following day, Kamin was charged with a single count of "providing material support to terrorism." This charge made Kamin unique among the other prisoners at Guantanamo Bay because it has been said that that alone was not a war crime, and thus was probably not triable before a military commission.

On May 21, he refused to exit his cell to attend his arraignment. He was physically manacled and dragged into court nonetheless, where he stated that he had no connection to al-Qaeda or the Taliban. Kamin continued to refuse to attend his trial as late as June 2008.

On July 15, 2009, military prosecutors asked the commission to allow them to continue their case against Kamin until September 2009. The commission granted this request. Kamin continued to boycott proceedings against him, including a pre-trial hearing in November 2009. All charges were withdrawn and dismissed on December 8, 2009. Had he been convicted he could have faced life in prison.

== Transfer to the United Arab Emirates ==
Kamin was transferred to the United Arab Emirates with fourteen other individuals, including Obaidullah. Twelve of the men were Yemenis.

== Repatriation ==
Kamin was repatriated to Afghanistan by 23 December 2019.

== See also ==
- Boycott of Guantanamo Military Commissions
