= List of Iranian detainees at Guantanamo Bay =

The United States Department of Defense acknowledges holding 3 Iranian captives in Guantanamo.

A total of 779 captives have been held in extrajudicial detention in the Guantanamo Bay detention camps, in Cuba since the camps opened on January 11, 2002. The camp population peaked in 2004 at approximately 660. Only nineteen new captives, all "high value detainees" have been transferred there since the United States Supreme Court's ruling in Rasul v. Bush. As of July 2012, the camp population stands at approximately 168.

== Iranian captives acknowledged by the DoD ==
isn	name	arrival date	departure date	notes
555	Abdul Majid Muhammed	2002-05-05	2006-10-11	The only Christian in Guantanamo.; Accused of being a "watchman" for the Taliban.; Describes the militiamen who captured him being enormously excited that they had captured a foreigner who could be sold for a bounty.; Reports being a deserter, and a serious drug addict, and a street-level drug dealer.; Following the ouster of the Taliban his dealer sent him to Afghanistan, rather than his regular couriers, in return for paying off his substantial drug debt.; Reports his drug dealer had told him he had started to murder his children because he had not paid off his drug debt.
623	Bakhtiar Bameri	2002-06-18	2004-03-31	
676	Mohamed Anwar Kurd	2002-06-12	2005-08-19	Allegedly served on the front lines.; Allegedly trained at an Afghan military camp.; Allegedly tasked to assassinate Shia leaders back in Iran.
