= Ilkham Turdbyavich Batayev =

Former Guantanamo detainee from Kazakhstan

Ilkham Turdbyavich Batayev or Elham Battayav (born 7 November 1973) was held in extrajudicial detention in the United States Guantanamo Bay detainment camps, in Cuba. His Guantanamo Internment Serial Number was 84. He was born in Abaye, Kazakhstan.

Batayev was captured in Afghanistan in 2001 and he was transferred to Kazakhstan on 15 December 2006.

== Tom Johnson, Batayev's lawyer ==
On 9 August 2006 Batayev's lawyer, Tom Johnson, of Portland, Oregon, was profiled by the Willamette Week. Johnson remarked on how Batayev continued to keep his hopes up that he would eventually be released.

== Habeas corpus submissions ==
Elham Battayav is one of the sixteen Guantanamo captives whose amalgamated habeas corpus submissions were heard by US District Court Judge Reggie B. Walton on 31 January 2007.

== Release ==
The Portland, Oregon law firm Perkins Cole issued a press release on 18 December 2006 announcing Ihlkham Battayav's release. The press release stated:

The Perkins Coie team of Fortino, Tom Johnson and Cody Weston began representing Battayav, pro bono, in late 2004. The team made five trips to Guantanamo, numerous trips to the Kazakh embassy in Washington, D.C., and a trip to Kazakhstan to meet with his family, the Kazakh press and potential witnesses.

The Miami Herald reports that three of the four Kazakh detainees in Guantanamo were repatriated and set free on 21 December 2006. According to the Herald the two other released men were Abdullah Tohtasinovich Magrupov and Yakub Abahanov.

== McClatchy News Service interview ==
On 15 June 2008, the McClatchy News Service published a series of article based on interviews with 66 former Guantanamo captives. Ilkham Batayev was one of the men they interviewed. The McClatchy report stated that Ilkham Batayev said he couldn't bring himself to talk about his Guantanamo experiences, or how he came to be in Afghanistan.

But the McClatchy report characterized previous reports Ilkham Batayev had offered earlier—to a journalist in 2001, to his Tribunal, and to his lawyer—as inconsistent.

The McClatchy article quoted Ilkham Batayev's lawyer, Thomas R. Johnson Jr., about the credibility of his assertion that fighters in the Uzbekistan Islamic Movement could have kidnapped him, and press-ganged him, into involuntary service in Afghanistan. Johnson thought that the Tribunal officers discounted this part of his story as incredible, because it was outside their experience, and they simply couldn't imagine it was credible, in Kazakhstan, Uzbekistan or Afghanistan:

"He was kept at Guantanamo because U.S. officers at (his tribunal hearing) or the interrogators found this to be an outlandish account. Of course this doesn't happen: People aren't kidnapped and taken to other countries to fight wars."
