= List of Kazakhstani detainees at Guantanamo Bay =

- Nationality: Kazakhstani
- Number of detainess: 4
- Names: Ilkham Turdbyavich Batayev; Abdulrahim Kerimbakiyev; Yakub Abahanov; Abdallah Tohtasinovich Magrupov
- Status: Repatriated

The United States Department of Defense acknowledges holding four Kazakh detainees in Guantanamo. A total of 778 detainees have been held in extrajudicial detention in the Guantanamo Bay detention camps, in Cuba since the camps opened on January 11, 2002. The camp population peaked in 2004 at approximately 660. Only nineteen new detainees, all "high value detainees" have been transferred there since the United States Supreme Court's ruling in Rasul v. Bush. As of January 2008, the camp population stand at approximately 285.

== Release negotiations ==
Kazakhstan's First Deputy Foreign Minister Kairat Abuseitov confirmed, on January 16, 2003, that Kazakh security officials had interviewed two Kazakhstan citizens in Guantanamo. He described the two detainees as "young", and stated that Kazakhstan had appealed to the USA for their release.

In November 2003, the Central Asia Caucasus Institute Analyst reported that Kazakh Foreign Minister Qasymzhomart Toqaev Kazakhstan had been negotiated with the USA for the release of its citizens. The Minister stated:

... the situation is complicated by the admissions of some of the prisoners that they took part in military operations with the Taliban in Afghanistan.

== Kazakh detainees in Guantanamo ==
isn	name	page numbers	notes
84	Ilkham Turdbyavich Batayev	CSRT allegations / 4; CSRT transcript / 47-53; ARB 1 transcript / 116; ARB 1 decision / 58-64	Allegedly kidnapped and forced to prepare food for Taliban soldiers.; Repatriated on 18 December 2006.
521	Abdulrahim Kerimbakiyev	CSRT transcript / 1-9; ARB allegations / 43; ARB transcript / 136-137	Accused of being related to a terrorist suspect.; Accused of living in government housing in Afghanistan.; His statement to the Board is missing from his transcript.; Released December 21, 2006.
526	Yakub Abahanov	CSRT allegations / 48; ARB allegations / 85-88; ARB decision / 101-107	Captured with two friends from his home town.; Allegedly served as a cook for the Taliban.; Allegedly a member of a Uyghur mafia.; Allegedly a member of the East Turkistan Islamic Movement.; Released.
528	Abdallah Tohtasinovich Magrupov	CSRT transcript / 7-11	Captured with two friends from his home town.; Allegedly stayed at various madrassas during his travels around Pakistan.; Accused of being present in Afghanistan when the American aerial bombardment of Afghanistan began.; Released.

== Ambassador Ordway's 22 May 2007 press briefing ==
American ambassador John M. Ordway addressed the Kazakhstani detainees in Guantanamo during a May 22, 2007, press briefing at the Kazakhstani Press Club. Ordway confirmed that one detainee the USA considered a citizen of Kazakhstan remained in Guantanamo. He stated that it was against US policy to compensate former detainees. He asserted detainees were not detained any longer than necessary for US national security.

Question:
Ambassador Ordway:

What can you tell us about the fourth Kazakhstani still detained at the Guantanamo facility. Will the United States pay compensation if it turns out he violated no laws and was detained without cause?

With regard to the issue of compensation, we do not pay compensation for any of the enemy combatants who were in the Guantanamo facility.

With regard to the Kazakhstani citizen who is still there, as was the case before, I can't provide any details other than to say that we have been and will continue to be in discussion with the government of Kazakhstan about any possible release or return of their citizens.

There are many of these people, the reason they are released is because we do not have any particular charges. They were enemy combatants who were found in Afghanistan in circumstances that they were fighting with or participating with forces that were fighting U.S. forces and therefore were captured as enemy combatants. There was then a process to determine whether they represented any future threat. If not, as was the case with the three who were released, they are then released.

We also had a very extensive process to determine when there was no longer any reason to hold those people because they represented no further threat. That is exactly what happened with the three who were released and returned to Kazakhstan. They were no further threat.

== October 2008 repatriation ==
On October 31, 2008, the Department of Defense announced two detainees were repatriated to Kazakhstan and Tajikistan. The DoD withheld the two men's names.
