= Mubarak Hussain Bin Abul Hashem =

Bangladeshi Guantanamo detainee (born 1976)

- Born: 1976 (age 49–50); Moind, Brahmanbaria District, Bangladesh
- Arrested: 2002-01-17; Pakistan; American forces
- Released: 2006-12-15
- Citizenship: Bangladesh
- Detained at: Guantanamo
- ISN: 151
- Status: Transferred to Bangladesh
- Occupation: student

Mubarak Hussain Bin Abul Hashem is a citizen of Bangladesh who was held in extrajudicial detention in the United States Guantanamo Bay detainment camps, in Cuba. Joint Task Force Guantanamo counter-terrorism analysts estimate he was born in 1976, in Moind village, Majlishpur Union, Brahmanbaria Sadar Upazila, Bangladesh.

He was transferred to Guantanamo on January 17, 2002. He was repatriated to Bangladeshi custody on December 15, 2006.

== Study in Pakistan ==
Hashem's father, the Imam of the Graphics Art College Mosque in Mohammadpur in Dhaka, sent his son to Pakistan for further religious training in 1998, after he graduated from the Jamiya Rahmaniya Arabia Madrassah at Lalmatia in Dhaka. After two years of study at the Anwar-ul-Ulum Madrassah in Karachi, Abul Hashem's father said his son got a job teaching at the college where he had been studying, once he got his Mufti degree.

== Capture ==
Hashem's father reports that his son was teaching at a madrassa in Karachi when he disappeared in 2001. The Associated Press reported that Abul Hashem's family didn't know what had happened to him until 2004, when the Red Crescent informed them he was in Guantanamo. The Asian News International (ANI) press agency reports his family learned he was in Guantanamo in 2002.

The Daily Star reports Abul Hashem was captured when he emerged from a Pakistani mosque and asked for directions to Karachi. According to ANI, "A Pakistani intelligence officer captured him when he was again trying to enter Pakistan from the Afghan city of Jalalabad in 2001."

== Repatriation ==
Hashem was repatriated to Bangladeshi custody on December 17, 2006.

== Bangladeshi detention ==
Qatari newspaper The Peninsula quotes an unnamed Bangladeshi Police official, stating:

- "A magistrate of a special court has given him one-month detention late Friday for suspected anti-state activities."
- "During this time we will investigate whether he has any connection with international or local militant groups."
- "He went to Pakistan in late 1998 with a three-month tourist visa but overstayed there for more than two years before he was arrested by American intelligence officers."
