= Noor Habib Ullah =

Afghan Guantanamo detainee

- Born: 1980 (age 45–46); Jalalabad, Afghanistan
- Arrested: November 2001; Bamian Province, Afghanistan
- Detained at: Kandahar Internment Facility, Guantanamo
- ISN: 626
- Charge: No charge (extrajudicial detention)
- Status: Repatriated on 16 July 2003
- Occupation: truck driver

Noor Habib Ullah (born 1980) is a citizen of Afghanistan who was held in extrajudicial detention in the United States' Guantanamo Bay detention camps, in Cuba. Habibullah was one of three former captives who McClatchy Newspapers profiled; he also appeared in a BBC interview which claimed he was abused while interned at Bagram. His Guantanamo Internment Serial Number was 626.

Habibullah was repatriated on 16 July 2003.

== McClatchy News Service interview ==
On June 15, 2008 the McClatchy News Service published a series of articles based on interviews with 66 former Guantanamo captives.

Noor Habib was captured in November 2001 in Bamian Province when he and another man were transporting a shipment of goats. He said he was held by Afghan militia for several months, and then spent several months in the American Kandahar detention facility. He reported brutal beatings in both Afghan custody, and in Kandahar.

Noor Habib was transported to Guantanamo in mid-2002. Before he was released, in the summer of 2003, shortly before he was repatriated, he was told that he had been suspected of being a Taliban commander.

The McClatchy reporters had stated that the Afghan intelligence officials—who had previously confirmed to them when their records indicated if a former captive had ties to the Taliban or had been falsely denounced—had no records of Noor Habib.

Noor Habib said he had been a simple truck driver prior to his apprehension, in Bamian in November 2001, and he had no ties with the Taliban. He had spent four months in an Afghan detention facility in Bamian, where Afghans abused him, and had then spent several months in the Kandahar detention facility, where Americans abused him. He spent a year in Guantanamo, before two American officials informed him he had been mistaken for a senior Taliban official, and he was flown home.

== BBC interview ==
The BBC interviewed 27 former captives held in Bagram in June 2009. The BBC Report featured Noor Habib making a drawing of a man shackled to the ceiling, while the narrator said he described being chained to the ceiling with his feet suspended in freezing cold water.

== See also ==
- Bagram torture and prisoner abuse
