= Allah Muhammed Saleem =

Egyptian Guantanamo detainee

(Alaadin) Muhammed Saleem
- Born: January 13, 1967; Al-Bajoor, Egypt
- Detained at: Guantanamo Bay, Cuba
- Other names: Ala Abd Al Maqsut Muhammed Sagim Mazruh; Ala Abdel Maqsud Muhammad Salim
- ISN: 716
- Charge: Determined not to have been an enemy combatant after all
- Status: Seeking asylum in Albania

Allah Muhammed Saleem (also transliterated as Alaadinn Muhammad Salim) is a citizen of Egypt who was held in extrajudicial detention in the United States Guantanamo Bay detention camps, in Cuba. His Guantanamo Internment Serial Number was 716. Joint Task Force Guantanamo counter-terrorism analysts report that he was born on January 13, 1967, in Al-Bajoor, Egypt.

== Combatant Status Review ==
A Summary of Evidence memo was prepared for his tribunal. The memo accused him of the following:

a. The detainee is associated with al Qaida:
1. The detainee has been living under an alias while in detention and is in fact, a fairly significant member of Egyptian Islamic Jihad (EIJ) and al Qaida.
2. EIJ is an extremist group that merged with al Qaida.
3. In 1998, Doctor Ayman Al-Zawahiri merged EIJ into al Qaida, in effect making all EIJ members al Qaida members.
4. The detainee worked for a Bayt al Ansar safehouse in Peshawar, Pakistan (PK).
5. Bayt al Ansar refers to safehouses used to organize volunteers for Jihad.
6. The Bayt al Anser guesthouse served as a staging area for Mujahadeen on their way in and out of Afghanistan (AF).
7. The detainee set a pattern of traveling between Peshawar and Jalalabad, staying at Libyan guesthouses.
8. The detainee was captured with an admitted supporter of Libyan Islamic Fighting Group (LIFG).
9. LIFG is an extremist group with members aligned with al Qaida organization or active in the international Mujahadeen network.
10. The detainee was an employee of the International Islamic Relief Organization (IIRO).
11. The IIRO is a large Jeddah-based humanitarian aid organization that performs relief work worldwide, but also is used by Islamic terrorists and insurgents for cover, travel, and funding.
12. The detainee was a bodyguard for Usama Bin Ladin.
13. The detainee is prominent in the Usama Bin Ladin and Egyptian Islamic Jihad circles.
14. The detainee was apprehended during the "Greentown" raids on 3 April 2002, in Lahore, Pakistan.

On March 3, 2006, in response to a court order from Jed Rakoff the Department of Defense published a Summarized transcript from over 300 Tribunals. Saleem's transcript was not published on March 3, 2006. A three-page summarized transcript from the unclassified session of his Tribunal was published in September 2007, as part of his habeas corpus petition.

=== Allah Muhammed Saleem v. George W. Bush ===
A writ of habeas corpus, Allah Muhammed Saleem v. George W. Bush, was submitted on Allah Muhammed Saleem's behalf. In response, on 12 November 2005, the Department of Defense released 29 pages of unclassified documents related to his Combatant Status Review Tribunal to his lawyers. Those 29 pages were published in September 2007.

On January 13, 2005 Tribunal panel 30 determined he was not an "enemy combatant" after all.

=== Not an enemy combatant ===
Two of the three officers who sat on Tribunal panel 30, which convened to confirm or refute his status as an "enemy combatant" voted to recommend that he should not be considered an enemy combatant. The dissenting officer prepared a minority report, which was not published. The unclassified version of the Tribunal's report did not say why they discounted the allegations against him.

== Asylum in Albania ==
Like five of the Uyghur detainees in Guantanamo the government of Albania agreed to allow Salim to be transferred to Albania, and to apply for Asylum. Salim was transferred to a refugee center there on 17 November 2006. Salim has been visited, in Albania, by his American lawyers. Zari reports that Salim's family in Egypt are not accepting phone calls from either Salim, or his lawyers. According to Zari: "Salim pointed out that he was suffering from some health problems resulting from his torture in Guantanamo,"

== McClatchy interview ==
On June 15, 2008, the McClatchy News Service published articles based on interviews with 66 former Guantanamo captives. McClatchy reporters interviewed Abd al Maqsut Muhammad Sagim Mazruh. He reported being tortured.

The McClatchy report states he was held in the Bagram Theater Detention Facility prior to transfer to Guantanamo.

He has requested that his family be permitted to join him in Albania.
