= Fayiz Ahmad Yahia Suleiman =

Yemen citizen

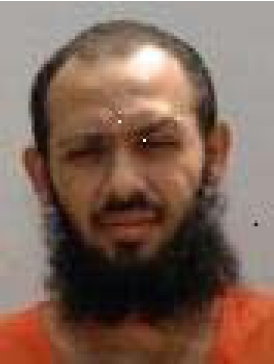
- Sulyman's Guantanamo identity portrait, showing him wearing the orange uniform issued to noncompliant individuals.
- Born: 1974 (age 50–51); Jeddah, Saudi Arabia
- Detained at: Guantanamo
- ISN: 153
- Charge(s): no charge, held in extrajudicial detention
- Status: transferred to Italy for resettlement

Fayiz Ahmad Yahia Suleiman is a citizen of Yemen who was held without charge in the Guantanamo Bay detention camps, in Cuba for 14 years and 160 days. He was transferred to Italy on July 10, 2016.

American intelligence analysts estimate Suleiman was born in 1974 in Jeddah, Saudi Arabia.

== Official status reviews ==
Originally the Bush Presidency asserted that captives apprehended in the "war on terror" were not covered by the Geneva Conventions, and could be held indefinitely, without charge, and without an open and transparent review of the justifications for their detention. In 2004 the United States Supreme Court ruled, in Rasul v. Bush, that Guantanamo captives were entitled to being informed of the allegations justifying their detention, and were entitled to try to refute them.

=== Office for the Administrative Review of Detained Enemy Combatants ===
Combatant Status Review Tribunals were held in a 3x5 meter trailer where the captive sat with his hands and feet shackled to a bolt in the floor.

Following the Supreme Court's ruling the Department of Defense set up the Office for the Administrative Review of Detained Enemy Combatants.

Scholars at the Brookings Institution, led by Benjamin Wittes, listed the captives still held in Guantanamo in December 2008, according to whether their detention was justified by certain common allegations:

- Fayiz Ahmad Yahia Suleiman was listed as one of the captives who "The military alleges ... are associated with both Al Qaeda and the Taliban."
- Fayiz Ahmad Yahia Suleiman was listed as one of the captives who "The military alleges ... took military or terrorist training in Afghanistan."
- Fayiz Ahmad Yahia Suleiman was listed as one of the captives who "The military alleges ... were at Tora Bora."
- Fayiz Ahmad Yahia Suleiman was listed as one of the captives whose "names or aliases were found on material seized in raids on Al Qaeda safehouses and facilities."
- Fayiz Ahmad Yahia Suleiman was listed as one of the captives who was an "al Qaeda operative".
- Fayiz Ahmad Yahia Suleiman was listed as one of the "82 detainees made no statement to CSRT or ARB tribunals or made statements that do not bear materially on the military's allegations against them."

=== Formerly secret Joint Task Force Guantanamo assessment ===
On April 25, 2011, whistleblower organization WikiLeaks published formerly secret assessments drafted by Joint Task Force Guantanamo analysts.

== Transfer to Italy ==
Suleiman was transferred to Italy, on July 10, 2016. The USA has not repatriated any individuals to Yemen, since 2009, due to security concerns.

Carol Rosenberg, writing in the Miami Herald, quoted Suleiman's attorney Jon Sands, who said Suleiman had never met with an attorney during his entire stay in Guantanamo.
