= List of Jordanian detainees at Guantanamo Bay =

Jordanian captives in Guantanamo
Date	January 11, 2002 – Present
Location	Guantanamo Bay detention camps, Cuba

The United States Department of Defense acknowledges holding eight Jordanian captives in Guantanamo. A total of 778 captives have been held in extrajudicial detention in the Guantanamo Bay detention camps, in Cuba since the camps opened on January 11, 2002 The camp population peaked in 2004 at approximately 660. Only nineteen new captives, all "high value detainees" have been transferred there since the United States Supreme Court's ruling in Rasul v. Bush. As of July 2012 the camp population was at approximately 170. This number had dropped to 40 by May 2018.

isn	name	arrival date	transfer date	notes
50	Zaid Muhamamd Sa'id Al Husayn	2002-01-17	2007-11-09	
169	Ayman Mohammad Silman Al Amrani	2002-02-13	2003-11-30	
589	Khalid Mahomoud Abdul Wahab Al Asmr	2002-07-15	2005-07-19	NLEC
651	Usama Hassan Ahmend Abu Kabir	2002-06-08	2007-11-02	
662	Ahmed Hassan Jamil Suleyman	2002-06-08	2007-11-02	
711	Hassan Khalil Mohamoud Abdul Hamid	2002-08-05	2003-11-18	
905	Jamil al-Banna	2003-02-07	2007-12-19	
1018	Osam Abdul Rahan Ahmad	2003-05-09	2004-03-31	
