= Shahzada (Guantanamo Bay detainee 952) =

Afghan Guantanamo detainee

- Born: 1959 (age 66–67); Belanday, Afghanistan
- Detained at: Guantanamo
- ISN: 952
- Charge: No charge (held in extrajudicial detention)
- Status: Cleared, determined never to have been an "enemy combatant" in the first place
- Occupation: landowner

Hajji Shahzada is a citizen of Afghanistan who was held in extrajudicial detention in the United States Guantanamo Bay detention camps, in Cuba. Shahzada's Guantanamo Internment Serial Number was 952. Joint Task Force Guantanamo counter-terrorism analysts estimate that Shahzada was born in 1959, in Belanday, Afghanistan.

Guantanamo detainee Abdullah Mohammad Khan's Combatant Status Review Tribunal dossier contains a letter from Shahzada. Khan was arrested while he was a guest of Shahzada.

== Combatant Status Review Tribunal ==
Combatant Status Review Tribunals were held in a trailer the size of a large RV. The captive sat on a plastic garden chair, with his hands and feet shackled to a bolt in the floor. Three chairs were reserved for members of the press, but only 37 of the 574 Tribunals were observed.

Initially the Bush administration asserted that they could withhold all the protections of the Geneva Conventions to captives from the war on terror. This policy was challenged before the Judicial branch. Critics argued that the USA could not evade its obligation to conduct a competent tribunals to determine whether captives are, or are not, entitled to the protections of prisoner of war status.

Subsequently, the Department of Defense instituted the Combatant Status Review Tribunals. The Tribunals, however, were not authorized to determine whether the captives were lawful combatants—rather they were merely empowered to make a recommendation as to whether the captive had previously been correctly determined to match the Bush administration's definition of an enemy combatant.

=== Summary of Evidence memo ===
A Summary of Evidence memo was prepared for Shahzada's Combatant Status Review Tribunal, on 12 January 2005. The memo listed the following allegations against him:

a. The detainee is associated with al Qaida and the Taliban.
1. The detainee was identified as working for the police force in Kabul, Afghanistan.
2. The detainee employed an associate as an Intelligence Agent.
3. The Intelligence Agent was arrested for his involvement with the detainee.
4. A former commander at Bagram, Shindand and Kandahar airfields, Abdullah Khan, also known as Kheirullah, visited with the detainee at his residence.
5. Abdullah Khan is alleged to have been a Taliban Airfield Commander.
6. Kheirullah was visiting to coordinate weapons movement for future operations against U.S./coalition forces and the current government.
7. Abdullah Khan commanded a group who planned an attack against United States forces.
8. The detainee was captured with Abdullah Khan at the detainee's residence along with two others on January 29, 2003, where they were reportedly plotting attacks against the U.S. and coalition forces.

=== Transcript ===
Shahzada chose to participate in his Combatant Status Review Tribunal. On March 3, 2006, in response to a court order from Jed Rakoff the Department of Defense published a nine-page summarized transcripts from his Combatant Status Review Tribunal.

== Determined not to have been an Enemy Combatant ==
The Washington Post reported that Shahzada was one of 38 detainees who was determined not to have been an enemy combatant during his Combatant Status Review Tribunal. They report that Shahzada had been released. The Department of Defense referred to these men as No Longer Enemy Combatants.
