= Abdul Razaq (Guantanamo detainee 356) =

Afghan Guantanamo detainee (born 1971)

- Born: 1971 (age 54–55); Tashkent
- Released: Afghanistan
- Detained at: Guantanamo
- Other name: Abdul Razeq
- ISN: 356
- Charge: No charge
- Status: Repatriated

Abdul Razaq (born 1971), a young Afghani man, was the first detainee to be released from the U.S. military detention facility at Guantanamo Bay, Cuba. Razaq was released after four months when officials determined that he was of no further intelligence value, nor a threat to the United States, and was affected by schizophrenia. Razaq was repatriated on May 11, 2002. Newsweek conducted an interview with Razeq in a high security mental institution on May 20, 2002.

Razaq, a member of the Uzbek ethnic group, said that he was captured because American authorities did not believe he was not a foreigner. Razak told U.S. military personnel on the day he was released that he was a heroin addict on the streets of Kandahar after the attacks of September 11, 2001, and that to support his habit he picked up an AK-47 for the Taliban. Once captured and brought to Gitmo, he became a cold turkey heroin addict in forced recovery, and off of his schizophrenia medication. These two facts led to his bizarre behavior at Camp X-Ray, and the nickname, "Wild Bill." Razaq was prone to "wild" behavior prior to his diagnosis and treatment before his release. He was observed eating his flip-flops, hanging objects from his genitals, causing verbal disruptions and throwing urine, feces and other bodily fluids at and on U.S. military police guards. This story is corroborated and discussed in the nonfiction autobiography, "Saving Grace at Guantanamo Bay: A Memoir of a Citizen Warrior," by Maj. (Ret.) Montgomery J. Granger. Granger was one of a small liaison detachment of the Joint Detainee Operations Group at Gitmo who were selected for Razaq's repatriation. Granger drove the HMMWV that took Razaq to his freedom bird, and spent several hours with Razaq, his colleagues, a psych nurse and interpreter prior to the arrival of his exit plane and had conversations with Razaq about his activities before being captured.

Razaq reported observing a hunger strike, and a detainee who tried to commit suicide. But he also reported that he was happy with the food he was served, and that the detainees were given Qu'rans and allowed to pray without interference.

== See also ==
- Geneva Conventions
- Human rights
