= Akhtiar Mohammad (Guantanamo detainee 1036) =

- Born: 1953 (age 72–73)
- Arrested: May 2003; Gardez, Afghanistan; United States military
- Released: December 2006; Afghanistan
- Citizenship: Afghanistan
- Detained at: Guantanamo Bay detainment camp
- ISN: 1036
- Status: Repatriated

Akhtiar Mohammad is a citizen of Afghanistan who was held in extrajudicial detention in the United States Guantanamo Bay detainment camps, in Cuba. His Guantanamo Internment Serial Number was 1036. Intelligence analysts estimate that Mohammad was born in 1953, in Kundarkhiel, Afghanistan.

== Release ==
Akhtiar testified that he had opposed the Taliban, and worked in partnership with the Karzai government, encouraging the United States to contact several of the newly installed Afghan ministers to vouch for his story.

Akhtiar's lawyer, Dicky Grigg, announced on December 28, 2006, that he had heard from Akhtiar, and learned he had been recently released.

Grigg received an email from the US Department of Justice on November 15, 2006. Grigg was advised that Akhtiar would be repatriated to Afghan custody in approximately 30 days. After making some inquiries Grigg learned that every Afghan who had been repatriated had been released.

Grigg spoke to Akhtiar by telephone on December 13, 2006.

== McClatchy News Service interview ==
On June 15, 2008, the McClatchy News Service published a series of articles based on interviews with 66 former Guantanamo captives. Akhtiar Mohammad was one of three former captives who had an article profiling him.

The McClatchy reporters had confirmed with Afghan intelligence officials that Akhtiar Mohammed was a supporter of the Karzai administration, and never should have been arrested.

Akhtiar Mohammed had been a tribal leader when the Taliban had come to power. He had gone to live in Pakistan to escape Taliban retribution for his failure to cooperate with their administration. He returned to Afghanistan after the Taliban had been overthrown, only to be denounced by a senior Taliban member who had won the trust of American officials. Akhtiar Mohammed and Mohammed Aman had described being the victims of Taliban and al Qaeda attacks while in Camp 4 in Guantanamo—the camp that was supposed to only contain the most compliant cooperative captives.
