= Khalid Mohammed Salih Al Dhuby =

Yemeni citizen

- Born: 1981 (age 44–45); Ta'if, Saudi Arabia
- Released: 2016-01-17; Ghana
- Detained at: Guantanamo
- ISN: 506
- Charge(s): No charge, held in extrajudicial detention
- Status: transferred to Ghana in January 2016

Khalid Mohammed Salih Al Dhuby is a citizen of Yemen, who was held in extrajudicial detention in the United States's Guantanamo Bay detention camps, in Cuba for almost fourteen years. His Guantanamo Internee Security Number is 506. American intelligence analysts estimate that Al Dhuby was born in 1981, in Ta'if, Saudi Arabia.

He was first recommended for release in 2006. He was transferred to Ghana with fellow Yemeni Mahmoud Omar Mohammed Bin Atef on January 7, 2016. The pair were the first individuals to be transferred to a sub-Saharan nation of which they were not a citizen.

== Official status reviews ==
Originally the Bush Presidency asserted that captives apprehended in the "war on terror" were not covered by the Geneva Conventions, and could be held indefinitely, without charge, and without an open and transparent review of the justifications for their detention. In 2004 the United States Supreme Court ruled, in Rasul v. Bush, that Guantanamo captives were entitled to being informed of the allegations justifying their detention, and were entitled to try to refute them.

=== Office for the Administrative Review of Detained Enemy Combatants ===
Combatant Status Review Tribunals were held in a 3x5 meter trailer where the captive sat with his hands and feet shackled to a bolt in the floor.

Following the Supreme Court's ruling the Department of Defense set up the Office for the Administrative Review of Detained Enemy Combatants.

Scholars at the Brookings Institution, led by Benjamin Wittes, listed the captives still held in Guantanamo in December 2008, according to whether their detention was justified by certain common allegations:

- Khalid Mohammed Salih Al Dhuby was listed as one of the captives who "The military alleges ... are associated with both Al Qaeda and the Taliban."
- Khalid Mohammed Salih Al Dhuby was listed as one of the captives who "The military alleges ... traveled to Afghanistan for jihad."
- Khalid Mohammed Salih Al Dhuby was listed as one of the captives who "The military alleges ... took military or terrorist training in Afghanistan."
- Khalid Mohammed Salih Al Dhuby was listed as one of the captives who "The military alleges ... were at Tora Bora."
- Khalid Mohammed Salih Al Dhuby was listed as one of the captives who was a foreign fighter.
- Khalid Mohammed Salih Al Dhuby was listed as one of the "82 detainees made no statement to CSRT or ARB tribunals or made statements that do not bear materially on the military’s allegations against them."

=== Formerly secret Joint Task Force Guantanamo assessment ===
On April 25, 2011, whistleblower organization WikiLeaks published formerly secret assessments drafted by Joint Task Force Guantanamo analysts. His 9-page Joint Task Force Guantanamo assessment was drafted on December 25, 2006. It was signed by camp commandant Rear Admiral Harry B Harris Jr. He recommended transfer to another country.

== Transfer to Ghana ==
Al Dhudy and Mohammed Bin Atef were transferred to Ghana on January 7, 2016. The transfer stirred controversy, within Ghana.

Eventually it became known that the government of Ghana had assured the USA that they would prevent the men from leaving Ghana for two years.
