= Alif Khan =

Former Guantanamo detainee

- Born: 1968 (age 57–58); Khowst, Afghanistan
- Released: 23 March 2003
- Detained at: Guantanamo
- ISN: 673
- Charge: No charge (held in extrajudicial detention)
- Status: Repatriated

Alif Khan (born 1968) is a citizen of Afghanistan who was held in extrajudicial detention in the United States' Guantanamo Bay detention camps, in Cuba. His Guantanamo Internment Serial Number was 673.

He was repatriated on 23 March 2003.

== McClatchy News Service interview ==
On 15 June 2008, the McClatchy News Service published a series of articles based on interviews with 66 former Guantanamo captives. Alif Khan was one of the former captives who had an article profiling him.

Alif Khan told his McClatchy interviewer that he had to move to Kabul after his repatriation because his early release put him at risk from local Taliban in his home area. They had approached him, upon his return to Khost, and told him he should travel to Waziristan and fight with the Taliban. When he declined he started receiving death threats.

He said that he was apprehended by Afghan troops in early 2002, while traveling from Khost to Kabul. He said the same corrupt troops had stopped him a few days earlier, and had released him in return for a bribe. The troops who arrested him were under the overall command of warlord Abdullah Mujahid, who was later sent to Guantanamo himself.

Alif Khan said he never knew why had been sent to Guantanamo. He had been issued a laminated card when he was repatriated to Afghanistan. He showed it to his interviewer, and asked for an explanation of what it said. It said:

"This individual has been determined to pose no threat to the United States military or its interests in Afghanistan."

Alif Khan had been held in the Kandahar detention facility and the Bagram Theater Internment Facility prior to being sent to Guantanamo.

The McClatchy reporter speculated that Alif Khan's early release was either a sign analysts determined he was completely innocent, or that the allegations against him were not regarded as serious.

== BBC Panorama: Inside Guantanamo ==
In October 2003, A BBC1 television reporter, Vivian White, attempted to put human faces on 'terrorism suspects' who had been 'disappeared' in America's war on terrorism. One of the human faces she chose was Alif Khan, an Afghan businessman who was arrested when the taxi he was riding in was stopped by local forces. Khan described his transportation to Guantanamo: "They put cuffs and tape on my hands, taped my eyes, they taped my ears. They gagged me. They put chains on my legs and chains around my belly. They injected me. I was unconscious. I don’t know how they transported me." White also described how Khan has struggled to rebuild his life after his release.
