= Jon Mohammad Barakzai =

Afghan former Guantanamo Bay detainee

- Detained at: Guantanamo
- Other name: Jan Mohammed
- ISN: 107
- Status: One of the first captives to be repatriated, in 2002.

Jon Mohammad Barakzai is an Afghan man who was held in extrajudicial detention in the United States Guantanamo Bay detention camps, in Cuba. Mohammed was repatriated in October 2002, together with three elderly men, two Afghanis and a Pakistani. The men described being chained, for hours, during their interrogations.

Mohammed said that he had been forcibly conscripted into the Taliban army, at gunpoint. Some press reports stated that Mohammed, and the three elderly detainees released with him, were the first detainees to be released.

Mohammed said he recognized some high level Taliban leaders in the camp, such as Abdul Salam Zaeef, a former ambassador. He said that the detainees were shackled every time they were removed from their cells.

Mohammed's companions said that they had no contact with their family during their American custody. Mohammed said he received a letter from his family just three days before his release.

== The McClatchy interview ==
After a long legal battle the Department of Defense complied with a court order from US District Court Justice Jed Rakoff to release the names of all the Guantanamo detainees. The DoD released a list of all the captives who had been detained, in military custody, in Guantanamo. The name "Jan Mohammed" is missing from that list. On June 15, 2008, the McClatchy News Service published articles based on interviews with 66 former Guantanamo captives. McClatchy identified Jan Mohammed as Guantanamo captive 107, listed as "Jon Mohammad Barakzai".

Mohammed described being sent to Sherberghan prison by General Dostum, where:

Some died because of lack of food; others were killed by Dostum's soldiers" at Sherberghan, Mohammed said. "When one of his soldiers thought that someone looked like they were with the Taliban, they would take him outside and beat him with big pieces of wood until he died.

Jan Mohammed described abuse while in the Afghan custody that preceded his US custody. He said he had to move, after he returned to Afghanistan, because local Taliban sympathizers suspected his early release was a sign that he was a US spy, or had collaborated with them.
