= List of Yemeni detainees at Guantanamo Bay =

The United States has held a total of 115 Yemeni citizens at Guantanamo Bay, forty-two of whom have since been transferred out of the facility. Only Afghanistan and Saudi Arabia had a greater number of their citizens held in the Guantanamo Bay detention camp. By January 2008, the Yemenis in Guantanamo represented the largest group of detainees.

Among the Yemeni detainees currently held (as of November 2015), 44 are recommended for transfer out of the facility, while twenty-three are being held indefinitely and are not recommended for transfer. Only Ali Hamza Ahmad Suliman al Bahlul was convicted by military tribunal. Two of his convictions were vacated on appeal but a third, for conspiracy, was restored in 2016 en banc by a plurality of justices on the United States Court of Appeals for the D.C. Circuit. Two Yemeni detainees are awaiting trials by military commissions, Ramzi bin al-Shibh and Walid Bin Attash.

== Events ==
A delegation of Yemeni officials visited Guantanamo shortly after it opened in January 2002.

On March 12, 2008, Mark Falkoff of the Center for Constitutional Rights issued a call for the repatriation of the Yemeni detainees, reporting that 95 Yemenis remained in detention, and they now constituted more than a third of the total detainee population. Falkoff wrote that the delay in his release is due to a failure of the United States and Yemeni governments to reach an agreement on the security arrangements for the detainees, following their repatriation. By contrast, almost all the 133 Saudi detainees in Guantanamo had been sent home in 2006 and 2007.

=== Impact of Umar Farouk Abdulmutallab's alleged attempted suicide bombing ===
On December 25, 2009, Nigerian Umar Farouk Abdulmutallab (whose mother is from Yemen) allegedly tried to set off a suicide bomb on Northwest Airlines Flight 253. By December 27, 2009, responding to rumors that Abdulmutallab had confessed to being trained and equipped in Yemen, various American politicians, including Joe Lieberman, Pete Hoekstra, Peter T. King and Bennie Thompson, called for American president Barack Obama to halt plans to repatriate the Yemenis.

=== Repatriation negotiations ===
An article published in the Yemen Post on November 13, 2012, reported on secret terms in the US-Yemeni repatriation negotiations.

== Repatriated detainees ==
Several returned Yemeni detainees were charged and stood trial, following their repatriation. Yemen established a special Criminal Court for Terrorism where their trials took place.

On 7 June 2008, the Yemeni site Al Sahwa Net reported that negotiations were advanced for the repatriation of approximately seventy Yemeni detainees. That same day, Yemen Online reported that several Yemeni detainees had recently been allowed to their first phone calls to their families.

== List of Yemeni detainees in Guantanamo ==
ISN	Mug shot/Portrait	Name	Arrival date	Departure date	Notes	Transfer recommendation status
00026		Fahed Abdullah Ahmad Ghazi	2002-01-11	2016-01-13	transferred to Oman	2010 Guantanamo Review Task Force recommended transfer
00027		Uthman Abdul Rahim Mohammed Uthman	2002-12-11	2025-01-06	received habeas corpus	2010 Guantanamo Review Task Force recommended continued detention
00028		Muaz Hamza Ahmad Al Alawi	2002-01-17	2025-01-06	transferred to Oman	2010 Guantanamo Review Task Force recommended continued detention
00029		Muhammad Ahmad Abdallah Al Ansi	2002-01-16	2017-01-16	transferred to Oman	2010 Guantanamo Review Task Force recommended continued detention
00030		Ahmed Umar Abdullah al Hikimi	2002-01-16	2016-04-16	Saudi Arabia	2010 Guantanamo Review Task Force recommended transfer
00031		Mahmoud Abd Al Aziz Abd Al Mujahid	2002-01-12	2016-08-15	transferred to the United Arab Emirates	201x Periodic Review Board recommended transfer
00032		Faruq Ali Ahmed	2002-01-11	2009-12-19	transferred	
00033		Mohammed Ahmad Said Al Edah	2002-01-17	2016-08-15	transferred to the United Arab Emirates	2010 Guantanamo Review Task Force recommended transfer
00034		Al Khadr Abdallah Muhammed Al Yafi	2002-01-17	2015-01-14	transferred to Oman	2010 Guantanamo Review Task Force recommended transfer
00035		Idris Ahmed Abdu Qader Idris	2002-06-08	2015-06-13	transferred to Oman	2010 Guantanamo Review Task Force recommended transfer
00036		Ibrahim Othman Ibrahim Idris	2002-01-11	2013-12-18		2010 Guantanamo Review Task Force recommended transfer
00037		Abd al Malik Abd al Wahab	2002-01-11	2016-06-22	granted asylum in Montenegro	2014 Periodic Review Board recommended transfer
00039		Ali Hamza Ahmed Suleiman Al Bahlul	2002-01-11			serving his sentence in Guantanamo
00040		Abdel Qadir Hussein Al Mudhaffari	2002-01-14	2016-08-15	transferred to the United Arab Emirates	2010 Guantanamo Review Task Force recommended transfer
00041		Majid Mahmud Abdu Ahmad	2002-01-17	2016-08-15	transferred to the United Arab Emirates	2010 Guantanamo Review Task Force recommended continued detention
00043		Samir Naji Al Hasan Moqbel	2002-01-11	2016-01-13	transferred to Oman	2010 Guantanamo Review Task Force recommended transfer
00044		Mohammed Rajab Sadiq Abu Ghanim	2002-01-11	2017-01-05	transfer	2010 Guantanamo Review Task Force recommended continued detention
00045		Ali Ahmad Muhammad Al Rahizi	2002-01-11	2015-11-16	transferred to the United Arab Emirates.	
00069		Sadeq Muhammad Sa'id Ismail		2007-06-18		2004-11-12 JTF-GTMO DAB recommended transfer
00078		Mohammad Ahmed Abdullah Saleh Al Hanashi	2002-02-08	2009-06-01	died in custody	2008-06-10 JTF-GTMO DAB recommended continued detention
00088		Waqas Mohammed Ali Awad	2002-01-20	2016-01-13	transferred to Oman	2010 Guantanamo Review Task Force recommended transfer
00091		Abdul Al Saleh	2002-02-09	2016-08-15	transferred to the United Arab Emirates	2010 Guantanamo Review Task Force recommended transfer
00115		Abdul Rahman Mohamed Saleh Naser	2002-06-12	2016-04-16	Saudi Arabia	2010 Guantanamo Review Task Force recommended transfer
00117		Muktar Yahya Najee Al Warafi	2002-05-01	2016-01-13	transferred to Oman	2010 Guantanamo Review Task Force recommended transfer
00128		Ghaleb Nassar Al Bihani	2002-01-17	2017-01-16	transferred to Oman	201x Periodic Review Board recommended transfer
00129		Toufiq Saber Muhammad Al Marwa'i	2002-06-12	2006-12-15	transferred	2005-01-07 JTF-GTMO DAB recommended transfer
00131		Salem Ahmed Hadi	2002-01-20	2017-01-05	transfer	2010 Guantanamo Review Task Force recommended continued detention
00149		Salim Ahmed Hamdan	2002-05-01	2008-11-25	transferred to serve sentence	2008-09-04 JTF-GTMO DAB recommended continued detention
00152		Asim Thahit Abdullah Al Khalaqi	2002-01-17	2014-12-30	asylum	2010 Guantanamo Review Task Force recommended transfer; died in Kazakhstan shortly after his transfer
00153		Fayiz Ahmad Yahia Suleiman	2002-01-17	2016-07-10		transferred to Italy.
00156		Allal Ab Aljallil Abd Al Rahman Abd	2002-01-17	2012-09-10	died in custody	2010 Guantanamo Review Task Force recommended transfer
00162		Ali Husayn Abdullah Al Tays	2002-02-09	2006-12-15	transfer	2004-10-08 JTF-GTMO DAB recommended transfer
00163		Khalid Abd Jal Jabbar Muhammad Juthman Al Qadasi	2002-02-09	2015-11-16	transferred to the United Arab Emirates.	2010 Guantanamo Review Task Force recommended transfer
00165		Adil Said Al Haj Obeid Al Busayss	2002-01-17	2015-11-16	transferred to the United Arab Emirates.	2010 Guantanamo Review Task Force recommended transfer
00167		Ali Yahya Mahdi Al Raimi	2002-05-01	2016-04-16	Saudi Arabia	2010 Guantanamo Review Task Force recommended transfer
00170		Sharaf Ahmad Muhammad Masud	2002-06-08	2015-06-13	transferred to Oman	2010 Guantanamo Review Task Force recommended transfer
00171		Abu Bakr Ibn Ali Muhhammad Alahdal	2002-01-14	2016-01-13	transferred to Oman	2010 Guantanamo Review Task Force recommended transfer
00172		Ali Muhammed Nasir	2002-01-14	2007-09-28	transferred	2004-10-28 JTF-GTMO DAB recommended transfer
00178		Tarek Ali Abdullah Ahmed Baada	2002-02-09	2016-04-16	unknown	2010 Guantanamo Review Task Force recommended transfer
00183		Issam Hamid Al Bin Ali Al Jayfi	2002-01-17	2006-12-15	transferred	2004-10-29 JTF-GTMO DAB recommended transfer
00193		Muhsin Muhammad Musheen Moqbill	2002-05-03	2006-12-15	transferred	2004-10-01 JTF-GTMO DAB recommended transfer
00198		Mohammed Ahmed Ali Al Asadi	2002-05-01	2006-12-15	transferred	2004-09-17 JTF-GTMO DAB recommended transfer
00202		Mahmmoud Omar Mohammed Bin Atef	2002-02-07	2016-01-06	transferred to Ghana	
00221		Ali Mohsen Salih	2002-02-11	2007-06-18	transfer	2004-09-17 JTF-GTMO DAB recommended transfer
00223		Abdul Rahman Abdul Abu Ghiyth Sulayman	2002-02-11	2016-08-15	transferred to the United Arab Emirates	2010 Guantanamo Review Task Force recommended transfer
00224		Abd Al Rahman Abdullah Ali Muhammad	2002-02-09	2015-01-14	transferred to Oman	2010 Guantanamo Review Task Force recommended transfer
00225		Hani Abdul Muslih Al Shulan	2002-02-09	2007-06-18	transferred	2004-10-15 JTF-GTMO DAB recommended transfer died in Yemen in 2009.
00233		Abdul Al Razzaq Muhammad Salih	2002-02-11	2016-01-13	transferred to Oman	2010 Guantanamo Review Task Force recommended transfer
00235		Saeed Ahmed Mohammed Abdullah Sarem Jarabh	2002-02-11	2016-08-15	transferred to the United Arab Emirates	2010 Guantanamo Review Task Force recommended transfer
00240		Abdullah Yahia Yousf al Shabli	2002-02-07	2017-01-05	transferred	
00242		Khaled Qasim	2002-05-01	2025-01-06	transferred to Oman	2010 Guantanamo Review Task Force recommended continued detention
00249		Mohammed Abdullah Al Hamiri		2016-04-16	Saudi Arabia	2010 Guantanamo Review Task Force recommended transfer
00251		Muhhammad Said Bin Salem	2002-02-07	2016-01-13	transferred to Oman	2010 Guantanamo Review Task Force recommended transfer
00252		Yasim Muhammed Basardah	2002-02-12	2010-05-04		?
00254		Muhammad Ali Hussein Khenaina	2002-06-08	2014-12-30		?
00255		Said Muhammed Salih Hatim	2002-06-12	2016-01-13	transferred to Oman	2010 Guantanamo Review Task Force recommended transfer
00256		Atag Ali Abdoh Al-Haj	2002-06-12	2009-12-19		?
00259		Fadil Husayn Salih Hintif	2002-02-09	2015-01-14	transferred to Oman	
00321		Ahmed Yaslam Said Kuman	2002-05-03	2016-04-16	Saudi Arabia	
00324		Mashur Abdallah Muqbil Ahmed Al Sabri	2002-05-01	2016-04-16	Saudi Arabia	
00434		Mustafa Abdul Qawi Abdul Aziz Al Shamyri	2002-06-12	2017-01-16	transferred to Oman	
00440		Mohammed Ali Abdullah Bwazir	2002-05-01	2017-01-05	transferred	
00441		Abdul al-Rahman al-Ziahri	2002-02-09	2016-07-11	transferred to Serbia	
00461		Abdul Rahman Umir Al Qyati	2002-05-03	2016-04-16	Saudi Arabia	
00498		Mohammed Ahmed Said Haidel	2002-05-03	2017-01-16	transferred to Oman	
00503		Saleh Mohamed Al Zuba	2002-06-08	2006-12-15		?
00506		Khalid Mohammed Salih Al Dhuby	2002-05-05	2016-01-06	transferred to Ghana	
00508		Salman Yahya Hassan Mohammed Rabeii	2002-05-01	2017-01-16	transferred to Oman	
00509		Mohammed Nasir Yahya Khusruf	2002-05-03	2016-08-15	transferred to the United Arab Emirates	
00511		Sulaiman Awath Sulaiman Bin Ageel Al Nahdi	2002-05-05	2015-11-16	transferred to the United Arab Emirates.	
00522		Yasin Qasem Muhammad Ismail	2002-05-01			?
00549		Omar Said Salim Al Dayi	2002-02-15	2016-01-13	transferred to Oman	?
00550		Walid Said Bin Said Zaid	2002-05-03	2017-01-16	transferred to Oman	
00553		Abdul Khaled Al-Baydani	2002-05-01	2014-11-20		?
00554		Fahmi Salem Said Al Sani	2002-02-15	2015-11-16	transferred to the United Arab Emirates.	
00564		Jalal Salam Bin Amer	2002-06-14	2015-06-13	transferred to Oman	
00566		Mansour Muhammed Ali Al-Qatta	2002-06-18	2016-04-16	Saudi Arabia	
00569		Zuhail Abdo Anam Said Al Sharabi	2002-05-05	2025-01-06	transferred to Oman	?
00570		Sabri Mohammed Ebrahim Al Qurashi	2002-05-05	2014-12-30		?
00574		Hamoud Abdullah Hamoud Hassan Al Wady	2002-06-08	2013-12-16		?
00575		Saad Masir Mukbl Al Azani	2002-06-18	2015-06-13	transferred to Oman	
00576		Zahar Omar Hamis Bin Hamdoun	2002-05-05	2016-08-15	transferred to the United Arab Emirates	
00577		Jamal Muhammad Alawi Mar'i	2002-05-01	2009-12-19		?
00578		Abdul Aziz Abdullah Ali Al Suadi	2002-05-03			?
00586		Karam Khamis Sayd Khamsan	2002-05-01	2005-08-19		?
00627		Ayman Saeed Abdullah Batarfi	2002-05-01	2009-12-19		?
00678		Fawaz Naman Hamoud Abdallah Mahdi	2002-06-18	2007-06-18		?
00679		Mohmmad Ahmad Ali Tahar	2002-06-14	2009-12-19		?
00680		Emad Abdalla Hassan	2002-06-18	2015-06-13	transferred to Oman	
00681		Mohammed Mohammed Hassen	2002-06-18	2010-07-13	received habeas corpus	
00683		Fayad Yahya Ahmed	2002-06-18	2009-12-19		?
00686		Abdel Ghalib Ahmad Hakim	2002-06-18	2014-11-20		?
00688		Fahmi Abdullah Ahmed	2002-06-18			?
00689		Mohammed Ahmed Salam	2002-06-18	2015-01-14	transferred to Oman	
00690		Ahmed Abdul Qader	2002-06-18	2015-01-14	transferred to Estonia	
00691		Mohammed Ali Salem Al Zarnuki	2002-06-18	2015-06-13	transferred to Oman	
00692		Ali Bin Ali Aleh	2002-06-18	2009-09-26		?
00693		Ali Abdullah Ahmed	2002-06-18	2006-06-10	died in custody	
00728		Jamil Ahmed Said Nassir	2002-08-05	2016-08-15	transferred to the United Arab Emirates	
00836		Ayoub Murshid Ali Saleh	2002-10-28	2016-08-15	transferred to the United Arab Emirates	
00837		Bashir Nashir Al-Marwalah	2002-10-28	2016-08-15	transferred to the United Arab Emirates	
00838		Shawki Awad Balzuhair	2002-10-28	2016-12-04	transferred to Cape Verde.	
00839		Musab Omar Ali Al Mudwani	2002-10-28	2017-01-16	transferred to Oman	
00840		Ha Il Aziz Ahmed Al Maythali	2002-10-28	2017-01-16	transferred to Oman	
00841		Sa id Salih Sa id Nashir	2002-10-28	2025-01-06	transferred to Oman	?
00893		Tawfiq Nasir Awad al Bihani	2003-02-07	2025-01-06	transferred to Oman	
01014		Walid Mohammed Shahir	2003-05-09	2004-03-31		?
01015		Hussein Salem Mohammed	2003-05-09	2014-11-20		?
01017		Omar Mohammed Ali Al Rammah	2003-05-09	2025-01-06	transferred to Oman	?
01453		Sanad Ali Yislam Al-Kazimi	2004-09-20	2025-01-06	transferred to Oman	?
01456		Hassan Mohammed Ali Bin Attash	2004-09-20	2025-01-06	transferred to Oman	?
01457		Al Hajj Abdu Ali Sharqawi	2004-09-20	2025-01-06	transferred to Oman	?
01463		Abdul Al Salam Al Hilah	2004-09-20	2025-01-06	transferred to Oman	?
10013		Ramzi bin al-Shibh	2006-09-05			?
10014		Walid bin 'Attash	2006-09-05			?

== See also ==
- Timeline of the release and transfer of Guantanamo Bay detainees
- Al-Asadi v. Bush
