= Periodic Review Board =

United States status review system for its Guantanamo Bay detainees

The Periodic Review Boards administrate a US "administrative procedure" for recommending whether certain individuals held in the Guantanamo Bay detention camps, in Cuba are safe to release or transfer, or whether they should continue to be held without charge. The boards are authorized by and overseen by the Periodic Review Secretariat, which President Barack Obama set up with Executive Order 13567 on March 7, 2011.

Senior Civil Service officials from six agencies sit on the Board: the United States Department of Defense, Homeland Security, Justice and State, and the offices of the Chairman of the Joint Chiefs of Staff and the Director of National Intelligence. Each member has a veto over any recommendation. Although Obama authorized the Secretariat to conduct periodic reviews in early 2011, the first review was not conducted until late 2013.

On July 21, 2013, Carol Rosenberg, writing in the Miami Herald, reported that the announcement that the Boards would finally be convened followed a "flurry of emails" to the captives' attorneys—after years of delay. Rosenberg noted that the announcement from Norton C. Joerg, a former officer and senior lawyer with the United States Navy, came at the height of the most widespread Guantanamo hunger strike.

Individuals who have faced charges, become eligible to have their status reviewed by a Periodic Review Board, if the charges they faced are dropped. In 2013, 24 new individuals who the Guantanamo Review Task Force had recommended should face charges, had those charges dropped, and became eligible for review, when appeals courts had overturned convictions for "providing material support for terrorism".

During the second review, on January 28, 2014, that of Abdel Malik al Rahabi, nine reporters and four human rights workers were allowed to observe a video-link to the 19 minute unclassified portion of the hearing. 69 other individuals can expect to have their status reviewed.

Almost half of the individuals still at Guantanamo have already been cleared for release or transfer—some as long ago as 2005, so critics have questioned how meaningful it had been to clear Mahmud Abd Al Aziz Al Mujahid for release.

Under the Obama Administration, the Board examined 63 detainees, recommending 37 of those to be transferred.

Of the 693 total former detainees transferred out of Guantanamo, 30% are suspected or confirmed to have reengaged in terrorist activity. Of those detainees that were transferred out under President Obama, 5.6% are confirmed and 6.8% are suspected of reengaging in terrorist activity.

The Board held its first hearing under President Donald Trump on February 9, 2017. Warning of the danger of recidivism, that same day eleven Republican Senators wrote a letter encouraging the President to immediately suspend the Board and to prohibit the transfer of any detainees.

On February 6, 2018, the first full review during the Trump administration took place. Khalid Ahmed Qasim had had four file reviews since his first full review, on March 6, 2015.

== Timeline ==
Periodic Review timeline
| isn | date | event | |
|---|---|---|---|
| | 2011-03-07 | In Executive Order 13567 President Obama authorizes the Periodic Review Secretariat. | |
| | 2013-07-25 | Mahmud Abd Al Aziz Al Mujahid and Abdel Malik Ahmed Abdel Wahab Al Rahabi are the first two individuals to be advised they would have a PRB convened to review the Guantanamo Review Task Force determination that they were too dangerous to release—even though the evidence to charge them with a crime did not exist. | |
| | 2013-09-25 | Ali Ahmad al-Razihi and Ghaleb Nassar Al Bihani are advised they would have a PRB convened to review the Guantanamo Review Task Force determination that they were too dangerous to release. | |
| 31 | 2013-11-20 | Mahmud Abd Al Aziz Al Mujahid's Board convenes. No observers are allowed. The Board recommends that he is no longer too dangerous to release. | |
| 37 | 2014-01-28 | Abdel Malik Ahmed Abdel Wahab Al Rahabi's Board convenes. His is the first Guantanamo review of any kind where human rights observers are allowed. Four human rights workers and nine journalists are allowed to watch the first 19 minutes of his review. The Board recommends continued detention at Guantanamo, with another review in six months. | |
| 131 | 2014-01-28 | Salem Ahmad Hadi Bin Kanad is advised he will have a PRB convened to review the Guantanamo Review Task Force determination that they were too dangerous to release. | |
| | 2014-02-11 | Muhammed Abd Al Rahman Awn Al-Shamrani and Faez Mohammed Ahmed Al-Kandari. are advised they would have a PRB convened to review the Guantanamo Review Task Force determination that they were too dangerous to release. | |
| 232 | 2014-02-12 | Fouzi Khalid Abdullah Al Awda is advised he will have a PRB convened to review the Guantanamo Review Task Force determination that they were too dangerous to release. | |
| 713 | 2014-02-26 | Muhammad Murdi Issa Al-Zahrani is advised he will have a PRB convened to review the Guantanamo Review Task Force determination that they were too dangerous to release. | |
| 45 | 2014-03-20 | Ali Ahmad al-Razihi's Board convenes. | |
| 128 | 2014-04-08 | Ghaleb Nassar Al Bihani's Review is scheduled for this date. | |
| 128 | 2014-05-28 | Ghaleb Nassar Al Bihani's Review Board publishes its recommendation that he should be cleared for release. | |
| 232 | 2014-06-04 | Fouzi Khalid Abdullah Al Awda's Review is scheduled for this date. | |
| 552 | 2014-07-14 | Faez Mohammed Ahmed Al-Kandari | |
| 713 | 2014-10-03 | Muhammad Murdi Issa Al-Zahrani | |
| 535 | 2015-02-12 | Tariq Mahmoud Ahmed Al Sawah | |
| 235 | 2015-03-18 | Saeed Ahmed Mohammed Abdullah Sarem Jarabh | The PRB published the decision to recommend a clearance to release. |
| 324 | | Mashur Abdullah Muqbil Ahmed Al-Sabri | |
| 242 | 2015-03-18 | Khaled Quasim | The PRB recommended continued detention. |
