= Muktar Yahya Najee al-Warafi =

Muktar Yahya Najee Al Warafi
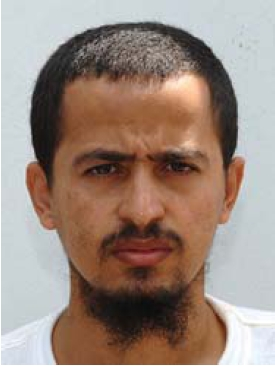
- Muktar's Guantanamo identity portrait, showing him wearing a white uniform issued to "compliant" individuals.
- Born: 1974 (age 51–52); Taiz, Yemen
- Detained at: Guantanamo
- ISN: 117
- Charge: no charges extrajudicial detention
- Status: Transferred to Oman in 2016

Muktar Yahya Najee Al Warafi is a citizen of Yemen who was held in extrajudicial detention in the United States Guantanamo Bay detainment camps in Cuba. The Department of Defense estimate that Al Warafi was born in 1974, in Taiz, Yemen.

Muktar Yahya Najee al Warafi was held at Guantanamo from 2002 to January 13, 2016.

== Official status reviews ==
Originally the Bush Presidency asserted that captives apprehended in the "war on terror" were not covered by the Geneva Conventions, and could be held indefinitely, without charge, and without an open and transparent review of the justifications for their detention. In 2004, the United States Supreme Court ruled, in Rasul v. Bush, that Guantanamo captives were entitled to being informed of the allegations justifying their detention, and were entitled to try to refute them.

=== Office for the Administrative Review of Detained Enemy Combatants ===
Combatant Status Review Tribunals were held in a 3x5 meter trailer where the captive sat with his hands and feet shackled to a bolt in the floor.

Following the Supreme Court's ruling the Department of Defense set up the Office for the Administrative Review of Detained Enemy Combatants.

Scholars at the Brookings Institution, led by Benjamin Wittes, listed the captives still held in Guantanamo in December 2008, according to whether their detention was justified by certain common allegations:

- Muktar Yahya Najee Al Warafi was listed as one of the captives who "The military alleges ... are associated with the Taliban."
- Muktar Yahya Najee Al Warafi was listed as one of the captives who "The military alleges ... traveled to Afghanistan for jihad."
- Muktar Yahya Najee Al Warafi was listed as one of the captives who "The military alleges ... took military or terrorist training in Afghanistan."
- Muktar Yahya Najee Al Warafi was listed as one of the captives who "The military alleges ... fought for the Taliban."
- Muktar Yahya Najee Al Warafi was listed as one of the captives whose "names or aliases were found on material seized in raids on Al Qaeda safehouses and facilities."
- Muktar Yahya Najee Al Warafi was listed as one of the captives who was a foreign fighter.
- Muktar Yahya Najee Al Warafi was listed as one of "36 [captives who] openly admit either membership or significant association with Al Qaeda, the Taliban, or some other group the government considers militarily hostile to the United States."
- Muktar Yahya Najee Al Warafi was listed as one of the captives who had admitted "to training at Al Qaeda or Taliban camps".

=== Habeas corpus ===
In 2015, Warafi's lawyers challenged his detention following a statement by President Barack Obama, that US involvement in hostilities in Afghanistan were over. They argued that the detention of individuals in Guantanamo was only valid while hostilities were ongoing. On July 30, 2015, US District Court Judge Royce Lamberth ruled that, without regard to the Obama's comment, hostilities were still ongoing in Afghanistan, so Warafi's detention remained legal.

A court cannot look to political speeches alone to determine factual and legal realities merely because doing so would be easier than looking at all the relevant evidence. The government may not always mean what it says or say what it means.

One of Warafi's lawyers, Brian Foster, called Lamberth's opinion "rubber stamp for endless detention".

=== Formerly secret Joint Task Force Guantanamo assessment ===
On April 25, 2011, whistleblower organization WikiLeaks published formerly secret assessments drafted by Joint Task Force Guantanamo analysts. His 8-page Joint Task Force Guantanamo assessment was drafted on October 30, 2008. It was signed by camp commandant Rear Admiral David M. Thomas Jr. He recommended continued detention.

== Transfer to Oman ==
Warafi was transferred to Oman with nine other individuals from Yemen: Fahed Abdullah Ahmad Ghazi, Samir Naji al Hasan Moqbel, Waqas Mohammed Ali Awad, Abu Bakr Ibn Ali Muhhammad Alahdal, Abdul al Razzaq Muhammad Salih, Muhhammad Said Bin Salem, Said Muhammed Salih Hatim, Omer Saeed Salem al Daini, Fahmi Abdullah Ahmed. All ten men had been cleared for release in 2009.

== See also ==
- List of Guantanamo Bay detainees
