= Executive Order 13567 =

2011 United States executive order

- Periodic Review of Individuals Detained at Guantánamo Bay Naval Station Pursuant to the Authorization for Use of Military Force
- Type: Executive order
- Number: 13567
- President: Barack Obama
- Signed: March 7, 2011

Summary
- Requires a review to commence within one year of all detainees that were held at Guantanamo Bay detention camp on the date of signature; Provides the Executive Branch with a discretionary periodic review process on the use of detention authority "in individual cases"; Affirms that the right of habeas corpus is held by all detainees at Guantanamo Bay detention camp.

Executive Order 13567 was signed by President Barack Obama on March 7, 2011. Entitled "Periodic Review of Individuals Detained at Guantánamo Bay Naval Station Pursuant to the Authorization for Use of Military Force", its purpose was to establish a process for review of the cases for all detainees at Guantanamo Bay detention camp to establish whether their continued detention is "necessary to protect against a significant threat to the security of the United States", and make recommendations for transfer if not.

Executive Order 13567 followed Executive Order 13492 and Executive Order 13493, executive orders President Obama signed on January 21, 2009, the day after he assumed office. Those executive orders were intended to review which Guantanamo detainees should be released. The Guantanamo Joint Task Force those executive orders set up reviewed the detainees, and recommended that a first group of detainees should be tried, a second group of detainees should be released, and compiled a list of a third group of detainees who should neither be released or charged. Executive Order 13567 established a Periodic Review Secretariat, that would oversee Periodic Review Boards, which would perform periodic reviews of the individuals in the third group, those who were being held indefinitely, without charge.

Senior Civil Service officials from six agencies sit on the Periodic Review Board: the United States Department of Defense, Homeland Security, Justice and State, and the offices of the Chairman of the Joint Chiefs of Staff and the Director of National Intelligence. Each member has a veto over any recommendation. Although Obama authorized the Secretariat to conduct periodic reviews in early 2011, the first review was not conducted until late 2013.

Under the Obama administration, the Board examined 63 detainees, recommending 37 of those to be transferred.

Of the 693 total former detainees transferred out of Guantanamo, 30% are suspected or confirmed to have reengaged in terrorist activity. Of those detainees that were transferred out under President Obama, 5.6% are confirmed and 6.8% are suspected of reengaging in terrorist activity.
