= Moath al-Alwi =

Yemeni prisoner in Guantanamo Bay prison

Moath Hamza Ahmed al-Alwi معاذ حمزة العلوي
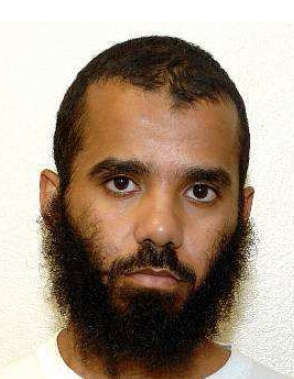
- Moath Hamza al-Alwi's Guantanamo identity portrait, showing him wearing the white uniform issued to "compliant" individuals
- Born: 1977 (age 48–49); Al Hudaydah, Yemen
- Arrested: 2001; Pakistani border Pakistani officials
- Citizenship: Yemen
- Other names: Muaz Hamza Ahmad Al Alawi, Muaz Hamza al-Alawi, Muaz al Alawi
- ISN: 28
- Charge: extrajudicial detention
- Status: Released

Moath Hamza Ahmed al-Alwi (Arabic: معاذ حمزة أحمد العلوي) is a Yemeni prisoner who was held in extrajudicial detention in the United States Guantanamo Bay detainment camps, in Cuba. His detainee ID number was 28. Guantanamo analysts estimated he was born in 1977, in Al Hudaydah, Yemen. Al-Alwi arrived at Guantanamo on January 17, 2002, and was held at Guantanamo for 23 years.

In January 2010, the Guantanamo Review Task Force recommended he should be classed as a "forever prisoner", one who has not committed a crime but is too dangerous to release. In his 2015 Periodic Review Board hearing, intelligence analysts no longer alleged that he was one of Osama bin Laden's bodyguards, now claiming that he "had spent time" with some of those bodyguards.

Al-Alwi's petitions for release have been rejected by the United States District Court for the District of Columbia, the United States Court of Appeals for the District of Columbia Circuit, and the Supreme Court of the United States.

Al-Alwi was a long-term Guantanamo hunger striker, who has described his force-feeding as "an endless horror story." In March 2015, he weighed just 98 pounds.

== Detention ==
In the week after the September 11 attacks, Congress enacted the Authorization for Use of Military Force of 2001, which empowered the President to wage war against those "he determines planned, authorized, committed, or aided the terrorist attacks." In November 2001, President George W. Bush issued the Detention, Treatment, and Trial of Certain Non-Citizens in the War Against Terrorism military order, which authorized the detention of al-Qaeda members and supporters of the Taliban. Al-Alwi was captured in Pakistan during Operation Enduring Freedom and transferred to the Guantanamo Bay detention camp in January 2002.

=== Office for the Administrative Review of Detained Enemy Combatants ===
Combatant Status Review Tribunals were held in a 3x5 meter trailer where the captive sat with his hands and feet shackled to a bolt in the floor.

In Rasul v. Bush (2004), the Supreme Court of the United States found that Guantanamo detainees were entitled to being informed of the allegations justifying their detention, and were entitled to try to refute them. Following the Supreme Court's ruling, the Department of Defense set up the Office for the Administrative Review of Detained Enemy Combatants.

Scholars at the Brookings Institution, led by Benjamin Wittes, listed the captives still held in Guantanamo in December 2008, according to whether their detention was justified by certain common allegations, with al-Alwi listed as one of those:

- who "The military alleges ... are associated with both Al Qaeda and the Taliban."
- who "The military alleges ... traveled to Afghanistan for jihad."
- who "The military alleges that the following detainees stayed in Al Qaeda, Taliban or other guest- or safehouses."
- who "The military alleges ... took military or terrorist training in Afghanistan."
- who "The military alleges ... fought for the Taliban."
- who "The military alleges ... were at Tora Bora."
- whose "names or aliases were found on material seized in raids on Al Qaeda safehouses and facilities."
- who "The military alleges that the following detainees were captured under circumstances that strongly suggest belligerency."
- who "The military alleges ... served on Osama Bin Laden's security detail."
- was an "al Qaeda operative".
- who was one of the "82 detainees made no statement to CSRT or ARB tribunals or made statements that do not bear materially on the military's allegations against them."

=== Habeas corpus petitions ===
Al-Alwi first petitioned the United States District Court for the District of Columbia for a writ of habeas corpus in 2005, arguing he was not an enemy combatant. The court did not consider the petition until after the Supreme Court of the United States in Boumediene v. Bush (2008) determined that Guantanamo prisoners had a constitutional right to bring such petitions. On December 30, 2008, District Court Judge Richard J. Leon denied Al Alawi's petition.

In a separate ruling, the court also found that Hisham Sliti, "were part of or supported the Taliban", and thus could continue to be held in US custody. The New York Times called the two rulings: "the first clear-cut victories for the Bush administration", while Andy Worthington noted they represented a "disturbing development". Glaberson reported that Leon stated he did not have to take a position on the Bush administration's claim Al Alawi was an Osama bin Laden bodyguard, that there was enough evidence he had supported the Taliban to confirm his designation as an "enemy combatant".

In July 2011, a unanimous panel of the United States Court of Appeals for the District of Columbia Circuit affirmed, in an opinion by Circuit Judge Merrick Garland which concluded al-Alwi was in fact an enemy combatant lawfully detained under the 2001 AMUF.

In December 2014, President Barack Obama announced the withdrawal of U.S. troops from Afghanistan. Al-Alwi then filed a new petition for habeas corpus, arguing that the government's authority to detain him “unraveled” when President Obama declared an end to hostilities. In February 2017, District Judge Leon again denied al-Alwi's petition, finding that hostilities were nevertheless ongoing.

In August 2018, a unanimous panel of the D.C. Circuit again affirmed, in an opinion by Circuit Judge Karen LeCraft Henderson. She reasoned that the 2001 AUMF had not expired, that the National Defense Authorization Act for Fiscal Year 2012 had further authorized detentions, and that the international law of war permitted detention of enemy combatants as long as "active combat" continued.

Al-Alwi then petitioned for a writ of certiorari from the Supreme Court. In June 2019, the Court denied that petition, with Justice Stephen Breyer including a statement arguing that the Court should at some point consider the constitutionality of continued detentions in a later "appropriate case".

=== Formerly secret Joint Task Force Guantanamo assessment ===
On April 25, 2011, whistleblower organization WikiLeaks published formerly secret assessments drafted by Joint Task Force Guantanamo analysts. A thirteen-page Joint Task Force Guantanamo detainee assessment was drafted for him on March 14, 2008. It was signed by camp commandant Rear Admiral Mark H. Buzby, who recommended continued detention.

=== Joint Review Task Force ===
When he assumed office in January 2009 President Barack Obama made a number of promises about the future of Guantanamo. He promised the use of torture would cease at the camp. He promised to institute a new review system. That new review system was composed of officials from six departments, where the OARDEC reviews were conducted entirely by the Department of Defense. When it reported back, a year later, the Joint Review Task Force classified some individuals as too dangerous to be transferred from Guantanamo, even though there was no evidence to justify laying charges against them. On April 9, 2013, that document was made public after a Freedom of Information Act request. Al-Alwi was one of the 71 individuals deemed too innocent to charge, but too dangerous to release. Obama promised that those deemed too innocent to charge, but too dangerous to release would start to receive reviews from a Periodic Review Board. Al-Alwi was approved for transfer on December 27, 2021.

Analysts still continued to assert that he was one of the "dirty thirty", a group of thirty individuals, captured together while fleeing to Pakistan, who analysts maintained were all Osama bin Laden bodyguards.

=== Periodic Review ===
Al-Alwi's Guantanamo Review Task Force had concurred with earlier review boards, and recommended he be classed as too dangerous to release, although there was no evidence to justify charging him with a crime. Carol Rosenberg, of the Miami Herald, wrote that the recommendation from his Periodic Review Board concluded that he was "probably not" one of Osama bin Laden's bodyguards, but that he seemed to have "spent time with" them.

== Medical condition ==
As of 2015, al-Alwi is recognized as one of the camp's long-term hunger strikers. Camp authorities published the weight records from the first four years. Those records show al-Alwi's weight being recorded 53 times. His weight was only recorded twice during the camp's first well-known hunger strikes, in 2005, where his weight dropped to 117 and 118 pounds. But a hunger-strike he began in 2013 has left him weighing less than 100 pounds.

Al-Alwi described his hunger strike as a form of peaceful protest.

In 2013, a new warden was appointed to the camp, Colonel John Bogdan. Under his administration, guards fired upon the captives for the first time. Al-Alwi was one of the captives guards shot. He described being shot with rubber coated steel bullets in April 2013. Robert Durand, a camp spokesman, asserted guards were provoked, and that they only fired "four less than lethal rounds". Al-Alwi described being fired upon without warning when he and other men were preparing for communal prayers. According to al-Alwi's account, he was hit by more than four munitions. According to al-Alwi, his wounds were either inadequately treated, or not treated at all.

== Artworks ==
In the late 2010s, al-Alwi began making artworks from materials available to him in the prison. The sculptures that result, mainly in the form of model ships and boats, were made from scrap plastic, fabric and wood. In 2017 several of his sculptures were displayed as part of an exhibition at the City University of New York Law School School of Law.

== Release ==
Al-Alwi and 10 other detainees were transferred to Oman on January 6, 2025.
