= Muhammed Murdi Issa Al Zahrani =

Saudi Arabian Guantanamo Bay detainee

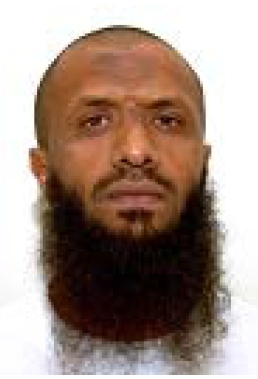
- Zahrani's official identity portrait
- Born: 1969 (age 56–57); Taif, Saudi Arabia
- Released: 2014-11-22; Saudi Arabia
- Citizenship: Saudi Arabia
- Detained at: Guantanamo
- ISN: 713
- Charge(s): no charge, extrajudicial detention
- Status: transferred on 2014-11-22

Muhammed Murdi Issa Al Zahrani is a citizen of Saudi Arabia who was held in the United States's Guantanamo Bay detention camps, in Cuba from August 5, 2002, until November 22, 2014. His Guantanamo Internment Serial Number was 713. Joint Task Force Guantanamo counter-terrorism analysts estimate he was born in 1969, in Taif, Saudi Arabia.

Al-Zahrani was the thirteenth captive to be released or transferred in 2014, and the seventh to be released or transferred in November 2014. His transfer stirred controversy because he had been characterized as a "forever prisoner", one too innocent to be charged with a war crime, who was also considered too dangerous to release.

== Official status reviews ==
Originally the Bush Presidency asserted that captives apprehended in the "war on terror" were not covered by the Geneva Conventions, and could be held indefinitely, without charge, and without an open and transparent review of the justifications for their detention. In 2004 the United States Supreme Court ruled, in Rasul v. Bush, that Guantanamo captives were entitled to being informed of the allegations justifying their detention, and were entitled to try to refute them.

=== Office for the Administrative Review of Detained Enemy Combatants ===
Following the Supreme Court's ruling the Department of Defense set up the Office for the Administrative Review of Detained Enemy Combatants.

Scholars at the Brookings Institution, led by Benjamin Wittes, listed the captives still held in Guantanamo in December 2008, according to whether their detention was justified by certain common allegations:

- Muhammed Murdi Issa Al Zahrani was listed as one of the captives who the military alleges were members of either al Qaeda or the Taliban and associated with the other group.
- Muhammed Murdi Issa Al Zahrani was listed as one of the captives who "The military alleges ... traveled to Afghanistan for jihad."
- Muhammed Murdi Issa Al Zahrani was listed as one of the captives who "The military alleges that the following detainees stayed in Al Qaeda, Taliban or other guest- or safehouses."
- Muhammed Murdi Issa Al Zahrani was listed as one of the captives who "The military alleges ... took military or terrorist training in Afghanistan."
- Muhammed Murdi Issa Al Zahrani was listed as one of the captives who "The military alleges ... fought for the Taliban."
- Muhammed Murdi Issa Al Zahrani was listed as one of the captives who was a member of the "al Qaeda leadership cadre".
- Muhammed Murdi Issa Al Zahrani was listed as one of the "82 detainees made no statement to CSRT or ARB tribunals or made statements that do not bear materially on the military's allegations against them."

=== Salam Abdullah Said v. George W. Bush ===
Mohammed Zahrani was one of five Saudi who had a petition of habeas corpus filed on their behalf December 13, 2005, in Salam Abdullah Said v. George W. Bush. In September 2007, the Department of Justice published dossiers of unclassified documents arising from the Combatant Status Review Tribunals of 179 captives. Mohammed Zahrani's documents were not among those the Department of Defense published.

On June 10, 2006, the Department of Defense reported that three captives died in custody. The Department of Defense stated the three men committed suicide. Camp authorities called the deaths "an act of asymmetric warfare", and suspected plans had been coordinated by the captive's attorneys—so they seized all the captives' documents, including the captives' copies of their habeas documents. Since the habeas documents were privileged lawyer-client communication the Department of Justice was compelled to file documents about the document seizures.

The Military Commissions Act of 2006 mandated that Guantanamo captives were no longer entitled to access the US civil justice system, so all outstanding habeas corpus petitions were stayed.

On June 12, 2008, the United States Supreme Court ruled, in Boumediene v. Bush, that the Military Commissions Act could not remove the right for Guantanamo captives to access the US Federal Court system. And all previous Guantanamo captives' habeas petitions were eligible to be re-instated.

On July 18, 2008, David W. DeBruin filed a renewal for the habeas corpus of two of the five captives in Said v. Bush. The petition stated that three of the captives had been repatriated. Mohammed Zahrani and Saad Al Qahtani were listed as captives who were still in detention in Guantanamo, who were requesting having their habeas petition re-instated.

Saudi Arabian captives had represented the largest group of foreigners apprehended in Afghanistan and transported to Guantanamo. However, by the end of 2007, almost all the Saudis had been sent home.

=== Formerly secret Joint Task Force Guantanamo assessment ===
On April 25, 2011, whistleblower organization WikiLeaks published formerly secret assessments drafted by Joint Task Force Guantanamo analysts. His assessment was ten pages long, and was drafted on July 4, 2008. His assessment was signed by Rear Admiral David M. Thomas, the camp commandant. It asserted his was a high risk to the USA, and recommended his continued detention.

=== Guantanamo Review Task Force ===
On January 22, 2009, shortly after he took office, President Barack Obama issued three executive orders directed at the detention of captives at Guantanamo. He created a new review procedure, the Guantanamo Joint Review Task Force. Where the officials reviewing captives' status for OARDEC were all military officers, the officials on the new task force were drawn from several government departments. The task force determined Zahrani was too dangerous to release, but too innocent to face charges—the press characterized him as a "forever prisoner".

=== Period Review Board ===
President Obama's executive orders promised that the status would be reviewed periodically, to determine if they were still too dangerous to release. However, the first periodic review wasn't convened until late 2013. Al Zahrani had a periodic review scheduled for 2014. His Board took months to publish its recommendation. On October 20, 2014, the Board's recommendation that Al Zahrani be transferred to Saudi Arabia was made public.

Carol Rosenberg, writing in the Miami Herald, noted that his board characterized him as less dangerous than the "Taliban five"—five former Taliban leaders released from Guantanamo in a trade for Sergeant Bowe Bergdahl.

Lawfare noted that the justifications for Al Zahrani's release included that the allegations used to justify his detention had never been corroborated. Other justifications included that Al Zahrani had been a well-behaved captive, and had a plan for his peaceful reintegration into the mainstream of Saudi society.

The Associated Press noted that another factor in the recommendation to transfer Al Zahrani to Saudi Arabia was his willingness to enter in the Saudi rehabilitation program.
