= Ghaleb Nassar Al Bihani =

Yemeni former Guantanamo Bay detainee (born 1979)

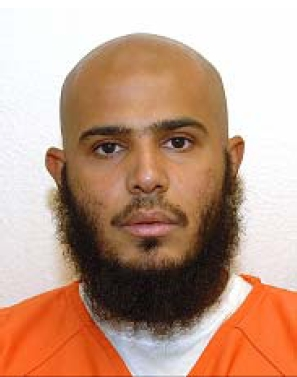
- Al Bihani's Guantanamo identity portrait -- the orange uniform indicates JTF-GTMO considered him noncompliant.
- Born: 1979 (age 46–47); Tabuk, Saudi Arabia
- Detained at: Guantanamo
- Other name: al Bahani
- ISN: 128
- Charge(s): no charge, extrajudicial detention

Ghaleb Nassar Al Bihani (Arabic: غالب نصار البيهاني) is a citizen of Yemen formerly held in the United States Guantanamo Bay detainment camps, in Cuba. The Department of Defense estimated that he was born in 1979, in Tabuk, Saudi Arabia.

Multiple media outlets reported that al-Bihani had simply been a cook for the Taliban's 55th Arab Brigade.

Al-Bihani's habeas corpus petition was the first one to be ruled on by a higher court.

On May 28, 2014, a Periodic Review Board recommended that al-Bihani should be cleared for release.

Ghaleb Nassar Al Bihani arrived at Guantanamo on January 17, 2002, and was transferred to Oman with nine other men, on January 16, 2017.

== Official status reviews ==
Originally the Bush Presidency asserted that captives apprehended in the "war on terror" were not covered by the Geneva Conventions, and could be held indefinitely, without charge, and without an open and transparent review of the justifications for their detention. In 2004 the United States Supreme Court ruled, in Rasul v. Bush, that Guantanamo captives were entitled to being informed of the allegations justifying their detention, and were entitled to try to refute them.

=== Office for the Administrative Review of Detained Enemy Combatants ===
Following the Supreme Court's ruling, the Department of Defense set up the Office for the Administrative Review of Detained Enemy Combatants.

Scholars at the Brookings Institution, led by Benjamin Wittes, listed the captives still held in Guantanamo in December 2008, according to whether their detention was justified by certain common allegations:

- Al Bihani was listed as one of the captives who "The military alleges ... are members of the Taliban."
- Ghaleb Nassar Al Bihani was listed as one of the captives who "The military alleges ... traveled to Afghanistan for jihad."
- Al Bihani was listed as one of the captives for whom "The military alleges that the following detainees stayed in Al Qaeda, Taliban or other guest- or safehouses."
- Al Bihani was listed as one of the captives who "The military alleges ... took military or terrorist training in Afghanistan."
- Al Bihani was listed as one of the captives who "The military alleges ... fought for the Taliban."
- Ghaleb Nassar Al Bihani was listed as one of the captives who "The military alleges that the following detainees were captured under circumstances that strongly suggest belligerency."
- Al Bihani was listed as one of the captives who were foreign fighters.
- Al Bihani was listed as one of "36 [captives who] openly admit either membership or significant association with Al Qaeda, the Taliban, or some other group the government considers militarily hostile to the United States."
- Al Bihani was listed as one of the captives who had admitted to "fighting on behalf of Al Qaeda or the Taliban."

=== Writ of habeas corpus ===
Al Bihani had a writ of habeas corpus filed on his behalf before US District Court Judge Richard J. Leon.[6][7][8][9][20][21][22][excessive citations]

On January 29, 2009, Leon ruled that his CSR Tribunal had appropriated classified al-Bihani, as an enemy combatant—even though he had only served as a cook, quoting Napoleon Bonaparte: "An Army marches on its stomach."

Ghal's lawyer, Shereen Charlick, appealed Leon's ruling to a panel of the DC Circuit Court of Appeals. According to Charlick, those in the 55th Arab Brigade "never had a chance to declare themselves neutral," and Ghaleb, "was fleeing. He was trying to run away. One could argue that he assisted the United States' effort by surrendering."

A panel of three judges, Janice Rogers Brown, Brett Kavanaugh and Stephen F. Williams convened on October 2, 2009, to hear Ghaleb's appeal. Although the judges expressed some skeptical comments they did not release a ruling.

The October 2, 2009, hearing was open to the public. According to the Blog of Legal Times Charlick had wanted to attend the September 15, 2009, hearing of the appeal of Leon's ruling on Bensayah Belkacem, because his case was similar to Ghaleb's. But the judges ruling on Bensayah's appeal had cleared the court, in order to hear classified evidence. Charlick was excluded, in spite of the security clearance she was granted in order to see classified evidence against Ghaleb.

The appeal panel made its ruling on January 5, 2010. John Schwartz, writing in the New York Times, calling the ruling "sweeping", wrote the judges found: "...that the presidential war power to detain those suspected of terrorism is not limited even by international law of war." According to Schwartz, an expert in the Guantanamo cases, Eric M. Freedman of Hofstra University characterized the panel's ruling as having: "gone out of its way to poke a stick in the eye of the Supreme Court". CNN reported that the ruling would apply to all other captives.

=== Guantanamo Review Task Force ===
On January 22, 2009, when President Barack Obama had just taken office, he issued three Executive Orders related to Guantanamo—one of which set up a high-level Guantanamo Review Task Force. Practically no documents generated by this Task Force's activities have been made public, other than the three lists of captives. The Task Force broke the remaining captives into three groups: those who should face charges; those who did not represent enough of a threat to the US to justify continued detention, and who should be released; and finally individuals for who there was no evidence to justify laying criminal charges who nevertheless should continue to be detained due to the threat to the USA they were imagined to represent should they be released. Ghaled Nassar al-Bihani was one of men who weren't guilty of a crime, so they couldn't be charged, who, nevertheless, due to fears of what he might do, if released, the Task Force recommended continued detention.

Al-Bihani, and the other men who faced indefinite detention without charge, were supposed to have regular status reviews, to see whether they were still feared to represent a sufficient danger they should continue to be held in continued extrajudicial detention.

=== Periodic Review Board ===
al-Bihani was the fourth individual to have a Periodic Review Board hearing scheduled to review his status.[28][29]

His review was held on April 8, 2014. Senior representatives of the Departments of Defense, State, Justice, Homeland Security and the Office of the Director of National Intelligence convened in Washington DC area. Al-Bihani, his civilian lawyer Pardiss Kebraie, his Personal Representatives, would be allowed to participate in the non-classified part of the review, via videolink. A limited number of reporters and human rights workers would be allowed to view part of the non-classified portion of the review, via a one-way video-link.

Two documents prepared for his review were made public on April 8, 2014.

A single page "Guantanamo Detainee Profile", prepared on January 27, was three paragraphs long—and was much less specific than the summary of evidence memos prepared for his annual OARDEC reviews. It asserted that al-Bihani was "almost certainly" a member of al Qaeda, that he had brothers who had also traveled to Afghanistan, for jihad, that one brother was a member of Al Qaeda in the Arabian Peninsula.

Also published was a four pages from his Personal Representatives and his civilian lawyer Pardiss Kebraie. His Personal Representative wrote:

Looking at the factors listed in the DTM 12-005 for assessing whether a detainee meets this standard, they can be grouped into three general categories: factors that go to whether a detainee has the capacity to be a significant and continuing threat to the security of the United States, whether he has the motive, and whether he will have the opportunity. In the vulnerability assessment methodologies with which I am familiar, if any of the three is absent or sufficiently low, then a threat is considered to be negligible.

His Personal Representative argued that al-Bihani didn't meet any of the criteria for being an ongoing threat, while the guidelines required him to meet all three criteria.

== Reports his brother was killed fighting in Somalia ==
The Long War Journal reported that a martyrdom statement for Abu 'Asim al Tabuki Mansour Nasser al Bihani was published in November 2011. It reported that this individual had fought in Chechnya, lived in Afghanistan, until the fall of the Taliban, had been captured in Saudi Arabia, transferred to Yemen, where he escaped from Prison, and finally travelled to Somalia, where he died fighting for jihadists. It reported he had two brothers in Guantanamo.

== See also ==
- Tolfiq Nassar Ahmed Al Bihani his brother
