= Ahmed Abdul Qader =

Yemen criminal, currently imprisoned in Estonia

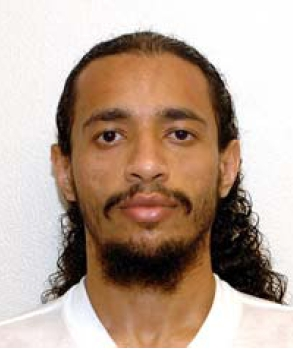
- Guantanamo captive Akhmed Abdul Qadir wearing the white uniform issued to compliant captives.
- Born: 1984 (age 41–42); Sanaa
- Arrested: 2001; Sanaa; Pakistan authorities
- Released: 2015-01-14; Estonia
- Citizenship: Yemen
- Detained at: Guantanamo
- Other names: Akhmed Abdul Qadir; Ahmad Abdel Qader Ahmad Hasan Abu Bakr; al-Hadrami; al-Mukallawi; al-Muthana; Moussab al-Yemeni; Asifa Abdel Rahman
- ISN: 690
- Charge: extrajudicial detention

Ahmed Abdul Qader is a citizen of Yemen, who was held in extrajudicial detention in the United States Guantanamo Bay detainment camps, in Cuba from June 18, 2002, to January 14, 2015. His detainee ID number was 690. The Department of Defense estimated that Qader was born in 1984, in Sana'a, Yemen.

Ahmed Abdul was cleared for release by the Guantanamo Review Task Force. He was accepted as a refugee by Estonia on January 14, 2015.

== Official status reviews ==
Originally the Bush Presidency asserted that captives apprehended in the "war on terror" were not covered by the Geneva Conventions, and could be held indefinitely, without charge, and without an open and transparent review of the justifications for their detention. In 2004, the United States Supreme Court ruled, in Rasul v. Bush, that Guantanamo captives were entitled to being informed of the allegations justifying their detention, and were entitled to try to refute them.

=== Office for the Administrative Review of Detained Enemy Combatants ===
Combatant Status Review Tribunals were held in a trailer the size of a large RV. The captive sat on a plastic garden chair, with his hands and feet shackled to a bolt in the floor. Three chairs were reserved for members of the press, but only 37 of the 574 Tribunals were observed.

Following the Supreme Court's ruling the Department of Defense set up the Office for the Administrative Review of Detained Enemy Combatants.

Following Freedom of Information Act requests the DoD published documents from Ahmed Abdul's annual OARDEC hearings from 2004, 2005, 2006 and 2007.

Scholars at the Brookings Institution, led by Benjamin Wittes, studied these documents, and listed the captives still held in Guantanamo in December 2008, according to whether their detention was justified by certain common allegations According to their study:

- Ahmed Abdul Qader was listed as one of the captives who "The military alleges ... are associated with both Al Qaeda and the Taliban."
- Ahmed Abdul Qader was listed as one of the captives who "The military alleges that the following detainees stayed in Al Qaeda, Taliban or other guest- or safehouses."
- Ahmed Abdul Qader was listed as one of the captives who "The military alleges ... took military or terrorist training in Afghanistan."
- Ahmed Abdul Qader was listed as one of the captives who "The military alleges ... fought for the Taliban."
- Ahmed Abdul Qader was listed as one of the captives who "The military alleges that the following detainees were captured under circumstances that strongly suggest belligerency."
- Ahmed Abdul Qader was listed as one of the captives who "The military alleges ... served on Osama Bin Laden’s security detail."
- Ahmed Abdul Qader was listed as one of the captives who was an "al Qaeda operative".
- Ahmed Abdul Qader was listed as one of the captives who "deny affiliation with Al Qaeda or the Taliban yet admit facts that, under the broad authority the laws of war give armed parties to detain the enemy, offer the government ample legal justification for its detention decisions."
- Ahmed Abdul Qader was listed as one of the captives who "The military alleges ... admitted fighting on behalf of Al Qaeda or the Taliban."

Ahmed Abdul chose to participate in his initial 2004 Combatant Status Review Tribunal. The United States Department of Defense published an 8-page summary of the transcript of his hearing.

Ahmed Abdul requested fellow captive Abdul Aziz, the Al Wafa director, as a witness. Abdul Aziz stated he did not remember ever meeting Qadar, and since he did not remember him Ahmed Abdul could never have worked for him.

=== Habeas corpus petition ===
Ahmed Abdul's habeas corpus petition was turned down in 2011.

=== Formerly secret Joint Task Force Guantanamo assessment ===
Qader's JTF-GTMO detainee assessment.

On April 25, 2011, whistleblower organization WikiLeaks published formerly secret assessments drafted by Joint Task Force Guantanamo analysts. A 13-page Joint Task Force Guantanamo detainee assessment was drafted about him on May 20, 2008. It was signed by camp commandant Rear Admiral David M Thomas Jr. who recommended continued detention.

=== Guantanamo Review Task Force ===
On January 21, 2009, the day he was inaugurated, United States President Barack Obama issued three Executive orders related to the detention of individuals in Guantanamo. He established a task force to re-review the status of all the remaining captives. Where the OARDEC officials reviewing the status of the captives were all "field grade" officers in the US military (Commanders, naval Captains, Lieutenant Colonels and Colonels) the officials seconded to the task force were drawn from not only the Department of Defense, but also from five other agencies, including the Departments of State, Justice, Homeland Security. President Obama gave the task force a year, and it recommended the release of Qader and 54 other individuals.

== Transfer to Estonia ==
He was accepted as a refugee by Estonia on January 14, 2015. The government decided to offer an invitation to Qader on October 9, 2014. The invitation told him he would be allowed to apply for asylum status.

Estonia had been in discussions to accept individuals formerly held in Guantanamo, for years. The Baltic Times reported, on August 29, 2009, that Estonia was prepared to accept multiple individuals. However, on October 12, 2010, Russia Today reported that Foreign Minister Urmas Paet, informed the Estonian legislature that Estonian law barred accepting the former captives.

In 2011, the whistleblower site WikiLeaks published formerly secret diplomatic cables that stated the USA had offered to pay Estonia 62600 euros for every captive Estonia took.

== Third party comments ==
On December 24, 2014, Linda Greenhouse, a long-time commentator on the United States Supreme Court, writing in The New York Times, wrote about Ahmed Abdul habeas corpus petition, and comments made by more senior judges on his case.

Sara Davidson, writing in the New Yorker magazine and Wells Bennett, writing for Lawfare, both commented on his case, following his transfer to Estonia.

== Alleged disappearance ==
On June 28, 2015, Mark Mackinnon, reporting from Tallinn, for The Globe and Mail, reported that Akhmed Abdul Qader had "disappeared".

On July 7, 2015, an article in Postimees stated, that: "Up to now, the man has not been outside the country."

== New York Times interview ==
On July 29, 2016, Charlie Savage of The New York Times, profiled Qader after an extensive interview. According to Savage, Qader reported 'terrible anxiety problems'. He reported that Qader was too anxious to travel, and sometimes could not leave his apartment. He described feeling anxious to go anywhere, for fear that, coincidentally, there is an explosion nearby, and his proximity makes him the prime suspect.

The Estonian government provides Qader with a studio apartment, a stipend, language lessons, health care, and a coach to help him adjust to life in Estonia.

Qader's family arranged a marriage for him, conducted via Skype, but his wife had not been able to join him yet.

Savage said that Qader had a pleasant surprise when his boss realized that his new apprentice was the recent refugee who had been held in Guantanamo. He had kept his history private, even from his boss, when he was hired in the fall of 2015. However, his boss was friendly, and curious about his history, and invited him to a family dinner to share it. However, one drunken neighbor had harassed him, had left garbage at his door, and Qader had to phone the police. After that, harassment by the neighbor stopped.
