= Sawah =

Sawah may refer to:

- "Sawah" (song), a 1972 song by Abdel Halim Hafez
- Sawah Besar, a district in Jakarta, Indonesia
- Sawah Besar railway station, a railway station in Indonesia
- Sawah Ring, a village in Johor, Malaysia
- Tariq al-Sawah (1957–2026), Egyptian Guantanamo Bay detainee

== See also ==
- Sawahlunto, a city in Sumatra, Indonesia
