= Tariq al-Sawah =

Egyptian detainee (1957–2026)

Tariq al-Sawah طارق السواح
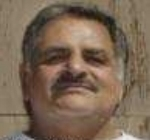
- Al-Sawah's Guantanamo portrait ID
- Born: 2 November 1957; Alexandria, Egypt
- Died: 31 March 2026 (aged 68); Zenica, Bosnia and Herzegovina
- Citizenship: Egypt
- Detained at: Guantanamo (2002–2016)
- Other names: Abu Layth al-Masri; Abu Tariq al-Masri; Abu Hassan; Albany Taher; Tariq al-Bisnawi
- ISN: 535
- Charge: Charges dismissed on 1 March 2012
- Status: Released in January 2016

Tariq Mahmud Ahmad Muhammad al-Sawah (Arabic: طارق محمود أحمد محمد السواح; 2 November 1957 – 31 March 2026), also spelled Tarek El Sawah, was a citizen of Egypt who was held in the United States Guantanamo Bay detention camps, in Cuba, from May 2002 to January 2016.

Al-Sawah was charged with war crimes, but those charges were dismissed on 1 March 2012. According to the Egypt Independent, formerly secret documents, drafted by Joint Task Force Guantanamo, and published by the whistleblower organization WikiLeaks in 2011, contradicted the charges al-Sawah had faced.

== Background ==
Tariq al-Sawah was born in Alexandria on 2 November 1957. According to CIA sources, Al-Sawah joined the Egyptian Muslim Brotherhood in 1975 while still attending secondary school. In 1981, shortly after graduating from Alexandria University with a degree in geology, he was imprisoned at Tora Prison, as part of a crackdown following the presidential assassination of Anwar Sadat. He was released in 1982 and by 1984, Al-Sawah was a certified teacher in Islamic studies through Al-Azhar University and employed as a construction supervisor. Between 1985 and 1986, he worked as a textile merchant before becoming an accountant until 1990, at which point he moved to Athens, Greece as a general contractor.

According to Al-Sawah, he travelled to Croatia in the early 1990s during the breakup of Yugoslavia, working in Zagreb for the International Islamic Relief Organisation. He subsequently went to Bosnia to deliver humanitarian aid as a truck driver before enlisting in the Bosnian Army, serving between September 1993 to December 1995 in the 3rd Corps. After the Dayton Agreement, Al-Sawah stayed in the country, receiving Bosnian citizenship on 15 March 1993 and settling as a chicken farmer in Bočinja, near Maglaj. He married a Bosniak woman, with whom he had a daughter. In June 1999, Al-Sawah was hired as an accountant to handle supply credit and food deliveries for the village.

The Dayton Agreement had stipulated that foreign fighters such as Al-Sawah had to leave Bosnia, arguing that many held radical Islamist beliefs and thus posed a security threat. After hearing rumours of incoming deportations, Al-Sawah left for Kabul, Afghanistan in 2000, believing the Egyptian government might hand him over if he returned. The CIA recorded that Al-Sawah was detained by the Taliban upon arrival, had his passport confiscated, and interrogated for forty days at the Ministry of the Interior. Following the September 11 attacks in the United States, increasing pressure from the U.S. government initiated the war on terror and the same year, Al-Sawah was seriously injured by a cluster bomb while attempting to cross the Tora Bora mountains for the border to Pakistan. He was captured by the Northern Alliance and held in Afghan government custody until 2002, when he was turned over to U.S. authorities.

Tariq Mahmud Ahmad Muhammad al-Sawah arrived at the Guantanamo detention camps on 5 May 2002, and was held there for 5,008 days, until 20 January 2016. Al-Sawah was one of the few captives who acknowledged having fought in conflicts, in his case the Bosnian war. His Bosnian citizenship was revoked during detainment, with an official of the Bosnian Ministry of Justice, Amir Pilav, stating that there was "no evidence" of al-Sawah being a Bosnian national during a visit to Guantanamo, despite his record being available in the security centre service of Zenica.

The Long War Journal reported that al-Sawah, was a very skilled bomb-maker, who had been trained by Muhsin Musa Matwalli Atwah, the bomb-maker who developed the bomb used against the USS Cole (DDG-67). They reported he had invented an early model of shoe-bomb in the summer of 2001 and that he developed new models of magnetic limpet-mines. However, the FBI found that claims of al Sawah's explosive expertise were the result of novice military interrogators jumping to improper conclusions. Tom Dale, writing for the Egyptian Independent found that there was a "disregard for both fact and coherence on the part of U.S. interrogators." Similarly, interrogation protocols noted that Al-Sawah provided conflicting timelines in which alleged training at the Al-Qaeda al-Faruq training camp in Kandahar Province would have overlapped with active fighting in Jalalabad.

It was reported that "much of the information given by Guantanamo detainees was confessed under Pentagon-mandated torture," and in the case of al-Sawah, "several former Guantanamo commanders had indicated that El-Sawah was not a threat and recommended his release."

The Washington Post reported that al-Sawah and Mohamedou Ould Slahi were held in a separate compound, where they were extended extra privileges, as they had both chosen to cooperate with intelligence officials.

In August 2012, al-Sawah was the last Egyptian captive in Guantanamo.

== Official status reviews ==
Originally the Bush Presidency asserted that captives apprehended in the "war on terror" were not covered by the Geneva Conventions, and could be held indefinitely, without charge, and without an open and transparent review of the justifications for their detention. In 2004 the United States Supreme Court ruled, in Rasul v. Bush, that Guantanamo captives were entitled to being informed of the allegations justifying their detention, and were entitled to try to refute them.

=== Office for the Administrative Review of Detained Enemy Combatants ===
Following the Supreme Court's ruling the Department of Defense set up the Office for the Administrative Review of Detained Enemy Combatants.

Scholars at the Brookings Institution, led by Benjamin Wittes, listed the captives still held in Guantanamo in December 2008, according to whether their detention was justified by certain common allegations:

- Tariq Mahmud Ahmad Muhammad al-Sawah was listed as one of the captives who "The military alleges ... are members of Al Qaeda."
- Tariq Mahmud Ahmad Muhammad al-Sawah was listed as one of the captives who "The military alleges ... traveled to Afghanistan for jihad."
- Tariq Mahmud Ahmad Muhammad al-Sawah was listed as one of the captives who "The military alleges ... took military or terrorist training in Afghanistan."
- Tariq Mahmud Ahmad Muhammad al-Sawah was listed as one of the captives who was a foreign fighter.
- Tariq Mahmud Ahmad Muhammad al-Sawah was listed as one of "36 [captives who] openly admit either membership or significant association with Al Qaeda, the Taliban, or some other group the government considers militarily hostile to the United States."
- Tariq Mahmud Ahmad Muhammad al-Sawah was listed as one of the captives who had admitted "fighting on behalf of Al Qaeda or the Taliban."

However, al Sawah long denied that he was ever a member of Al Qaeda, that he traveled to Afghanistan for jihad, that he took part in terrorist training, that he was hostile towards the United States, or that he fought on behalf of Al-Qaeda.

=== Habeas corpus petition ===
Al-Sawah had a writ of habeas corpus filed on his behalf in June 2005.

=== Formerly secret Joint Task Force Guantanamo assessment ===
On 25 April 2011, whistleblower organization WikiLeaks published formerly secret assessments drafted by Joint Task Force Guantanamo analysts. Joint Task Force Guantanamo drafted a fourteen-page assessment of al-Sawah, dated 30 September 2008. The memo was signed by camp commandant David M. Thomas Jr. and recommended his "Transfer Out of DOD Control."

=== Joint Review Task Force ===
When he assumed office in January 2009 President Barack Obama made a number of promises about the future of Guantanamo. He promised the use of torture would cease at the camp. He promised to institute a new review system. That new review system was composed of officials from six departments, where the OARDEC reviews were conducted entirely by the U.S. Department of Defense. When it reported back, a year later, the Joint Review Task Force classified some individuals as too dangerous to be transferred from Guantanamo, even though there was no evidence to justify laying charges against them. On 9 April 2013, that document was made public after a Freedom of Information Act request. Tariq Mahmud Ahmad Muhammad al-Sawah was one of the 71 individuals deemed too innocent to charge, but too dangerous to release. Although Obama promised that those deemed too innocent to charge, but too dangerous to release would start to receive reviews from a Periodic Review Board less than a quarter of men have received a review. Al-Sawah was approved for transfer on 12 February 2015.

== Faces charges before a Guantanamo military commission ==
On 16 December 2008 Carol Rosenberg, writing in the Miami Herald, reported that the Guantanamo military commission prosecutors announced charges had been laid against Tariq al-Sawah. These charges were later dismissed on 1 March 2012. Al-Sawah was represented by Major Sean Gleason, an active-duty Judge Advocate.

== Health issues ==
Rosenberg noted that the documents the DoD had published showed wild fluctuations in Al-Sawah's body weight gaining over 200 pounds (91 kg) during his first four years of detention. By November 2011, his weight had "nearly doubled" to 420 pounds (190 kg). During his detention, Al-Sawah developed an eating disorder, resulting in morbid obesity. By the time of his release, he had diabetes, coronary artery disease, high cholesterol, non-alcoholic fatty liver, and sciatica.

In March 2013 the Egypt Independent reported that Tariq's lawyers had arranged for Dr. Sondra Crosby, an associate professor of medicine at the Boston University School of Medicine and Public Health, to examine him on two occasions. A letter from Crosby to camp authorities describes his health as at serious risk, due to his weight-related conditions. Nevertheless, camp authorities declined to offer him any special treatment, or even to release his medical records.

== Release and resettlement ==
Al-Sawah was released in January 2016 after Bosnia and Herzegovina had expressed willingness to accept him. His brother Jamal, who was a resident of the United States and been put under observation by the FBI since Al-Sawah's detention, was not allowed to take him in as former Guantanamo detainees were required to leave US territory. His daughter, who had been allowed to talk with her father via video calls a few years earlier for the first time since his detention, also stated that she heard of his repatriation through media reports and was not given further information. In a 2017 interview, Al-Sawah stated that he was dropped off at Sarajevo Airport with only a t-shirt and that he never received an apology. He remained in Sarajevo under subsidiary protection, but he did not regain Bosnian citizenship, and with a lack of other identity documents, he could not obtain a job. The agreement with U.S. authorities allowed Al-Sawah to receive housing and monthly government aid equivalent to $125, but still required the aid of charities and mosques to ensure his livelihood.

== Death ==
Al-Sawah died in Zenica on 31 March 2026, aged 68, reportedly whilst in a coma. No cause of death was given, although his brother stated that Al-Sawah had been hospitalized since January 2026.
