= Omar Said Salim Al Dayi =

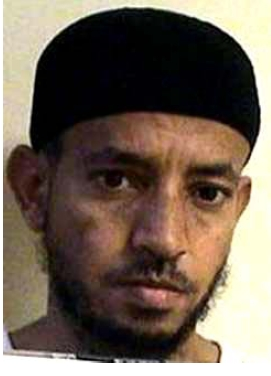
- Official Guantanamo identity portrait of Omar Said Salem Adayn, showing him wearing the white uniform issued to "compliant" individuals.
- Born: 1976 (age 49–50); Hadramaut, Yemen
- Detained at: Guantanamo
- ISN: 549
- Charge(s): No charge, held in extrajudicial detention
- Status: Released in Oman in January 2016

Omar Said Salim Al Dayi, also known as Omar Said Salem Adayn and Omer Saeed Salem Al Daini, is held in extrajudicial detention in the United States Guantanamo Bay detention camps, in Cuba. His Guantanamo Internee Security Number is 549.

He arrived in Guantanamo on June 18, 2002. The Guantanamo Review Task Force cleared him for release in January 2010. He was transferred to Oman on January 13, 2016, with nine other Yemenis.

== Inconsistent identification ==
Al Dayi was identified inconsistently on official Department of Defense documents:

- He was identified as Omar Said Salim Al Dayi on the Summary of Evidence memo prepared for his Combatant Status Review Tribunal, on October 13, 2004, and on the Summary of Evidence memo prepared for his Administrative Review Board, on November 7, 2005.
- He was identified as Abdul Rahman on the second official lists of captives' names, published on May 15, 2006.
- He was identified as Omar Said Salem Adayn on the Summary of Evidence memo prepared for his second annual Administrative Review Board, on July 5, 2006.
- He was identified as Omer Saeed Salem Al Daini on a habeas petition, Omer Saeed Salem Al Daini v. George W. Bush -- 05-0634

== Official status reviews ==
Originally, the Bush Presidency asserted that captives apprehended in the "war on terror" were not covered by the Geneva Conventions, and could be held indefinitely, without charge, and without an open and transparent review of the justifications for their detention. In 2004, the United States Supreme Court ruled, in Rasul v. Bush, that Guantanamo captives were entitled to being informed of the allegations justifying their detention, and were entitled to try to refute them.

=== Office for the Administrative Review of Detained Enemy Combatants ===
Combatant Status Review Tribunals were held in a 3x5 meter trailer where the captive sat with his hands and feet shackled to a bolt in the floor.

Following the Supreme Court's ruling the Department of Defense set up the Office for the Administrative Review of Detained Enemy Combatants.

Scholars at the Brookings Institution, led by Benjamin Wittes, listed the captives still held in Guantanamo in December 2008, according to whether their detention was justified by certain common allegations:

- Omar Said Salim Al Dayi was listed as one of the captives who "The military alleges ... are members of Al Qaeda."
- Omar Said Salim Al Dayi was listed as one of the captives who "The military alleges that the following detainees stayed in Al Qaeda, Taliban or other guest- or safehouses."
- Omar Said Salim Al Dayi was listed as one of the captives who "The military alleges ... were at Tora Bora."
- Omar Said Salim Al Dayi was listed as one of the captives whose "names or aliases were found on material seized in raids on Al Qaeda safehouses and facilities."
- Omar Said Salim Al Dayi was listed as one of the captives who was a foreign fighter.
- Omar Said Salim Al Dayi was listed as one of the "82 detainees made no statement to CSRT or ARB tribunals or made statements that do not bear materially on the military’s allegations against them."

There is no record that al Dayi attended any of his OARDEC hearings.

On January 9, 2009, the Department of Defense published eight pages of memos drafted by his third annual Administrative Review Board. The memos were heavily redacted, and the Board's recommendation was withheld. The Board met on August 7, 2007, without the captive being present. The covering letter from the director of the Office for the Administrative Review of Detained Enemy Combatants to Gordon England, the Designated Civilian Official, who, theoretically, made the final decision as to whether captives should be cleared for release, ordered his continued detention on October 12, 2007.

The record of proceedings stated that the captive declined to attend the board's hearing. His Assisting Military Officer, who met with the captive, indicated that the captive was "uncooperative or unresponsive".

The record indicates his habeas counsel had submitted documents in his defense, and that these were considered by his board. However, while other captive's habeas submissions have been published, these, however, were not published.

=== habeas corpus ===
A writ of habeas corpus, Omer Saeed Salem Al Daini v. George W. Bush -- 05-0634, was submitted on his behalf. In September 2007, the Department of Defense published dossiers from documents prepare for 179 captive's Combatant Status Review Tribunal. However, the Department of Defense did not release his dossier. He was represented by C. Rufus Pennington III.

=== Formerly secret Joint Task Force Guantanamo assessment ===
On April 25, 2011, whistleblower organization WikiLeaks published formerly secret assessments drafted by Joint Task Force Guantanamo analysts. A ten-page Joint Task Force Guantanamo assessment was drafted on June 20, 2008. It was signed by camp commandant rear admiral David M. Thomas. He recommended continued detention.
