= Salem Ahmed Hadi =

Yemeni former Guantanamo Bay detainee (born 1976)

Salem Ahmed Hadi bin Kanad
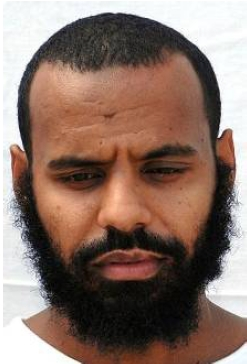
- Born: January 15, 1976 (age 50); Hadhramaut, Yemen
- Detained at: Guantanamo
- ISN: 131
- Charge(s): no charge, held in extrajudicial detention
- Status: transferred to Saudi Arabia on 2017-01-05
- Children: 2 daughters

Salem Ahmed Hadi bin Kanad is a citizen of Yemen, who was held in extrajudicial detention in the United States Guantanamo Bay detainment camps, in Cuba. His detainee ID number is 131. Joint Task Force Guantanamo counter-terrorism analysts reports that Hadi was born on January 15, 1976, in Hadhramaut, Yemen.

He was transferred to Saudi Arabia on January 5, 2017. The transfer of Hadi, and more than a dozen other men, in the closing days of the Barack Obama Presidency was seen as marking a key disagreement between Obama and President-elect Donald Trump, who favored expanding the camp.

== Inconsistent identification ==
Salem was named inconsistently on the official lists:

- He was named Salem Ahmed Ben Kend on the list of names released on April 20, 2006.
- He was named Salem Ahmed Hadi on the list of names released on May 15, 2006.
- He was named Salim Ahmed Haddi Hathramoot on his 2008 Joint Task Force Guantanamo assessment.

== Official status reviews ==
Originally the Bush Presidency asserted that captives apprehended in the "war on terror" were not covered by the Geneva Conventions, and could be held indefinitely, without charge, and without an open and transparent review of the justifications for their detention. In 2004 the United States Supreme Court ruled, in Rasul v. Bush, that Guantanamo captives were entitled to being informed of the allegations justifying their detention, and were entitled to try to refute them.

=== Office for the Administrative Review of Detained Enemy Combatants ===
Combatant Status Review Tribunals were held in a 3x5 meter trailer where the captive sat with his hands and feet shackled to a bolt in the floor.

Following the Supreme Court's ruling the Department of Defense set up the Office for the Administrative Review of Detained Enemy Combatants.

Scholars at the Brookings Institution, led by Benjamin Wittes, listed the captives still held in Guantanamo in December 2008, according to whether their detention was justified by certain common allegations:

- Salem Ahmed Hadi bin Kanad was listed as one of the captives who "The military alleges ... traveled to Afghanistan for jihad."
- Salem Ahmed Hadi bin Kanad was listed as one of the captives who "The military alleges ... took military or terrorist training in Afghanistan."
- Salem Ahmed Hadi bin Kanad was listed as one of the captives who "The military alleges ... fought for the Taliban."
- Salem Ahmed Hadi bin Kanad was listed as one of the captives whose "names or aliases were found on material seized in raids on Al Qaeda safehouses and facilities."
- Salem Ahmed Hadi bin Kanad was listed as one of the captives who "The military alleges that the following detainees were captured under circumstances that strongly suggest belligerency."
- Salem Ahmed Hadi bin Kanad was listed as one of the captives who was a foreign fighter.
- Salem Ahmed Hadi bin Kanad was listed as one of "36 [captives who] openly admit either membership or significant association with Al Qaeda, the Taliban, or some other group the government considers militarily hostile to the United States."
- Salem Ahmed Hadi bin Kanad was listed as one of the captives who had admitted "fighting on behalf of Al Qaeda or the Taliban."

A Summary of Evidence memo was prepared for Salem Ahmed Ben Kend's Combatant Status Review Tribunal, on 7 October 2004. The memo listed the following allegations against him:

Salem did not attend his 2005 Board hearing. But a five-page summarized transcript recorded the discussion of his interview with his Assisting Military Officer.

=== Formerly secret Joint Task Force Guantanamo assessment ===
On April 25, 2011, whistleblower organization WikiLeaks published formerly secret assessments drafted by Joint Task Force Guantanamo analysts. His 9-page Joint Task Force Guantanamo assessment was drafted on April 8, 2008. It was signed by camp commandant Rear Admiral Mark H. Buzby. He recommended continued detention.

=== Joint Review Task Force ===
On January 20, 2009, newly elected President Barack Obama announced that he would try to empty the Guantanamo Bay Detention camps. He replaced the George W. Bush administration's annual OARDEC reviews, by military officers, reviews by high level officials from several government departments - the Joint Review Task Force, to be followed up by regular reviews by a Periodic Review Board.

The Joint Review Task Force's conclusion was that Hadi was too dangerous to release.

=== Periodic Review Board ===
A Periodic Review Board concluded, in May 2016, that Hadi could safely be transferred to another country. This was the fifth time his status had been considered by the Board.

== Transfer to Saudi Arabia ==
Hadi, and three other individuals from Yemen, were transferred to Saudi Arabia on January 5, 2017 - in the closing weeks of Obama's second term. The men were not transferred back to Yemen, their home, because officials judged Yemen too unstable.

The Nigerian Vanguard noted that the final push of the Obama Presidency was in conflict with the incoming administration of Donald Trump to retain all the individuals held in Guantanamo, and to fill it up with additional individuals.
