= Jörg =

German male given name

Jörg or Joerg (German pronunciation: [ˈjœʁk]) is a German name, equivalent to George in English.

- Jörg Bergmeister (born 1976), German race car driver
- Jörg Fisch (1947–2024), Swiss historian
- Jörg Frischmann, German Paralympian athlete
- Jörg Haider (1950–2008), Austrian politician
- Jörg Andrees Elten (also Swami Satyananda; 1927–2017), German journalist and writer, follower of Osho
- Jörg Kachelmann (born 1958), Swiss journalist and presenter
- Joerg Kalt (1967–2007), Austrian film director and cinematographer
- Jörg Meuthen (born 1961), German politician
- Jörg Nobis (born 1975), German politician
- Jörg Pilawa (born 1965), German television presenter
- Joerg Rieger (born 1963), American professor
- Jörg Scheibe (born 1962), German politician
- Jörg Schneider (actor) (1935–2015), Swiss actor

== See also ==
- Jörgen (disambiguation)
- Joerg Peninsula of Graham Land, Antarctica
- W. L. G. Joerg (1885–1952), American geographer and in particular expert in the geography of the Arctic and Antarctic regions
- Norton C. Joerg, lawyer and retired Read Admiral in the United States Navy
