= Saeed Jarabh =

Yemeni prisoner (born 1976)

Saeed Ahmed Mohammed Abdullah Sarem Jarabh
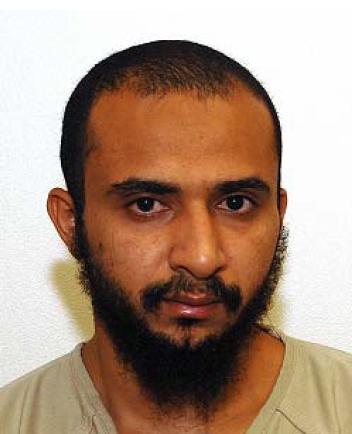
- Born: May 14, 1978 (age 48); Al Hudaydah, Yemen
- Detained at: Guantanamo
- ISN: 235
- Status: Transferred to the United Arab Emirates

Saeed Ahmed Mohammed Abdullah Sarem Jarabh is a citizen of Yemen who was held in extrajudicial detention for over fourteen years in the United States Guantanamo Bay Naval Base, in Cuba. Joint Task Force Guantanamo analysts estimated that he was born on May 14, 1978 in Al Hudaydah, Yemen.

He was transferred to United Arab Emirates, with fourteen other men, on August 15, 2016.

During the Bush presidency, OARDEC review boards classed him as an "enemy combatant". The Obama presidency replace OARDEC with the Guantanamo Joint Review Task Force, which recommended continued indefinite detention, a status commentators characterized as a "forever prisoner". A Periodic Review Board cleared him for release on March 18, 2015.

Scholars at the Brookings Institution, led by Benjamin Wittes, listed the captives still held in Guantanamo in December 2008, according to whether their detention was justified by certain common allegations:

- Saeed Ahmed Mohammed Abdullah Sarem Jarabh was listed as one of the captives who "The military alleges ... are members of Al Qaeda."
- Saeed Ahmed Mohammed Abdullah Sarem Jarabh was listed as one of the captives who "The military alleges ... took military or terrorist training in Afghanistan."
- Saeed Ahmed Mohammed Abdullah Sarem Jarabh was listed as one of the captives who "The military alleges ... were at Tora Bora."
- Saeed Ahmed Mohammed Abdullah Sarem Jarabh was listed as one of the captives who was a foreign fighter.
- Saeed Ahmed Mohammed Abdullah Sarem Jarabh was listed as one of the captives who had "denied all the government allegations."

== Habeas corpus ==
A habeas corpus petition was submitted on his behalf. In 2005, following a Freedom of Information Act request, the Associated Press placed a dossier of documents from his Combatant Status Review Tribunal, for his lawyers.

== Periodic Review Board ==
A Periodic Review Board met to consider his status, on January 27, 2015. The PRB recommended he be transferred from Guantanamo on March 18, 2015. Carol Rosenberg, reporting in the Miami Herald, noted that by the time the PRB considered his status, analysts had quietly dropped the allegation that he had been one of Osama bin Laden's bodyguards, instead calling him a "low level fighter", who "lacked a leadership position in al-Qaida or the Taliban.""" His PRB explained their decision, in part, due to a "lack of indications that the detainee harbors anti-American sentiments, extremist beliefs or intention to reengage".
