= Abu Aisha =

Abu Aisha may refer to:

- Fazul Abdullah Mohammed (1972 or 1974 – 2011), member of al-Qaeda, and the leader of its presence in East Africa
- Abdel Malik Ahmed Abdel Wahab Al Rahabi, Yemeni who was held in extrajudicial detention by the US 2001–2016
