= Mashur Abdallah Muqbil Ahmed Al Sabri =

Yemeni Guantanamo Bay detainee (born 1977)

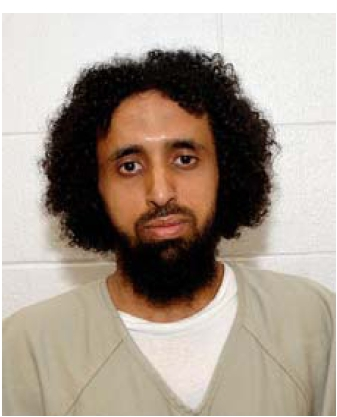
- Mashur Abdallah Muqbil Ahmed al-Sabri, wearing a white uniform issued to compliant individuals.
- Born: December 26, 1977 (age 48); Mecca, Saudi Arabia
- Arrested: 2001; Pakistan; Pakistani border officials
- Released: 2016-04-16; Saudi Arabia
- Citizenship: Yemen
- ISN: 324
- Charge: extrajudicial detention
- Status: transferred to Saudi Arabia

Mashur Abdallah Muqbil Ahmed Al Sabri (born December 26, 1977) is a citizen of Yemen who was held in extrajudicial detention in the United States Guantanamo Bay detainment camps, in Cuba until April 16, 2016. Al Sabri's Guantanamo detainee ID number is 324.

== Official status reviews ==
Originally the Bush Presidency asserted that captives apprehended in the "war on terror" were not covered by the Geneva Conventions, and could be held indefinitely, without charge, and without an open and transparent review of the justifications for their detention.

In 2004, the United States Supreme Court ruled, in Rasul v. Bush, that Guantanamo captives were entitled to being informed of the allegations justifying their detention, and were entitled to try to refute them.

=== Office for the Administrative Review of Detained Enemy Combatants ===
Combatant Status Review Tribunals were held in a 3x5 meter trailer where the captive sat with his hands and feet shackled to a bolt in the floor.

Following the Supreme Court's ruling, the Department of Defense set up the Office for the Administrative Review of Detained Enemy Combatants.

Scholars at the Brookings Institution, led by Benjamin Wittes, listed the captives still held in Guantanamo in December 2008, according to whether their detention was justified by certain common allegations:

- Mashur Abdallah Muqbil Ahmed Al Sabri was listed as one of the captives who "The military alleges ... associated with either" the Taliban or al Qaeda.
- Mashur Abdallah Muqbil Ahmed Al Sabri was listed as one of the captives who "The military alleges ... traveled to Afghanistan for jihad."
- Mashur Abdallah Muqbil Ahmed Al Sabri was listed as one of the captives who "The military alleges that the following detainees stayed in Al Qaeda, Taliban or other guest- or safehouses."
- Mashur Abdallah Muqbil Ahmed Al Sabri was listed as one of the captives who "The military alleges ... fought for the Taliban."
- Mashur Abdallah Muqbil Ahmed Al Sabri was listed as one of the captives who "The military alleges ... were at Tora Bora."
- Mashur Abdallah Muqbil Ahmed Al Sabri was listed as one of the captives whose "names or aliases were found on material seized in raids on Al Qaeda safehouses and facilities."
- Mashur Abdallah Muqbil Ahmed Al Sabri was listed as one of the captives who was an "al Qaeda operative".
- Mashur Abdallah Muqbil Ahmed Al Sabri was listed as one of the "82 detainees made no statement to CSRT or ARB tribunals or made statements that do not bear materially on the military’s allegations against them."

=== Formerly secret Joint Task Force Guantanamo assessment ===
On April 25, 2011, whistleblower organization WikiLeaks published formerly secret assessments drafted by Joint Task Force Guantanamo analysts. His 12-page Joint Task Force Guantanamo assessment was drafted on September 15, 2008. It was signed by camp commandant Rear Admiral David M. Thomas Jr. He recommended continued detention.

== Transfer to Saudi Arabia ==
Al Sabri and eight other Yemenis were transferred to Saudi Arabia on April 16, 2016.
