= Mansour Nasser al Bihani =

- Arrested: Saudi Arabia
- Died: 2007; Somalia
- Citizenship: Yemen
- Detained at: Yemen
- Other name: Abu 'Asim al Tabuki

Mansour Nasser al Bihani is a citizen of Yemen who is reported to have died fighting in Somalia in 2007. He is reported to have been "killed in a clash with American forces off the coast of Somalia." A martyrdom statement was published on November 26, 2011.

He is reported to have emigrated to Afghanistan, with Abdul Aziz bin Attash, and his family, who, like al Bihani, was a Yemeni who also had brothers who were Guantanamo captives. He is reported to have fought in Chechnya under Ibn Al Khattab, until he was wounded and returned to Afghanistan. He is reported to have been captured in Saudi Arabia, and transferred to the custody of Yemen. He is reported to have been one of the 23 militants who succeeded in escaping from Yemeni custody in 2006. He is reported to have finally travelled to Somalia, where he died fighting for jihadists.

His two brothers in Guantanamo were Tolfiq Nassar Ahmed Al Bihani and Ghaleb Nassar Al Bihani. A third brother, Zakariya Nasir Awadh al-Bayhani, escaped with him. According to a 2007 report from the Jamestown Foundation both Mansur and Zakariya surrendered to Yemeni authorities later in 2006.

According to Thomas Josceylyn, writing in The Long War Journal, he is reported to have trained fighters of al Shabaab a militant jihadist group allied with al Qaeda. Josceylyn wrote those he trained included Omar Hammami, "an American who serves as a Shabaab commander, propagandist, and recruiter."
