= Executive Order 13493 =

2009 United States executive order

- Review of Detention Policy Options
- Type: Executive order
- Number: 13493
- President: Barack Obama
- Signed: January 22, 2009

Federal Register details
- Federal Register document number: E9-1895

Summary
- Established the Special Task Force on Detainee Disposition; Instructed the Special Task Force to review options for detention of "individuals captured or apprehended in connection with armed conflicts and counterterrorism operations"

Executive Order 13493 is an Executive Order issued by United States President Barack Obama ordering the identification of lawful alternatives to the detention of captives in the Guantanamo Bay detention camps, in Cuba. The full title of the order is Executive Order 13493 - Review of Detention Policy Options. In his previous order, Executive Order 13492, Obama had ordered the camps' closure within a year, but Guantanamo Bay detention camp has still yet to be closed. As of January 6, 2025, 15 detainees remain at Guantanamo Bay.

Executive Order 13493 was a follow-up to Executive Order 13492; in it, Obama had laid out the Special Interagency Task Force. Its job was to find lawful options of places to relocate prisoners.

== Membership ==
- The Attorney General, Co-chair
- The Secretary of Defense, Co-chair
- The Secretary of State
- The Secretary of Homeland Security
- The Director of National Intelligence
- The Director the CIA
- The Chairman of the Joint Chiefs of Staff
- Any other officers employed by the United States, chosen by the Co-Chairs with the consent of the heads of the departments or agencies concerned.

== Staff ==
Either Co-chair was responsible to designate offices and employees within departments. Other agencies could request to work on the Special Interagency Task Force with the approval of the Co-Chairs and the heads of the agency they came from.

== Operation ==
The Co-Chairs were in charge of meetings; they determined agendas and directed the agency's work. The Co-Chairs could make and direct subgroups that were staffed only by workers of the Special Interagency Task Force.

== Mission ==
"The mission of the Special Task Force shall be to conduct a comprehensive review of the lawful options available to the Federal Government with respect to the apprehension, detention, trial, transfer, release, or other disposition of individuals captured or apprehended in connection with armed conflicts and counterterrorism operations, and to identify such options as are consistent with the national security and foreign policy interests of the United States and the interests of justice."

== Administration ==
The task force was for administrative purposes within the Department of Justice who supported and funded the Special Task Force.

== Report ==
The Special Task Force was directed to give the President a report through the Assistant to the President for National Security Affairs and the council to the President on the operation of the task force.

== Termination ==
The co-chair could terminate the task force when its duties were complete. It issued its final report in January 2010.
