= Abdulla Ahmed (disambiguation) =

Abdulla Ahmed may refer to:

- Abdullah Ahmad (1933–2016), Malaysian journalist
- Abdullah Ahmad Badawi (1939–2025), Malaysian prime minister
- Abdullah Ahmad (cleric) (1878–1933), Islamic cleric and reformist
- Abdullah Tabarak Ahmad (born 1955), Guantanamo Bay detainee
- Abdulla Ahmed (born 2002), Baharani swimmer
- Abdullah Ahmed Abdullah (1963–2020), high-ranking member of al-Qaeda
- Abdullah Ahmed Al-Remi (born 1974), member of al-Qaeda

== See also ==
- Ahmad Hassan Abdullah (born 1981), Qatari runner
- Abdullah Ahmed Khadr (born 1981), Canadian militant
- Abdullah Ahmadzai (born 2003), Afghani cricketer
- Abdallah Abdalsalam (born 1983), Egyptian voleyball player
