= Mohammed Ahmed Said Haidel =

Yemeni former U.S. prisoner

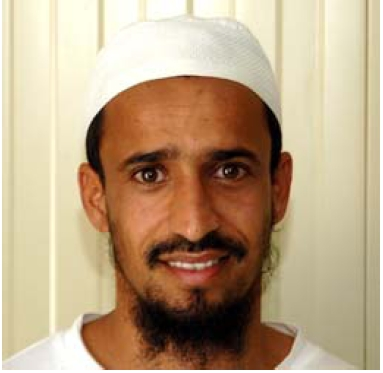
- Born: 1978 (age 47–48); Taiz, Yemen
- Detained at: Guantanamo
- ISN: 498
- Charge: No charge
- Status: Transferred to Oman on 2017-01-16

Mohammed Ahmed Said Haidel is a citizen of Yemen, who was held in extrajudicial detention in the United States Guantanamo Bay detention camps, in Cuba. His Guantanamo Internment Serial Number is 498. Joint Task Force Guantanamo counter-terrorism analysts estimate that he was born in 1978, in Taiz, Yemen.

He was transferred to Oman with nine other men, on January 16, 2017.

== Inconsistent identification ==
Haidel was identified inconsistently on official Department of Defense documents:

- He was identified as Mohammed Ahmed Said Haidel on the Summary of Evidence memo prepared for his Combatant Status Review Tribunal, on October 8, 2004.
- He was identified as Mohammed Mohammed Ahmen Said on the Summary of Evidence memos prepared for his first and second annual Administrative Review Board hearings, on September 28, 2005, and June 7, 2006.

== Press reports ==
On July 12, 2006, the magazine Mother Jones provided excerpts from the transcripts of a selection of the Guantanamo detainees. Haidel was one of the detainees profiled. According to the article, his transcript contained the following comment:

When I was in the Kandahar prison, the interrogator hit my arm and told me I received training in mortars. As he was hitting me, I kept telling him, "No, I didn't receive training." I was crying and finally I told him I did receive the training. My hands were tied behind my back and my knees were on the ground and my head was bleeding. I was in a lot of pain, so I said I had the training. At that point, with all my suffering, if he had asked me if I was Osama bin Laden, I would have said yes…. Am I an enemy of the United States? I never knew any Americans until I came to this prison. Americans should know who their real enemies are. What is my crime for being here for three years? That is all I would like to say.

== Official status reviews ==
Originally, the Bush Presidency asserted that captives apprehended in the "war on terror" were not covered by the Geneva Conventions, and could be held indefinitely, without charge, and without an open and transparent review of the justifications for their detention. In 2004, the United States Supreme Court ruled, in Rasul v. Bush, that Guantanamo captives were entitled to being informed of the allegations justifying their detention, and were entitled to try to refute them.

=== Office for the Administrative Review of Detained Enemy Combatants ===
Combatant Status Review Tribunals were held in a 3x5 meter trailer where the captive sat with his hands and feet shackled to a bolt in the floor.

Following the Supreme Court's ruling the Department of Defense set up the Office for the Administrative Review of Detained Enemy Combatants.

Scholars at the Brookings Institution, led by Benjamin Wittes, listed the captives still held in Guantanamo in December 2008, according to whether their detention was justified by certain common allegations:

- Mohammed Ahmed Said Haidel was listed as one of the captives who(m):

- "The military alleges ... are associated with both Al Qaeda and the Taliban."
- "The military alleges ... traveled to Afghanistan for jihad."
- "The military alleges that the following detainees stayed in Al Qaeda, Taliban or other guest- or safehouses."
- "The military alleges ... took military or terrorist training in Afghanistan."
- "The military alleges ... fought for the Taliban."
- "The military alleges ... were at Tora Bora."
- was a foreign fighter.

- Mohammed Ahmed Said Haidel was listed as one of the "82 detainees made no statement to CSRT or ARB tribunals or made statements that do not bear materially on the military's allegations against them."

A Summary of Evidence memo was prepared for Mohammed Ahmed Said Haidel's Combatant Status Review Tribunal, on October 8, 2004.

Haidel chose to participate in his Combatant Status Review Tribunal. On March 3, 2006, in response to a court order from Jed Rakoff the Department of Defense published a three-page summarized transcript from his Combatant Status Review Tribunal.
