= Periodic Review Secretariat =

United States government body overseeing Guantanamo Bay extrajudicial detention

The Periodic Review Secretariat is a body authorized by President Barack Obama in Executive Order 13567, on March 7, 2011. The Secretariat oversees Periodic Review Boards. The Boards convene hearings to make recommendations about selected individuals held in extrajudicial detention in the United States Guantanamo Bay detention camps, in Cuba.

In January 2009 Obama authorized another body, the Guantanamo Review Task Force, to review the files on all the remaining individuals being held in Guantanamo. That body's mandate was to recommend classifying the men into three different groups: individuals who should face charges; individuals who it would be safe to release; and individuals for whom there was no evidence to justify charges, who nevertheless should be held indefinitely, because it was too dangerous to release them. The Guantanamo Review Task Force recommended splitting the remaining captives into three groups of approximately eighty men each. The men who faced indefinite detention without charge were the ones whose files were to be periodically reviewed.

Some press reports compared the Periodic Review Boards to parole boards in the criminal justice system.
