= Al-Asadi v. Bush =

American writ of habeas corpus

- Court: United States District Court for the District of Columbia
- Full case name: Mohammed Ahmed Ali Al-Asadi v. George W. Bush, et al.
- Docket nos.: 1:05-cv-02197

Case history
- Related actions: Boumediene v. Bush, 553 U.S. 723 (2008)

Court membership
- Judge sitting: Henry H. Kennedy

Al-Asadi v. Bush, No. 1:05-cv-02197, is a writ of habeas corpus filed on behalf of Guantanamo detainee Mohammed Ahmed Ali Al Asadi before US District Court Judge Henry H. Kennedy. It was one of over 200 habeas corpus petitions filed on behalf of detainees held in the Guantanamo Bay detention camp in Cuba.

== Military Commissions Act ==
The Military Commissions Act of 2006 mandated that Guantanamo captives were no longer entitled to access the US civil justice system, so all outstanding habeas corpus petitions were stayed.

== Cited in other habeas petitions ==
Kennedy's ruling, lifting a stay imposed upon habeas petitions in 2005, pending the resolution of Boumediene v. Bush, was cited in several other habeas petitions.

== Boumediene v. Bush ==
On June 12, 2008, the United States Supreme Court ruled, in Boumediene v. Bush, that the Military Commissions Act could not remove the right for Guantanamo captives to access the US Federal Court system. And all previous Guantanamo captives' habeas petitions were eligible to be re-instated. The judges considering the captives' habeas petitions would be considering whether the evidence used to compile the allegations the men and boys were enemy combatants justified a classification of "enemy combatant".

== Re-initiation ==
Al Asidi's petition was renewed, as a former captive seeking relief for his former detention. On July 3, 2008, US District Court Judge Thomas F. Hogan issued an order regarding former Guantanamo captives, who might seek relief for their former detentions. That order gave their attorneys until July 14 to respond with a brief status report, if they wanted to continue to proceed. Al Asadi's habeas petition was one of those on Justice Hogan's list.

On July 9, 2008, Zachary Katznelson filed a statement summarizing the status of this petition, and several others.

On July 14, 2008, Andrew I. Warden, a department of Justice official, submitted a motion requesting this and other petitions be dismissed.
