= Mahmoud Abd Al Aziz Abd Al Mujahid =

Yemeni Guantanamo Bay detainee (born 1977)

Mahmud Abd Al Aziz al-Mujahid
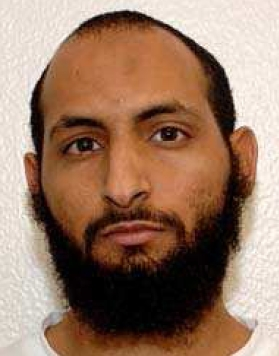
- Mahmud Abd Al Aziz al-Mujahid wearing the white uniform issued to compliant individuals
- Born: August 1, 1980 (age 46); Taiz, Yemen
- Released: 27 October 2021; Mukalla, Yemen
- Citizenship: Yemen
- Detained at: Guantanamo
- ISN: 31
- Charge: N/A (extrajudicial detention)
- Status: Released

Mahmoud Abd Al Aziz Abd Al Mujahid is a Yemeni citizen who was held in extrajudicial detention in the United States Guantanamo Bay detainment camp, in Cuba, for over fourteen and a half years, from January 11, 2002, to August 15, 2016. His Guantanamo Internment Serial Number was 31. Joint Task Force Guantanamo analysts report that he was born on August 1, 1980, in Taiz, Yemen.

He arrived in the first cohort of twenty individuals who opened the prison. The Guantanamo Joint Review Task Force classed him as a "forever prisoner", in 2009. He was transferred to United Arab Emirates, with fourteen other men, on August 15, 2016. He was repatriated to Yemen on 27 October 2021.

== Official status reviews ==
Originally, the Bush Presidency asserted that captives apprehended in the "war on terror" were not covered by the Geneva Conventions, and could be held indefinitely, without charge, and without an open and transparent review of the justifications for their detention. In 2004, the United States Supreme Court ruled, in Rasul v. Bush, that Guantanamo captives were entitled to being informed of the allegations justifying their detention, and were entitled to try to refute them.

=== Office for the Administrative Review of Detained Enemy Combatants ===
Combatant Status Review Tribunals were held in a 3x5 meter trailer where the captive sat with his hands and feet shackled to a bolt in the floor.

Following the Supreme Court's ruling the Department of Defense set up the Office for the Administrative Review of Detained Enemy Combatants.

Scholars at the Brookings Institution, led by Benjamin Wittes, listed the captives still held in Guantanamo in December 2008, according to whether their detention was justified by certain common allegations:

- Mahmoud Abd Al Aziz Abd Al Mujahid was listed as one of the captives who "The military alleges ... are associated with Al Qaeda."
- Mahmoud Abd Al Aziz Abd Al Mujahid was listed as one of the captives who "The military alleges that the following detainees stayed in Al Qaeda, Taliban or other guest- or safehouses."
- Mahmoud Abd Al Aziz Abd Al Mujahid was listed as one of the captives who "The military alleges ... took military or terrorist training in Afghanistan."
- Mahmoud Abd Al Aziz Abd Al Mujahid was listed as one of the captives who "The military alleges ... fought for the Taliban."
- Mahmoud Abd Al Aziz Abd Al Mujahid was listed as one of the captives who "The military alleges ... were at Tora Bora."
- Mahmoud Abd Al Aziz Abd Al Mujahid was listed as one of the captives whose "names or aliases were found on material seized in raids on Al Qaeda safehouses and facilities."
- Mahmoud Abd Al Aziz Abd Al Mujahid was listed as one of the captives who "The military alleges that the following detainees were captured under circumstances that strongly suggest belligerency."
- Mahmoud Abd Al Aziz Abd Al Mujahid was listed as one of the captives who "The military alleges ... served on Osama Bin Laden’s security detail."
- Mahmoud Abd Al Aziz Abd Al Mujahid was listed as one of the captives who was an "al Qaeda operative".
- Mahmoud Abd Al Aziz Abd Al Mujahid was listed as one of the captives who had "denied all the government allegations."

Al Mujahid chose to participate in his Combatant Status Review Tribunals.

=== Formerly secret Joint Task Force Guantanamo assessment ===
On April 25, 2011, whistleblower organization WikiLeaks published formerly secret assessments drafted by Joint Task Force Guantanamo analysts. His ten-page Joint Task Force Guantanamo assessment was drafted on March 8, 2008. It was signed by camp commandant Rear Admiral Mark H. Buzby. He recommended continued detention.
