= Khaled Qasim =

Yemeni citizen

Khaled Ahmed Qasim
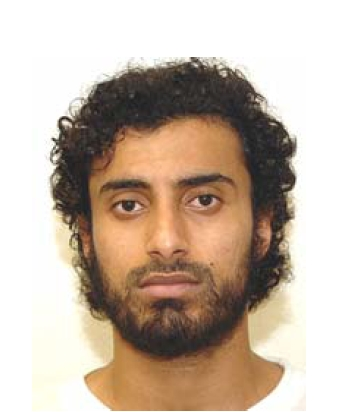
- Born: January 21, 1977 (age 49); Aden, Yemen
- Detained at: Guantanamo
- ISN: 242
- Charge(s): no charge, held in extrajudicial detention
- Status: Released

Khaled Ahmed Qasim (born January 21, 1977) is a Yemeni citizen who was held in extrajudicial detention in the United States Guantanamo Bay detention camp in Cuba.

== Official status reviews ==
Originally the Bush Presidency asserted that captives apprehended in the "war on terror" were not covered by the Geneva Conventions, and could be held indefinitely, without charge, and without an open and transparent review of the justifications for their detention. In 2004 the United States Supreme Court ruled, in Rasul v. Bush, that Guantanamo captives were entitled to being informed of the allegations justifying their detention, and were entitled to try to refute them.

=== Office for the Administrative Review of Detained Enemy Combatants ===
Combatant Status Review Tribunals were held in a 3x5 meter trailer where the captive sat with his hands and feet shackled to a bolt in the floor.

Following the Supreme Court's ruling the Department of Defense set up the Office for the Administrative Review of Detained Enemy Combatants.

Scholars at the Brookings Institution, led by Benjamin Wittes, listed the captives still held in Guantanamo in December 2008, according to whether their detention was justified by certain common allegations:

- Khaled Ahmed Qasim was listed as one of the captives who the military alleges were members of either al Qaeda or the Taliban and associated with the other group.
- Khaled Ahmed Qasim was listed as one of the captives who "The military alleges ... traveled to Afghanistan for jihad."
- Khaled Ahmed Qasim was listed as one of the captives who "The military alleges that the following detainees stayed in Al Qaeda, Taliban or other guest- or safehouses."
- Khaled Ahmed Qasim was listed as one of the captives who "The military alleges ... took military or terrorist training in Afghanistan."
- Khaled Ahmed Qasim was listed as one of the captives who "The military alleges ... fought for the Taliban."
- Khaled Ahmed Qasim was listed as one of the captives who "The military alleges ... were at Tora Bora."
- Khaled Ahmed Qasim was listed as one of the captives whose "names or aliases were found on material seized in raids on Al Qaeda safehouses and facilities."
- Khaled Ahmed Qasim was listed as one of the captives who was a foreign fighter.
- Khaled Ahmed Qasim was listed as one of the captives who "deny affiliation with Al Qaeda or the Taliban yet admit facts that, under the broad authority the laws of war give armed parties to detain the enemy, offer the government ample legal justification for its detention decisions."
- Khaled Ahmed Qasim was listed as one of the captives who had admitted "some form of associational conduct."

Khaled Qasim's CSRT dossier, containing close to a dozen documents, was one of the first 58 the Associated Press acquired through a Freedom of Information Act request, in 2005. The Associated Press subsequently made those dossiers available for download, a year before US District Court Judge Jed Rakoff ordered the DoD to make the names of the Guantanamo captives public.

=== Formerly secret Joint Task Force Guantanamo assessment ===
On April 25, 2011, whistleblower organization WikiLeaks published formerly secret assessments drafted by Joint Task Force Guantanamo analysts. His 13-page Joint Task Force Guantanamo assessment was drafted on April 7, 2008. It was signed by camp commandant Rear Admiral Mark H. Buzby. He recommended continued detention.

== Conversation with Arun Rath ==
In January 2017, National Public Radio reporter Arun Rath produced an episode for the PBS network series Frontline about Mansur al-Dayfi, who was transferred to Serbia in July 2016. During a follow-up visit to Guantanamo, in a lapse from the JTF-GTMO rules, he allowed Khaled Qasim to have a conversation with him. Although Rath was forced to shut off his recording devices he recounted for his documentary some of the details of the conversation that followed. When he texted al-Dayfi to tell him of the conversation al-Dayfi identified Qasim as his best friend, and was too overcome by emotion to continue.

Qasim said he had had four reviews, and feared he would be held in Guantanamo forever.

== Op-ed published in the Guardian, on October 13, 2017 ==
On October 13, 2017, The Guardian published an op-ed that Qasim dictated to one of his lawyers, detailing a change in Guantanamo's medical practices. Up until September 20, 2017, it was medical policy to force-feed Guantanamo hunger-strikers when their weight fell dangerously low. However, according to Qasim, on that date, the camp's senior medical officer addressed the remaining hunger strikers, including Qasim, telling them that they would no longer be force-fed.

Military spokesmen denied that there had been a policy change. They asserted it was still official policy to start force-feeding, to prevent individuals dying. They suggested that the camp's medical authorities were merely changing the danger threshold where they would begin force-feeding.

== Art ==
In 2017, Qasim created a painting called Titanic while detained at Guantanamo Bay. The artwork was one of seven works created by inmates and it was displayed at John Jay College, New York in the autumn of 2017.

== Release ==
Qasim and 10 other detainees were transferred to Oman on January 6, 2025.
