= Norton C. Joerg =

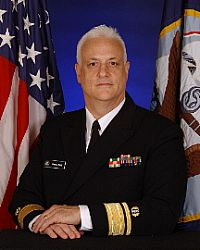
- Military career
- Allegiance: United States
- Branch: United States Navy
- Rank: Rear Admiral
- Other work: Work with the Periodic Review Secretariat

Norton C. Joerg is a lawyer and retired Rear Admiral in the United States Navy.

Joerg is only the ninth navy reserve attorney to reach flag rank.

After his retirement Joerg was appointed to a senior position in the Periodic Review Secretariat.
