= Sawah Ring =

Village in Malaysia

Sawah Ring is a village in Tangkak District, Johor, Malaysia. This village is famous for the Mount Ledang scenery that can be seen from the paddy field. With a growing number of tourists coming to Sawah Ring, the village is experiencing rapid growth within 50 years of its creation. Sawah Ring consist a total of 6 alleys, Lorong 1, Lorong 2, Lorong 3, Lorong 4, Lorong 5, and Lorong 6. The first three alley are known as Kampung Sawah Ring while the last three are known as Kampung Baru Sawah Ring.
