= Tolfiq Nassar Ahmed Al Bihani =

Saudi Arabian Guantanamo Bay detainee

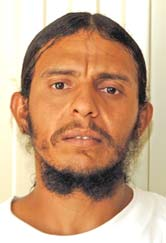
- Born: June 1, 1972 (age 54); Tabuk, Saudi Arabia
- Detained at: CIA black sites, Guantanamo
- Other name: Tawfiq Nassar Ahmed al Bihani
- ISN: 893
- Charge: extrajudicial detention
- Status: Released

Tolfiq Nassar Ahmed Al Bihani (Arabic: توفيق نصار أحمد البيهاني; born June 1, 1972) is a Yemeni citizen born in Saudi Arabia who was held in extrajudicial detention in the United States's Guantanamo Bay detention camps, in Cuba. His Guantanamo Internment Serial Number was 893.

The United States Senate Intelligence Committee's report on the CIA's use of torture confirmed that al Bihani had been held in the Central Intelligence Agency's network of black sites, where he had been subjected to torture.

Al Bihani arrived at Guantanamo on February 7, 2003, and was held there, without charge, for 22 years.

== Publication of captives' CSR Tribunal documents ==
In September 2007 the Department of Justice published dossiers of unclassified documents arising from the Combatant Status Review Tribunals of 179 captives. Al Bihani had a writ of habeas corpus filed on his behalf, but the Department of Defense did not publish it with the others.

== Military Commissions Act ==
The Military Commissions Act of 2006 mandated that Guantanamo captives were no longer entitled to access the US civil justice system, so all outstanding habeas corpus petitions were stayed.

== Boumediene v. Bush ==
On June 12, 2008, the United States Supreme Court ruled, in Boumediene v. Bush, that the Military Commissions Act could not remove the right for Guantanamo captives to access the US Federal Court system. And all previous Guantanamo captives' habeas petitions were eligible to be re-instated. The judges considering the captives' habeas petitions would be considering whether the evidence used to compile the allegations the men and boys were enemy combatants justified a classification of "enemy combatant".

== Protective order ==
On July 15, 2008, Kristine A. Huskey filed a "NOTICE OF PETITIONERS’ REQUEST FOR 30-DAYS NOTICE OF TRANSFER" on behalf of Al Bihani and several dozen captives. The petition would prevent the Department of Defense from transferring him out of US jurisdiction without giving his attorney's thirty days notice. The Department of Defense had transferred some captives to countries where they were subsequently subjected to abusive treatment—even though they had active habeas corpus petitions.

== Habeas timeline ==
George M. Clarke III swore a declaration on September 9, 2008, stating that Al Bihani's brother Adnan Al Bihani, serving as "next friend" initiated the habeas corpus process, in a letter dated June 17, 2005. Clarke and other attorneys formally filed the petition on December 14, 2005. Al Bihani had initially declined to sign a form authoring Clarke to serve as his counsel in 2005. However, when Clarke was able to meet with him on March 28, 2007, Al Bihani verbally authorized him to serve as his counsel, and he followed up that verbal authorization with a letter authorizing him to serve as counsel.

== Named by the US Senate as one of the CIA's captives subjected to torture, without authorization ==
On December 9, 2014, the United States Senate Intelligence Committee published the 600-page unclassified summary of a 6,000-page report on the CIA's use of torture. While some of the CIA's captives were identified as only been subjected to torture that had been authorized from Washington, other captives, like Al Bihani, were identified as having been tortured by CIA officials who did not have authorization. According to the Intelligence Committee, Al Bihani was "subjected to 72 hours of sleep deprivation between his arrival at detention site Cobalt and his October 2002, interrogation."

== Reports his brother was killed fighting in Somalia ==
The Long War Journal reported that a martyrdom statement for Abu 'Asim al Tabuki Mansour Nasser al Bihani was published in November 2011. It reported that this individual had fought in Chechnya, lived in Afghanistan, until the fall of the Taliban, had been captured in Saudi Arabia, transferred to Yemen, where he escaped from prison, and finally travelled to Somalia, where he died fighting for jihadists. It reported that two of his brothers had been detained in Guantanamo.

== Status during the Donald Trump administration ==
Observers noted that President Barack Obama's administration made a push to transfer as many individuals from Guantanamo, as possible, during his last year. The Washington Post reported that Al Bihani was one of the five individuals who had been cleared for release, who remained in Guantanamo when Donald Trump was inaugurated. During the election campaign Trump had promised that, once he took power, no one would ever leave detention at Guantanamo, that he would bring more individuals to be detained there.

== Release ==
Al Bihani and 10 other detainees were transferred to Oman on January 6, 2025.

== See also ==
- Torture
