= Abdel Malik Ahmed Abdel Wahab Al Rahabi =

Citizen of Yemen who was held in extrajudicial detention by the United States

Abdel Malik Ahmed Abdel Wahab Al Rahabi عبد الملك عبد الوهاب الرحابي
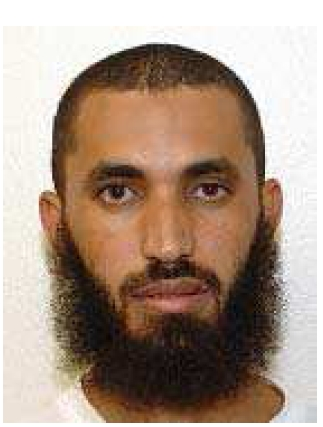
- Born: August 1979 (age 47); Ibb, Yemen
- Arrested: December 2001; Pakistan border crossing Pakistani border guards
- Released: June 22, 2016; Montenegro
- Citizenship: Yemen
- Detained at: Guantanamo
- Other names: Abd al Malik Abd al Wahab, Abd al Malak Abd al-Wahab al-Rahabi, Abu Muaz, Al-Battar al-Yemeni, Abu Aysha, Abu Aisha, Abd al-Malik Al-bu Aisha
- ISN: 37
- Charge(s): No charge, extrajudicial detention
- Status: granted asylum

Abdel Malik Ahmed Abdel Wahab Al Rahabi is a Yemeni prisoner who was held in extrajudicial detention by the United States from December 2001 to June 22, 2016. He was one of the first twenty captives transferred to the Guantanamo Bay detention camps, in Cuba, on January 11, 2002, and was held there until he was transferred to Montenegro, which granted him political asylum.

One of the allegations US intelligence analysts used to justify his detention was that he was captured with a group of thirty Osama bin Laden bodyguards. Historian Andy Worthington, author of The Guantanamo Files, has criticized this allegation as it required taking at face value the denunciations of captives who lacked credibility.

Al Rahabi was a married man when he was captured. His wife had just given birth to a daughter. Al Rahabi was one of the camp's most determined hunger strikers.

== Official status reviews ==
Originally, the Bush Presidency asserted that captives apprehended in the "war on terror" were not covered by the Geneva Conventions, and could be held indefinitely, without charge, and without an open and transparent review of the justifications for their detention. In 2004, the United States Supreme Court ruled, in Rasul v. Bush, that Guantanamo captives were entitled to being informed of the allegations justifying their detention, and were entitled to try to refute them.

=== Office for the Administrative Review of Detained Enemy Combatants ===
Combatant Status Review Tribunals were held in a 3x5 meter trailer where the captive sat with his hands and feet shackled to a bolt in the floor.

Following the Supreme Court's ruling the Department of Defense set up the Office for the Administrative Review of Detained Enemy Combatants.

Scholars at the Brookings Institution, led by Benjamin Wittes, listed the captives still held in Guantanamo in December 2008, according to whether their detention was justified by certain common allegations:

- Abdel Malik Ahmed Abdel Wahab Al Rahabi was listed as one of the captives who the military alleges were members of either al Qaeda or the Taliban and associated with the other group.
- Abdel Malik Ahmed Abdel Wahab Al Rahabi was listed as one of the captives who "The military alleges ... took military or terrorist training in Afghanistan."
- Abdel Malik Ahmed Abdel Wahab Al Rahabi was listed as one of the captives who "The military alleges ... served on Osama bin Laden's security detail."
- Abdel Malik Ahmed Abdel Wahab Al Rahabi was listed as one of the captives who was an "al Qaeda operative".
- Abdel Malik Ahmed Abdel Wahab Al Rahabi was listed as one of the "34 [captives] admit to some lesser measure of affiliation—like staying in Taliban or Al Qaeda guesthouses or spending time at one of their training camps."
- Abdel Malik Ahmed Abdel Wahab Al Rahabi was listed as one of the captives who had admitted "some form of associational conduct."

=== Formerly secret Joint Task Force Guantanamo assessment ===
On April 25, 2011, whistleblower organization WikiLeaks published formerly secret assessments drafted by Joint Task Force Guantanamo analysts. His eleven-page Joint Task Force Guantanamo assessment was drafted on April 28, 2008. It was signed by camp commandant Rear Admiral Mark H. Buzby. He recommended continued detention.

== Asylum in Montenegro ==
The government of Montenegro accepted al Rahabi on June 22, 2016. They explicitly went on record saying that he would be entitled to leave Montenegro and said that giving him asylum would not be a financial burden on Montenegro.

Al Wahab initially found Montenegro a "beautiful country". He was able to bring his wife and teenage daughter to join him in Montenegro, but they experienced culture shock. They found the language very difficult to learn and missed being able to converse with neighbours in Arabic.

Al Wahab was able to move to Sudan. Al Wahab was cautious and asked Montenegro officials to confirm that his travel was okay with the United States.

Once in Sudan, he and his family found other Yemeni expatriates who couldn't return due to the civil war.

== Role in the controversial Guantanamo art program ==
During the Obama administration an art program was provided to enrich the lives of well behaved Guantanamo captives. Art supplies were provided. Some of the paintings and models surprised critics by their quality. Many of the captives were not able to take their work with them. During the Trump administration military spokesperson Anna Leanos explained it was now the DoD's position that the captives did not own their own artwork, and the pieces would be destroyed. Gail Helt, formerly a CIA analyst, and currently a professor, owns a painting sold by Al Rahabi.
