= Executive Order 13492 =

2009 executive order by US President Barack Obama

- Review and Disposition of Individuals Detained at the Guantánamo Bay Naval Base and Closure of Detention Facilities

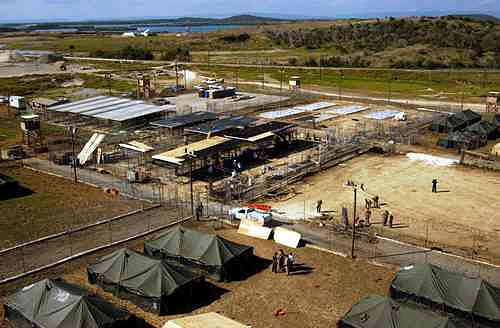
- Camp X-Ray, 2002
- Type: Executive order
- Number: 13492
- President: Barack Obama
- Signed: January 22, 2009

Federal Register details
- Federal Register document number: E9-1893

Summary
- Ordered the closure of Guantanamo Bay detention camp

Executive Order 13492, titled Review and Disposition of Individuals Detained at the Guantánamo Bay Naval Base and Closure of Detention Facilities, is an Executive Order that was signed by United States President Barack Obama on 22 January 2009, ordering the closure of the Guantanamo Bay detention camp in Cuba. This was signed at the same time as Executive Order 13493, in which Obama ordered the identification of alternative venues for the detainees.

Although the order specified that the site should be closed within 12 months, as of September 2025, it remains open.

== Background ==
The Executive Order instructed for the immediate review of the statuses of all individuals detained at the Guantanamo Bay naval base, with the intent to move them out of the facility (either by transferring them, prosecuting them, or by other "lawful means, consistent with the national security and foreign policy interests of the United States and the interests of justice"), followed by closure of detention facilities "as soon as practicable, and no later than 1 year from the date of this order".

When Barack Obama signed executive order 13492, pressure to close the site from nongovernmental organizations such as the Red Cross, Amnesty International, and some American allied governments was high. However, after President Obama signed Executive order 13492 on January 22, 2009, the administration realized that their timeline of closing the facility within the one year promised timeline would not be feasible. The detention facility could not be shut down given that most of the detainees did not have proper paperwork and many had never been tried. After the administration realized that that lack of paperwork and other needed evidence was missing, the process of shutting down Guantanamo Bay was stopped. Furthermore, the prevention of closing the facility made the process of transferring detainees almost impossible. In December 2009, President Obama issued a memorandum directing the secretary of Defense Robert Gates and the Attorney General Eric Holder to make arrangements for detainees at Guantanamo bay be transferred to prisons and facilities inside of the USA. The majority of the prisoners were to be transferred to the Illinois Thomas Correctional Center; however, because of resistance among congress, the closing of Guantanamo Bay was delayed even further. Moreover, two years after the failure of trying to transfer detainees to the mainland, the US Congress removed, in its 2011 Defense Authorization Bill, the funds available for the transition project.

As of January 2021, the facility remained open, with 40 individuals held there.

== Reactions ==
=== National Review ===
In 2015, conservative editorial magazine, National Review, criticised the EO, calling the act an “apology policy" for Western Imperialism that was “very few and recent” in U.S. and American crimes were only being emphasized by the leftists. National Review also accused the order of being too optimistic, contrary to Obama's claim that it was “consistent with the national security and foreign policy interests of the United States and the interests of justice”

=== Vox News ===
Vox News stated that on January 1, 2018, President Donald Trump announced the keeping of the Military Prison of Guantanamo Bay, overriding Obama's 2008 campaign promise of completely closing the prison down within a year. Furthermore, according to Vox News, President Obama failed to effectively enact Executive Order 13492 during his 8-year term because U.S. Congress added restrictions on detainees on moving the prisoners back to the U.S. with trials or detentions. Therefore, in January 2018, Trump was successful in reopening Guantanamo Bay prison, however the administration has yet still not specified under his new policy, what prisoners would be kept in prison other than stating Trump would "...load it up with some bad dudes...” and would detained prisoners associated with Taliban and Al-Qaeda as well as forces who are a threat to " the United States or its coalitions". Vox stated that under the vague criteria, non-traditional or any prisoner could now be held at Guantanamo, already famous for its unusual legal framework as well as abusing the human rights of detainees.
