= David M. Thomas Jr. =

American Navy officer

David M. Thomas
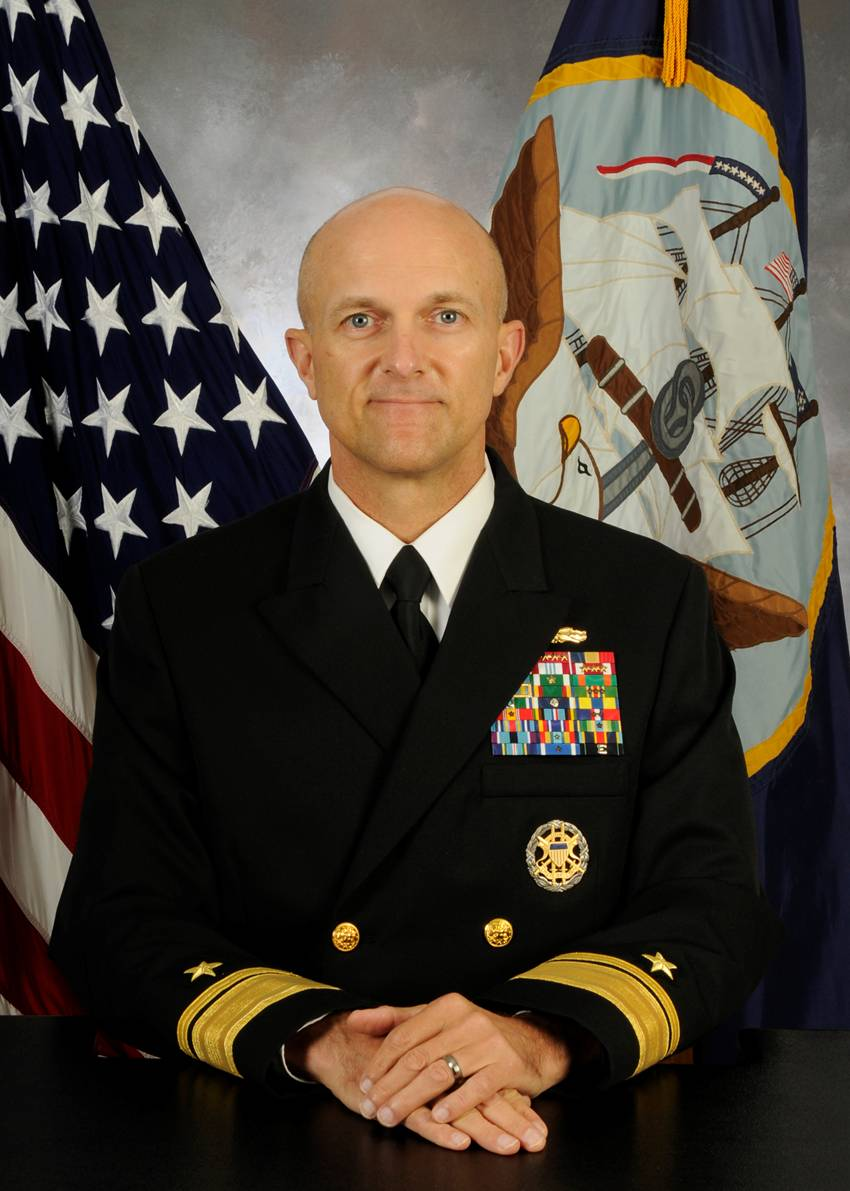
- Rear Admiral (upper half) David Thomas
- Born: 1958 (age 67–68)
- Military career
- Branch: United States Navy
- Rank: Rear Admiral (upper half)
- Commands: JTF-GTMO; Carrier Strike Group Two; Naval Surface Force Atlantic

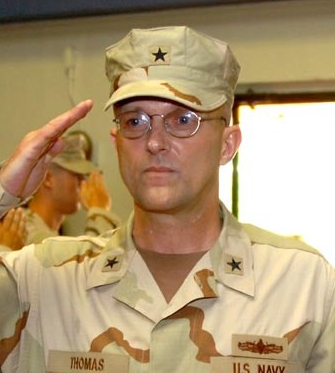
David M. Thomas salutes as he takes command of JTF-GTMO.

David M. Thomas (born 1958) is a former senior officer in the United States Navy.

== Early life ==
Thomas's father was a career Navy officer. Thomas, and three of his brothers, are graduates of the United States Naval Academy. All are retired, including one who was in the Marine Corps. Another brother served in the Peace Corps. His two uncles also were Navy officers via Officers' Candidate School programs. Thomas graduated in 1981.

Thomas was a 1976 graduate of Thomas Sprigg Wootton High School in Rockville, Maryland.

== Navy career ==
In 1999, Thomas commanded the destroyer USS Ross. He has served aboard the USS Shreveport, USS Estocin, USS Willamette, and the USS Leyte Gulf

== 9/11 rescue efforts ==
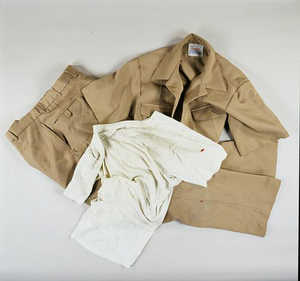
The fire-damaged uniform Thomas was wearing on 9-11.

Captain David Thomas was serving in the Pentagon on September 11, 2001, when al Qaeda hijackers crashed a passenger jet into it, causing an explosion, fire, and consequent injuries and loss of life. Thomas was one of the people who spontaneously volunteered to enter the damaged part of the building to rescue survivors.

When asked about his rescue efforts on September 11, Thomas replied:

I am who I am, a trained sailor who sails ships at sea. You run toward your shipmate in times of trouble.

His fire-damaged uniform is now displayed in the Smithsonian's American History gallery.

== 8th Commander of Joint Task Force Guantanamo ==
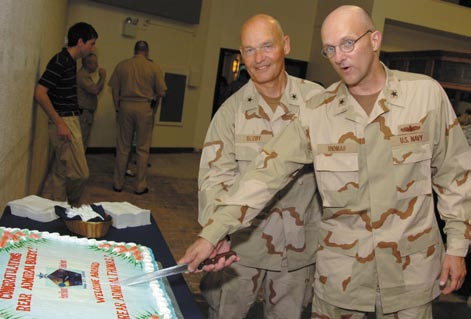
Mark Buzby hands over Joint Task Force Guantanamo to David M. Thomas.

On May 27, 2008, Rear Admiral David Thomas replaced Rear Admiral Mark Buzby to become the 8th Commander of Joint Task Force Guantanamo, and the Guantanamo Bay detention camp.

On April 2, 2009, Thomas defended inviting visiting VIP entertainers to view detainees at Guantanamo. Miss Universe 2008 Dayana Mendoza and Miss USA 2008 Crystle Stewart had both been invited to visit Guantanamo on a USO tour, where they signed autographs. Both women stirred controversy after they published accounts of their visits. Thomas had authorized the women to view captives. Carol Rosenberg, reporting in the Miami Herald, wrote that Thomas "brushed aside" concerns that by allowing civilians to view the captives he was violating the clause in the Geneva Conventions that protect captives from the humiliation of public display.

Thomas asserted that the beauty queens had been allowed to view the detainees in Guantanamo just as if they were reporters.

== Commander, Naval Surface Force Atlantic ==
On July 10, 2009, he began his assignment as commander, Carrier Strike Group 2, serving in that capacity until July, 2010. In July 2010, he was named Commander, Naval Surface Force Atlantic (COMNAVSURFLANT), the senior Surface Warfare Officer (SWO) in the Atlantic Fleet, a position he held until September 4, 2013.

== BAE ==
After he left the Navy Thomas was hired as an executive at BAE Systems Inc., a firm which builds and maintains large vessels, including US Navy vessels. In 2018 he was put in charge of BAE's San Diego facility.
