= Guantanamo Review Task Force =

Guantanamo Review Task Force report of 2010-01-22, made public 2010-05-28

The Guantanamo Review Task Force was created by Executive Order 13492 issued by President of the United States Barack Obama on January 22, 2009, his second full day in office. United States Attorney General Eric Holder announced Matthew G. Olsen as Executive Director of the task force on February 20, 2009. The task force was charged with determining which Guantánamo detainees can be transferred (released), which can be prosecuted for crimes they may have committed, and, if neither of those is possible, recommending other lawful means for disposition of the detainees.

The task force was an inter-agency task force, with the U.S. Department of Justice coordinating the efforts of officials from the U.S. Department of Defense, the U.S. Department of State, and the Department of Homeland Security. The final report was issued January 22, 2010, but not publicly released until May 28, 2010. The Washington Post reported that the "administration sat on the report in the wake of the attempted bombing of a Detroit-bound airliner on Christmas Day because there was little public or congressional appetite for further discussion of its plan to close the military detention center."

Of the 240 detainees considered, the report recommended that 126 detainees should be transferred to their home country or to another country that was willing to accept them, 36 be prosecuted in either federal court or a military commission, 48 be held indefinitely under the laws of war and 30 Yemenis should be approved for transfer if security conditions in Yemen improved. As of January 2017, 41 detainees remain at Guantanamo.

Congressional Representative Frank Wolf criticized the task force claiming it was subjected to political interference from the White House.
