= Office for the Administrative Review of the Detention of Enemy Combatants =

United States military body

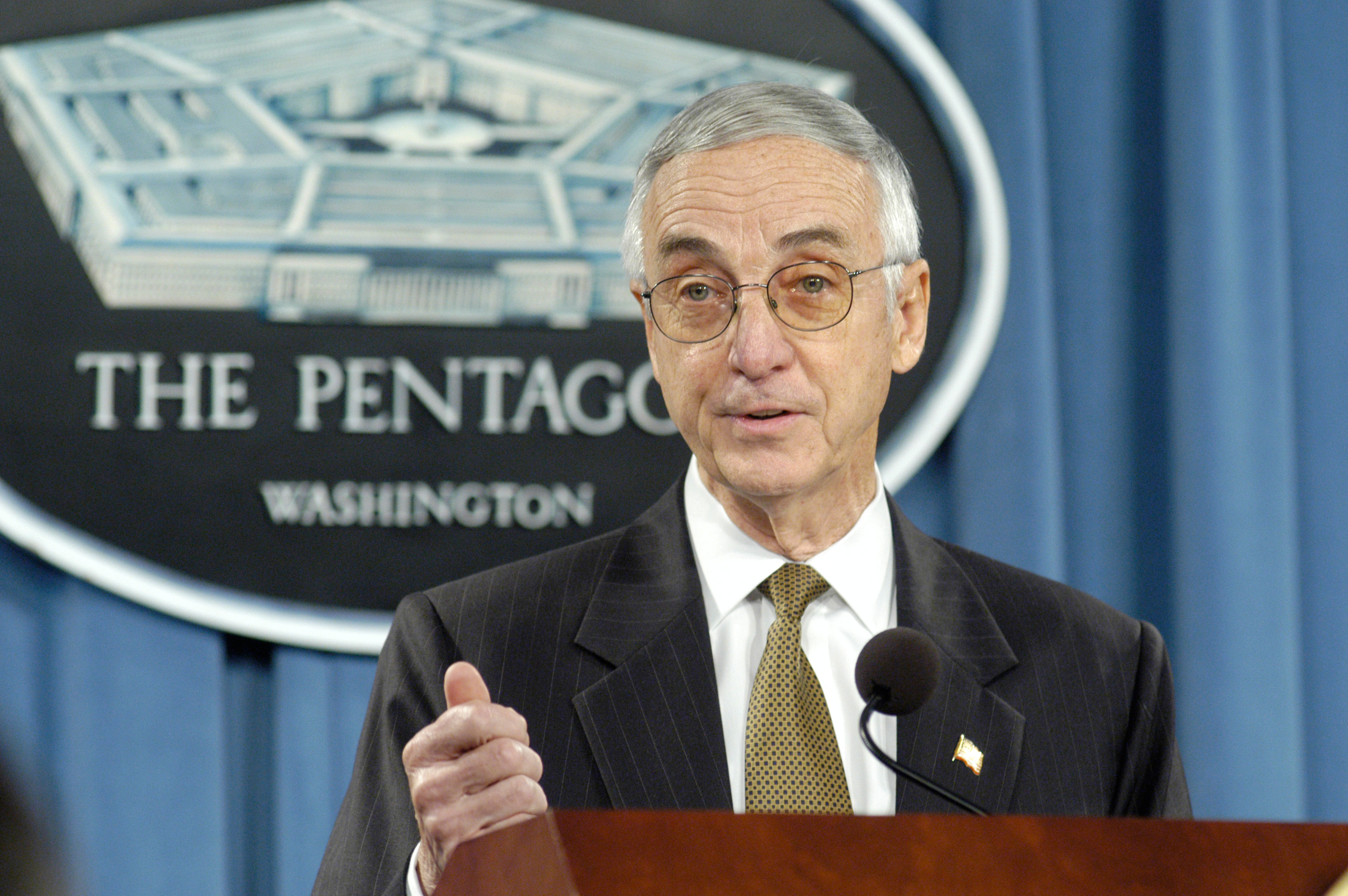
Secretary of the Navy Gordon England announces the results of the first 30 Combatant Status Review Tribunals held at Guantanamo Bay, Cuba, during a Pentagon press briefing on Sept. 8, 2004.

The Office for the Administrative Review of the Detention of Enemy Combatants, established in 2004 by the Bush administration's Deputy Secretary of Defense Paul Wolfowitz, is a United States military body responsible for organising Combatant Status Review Tribunals (CSRT) for captives held in extrajudicial detention at the Guantanamo Bay detention camps in Cuba and annual Administrative Review Boards to review the threat level posed by deemed enemy combatants in order to make recommendations as to whether the U.S. needs to continue to hold them captive.

Most of the Guantanamo captives have had two Administrative Review Board hearings convened to review their continued detention. On June 22, 2007, an appeal on behalf of Guantanamo captive Fawzi al-Odah contained an affidavit from Stephen Abraham, a lawyer and United States Army reserve officer, which was highly critical of OARDEC's procedures.

According to the Washington Post, Abraham felt compelled to come forward after hearing his former boss, Rear Admiral James M. McGarrah call the Tribunal process "fair".

== See also ==
- List of Guantanamo Bay detainees cleared for release in 2009
