= Yasin Qasem Muhammad Ismail =

Yemeni detainee in Guantanamo Bay

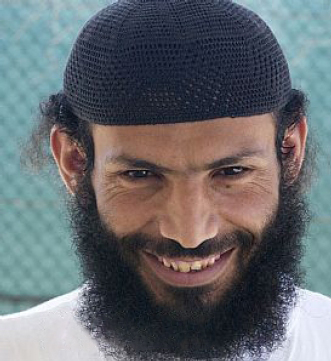
- Born: 1979 (age 46–47); Ibb, Yemen
- Detained at: Guantanamo
- ISN: 522
- Charge(s): no charge, held in extrajudicial detention
- Status: transferred to the United Arab Emirates on January 19, 2017

Yasin Qasem Muhammad Ismail (Arabic: ياسين قاسم محمد إسماعيلي) is a Yemeni who was held in extrajudicial detention in the United States Guantanamo Bay detainment camps, in Cuba. His Guantanamo Internment Serial Number is 522. Joint Task Force Guantanamo counter-terrorism analysts estimate he was born in 1979, in Ibb, Yemen.

Ismail arrived in Guantanamo on May 20, 2002, and was held for nearly 15 years. He was cleared for release in December 2016 and transferred to the United Arab Emirates in January 2017.

== Inconsistent identification ==
The Yemen Times reported, on March 11, 2007, that a Yemeni named Sadeq Mohammed Ismail, who was also born in Ibb, was on the list of Yemenis who had been cleared for release. The official list does not include a captive named Sadeq Mohammed Ismail. It does include two detainees whose names are near matches:

- Sadeq Muhammad Sa'id Ismail's name might be a closer match, but he is from Jabal Haimain, not Ibb.
- Yasin Qasem Muhammad Ismail is from Ibb, but his name is not as close a match.

== Official status reviews ==
Originally the Bush Presidency asserted that captives apprehended in the "war on terror" were not covered by the Geneva Conventions, and could be held indefinitely, without charge, and without an open and transparent review of the justifications for their detention. In 2004, the United States Supreme Court ruled, in Rasul v. Bush, that Guantanamo captives were entitled to being informed of the allegations justifying their detention, and were entitled to try to refute them.

=== Office for the Administrative Review of Detained Enemy Combatants ===
Combatant Status Review Tribunals were held in a 3x5 meter trailer where the captive sat with his hands and feet shackled to a bolt in the floor.

Following the Supreme Court's ruling the Department of Defense set up the Office for the Administrative Review of Detained Enemy Combatants.

Scholars at the Brookings Institution, led by Benjamin Wittes, listed the captives still held in Guantanamo in December 2008, according to whether their detention was justified by certain common allegations:

- Yasin Qasem Muhammad Ismail was listed as one of the captives who "The military alleges ... are associated with Al Qaeda."
- Yasin Qasem Muhammad Ismail was listed as one of the captives who "The military alleges that the following detainees stayed in Al Qaeda, Taliban or other guest- or safehouses."
- Yasin Qasem Muhammad Ismail was listed as one of the captives who "The military alleges ... took military or terrorist training in Afghanistan."
- Yasin Qasem Muhammad Ismail was listed as one of the captives who "The military alleges ... were at Tora Bora."
- Yasin Qasem Muhammad Ismail was listed as one of the captives whose "names or aliases were found on material seized in raids on Al Qaeda safehouses and facilities."
- Yasin Qasem Muhammad Ismail was listed as one of the captives who was a foreign fighter.
- Yasin Qasem Muhammad Ismail was listed as one of the captives who "deny affiliation with Al Qaeda or the Taliban yet admit facts that, under the broad authority the laws of war give armed parties to detain the enemy, offer the government ample legal justification for its detention decisions."
- Yasin Qasem Muhammad Ismail was listed as one of the captives who had admitted "to training at Al Qaeda or Taliban camps".

Ismail chose to participate in his Combatant Status Review Tribunal.

During Ismail's first statement to his Combatant Status Review Tribunal he wrote: "I will talk with you as long as you guarantee me there will be no torture." Ismail said his prior confessions were lies - just to get the torture to stop.

=== Habeas corpus petition ===
Ismail had a writ of habeas corpus submitted on his behalf. After years of delay it was turned down in 2010.

=== Formerly secret Joint Task Force Guantanamo assessment ===
On April 25, 2011, whistleblower organization WikiLeaks published formerly secret assessments drafted by Joint Task Force Guantanamo analysts. His 12-page Joint Task Force Guantanamo assessment was drafted on November 10, 2008. It was signed by camp commandant Rear Admiral David M. Thomas Jr. He recommended continued detention.

== Incident of January 7, 2009 ==
On February 23, 2009, the Christian Science Monitor reported on an incident that occurred on January 7, 2009, where camp authorities version conflicted with that of Ismail. Both camp authorities and Ismail agree that during his exercise period Ismail requested he be moved from his exercise pen, into a nearby empty exercise pen that was exposed to the Sun. He was told, "You are not allowed to see the Sun." According to David Remes, one of Ismail's lawyers, Ismail and his guards engaged in an angry dispute, and a frustrated Ismail, who had not seen the Sun in a month, took off one of his sandals, and threw it at the pen's fence near his guards.

According to Remes, Ismail was left in the exercise pen for hours, until night fell, and he fell asleep. He was woken to find himself being beaten by the camp's "immediate reaction force". Remes said that Ismail told him the immediate reaction force not only shackled him, and beat him, but that they choked him, and then one of the guards urinated on his head. He told Remes that after he was returned to his cell, when he woke the next morning he was bleeding from his ear.

Camp Commandant David M. Thomas claimed Ismail's version was a "complete and total fabrication". According to camp authorities, Ismail had not only thrown his sandal, but he had thrown a book, and he had spit on the guards. Camp authorities characterized the alleged spitting as an "assault".

Camp authorities claimed that the immediate reaction force's extraction was "passive in nature and used the minimum amount of force necessary." They further claimed that the incident had been videotaped, and that Ismail was given a medical examination afterwards, which found no wounds.

However, the Christian Science Monitor noted that camp authorities had refused to release the videotape, or any of Ismail's medical records, including the report from the medical examination camp authorities had asserted showed he had not been wounded.

== June 2009 sit-in ==
Carol Rosenberg, writing for the Miami Herald, reported that Yasin Qasem Ismail participated in a protracted sit-in. Captives' attorney, like Yasin's attorney David Remes, were aware of the sit-in, but were not allowed to tell reporters without violating their classification agreement. Rosenberg said the sit-in involved approximately half the captives held in Camp 5. The captives refused to leave their exercise yard, and in contrast to previous confrontations with the camp authorities, they decided to wait out the protesters, rather than resort to violence.

The sit-in was triggered by increased security measures following the June 1, 2009, apparent suicide of Muhammed Ahmad Abdallah Salih.

== Hunger striker ==
Ismail was a long term hunger striker. In 2013, the Yemen Times quoted him describing the manner of the force-feeding of the hunger strikers as inhumane.
