= Mohammad Ahmed Abdullah Saleh Al Hanashi =

Yemeni Guantanamo Bay detainee (1978–2009)

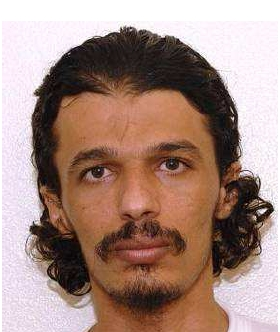
Guantanamo mugshot

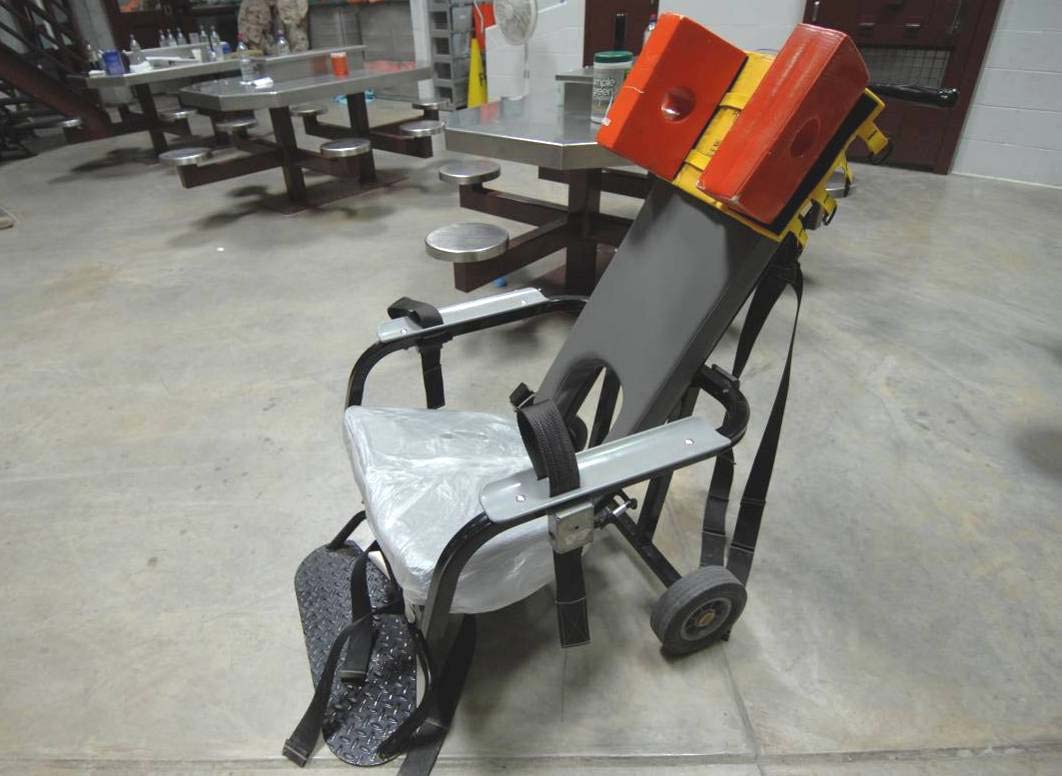
Mohammad Ahmed Abdullah Saleh Al Hanashi was a long term hunger striker, who was fed through a nasal tube, after being immobilized in a restraint chair until shortly before his death.

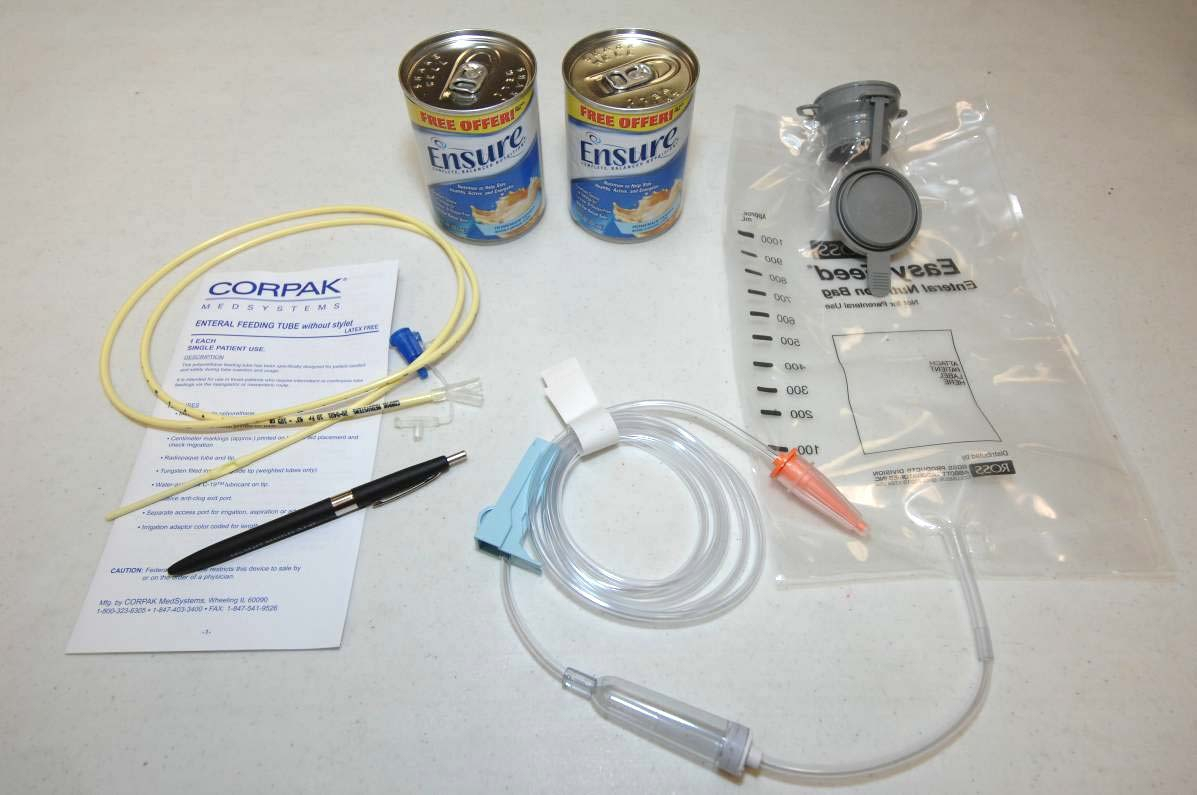
A Guantanamo force-feeding kit.

Mohammad Ahmed Abdullah Saleh Al Hanashi (February 1978 - June 1, 2009) was a citizen of Yemen, held in extrajudicial detention in the United States Guantanamo Bay detainment camps, in Cuba. Al Hanashi's Guantanamo Internment Serial Number was 78. The Department of Defense reports that Al Hanashi was born in February 1978, in Abyan, Yemen.

On June 2, 2009, the Department of Defense reported that a 31-year-old Yemeni captive named "Muhammed Ahmad Abdallah Salih" committed suicide late on June 1, 2009. Camp officials did not allow journalists who were at the camp for Omar Khadr's Guantanamo military commission to report news of his death until they left Guantanamo.

== June 2009 death ==
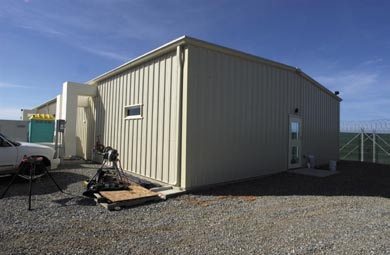
David Remes reports that Mohammad Ahmed was being held in the same psychiatric ward as his client Adnan Latif.

Ahmed was reported to have been found "unresponsive" in his cell late on the night of June 1, 2009. He is reported to have been held in Camp 5, and to have been held in the Guantanamo psychiatric ward. Like all the other men camp authorities claimed were suicides he was on a long term hunger strike, and, consequently, where he was being strapped twice a day into a restraint chair, for force-feeding. The Associated Press reports that his weight had, at one time, dropped to just 86 pounds.

David Remes said that he believed Ahmed had gone without legal representation until a few weeks ago, but that his lawyers hadn't yet had a chance to visit him.

On June 3, 2009, Guantanamo spokesman Lieutenant Commander Brook DeWalt asserted that Mohammed Ahmad was no longer hunger striking at the time of his death, that he had abandoned his hunger strike in "mid-May". According to David McFadden, reporting for the Associated Press wrote:

The military has refused to reveal how they believe Mohammad Ahmed Abdullah Saleh Al-Hanashi died in his cell, other than saying it was an apparent suicide.

DeWalt declined to confirm or refute whether Mohammad Ahmed had been in Guantanamo's Psychiatric unit, and said he didn't know whether he had made previous suicide attempts.

Khalid al-Kathiri, a Yemeni diplomat, traveled to Guantanamo to oversee how the remains were treated. The Miami Herald reported that the Miami Coroner's office had also dispatched an observer.

On June 5, 2009, Saleh's body was returned to Yemen. According to the Associated Press Jose Ruiz, a Guantanamo spokesman, said that the Navy will not make the results of his autopsy public until the Navy Criminal Investigative Service completes its investigation.

On June 11, 2009, Andrew O. Selsky, of the Associated Press, published an article based on interviews with former captives who knew Saleh. Recently released Binyam Mohammed asserted that suicide was totally out of character for Saleh: "He was patient and encouraged others to be the same. He never viewed suicide as a means to end his despair."

Mohammed said that Saleh had been chosen as a prisoner's representative. Mohammed said that Saleh had been escorted from Camp five on January 17, 2009, for a meeting with Admiral David Thomas, commander of Joint Task Force Guantanamo, and Colonel Bruce Vargo, Commander of the camp's guard force. Mohammed said that Saleh never returned to Camp five, and instead was confined to the camp's Psychiatric wing.

Selsky reported that Elizabeth Gilson the attorney for one of the other captives confined to the psychiatric wing, was aware of details of Saleh's death, which she could not disclose because they were classified.

On August 1, 2009, Mike Melia, of the Associated Press reported that, Mohammed Albasha, a Yemeni official said that US authorities had informed the Yemen government that Al Hanashi died of "asphyxiation". The Associated Press quoted fellow captives Yasin Qasem Muhammad Ismail and Adnan Latif, who said Al Hanashi's weight had dropped to under 45 kilograms prior to his death, and that he could only get around on crutches.

== NCIS Investigation Report released in 2016 ==
According to documents released via Freedom of Information Act in 2016, Al Hanashi died by tearing off a piece of elastic underwear and strangling himself to death. Attempts by the Naval Criminal Investigative Service to understand the timeline of events leading up to the death were complicated by the fact that someone at Guantanamo told staff in the Behavioral Health Unit where Al Hanashi was found to turn off all computer logging of events that were then occurring. NCIS was never able to determine who had ordered the database logs shut down. Al Hanashi had made multiple suicide attempts in the month or so prior to his death, and even been put on suicide watch at least once. The description of his underwear type did not comport with other reported rules about the kinds of clothing allowed for Guantanamo inmates. At least one camp staff member interviewed by NCIS said they were surprised when they saw the deceased Al Hanashi wearing clothing that had not been approved. According to the FOIA documents, Al Hanashi was considered a leader among the other detainees, and the day he died had complained to the Chief of the Behavioral Health Unit about proposed changes in the rules governing punishment in that unit. He also complained about being tortured on the day he died, and wrote in a final note that he was very upset when his report was ignored, and said he didn't want to live anymore.

== See also ==
- Guantanamo Bay homicide accusations
- Hunger strike
- Suicide
