= Kathryn Wallace =

American television and film journalist (born 1975)

- Born: Kathryn Ann Wallace; June 9, 1975 (age 51); Yorktown, Virginia, United States
- Occupations: Film and print journalist
- Writing career
- Pen name: Kathryn Ann Wallace
- Period: 1996 - present

Kathryn Ann Wallace (born June 9, 1975) is an American television and film journalist best known for her work as the coordinating producer on the National Geographic television series Lockdown and as a producer on the National Geographic documentary Inside Guantanamo. Wallace has also been published extensively by several major magazines including Reader's Digest.

== Personal life ==
Wallace was born in Newport News, Virginia, to Larry and Ann Wallace. She grew up in Yorktown, Virginia, with three siblings: Emily, Ellen, and Rob. She attended Tabb High School in Yorktown, Virginia. She then attended Brigham Young University in Provo, Utah, where she received a B.A. in Humanities. Later she attended Stanford University and received a master's degree in film journalism.

== Television ==
=== Discovery Channel ===
- Gold Rush, Gold Rush TV series, field producer Talk Show episode, 2012
- Who the Bleep Did I Marry?
- Evil Twins
- Curiosity series

=== PBS ===
- Rise of the Drones NOVA NOVA TV series

=== ABC ===
- Breaking Polygamy 20/20 Airdate: January 26, 2013

==== Hooking Up ====
In an investigation, ABC News takes on the world of online dating in the 5-hour series, Hooking Up.

=== National Geographic ===
==== Lockdown ====
Lockdown is an in-depth look at the US prison system from the prisoner's viewpoint. Episodes focus on gangs, initiations, prison violence, rehabilitation and release. Wallace was the Coordinating Producer for the following episodes:

- Alaskan Justice
- Chaos Control
- County Jail
- Female Felons
- First Timers
- Gangland
- Gang vs. Family
- Gang War
- Inmate U

==== Inside Guantanamo ====
Wallace was a producer for the National Geographic documentary entitled Inside Guantanamo, first broadcast in early April 2009. The film interviewed some key players who played a role in the controversial camp. Colonel Bruce Vargo called the camps: "an integral part of the war on terror." Lieutenant Commander Charles Swift, the Navy lawyer assigned to defend Salim Ahmed Hamdan, said: "Guantanamo Bay was the legal equivalent of outer space -- a place with no law."

Neil Genzlinger, reporting for New York Times, wrote:

Everything in the program, of course, has to be taken with a grain of salt: the soldiers all do and say the right things; the former prisoners (the ubiquitous Moazzam Begg is one) are nonthreatening as can be; and, under the restrictions imposed on the film crew by the military, the current prisoners are not heard from in direct interviews or even seen (thanks to blurring).

== Print ==
=== Investigative Reporting ===
Kathryn is the author of the following articles:

- Ron Paul Staying Busy After Helping to Change Dialogue
- Using the Science of Fear to Make Soldiers Stronger
- America's Brain Drain Crisis
- another link
- Sniper on the Loose
- A Plateful of Trouble
- Home Cheat Home
