= Al Halmandy v. Bush =

2005 American writ of habeas corpus

- Court: United States District Court for the District of Columbia
- Full case name: Abd Al Rahman Abdullah Al Halmandy, et al. v. George W. Bush, et al.
- Docket nos.: 1:05-cv-02385

Case history
- Related actions: Boumediene v. Bush, 553 U.S. 723 (2008)

Court membership
- Judge sitting: Thomas F. Hogan

Al Halmandy v. Bush, No. 1:05-cv-02385, is a writ of habeas corpus filed on behalf of 63 Guantanamo detainees, on December 13, 2005. It was one of over 200 habeas corpus petitions filed on behalf of detainees held in the Guantanamo Bay detention camp in Cuba.

The writ was filed shortly before the passage of the Detainee Treatment Act of 2005, which contained provisions to close off captives' ability to initiate new habeas petitions.

== Seizure of privileged lawyer-client documents ==
On June 10, 2006, the Department of Defense reported that three captives died in custody. The Department of Defense stated the three men committed suicide. Camp authorities called the deaths "an act of asymmetric warfare", and suspected plans had been coordinated by the captive's attorneys—so they seized all the captives' documents, including the captives' copies of their habeas documents. Since the habeas documents were privileged lawyer-client communication the Department of Justice was compelled to file documents about the document seizures. When the Department of Defense reported to the Justice Department the names of the captives whose privileged documents they seized, they were unable to name half of the captives in this petition.

== Military Commissions Act ==
The Military Commissions Act of 2006 mandated that Guantanamo captives were no longer entitled to access the U.S. civil justice system, so all outstanding habeas corpus petitions were stayed.

== Boumediene v. Bush ==
On June 12, 2008, the United States Supreme Court ruled, in Boumediene v. Bush, that the Military Commissions Act could not remove the right for Guantanamo captives to access the U.S. Federal Court system, and all previous Guantanamo captives' habeas petitions were eligible to be re-instated.

On July 18, 2008, Shayana D. Kadidal of the Center for Constitutional Rights filed a status report on Al Halmandy v. Bush No. 05-CV-2385 (RMU) on behalf of seven Guantanamo captives Kadidal wrote that of the 63 captives initially listed in the petition, all but those seven had either been repatriated, or were named in other petitions.

On July 29, 2008, U.S. District Court Judge Thomas F. Hogan ordered that all the other petitioners would be dismissed from the petition, except for:

Seven remaining petitioners on Al Halmandy v. Bush
ISN	name	Kadidal's notes
78	Saleh	Factual return filed on October 30, 2008. As of early December 2008 his attorneys had still not been able to meet with him.
510	Riad Nargeri	Factual return filed on October 29, 2008. As of early December 2008 his attorneys had still not been able to meet with him. A thirty-day protective order was filed on his behalf.
570	Sabry Mohammed	Factual return filed on October 30, 2008. As of early December 2008 his attorneys had still not been able to meet with him.
574	Hamound Abdullah Hamoud Hassan Al Wady	On 21 November 2008 Carlton F. Gunn filed a "NOTICE OF APPEARANCE" with regard to Hamound Abdullah Hamoud Hassan Al Wady (ISN 574) in Civil Action No. 05-cv-2385 (RMC).; A Joint Status Report, filed on December 8, 2008, states: "The Government filed a return containing allegations against Petitioner Al Wady on October 31, 2008. Following entry of the CMO on November 6, 2008, Mr. Al Wady submitted a written request for discovery pursuant to Part I.E.1 of the CMO on November 15, 2008, which discovery the Government has not yet provided. On November 26, 2008, Mr. Al Wady filed a response to the Government's Motion for Clarification and Reconsideration or, in the Alternative, Motion for Certification for Appeal."
743	Muhammed Saad Iqbal Madni	Madni had a duplicate petition in Civil Action No. 06-CV-1674 (RMC), filed September 29, 2006, under the name Qari Saad Iqbal, which he withdrew voluntarily on February 12, 2007. Judge Collyer dismissed that case without prejudice on February 12, 2007.; Pursuant to the Detainee Treatment Act (DTA), petitioner Madni filed a Petition for Review of Combat Status Review Tribunal Determination with the U.S. Court of Appeals for the District of Columbia Circuit on April 3, 2007, No. 07-1083. There is a protective order in place in that case. Madni's DTA petition is still pending before the Court of Appeals.; A Joint Status Report, filed on 8 December 2008, states: "Although his habeas petition remains pending before this Court, counsel for Mr. Madni understands that the Court does not intend to consider his outstanding claims during the present status proceedings."
900	Saki Bacha	Now known as Mohammed Jawad.; Faces charges before a Guantanamo military commission:...accusing him of throwing a hand grenade into a vehicle carrying U.S. and allied personnel in Afghanistan, were sworn on October 9, 2007, and referred for trial on January 30, 2008. It has been widely reported in the news media that Jawad was sixteen years old at the time of the alleged attack...": As of December 2008 no factual return has been filed.
1045	Mohammed Kameen	Faces charges before a Guantanamo military commission:...accusing him of providing material support to hostilities against U.S. and allied armed forces in Afghanistan, were sworn on March 12, 2008, and referred for trial on April 4, 2008.: As of December 2008 no factual return has been filed.

== Known original petitioners dismissed from the petition ==
Known original petitioners on Al Halmandy v. Bush dismissed from the petition
isn	name	notes
005	Abul Aziz Al Matrafi	Privileged attorney client documents seized by camp authorities.
044	Mohamed Rajab	Privileged attorney client documents seized by camp authorities.
046	Saif	Privileged attorney client documents seized by camp authorities.
051	Majed Baryan	Privileged attorney client documents seized by camp authorities.
062	Saud Al Jouhany	Privileged attorney client documents seized by camp authorities.
088	Waqas Mohammed Ali Awad	Privileged attorney client documents seized by camp authorities.
118	Abd Al Rahman Abdullah Al Halmandy	Named on an April 7, 2007 motion to dismiss, because he had "left GTMO".; Privileged attorney client documents seized by camp authorities.
174	Hisham ibn Abd al-Malik	Privileged attorney client documents seized by camp authorities.
196	Moussa	Privileged attorney client documents seized by camp authorities.
215	Sultan Al Shareef	Privileged attorney client documents seized by camp authorities.
326	Abu Rawdah	Privileged attorney client documents seized by camp authorities.
367	Inshanullah	Named on an April 7, 2007 motion to dismiss, because he had "left GTMO".; Privileged attorney client documents seized by camp authorities.
502	Adel	Privileged attorney client documents seized by camp authorities.
627	Dr. Ayman Saeed Abdullah Batarfi	Privileged attorney client documents seized by camp authorities.
678	Fawaz	Privileged attorney client documents seized by camp authorities.
704	Abdu Tawab	Privileged attorney client documents seized by camp authorities.
707	Muhammad Nur Uthman Muhammad	Privileged attorney client documents seized by camp authorities.
717	Abdul Al Hamman	Privileged attorney client documents seized by camp authorities.
721	Abdulla	Privileged attorney client documents seized by camp authorities.
743	Muhammed Saad Iqbal Madni aka Said Madany	Privileged attorney client documents seized by camp authorities.
783	Shamsullah	Named on an April 7, 2007 motion to dismiss, because he had "left GTMO".; Privileged attorney client documents seized by camp authorities.
892	Rafiove bin Bashir	Privileged attorney client documents seized by camp authorities.
900	Saki Bacha aka Mohamed Jawad	Privileged attorney client documents seized by camp authorities.
1017	Zakaria	Privileged attorney client documents seized by camp authorities.
1045	Mohammed Kameen	Privileged attorney client documents seized by camp authorities.
1457	Abdu Ali al Haji Sharqawi	Privileged attorney client documents seized by camp authorities.
1463	Abdulrahman	Privileged attorney client documents seized by camp authorities.
	Abu Baker Shammrany	Privileged attorney client documents seized by camp authorities.
	Abdal Rauf Zalitini	Privileged attorney client documents seized by camp authorities.
	Abdaul Razak Ali-Haj	Privileged attorney client documents seized by camp authorities.
	Abdul Aziz	Privileged attorney client documents seized by camp authorities.
	Abdul Latif	Privileged attorney client documents seized by camp authorities.
	Abdulla Haji	Privileged attorney client documents seized by camp authorities.
	Abdullah	Privileged attorney client documents seized by camp authorities.
	Abdullah ali Saleh	Privileged attorney client documents seized by camp authorities.
	Abdullah Jaffa	Privileged attorney client documents seized by camp authorities.
	Abdulrahman	Privileged attorney client documents seized by camp authorities.
	Abou Yassir Jezairi	Privileged attorney client documents seized by camp authorities.
	Abu Hadifa	Privileged attorney client documents seized by camp authorities.
	Adnan	Privileged attorney client documents seized by camp authorities.
	Ahamed	Privileged attorney client documents seized by camp authorities.
	Ali Kadami	Privileged attorney client documents seized by camp authorities.
	Amar Biloushi	Privileged attorney client documents seized by camp authorities.
	Bital Adel Halami	Privileged attorney client documents seized by camp authorities.
	Khalid Deshire	Privileged attorney client documents seized by camp authorities.
	Khalid Mohammed	Privileged attorney client documents seized by camp authorities.
	Ibrahim Nayif Abdallah Ibrahim	Privileged attorney client documents seized by camp authorities.
	Mahdi Salih	Privileged attorney client documents seized by camp authorities.
	Masoud	Privileged attorney client documents seized by camp authorities.
	Mohamed Fahad Saad Al Zu'bi	Privileged attorney client documents seized by camp authorities.
	Mohammed Abdullah	Privileged attorney client documents seized by camp authorities.
	Mohammed Chinguity	Privileged attorney client documents seized by camp authorities.
	Othman Ali Muhammed Omar	Privileged attorney client documents seized by camp authorities.
	Ridah	Privileged attorney client documents seized by camp authorities.
	Saleh	Privileged attorney client documents seized by camp authorities.
	Salah Deen Ibn Shaikh	Privileged attorney client documents seized by camp authorities.
	Saleh Libi	Privileged attorney client documents seized by camp authorities.
	Salih	Privileged attorney client documents seized by camp authorities.
	Sanjawez Raweel Kameel Weej	Privileged attorney client documents seized by camp authorities.

== Muhammed Saad Iqbal Madni ==
On September 2, 2008, Muhammed Saad Iqbal Madni's lawyers were informed he had been repatriated to Pakistani custody. On September 5, 2008, the Department of Justice filed a motion to have his habeas petition dismissed as moot because he was no longer in U.S. custody. On September 19, 2008, Richard L. Cys, James P. Walsh filed "Petitioner Muhammed Saad Iqbal Madni's response to court order to show cause why his petition should not be dismissed as moot". Madni's lawyers argued his habeas petition should not be dismissed because he was entitled to continue to seek relief if his original detention was not legally justified. Further, his lawyer had not been advised of the conditions agreed upon by the U.S. Government and the Pakistani Government.
