= Guantanamo psychiatric ward =

Part of the Guantanamo Bay detention camp complex

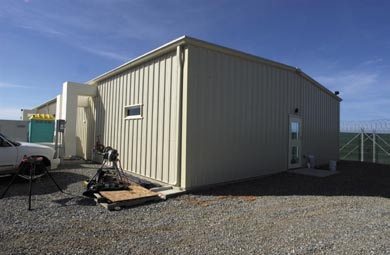
The Guantanamo detention camp complex includes a psychiatric facility.

In addition to the regular camps for detainees held in extrajudicial detention there is a Guantanamo psychiatric ward at the Guantanamo Bay detention camp complex in Cuba. The Department of Defense announced the opening of the psychiatric facility in March 2003. Camp Commandant Geoffrey D. Miller denied that the opening of the psychiatric facility was solely in response to detainees' suicide attempts. Larry C. James was the chief psychologist in 2003.

In April 2008 Adam M. Robinson, the United States Navy's surgeon general, wrote that the "...core psychological health team comprised of one psychologist, one psychiatrist, five behavioral nurses and 14 psychiatric technicians".

On June 7, 2010, The Washington Post reported, after obtaining the first official figures for capital costs of the Guantanamo camps to be made public, that the current building cost US$2.9 million.

== Detainees known to have been held in the psychiatric facility ==
Detainees known to have held in the psychiatric facility
ISN	name	notes
78	Mohammad Ahmed Abdullah Saleh Al Hanashi	Committed suicide in 2009.
156	Adnan Farhan Abdul Latif	Won his habeas corpus in 2010 but died in Guantanamo in 2012.
290	Ahmed Belbacha	Cleared for repatriation.
669	Ahmed Zaid Salim Zuhair	Sent to the psychiatric facility after a meeting with the camp's commandant.
743	Muhammad Saad Iqbal	Pakistani torture victim.
10028	Inayatullah	After his death, of apparent suicide, on May 18, 2011, Inayatullah's lawyer reported that he had spent long periods in the Psychiatric unit.
