= William Jefferson =

William Jefferson may refer to:

- William Jefferson (actor) (1876–1946), American stage and film actor
- William J. Jefferson (born 1947), former Louisiana Democratic congressman
- Will Jefferson (born 1979), English cricketer
- William Jefferson (United Nations employee) (1951–1995), killed serving in Bosnia in the 1990s
- Bill Jefferson (baseball) (1904–1976), American baseball pitcher

== See also ==
- William Jefferson Clinton, full name of former U.S. President Bill Clinton (born 1946)
