= Camp Echo (Guantanamo Bay) =

Guantanamo Bay detention camp

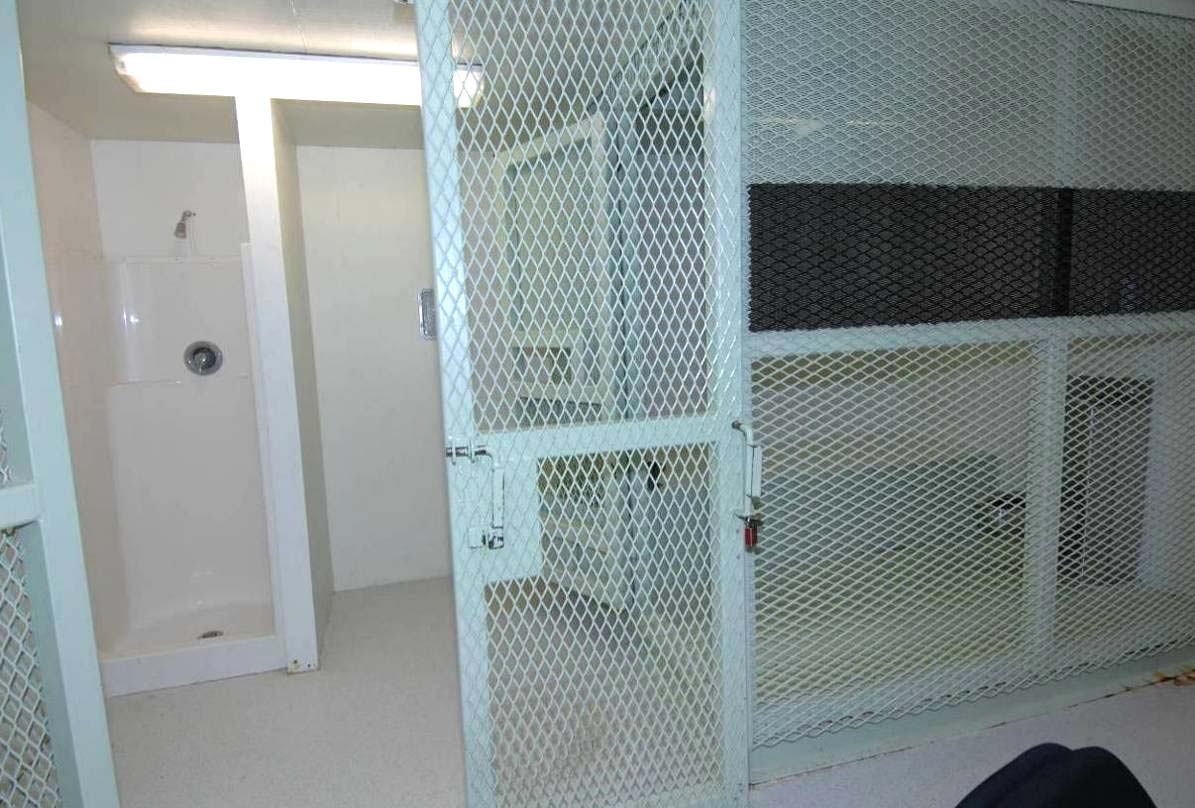
Undated U.S. military image shows cell and shower Camp Echo

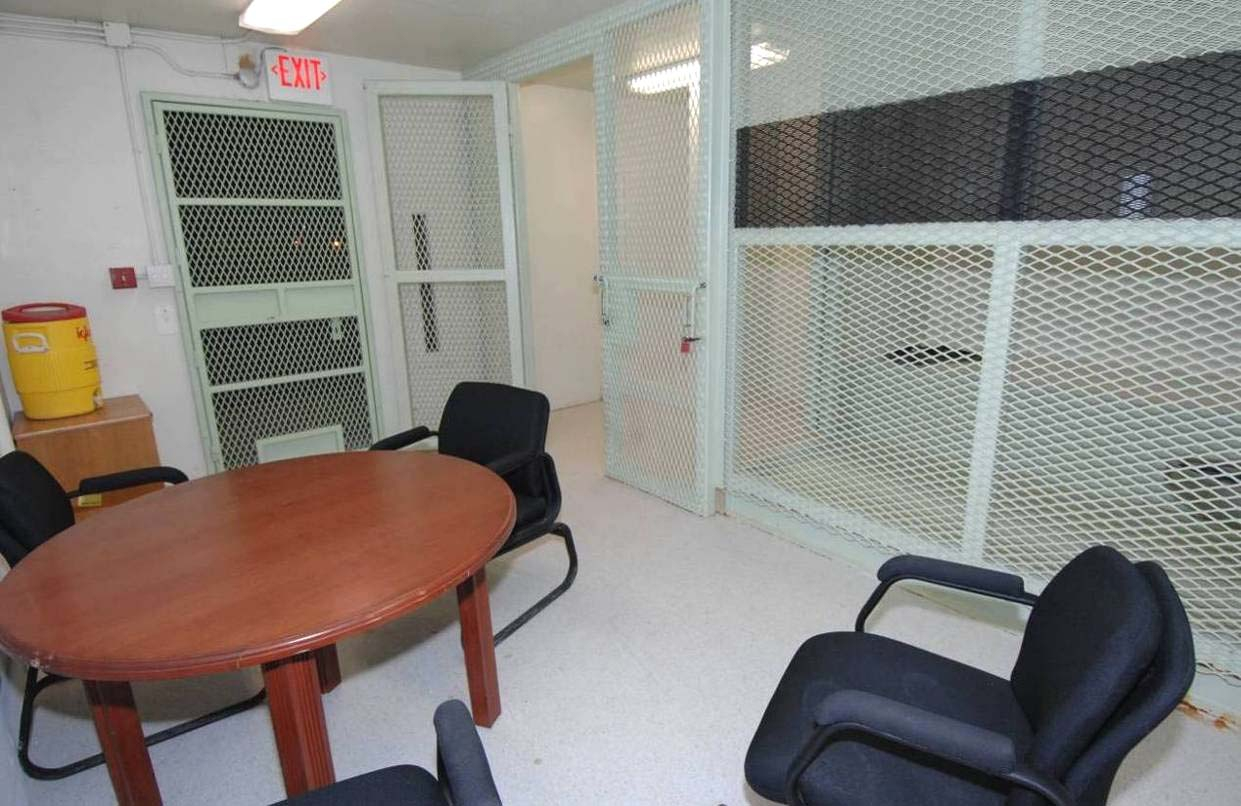
Undated U.S. military image shows a meeting room in Camp Echo

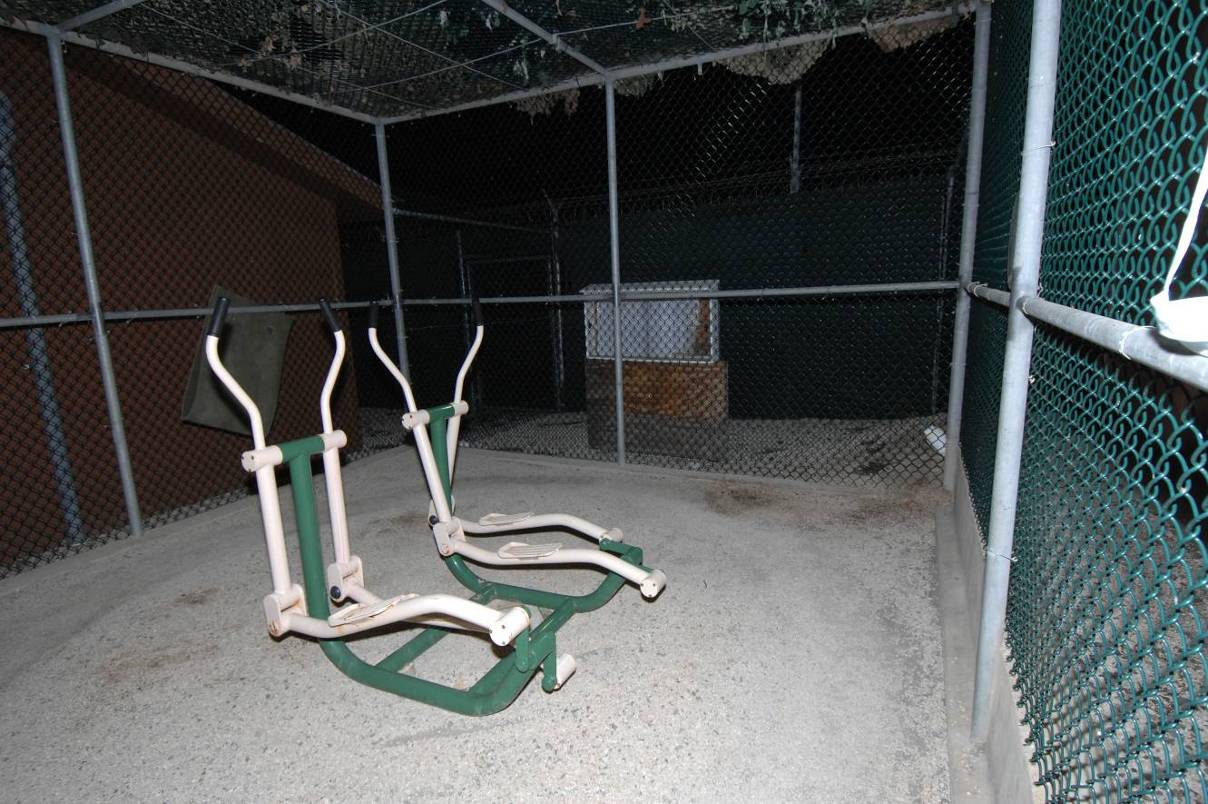
Undated U.S. military image shows exercise yard at Camp Echo

Camp Echo is one of seven Guantanamo Bay detention camps associated with Camp Delta, the prisoners' camp, at the Guantanamo Bay detention camp, run by the United States military. The maximum-security facility is used to hold detainees in solitary confinement, as well as for interrogations by the military.

Housed here are also detainees scheduled for Military Commissions, and those considered "high value detainees" by the Defense Department. In addition, detainees are brought here for private consultation with their attorneys.

As of May 2011, most of the detainees at Camp Echo were so-called "detainees of interest." That month, one of them, Inayatullah (also known as Haji Naseem, ISN 10028) was found dead in the small recreation yard outside his cell at approximately 3:50 am. According to Army investigators, Naseem was allowed to go back and forth to the recreation yard without having the door to his cell locked. In the middle of the night, guards found Naseem hanging from a pole in the fence of the recreation yard, in a noose improvised from one of his bedsheets. Guards were on record as complaining to their superiors about "special privileges" allotted the prisoners at Camp Echo. Naseem was perhaps special because of his psychiatric history and previous suicide attempts, or possibly was special ("of interest") because he was, at least some of the time, cooperating with interrogators.

Camp Echo consists of separate one-story buildings, each a cell divided into two rooms by mesh grates. This division allows lawyers to consult with detainees in the area of their cells. Military officials also use the facilities to interrogate detainees, shackling them to the floor. The eight feet by ten feet (2.4 m by 3 m) concrete buildings have narrow, slotted translucent plastic in the doors but no real windows; they are air-conditioned and heated. The cell side contains a toilet and a cot. The visitor side contains a table and chairs.

Martin Mubanga, a British resident who was released without charges in January 2005 after being held for nearly three years, described being subjected to extremes of heat and cold during interrogation, which during one period happened on a daily basis. He and other former prisoners have described other abuses and torture at the hands of American interrogators.

Outside visitors to Camp Echo, such as attorneys for detainees, must pass through several guarded checkpoint gates. The camp is surrounded by high razor wire fences and is shrouded behind a thick green mesh. Walkways are drawn in the crushed white rock on the ground of the camp, and visitors are instructed to stay within these boundaries.

Camp Echo is under 24-hour guard by U.S. military police. Air patrol is provided by the Federal Air Marshals, and coastal protection is provided by the U.S. Coast Guard, both of which are part of the U.S. Department of Homeland Security.

Camp Delta is composed of detention camps 1, 2, 3, 4. Camp Echo is near it.

According to an article by Carol Rosenberg, published in The New York Times, on 17 September 2019, Camp Echo had been a CIA black site, until 2004.

== See also ==
- Camp Iguana
