= Inayatullah (Guantanamo detainee 10028) =

Afghan Guantanamo detainee

- Born: Hajji Nassim; 1974; Afghanistan
- Arrested: 2007; Iran
- Died: May 18, 2011 (aged 36–37); Guantanamo Bay detention camp
- Detained at: Guantanamo
- ISN: 10028
- Charge: No charge
- Status: Dead by apparent suicide

Inayatullah, (born Hajji Nassim, 1974–2011) was a citizen of Afghanistan who was arrested in 2007 and transferred that year to be held as an enemy combatant in the United States Guantanamo Bay detainment camps, in Cuba. His Guantanamo Internment Serial Number was 10028. Nassim was held in Guantanamo for 3 years, 8 months, and 22 days until his death in an apparent suicide. The US claims he admitted being an al Qaeda leader, but Nassim denied this in numerous interrogation sessions. The US military claims he was headquartered in Zahedan, Iran. Nassim was the 19th captive to have been transferred to Guantanamo since September 6, 2006.

Prior to the transfer on that date of fourteen high value detainees, who had previously been held elsewhere in secret detention centers run by the CIA, the USA had not transferred any captives to Guantanamo since the United States Supreme Court ruling in Rasul v. Bush (2004). The court had ruled that foreign nationals (non-US citizens) held in Guantanamo Bay had the right of habeas corpus in US courts to challenge their imprisonment. In late November 2008, the New York Times published a page summarizing the official documents related to each captive. The New York Times said that there were no further official records of his detention and only in March 2019 were his Combatant Status Review Tribunal findings published. They identified him as captive 10028 (not 10029, as published incorrectly elsewhere, including earlier versions of this Wikipedia page).

== Detention in Guantanamo ==
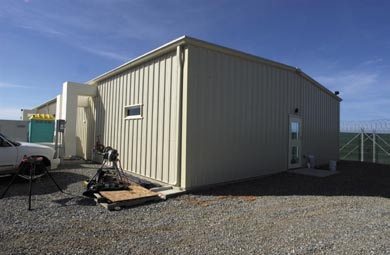
The detainee spent long periods of time in Guantanamo's Psychiatric Ward.

The detainee called Inayah was later identified as a native-born Afghani named Hajji Zaddy, according to his lawyer. He was arrested in an Iranian border town near Afghanistan in 2007. His attorney said he operated a cellphone store there. He was transferred after that date to Guantanamo, after having been held elsewhere by the US. He was among 19 persons transferred to the camp after September 6, 2006.

"Inayatullah met with local operatives, developed travel routes and coordinated documentation, accommodation and vehicles for smuggling unlawful combatants throughout countries including Afghanistan, Iran, Pakistan and Iraq." — US Department of Defense

On May 18, 2011, Inayatullah was found dead at approximately 3:50am in the small recreation "pen" outside his cell in Guantanamo's Camp Echo. The cause of his death was hanging, and the US military released a statement saying that he died in an "apparent suicide". He was the eighth prisoner to die at Guantanamo; five of the previous deaths were reported by the Department of Defense (DOD) as suicides. Three of these were contested as manslaughter in an award-winning article by Harper's Magazine in January 2010, based on accounts by four soldiers who had been serving at the camp at the time of the deaths in June 2006. At least one of the other deaths was highly suspicious, with the prisoner, Abdul Rahman Al Amri, found hanging from an air vent in his cell with his hands tied "snugly" behind his back.

On June 28, 2011, Carol Rosenberg, writing in the Miami Herald, reported that Pentagon spokesman Dave Oten confirmed that Inayatullah had been classed as an "indefinite detainee" by the Obama administration. "Indefinite detainee" was a new designation used by the joint interagency review boards which President Obama authorized for those captives who had not committed a crime for which they could face charges, but who were not considered safe to release.

Rosenberg quoted doubts expressed by the American Paul Rashkind, Inayatullah's attorney, about the DoD's account. Rashkind told Rosenberg that the man was named Hajji Nassim and that he was not known as "Inayatullah" anywhere other than at Guantanamo. He had not been an "emir". Rashkind confirmed that his client had been living in an Iranian border town near Afghanistan when he was arrested, where he had operated a cellphone store. He had no ties to al Qaeda, the Taliban, or terrorism.

Rashkind told Rosenberg that Nassim had a history of mental illness and had spent long periods in Guantanamo's Psychiatric Ward. He had brought a third-party specialist in to help treat his client, and the attorney had planned to have a psychiatric profile completed, believing that would have helped him be cleared by DOD for release. Rashkind confirmed that his client had made earlier suicide attempts, and he did not doubt that his death was suicide.

Declassified documents, including a U.S. Army report on Nassim's death, were released along with an article by Jeffrey Kaye at Medium.com, and lent a great deal of new material to understand Nassim's detention and death at Guantanamo. For instance, it was revealed that Nassim made two prior serious attempts at self-harm at Guantanamo before he died, including cutting his neck. He was psychiatrically hospitalized in Guantanamo's Behavioral Health Unit for 19 months, from March 2009 to October 2010.

Nassim expressed many times that he was worried that any cooperation he might offer the Americans would endanger him or his family back in Afghanistan. In fact, in March 2009 he was attacked by another detainee who accused him of being an American spy. For their part, interrogators seemed to never feel that Nassim was telling them the whole truth. But Nassim's attorney wrote in a filing with the government, criticizing “the coercive conditions of Mr. Nassim’s confinement and interrogation sessions,” citing specifically threats of beating, threats of imprisoning his family, sleep deprivation, and confinement in small, dark cells.

In an interview with defense-provided psychiatrist Emily Keram, MD on November 10, 2010, Naseem indicated that he cooperated with the Americans in interrogation back when he was first incarcerated at Bagram Detention Center in Afghanistan because of harsh, torturous treatment there, including sleep deprivation, confinement in a small, dark cell, and threats made against him and his family.

In June 2008, Nassim appeared somewhat reluctantly at his Combatant Status Review Tribunal. He told the government there, as a government report described it, that "he was innocent and the charges against him were baseless."

== Joint Review Task Force ==
When he assumed office in January 2009 President Barack Obama made a number of promises about the future of Guantanamo. He promised the use of torture would cease at the camp. He promised to institute a new review system. That new review system was composed of officials from six departments, where the OARDEC reviews were conducted entirely by the Department of Defense. When it reported back, a year later, the Joint Review Task Force classified some individuals as too dangerous to be transferred from Guantanamo, even though there was no evidence to justify laying charges against them. On April 9, 2013, that document was made public after a Freedom of Information Act request. Inayatullah was one of the 71 individuals deemed too innocent to charge, but too dangerous to release. Although Obama promised that those deemed too innocent to charge, but too dangerous to release would start to receive reviews from a Periodic Review Board less than a quarter of men have received a review.
