= Shane Kadidal =

American lawyer and writer

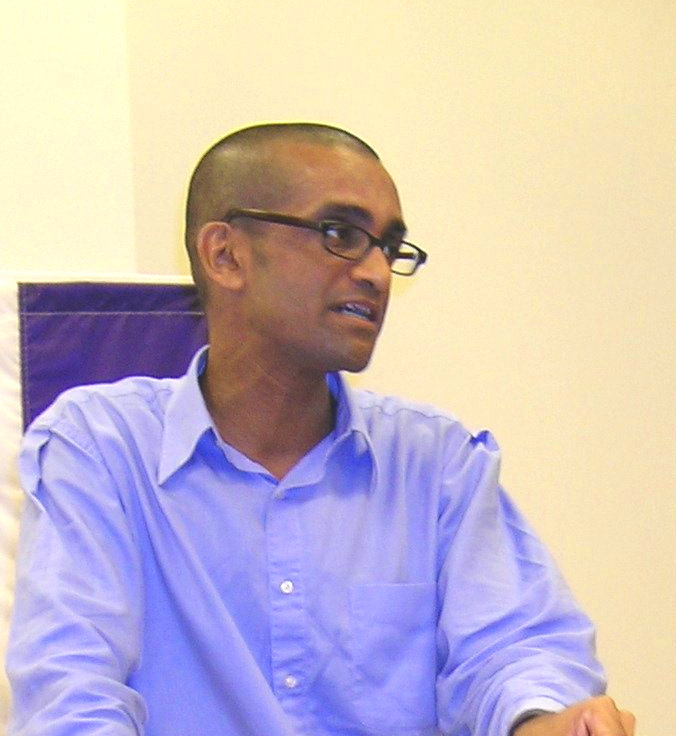
Shayana (Shane) D. Kadidal, American Lawyer and Author, speaks at a benefit for Lawyer and activist, Lynne Stewart at Judson Memorial Church, Washington Square South, Manhattan, NY, US. Photo July 11, 2005.

Shayana D. "Shane" Kadidal is an American lawyer and writer. Kadidal has worked at the Center for Constitutional Rights in New York City since 2001, and is senior managing attorney of the Guantánamo Global Justice Initiative there, coordinating legal representation for the captives held in extrajudicial detention in the United States' Guantanamo Bay detention camps, in Cuba. Previously a writer on patent, drug and obscenity law, since 2001 he has played a role in various notable human rights cases, including:

| CCR v. Bush | Challenging the wireless wiretaps of the lawyers who volunteered to aid Guantanamo captives. |
| Turkmen v. Ashcroft | Individuals suing the former Attorney General for how they were rounded up following al Qaeda's attack on September 11, 2001. |
| Vulcan Society of Black Firefighters | A discriminatory hiring case, in New York City. |
| Sikh Coalition | Opposing religious discrimination on the part of the New York Transit Authority. |

== Guantanamo clients ==
Kadidal has worked on behalf of a number of the captives held in extrajudicial detention in the United States' Guantanamo Bay detention camps, in Cuba. As Senior managing attorney of the Guantánamo project at the Center for Constitutional Rights, Kadidal has coordinated defense of Guantanamo detainees, spoken, written and been interviewed widely as an expert on the legal implications of these cases.

On January 8, 2007, the Center for Constitutional Rights published a list of the lead petitioner's counsel in the Guantanamo habeas cases. Kadidal was listed as the counsel for Murat Kurnaz and Moazzam Begg.

On July 18, 2008, Shayana D. Kadidal of the Center for Constitutional Rights filed a status report on Al Halmandy v. Bush No. 05-CV-2385 (RMU) on behalf of seven Guantanamo captives Kadidal wrote that of the 63 captives initially listed in the petition, all but those seven had either been repatriated, or were named in other petitions.

== Wilner v. NSA ==
Kadidal represents 23 attorneys for Guantanamo detainees who believe they had been subjected to a warrantless wiretap. The 23 suspect they had been the target of surveillance because they volunteered to assist Guantanamo captives. They filed a Freedom of Information Act request, Wilner v. NSA, for the National Security Agency's records of their wiretaps.

As part of the FOIA request Kadidal wrote:

One of the striking things about this program is that it means opposing counsel – particularly the DOJ – may be listening in on our litigation strategy. The uncertainty created by the existence of the NSA program makes it far more difficult for lawyers to challenge in court all the other illegal behavior of this administration in the course of the so-called War on Terror. Today's filing is an attempt to determine whether all the warning signs of government surveillance are real or just false alarms.

== Other work ==
After graduating from Yale Law in 1994, Kadidal worked in a number of areas before becoming involved in civil liberties law. He wrote on plant patenting issues, including on the role of Western corporations in patenting the products of the Neem tree. He also published academic works on drug laws and on the role of technology in United States Obscenity Law.

Since he began work at the Center for Constitutional Rights in 2001 Kadidal has taken part in or led litigation in government detention, wiretapping, electoral, and job and religious discrimination cases. These include defending Farouk Abdel-Muhti, a New York journalist at New York's WBAI radio and stateless national detained indefinitely after the September 11 terrorist attacks; bringing suit against the FDNY for discrimination on behalf of members of the African American firefighters group, the Vulcan Society, which was further expanded to include women and Hispanic firefighters; litigating against the NSA for accused wiretapping of lawyers; litigating a suit against the "Material Support" segments of the Patriot Act, specifically in its restriction of fundraising for medical clinics in parts of Sri Lanka occupied by the Liberation Tigers of Tamil Eelam (LTTE); litigating and organizing litigation of three 2005 cases against United States government travel restrictions to Cuba; and arguing in a suit on behalf of a United States Sikh rights group alleging religious discrimination of employees by New York Transit Authority. He was awarded the 2009 Access To Justice Award by the South Asian Bar Association of New York.

== Publications ==
Kadidal has written for a variety of publications, including The Guardian, The Jurist and Huffington Post. He is the coauthor of the book Articles of Impeachment Against George W. Bush.
