= Ahmed Zaid Salim Zuhair =

Saudi former Guantanamo Bay detainee (born 1965)

- Born: 1965 (age 60–61); Jeddah, Saudi Arabia
- Released: 2009-06-12; Saudi Arabia
- Citizenship: Saudi Arabia
- Detained at: Guantanamo
- ISN: 669
- Status: Repatriated

Ahmed Zaid Salim Zuhair (born 1965) is a citizen of Saudi Arabia formerly held in extrajudicial detention in the United States's Guantanamo Bay detention camps, in Cuba.

On August 13, 2008, it was reported that Ahmed Zaid Zuhair had been on a hunger strike since June 2005. Two other long-term hunger strikers died at the detention camp in June 2006 under mysterious circumstances.

On March 18, 2009, camp authorities declined to agree to moving Zuhair to Camp 4 from Camp 6 in exchange for his ending his hunger strike.

In December 2008, an Administrative Review Board cleared Zuhair for release from Guantanamo. On May 22, 2009, Zuhair was cleared for transfer once again by the Inter-Agency Review process established by President Obama. He was repatriated to Saudi Arabia on June 12, 2009.

== Habeas corpus petition ==
Carol Rosenberg, writing in the Miami Herald, reported that Zuhair's June 12, 2009, repatriation came shortly before the Department of Justice would be called upon to defend his continued detention during consideration of his habeas corpus petition.

Zuhair's lawyers have filed an extensive refutation of the government's allegations in court. They argue that the allegations against Zuhair are baseless:

The Government rests its case against Mr. Zuhair mainly upon two types of evidence: raw intelligence that lacks any indicia of reliability and statements extracted under torture that are not only inherently unreliable but so repugnant to Constitutional protections of dignity and fairness as to require them to be struck. As a matter of law, this Court can accord neither sort of evidence any persuasive weight.

Zuhair's lawyers point out that the type of intelligence document extensively relied upon to justify his detention almost always carry the legend "WARNING: INFORMATION REPORT, NOT FINALLY EVALUATED INTELLIGENCE" and are used to circulate possible leads, rather than verified information.

Although most of the tortured-based evidence in the case remained classified, Zuhair's attorneys also produced an unclassified declaration from Sa'd Iqbal Madani, a victim of rendition and torture in Egypt and Afghanistan. In it, Madani described how, in order to avoid further mistreatment, he made false statements at Bagram that interrogators used to link Zuhair to the Cole bombing. Other detainees who were held at Bagram, including Mamdouh Habib and Moazzam Begg, also attested to the torture that Madani experienced.

Zuhair's attorneys also attacked the government's allegations directly. Most importantly they demonstrate that despite investigations of the murder of William Jefferson by Bosnian police, the United Nations, and the FBI, Zuhair was never charged as a suspect. Moreover, Bosnian authorities issued an arrest warrant for another man, Fa'iz al-Shanbari, for the murder in 1998. A comprehensive 200-page investigation by the UN did not even mention Zuhair. Zuhair's attorneys conclude:

It has been thirteen years since William Jefferson was murdered, in a country U.S. investigators would have had no problems accessing, and Ahmed Zuhair has spent over half of that time in American custody. Under such circumstances, the lack of an indictment against Mr. Zuhair for this crime from either jurisdiction should speak for itself.

== Hunger strike ==
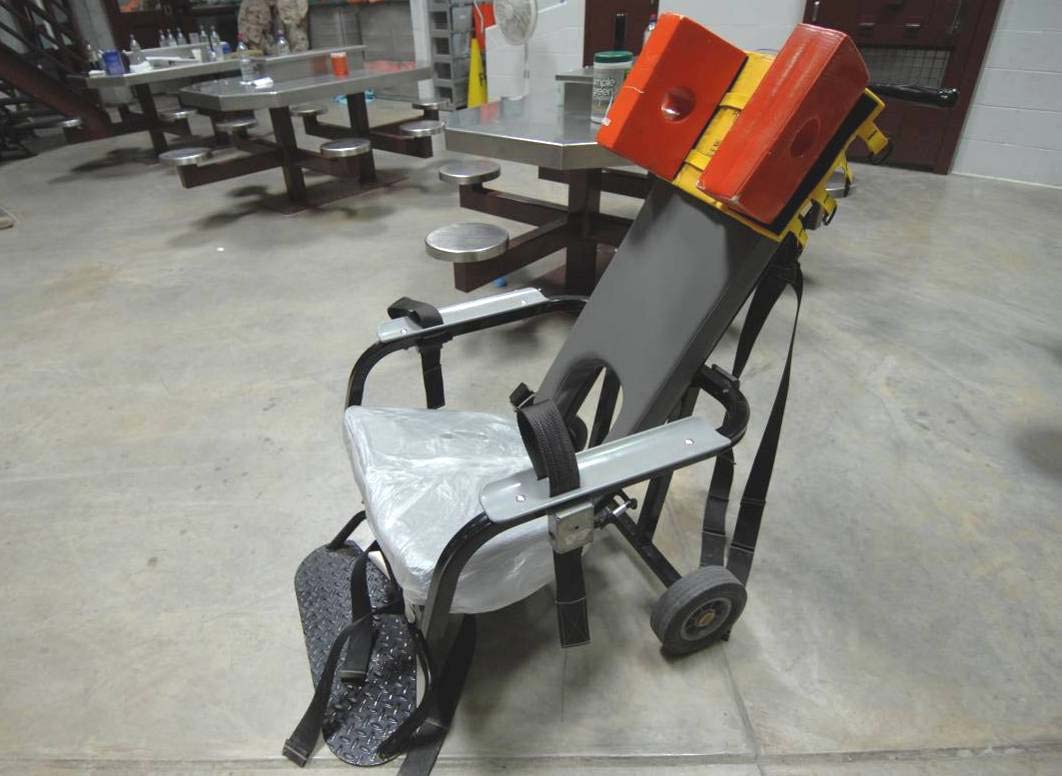
Long term hunger strikers are immobilized in "restraint chairs" for twice daily force-feedings. The immobilizations last for several hours, so captives can't vomit their nutrient.

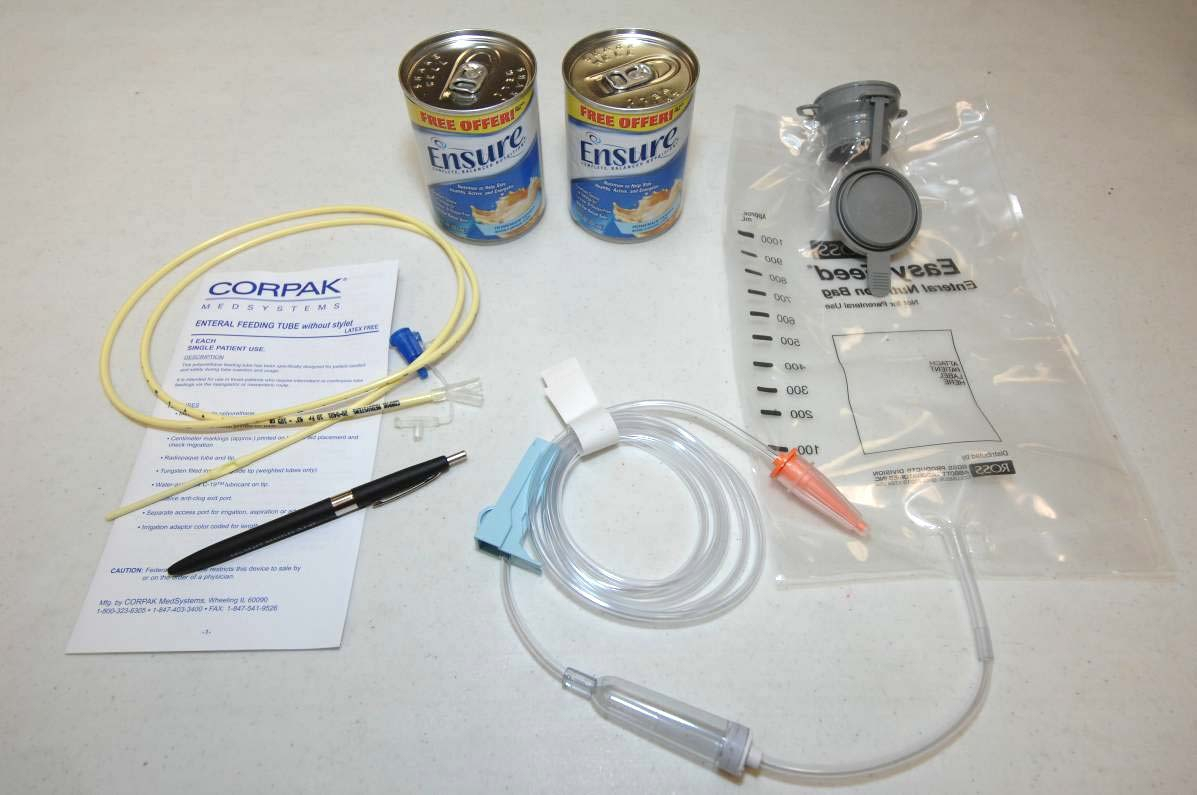
A Guantanamo force-feeding kit.

In May 2008, the Gulf News reported that Zuhair and Abdul Rahman Shalabi are the two remaining captives who have been on the hunger strike that started in August 2005.

On October 25, 2008, the Associated Press reported that new documents, documenting Guantanamo guards' struggles to force-feed Zuhair, had recently been filed in court. According to the report:

...according to court documents reviewed by The Associated Press, guards have struggled with him repeatedly, at least once using pepper spray, shackles and brute force to drag him to a restraint chair for his twice-daily dose of a liquid nutrition mix force-fed through his nose.

Joint Task Force Guantanamo guard force commander Colonel Bruce Vargo offering the justification for the use of force, stated:

ISN 669 has a very long history of disciplinary violations and noncompliant, resistant and combative behavior.

According to an affidavit filed by Ramzi Kassem, one of his attorneys, official records document that between August and October Zuhair lost over 16 kilograms, dropping to under 45 kilograms. Kassem's affidavit stated that when he last visited Zuhair, in mid November, he kept vomiting uncontrollably, because he was allergic to the liquid food substitute used during his force-feedings.

Mr. Zuhair lifted his orange shirt and showed me his chest. It was skeletal. Mr. Zuhair's legs looked like bones with skin wrapped tight around them.

Pauline Storum, a Joint Task Force Guantanamo spokesmen, stated that camp authorities monitored the captives' health closely.

US District Court Judge Emmet Sullivan ordered an independent medical examination for Zuhair.

On March 17, 2009, Ben Fox, writing for the Associated Press quoted a court statement filed by Colonel Bruce Vargo, commander of the camp's guard force, who explained that camp authorities could not agree to move Zuhair to the Camp 4, due to his history of infractions of the camp rules. He stated it would set a bad precedent, and that other captives held in camp 6 might follow his example, so that they too could be moved to camp 4.

Vargo's statement acknowledged that the camp's riot squad was routinely called upon to extract Zuhair from his cell for his twice-daily force-feedings. His statement said Zuhair had committed 80 infractions of the camp rules in the last four months.

Vargo stated that Zuhair currently weighed 114 pounds, down from 137 pounds in August 2008.

After his repatriation to Saudi Arabia on June 12, 2009, Carol Rosenberg, writing in the Miami Herald, reported that Zuhair had been the longest lasting hunger striker, whose hunger strike had lasted 1450 days.

== Death threats ==
Zuhair wrote a letter to his attorneys on July 18, 2008, stating that Guantanamo guards had searched his cell, confiscated some of his correspondence with his attorneys, and threatened to kill him if he did not drop his habeas petition. Judge Emmet G. Sullivan ordered the guards involved to submit sworn declarations to the court detailing their responses to the allegations, the first time a judge had done so in a Guantanamo-related case.

== Repatriation ==
Zuhair and two other Saudis, Abdelaziz Kareem Salim al-Noofayee and Khalid Saad Mohammed, were repatriated to Saudi Arabia on June 12, 2009.

Fox News reported that Zuhair: "had been implicated in the murder of an American."

Saudi security officials have stated that the three men were allowed to meet with their families, shortly after their repatriation. Security officials said the three men were then taken to an undisclosed location for interrogation. The three men would go through the same Saudi jihadist rehabilitation program as other repatriated captives, even though some former captives have back-slid to supporting jihadism following their release.

== Admission of insufficient evidence ==
Unclassified traverse filed by attorneys of ex-Guantanamo detainee Ahmed Zuhair refuting the unclassified allegations against him.

During a hearing of the Senate Judiciary Committee on June 17, 2009, Attorney General Eric Holder publicly admitted that Zuhair had been cleared for transfer from Guantanamo by both administrations because "there was no sufficient proof to bring a case" against him.

== See also ==
- Hunger strike
