= Adnan Farhan Abd Al Latif =

Yemeni Guantanamo Bay detainee

Adnan Farhan Abdul Latif
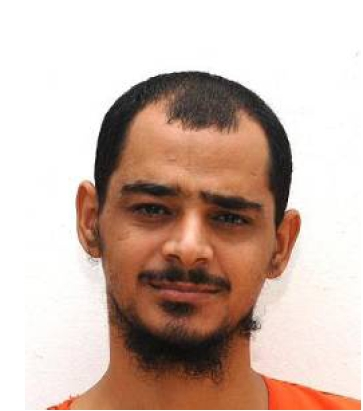
- Undated photo of Adnan Latif used by JTF-GTMO in 2008
- Born: 1981; Al Udayn District, North Yemen
- Died: September 8, 2012 (aged 30–31); Guantánamo Bay, Cuba
- Detained at: Guantanamo
- Other names: Agnahn Purhan Abjallil; Allal, Ab Aljallil; Allal Ab Aljallil Abd Al Rahman Abd; Abdelrahman Abdulla Abdel Galil; Adnan Farhan Abd al Latif; Afnahn Purhan Abjillil; Adnan Farhan Abdul Latif
- ISN: 156
- Charge: No charge extrajudicial detention
- Status: death in custody
- Spouse: married
- Children: married, with children

Adnan Farhan Abdul Latif (1981 – September 8, 2012), also known as Allal Ab Aljallil Abd al Rahman, was a Yemeni citizen imprisoned at the U.S. military prison at Guantanamo Bay, Cuba, from January 2002 until his death in custody there, ruled as suicide.

== Capture and detention ==
According to Marjorie Cohn, Adnan Latif was involved in a car accident in 1994, during which he suffered significant head injuries, which left him with on-going neurological problems. Latif said he traveled from Yemen to Pakistan in August 2001 to seek medical treatment, while the U.S. government alleged he went there to receive military training from affiliates of al Qaeda. He was captured in December 2001 at the Pakistan/Afghanistan border in a widespread dragnet of Arabs, and brought to Guantanamo prison in January 2002.

== Judicial and quasi-judicial proceedings ==
Immediately after his imprisonment, Latif and Guantanamo prisoners generally were blocked from filing habeas corpus petitions because of President George W. Bush's doctrine that "war on terror" detainees were not covered by the Geneva Conventions, and so could be held indefinitely without charge and without an open and transparent review of the justifications for their detention. In June 2004, however, the United States Supreme Court ruled, in Rasul v. Bush, that Guantanamo captives had basic habeas corpus rights, to be informed of and allowed to attempt to refute the allegations justifying their detention.

Latif attorneys Marc D. Falkoff and David Remes filed a habeas corpus petition on his behalf in 2004.

Following the Supreme Court Rasul ruling, in July 2004 the Department of Defense set up its Combatant Status Review Tribunals (CSRT). Scholars at the Brookings Institution, led by Benjamin Wittes, would later, in 2008, list detainees still held in Guantanamo, and the CSRT allegations against them. The allegations were as follows regarding Adnan Latif: the military alleged he was an al Qaeda fighter and operative, that he went to Afghanistan for jihad, that he "... took military or terrorist training in Afghanistan," and that he ".. fought for the Taliban." Further allegations were that his name or alias had been found "on material seized in raids on Al Qaeda safehouses and facilities," and that he served on the security detail of Osama bin Laden. Annual CSRT status review hearings were held in 2004, 2005, 2006, and 2007, and there is evidence Latif attended his 2004, 2005, and 2007 hearings.

Late in 2005, Guantanamo detainee habeas corpus rights were again restricted and largely replaced with a much more limited review known as "DTA appeal," after the United States Congress passage of the Detainee Treatment Act of 2005 and the Military Commissions Act of 2006. However, in June 2008, the United States Supreme Court overturned provisions of those laws and restored detainee access to habeas corpus.

Responding to Latif's habeas corpus petition in July 2010, District Court judge Henry Kennedy ordered Latif's release from detention. His ruling stated that the government had failed to show by a preponderance of evidence that he was part of al Qaeda or an affiliated force. Latif attorney Remes said, "This is a mentally disturbed man who has said from the beginning that he went to Afghanistan seeking medical care because he was too poor to pay for it. Finally, a court has recognized that he's been telling the truth, and ordered his release."

The decision was, however, appealed and a three-judge DC Circuit Court of Appeals panel over-turned the ruling in an October 14, 2011, split decision which granted government allegations stronger credibility. The Supreme Court decided not to review the appeals court decision.

== Life at Guantanamo ==
Latif and other prisoners described Guantanamo conditions to Latif's attorney Falkoff when he and other U.S. attorneys were first allowed to visit them in November 2004: "During the three years in which they had been held in total isolation, they had been subjected repeatedly to stress positions, sleep deprivation, blaring music, and extremes of heat and cold during endless interrogations." Latif also described to Lakoff a visit to his cell by an 'Immediate Reaction Force" team:

A half-dozen soldiers in body armor, carrying shields and batons, had forcibly extracted him from his cell. His offense: stepping over a line, painted on the floor of his cell, while his lunch was being passed through the food slot of his door. "Suddenly the riot police came," he recounted. "No one in the cellblock knew who for. They closed all the windows except mine. A female soldier came in with a big can of pepper spray. Eventually I figured out they were coming for me. She sprayed me. I couldn’t breathe. I fell down. I put a mattress over my head. I thought I was dying. They opened the door. I was lying on the bed but they were kicking and hitting me with the shields. They put my head in the toilet. They put me on a stretcher and carried me away."

Latif became a frequent hunger striker, and described being force fed as "like having a dagger shoved down your throat." The Miami Herald writes that at times Latif "would smear his excrement on himself, throw blood at his lawyers, and on at least one occasion was brought to meet his lawyer clad only in a padded green garment called an 'anti-suicide smock' held together by Velcro."

In 2008, Latif's attorney Remes filed an emergency federal court motion stating that Latif was suffering seizures and was not being properly treated. The motion, which requested Latif's medical records, a pillow, and an additional blanket, was denied. Falkoff recalled, "he was the guy that we tried unsuccessfully to get medical records for, and a blanket, and mattress, after we found him lying on the floor of our interview cell, weak and emaciated."

In a letter described in an April 17, 2009, Al Jazeera report, Latif stated he had recently been abused at Guantanamo. The report also quoted attorney David Remes' observations on the appearance of Abdul Latif and his other clients: "Adnan Latif ... has a badly dislocated shoulder blade. I've seen the evidence of physical torture and I've also heard about the evidence of psychological torture."

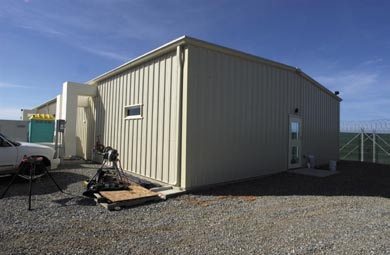
Guantanamo's Psychiatric ward, where Latif was reported to have been confined.

The Associated Press reported on May 11, 2009, that Remes said that Latif had slit his wrists during his most recent visit. Remes said that Latif had used the edge of a strip of broken veneer from the side of a table in the interview room to sever a vein in his wrist, and used the interview table to hide his bleeding wrist from others and the room's video camera. Remes stated that Latif had tried to commit suicide before, and therefore had at times been confined to the prison's psychiatric facility. Remes also said Latif needed mental health care, but all camp authorities were doing was attempting to keep him subdued.

A December 10, 2012, article at Truthout reported that Latif had written a letter to Remes complaining of his treatment at Guantanamo. Dated May 28, 2010, Latif complained in the letter that guards were placing contraband items, such as scissors, in his cell. "The way they deal with me proves to me that they want to get rid of me, but in a way that they cannot be accused of causing it," he told his attorney. The same article reports that on two separate instances in 2010, camp officials tried to get Latif to fire Remes. On one of these occasions, he was given an injection with an unspecified drug before a meeting with a military lawyer. Latif told Remes later (according to attorney notes, as described in the Truthout article) that "they wanted to have no one report" his death.

== Clearances for release ==
On April 25, 2011, whistleblower organization WikiLeaks published formerly secret assessments drafted by Joint Task Force Guantanamo analysts. Latif's nine page long assessment was drafted on January 17, 2008, and signed by camp commandant Mark Buzby, and it recommended that he be transferred out of Department of Defense control. Historian Andy Worthington, the author of The Guantanamo Files, writes that the 2008 assessment repeated earlier recommendations that Latif be released. Worthington reported that in addition to being cleared for release by Joint Task Force Guantanamo, and by the US District Court Judge Henry Kennedy, Latif had been cleared for release by the Guantánamo Review Task Force that President Barack Obama had set up when he came to office in 2009.

== Death ==
On September 10, 2012, Latif died at Guantanamo. He had been held there for 10 years, 7 months and 25 days, after arriving there on January 17, 2002. On September 10, camp authorities informed the press that a detainee held in the punishment cells of Camp Five had been found dead early in the afternoon of September 10, but did not reveal the detainee's name, and stated that the cause of death was not apparent. The next day it was acknowledged the prisoner was Adnan Latif, and later a military autopsy reportedly declared suicide as the cause of death. The results of a full Naval Criminal Investigative Service investigation were not expected to be known until sometime in 2013.

Before the publication of Latif's identity, Wells Dixon, a lawyer who helped several Guantanamo detainees with their habeas corpus petitions, described the captives' feelings of despair, which he attributed to recent judicial reverses.

== See also ==
- Poems From Guantánamo
- Guantanamo suicide attempts
- Guantanamo force feeding
