= Initial reaction force =

Type of anti-riot unit in prisons

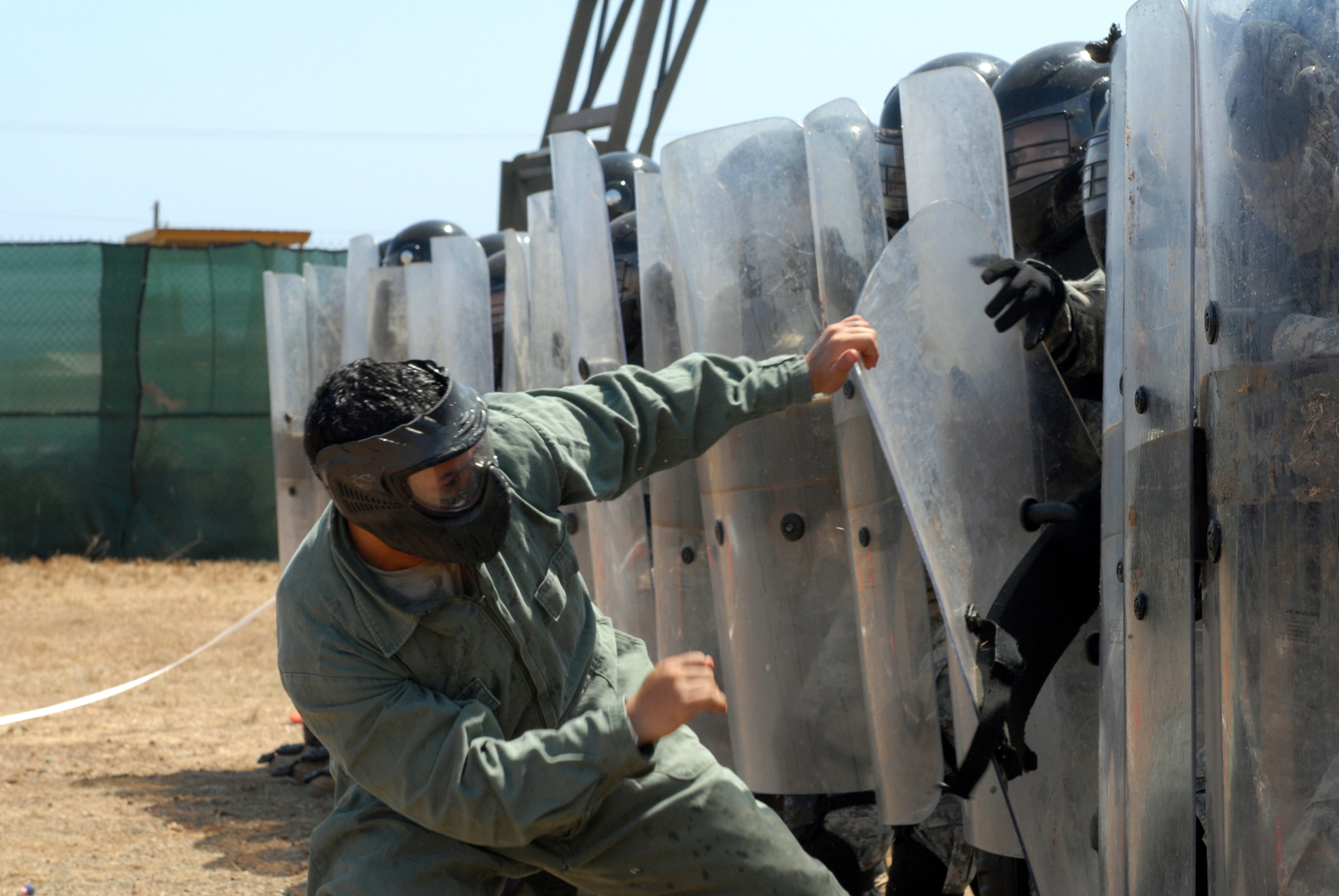
Outside Guantanamo riot squad training

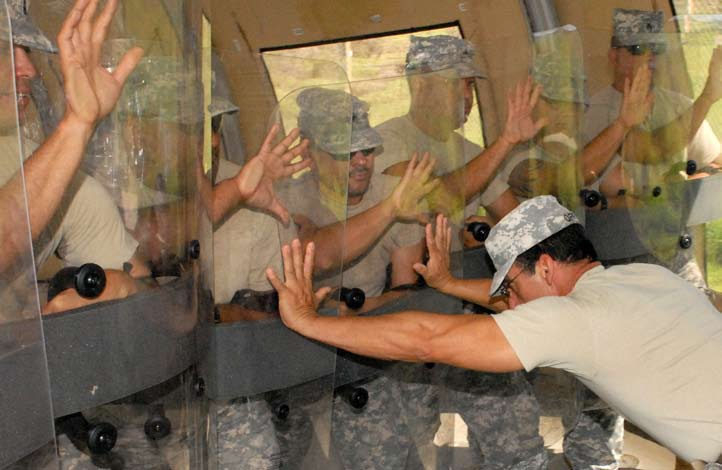
Indoors Guantanamo riot squad training

An initial reaction force (IRF), also known as an internal reaction force, or extreme reaction force (ERF) to inmates, is a type of small-scale riot squad in U.S. military prisons such as the Camp Delta detention center of Guantanamo Bay. A squad is suited up and ready to respond, at all times, in instances when one or more detainees are combative or resistive.

== Controversy ==
It is alleged by detainees that the units also act as a punishment squad for detainees whose level of insubordination does not fit the criteria for IRF deployment. Part of the allegations charge that regular guards will create reasons to call on the IRF to brutalize detainees over petty or non-existent infractions; refusing to agree to the third cell search in a day or infractions as slight as placing their toiletries on their shelf in the wrong order. claims: "16. I have witnessed the activities of the Internal Reaction Force (hereinafter "IRF"), which consists of a squad of soldiers that enter a detainee's cell and brutalize him with the aid of an attack dog. The IRF invasions were so common that the term to be "IRF'd" became part of the language of the detainees. I have seen detainees suffer serious injuries as a result of being IRF'ed. I have seen detainees IRF'ed while they were praying, or for refusing medication."

Another allegation by ex-detainees is that while the IRF squad is en route to the target detainee's cell they will chant, "IRF! IRF! IRF!" in order to intimidate and terrify the detainee. Part of the allegation claims that, when the squad arrives at a detainee's cell, they shout out demands to comply.

In his first interview, after his repatriation, Tarek Dergoul asserted that a sixth member of the ERF team always stood outside the cell, with a video camera, recording the action. Camp authorities confirmed every ERF action was filmed, and Senator Patrick Leahy called for the recordings to be made available to the Senate Judiciary Committee, to see if they contained instances of the kind of abuse recorded in the Abu Ghraib trophy photos. Camp Commandant Jay Hood appeared before the committee two months later with a selection of recordings of the use of the ERF squad.

== See also ==
- Correctional emergency response team
- Omar Deghayes
