= Camp Delta (Guantanamo Bay) =

Detainment camp of Guantanamo Bay

Coordinates: 19°54′09″N 75°05′57″W

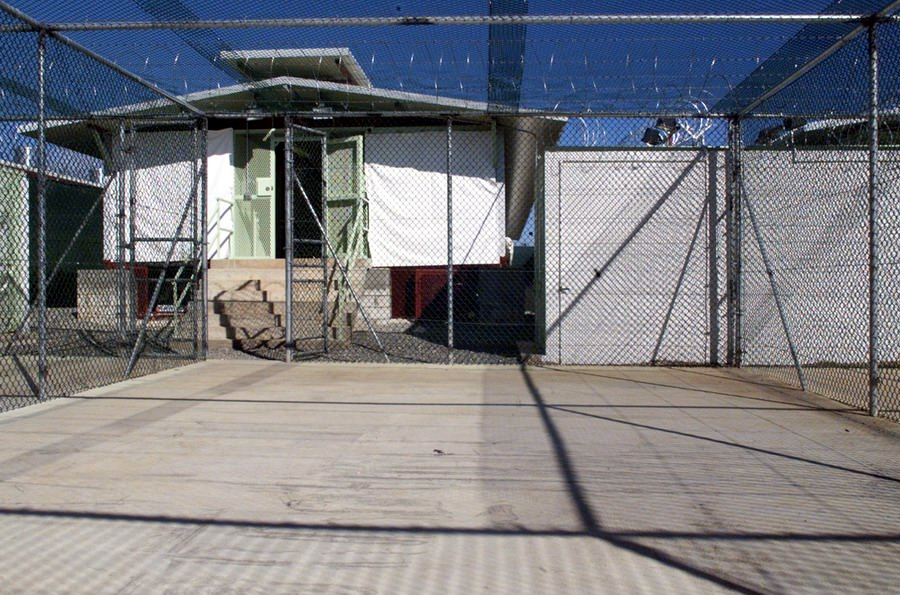
A Camp Delta recreation and exercise area at Guantanamo Bay. The detention block is shown with sunshades drawn on 3 December 2002.

Camp Delta is a permanent American detainment camp at Guantanamo Bay that replaced the temporary facilities of Camp X-Ray. Its first facilities were built between 27 February and mid-April 2002 by Navy Seabees, Marine Engineers, and workers from Halliburton subsidiary Kellogg, Brown and Root. It is composed of detention camps 1 through 6, Camp Platinum, Camp Iguana, the Guantanamo psychiatric ward, Camp Echo and Camp No. The prisoners, referred to as detainees, have uncertain rights due to their location not on American soil. There are allegations of torture and abuse of prisoners (§ Prisoner torture).

Most of the security forces are U.S. Army Military Police and U.S. Navy Masters-at-Arms.

The camps have different amenities and levels of comfort. Detainees are quartered in different parts of Camp Delta according to their level of cooperation with guards and interrogators, with the exception of newly arriving detainees who always go to maximum security in Camp 3. Thereafter, cooperative detainees are moved to Camp 2 and then Camp 1 as rewards for cooperation. When detainees cooperate and are thought to show no security risk they can be moved to the buildings of Camp 4, which have a shower and lavatory, plus four communal living rooms for 10 detainees each. In Camp 4, each detainee has a bed and a locker. Camp 4 detainees may eat their meals together, instead of alone in their own cells as in the other camps, and Camp 4 detainees are set apart by their white jump suits, in contrast to the orange worn by detainees in other camps. In addition to these benefits, detainees are also allowed special meal supplements to their diets, along with longer shower periods and longer exercise periods.

== Camp one ==
Camp one is one of the camps where the United States held detainees classified as "enemy combatants in extrajudicial detention". Although the camp was reported to have been closed, Human Rights Watch reported in June 2008 that it currently houses non-compliant detainees. At that time they said the camp held 25 detainees in adjacent cells.

== Camp three ==
Camp three is one of the camps that held detainees classified as "enemy combatants in extrajudicial detention".

Although the camp was closed in 2006, Human Rights Watch reported in June 2008 that it was then used to house half a dozen non-compliant detainees who had to be housed in isolation. The detainees' cells were sufficiently isolated from one another that they could not see one another.

== Camp four ==
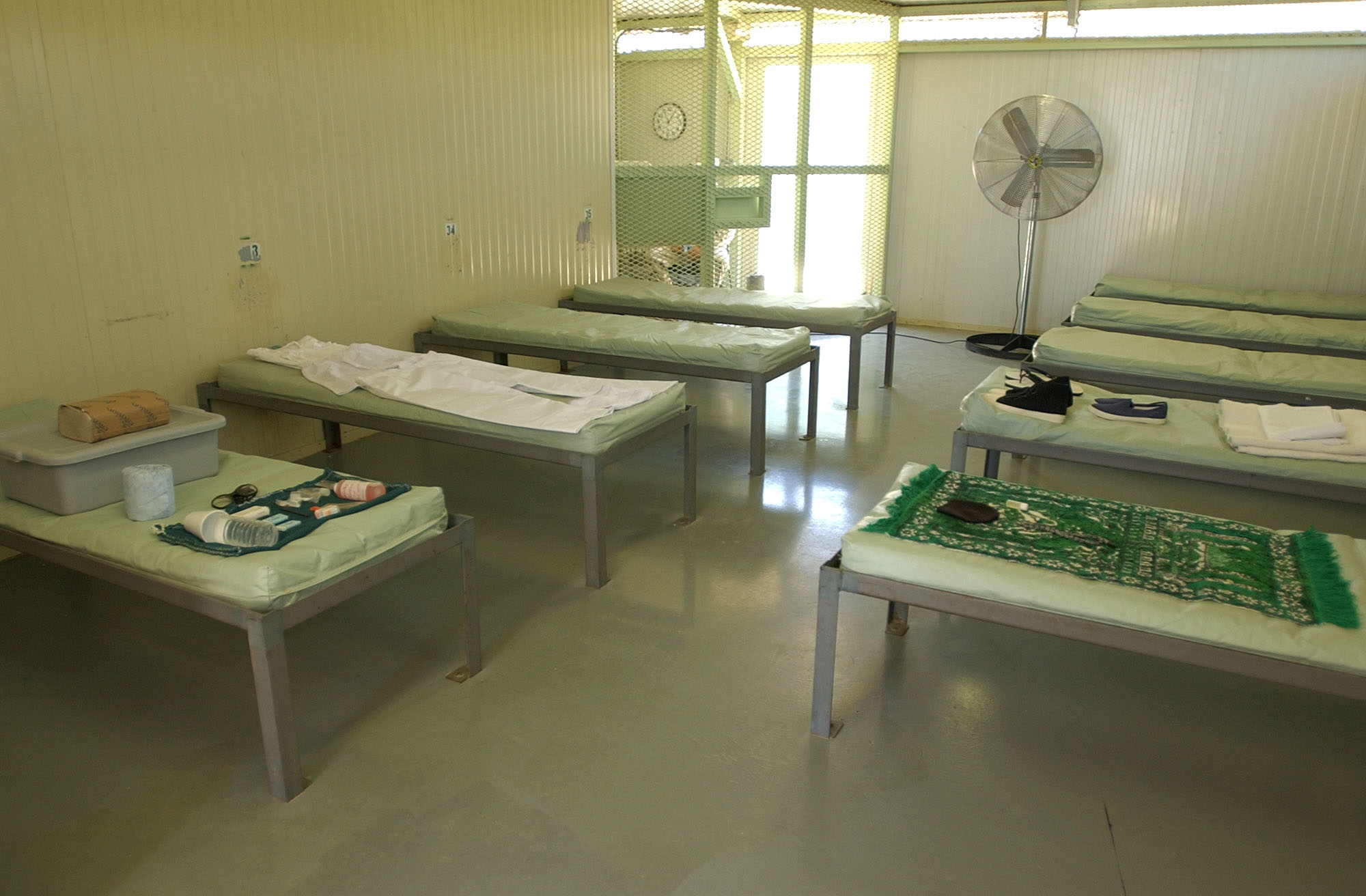
Photo taken by the US military shows one of the Camp Four barracks, May 2006 according to the US military

Camp four is the camp that most closely resembles a traditional prisoner of war camp. Captives held there live in communal dormitories, and have day long access to communal exercise yard, games, and books.

Camp authorities only allow the captives they considered "compliant" to stay in camp four and they are allowed to wear white or tan uniforms which distinguish them from the orange uniforms "non-compliant" captives wear.

== Camp five ==
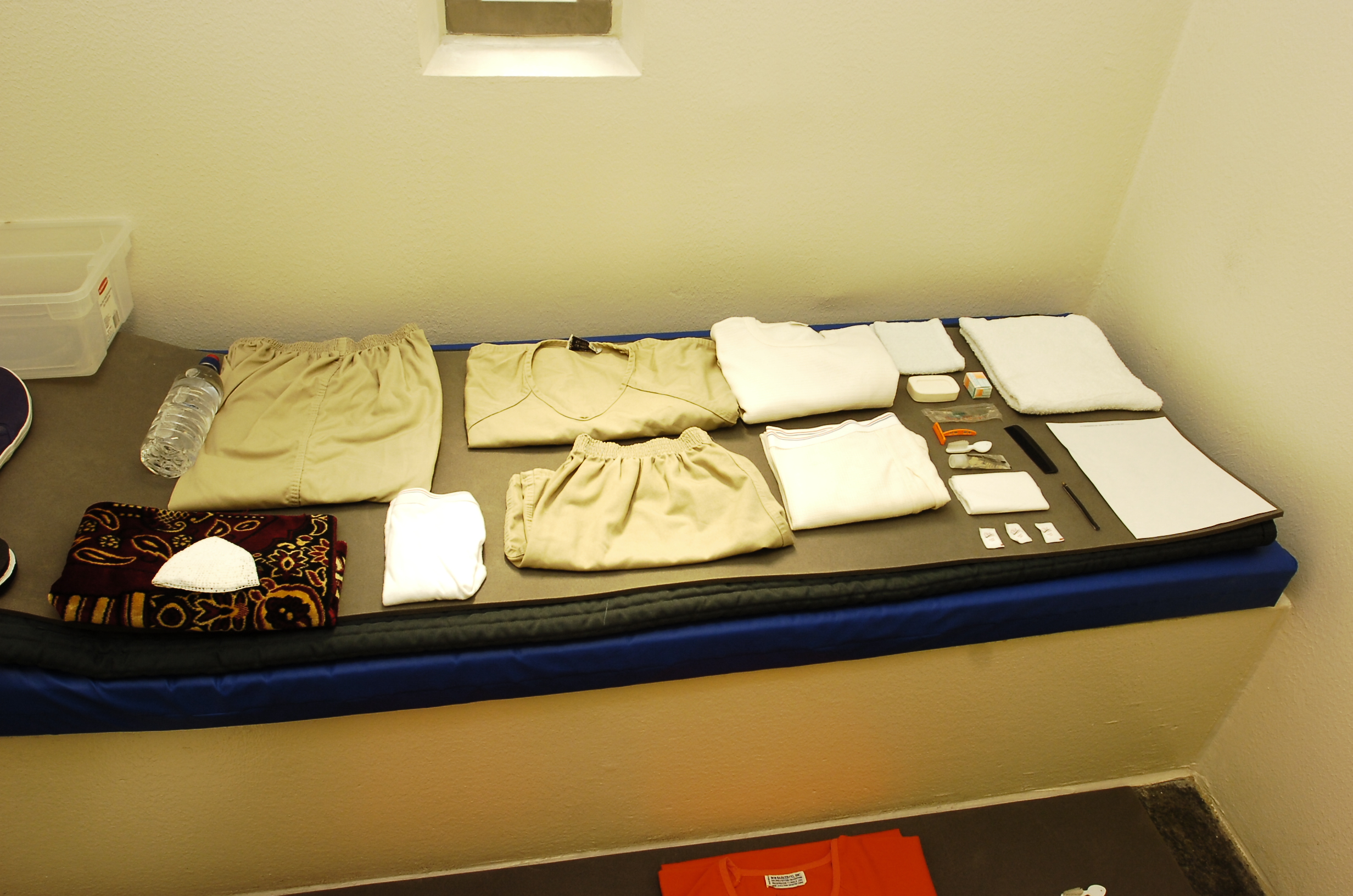
A camp five cell

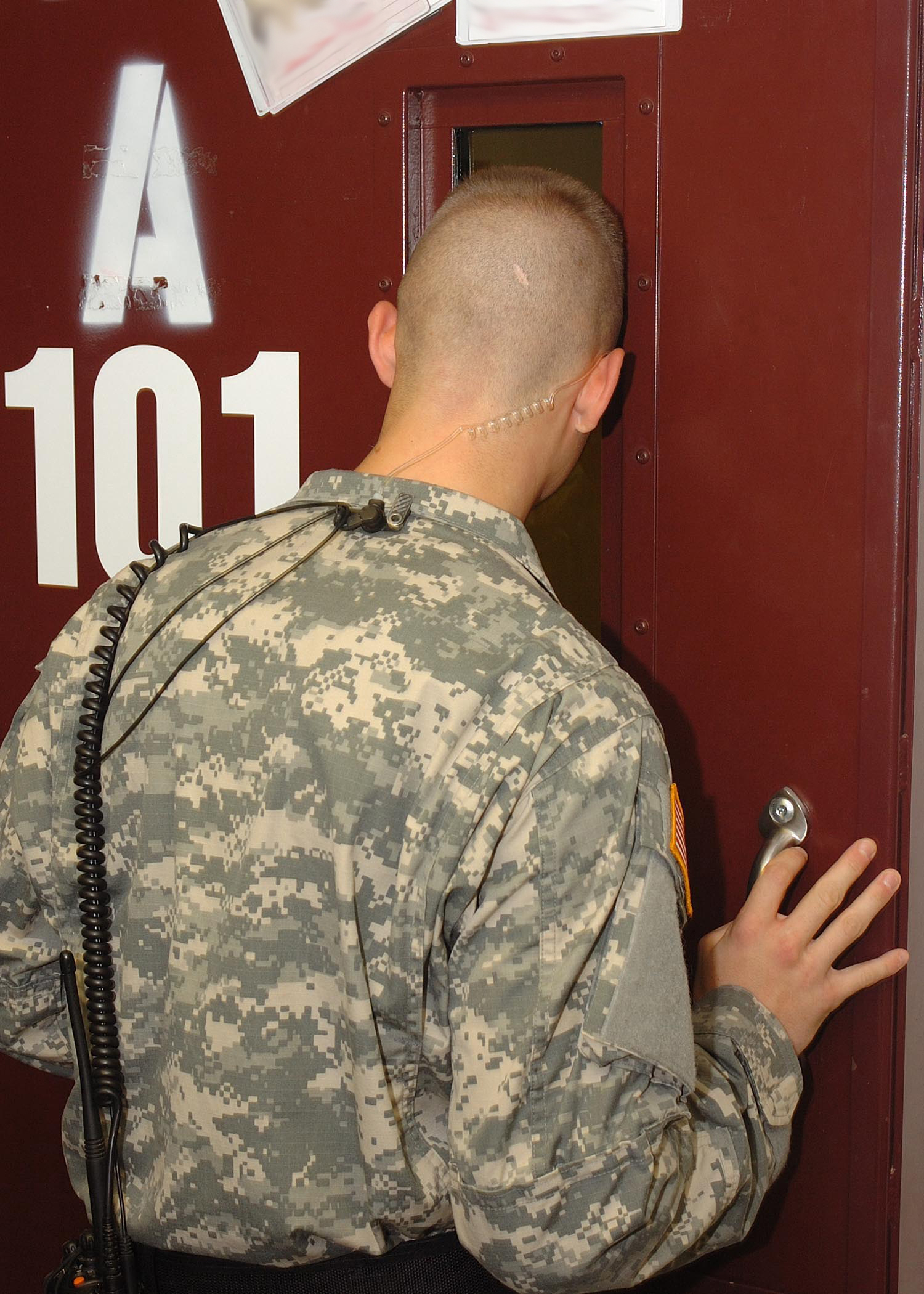
GIs inspect every detainee every three minutes.

According to Commander Jeff Hayhurst, deputy commander of the Guard force, "...the camp opened in 2004, cost $17.5 million. It's modeled on a max security facility in Terre Haute, Indiana." The camp was built by Kellogg, Brown and Root. Hayhurst said that the camp was used to hold the most non-compliant detainees.

In September 2006, National Public Radio reported that the camp could hold 100 detainees, and was about half full.

Initially the press was told the fourteen "high value detainees" transferred from CIA custody on 5 September 2006 were held in Camp five. But they were in fact held in a small, secret, ultra high security facility – Camp seven.

The Department of Defense reports that Mohammad Ahmed Abdullah Saleh Al Hanashi committed suicide in camp five on 1 June 2009.

== Camp Five Echo ==
Camp Five Echo is a "disciplinary block" for "non-compliant" prisoners. Lawyers claim that the cells are too small to be regarded as humane, that the toilets are inadequate, the lights are too bright and the air in the cells is foul. The cells are only half the size of the cells in Camp Five and have squat toilets in the floor instead of standard prison toilets. David Remes described Camp Five Echo in 2011 as violating the Geneva Conventions, and called it "a throwback to the bad old days at Guantánamo."

== Camp six ==
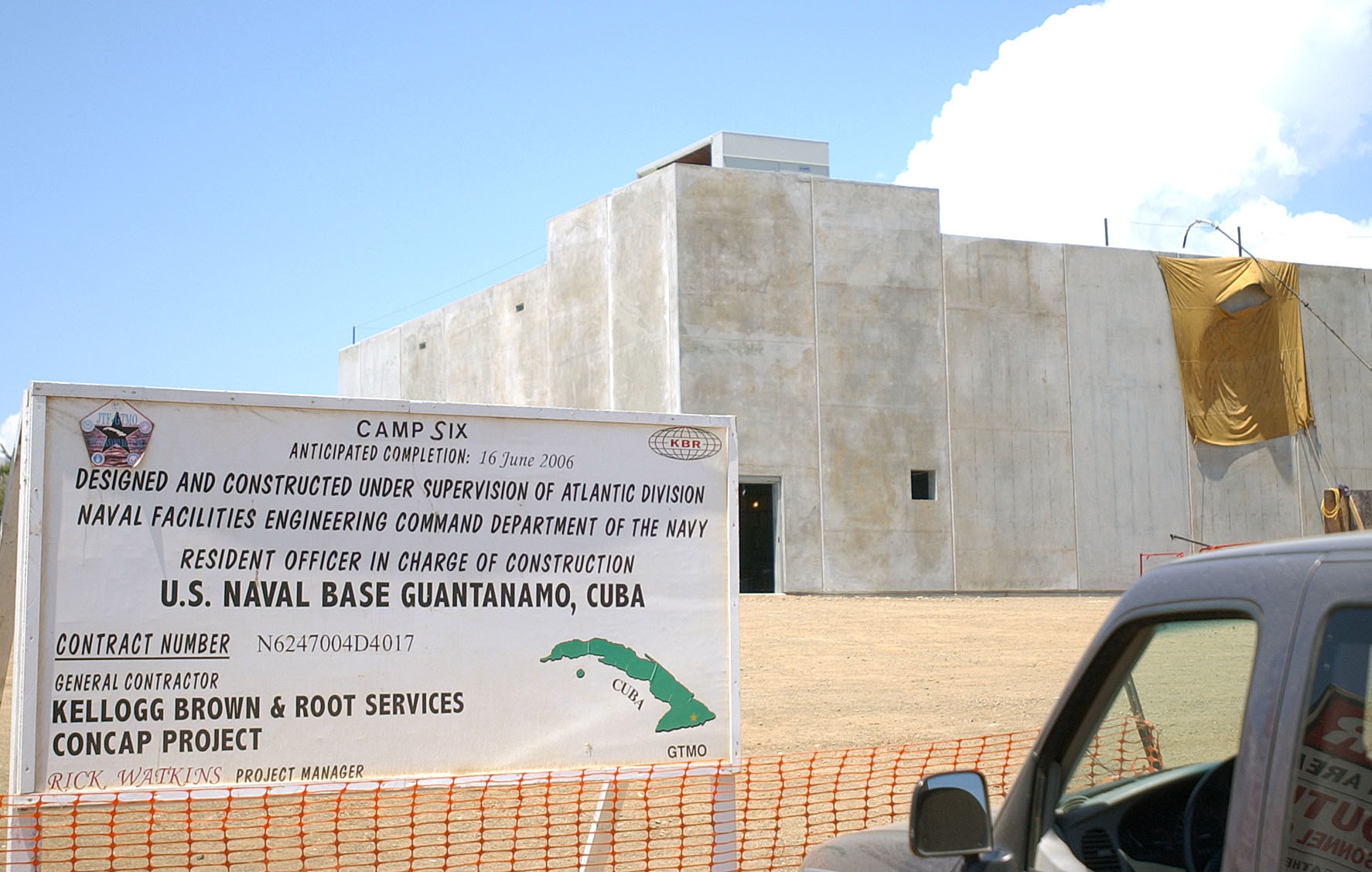
Camp six, under construction

Camp six detainees are shackled to the floor when they watch TV.

Camp Six, constructed by Halliburton, was modeled on US Federal medium-security penitentiaries.

It was constructed to have individual cells that surrounded and looked in on a communal mess area, where it was planned compliant detainees could interact for part of the day. However, while the building was still under construction, the decision was made to confine all detainees to their cells, except when they were taken to shower, taken for solitary exercise, or for official business. The communal areas were left unused. This transformed the facility to a high-security facility.

In April 2010 The Guardian published a photo essay that showed that a TV had been installed in the common areas. Detainees were shackled to the floor during their TV privileges.

== Camp seven ==
Camp Seven, also known as Camp Platinum, is an isolated outpost, strictly off-limits from the Pentagon's media tour. A group of six mostly military lawyers representing prisoners at Camp seven concluded in February 2012 that the conditions at the camp fall short of the minimum guarantees of humane treatment under the Geneva Conventions.

== Prisoner torture ==
In a 2005 interview, Erik Saar, an Arabic translator, said that Camp Delta prisoners were subjected to sexual interrogation techniques and physically assaulted by "snatch squads"; in one such case, a prisoner's arm was broken. He said that during an initial reaction force training, one U.S. soldier posing as a prisoner was beaten to the point of brain damage. Saar also told that Camp Delta employees deliberately ignored the Geneva Conventions.

In November 2007, WikiLeaks published a leaked document called "Camp Delta Standard Operating Procedures". The 238-page document includes rules for dealing with hunger strikes, as well as instructions on psychologically manipulating prisoners, intimidating them with the use of military dogs, and burying dead Muslim detainees. American Civil Liberties Union lawyer Jamil Dakwar raised concerns over the fact that some detainees were hidden from representatives of the International Committee of the Red Cross.

== See also ==
- Administrative Review Board
- Combatant Status Review Tribunal
- Guantanamo military commissions
- Platt Amendment – Document that Guarantees U.S. Navy use in Cuba
- Qur'an desecration controversy of 2005
