= Inside Guantanamo =

- Directed by: Jon Else

Original release
- Release: April 2009

The National Geographic produced a documentary entitled Inside Guantanamo, first broadcast in early April 2009. It details the practices inside Guantanamo Bay military prison.

The Director, Jon Else, wrote:

So much of what defines us as a nation in the last decade is crystallized at Guantanamo. If National Geographic Channel had not sent us down there to do this film, there would be no definitive documentary. I think that that history has to somehow be preserved and I hope that this film can have a hand in doing that.

Neil Genzlinger, reporting for New York Times, wrote:

Everything in the program, of course, has to be taken with a grain of salt: the soldiers all do and say the right things; the former prisoners (the ubiquitous Moazzam Begg is one) are nonthreatening as can be; and, under the restrictions imposed on the film crew by the military, the current prisoners are not heard from in direct interviews or even seen (thanks to blurring).

The film interviewed some key players who played a role in the controversial camp. Colonel Bruce Vargo called the camps: "an integral part of the war on terror." Lieutenant Commander Charles Swift, the Navy lawyer assigned to defend Salim Ahmed Hamdan, said: "Guantanamo Bay was the legal equivalent of outer space -- a place with no law."
