= Killing of William Jefferson =

William Arnold Jefferson
- Born: November 28, 1951
- Died: November 19, 1995 (aged 43)
- Occupation: Librarian
- Known for: Murdered in Bosnia and Herzegovina

William Arnold Jefferson (November 28, 1951 – November 19, 1995) was an American librarian and United Nations employee who was killed while serving in Bosnia and Herzegovina. Jefferson was found shot to death near Banovići, Bosnia and Herzegovina. He was a New Jersey native, who would have turned 44 a week after the day his body was found near Banovići, in northeast Bosnia and Herzegovina, not far from where the NATO peace mission and U.S. military headquarters was established. He is survived by a son and a brother. His killing was described as a criminal act, with his car and all of his valuables stolen.

== Volunteer U.N. engagement and death ==
Jefferson was from Camden, New Jersey. He started working for the U.N. in its Dag Hammarskjöld Library in 1982. In 1992 he volunteered to serve on overseas U.N. missions, first serving in Somalia. He then moved to serve as the U.N. volunteer worker in Bosnia and Herzegovina, after the peace agreement was signed and Nato troops deployed.

Jefferson was shot twice to the head and his body found near town of Banovići, in the northeast Bosnia and Herzegovina, not far from where the NATO peace mission and U.S. military headquarters was established. He was 43 and would have turned 44 a week after he was found. His killing was described as a criminal act, with his car and all of his valuables stolen. Joe Sills, a U.N. spokesperson stated: "There was every reason to believe that the motives were criminal and not political. Mr. Jefferson's car was stolen, and his personal belongings were missing." A week later The New York Times reported that "United Nations officials strongly suspect that he was killed by the mujahedeen, who may have mistaken him for a British citizen." Suspicion were later raised that the person responsible for the murder was Saudi Arabian Ahmed Zaid Salim Zuhair, who will later be detained at Guantanamo under unrelated terrorism charges. Reason for the suspicion was Jefferson's watch found in Zuhair's possession.

Zuhair's attorneys have pointed out that Zuhair was never charged in connection with the killing, despite extensive investigations by the UN, FBI, and Bosnian authorities. Bosnian authorities issued an arrest warrant for Fa'iz al-Shanbari in 1998 in relation to the shooting. The U.N.'s 200-page investigation made no mention of Zuhair. Zuhair was cleared for release by the Bush administration and finally repatriated to Saudi Arabia on June 12, 2009.

During a hearing of the Senate Judiciary Committee on June 17, 2009, Attorney General Eric Holder publicly admitted that Zuhair had been cleared for transfer from Guantanamo by both administrations because "there was no sufficient proof" linking him to the Jefferson killing.
