= Muhammad Saad Iqbal =

Pakistani citizen (born 1977)

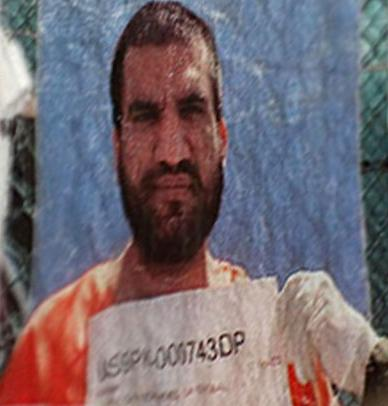
- Department of Defense photograph
- Born: October 17, 1977 (age 49)
- Detained at: Bagram and Guantanamo
- Other name: Hafez Qari Mohamed Saad Iqbal Madni
- ISN: 743
- Charge: No charge (held in extrajudicial detention)
- Status: Repatriated September 8, 2008

Muhammad Saad Iqbal is a Pakistani citizen who was held in extrajudicial detention in the United States Guantanamo Bay detention camps, in Cuba. Madni's Guantanamo Internment Serial Number was 743. The Department of Defense reports that he was born on October 17, 1977.

Madni was arrested in Jakarta after he asked about the whereabouts of an American official, prompting accusations that he intended to assassinate the individual. After six months in captivity, he attempted suicide and was subsequently relabeled as "non-compliant" by his captors.

He was released in 2008 after six years imprisonment, and returned to Pakistan. His government said that he would not face any criminal charges, and that he was returning to his life. On 19 August 2009, the UK arm of the legal charity Reprieve commenced legal action on behalf of Madni, seeking information from the UK government about whether Madni had been rendered through Diego Garcia.

== Combatant Status Review ==
Muhammad Saad Iqbal was among the 60% of prisoners who participated in the tribunal hearings. A Summary of Evidence memo was prepared for the tribunal of each detainee. The memo accused him of the following:

a The detainee is a member of al Qaida.

1. The detainee is an al Qaida operative.
2. The detainee ascertained the plans and movements of a US government official for the purpose of inflicting harm of death to that official.
3. The detainee claimed prior knowledge of a terrorist act
4. The detainee engaged in planning of and surveillance for, a proposed terrorist act.

=== Transcript ===
The Department of Defense published a 13 summarized transcript from his 2004 CSR Tribunal.

=== Testimony ===
Madni told his Tribunal that he was wearing the orange jumpsuit that non-compliant captives were made to wear because of a suicide attempt he had made on the 191st day of his detention.

== Publication of captives' CSR Tribunal documents ==
In September 2007 the Department of Justice published dossiers of unclassified documents arising from the Combatant Status Review Tribunals of 179 captives. A habeas corpus petition was filed on behalf of " Muhammed Saad Iqbal Madni" on December 13, 2005. But his dossier was not one of those the DoD published.

=== Administrative Review Board ===
Detainees whose Combatant Status Review Tribunal labeled them "enemy combatants" were scheduled for annual Administrative Review Board hearings. These hearings were designed to assess the threat a detainee might pose if released or transferred, and whether there were other factors that warranted his continued detention.

=== First annual Administrative Review Board ===
A Summary of Evidence memo was prepared for Hafez Qari Mohamed Saad Iqbal Madni's first annual Administrative Review Board on October 19, 2005. The two page memo listed nine "primary factors favor[ing] continued detention" and zero "primary factors favor[ing] release or transfer". Those factors included denunciations from unnamed informants that he claimed to be a member of al Qaida, that he plotted assassinations, that he was related to a female member of the extremist Ak Ikhwan Al Muslimoon Group in Indonesia, and that he had stated:

The detainee stated it was better to kill one U.S. Government Official than 100 Americans.

==== Transcript ====
Madni chose to participate in his Administrative Review Board hearing.

==== Preliminary meeting with Assisting Military Officer ====
Madni's preliminary meeting with his Assisting Military Officer took place on November 29, 2005. Madni said he would attend. His Assisting Military Officer described him as responsive, polite and attentive, during this meeting, but highly skeptical, based on his experience Combatant Status Review Tribunal.

=== Second annual Administrative Review Board ===
A Summary of Evidence memo was prepared for Hafes Qari Mohammed Saad Iqbal Madni's second annual Administrative Review Board on October 19, 2005. The two page memo listed nine "primary factors favor[ing] continued detention" and two "primary factors favor[ing] release or transfer".

In addition to the allegations listed on the earlier memos the 2006 memo stated he had visited with members of al Qaida in Jakarta, Indonesia, that he met the Secretary General of the Islamic Defenders Front, that he had seen weapons at the house of his new militant acquaintances, and he had been told about two failed terrorist attacks in which they had participated—an attempt to use a car bomb against the US embassy, and an attempt to attack an airliner. One factor offered as a justification for his further detention stated:

The detainee stated that because of his ability to memorize and sing the Koran at the age of twelve he became famous in Saudi Arabia and Pakistan, he was introduced to presidents, kings and princes. The detainee stated that he won approximately five million dollars in prize money from Koran competitions.

=== Third annual Administrative Review Board ===
A Summary of Evidence memo was prepared for Hafes Qari Mohammed Saad Iqbal Madni's annual Administrative Review Board on December 27, 2007. The two page memo listed just four "primary factors favor[ing] continued detention" and two "primary factors favor[ing] release or transfer".

All four of the factors favoring his continued detention concerned a leadership role he played in a student group, the Sipah-e-Islam Pakistan, which was an adjunct to a violent anti-Shi'a group, the Sipah-e-Sahaba Pakistan. The factors stated these two groups followed the Deobandi School, and were created in reaction to the Iranian revolution, and that the SSP group was behind the assassination of the Iranian Ambassador to Pakistan in the early 1990s. More recently the groups organized political rallies.

The factors favoring his release or transfer stated that he feared being returned to Pakistan, and that:

The detainee stated that with regard to his relationship to a known jihadists, he made a mistake when he got involved with bad people at a young age.

Earlier allegations that he personally was involved in hostile acts were all dropped in this memo.

==== Third annual Board recommendations ====
One January 9, 2009, the Department of Defense released two heavily redacted memos, from his Board, to Gordon R. England, the Designated Civilian Official. The Board's recommendation was unanimous The Board's recommendation was redacted. England authorized his continued detention on March 17, 2008.

== Habeas corpus petition ==
A writ of habeas corpus was filed on Hafez Qari Mohamed Saad Iqbal Madni's behalf.

=== Military Commissions Act ===
The Military Commissions Act of 2006 mandated that Guantanamo captives were no longer entitled to access the US civil justice system, so all outstanding habeas corpus petitions were stayed.

=== Boumediene v. Bush ===
On June 12, 2008 the United States Supreme Court ruled, in Boumediene v. Bush, that the Military Commissions Act could not remove the right for Guantanamo captives to access the US Federal Court system. And all previous Guantanamo captives' habeas petitions were eligible to be re-instated. The judges considering the captives' habeas petitions would be considering whether the evidence used to compile the allegations the men and boys were enemy combatants justified a classification of "enemy combatant".

=== Protective order ===
On 15 July 2008 Kristine A. Huskey filed a "NOTICE OF PETITIONERS' REQUEST FOR 30-DAYS NOTICE OF TRANSFER" on behalf of several dozen captives including Iqbal.

== Repatriation ==
A former Guantanamo captive named as "Qari Saad Madni" was repatriated on September 8, 2008. Pakistani officials stated he would soon be released without charge, following a debriefing. The Associated Press reported that Madni claimed he had tried to commit suicide during his first year in detention.

On September 19, 2008 Richard L. Cys, James P. Walsh filed "Petitioner Muhammed Saad Iqbal Madni's response to court order to show cause why his petition should not be dismissed as moot", as part of 05-CV-2385, on behalf of Muhammed Saad Iqbal Madni. Madni's lawyers argued his habeas petition should not be dismissed because he was entitled to continue to seek relief if his original detention was not legally justified. Further, his lawyer had not been advised of the conditions agreed upon by the US Government and the Pakistani Government:

Undersigned counsel have no knowledge regarding the terms and conditions of the agreement under which Mr Madni's physical custody was transferred to Pakistan. Respondents have not submitted any evidence to the court regarding the nature of Mr Madni's transfer or his current status in Pakistan. Accordingly, undersigned counsel does not know whether as part of his transfer the United States required that Mr Madni continue to be imprisoned, or after what period of time or under what conditions he might be released. Furthermore, undersigned counsel does not know whether Mr. Madni has at all times since his transfer remained imprisoned in Pakistan.

On 5 January 2009 the New York Times published a profile of Mohammed Saad Iqbal. The profile chronicled serious health problems during and after his repatriation, and was illustrated with a picture of him standing in a walker. The New York Times reported that senior US officials were prepared to confirm aspects of his account of himself—off the record. They informed the New York Times that, shortly after he had apprehended in Jakarta, during his first two days of interrogation analysts had decided he was a braggart and "wannabe" and should be immediately released:

He was a talker. He wanted to believe he was more important than he was.

He was first transferred for four months to a brutal interrogation center in Egypt, where he was housed in a 4 x 6-foot (1.8 m) cell he said "like a grave", and subjected to electric shocks during his interrogation. He was then transferred, for a year to the Bagram Theater Internment Facility.

He described harassment from other captives because he had never trained in Afghanistan.

Richard L. Cys of Davis Wright Tremaine is seeking relief for his long detention without charge, and for the release of his medical records, which may document his torture claims.

CIA spokesman Paul Gimigliano denied Madni had been subjected to illegal treatment:

The agency's terrorist detention program has used lawful means of interrogation, reviewed and approved by the Department of Justice and briefed to the Congress. This individual, from what I have heard of his account, appears to be describing something utterly different. I have no idea what he's talking about. The United States does not conduct or condone torture.

On January 19, 2009, the Daily Times reported that Iqbal had held a press conference in Islamabad where he demanded compensation for the treatment he received.

== Madani's declaration ==
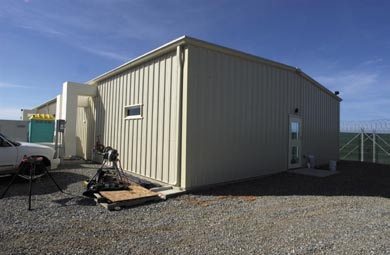
Guantanamo's Psychiatric ward.

Sa'd Iqbal Madani offered an affidavit in support of Ahmed Zaid Salem Zuhair's habeas corpus petition.

He declared that he and Mamdouh Habib had been sent to Egypt for interrogation. His interrogators were all Egyptians, but Americans were always present, and passed notes to the Egyptian interrogators. His interrogations include electric shock, beatings, being interrogated while drugged, and being locked in a cell so small he could not sit up, or lie down. He and Habib were transferred to the Bagram Theater Internment Facility, where he reported Koran desecration and brutal beatings. In Bagram he was held in the same cell as Moazzam Begg and Ahmed Zaid Salem Zuhair. three months of torture

He declared that as a consequence of his electric shocks to his head in Egypt he developed a life-threatening bone infection, but medical treatment was withheld because his interrogators characterized him as being uncooperative. He declared he was confined the Psychiatric wing for six months—as punishment.

== UK Legal Action ==
On August 19, 2009, the UK arm of the legal charity Reprieve commenced legal action on behalf of Mr Madni against the UK Foreign Secretary. The litigation seeks

disclosure of material held by the Secretary of State or within his control that evidences his extraordinary rendition through Diego Garcia and that would assist him in identifying and bringing proceedings against those US (and, if applicable, UK) personnel involved in his detention, unlawful rendition and torture

== See also ==
- Bagram torture and prisoner abuse
