= Bruce Vargo =

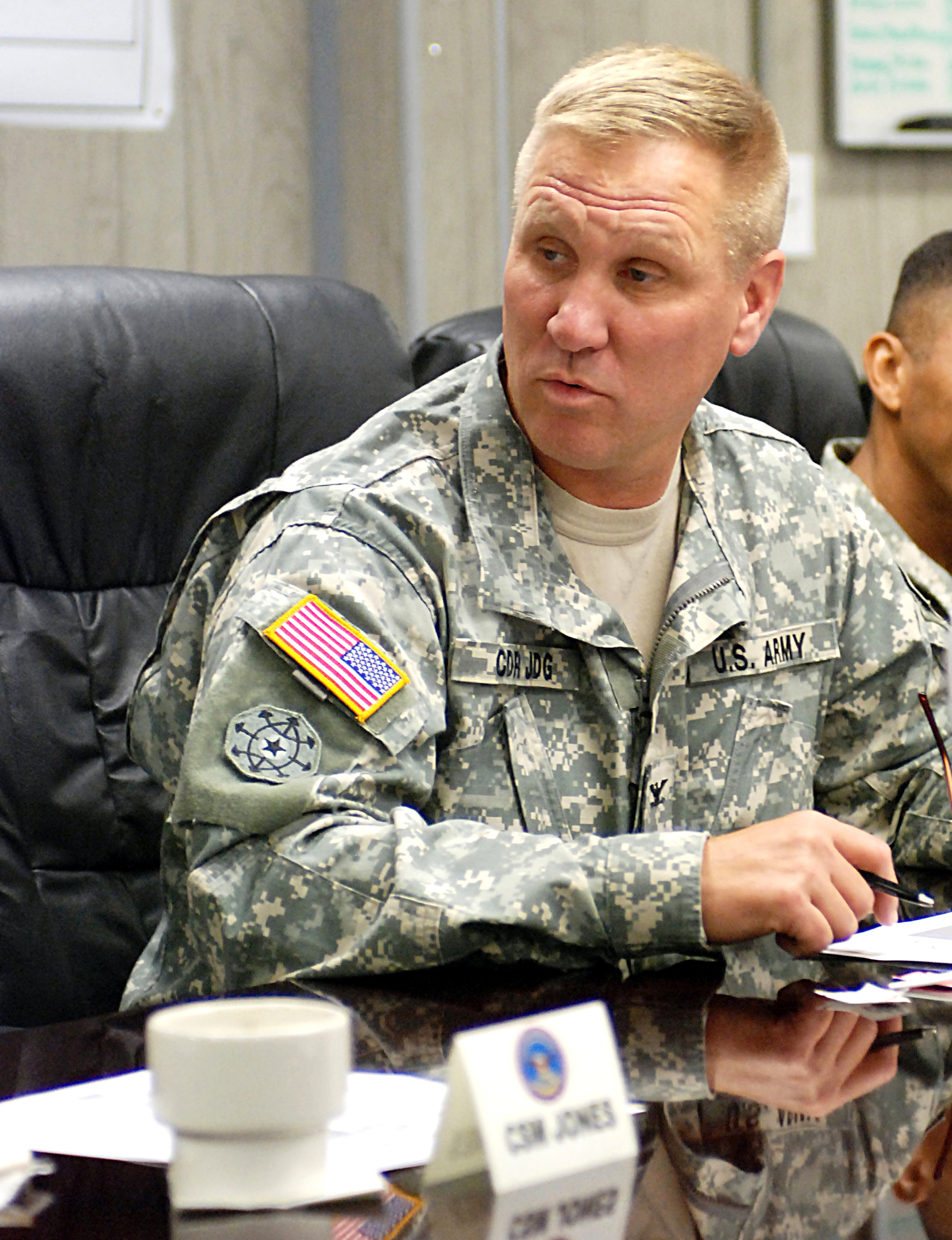
- Military career
- Branch: US Army
- Rank: Colonel

Colonel Bruce Vargo is a Military Police officer in the United States Army. He was appointed the commander of Joint Task Force Guantanamo's Joint Detention Group—its guard force from 2008 to 2009. Vargo was one of the officers interviewed for a National Geographic documentary entitled "Inside Guantanamo".

Vargo confirmed the existence of secret Camp 7, and confirmed that he was responsible for the security at all the other camps, but not Camp 7.

Vargo was interviewed in February 2008, about attempts to treat captives more humanely, and to offer classes to provide intellectual stimulation. He defended the new humane efforts on the grounds that captives distracted by classes would be less likely to attack the guards under his command.

Vargo was interviewed about the use of extreme force in the force-feeding of hunger striker Ahmed Zaid Salim Zuhair.

ISN 669 has a very long history of disciplinary violations and noncompliant, resistant and combative behavior.

Vargo was previously an award-winning amateur wrestler. Vargo has also competed on the US team of a form of unarmed combat developed in the former Soviet Union called "SAMBO"(short for "SAMozaschita Bez Oruzhiya", self-defense without weapons ).
