= David H. Remes =

American lawyer (born 1954)

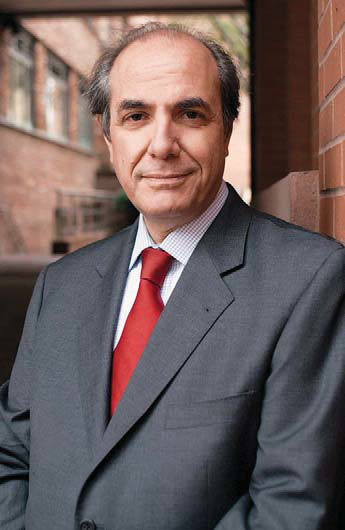
Lawyer David Remes in Harvard Magazine

David H. Remes (born 1954) is an American lawyer.

Remes is a former partner at the law firm Covington & Burling. His planned resignation was announced on July 18, 2008. Most recently, Remes was "Counsel" at the Washington, DC law firm Gilbert LLP. Remes is among the Guantanamo Bay attorneys and has been recognized for his human rights work.

== Volunteered to serve Guantanamo captives ==
Remes is notable for volunteering to serve as a pro bono attorney for some of the captives held in extrajudicial detention in the United States Guantanamo Bay detention camps, in Cuba.

Remes played a role in a challenge focused around the captives' detention based on an avenue of appeal that the Detainee Treatment Act of 2005 (DTA) opened. The DTA closed the opportunity for captives who had not yet had writs of habeas corpus filed on their behalf. But the DTA allowed captives to challenge the determinations of their Combatant Status Review Tribunals, that they were properly classified as "enemy combatants". The DTA allowed captives to challenge the enemy combatant determination if the Tribunal failed to follow the rules laid out in their mandate.

One aspect of that challenge was a request that the court force the DoD to release more information on the evidence used to justify the captive's detention. Leading officials in the United States counter-terrorism establishment appealed a July 20, 2007 appeals court ruling forcing the release of information about the captives on national security grounds. Remes responded:

This is just a smoke screen to hide the fact that they can’t justify the detentions,

Remes is one of the attorneys for Saifullah Paracha, a Pakistani businessman who lived in the US for several years, who is suffering from serious heart disease. Paracha has been appealing to get permission to travel temporarily to an American hospital for heart surgery. Camp authorities claim his heart surgery could be performed in Guantanamo's infirmary. They complained that $400,000 had been spent preparing the infirmary for his surgery. Paracha's lawyers have argued that previous procedures at Guantanamo have been botched.

== Brought Guantanamo cases to Federal court under the Detainee Treatment Act ==
The Detainee Treatment Act of 2005 (DTA) closed off the right of Guantanamo captives to submit new petitions of habeas corpus. (Pending cases were left open.) The DTA opened a path for Guantanamo captives to submit a limited appeal to Federal Courts of appeal in Washington DC. The Military Commission Act of 2006 (MCA) closed down the pending habeas corpus cases. Attorneys for the captives have both initiated a challenge to the constitutionality of the MCA's stripping of the right to habeas corpus; and they have initiated appeals in the DC Federal Courts of appeal.

The DTA's limited avenue of appeal only allows challenges as to whether the Combatant Status Review Tribunal correctly followed their rules. Remes was one of the first lawyers to initiate an appeal in the DC courts.

== Remes reacts to the Governments desire to "rewrite detainee evidence" ==
On June 20, 2008, the Associated Press reported that the Government wanted to "rewrite detainee evidence". The impetus to rewrite the evidence is a reaction to the Supreme Court's June 12, 2008 ruling on Boumediene v. Bush. The Supreme Court had ruled that Guantanamo captives were entitled to challenge the basis for their detention through the US Justice System, because the Combatant Status Review Tribunals were not an adequate substitute for habeas corpus. According to the Associated Press:

At a closed-door meeting with judges and defense attorneys this week, government lawyers said they needed time to add new evidence and make other changes to evidentiary documents known as "factual returns."

The Associated Press quoted Remes reaction to this development.

It's sort of an admission that the original returns were defective. It's also an admission that the government thinks it needs to beef up the evidence.

The following month, on July 14, Remes put advocacy on display at a news conference by removing his pants to protest the "constant body searches" of Muslim prisoner held at Guantanamo.

== Defense of Adnan Latif ==
Remes continued his pro bono legal work on behalf of captives held in extra judicial detention at Guantanamo Bay, taking on the case of Adnan Farhan Abd Al Latif one of his most notable clients.

Though Latif was ordered to be released in 2004, 2007, 2009 and lastly in July 2010 by district court Judge Henry H. Kennedy, Jr., an appeals court that handles Guantanamo habeas cases reversed the decision in October 2011, and in 2012 the Supreme Court turned down the Latif case.

Remes was quoted in a CNN article as saying related to the Latif case and efforts to get Latif transferred or released "So now, the executive is against transfers, Congress is against transfers and the courthouse doors are shut," "All three branches of the government are aligned against us.".

On September 8, 2012, Latif, who had a history of mental illness, was said to have committed suicide by the Department of Defense. and Remes via Amnesty International promised to continue his work on behalf of Guantanamo detainees who have been ordered released, only to have their cases reversed by appeals courts. However, Latif's cause of death is now in question.

== Publications ==
- "Playboy's Progeny: Court's Cable TV Decision Bodes Well for Internet and Commercial Speech" (PDF). Legal Times. June 5, 2000.
