= Sami Essid =

Sami bin Khamis bin Salih Essid (Arabic: سامي بن خميس بن صالح الصيد) a.k.a. Essid Sami Ben Khemais was the head of al-Qaeda's Italian cell until his arrest outside Milan in April 2001. He received a five-year sentence for trafficking in arms, explosives, and chemicals. Essid remains under embargo by the United Nations Security Council Committee 1267 as an affiliate of al-Qaeda, and by the US Treasury for his terrorist activity. Around 1 July 2007, fresh charges against Sami Essid were read in Italy, where he was still in custody.

According to the UN, he was born on 10 February 1968 in Menzel Jemil, Bizerte Governorate, Tunisia.

He called a cell phone held by Saber Mohammed - believed to have been acting as a messenger for Mosa Zi Zemmori and Driss Elatellah.

== Guantanamo connection ==
Following the United States Supreme Court ruling in Rasul v. Bush, the United States Department of Defense was forced to conduct reviews of the combatant status of the captives held in extrajudicial detention in its Guantanamo Bay detainment camps, in Cuba.

The allegations that Guantanamo counter-terror analysts offered to justify the detention of several of these captives assert that they had an association with Sami Essid, or the Sami Essid Network.

Alleged connections between Sami Essid and Guantanamo captives
| Ridah Bin Saleh Al Yazidi | Two of the allegations against Ridah Bin Saleh Al Yazidi were: "The detainee attended the Islamic Cultural Institute in Milan. One of the leaders of the mosque was Sheikh Anwar Sha'ban who spoke frequently of the Jihad ongoing in Bosnia. Sheikh Anwar Sha'ban was subsequently killed in the fighting in Jihad in Bosnia.; "The Italian Islamic Cultural Institute, referred to as ICI, was shut down by Italian authorities for housing the Sami Essid Ben Khemais network, which is the core for the Tunisian Combat Group in Italy. |
| Adel Ben Mabrouk | Two of the allegations against Adel Ben Mabrouk were: "The detainee was a member of the Sami Essid Network."; "The Sami Essid Network provides financial support to terrorist groups."; Mabrouk denied any knowledge of the Sami Essid Network. |
| Lufti Bin Ali | Two of the allegations against Lufti Bin Ali were: "The detainee met Pakistanis from the ICI Mosque in Milan who were trying to recruit people to go to Pakistan and Afghanistan."; "The Islamic Cultural Institute was known as the ICI. This mosque was shut down by Italian authorities for housing the Sami Essid Ben Khemais network, which is the core for the Tunisian Combat Group (TCG) in Italy." |
