= Mohammed Rajab Sadiq Abu Ghanim =

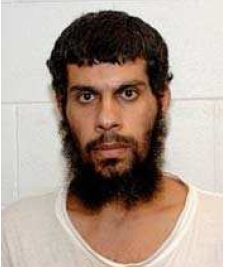
- Born: 1975 (age 50–51); Sanaa, Yemen
- Citizenship: Yemen
- Detained at: Guantanamo
- ISN: 44
- Charge(s): no charge, held in extrajudicial detention

Mohammed Rajab Sadiq Abu Ghanim (born 1975) was held in extrajudicial detention in the United States Guantanamo Bay detention camps, in Cuba, for almost fifteen years. His Guantanamo Internee Security Number is 44. He was eventually transferred to Saudi Arabia.

== Background ==
Mohammed is alleged to have volunteered to fight in the Bosnian War, and the Yemeni Civil War, prior to heading to Afghanistan to volunteer to serve as a fighter for the Taliban. He is alleged to have been an Osama bin Laden bodyguard, to know about a secret bigger than al-Qaeda's attacks on September 11, 2001, although he told interrogators he had only served with the Taliban, and had never met Osama bin Laden.

Carol Rosenberg, of the Miami Herald, has been tracking Guantanamo's first twenty captives, who arrived at Guantanamo on January 11, 2002. She eventually identified Ghanim as one of the first twenty individuals.

== Official status reviews ==
Originally the Bush Presidency asserted that captives apprehended in the "war on terror" were not covered by the Geneva Conventions, and could be held indefinitely, without charge, and without an open and transparent review of the justifications for their detention. In 2004, the United States Supreme Court ruled, in Rasul v. Bush, that Guantanamo captives were entitled to being informed of the allegations justifying their detention, and were entitled to try to refute them.

=== Office for the Administrative Review of Detained Enemy Combatants ===
Combatant Status Review Tribunals were held in a 3x5 meter trailer where the captive sat with his hands and feet shackled to a bolt in the floor.

Following the Supreme Court's ruling, the Department of Defense set up the Office for the Administrative Review of Detained Enemy Combatants.

Scholars at the Brookings Institution, led by Benjamin Wittes, listed the captives still held in Guantanamo in December 2008, according to whether their detention was justified by certain common allegations:

- Mohammed Rajab Sadiq Abu Ghanim was listed as one of the captives who "The military alleges ... traveled to Afghanistan for jihad."
- Mohammed Rajab Sadiq Abu Ghanim was listed as one of the captives who "The military alleges that the following detainees stayed in Al Qaeda, Taliban or other guest- or safehouses."
- Mohammed Rajab Sadiq Abu Ghanim was listed as one of the captives who "The military alleges ... fought for the Taliban."
- Mohammed Rajab Sadiq Abu Ghanim was listed as one of the captives who "The military alleges ... were at Tora Bora."
- Mohammed Rajab Sadiq Abu Ghanim was listed as one of the captives who "The military alleges ... served on Osama Bin Laden's security detail."
- Mohammed Rajab Sadiq Abu Ghanim was listed as one of the captives who was an "al Qaeda operative".
- Mohammed Rajab Sadiq Abu Ghanim was listed as one of the "82 detainees made no statement to CSRT or ARB tribunals or made statements that do not bear materially on the military's allegations against them."

- That he traveled to Afghanistan prior to al Qaeda's attacks on September 11, 2001, to engage in jihad;
- That he had fought in Yemen, Bosnia and Afghanistan;
- That he was associated with al Wafa;
- That he had claimed to have knowledge of future plans to attack the USA.
- That he was associated with the Pakistan-based missionary movement Tablighi Jamaat.

=== First annual Administrative Review Board hearing ===
A Summary of Evidence memo was prepared for Mohammed Rajab Sadiq Abu Ghanim's first annual Administrative Review Board in 2005. The six page memo listed fifty "primary factors favor[ing] continued detention" and four "primary factors favor[ing] release or transfer".

Thirteen of those factors justified his continued detention based on allegations he had volunteered to fight during the civil war in the former Yugoslavia that lead to the independence of Bosnia. He was alleged to have received a month of military training at a training camp for foreign volunteers in Mehrez, Bosnia, in 1994.

He was alleged to have fought in the Yemeni Civil War after leaving Bosnia following the signing of the Dayton Accords. He was alleged to have investigated traveling to volunteer as a fighter in Chechnya.

He was alleged to have traveled to volunteer as a fighter in Afghanistan in 2000. He was alleged to have been an Osama bin Laden bodyguard. However, he claimed he only fought with the Taliban, only served in Taliban units.

He was alleged to have told interrogators he knew something about a "serum" that, once injected, would dissolve bodies.

He was alleged to be related to someone who played a role in the USS Cole bombing.

The factors state that when he fled the American aerial bombardment of Afghanistan he was captured with about 30 other at the Pakistani border who were all sent to Guantanamo.

He was alleged to have an association with a charity called al Wafa that American intelligence officials assert has ties to terrorism. The factors stated he had recanted his confessions of an association with al Wafa, claiming: "It was a story he had made up because he was being beaten."

He was alleged to have told interrogators that he knew a very shocking secret, bigger than the attacks on September 11, 2001, which he was withholding from them.

If I were free, no one would be able to stop me from doing what I want to do, not even your intelligence people. If you cooperate with me, I will write down everything I know. As you have already noticed from your intelligence people, you couldn't stop what has already happened. The information I have already given is no longer important. All I need is to be left alone at my home to be able to do what I want to do. My information is so important and so dangerous, your intelligence and your FBI would never even imagine it, but I know.

The factors also recorded that the claimed this report of a big secret was due to translation errors, and he knew no big secrets.

=== Second annual Administrative Review Board hearing ===
A Summary of Evidence memo was prepared for Mohammed R. Abu Ghanim's second annual Administrative Review Board in 2006. The four page memo listed thirty-five "primary factors favor[ing] continued detention" and eight "primary factors favor[ing] release or transfer".

=== Third annual Administrative Review Board hearing ===
A Summary of Evidence memo was prepared for his third annual Administrative Review Board in 2007. The five page memo listed thirty-three "primary factors favor[ing] continued detention" and nine "primary factors favor[ing] release or transfer".

==== Board recommendations ====
One January 9, 2009, the Department of Defense published two heavily redacted memos, from his Board, to Gordon England, the Designated Civilian Official. The Board's recommendation was unanimous The Board's recommendation was redacted. England authorized his continued detention on March 17, 2008.

The Board considered reports from seven different agencies.

== Transfer to Saudi Arabia ==
Ghanim and three other men were transferred to Saudi Arabia, on January 5, 2017.
