= El Mashad v. Bush =

El Mashad v. Bush (Civil Action No. 2005-0270) is a writ of habeas corpus filed on behalf of several Guantanamo detainees, including Sherif el-Mashad, Adel Fattouh Aly Ahmed Algazzar and Alladeen.

Prior to 1997, Egyptian Sharif Fathi el-Mashad was living in Italy. In 1997, el-Mashad moved to Afghanistan to trade in clothing, but subsequently became involved in the ongoing Afghanistan civil war by joining "Islamic charities operating in Afghanistan." In late December 2001, U.S. forces arrested 27-year-old el-Mashad as he was seeking to leave Afghanistan for neighboring Pakistan. El-Mashad's family then received a letter from the International Committee of the Red Cross informing them that el-Mashad was being held at the Guantanamo Bay detention camp. In December 2003, Ambassador to Egypt David Welch indicated that the Guantanamo Bay detention camp was holding no more than five Egyptians.

In June 2004, the U.S. Supreme Court upheld the right of hundreds of prisoners detained without charges to challenge their detentions in U.S. courts. Subsequently, detainees Sharif el-Mashad, Ayman Matrafi, Fadel Reda el-Wakili, Adel Fathi Ali, el-Gazzar and Ahmed Habib at the U.S. Naval base in Guantanamo, Cuba, were categorized among the "least dangerous" detainees at the prison. Each had Egyptian nationality, with Ahmed Habib additionally having Australian nationality. In August 2004, the Egyptian human rights group Human Rights Association for Assistance to Prisoners (HRAAP) requested that Ambassador Welch provide "the truth on the fate of Sharif Fathi el-Mashad and the precise reasons for his continued detention" and to allow HRAAP's lawyers to visit the detainee. In November of that same year, Egypt asked the United States to return these five Egyptian detainees to Egypt.

In June 2006, the United States Department of Defense reported that three captives died in custody. The Department of Defense stated the three men committed suicide. At that time, lawyer-client communications between detainees and their counsel were governed by a protective order that sought to balance attorney access to their detainee clients with an eye to protecting national security interests. Camp authorities called the deaths "an act of asymmetric warfare", and suspected plans had been coordinated by the captive's attorney so they seized all the captives' documents, including the captives' copies of their habeas documents. The Department of Justice reported the seizure of the habeas documents.

The Military Commissions Act of 2006 mandated that Guantanamo captives were no longer entitled to access the US civil justice system, so all outstanding habeas corpus petitions were stayed. In July 2008, the United States Supreme Court ruled, in Boumediene v. Bush, that the Military Commissions Act could not remove the right for Guantanamo captives to access the US Federal Court system. And all previous Guantanamo captives' habeas petitions were eligible to be re-instated. The judges considering the captives' habeas petitions would be considering whether the evidence used to compile the allegations the men and boys were enemy combatants justified a classification of "enemy combatant".

On 9 September 2008, Zachary Katznelson filed a "Notice of Joinder in Petitioners' Response to Respondents' Request for Relief from Scheduling Order" with regard to Mohammed Abdulmalik in Civil Action No. 05-cv-764, 05-cv-1504, 05-cv-2349, 05-cv-748, 04-cv-2215, 05-1457, 05-cv-270, 08-cv-1440, 05-cv-2386 (CKK, RMC, GK, JR, RBW). Katznelson wrote:

Petitioners Abdullatif Nasser, Nabil Hadjarab, Ahmed Belbacha, Mohsen Ahbdrub Aboassy, Said Salim Bin Salman, Samir Najy Mukbel, Shaker Aamer, Jihad Dhiab, Sherif El-Mashad, Adel Fattough Al Gazzar, Mohammed Abdulmalik, Sayf Bin Abdullah and Ahmed Omar, join in Petitioners' Response to Respondents' Motion for Relief from Scheduling Order, filed with the Court Security Officer on September 8, 2008. The Notice of Filing of this Response was filed as Misc. Docket Number 357.

On 12 September 2008, Zachary Katznelson filed a "Memorandum of Understanding Regarding Access to Classified National Security Information" in Civil Action No. 05-cv-764, 05-cv-1504, 05-cv-2349, 05-cv-748, 04-cv-2215, 05-1457, 05-cv-270, 08-cv-1440, 05-cv-2386 (CKK, RMC, GK, JR, RBW).
