= List of Egyptian detainees at Guantanamo Bay =

The United States Department of Defense acknowledges holding eight Egyptian detainees at Guantanamo Bay. A total of 780 captives have been held in extrajudicial detention in the Guantanamo Bay detention camps, in Cuba since the camps opened on January 11, 2002 The camp population peaked in 2004 at approximately 660. Only nineteen new captives, all "high value detainees" have been transferred there since the United States Supreme Court's ruling in Rasul v. Bush. As of February 24, 2010, the camp population stood at 188.

On February 24, 2010, Carol Rosenberg, of the Miami Herald, reported that Albania accepted the transfer of three former captives, an Egyptian, Sharif Fati Ali al Mishad, and Saleh Bin Hadi Asasi and Rauf Omar Mohammad Abu al Qusin, a Tunisian and a Libyan. The men will not be allowed to leave Albania.

isn	name	arrival date	departure date	notes
190	Sharif Fati Ali Al Mishad	2002-05-01	2012-02-25	Reportedly, harsh conditions in Guantanamo have left him with slurred speech.
287	Sami Abdul Aziz Salim Allaithy	2002-02-11	2005-09-30	Became a paraplegic in Guantanamo—reports it was due to an unprovoked beating in the prison hospital.; Left Egypt after criticizing its government for being anti-democratic, when his passport expired the only place left for him to live was Afghanistan.; Three writs of habeas corpus were submitted on his behalf—but none of them were published when the Department of Defense published 179 other habeas petitions.; Determined not to have been an enemy combatant, after all.; According to the official list of release dates he left Guantanamo on September 30, 2005.
369	Adel al-Gazzar	2002-01-20	2010-01	Was captured while having a wound from the American aerial bombardment of Afghanistan treated.; Was injured during the American aerial bombardment of Afghanistan, and had his leg amputated above the knee by Guantanamo medical staff.; Had a writ of habeas corpus filed on his behalf.
535	Tariq Mahmoud Ahmed Al Sawah	2002-05-05	2016-01-26	Originally from Egypt, acknowledged volunteering to fight against the Soviet occupation of Afghanistan during the 1980s.
661	Mamdouh Habib	2002-05-03	2005-01-17	An Australian who was born in Egypt.; Spent several years in Egyptian custody, where he reports he was tortured.; He was transferred to Australia on January 27, 2005.
663	Fael Roda Al-Waleeli	2002-06-07	2003-07-01	According to the BBC he was still in Guantanamo on November 19, 2004—four months into the CSR Tribunal process. But there is no record that a Tribunal was convened for him.; On March 28, 2008 the Egyptian newspaper Al Ahram reported that Fael had been transferred from Guantanamo "three years earlier", but that they had been unable to find out any reliable information about what happened to him after his transfer.; On November 26, 2008 the Department of Defense published a list of the dates when captives departed from Guantanamo. According to that list he was repatriated on July 1, 2003.
716	Allah Muhammed Saleem	2002-08-05	2006-11-17	Determined not to have been an enemy combatants after all.; Released to Albania, on January 7, 2007, where he has applied for asylum.; According to the official list of release dates he left Guantanamo on November 17, 2006.
