= Ali Ahmad Muhammad Al Rahizi =

Yemeni detainee in Guantanamo Bay

Ali Ahmad Muhammad Al Rahizi علي أحمد محمد أل رهيز
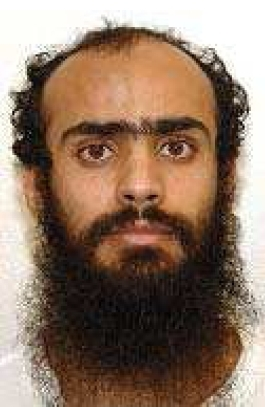
- Al Rahizi's official Guantanamo identity portrait, showing him wearing the white uniform issued to compliant individuals
- Born: October 13, 1979 (age 47); Taiz, Yemen
- Released: 27 October 2021; Mukalla, Yemen
- Detained at: Guantanamo
- ISN: 45
- Charge: N/A (extrajudicial detention)
- Status: Released

Ali Ahmad Muhammad Al Rahizi (Arabic: علي أحمد محمد أل رهيز) is a Yemeni prisoner who was held in extrajudicial detention in the United States Guantanamo Bay detainment camps, in Cuba. His Guantanamo Internment Serial Number is 45. Joint Task Force Guantanamo counter-terrorism analysts reports he was born on October 13, 1979, in Taiz, Yemen.

He was one of the first twenty Guantanamo captives, sent there on January 11, 2002, and called "the worst of the worst". Guantanamo analysts characterized him as one of the "Dirty Thirty". In 2009, he was classified as a "forever prisoner"—an individual for whom there was no evidence they had committed a war crime, who, nevertheless, was considered too dangerous to release. A Periodic Review Board hearing, in April 2014, reversed this determination. He was transferred to the United Arab Emirates on November 16, 2015, with four other Yemenis. He was repatriated to Yemen on 27 October 2021.

== Official status reviews ==
Originally the Bush Presidency asserted that captives apprehended in the "war on terror" were not covered by the Geneva Conventions, and could be held indefinitely, without charge, and without an open and transparent review of the justifications for their detention. In 2004, the United States Supreme Court ruled, in Rasul v. Bush, that Guantanamo captives were entitled to being informed of the allegations justifying their detention, and were entitled to try to refute them.

=== Office for the Administrative Review of Detained Enemy Combatants ===
Combatant Status Review Tribunals were held in a 3x5 meter trailer where the captive sat with his hands and feet shackled to a bolt in the floor.

Following the Supreme Court's ruling the Department of Defense set up the Office for the Administrative Review of Detained Enemy Combatants.

Scholars at the Brookings Institution, led by Benjamin Wittes, listed the captives still held in Guantanamo in December 2008, according to whether their detention was justified by certain common allegations:

- Ali Ahmad Muhammad Al Rahizi was listed as one of the captives who "The military alleges ... are members of Al Qaeda."
- Ali Ahmad Muhammad Al Rahizi was listed as one of the captives who "The military alleges that the following detainees stayed in Al Qaeda, Taliban or other guest- or safehouses."
- Ali Ahmad Muhammad Al Rahizi was listed as one of the captives who "The military alleges ... took military or terrorist training in Afghanistan."
- Ali Ahmad Muhammad Al Rahizi was listed as one of the captives who "The military alleges that the following detainees were captured under circumstances that strongly suggest belligerency."
- Ali Ahmad Muhammad Al Rahizi was listed as one of the captives who "The military alleges ... served on Osama Bin Laden’s security detail."
- Ali Ahmad Muhammad Al Rahizi was listed as one of the captives who was an "al Qaeda operative".
- Ali Ahmad Muhammad Al Rahizi was listed as one of the "82 detainees made no statement to CSRT or ARB tribunals or made statements that do not bear materially on the military’s allegations against them."

=== habeas corpus ===
A writ of habeas corpus, Ali Ahmed Mohammed Al Rezehi v. George W. Bush, was submitted on Ali Ahmed Mohammed Al Rezehi's behalf. In response, on October 14, 2004, the Department of Defense released 26 pages of unclassified documents related to his Combatant Status Review Tribunal.

== Mentioned in the "No-hearing hearings" study ==
According to the study entitled, No-hearing hearings, there was an anomaly in Al Rahizi's record. Al Rahizi's Personal Representative met with him for twenty minutes on September 23, 2004. Al Rahizi's Tribunal convened on September 28, 2004, without Al Rahizi being present.

The study quoted from the Summary of the Basis for Tribunal Decision:

The detainee understood the Tribunal Proceedings, but chose not to participate . . . The Tribunal questioned the personal representative closely on this matter and was satisfied that the personal representative had made every effort to ensure that the detainee had made an informed decision.

The study then commented:

The Tribunal’s close questioning of the personal representative is problematic because the form the personal representative presented to the Tribunal stated that the he had neither read nor left a written copy of the procedures with the detainee.

=== Formerly secret Joint Task Force Guantanamo assessment ===
On April 25, 2011, whistleblower organization WikiLeaks published formerly secret assessments drafted by Joint Task Force Guantanamo analysts. His Joint Task Force Guantanamo assessment was nine pages long, and was drafted on June 20, 2008. It was signed by camp commandant Rear Admiral David M. Thomas Jr. He recommended continued detention.

== Transfer ==
Guantanamo analysts characterized him as one of the "Dirty Thirty". In 2009, he was classified as a "forever prisoner" as an individual for whom there was no evidence he had committed a war crime but still was considered too dangerous to release. A Periodic Review Board hearing, held in April 2014, reversed this determination. He was transferred to the United Arab Emirates on November 16, 2015, along with four other Yemenis.

== Release ==
Al Rahizi was repatriated to Yemen and released on 27 October 2021.
