= Lazhar =

Lazhar may refer to:

- Monsieur Lazhar and the titular character, Bachir Lazhar
- Lazhar Hadj Aïssa (born 1984), Algerian footballer
- Lazhar Bououni (1948–2017), Tunisian politician
- Lazhar Karoui Chebbi (born 1927)
- Lazhar Ben Mohamed Tlil
