= Asim Thahit Abdullah al Khalaqi =

Asim Thahit Abdullah Al Khalaqi
- Born: 1968; Riyadh, Saudi Arabia
- Died: 2015 (aged 46–47); Kyzylorda, Kazakhstan
- Detained at: Guantanamo
- Other name: Asim Thabit Al Khalaqi
- ISN: 152
- Penalty: Extrajudicial detention
- Status: Deceased

Asim Thahit Abdullah Al Khalaqi (1968–2015), also known as Asim Thabit Al Khalaqi, was a citizen of Yemen, who was held in extrajudicial detention in the United States Guantanamo Bay detention camp, in Cuba. His Guantanamo Internment Serial Number is 152. Joint Task Force Guantanamo counter-terrorism analysts believe Khalaqi was born in 1968 in Riyadh, Saudi Arabia.

On December 30, 2014, Khalaqi was transferred to the custody of Kazakhstan with four other Guantanamo detainees. They were prevented from being repatriated to Yemen because of its uncertain political state. Al Khalaqi died of chronic kidney failure 129 days after his transfer.

== Official status reviews ==
In the early years of his response to the 9/11 attacks, United States President George W. Bush asserted that captives apprehended in the "war on terror" were not covered by the Geneva Conventions. He said they could be held indefinitely at the detention center his government set up at Guantanamo Bay Naval Base, on the island of Cuba, without charge, and without an open and transparent review of the justifications for their detention. In 2004, the United States Supreme Court ruled, in Rasul v. Bush, that Guantanamo captives were entitled to being informed of the allegations justifying their detention, and were entitled to try to refute them.

=== Office for the Administrative Review of Detained Enemy Combatants ===
Following the Supreme Court's ruling, the Department of Defense set up the Office for the Administrative Review of Detained Enemy Combatants.

A Summary of Evidence memo was prepared for Asim Thahit Abdullah Al Khalaqi's 2004 Combatant Status Review Tribunal, on November 4, 2004.

Scholars at the Brookings Institution, led by Benjamin Wittes, listed the captives still held in Guantanamo in December 2008, according to whether their detention was justified by certain common allegations:

- Khalaqi was listed as one of the captives who the Wittes team were unable to identify as cleared for release or transfer. He was listed as one of the captives who "The military alleges ... are associated with both Al Qaeda and the Taliban."
- He was identified as one of the captives who "The military alleges that the following detainees stayed in Al Qaeda, Taliban or other guest- or safehouses." In addition, the military alleged that he took "military or terrorist training in Afghanistan."
- Khalaqi was listed as one of the captives who "The military alleges ... fought for the Taliban."
- Khalaqi was listed as one of the captives whose "names or aliases were found on material seized in raids on Al Qaeda safehouses and facilities."
- Khalaqi was listed as one of the captives who was a foreign fighter.
- Khalaqi was listed as one of the captives who "say that they were doing charity work."

Khalaqi chose to participate in his Combatant Status Review Tribunal. The DoD published a thirteen-page summarized transcript.

On July 12, 2006, the magazine Mother Jones provided excerpts from the transcripts of a selection of reviews of the Guantanamo detainees. Khalaqi was one of the detainees profiled. According to the article, his transcript contained the following exchange:

| al khalaqi: | Are these evidence or accusations? |
| tribunal president: | They are in the form of both... |
| Al Khalaqi: | I'm sorry, I just don't understand. How does it fit the two pictures or definitions? For example, if I say this table is the chair and the chair is the table and they are the same thing, does that make sense? |
| tribunal president: | No, that doesn't make sense. But this process makes sense to me and hopefully it will make sense to you, because you're the one who's going to have to provide us with evidence and tell us that you did or did not do these things as listed on the summary of evidence. |
| Al Khalaqi: | So I just answer the accusations. But I'm going to call it accusations. I'm not going to call it evidence. |
| tribunal president: | Very well, you can call it as you wish. |

=== Habeas corpus submission ===
Khalaqi was one of the sixteen Guantanamo captives whose amalgamated habeas corpus submissions were heard by US District Court Judge Reggie B. Walton on January 31, 2007.

On June 12, 2008, the United States Supreme Court ruled, in Boumediene v. Bush, that the Military Commissions Act could not remove the right for Guantanamo captives to access the US Federal Court system. And all previous Guantanamo captives' habeas petitions were re-instated. In July 2008, Civil Action No. 05-CV-999 was re-filed on Asim Ben Thabit Al-Khalaqi's behalf. His was the sole case in 05-CV-999.

=== Formerly secret Joint Task Force Guantanamo assessment ===
On April 25, 2011, the whistleblower organization WikiLeaks published formerly secret assessments drafted by Joint Task Force Guantanamo analysts. A nine-page assessment was drafted on January 1, 2007. It was signed by camp commandant Harry B. Harris Jr., who recommended continued detention. His 2007 JTF-GTMO assessment characterized him as a "medium risk".

=== Joint Review Task Force ===
When he assumed office in January 2009 President Barack Obama made a number of promises about the future of Guantanamo. He promised the use of torture would cease at the camp. He promised to institute a new review system. That new review system was composed of officials from six departments, where the OARDEC reviews were conducted entirely by the Department of Defense. When it reported back, a year later, the Joint Review Task Force classified the individuals as either eligible to be charged; eligible for release; or too dangerous to be transferred from Guantanamo, even though there was no evidence to justify laying charges against them. Khalaqi was one of the 55 individuals whose release the Task Force recommended.

== Transfer to Kazakhstan ==
On December 31, 2014, Khalaqi and four other men formerly detained at Guantanamo were transferred to Kazakhstan. Fox News pointed out to readers that al Khalaqi, and the other men, were the first individuals to be transferred to Kazakhstan. Fellow Yemenis (Muhammad Ali Husayn Khanayna and Sabri Mohammad al Qurashi), and Tunisians Adel Al-Hakeemy and Lotfi Bin Ali, were also transferred. Fox News noted that his 2007 JTF-GTMO assessment characterized him as a "medium risk". Reuters pointed out that the 2009 reviews by the Joint Review Task Force had reclassified all five men as "low risk".

National Public Radio pointed out that all the agencies with representatives on the Joint Review Task Force had unanimously agreed to release the five men.

Matt Spetalnick, of Reuters, noted that Khalaqi had denied claims from John Walker Lindh, "the American Taliban", that he had fought with al Qaeda.

Vice News described the men as only nominally being free. Lotfi Bin Ali, who was released to Kazakhstan at the same time as al-Khalaqi, and had been in regular contact with him via Skype, told Vice News that Kazakhstan security officials regularly inspected the former captives' living quarters, initially doing so almost every day:

"The police used to come almost every day to the apartment. They would open the door and enter and check the place for a minute or two, then they would leave... It's as if it's Guantanamo 2, to be honest."

Vice News reported that "In cooperation with the Kazakh government, the local chapter of the ICRC is charged with the care of the former detainees, and provides healthcare, food stipends, language classes, and transport."

== Death in Kazakhstan ==
On May 21, 2015, Claire Ward, writing in Vice News, reported that al-Khalaqi had been found dead in his sparsely furnished apartment in Kyzylorda, on May 7, 2015. Lotfi Bin Ali, who was released to Kazakhstan at the same time as al-Khalaqi, described al-Khalaqi frequently going into comas, in his cell, at Guantanamo, requiring Guantanamo medical personnel to rush to his aid. Prior to his autopsy, Kazakhstan authorities suspected he might have died from food poisoning, but his autopsy determined that he died of kidney failure, and also had a serious lung infection. On May 22, 2015, The Guardian quoted another friend of Khalaqi, Jihad Dhiab (recently transferred to Uruguay) regarding Khalaqi's cause of death.

Guantanamo spokesman Captain Tom Gresback told Vice News, "Every detainee is given a thorough health screening prior to transfer... The detainee would not have been transferred if he failed the health screening." His 2007 Joint Task Force Guantanamo detainee assessment described al-Khalaqi as being in "good health".
