= Anam v. Bush =

- Court: United States District Court for the District of Columbia
- Full case name: Suhail Abdu Anam, et al v. George W. Bush, et al.
- Docket nos.: 1:04-cv-01194

Case history
- Related actions: Boumediene v. Bush, 553 U.S. 723 (2008)

Court membership
- Judge sitting: Henry H. Kennedy

Anam v. Bush, No. 1:04-cv-01194, is a writ of habeas corpus filed on behalf of a dozen Guantanamo detainees. The petition was filed before US District Court Judge Henry H. Kennedy on July 14, 2004. It was one of over 200 habeas corpus petitions filed on behalf of detainees held in the Guantanamo Bay detention camp in Cuba.

== Details of the captives ==
Captives whose cases were amalgamated in Anam v. Bush
name	isn	notes
Ali Ahmed Mohammed Al Rezehi	045	His privileged habeas corpus documents were seized in June 2006, following the first successful suicides.
Ali Husayn Abdullah Al Tays	162	His privileged habeas corpus documents were seized in June 2006, following the first successful suicides.; Was repatriated in December 2006.
Ali Yahya Mahdi Al Raimi	167	His privileged habeas corpus documents were seized in June 2006, following the first successful suicides.
Saeed Ahmed Mohammed Al Sarim	235	His privileged habeas corpus documents were seized in June 2006, following the first successful suicides.
Khaled Ahmed Qassim Muse'd	242	His privileged habeas corpus documents were seized in June 2006, following the first successful suicides.
Riyad Atag Ali Abdoh Al Haj	256	His privileged habeas corpus documents were seized in June 2006, following the first successful suicides.
Abdul Khaleq Ahmed Sahleh Al-Baidhani	553	His privileged habeas corpus documents were seized in June 2006, following the first successful suicides.
Jalal Salim Bin Amer	564	His privileged habeas corpus documents were seized in June 2006, following the first successful suicides.
Suhail Abdoh Anam	569	His privileged habeas corpus documents were seized in June 2006, following the first successful suicides.; On 19 September 2008 Darold W. Killmer filed a "PETITIONER SUHAIL ABDU ANAM'S OPPOSITION TO RESPONDENTS' REQUEST FOR EXCEPTION FROM SEQUENCING" on behalf of Suhail Abdu Anam (ISN 569) in Civil Action No. 04-1194 (HHK). Anam's lawyers were objecting to the government's delay in filing a "factual return" in his case.
Abdualaziz Abdoh Abdullah Ali Al Swidhi	578	His privileged habeas corpus documents were seized in June 2006, following the first successful suicides.
Emad Abdullah Hassan	680	His privileged habeas corpus documents were seized in June 2006, following the first successful suicides.
Fahmi Abdullah Ahmed Al Tawlaqi	688	His privileged habeas corpus documents were seized in June 2006, following the first successful suicides.
Bashir Nasir Ali Al Marwalah	837	His privileged habeas corpus documents were seized in June 2006, following the first successful suicides.
Musa'ab Omar Al Mudwani	839	His privileged habeas corpus documents were seized in June 2006, following the first successful suicides.

== Military Commissions Act ==
The Military Commissions Act of 2006 mandated that Guantanamo captives were no longer entitled to access the US civil justice system, so all outstanding habeas corpus petitions were stayed.

== Boumediene v. Bush ==
On June 12, 2008, the United States Supreme Court ruled, in Boumediene v. Bush, that the Military Commissions Act of 2006 could not remove the right for Guantanamo captives to access the US Federal Court system and all previous Guantanamo captives' habeas petitions were eligible to be re-instated.
