= Al Odah v. Bush =

- Court: United States District Court for the District of Columbia
- Full case name: Fawzi Khalid Abdullah Fahad Al Odah, et al. v. United States of America
- Docket nos.: 1:02-cv-00828, consolidated with 1:02-cv-00299

Court membership
- Judge sitting: Colleen Kollar-Kotelly

Habeas corpus petition of Fouzi Khalid Abdullah Al Awda et al

Civil Action No. 02-cv-0299 is a habeas corpus petition submitted on behalf of several Guantanamo captives.

== Petitions incorporated in 02-cv-0299 ==
On July 26, 2004, US District Court Judge Colleen Kollar Kotelly incorporated several other habeas petitions with 02-cv-0299: Al Odah v. United States, 02cv828 (CKK); Mamdouh v. Bush, 02cv1130 (CKK); Kurnaz v. Bush, 04cv1135 (ESH); Khadr v. Bush, 04cv1136 (JDB); Begg v. Bush, 04cv1137 (RMC); Bechellali v. Bush, 04cv1142 (RJL); El-Banna v. Bush, 04cv1144 (RWR); Gherebi v. Bush, 04cv1164 (RBW); Boumediene v. Bush, 04cv1166 (RJL); Anam v. Bush, 04cv1194 (HHK).

Captives whose petitions were incorporated in 02-cv-0299 and were still present in Guantanamo in 2008
| isn | name | notes |
|---|---|---|
| 2 | David Hicks | The "Australian Taliban".; Nineteen pages of unclassified documents from his Combatant Status Review Tribunal have been published. |
| 38 | Ridah Bin Saleh Al Yazidi | 179 captives who had habeas petitions files on their behalf had a dossier of unclassified documents from their Combatant Status Review Tribunals published. But Al Yazidi's documents were withheld. The Bush administration has not offered an explanation as to why his documents were withheld.; On July 7, 2008 Brent N. Rushforth filed a "PETITIONER'S UNOPPOSED MOTION TO ENTER PROTECTIVE ORDER"' on behalf of Ridah Bin Saleh Al Yazidi.; Ridah Bin Saleh Al Yazidi v. George W. Bush used to be part of Civil Action No. 02-CV-0299, but is now listed as Civil Action No. 07-cv-2337. |

== Military Commissions Act ==
The Military Commissions Act of 2006 mandated that Guantanamo captives were no longer entitled to access the US civil justice system, so all outstanding habeas corpus petitions were stayed.

== Boumediene v. Bush ==
On June 12, 2008, the United States Supreme Court ruled, in Boumediene v. Bush, that the Military Commissions Act could not remove the right of Guantanamo captives to access the US Federal Court system. It ruled that all previous Guantanamo captives' habeas petitions were eligible to be re-instated.

The judges considering the captives' habeas petitions were to determine if the evidence supporting the allegations that the men and boys were enemy combatants justified a classification as "enemy combatant". If so, the determination implied that the person should continue to be detained.

== Eligible to seek relief ==
On July 3, 2008, US District Court Judge Thomas F. Hogan listed this habeas petition on a list where former captives were eligible to seek relief.
