= Dirty thirty (Guantanamo Bay Naval Base) =

A group of prisoners at the Guantanamo Bay detention camp, the Dirty Thirty were believed to be the "best potential sources of information" and consequently the chief focus of the harshest methods of interrogation. Many of these captives were alleged to be Osama bin Laden bodyguards, or associates of Osama bin Laden.

isn	name	notes
26	Fahed Abdullah Ahmad Ghazi	Alleged Osama bin Laden bodyguard.
30	Ahmed Umar Abdullah al Hikimi	The detainee's name along with other personal property information was found on a list recovered during raids against al Qaida associated safe houses.
32	Faruq Ali Ahmed	The Detainee was captured by Pakistani Forces as part of an organized group of 30 Mujhedeen after the fall of Tora Bora.
34	Al Khadr Abdallah Muhammed Al Yafi	The detainee's name was found on a list of 324 Arabic names, aliases and nationalities recovered from a safe house connected with suspected al Qaida in Pakistan.
38	Ridah Bin Saleh Al Yazidi	Allegedly captured with Osama bin Laden bodyguards.
39	Ali Hamza Ahmed Suleiman Al Bahlul	Described as "a major prize".; Alleged to have helped prepare a propaganda video about the USS Cole bombing.; One of the first captives to face charges before a Guantanamo military commission.
40	Abdel Qadir Hussein Al Mudhaffari	The detainee was a security guard for Usama Bin Laden.
53	Saud Dakhil Allah Muslih Al Mahayawi	Alleged Osama bin Laden bodyguard.
54	Ibrahim Ahmed Mahmoud al Qosi	Described as "a major prize".; One of the first captives to face charges before a Guantanamo military commission.
56	Abdullah Tabarak Ahmad	Described as a follower of Osama Bin Laden, who had worked for him in Sudan, and followed him to Afghanistan.; Repatriated to Morocco in 2004.
59	Sultan Ahmed Dirdeer Musa Al Uwaydha	
62	Muhamad Naji Subhi Al Juhani	The detainee's name was found on a chart listing the names of captured Mujahedin. The information was found on a hard drive associated with a senior al Qaida operative.
63	Mohammed al Qahtani	Described as "a major prize".; The Department of Defense acknowledged they subjected him to extended interrogation techniques, because he had tried to enter the USA in August 2001, and was suspected of being one of the dozen 20th hijackers. Many other sources described the treatment as torture. Those techniques included: Almost two months of sleep deprivation, where three shifts of interrogators kept him under interrogation 18 to 20 hours per day; Forced nudity; Force-feeding, forced uses of enemas, while under shackles, forced use of stimulants, and other drugs; Sexual humiliation; One of the successes asserted by DoD spokesmen was that al Qahtani identified thirty Osama bin Laden bodyguards during his extended interrogation. Al Qahtani has since recanted every denunciation he made under what he described as torture.; Originally faced charges before a Guantanamo military commission in February 2008 but all charges were dropped in May 2008.
68	Khalid Saud Abd Al Rahman Al Bawardi	
