= Lotfi Bin Ali =

Prisoner at centro de detencion de la bahia de Guantanamo

- Born: 1965; Tunis, Tunisia
- Died: 9 March 2021 (aged 55–56)
- Detained at: Guantanamo
- Other name: Abdullah Bin Ali al-Lutfi
- ISN: 894
- Charge(s): no charge, extrajudicial detention
- Status: Transferred to Kazakhstan, where subject died of natural causes

Lotfi Bin Ali (Arabic: لطفي بن علي; 1965 – 9 March 2021), also known as Abdullah Bin Ali al-Lutfi, was a Tunisian whom the United States held in extrajudicial detention for over thirteen years in the Guantanamo Bay detention camps, in Cuba. He was one of five men transferred to Kazakhstan in 2014. He was extensively quoted following the death, purportedly from lack of medical care, of one of the other captives transferred to Kazakhstan. In a September 2016 profile in The Guardian, he described exile in Kazakhstan as being very isolating, and, in some ways, almost as bad as Guantanamo.

== Health ==
A 2004 medical summary stated he had chronic heart disease that had required the placement of a mechanical heart valve; that he had kidney stones; latent tuberculosis, depression and high blood pressure. It stated he needed to have his blood tested, twice a month, to ensure he was receiving the right dose of anti-coagulants.

Vice magazine, who visited him in October 2015, ten and a half months after his transfer to Semey, Kazakhstan, said his local doctors didn't speak Arabic, and no translators were available. According to his Guantanamo weight records he was 76.5 inches (194 cm) tall, and weighed 225 pounds (102 kg) upon his arrival. His weight showed a sudden drop in late fall of 2005 and he weighed 218 pounds (99 kg) on November 27, 2005. On 10 December 2005, his weight had dropped to 192.5 pounds (87.3 kg). On both 12 & 13 December, his weight was recorded as exactly 173.4 pounds (78.7 kg). On 16 December, his weight was recorded as exactly 163.9 pounds (74.3 kg). By 29 December, his records showed he had gained 29 pounds (13 kg). By 27 January 2006, his weight had risen to 201.4 pounds (91.4 kg), and his weight oscillated around that weight for the rest of 2006. Lotfi Bin Ali died on 9 March 2021 from heart disease complications and inability to afford required surgery.

== Official status reviews ==
Originally, the George W. Bush administration asserted that captives apprehended in the "war on terror" were not covered by the Geneva Conventions, and could be held indefinitely, without charge, and without an open and transparent review of the justifications for their detention. In 2004, the United States Supreme Court ruled, in Rasul v. Bush, that Guantanamo captives were entitled to being informed of the allegations justifying their detention, and were entitled to try to refute them.

=== Office for the Administrative Review of Detained Enemy Combatants ===
Combatant Status Review Tribunals were held in a 3x5 meter trailer where the captive sat with his hands and feet shackled to a bolt in the floor.

Following the Supreme Court's ruling, the Department of Defense set up the Office for the Administrative Review of Detained Enemy Combatants.

Scholars at the Brookings Institution, led by Benjamin Wittes, listed the captives still held in Guantanamo in December 2008, according to whether their detention was justified by certain common allegations:

- Lotfi Bin Ali was listed as one of the captives whom the Wittes team were unable to identify as presently cleared for release or transfer.
- Lotfi Bin Ali was listed as one of the captives who "The military alleges ... are associated with both Al Qaeda and the Taliban."
- Lotfi Bin Ali was listed as one of the captives who "The military alleges that the following detainees stayed in Al Qaeda, Taliban or other guest- or safehouses."
- Lotfi Bin Ali was listed as one of the captives who "The military alleges ... took military or terrorist training in Afghanistan."
- Lotfi Bin Ali was listed as one of the captives who was a member of the "al Qaeda leadership cadre".
- Lotfi Bin Ali was listed as one of "two alleged Al Qaeda leaders who have been cleared for release or transfer."

=== Formerly secret Joint Task Force Guantanamo assessment ===
On 25 April 2011, the whistleblower organization WikiLeaks published formerly secret assessments drafted by Joint Task Force Guantanamo analysts. His two-page Joint Task Force Guantanamo assessment was drafted on June 27, 2004. It was signed by camp commandant Jay W. Hood. He recommended release due to Lotfi's serious health problems, but noted the Criminal Investigative Task Force regarded him as a high risk.

=== Cleared for release by the Guantanamo Joint Task Force ===
President Barack Obama enacted three Executive Orders pertaining to Guantanamo on the day he took office. Executive Order 13492 established a new review process for the remaining captive, one where those reviewing their status were senior officials representing several cabinet departments, including the Department of State, the Department of Homeland Security, the Department of Justice, and the Office of the Director of National Intelligence. Lotfi was cleared, yet again, by his review.

== Transfer to Kazakhstan ==
On 30 December 2014, Lotfi Bin Ali and four other men were transferred to Kazakhstan, where they were kept under onerous security conditions. Fox News said that Lotfi and the four other men were the first to be transferred to Kazakhstan. Carol Rosenberg, of the Miami Herald, noted that Lotfi Bin Ali arrived in Guantanamo with serious heart disease, and his transfer had first been recommended in 2004, because his heart disease made him a low risk. Three Yemenis (Asim Thabit Abdullah Al-Khalaqi, Muhammad Ali Husayn Khanayna and Sabri Mohammad al Qurashi) and a fellow Tunisian (Adel Al-Hakeemy), were also transferred. Reuters said that the 2009 reviews by the Joint Review Task Force had reclassified all five men as "low risk".

National Public Radio reported that all the agencies with representatives on the Joint Review Task Force had unanimously agreed to release the five men. Lotfi Bin Ali and fellow Tunisian Al Hakeemy were relocated to Semey, while the Yemenis were relocated to Kyzylorda, Kazakhstan.

Vice News described the men transferred to Kazakhstan as only nominally being free. Vice News interviewed

Lotfi Bin Ali shortly after 7 May 2015, death of his friend Asim Thabit Abdullah Al-Khalaqi, who was transferred to Kazakhstan at the same time he was. Lotfi Bin Ali had been in regular contact with him via Skype, and had last spoken to him just three days before his death. He told Vice News that Kazakhstan security officials regularly inspected the former captives' living quarters, initially doing so almost every day:

The police used to come almost every day to the apartment. They would open the door and enter and check the place for a minute or two, then they would leave... It's as if it's Guantanamo 2, to be honest.

Lotfi Bin Ali contradicted Guantanamo spokesmen, who claimed al Khalaqi would not have been transferred if his health was compromised—saying that al-Khalaqi regularly fell into comas at Guantanamo, needing prompt medical care. Al-Lofti said al Khalaqi had been hospitalized multiple times, in Kazakhstan, prior to his death. Vice News reported that "In cooperation with the Kazakh government, the local chapter of the ICRC is charged with the care of the former detainees, and provides healthcare, food stipends, language classes, and transport." Kazakhstan security officials routinely enter the men's homes without a warrant.

Vice magazine profiled Lotfi Bin Ali in October 2015. It reported Kazakh authorities still hadn't issued him with identity documents, meaning he had to rely the Red Crescent Society to manage his affairs.

Vice was able to accompany Lotfi Bin Ali to a meeting with Alfiya Meshina, head of the Semey office of the Red Crescent Society. She interrupted Lofti when he was talking about his health, reportedly saying:

I don't want to listen to this bullshit about his health problems. Since he arrived here on the 31st of December last year and until today, all we have been doing is taking care of his health... We have so many poor and elderly people, so many large families that live much worse than he does. What is he, a national hero of Kazakhstan? Why should he enjoy special treatment and privileges?

UNESCO reported in 2019 that Lotfi Bin Ali said he would prefer to live in actual detention in Guantanamo rather than in Kazakhstan.
