= Tunisian detainees at Guantanamo Bay =

Detainees in Guantanamo

The United States Department of Defense acknowledges holding Tunisian detainees in Guantanamo. A total of 779 detainees have been held in extrajudicial detention in the Guantanamo Bay detention camps, in Cuba since the camps opened on January 11, 2002 The camp population peaked in 2004 at approximately 660. Only nineteen new detainees, all "high value detainees" have been transferred there since the United States Supreme Court's ruling in Rasul v. Bush. As of January 6, 2025, 15 detainees remain at Guantanamo Bay. By July 2012 the camp held 168 captives.

On February 24, 2010, Carol Rosenberg, of the Miami Herald, reported that Albania accepted the transfer of three former detainees, a Tunisian, Saleh Bin Hadi Asasi and Sharif Fati Ali al Mishad and Rauf Omar Mohammad Abu al Qusin, an Egyptian, and a Libyan. The men will not be allowed to leave Albania.

On July 27, 2012, Tunisia Live asserted the five remaining Tunisian captives would be repatriated by the end of 2012.

Previously, the risk of torture under the Ben Ali regime meant the five Tunisian detainees could not safely return home. Now, with Tunisia's democratic transition in full effect, there is nothing to prevent these Tunisian citizens returning to their country.

== Tunisian detainees in Guantanamo ==
isn	name	arrival date	departure date	notes
38	Ridah Bin Saleh Al Yazidi	2002-01-11	2024-12-30	
46	Salah Bin Al Hadi Asasi	2002-01-20	2010-02-24	Transferred to Albania
148	Adel Ben Mabrouk	2002-02-09	2009-11-30	Transferred to Italy for criminal prosecution
168	Adel bin Ibrahim Hkiml		2014-12-30	Transferred to Kazakhstan
174	Hisham Sliti	2002-05-01	2014-11-20	Transferred to Slovakia
502	Abdul Bin Mohammed Bin Abess Ourgy	2002-05-01	2014-12-08	granted asylum in Uruguay
510	Riyad Bil Mohammed Tahir Nasseri	2002-06-08	2009-11-30	Transferred to Italy for criminal prosecution
660	Lufti Bin Swei Lagha	2002-06-14	2007-06-17	
717	Abdul Haddi Bin Hadiddi	2002-08-05	2010-03-23	Transferred to Georgia
721	Abdullah Bin Omar	2002-08-05	2007-06-17	
892	Rafiq Bin Bashir Bin Jalud Al Hami	2003-02-07	2010-01-24	Transferred to Slovakia
894	Lufti Bin Ali	2003-02-07	2014-12-30	Transferred to Kazakhstan
