= Lazhar Ben Mohamed Tlil =

- Born: 1969 (age 56–57); Tunis
- Occupation: drug dealer
- Known for: a petty criminal, in Italy, who attended an Afghan training camp, who agreed to testify against Tunisians captives in Guantanamo

Lazhar Ben Mohamed Tlil is a citizen of Tunis, and longtime resident of Italy. After traveling to Italy Tlil committed petty crimes to support a drug habit.

During a period when he was trying to quit his addiction to drugs Tlil traveled to Afghanistan, and received some military training at an Afghan training camp. Upon his return to Italy Tlil returned to crime, and was caught, convicted and sentenced, for petty drug dealing. After al Qaeda's attacks on the Continental United States, on September 11, 2001, his attendance at the Afghan training camp became of acute interest to American security officials. When Italian prison officials allowed American security officials to interrogate him Tlil was able to identify several other Tunisians who were being held in Guantanamo.

Tlil initially agreed to testify against individuals in Guantanamo, either in Italy, or in the United States. Tlil was released in return for his agreement to testify, and was placed in the Italian version of a witness protection program. When Adel Ben Mabrouk and Mohamed Ben Riadh Nasri, two Tunisians who also had a record of committing petty crimes in Italy, who had been captured in Afghanistan, and had spent seven years in extrajudicial detention in Guantanamo, were transferred to Italy, Italian prosecutor Elio Ramondini said it would be "impossible" to convict them without Tlil's testimony.

According to reports from the Associated Press, from November and December 2009, while Lazhar had been willing to serve as a witness against the men, he had recently indicated that he might no longer cooperate, because he is unhappy with how Italy's witness protection program is administered.

The Associated Press reported he was also being considered as a possible witness against some of the senior al Qaeda captives who were then expected to face trial in the USA.

In 2012 Tlil was profiled in the news again, as a vocal critic of Italy's witness protection program.
