= Amin al-Haq =

Afghan national and a trained doctor

- Born: Amin Muhammad Ul Haq Saam Khan; 1960 (age 65–66)
- Occupations: Doctor, Former bodyguard and security coordinator for Osama bin Laden
- Known for: Being a former bodyguard and security coordinator for Osama bin Laden. Believed to have escaped from Tora Bora with Osama bin Laden.
- Criminal status: Arrested in July 2024 during a raid by the Counter Terrorism Department in Sarai Alamgir, Punjab, Pakistan.

Amin Muhammad Ul Haq Saam Khan (born 1960) is an Afghan national and a trained doctor. He is reported to have been a former Osama bin Laden bodyguard and a security coordinator. Haq is believed to have escaped from Tora Bora with Osama bin Laden.

== Arrests ==
=== 2008 arrest ===
Haq was reported to have been captured in Lahore, Pakistan, in early January 2008. He was released from Pakistani custody in September 2011 citing a lack of evidence. Pakistani officials stated that Haq's connections to al Qaeda "could not be proved," and he is also "not in good health." CBS News and NPR cited Haq's release was a trigger for challenges of Pakistan's commitment to fight terrorism. However, British daily The Telegraph cites a senior Pakistani security official, who told the paper Haq was "arrested mistakenly, therefore, the police failed to prove any charge of his association with Osama bin Laden and the court set him free." Analyst Rahimullah Yusufzai speculated, "They could only have released him with the say so of America or if maybe there really was no evidence or he was not that important."

In late August 2021, Haq publicly returned to Nangarhar province, Afghanistan, hailed by his entourage, in clandestinity no more.

=== 2024 arrest ===
Haq was arrested in July 2024 during a raid by the Counter Terrorism Department in Sarai Alamgir, Punjab, Pakistan. According to the police, he was planning attacks in the Punjab province before his arrest.
