= Adel al-Gazzar =

Adel Fattough Ali Al Gazzar عادل الجزار
- Born: October 12, 1965 (age 61); Cairo, Egypt
- Detained at: Guantanamo
- ISN: 369
- Status: Transferred to Slovakia

Adel Fattough Ali Al Gazzar (Arabic: عادل الجزار) is a citizen of Egypt formerly held in the United States Guantanamo Bay detainment camps, in Cuba. The Department of Defense reports that he was born on October 22, 1965, in Cairo, Egypt.

After approximately eight years in Guantanamo, he was transferred to Slovakia in January 2010. In June, he declared his intention to go on a hunger strike to protest conditions there.

== Background ==
According to his lawyers Gazzar worked for the Saudi Red Crescent, and was injured during his one and only visit to Afghanistan to deliver humanitarian aid. He claimed sympathetic Pakistani dignitaries visited him in the Pakistani hospital where his wounds were treated, but that he was nevertheless falsely denounced and sold to the US for a bounty.

He was first held in a U.S prison in Kandahar where he according to lawyers "was subject to severe beatings, exposure to freezing temperatures, sleep deprivation for days on end, and suspension by the wrists."

He was injured during the American aerial bombardment of Afghanistan, and had his leg amputated above the knee by Guantanamo medical staff after i had become gangrenous from lack of care.

He stood accused of training and fighting in Kashmir.

== Adel Fattough Ali Algazzar v. George W. Bush ==
A writ of habeas corpus, Adel Fattough Ali Algazzar v. George W. Bush, was submitted on Adel Fattough Al Algazzar's behalf. In response the Department of Defense published 37 pages of unclassified documents related to his Combatant Status Review Tribunal.

On October 29, 2004, Tribunal panel 15 confirmed his "enemy combatant" status.

== Press reports ==
On July 12, 2006 the magazine Mother Jones provided excerpts from the transcripts of a selection of the Guantanamo detainees. Al Gazzar was one of the detainees profiled. According to the article his transcript contained the following exchange:

algazzar: I am disappointed with this tribunal because if I am in a court and you accuse me of anything I should be allowed to know what the accusations are and to see the evidence. You tell me that these accusations are unclassified but there are other classified accusations. How can I defend myself if I don’t know what the evidence is about the other accusations?...

tribunal member: If I can clarify a little bit before you start. These are all the accusations. What we will get in the classified session is in theory evidence to support these accusations, but there are no other accusations against you besides what is listed here.

algazzar: I understand that but what I mean is if you say I am an enemy combatant and you say you have evidence, I don’t get to see it. Then I will stay here….

tribunal member: Do you have any theories about why the government and the Pakistani intel folks would sell you out and turn you over to the Americans?

algazzar: Come on, man, you know what happened. In Pakistan you can buy people for $10. So what about $5,000?

tribunal member: So they sold you?

algazzar: Yes.

Canadian journalist, and former special assistant to US President George W. Bush, David Frum, published an article based on his own reading of the transcripts from the Combatant Status Review Tribunals, on November 11, 2006. It was Frum who coined the term "Axis of evil" for use in a speech he wrote for Bush. Al Gazzar's transcript was one of the nine Frum briefly summarized. His comment on Al Gazzar was:

A former Egyptian army officer acknowledged that he had undergone training in Afghanistan at a camp run by the Kashiri group, Lashkar-i-Taibi. However, he said, he had been listening to the BBC in February 2001 and heard an announcer describe LiT as a terrorist organization. After that, he said, he quit the group and had never had anything to do with them again. How had he supported himself in Afghanistan over the following year? He had, he said, relied on charity from his fellow Muslims.

Frum came to the conclusion that all nine of the men whose transcript he summarized had obviously lied. He did not, however, state how he came to the conclusion they lied. His article concluded with the comment:

But what’s the excuse of those in the West who succumb so easily to the deceptions of terrorists who cannot invent even half-way plausible lies?
