= Kyzylorda =

City in Kyzylorda Region, Kazakhstan

Kyzylorda Қызылорда / Qyzylorda (Kazakh)
- City
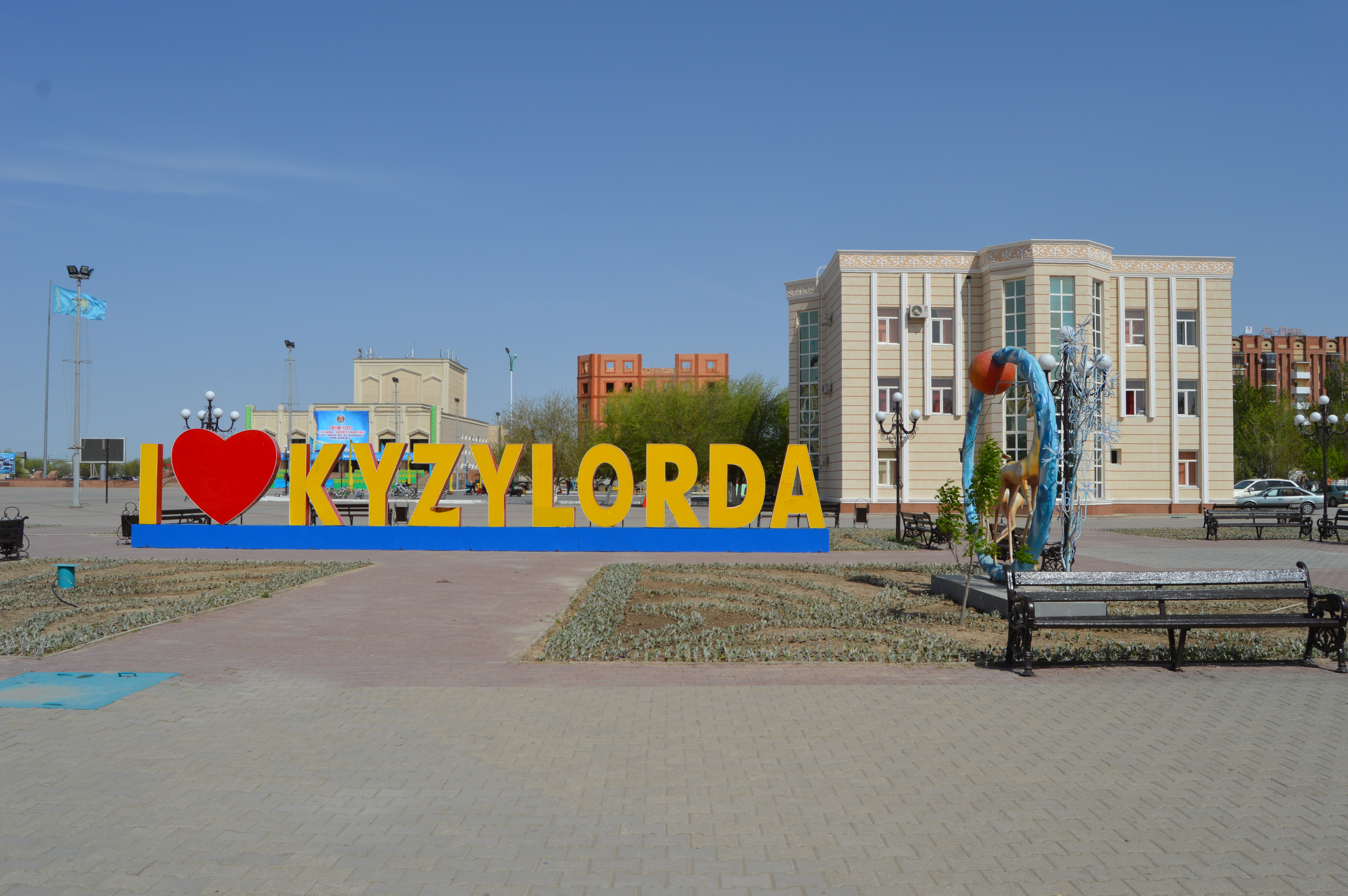
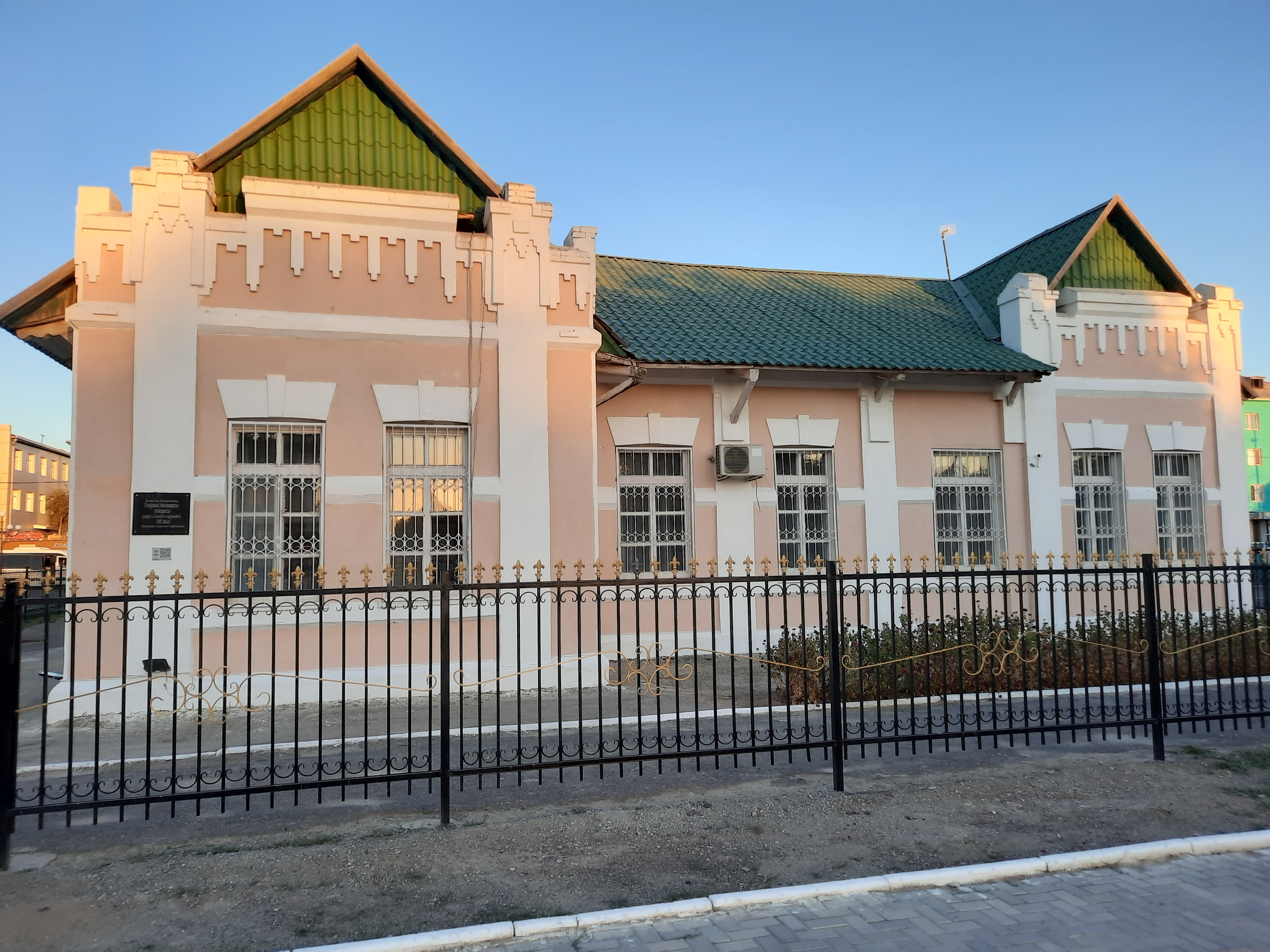
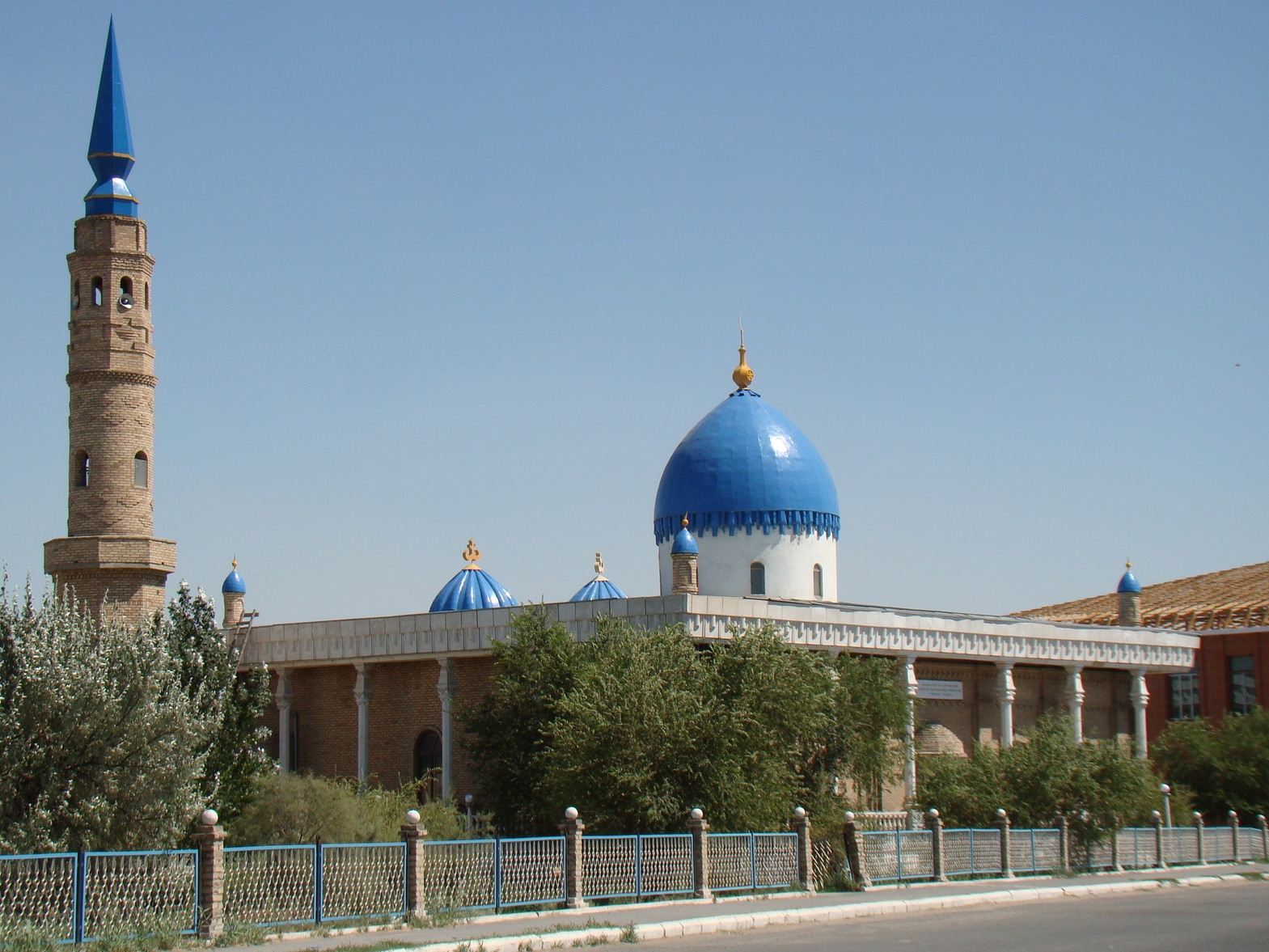
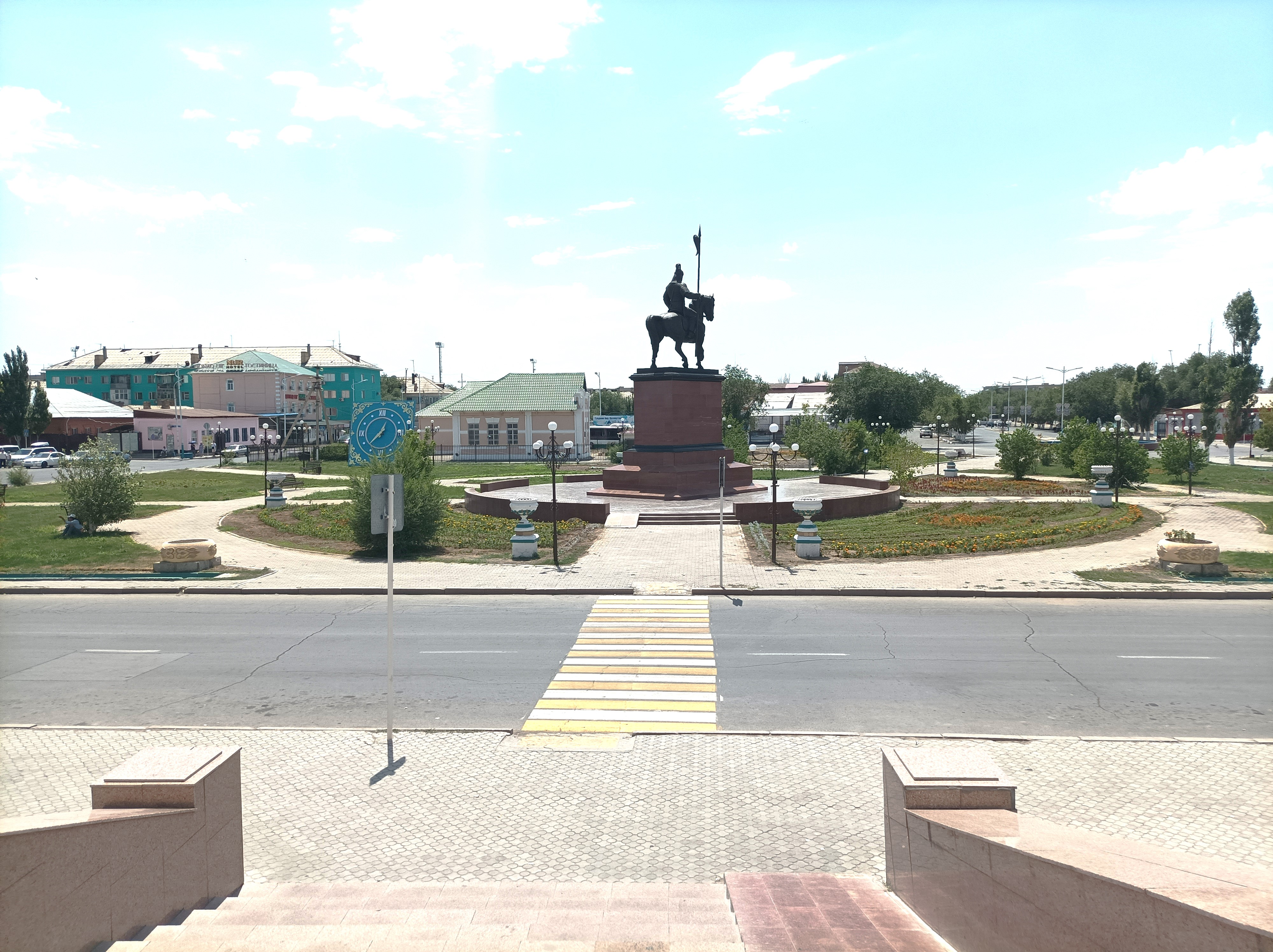
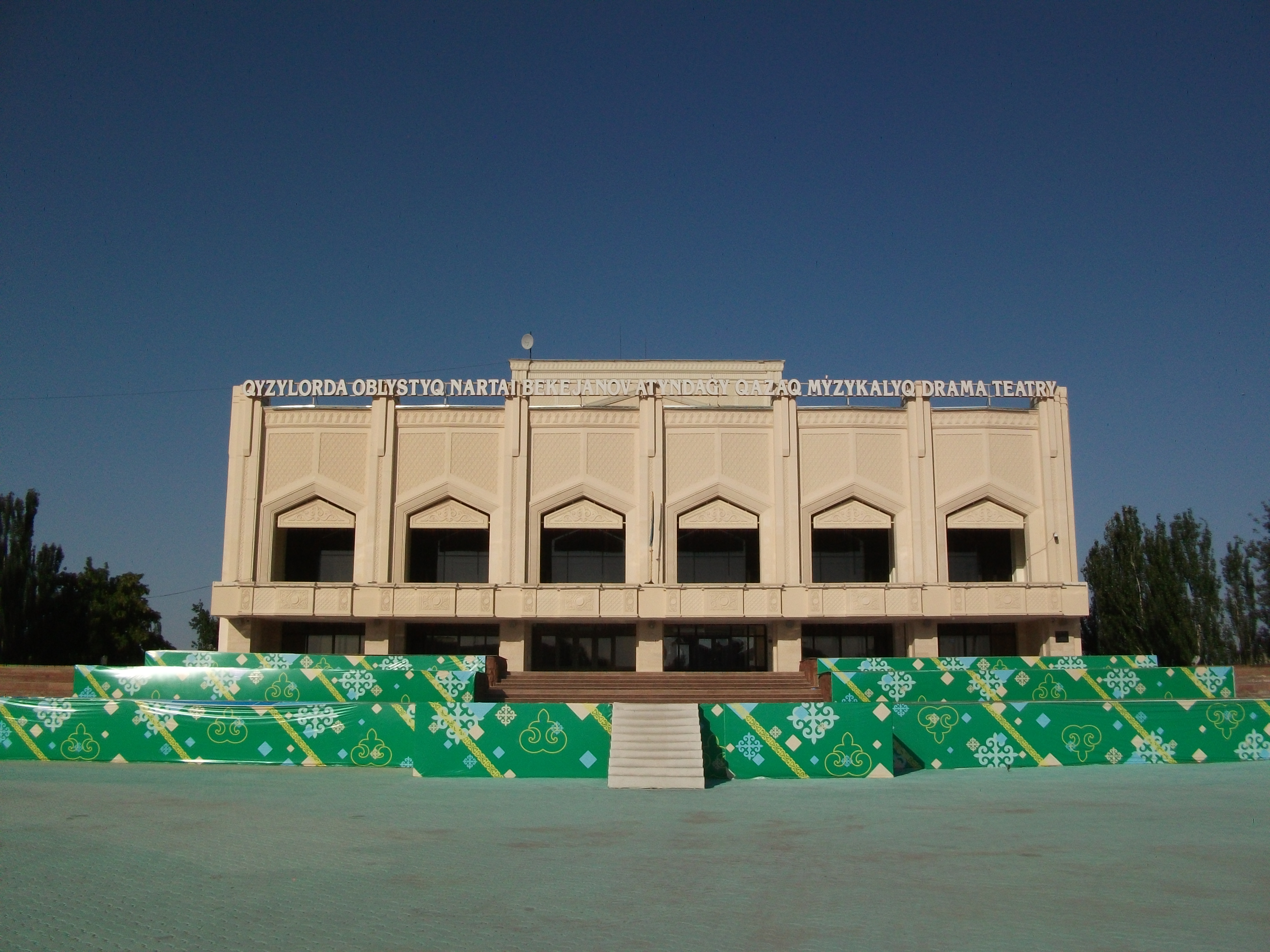
- Central square Ak-Mechet Museum Aitbay Mosque Zhankozha Nurmukhamedov monument Kazakh Academic Music and Drama Theater

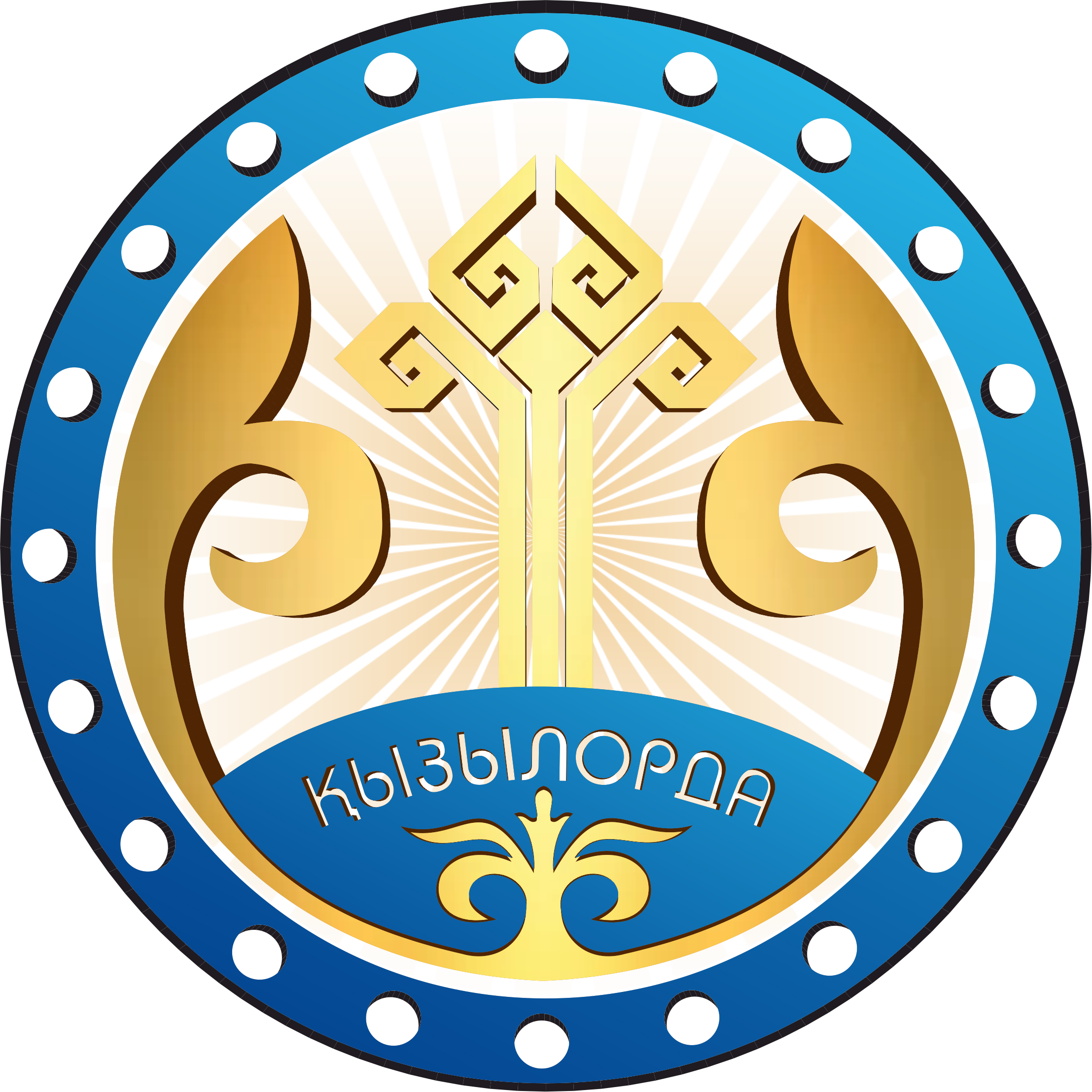
- Seal

- Location in Kazakhstan
- Coordinates: 44°51′0″N 65°31′0″E
- Country: Kazakhstan
- Region: Kyzylorda Region
- Founded: 1820
- City status: 1867

Government
  - Akim (mayor): Nurzhan Akhatov

Area
  - Total: 2,400 km^{2} (930 sq mi)
- Elevation: 128 m (420 ft)

Population (2019)
  - Total: 354,800
  - Density: 150/km^{2} (380/sq mi)
- Time zone: UTC+5
- Postal codes: 120001–120018
- Area code: +7 7242
- Vehicle registration: N or 11
- Website: www.kyzylorda.gov.kz

Kyzylorda is a city in south-central Kazakhstan, capital of Kyzylorda Region and former capital of the Kazakh ASSR from 1925 to 1927.

The city has a population of 242,462 (2020). It historically developed around the Syr Darya river and was the site of a Kokand fortress. The population of the city with nearby villages is 312,861 (2020).

== History ==
A settlement existed under Seljuk, the founder of the Seljuk dynasty. The modern city began in 1817 as the site of a Kokand fortress known as Ak-Mechet, or white mosque. The later-famous Yaqub Beg was once the fort's commander, but he was not in command during the final battle. In 1853, during the Russian conquest of Turkestan, the fort was taken by Russian troops under General Vasily Perovsky. The Russians established a new fort and called it Fort-Perovsky (Форт-Перо́вский), after the general. The town of Perovsk (Перо́вск) in Russian Turkestan later developed around the fort. It was granted city status in 1867.

Soviet power in the city was first established in October 1917. In 1922, the name Ak-Mechet was restored. In 1925, the city was renamed Kzyl-Orda (Кзыл-Орда). The name means a red city, from the Turkic "кзыл" (red; used here in the common Soviet ideological connotation) and the Turkic Mongolian "орда" (city). In 1925, the capital of the Kazakh ASSR was relocated to Kzyl-Orda from Orynbor. In 1926, the Kazakh Drama Theater was established in the city. In 1927, the capital was relocated to Alma-Ata. In 1928, the Kyzylorda State Archive was founded, whose collections include documents from the period when Kyzylorda was the Kazakh capital. In 1937, the Kyzylorda State University was founded. In 1938, the city became the capital of the newly established Kyzylorda Region.

"Kyzylorda", the Kazakh-based Romanized spelling, has been used since the late 20th century after the dissolution of the Soviet Union and Kazakhstan's independence in 1991.

Since independence, many of the outhouses were erected in several apartment buildings used as dormitories during Soviet rule due to a lack of sewage systems for indoor plumbing. A RFE/RL report in April 2018 stated that the Kazakh Republic government was planning to modernize Soviet-era buildings.

== Agriculture ==
Kyzylorda is known for its rice production. Many hundreds of hectares are devoted to rice production. Two rice mills operate in the city.

== Climate ==
Kyzylorda has a cold desert climate (Köppen climate classification BWk) with hot summers and cold winters. Precipitation is low throughout the year, particularly in the summer months. Snow is common, though light, in winter. The lowest temperature on record is −36.1 °C (−33.0 °F), recorded in February 1969, and the former highest temperature was 46.0 °C (114.8 °F), recorded on July 7, 1975, with the current record high temperature of 46.5 °C (115.7 °F) being recorded on July 7, 2021.

Climate data for Kyzylorda (1991–2020, extremes 1856–present)
| Month | Jan | Feb | Mar | Apr | May | Jun | Jul | Aug | Sep | Oct | Nov | Dec | Year |
|---|---|---|---|---|---|---|---|---|---|---|---|---|---|
| Record high °C (°F) | 16.8 (62.2) | 23.9 (75.0) | 31.9 (89.4) | 39.3 (102.7) | 43.3 (109.9) | 44.6 (112.3) | 46.5 (115.7) | 44.7 (112.5) | 42.0 (107.6) | 35.7 (96.3) | 26.0 (78.8) | 18.2 (64.8) | 46.5 (115.7) |
| Mean daily maximum °C (°F) | −2.5 (27.5) | 0.8 (33.4) | 10.4 (50.7) | 20.9 (69.6) | 28.2 (82.8) | 33.6 (92.5) | 35.1 (95.2) | 33.4 (92.1) | 26.6 (79.9) | 18.1 (64.6) | 7.1 (44.8) | −0.5 (31.1) | 17.6 (63.7) |
| Daily mean °C (°F) | −6.8 (19.8) | −4.5 (23.9) | 4.0 (39.2) | 14.0 (57.2) | 21.1 (70.0) | 26.7 (80.1) | 28.3 (82.9) | 26.2 (79.2) | 19.0 (66.2) | 10.6 (51.1) | 1.7 (35.1) | −4.9 (23.2) | 11.3 (52.3) |
| Mean daily minimum °C (°F) | −10.6 (12.9) | −9.1 (15.6) | −1.4 (29.5) | 7.3 (45.1) | 13.8 (56.8) | 19.2 (66.6) | 21.0 (69.8) | 18.9 (66.0) | 11.7 (53.1) | 4.2 (39.6) | −2.8 (27.0) | −8.5 (16.7) | 5.3 (41.5) |
| Record low °C (°F) | −33.0 (−27.4) | −36.1 (−33.0) | −26.0 (−14.8) | −12.2 (10.0) | −0.8 (30.6) | 7.2 (45.0) | 7.8 (46.0) | 6.0 (42.8) | −1.0 (30.2) | −12.6 (9.3) | −25.1 (−13.2) | −31.0 (−23.8) | −36.1 (−33.0) |
| Average precipitation mm (inches) | 18.4 (0.72) | 14.2 (0.56) | 14.9 (0.59) | 19.8 (0.78) | 18.8 (0.74) | 8.1 (0.32) | 5.1 (0.20) | 3.1 (0.12) | 2.9 (0.11) | 9.1 (0.36) | 15.8 (0.62) | 16.4 (0.65) | 146.6 (5.77) |
| Average precipitation days (≥ 1 mm) | 4.6 | 3.6 | 3.5 | 3.6 | 3.2 | 2.0 | 1.1 | 0.7 | 0.6 | 2.1 | 3.7 | 4.3 | 33 |
| Average rainy days | 4 | 4 | 6 | 6 | 6 | 4 | 3 | 2 | 2 | 5 | 6 | 5 | 53 |
| Average snowy days | 12 | 9 | 4 | 0.2 | 0.03 | 0 | 0 | 0 | 0 | 0.4 | 3 | 9 | 38 |
| Average relative humidity (%) | 78 | 74 | 65 | 49 | 41 | 35 | 34 | 34 | 40 | 52 | 70 | 77 | 54 |
| Mean monthly sunshine hours | 111.6 | 144.1 | 204.6 | 252.0 | 347.2 | 375.0 | 424.7 | 375.1 | 327.0 | 238.7 | 150.0 | 111.6 | 3,061.6 |
| Mean daily sunshine hours | 3.6 | 5.1 | 6.6 | 8.4 | 11.2 | 12.5 | 13.7 | 12.1 | 10.9 | 7.7 | 5.0 | 3.6 | 8.4 |
Source 1: Pogoda.ru.net
Source 2: Deutscher Wetterdienst (sun)

== Education ==
The central square of Kyzylorda with Courthouse and Korkyt Ata Kyzylorda State University. 2026

Kyzylorda State University (KSU) after Korkyt ata is the leading center of education, a science and culture center in the Aral region of the Republic Kazakhstan. Established in 1950, the university trains highly skilled specialists in 54 specialties at 11 faculties.

== Transportation ==
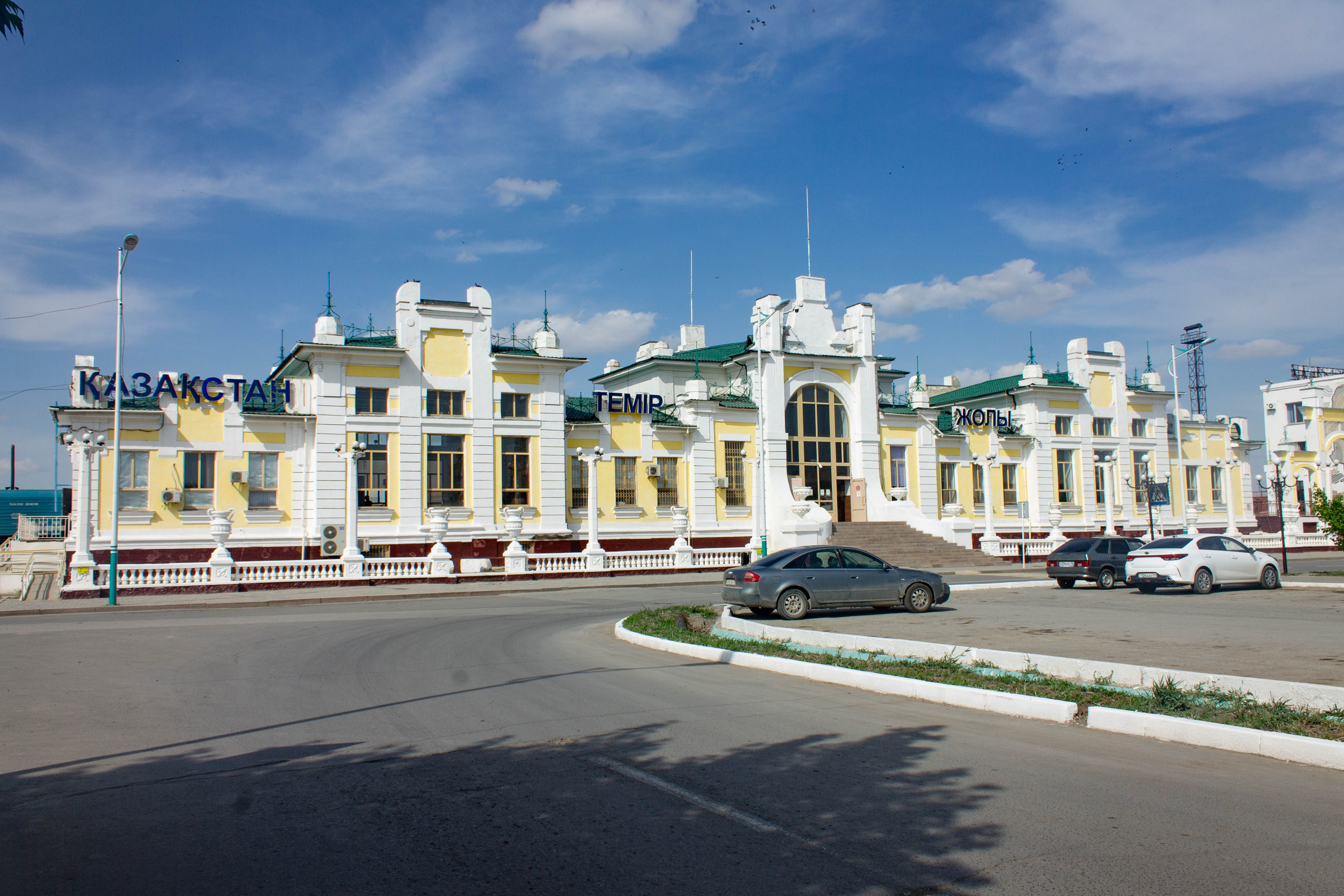
Main train station

Kyzylorda has one airport. It has developed as the supply center of the important oilfields in the nearby Turgay Basin.

== Tourism ==
Points of interest for tourists in the Kyzylorda region include the vanished Aral Sea and the Baikonur cosmodrome, archaeological excavations in Sauran and Shyganak, the memorial complex of Korkyt Ata, and several ancient mausoleums.

== Notable people ==
- Asim Thahit Abdullah Al Khalaqi (1968–2015), Yemeni formerly held in Guantanamo, given asylum by Kazakhstan in 2015
- Vladimir Hotineanu (1950–2019), former Health Minister of Moldova
- Eliezer Kulas (born 1944), Israeli politician
- Oleg Tozoni (1927–2012), engineer and inventor
- Marina Volnova (born 1989), Olympic boxer
- Ilya Ilyin (born 1988), Olympic weightlifter
- Batyrkhan Shukenov (1962–2015), Soviet, Kazakh-Russian singer
- Mihhail Kõlvart (born 1977), Estonian politician

== Twin towns – sister cities ==
Kyzylorda is twinned with:

- Arvada, United States
- Bolu, Turkey
- Bursa, Turkey
