= Islamic Cultural Institute (Milan) =

Islamic organization based in Italy

Coordinates: 45°29′48.87″N 9°10′30.31″E

The Islamic Cultural Institute in Milan, Italy was shut down by Italian authorities, based on an association with terrorism according to counter-terror analysts at the Guantanamo Bay detention camps in Cuba. However, in 2008 it was functioning again. The current president of the institute, as well as the associated mosque, is Abdel Hamid Shaari.
