= Zachary Philip Katznelson =

Lawyer, activist

Zachary Katznelson is an American-British lawyer and currently the Executive Director of the Independent Rikers Commission. He was formerly Legal Director for the human rights group Reprieve.

Katznelson and his colleagues represented over 50 people imprisoned in Guantanamo Bay. He has written numerous newspaper op-eds and was frequently quoted in the British press.

== Comments on Guantanamo captives' cases ==
The BBC News quoted Katznelson's comments following the release of Bisher Al Rawi:

So it was misinformation that started this chain of events, though unfortunately that led to him first being taken by the CIA to Afghanistan to an underground prison of 24-hour darkness with rats everywhere, to then being taken to Guantanamo – and it took years to right this wrong. Right to the end they treated him with brutality, on the way to the plane in Guantanamo – they knew he was leaving – they insisted still on shackling him, blindfolding him, putting on earmuffs so he couldn't hear a thing and keeping him in the back of a very hot, very confined van on the way to the plane.

On 6 September 2009, Katznelson made what The Guardian characterised as "extraordinary claims" on behalf of his client Shaker Aamer.

He repeated accounts Aamer had offered him of severe abuse during his initial interrogations in the Bagram Theater Internment Facility. Aamer claimed some of the interrogators who abused him in Bagram, in early 2002, represented themselves as MI5 officers. Aamer told him about feeling terrified as he recovered from one stunning beating that his interrogators had left him alone in a room with a pistol on the table. Aamer told him that the interrogators who represented themselves as MI5 officers offered him a choice. If he agreed to spy on suspected jihadists living in the UK he could be released to the United Kingdom. Alternatively he could remain indefinitely American custody. Commenting on Aamer's report that he had been left alone with a gun Katznelson said:

The interrogators at the time were clearly making it up as they went along. He [Aamer] didn't know what to make of it. He was absolutely terrified. He'd been abused and then he was left alone with a gun. You can't get more abusive than that.

Commenting on Aamer's report that MI5 had tried to recruit him as a spy Katznelson said:

You wouldn't make that offer to someone you thought was dangerous. It wouldn't make sense from a security perspective.
