= Musab Omar Ali Al Mudwani =

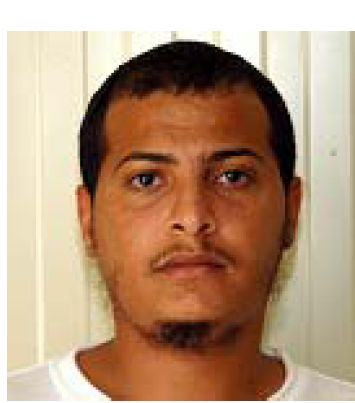
- Born: 1980 (age 45–46); Al-Hudaydah, Yemen
- Arrested: 2002-09-11; Karachi; Pakistani security officials, CIA
- Detained at: Dark prison, Guantanamo
- Other names: Musab Omar Ali al Mudwani; Musab Omarali al Mudwani
- ISN: 839
- Status: Transferred to Oman on January 16, 2017

Musab Omar Ali Al Mudwani is a citizen of Yemen who was held in extrajudicial detention in the United States Guantanamo Bay detainment camps, in Cuba.

Joint Task Force Guantanamo analysts estimated Al Madoonee was born in 1980 in Al-Hudaydah, Yemen.

The United States Senate Intelligence Committee report on CIA torture listed Al Mudwani as one of the individual held in the CIA's secret network of black sites. Musab Al Mudwani was apprehended by a combined force of Pakistani security officials and a CIA black site team, on September 11, 2002, the anniversary of al Qaeda's attack within the USA. He and five other individuals spent slightly more than a month in CIA custody at the salt pit, prior to being transferred to Guantanamo. Guantanamo analysts maintained the narrative that these six were an al Qaeda sleeper cell they called the "Karachi Six". However, that claim had been dropped by his 2016 Periodic Review Board hearing. Mudwani was transferred to Oman on January 16, 2017.

== Official status reviews ==
Originally, the Bush Presidency asserted that captives apprehended in the war on terror were not covered by the Geneva Conventions, and could be held indefinitely, without charge, and without an open and transparent review of the justifications for their detention. In 2004, the United States Supreme Court ruled, in Rasul v. Bush, that Guantanamo captives were entitled to being informed of the allegations justifying their detention, and were entitled to try to refute them.

=== Office for the Administrative Review of Detained Enemy Combatants ===
Combatant Status Review Tribunals were held in a 3x5 meter trailer where the captive sat with his hands and feet shackled to a bolt in the floor.

Following the Supreme Court's ruling the Department of Defense set up the Office for the Administrative Review of Detained Enemy Combatants.

Scholars at the Brookings Institution, led by Benjamin Wittes, listed the captives still held in Guantanamo in December 2008, according to whether their detention was justified by certain common allegations:

- Musab Omar Ali Al Mudwani was listed as one of the captives who "The military alleges ... are members of Al Qaeda."
- Musab Omar Ali Al Mudwani was listed as one of the captives who '"The military alleges ... traveled to Afghanistan for jihad."
- Musab Omar Ali Al Mudwani was listed as one of the captives who "The military alleges that the following detainees stayed in Al Qaeda, Taliban or other guest- or safehouses."
- Musab Omar Ali Al Mudwani was listed as one of the captives who "The military alleges ... took military or terrorist training in Afghanistan."
- Musab Omar Ali Al Mudwani was listed as one of the captives who "The military alleges that the following detainees were captured under circumstances that strongly suggest belligerency."
- Musab Omar Ali Al Mudwani was listed as one of the captives who was an "al Qaeda operative".
- Musab Omar Ali Al Mudwani was listed as one of the captives who "deny affiliation with Al Qaeda or the Taliban yet admit facts that, under the broad authority the laws of war give armed parties to detain the enemy, offer the government ample legal justification for its detention decisions."
- Musab Omar Ali Al Mudwani was listed as one of the captives who had admitted "fighting on behalf of Al Qaeda or the Taliban."

=== Habeas corpus petition ===
Al Mudwani had a writ of habeas corpus filed on his behalf. Historian Andy Worthington reported that when his petition was finally considered in December 2009, it was turned down, even though he had been a '"model prisoner"'.
