= Adel Ben Mabrouk =

Citizen of Tunisia held at the United States' Guantanamo Bay detainment camps

- Adel Ben Mabrouk's Guantanamo detainee assessment
- Born: September 15, 1970; Tunis, Tunisia
- Detained at: Guantanamo
- Other names: Adil Mabrouk Boughanmi Bin Hamida; Adel Ben Mabrouk Bin Hamida Boughanmi; Adil Mabrouk Bin Hamida
- ISN: 148
- Charge(s): No charge, extrajudicial detention
- Status: Transferred to Italy

Adel Ben Mabrouk (born September 15, 1970) is a citizen of Tunisia who was held in extrajudicial detention at the United States' Guantanamo Bay detainment camps, in Cuba, from March 2002 to November 2009. Mabrouk had outstanding warrants in Italy, and shortly after his arrival in November 2009, Italian prosecutors laid charges against him.

Although Mabrouk was convicted by a Milan court in February 2011, of criminal association with terrorist intent, the judge set him free, after sentencing him to time served, and denouncing detention in Guantanamo as "inhumane" and "not democratic".

== Allegation that Makbrouk "returned to terrorism" ==
On August 17, 2016, Libyan officials announced that, a few days earlier, they had captured an individual named Moez Ben Abdulgader Ben Ahmed Al Fezzani, who was reported as being a "top ISIS leader", and Tunisia's "most wanted terrorist". On August 20, 2016, some American media, including Fox News, reported that the captured man was an individual formerly held in Guantanamo.

Libyan officials said the captured man was born in Tunis—the same birthplace DoD officials listed for Mabrouk—but they said he was born in 1969, while Mabrouk was born in 1970.

== Official status reviews ==
Originally the Bush presidency asserted that captives apprehended in the "war on terror" were not covered by the Geneva Conventions, and could be held indefinitely, without charge, and without an open and transparent review of the justifications for their detention. In 2004 the United States Supreme Court ruled, in Rasul v. Bush, that Guantanamo captives were entitled to being informed of the allegations justifying their detention, and were entitled to try to refute them.

=== Office for the Administrative Review of Detained Enemy Combatants ===
Combatant Status Review Tribunals were held in a 3 × 5 meter trailer where the captive sat with his hands and feet shackled to a bolt in the floor.

Following the Supreme Court's ruling the Department of Defense set up the Office for the Administrative Review of Detained Enemy Combatants.

Scholars at the Brookings Institution, led by Benjamin Wittes, listed the captives still held in Guantanamo in December 2008, according to whether their detention was justified by certain common allegations:

- Adil Mabrouk Bin Hamida was listed as one of the captives who the Wittes team unable to identify as presently cleared for release or transfer.
- Adil Mabrouk Bin Hamida was listed as one of the captives who "The military alleges ... are associated with Al Qaeda."
- Adil Mabrouk Bin Hamida was listed as one of the captives who "The military alleges that the following detainees stayed in Al Qaeda, Taliban or other guest- or safehouses."
- Adil Mabrouk Bin Hamida was listed as one of the captives who was an "al Qaeda operative".
- Adil Mabrouk Bin Hamida was listed as one of the "34 [captives] admit to some lesser measure of affiliation—like staying in Taliban or Al Qaeda guesthouses or spending time at one of their training camps."
- Adil Mabrouk Bin Hamida was listed as one of the captives who had "stayed at Taliban or Al Qaeda guesthouses".
- Adil Mabrouk Bin Hamida was listed as one of the captives who had admitted "some form of associational conduct".

Mabrouk attended his Combatant Status Review Tribunal, where he disputed

Mabrouk attended his Combatant Status Review Tribunal.

=== Habeas petition ===
Mabrouk filed a habeas corpus petition which was ruled moot by the US District Court in July 2008

== Transfer from Guantanamo ==
On November 30, 2009, Bin Hamida and fellow detainee, Riyad Bil Mohammed Tahir Nasseri, were transferred from Guantanamo into the custody of representatives of Italy. Both men face outstanding warrants in that country, including new terrorism charges.

== Trial in Italy ==
Shortly after his arrival in Italy it emerged that his conviction would depend almost totally on the testimony of another Tunisian man, living in Italy, a criminal named Lazhar Ben Mohamed Tlil. Italian prosecutor Elio Ramondini said it would be "impossible" to convict him without Tlil's testimony. Tlil threatened to withhold his testimony. Italy had placed him in its witness protection program, but Tlil felt the terms of the program weren't generous enough.

Mabrouk was convicted in February 2011. Armando Spataro set him free after sentencing him to time served. After his release he was deported to Tunisia. Domenico Quirico, an Italian journalist who interviewed him, said that the notorious Zaharouni neighborhood of Tunis where he settled was "too dangerous to frequent at night".

== Interview in Time ==
Time magazine published a translation of an interview first published in Italian in the Italian newspaper La Stampa. Domenico Quirico's interview with Mabrouk took place on May 2, 2011—shortly after US Navy SEALs had killed Osama bin Laden, and Quirico asked him for his assessment of bin Laden. Mabrouk called bin Laden a "man of honor", and asserted "even his enemies should recognize that he deserved respect."

During his interview he disputed the theory that he had been radicalized by devout Muslims while in Italian custody, prior to traveling to Afghanistan. He acknowledged that devout Muslims he met in jail helped him renew his own faith. He said his new faith had helped him quit using drugs. He said that, after his release, he gave up drug-dealing, and started working as a barber, and then as a delivery driver. He said that he applied for a legitimate visa, so he could continue living and working in Italy legally.

Mabrouk said that the main reason he traveled to Afghanistan was that he feared if he continued trying to live in Italy he would be deported back to Tunis, where he would face further incarceration in brutal Tunisian prisons.
