= Sharif Fati Ali Al Mishad =

Egyptian Guantanamo detainee (born 1976)

Sharif Fathi Ali Al-Mashad
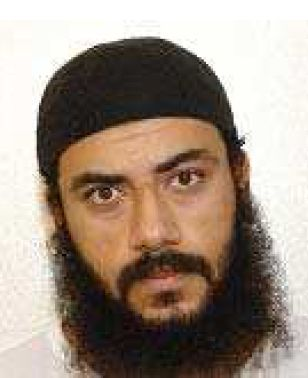
- Born: December 14, 1976 (age 49); Shibin El Kom, Egypt
- Arrested: 2001-11; Pakistan; Pakistani border guards
- Released: 2012-02-25; Albania
- Citizenship: Egypt
- Detained at: Kandahar, Guantanamo
- ISN: 190
- Charge: no charge extrajudicial detention
- Status: transferred to Albania
- Occupation: Building contractor

Sharif Fati Ali Al Mishad also known as Sherif el Mashad is a citizen of Egypt who was held in extrajudicial detention in the United States Guantanamo Bay detention camps, in Cuba. His Guantanamo Internment Serial Number was 190. Joint Task Force Guantanamo analysts report he was born on December 14, 1976, in Shibin El Kom, Egypt.

== Life prior to his capture ==
According to Andy Worthington, the author of The Guantanamo Files, Mashad was a businessman, who had made his home in Italy, who had travelled to Afghanistan solely to provide humanitarian aid. He had been a talented athlete and craftsman. He worked at Beach resorts in Sinai for three years, after graduating from technical school, then went to live in Italy with an uncle who was an Italian citizen. After working in construction in Italy he started his own successful construction firm

== Afghanistan and capture and interrogation ==
Worthington describes Mashad agreeing to travel to Afghanistan to work with a Kuwaiti businessman and philanthropist. According to Worthington Mushad would later describe this decision as a combination charitable exercise and business networking opportunity -- "like attending a fundraising gala".

Mashad arrived in Afghanistan, in mid-2001, in spite of his mother's reservations, according to Worthington. He was trapped in Afghanistan after the Afghan-Iranian border closed following the US counter-attacks. He was able to cross the border with Pakistan, in November 2001, but was promptly apprehended by a Pakistani border patrol.

Worthington attributed his continued detention by US forces to "patently false" denunciations from other captives. He offered the example of a denunciation from one of the Guantanamo captives who passed right from being a Taliban prison to US custody. This captive claimed Mashad had been one of his torturers, in 2000. Worthington repeated how Mashad had insisted to his interrogators that he was living in Italy in 2000 as his documents clearly established.

Another allegation that Mashad thought he could refute was that he had been aiding Arabs in Bosnia, in 1991, when that country was breaking away from Yugoslavia. At that time Mashad pointed out he was a fourteen-year-old schoolboy in Egypt.

== Sharif Fathim Al Mushad v. George Walker Bush ==
A writ of habeas corpus was submitted on Sharif Fathim Al Mushad's behalf. In response, on 16 August 2005 the Department of Defense released 17 pages of unclassified documents related to his Combatant Status Review Tribunal.

On December 15, 2004 Tribunal panel 25 confirmed that he was an "enemy combatant".

According to Worthington even though his habeas petition had been filed in 2005 he didn't meet with Cori Crider, of Reprieve until 2008.

== OARDEC status reviews ==
In its 2004 ruling in Rasul v. Bush the United States Supreme Court order the Department of Defense to conduct hearings where the captives could learn why they were being held, and where they could try to refute those allegations. Records from the 2004, 2005, 2005 and 2007 hearings were published due to Freedom of Information Act requests.

== Recommendation for Continued Detention Under DoD Control ==
In April 2010 the whistleblower organization WikiLeaks published a Recommendation for Continued Detention Under DoD Control, dated September 15, 2008. This eight page formerly secret document was signed by camp commandant David M Thomas, and recommended continued detention.

== Transfer from Guantanamo ==
Sharif Fati Ali al Mishad was transferred to Albania in February 2010 after he spent almost eight years in the Guantanamo camps.

In March 2012 Albania refused to let Mashad return to his home Egypt. Following the overthrow of the Hosni Mubarak regime former Egyptian captives who feared reprisal and who were thus sent to third countries, have been assured it is now safe for them to return to Egypt. Albanian officials have not explained why they will not allow him to leave. His Albanian born wife is also prevented from leaving the country, even though she has a valid visa for Egypt.
