= Osama bin Laden's bodyguards =

American officials have reported that Osama bin Laden, the founder of al-Queda, had numerous bodyguards. They reported that the detainees held in the Guantanamo Bay detention camp included at least 30 of bin Laden's bodyguards.

== Bodyguard lifestyles ==
How long Osama bin Laden had known an individual before he would trust him to be a bodyguard has been a topic of debate. According to Steve Coll, in his book Ghost Wars,

"Bin Laden practiced intensive operational security. He was wary of telephones. He allowed no Afghans into his personal bodyguard, only Arabs he had known and trusted for many years."

Historian Andy Worthington, author of The Guantanamo Files, has pointed out that many of those Guantanamo analysts characterized as Osama bin Laden bodyguards had only been in Afghanistan for weeks.

According to Graeme Steven and Rohan Gunaratna, in Counterterrorism: A Reference Handbook, Ali Mohammad, formerly a captain in the Egyptian army, who became an American citizen and a sergeant in the US Special Forces, provided the initial training to the early cohort of Osama bin Laden's bodyguards.

One source of the allegations was Guantanamo captive Mohammed al Qahtani. Al Qahtani was believed to be one of the 20 hijackers. The DoD acknowledges he was subjected to "extended interrogation techniques, including two months of sleep-deprivation". Other sources described his treatment as torture. After this, he is reported to have denounced 30 other Guantanamo captives as being bodyguards of Osama Bin Laden.

On April 23, 2010, Benjamin Weiser, writing in The New York Times, reported that a newly released 52-page interrogation summary, published during Ahmed Khalfan Ghailani's civilian trial, revealed new details about the life of an Osama Bin Laden bodyguard. According to Weiser, the interrogation summary asserted that Ghailani said he was told Bin Laden had personally requested he agree to serve as one of his bodyguards; that he was asked twice to be a bodyguard; and that he did not believe bin Laden had actually personally requested him. According to Weiser the interrogation summary asserted Ghailani had served as a bodyguard for approximately one year, and he was one of approximately fifteen bodyguards. According to Weiser the interrogation summary asserted that Ghailani was armed with an AK-47, and that during that year he spoke with Bin Laden numerous times. According to Weiser the interrogation summary asserted that Ghailani and several other individuals who served with him as bodyguards were among those who later became hijackers in the September 11 attacks.

== List of alleged bodyguards ==
List of alleged Osama Bin Laden bodyguards
ID	Name	Accuser	Notes
26	Fahed Abdullah Ahmad Ghazi	JTF-GTMO based on unknown source(s)	During his Combatant Status Review Tribunal he faced the following allegation: "After attending training at the Al Farouq training camp, the detainee was chosen to go to Tora Bora and become one of Usama Bin Laden’s bodyguards."
37	Abd al Malik Abd al Wahab	JTF-GTMO based on unknown source(s)	One of the allegations he faced, during his Tribunal, was: "The detainee was very close to Usama Bin Laden, and had been with him a long time. He was a known Usama Bin Laden guard and errand boy and was frequently seen at Osama Bin Laden's side. Also the detainee attended various other training camps and resided at a Kandahar, Afghanistan guesthouse."
45	Ali Ahmad Muhammad Al Rahizi	JTF-GTMO based on unknown source(s)	During both his Tribunal and Review Board hearing he faced the allegation: "The detainee has been identified as a bodyguard for Usama Bin Laden."
175	Ghallab Bashir	JTF-GTMO based on unknown source(s)	During his Combatant Status Review Tribunal he faced the following allegation: "The detainee was a bodyguard for Usama Bin Laden.
321	Ahmed Yaslam Said Kuman	JTF-GTMO based on unknown source(s)	One of the allegations he faced, during his Administrative Review Board hearing was: "The detainee served on the front line and was assumed to be a bodyguard for Usama Bin Laden."
10012	Ahmed Khalfan Ghailani	JTF-GTMO interrogation	Allegedly confessed to spending a year as one of approximately 15 Osama Bin Laden bodyguards.
	Nasir Ahmad Nasir al-Bahri		Questioned over a role in the USS Cole bombing, but released.
	Amin al-Haq		He was captured by Pakistani security officials; his relatively rapid release triggered criticism from Chairman of the Joint Chiefs of Staff Michael Mullen. Openly returned to his hometown in Afghanistan on 29 August 2021.
	Yusuf bin Salih bin Fahd al-Ayiri		Went on to become the first leader of Al-Qaeda in the Arabian Peninsula, killed by Saudi security forces in 2003.
	Shadi Abdalla	Germany, USA	Detained in Germany, released into a witness protection program, and removed from the United Nations 1267 list, after he pleaded guilty to lesser charges and agreed to testify against other suspects.
