= Ridah Bin Saleh Al Yazidi =

Tunisian Guantanamo Bay detainee (born 1965)

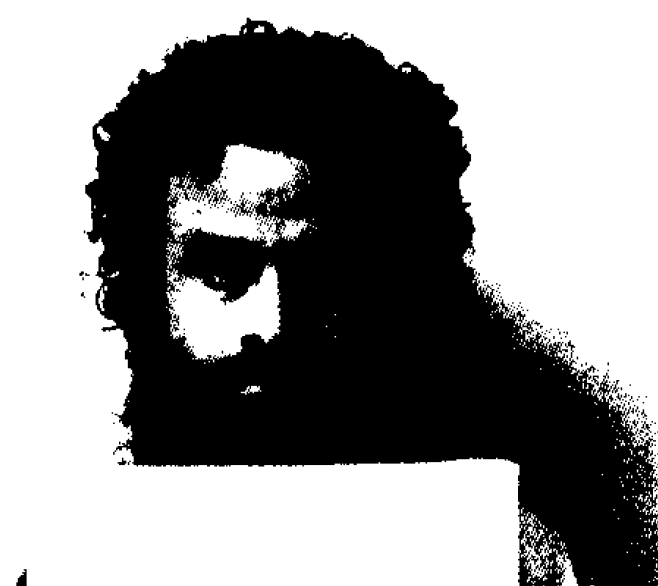
- Born: January 24, 1965 (age 61); Enfidha, Tunisia
- Detained at: Guantanamo
- ISN: 38
- Charge(s): No charge, held in extrajudicial detention
- Status: Released

Ridah Bin Saleh Bin Mabrouk Al Yazidi (born January 24, 1965) is a citizen of Tunisia who was held in extrajudicial detention in the United States Guantanamo Bay detainment camps, in Cuba since the day it opened, on January 11, 2002. Al Yazidi's Guantanamo detainee ID number was 38.

== Official status reviews ==
Originally the Bush Presidency asserted that captives apprehended in the "war on terror" were not covered by the Geneva Conventions, and could be held indefinitely, without charge, and without an open and transparent review of the justifications for their detention. In 2004 the United States Supreme Court ruled, in Rasul v. Bush, that Guantanamo captives were entitled to being informed of the allegations justifying their detention, and were entitled to try to refute them.

=== Office for the Administrative Review of Detained Enemy Combatants ===
Combatant Status Review Tribunals were held in a 3x5 meter trailer where the captive sat with his hands and feet shackled to a bolt in the floor.

Following the Supreme Court's ruling the Department of Defense set up the Office for the Administrative Review of Detained Enemy Combatants.

Scholars at the Brookings Institution, led by Benjamin Wittes, listed the captives still held in Guantanamo in December 2008, according to whether their detention was justified by certain common allegations:

- Ridah Bin Saleh Bin Mabrouk Al Yazidi was listed as one of the captives who the Wittes team unable to identify as presently cleared for release or transfer.
- Ridah Bin Saleh Bin Mabrouk Al Yazidi was listed as one of the captives who "The military alleges ... are members of the Taliban."
- Ridah Bin Saleh Bin Mabrouk Al Yazidi was listed as one of the captives who "The military alleges ... traveled to Afghanistan for jihad."
- Ridah Bin Saleh Bin Mabrouk Al Yazidi was listed as one of the captives who "The military alleges that the following detainees stayed in Al Qaeda, Taliban or other guest- or safehouses."
- Ridah Bin Saleh Bin Mabrouk Al Yazidi was listed as one of the captives who "The military alleges ... took military or terrorist training in Afghanistan."
- Ridah Bin Saleh Bin Mabrouk Al Yazidi was listed as one of the captives who "The military alleges ... fought for the Taliban."
- Ridah Bin Saleh Bin Mabrouk Al Yazidi was listed as one of the captives who "The military alleges ... were at Tora Bora."
- Ridah Bin Saleh Bin Mabrouk Al Yazidi was listed as one of the captives who "The military alleges that the following detainees were captured under circumstances that strongly suggest belligerency."
- Ridah Bin Saleh Bin Mabrouk Al Yazidi was listed as one of the captives who was an "al Qaeda operative".
- Ridah Bin Saleh Bin Mabrouk Al Yazidi was listed as one of the "82 detainees made no statement to CSRT or ARB tribunals or made statements that do not bear materially on the military’s allegations against them."

=== Habeas corpus petitions ===
Al Yazidi's original habeas corpus petition was amalgamated with David Hicks's -- Civil Action No. 02-cv-0299.

179 captives who had habeas petitions files on their behalf had a dossier of unclassified documents from their Combatant Status Review Tribunals published. But Al Yazidi's documents were withheld. The Bush administration did not offer an explanation as to why his documents were withheld.

The Military Commissions Act of 2006 mandated that Guantanamo captives were no longer entitled to access the US civil justice system, so all outstanding habeas corpus petitions were stayed.

On June 12, 2008, the United States Supreme Court ruled, in Boumediene v. Bush, that the Military Commissions Act could not remove the right for Guantanamo captives to access the US Federal Court system. And all previous Guantanamo captives' habeas petitions were eligible to be re-instated.

Al Yazidi's counsel have submitted requests to re-instate his habeas petition. On July 7, 2008, Brent N. Rushforth filed a "PETITIONER’S UNOPPOSED MOTION TO ENTER PROTECTIVE ORDER"' on behalf of Ridah Bin Saleh Al Yazidi.

=== Formerly secret Joint Task Force Guantanamo assessment ===
On April 25, 2011, whistleblower organization WikiLeaks published formerly secret assessments drafted by Joint Task Force Guantanamo analysts. His Joint Task Force Guantanamo assessment was drafted on June 6, 2007. It was signed by camp commandant Rear Admiral Mark H. Buzby. He recommended continued detention.

=== Joint Review Task Force ===
On January 21, 2009, the day he was inaugurated, United States President Barack Obama issued three Executive orders related to the detention of individuals in Guantanamo. He put in place a new review system composed of officials from six departments, where the OARDEC reviews were conducted entirely by the Department of Defense. When it reported back, a year later, the Joint Review Task Force classified some individuals as too dangerous to be transferred from Guantanamo, even though there was no evidence to justify laying charges against them. On April 9, 2013, that document was made public after a Freedom of Information Act request. Al Yazidi was one of the 126 individuals approved for transfer.

=== Status during the Donald Trump administration ===
Observers noted that President Barack Obama's administration made a push to transfer as many individuals from Guantanamo, as possible, during his last year. The Washington Post reported that Ridah Bin Saleh Al Yazidi was one of the five individuals who had been cleared for release, who remained in Guantanamo when Donald Trump was inaugurated. During the election campaign Trump had promised that, once he took power, no one would ever leave detention at Guantanamo, that he would bring more individuals to be detained there. The Washington Post reported that Obama administration officials had gotten a country to accept Al Yazidi, but he declined their hospitality.

== Release ==
Al Yazidi was transferred to Tunisia on December 30, 2024.
