= Journal of Education =

Academic journal

The Journal of Education (ISSN 0022-0574) is an academic journal, published by SAGE Publishing on behalf of the Boston University Wheelock College of Education & Human Development, with Hardin Coleman as its editor-in-chief. It bills itself as "the oldest educational publication in the country".

== History ==
The Journal of Education was formed in 1875 by the union of the Maine Journal of Education, the Massachusetts Teacher, the Rhode Island Schoolmaster, the Connecticut School Journal, and the College Courant. The oldest of these, the Connecticut School Journal, had been published under various names since 1838. The merged journal was originally called the New England Journal of Education from 1875 to 1880 and (after several additional mergers, including with the National Journal of Education) became the Journal of Education by 1892.

The Boston University School of Education took over as its publisher in 1953. By the early 1970s, the relevance of the journal had lagged, and the school revitalized it by turning it into a student-run journal, modeling it after student-run law review journals. In 2009, this decision was overturned, and the journal instituted peer review for its articles and editorial control by "eminent scholars" rather than students.

== See also ==
- American Journal of Education
- Australian Journal of Education
- European Journal of Education
- Journal of Education Policy
