= United States v. Jawad =

Mohamed Jawad -- three months before capture. Human rights workers claim he was only 12 or 13 years old when captured.

United States v. Mohamed Jawad is one of the military commissions convened under the authority of the Military Commissions Act of 2006.

Mohamed Jawad was an Afghan youth who was alleged to have participated in a grenade attack in Khost, Afghanistan, on December 17, 2002. Although American officials asserted that bone scans established that Jawad was over eighteen when he was transferred to Guantanamo, in 2003, Afghan human rights workers argued that Jawad was only twelve or thirteen when the incident occurred.

== Jawad's testimony before his Combatant Status Review Tribunal ==
Jawad testified before his Combatant Status Review Tribunal in the fall of 2004. Jawad testified that he was living with his uncle, when he was approached at the mosque, by men who offered him a good paying job—clearing land-mines in Afghanistan. However, when he arrived at the camp in Afghanistan where he was told he was to be trained to clear land-mines, he was instead drugged, and was told to carry objects in his pocket, and led to a bazaar in Khost. He testified he was told to wait by those who led the expedition. He testified he remembered hearing a distant explosion. He testified that while still feeling intoxicated he decided to buy some raisins from a food stall in the bazaar, and in order to do so he had to remove the objects from his pockets, only to be told by the stall owner that they were bombs, and that he should rush to throw them in the nearby river. He testified he followed the merchant's instructions and was running down the street, telling people to get out of his way because he had a bomb, when he was captured.

== Charges drafted ==
Charges were drafted in October 2007. Jawad was charged with "Attempted Murder in Violation of the Law of War" and "Intentionally Causing Serious Bodily Injury".

=== Concerns over torture and abusive interrogation ===
Darrel Vandeveld, the military attorney initially assigned to prosecute Jawad, has described being initially skeptical of accounts that Jawad had been subjected to abusive interrogation. He became convinced that Jawad had been subjected to serious abuse and he then worked to get the charges against Jawad dropped, and to have him repatriated to a rehabilitation program in Afghanistan. This prompted his superiors to order him to undergo a psychological assessment. Vandeveld eventually resigned and spoke out against the commission system.

After Vandeveld's resignation documents emerged that confirmed that Jawad had been subjected to the controversial Guantanamo "frequent flyer" sleep deprivation program.

Stephen R. Henley, the Presiding Officer over Jawad's Commission ruled that Jawad had been tortured, while in Afghan custody, and that confessions he made when he was transferred to US custody were inadmissible due to the recent torture, as were admissions made following the use of sleep deprivation. The newly appointed Prosecutor appealed Henley's ruling to the Court of Military Commission Review.
