= Randall Schmidt =

United States Air Force general

Randall Mark Schmidt
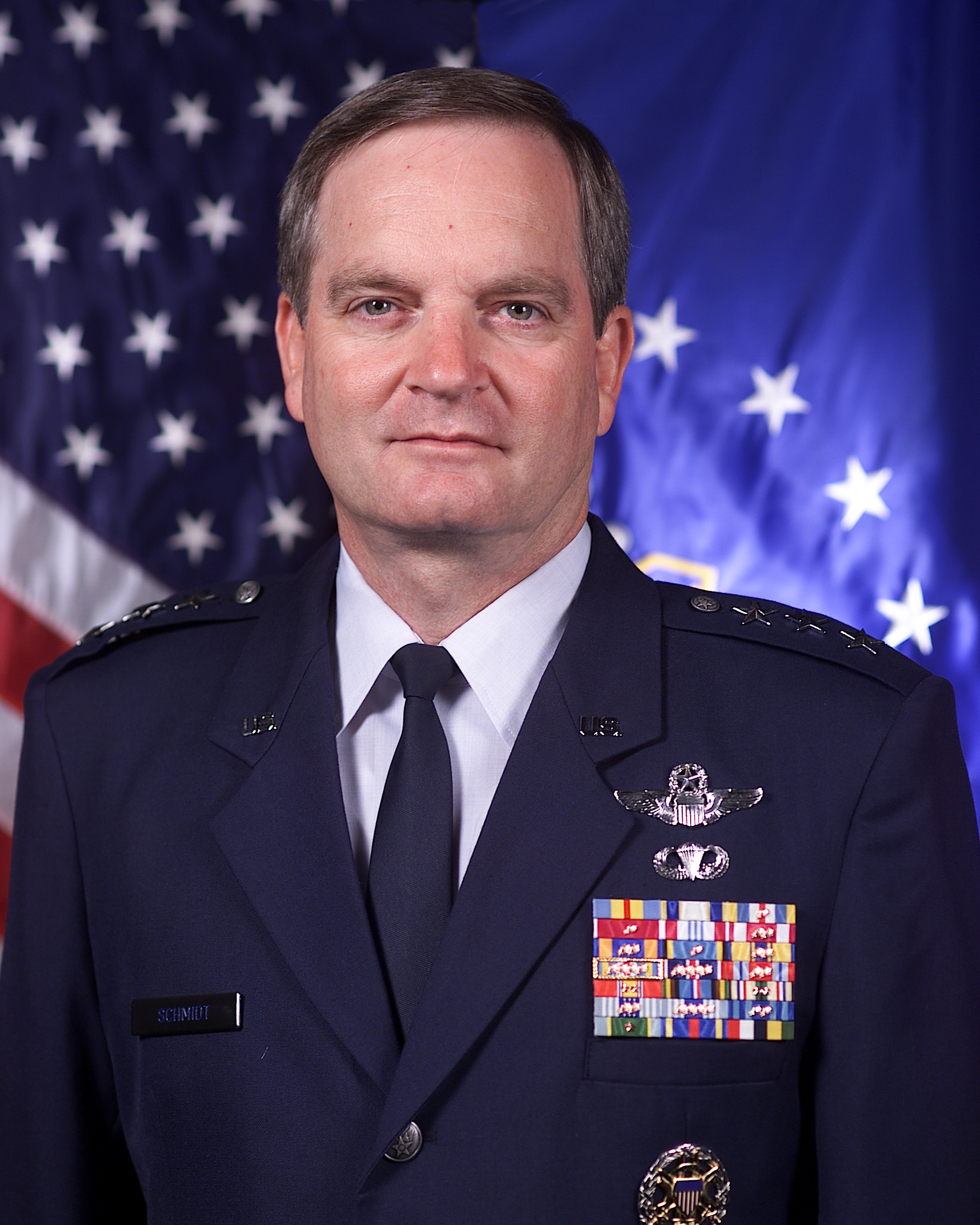
- Lieutenant General Randall Mark Schmidt
- Military career
- Allegiance: United States of America
- Branch: United States Air Force
- Service years: 1972–2006
- Rank: Lieutenant general
- Commands: 12th Air Force; 24th Wing; 1st Fighter Squadron
- Awards: Defense Distinguished Service Medal; Distinguished Service Medal; Defense Superior Service Medal (2); Legion of Merit (2); Defense Meritorious Service Medal; Meritorious Service Medal] (3); Air Medal (2); Aerial Achievement Medal (2); Air Force Commendation Medal (3)

Randall Mark Schmidt was a lieutenant general in the United States Air Force.

Schmidt was appointed to conduct an inquiry into FBI reports that detainees at Guantanamo Bay were being subjected to inhumane interrogation. The unclassified summary of Schmidt's report acknowledges that one high-value detainee was subjected to almost continuous interrogation, for 18 to 20 hours per day, for almost two months. It describes the long-term effect of this interrogation as "degrading and abusive", but that it did not rise to the level of "inhumane".

Featured in the 2008 Academy award-winning documentary Taxi to the Dark Side

He was formerly the Commander, 12th Air Force and Air Forces Southern, Davis-Monthan Air Force Base, Arizona. Twelfth Air Force comprises seven active-duty wings and three direct reporting units in the western and midwestern United States. The fighter and bomber wings possess 400 aircraft and more than 33,000 active-duty military and civilian personnel. The three direct reporting units, the 3rd Combat Communications Group, 820th Red Horse Squadron and 1st Air Support Operations Group, comprise more than 1,200 personnel. He is also responsible for the operational readiness of 12th Air Force-gained wings of the Air Force Reserve and Air National Guard, featuring an additional 18,800 personnel and more than 200 aircraft. As the Commander, Air Forces Southern, a component to the Combatant Commander, U.S. Southern Command, he oversees Air Force assets, five forward operating locations, and civil and military engagements in Central and South America as well as the Caribbean.

General Schmidt entered the Air Force through the United States Air Force Academy in 1972. He has commanded a fighter squadron, operations group, three wings and a combatant Joint Task Force. He also served in key positions during tours with the Air Staff, major commands and the Joint Staff.

General Schmidt is a command pilot with more than 4,600 hours, primarily in fighter aircraft. He flew the F-15C in combat operations during operations Provide Comfort and Southern Watch. He served as a mission commander against the hostile resurgent force of Iraqi Integrated Air Defense Systems while serving as the operations group commander at Incirlik Air Base, Turkey, for the multi-national air component. General Schmidt also commanded the 5th and 7th Air Expeditionary Wings in Southwest Asia in response to hostile Iraqi maneuvers in the southern no-fly zone. As Commander, Joint Task Force – Southwest Asia, he led the effort to destroy more than 380 enemy targets. The general had a direct impact in supporting combat operations when he served as the Headquarters U.S. Air Force Assistant Deputy Chief of Staff for Air and Space Operations during Operation Iraqi Freedom.

Schmidt retired September 1, 2006.

On June 8, 2008, the Washington Post reported that Schmidt was expected to testify at the military commission of Mohammed Jawad, about the use of the "frequent flyer" program. The frequent flier program was the technique of repeatedly moving a captive from one cell to another, to keep them sleep deprived. During one fourteen-day period Jawad was reported to have been moved 112 times.

Schmidt wrote:

"Had I learned of the treatment of Mr. Jawad, it would have been included as a finding in my report. The fact that the frequent flyer program was apparently carried out after the point that we were told the practice had been discontinued is troubling."

== Education ==
- 1972 Bachelor of Science degree in engineering management, United States Air Force Academy, Colorado Springs, Colorado
- 1976 Master of Arts degree in psychology, University of Northern Colorado
- 1977 Distinguished graduate, Squadron Officer School, Maxwell AFB, Alabama
- 1983 Distinguished graduate, Air Command and Staff College, Maxwell AFB, Alabama
- 1991 Air War College, Maxwell AFB, Alabama
- 1998 Program for Senior Executives in National and International Security Affairs, John F. Kennedy School of Government, Harvard University

== Assignments ==
- June 1972 – June 1973, student, undergraduate pilot training, Williams AFB, Arizona
- June 1973 – December 1973, student, Replacement Training Unit, 474th Tactical Fighter Wing, Nellis AFB, Nevada
- January 1974 – June 1977, F-111 fighter pilot, 366th Tactical Fighter Wing, Mountain Home AFB, Idaho
- June 1977 – July 1979, F-111 instructor pilot, and standardization and evaluation officer, 48th Tactical Fighter Wing, Royal Air Force Lakenheath, England
- July 1979 – May 1980, action officer, Air Staff Training Program, Directorate of Personnel, Headquarters U.S. Air Force, Washington, D.C.
- May 1980 – July 1980, student, F-15 Transition Course, Luke AFB, Arizona
- July 1980 – August 1982, F-15 instructor pilot, flight commander, and Standardization and Evaluation Branch Chief, 18th Tactical Fighter Wing, Kadena AB, Japan
- August 1982 – June 1983, student, Air Command and Staff College, Maxwell AFB, Alabama
- July 1983 – August 1985, Commander, F-15 Technical Assistance Field Team, Khamis-Mushayet, Saudi Arabia
- August 1985 – July 1988, assistant operations officer, 94th Tactical Fighter Squadron, later, Chief, Standardization and Evaluation Division, 1st Tactical Fighter Wing, later, operations officer, 48th Fighter Interceptor Squadron, Langley AFB, Virginia
- July 1988 – August 1990, Commander, 1st Fighter Squadron, later, Assistant Deputy Commander for Operations, 325th Fighter Wing, Tyndall AFB, Florida
- August 1990 – June 1991, student, Air War College, Maxwell AFB, Alabama
- June 1991 – December 1991, Chief, Middle East, Africa and South Asia Policy, Plans and Operations Directorate, Headquarters U.S. Air Force, Washington, D.C.
- December 1991 – April 1992, Deputy Assistant Director, Joint Chiefs of Staff and National Security Council Matters, Headquarters U.S. Air Force, Washington, D.C.
- April 1992 – June 1993, Commander, 39th Operations Group, Incirlik AB, Turkey
- July 1993 – May 1994, Commander, 20th Fighter Wing, RAF Upper Heyford, England
- May 1994 – August 1995, Chief, Western Hemisphere Division (J-5), the Joint Staff, Washington, D.C.
- September 1995 – August 1997, Commander, 24th Wing; Commander, U.S. Southern Command Air Forces Forward; and Director, Joint Interagency Task Force - South, Howard AFB, Panama
- August 1997 – April 1999, Commander, 366th Wing, Mountain Home AFB, Idaho
- April 1999 – April 2000, Commander, Joint Task Force - Southwest Asia, and Commander, 9th Air and Space Expeditionary Task Force - Southwest Asia, U.S. Central Command, Riyadh, Saudi Arabia
- May 2000 – March 2002, Director of Air and Space Operations, Headquarters U.S. Air Forces Europe, Ramstein AB, Germany
- March 2002 – July 2003, Assistant Deputy Chief of Staff for Air and Space Operations, Headquarters U.S. Air Force, Washington, D.C.
- July 2003 – Sept 2006, Commander, 12th Air Force and Air Forces Southern, Davis-Monthan AFB, Arizona
- Retired 1 Sept 2006

== Flight Information ==
- Rating: Command pilot
- Flight hours: More than 4,600, including more than 270 combat hours
- Aircraft flown: F-111A/E/F, F-15A/B/C/D, A-10, F-16C Block 40/42, C-27 and C-21

== Major Awards and decorations ==
- Defense Distinguished Service Medal
- Air Force Distinguished Service Medal
- Defense Superior Service Medal with oak leaf cluster
- Legion of Merit with oak leaf cluster
- Defense Meritorious Service Medal
- Meritorious Service Medal with two oak leaf clusters
- Air Medal with oak leaf cluster
- Aerial Achievement Medal with oak leaf cluster
- Air Force Commendation Medal with two oak leaf clusters
- Joint Meritorious Unit Award with four oak leaf clusters
- Air Force Outstanding Unit Award with four oak leaf clusters
- Combat Readiness Medal with two oak leaf clusters
- National Defense Service Medal with bronze star
- Armed Forces Expeditionary Medal
- Southwest Asia Service Medal with two bronze stars
- Grand Cross of the Air Force Cross of Aeronautical Merit (Colombia)
- Estrella de las Fuerzas Armadas en el grado de Gran Estrella al Mérito Militar, Chile (Armed *Forces Military Star, Order of Grand Star for Military Merit)

== Other achievements ==
- 1975 Top Gun outstanding graduate, F-111 Replacement Training Unit, 366th Tactical Fighter Wing
- 1991 Air War College finalist, Secretary of the Air Force Leadership Award
- 1994 Joint Chiefs of Staff Delegate, Inter-American Defense Board, Washington, D.C.
- 1997 Director, Joint Interagency Task Force - South, Panama
- 1999 Moller Trophy for outstanding wing commander, Air Combat Command

== Effective dates of promotion ==
- Second Lieutenant June 7, 1972
- First Lieutenant June 7, 1974
- Captain June 7, 1976
- Major November 1, 1982
- Lieutenant Colonel April 1, 1987
- Colonel April 1, 1991
- Brigadier General March 1, 1996
- Major General July 1, 1999
- Lieutenant General September 1, 2003
