= David J. R. Frakt =

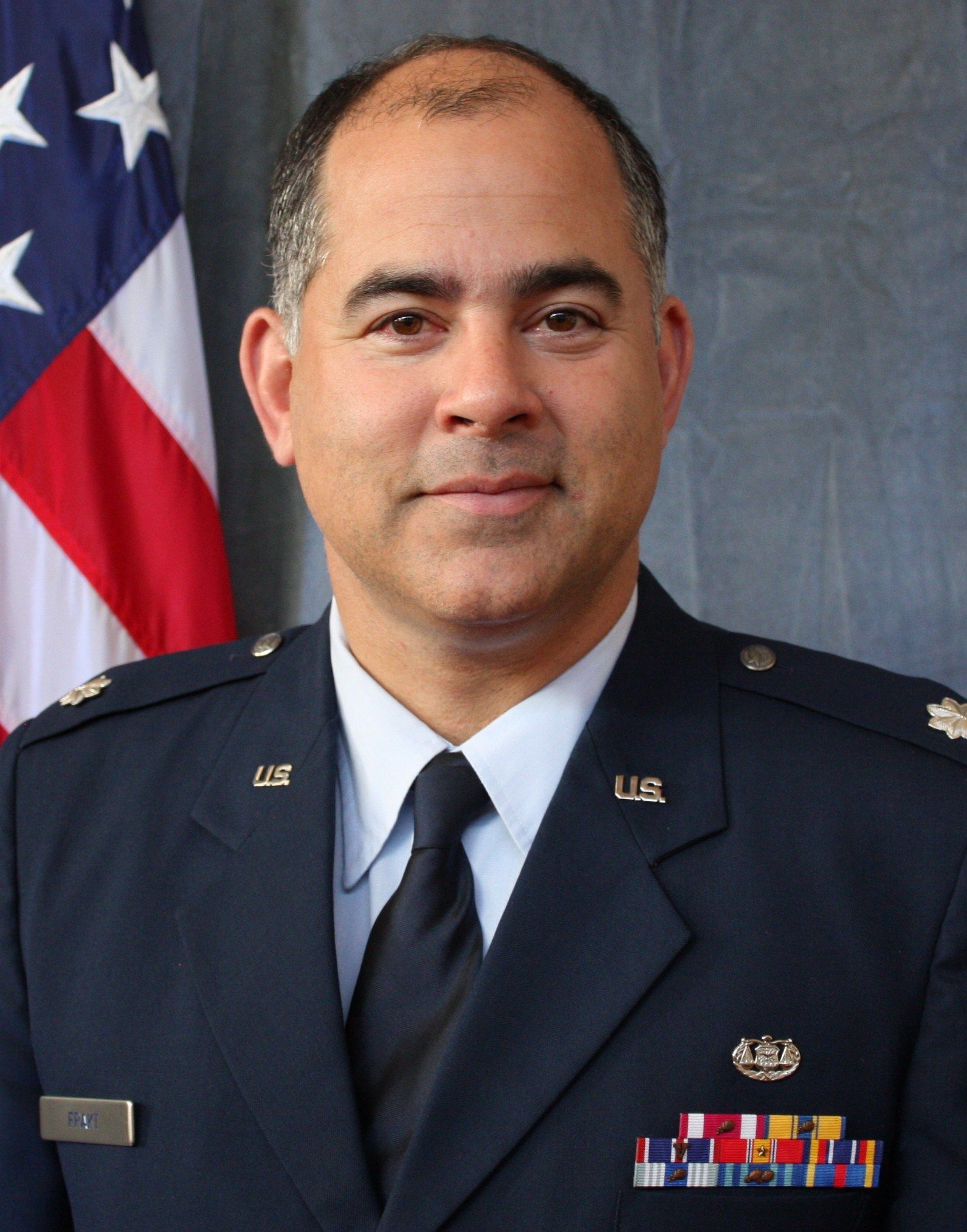
- Military career
- Branch: United States Air Force Reserve

David Frakt is an American lawyer, law professor, and officer in the United States Air Force Reserve.

== Education ==
Frakt is a 1987 graduate of the University High School, Irvine, California and a 1990 graduate of the University of California, Irvine, where he was named "Outstanding Senior" of his graduating class, and a 1994 honors graduate of Harvard Law School.

== Career ==
Frakt is notable for his appointment to defend Guantanamo detainee Mohammed Jawad, an alleged combatant facing charges for events that took place when he was a minor. Jawad is one of two detainees, along with Omar Khadr, to be prosecuted for acts they allegedly committed while juveniles. Frakt also represents another Guantanamo detainee who faced a military commission, Ali Hamza al-Bahlul, the alleged Al Qaida propaganda chief from Yemen. Frakt retired in 2018 as a Lieutenant Colonel after 23 years in the U.S. Air Force Reserve JAG Corps. He previously was a law professor at several law schools including Western State University College of Law in California, the Barry University Dwayne O. Andreas School of Law in Orlando, Florida, and the University of Pittsburgh School of Law. He was also an adjunct at the Georgetown Law Center.

In April 2014, Frakt was a candidate for the deanship of Florida Coastal School of Law. In the middle of giving a presentation where he described his ideas for addressing major problems at the school such as declining enrollment, reduced admission standards, and low morale, he was reportedly stopped by the school's president, told to stop "insulting" the faculty, and was then asked to leave. This episode was later dramatized in the 2017 documentary film Law School Confidential. The school closed in 2021.

== Challenged Brigadier Thomas Hartmann's role ==
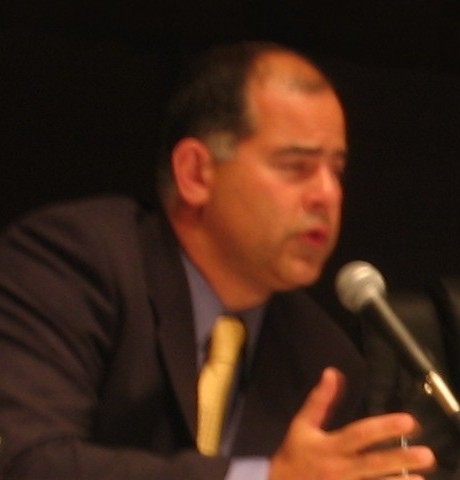
Frakt speaks in 2008, criticizing Hartmann's history in the case.

On June 19, 2008 Frakt challenged the role of Brigadier General Thomas W. Hartmann in choosing his client Mohammed Jawad for trial. Frakt argued that Hartmann had "...exercised unlawful command influence."

Hartmann had been appointed the legal advisor to the convening authority—the number two in the Office of Military Commissions, in the summer of 2007, and had immediately overrode the decisions of Colonel Morris Davis, who was then the Chief Prosecutor, when Davis was on leave.

Hartmann was widely quoted as saying the Prosecution should choose to charge captives based on whether their trials would: "...capture the imagination of the American people."

In May 2008 Captain Keith Allred, the Presiding Officer of Salim Ahmed Hamdan's Military Commission, ruled that Hartmann could no longer play any role in Hamdan's Commission process because of the appearance of impropriety shown by his participation to date.

Frakt argued to Colonel Stephen R. Henley, the Presiding Officer of Jawad's military commission, that Hartmann should be barred from any further participation in Jawad's Prosecution because of his exercise of "unlawful command interference."

The June 19, 2008, hearing where Frakt challenged Hartmann's participation and argued for dismissal of the charges based on torture and outrageous government conduct lasted 14 hours.

According to Carol Rosenberg, of the Miami Herald, Frakt argued that Jawad had been subjected to: "...pointless and sadistic treatment [in a] bleak underworld of barbarism and cruelty, of anything goes, of torture." Frakt's closing argument has been widely praised in the media. Jamil Dakwar, Director of the Human Rights Program for the ACLU called the argument "an historic closing argument that should be taught in every military academy across the country." Deborah Colson, of Human Rights First, in a report in the Huffington Post, called the argument a "most powerful indictment of Bush administration policies." Michael Winship, of Bill Moyer's Journal, called the argument "an unusual and especially fine expression of American patriotism." Pulitzer Prize–winning journalist Anthony Lewis described the argument as "a remarkable display of legal and moral courage." Frakt also argued, during his challenge of Hartmann's unlawful influence, that the Prosecution had failed to release important records to the Defense, and that this showed that the process through which Jawad was charged was rushed and without proper preparation.

On August 14, 2008 Henley barred Hartmann from future participation in Mohammed Jawad's commission. According to Mike Melia, writing for the Associated Press, Henley ruled that Hartmann: "...compromised his objectivity in public statements aligning himself with prosecutors and defending the Pentagon's system for prosecuting alleged terrorists."

However, Henley chose not to dismiss the charges against Jawad because of Hartmann's controversial conduct. He did rule that Frakt was authorized to submit arguments for dropping the charges against Jawad directly to Susan J. Crawford, the Convening Authority, as to whether charges against Jawad were justified. On September 12, Hartmann was removed from his position as Legal Advisor, and three days later Frakt submitted a plea to the Convening Authority to dismiss the charges, which included matters in mitigation and extenuation, legal arguments, and letters and a petition from concerned citizens. On September 23, Crawford rejected this appeal and reaffirmed her earlier decision to refer charges against Mohammad Jawad to trial.

== Comments on Frakt's efforts to have the charges against Jawad dismissed due to abusive conduct, including the "frequent flyer program" ==
In June 2008, prosecutor Lt Col Darrel Vandeveld turned over detention records which had been previously withheld to the defense. These records demonstrated that Mohammed Jawad had been subjected to the controversial "frequent flyer program" a euphemistic term used by Guantanamo detention officials to describe a frequent cell movement program which resulted in sleep disruption and deprivation. These records were made available to Frakt shortly before Mohammed Jawad's first hearing before his Military Commission. Based on these records, Frakt sought to have the charges against Jawad dismissed on the grounds of torture and "outrageous government conduct." Frakt reported at Jawad's June 19, 2008 Commission hearing that those records showed that Jawad had been moved 112 times in a two-week period in May 2004. Following previous inquiries into abusive treatment of detainees, this technique had reportedly been ordered discontinued two months prior to its use on Jawad by the then Commanding Officer of JTF-Guantanamo, Brig Gen Jay Hood.

On July 11, 2008, in another filing submitted to the Military Commission Frakt reported that the Prosecution had withheld evidence of the medical effects on his client of the two weeks of sleep deprivation. Frakt reported that Jawad's medical records, which had only recently been made available to him, contradicted the Prosecution's claims that Jawad had suffered "no ill effects" from the sleep deprivation. Frakt reported that the medical records showed that Jawad had lost ten percent of his body weight during his sleep deprivation, and that he had told doctors he had been urinating blood.

On August 7, 2008 an article in The Washington Post reported that newly published documents showed that the prohibited sleep deprivation technique had been in wider use than had previously been known. The Washington Post report quoted Frakt's response to the news of this violation:

- "...no one actually knows the full scope of the abuses at Guantanamo."
- "...all of these allegedly comprehensive investigations were whitewashes. This is only the tip of the iceberg."
- "This program was approved at the highest levels. ... It suggests that people had simply lost their ability to distinguish right from wrong."

Additional hearings were held on August 13–14 and September 26–27, 2008. At the August 13–14 hearing, an intelligence officer formerly stationed at Guantanamo testified that the frequent flyer program was "standard operating procedure" and was used on dozens of detainees until at least April 2005. On September 24, Col. Henley ruled that the frequent flyer program was cruel, abusive and inhumane treatment, and recommended those responsible be punished. However, he declined to dismiss the charges against Jawad, ruling that other lesser remedies were adequate to address the abuse. The next hearing is scheduled for December.

== Comments on Lt Col Darrel Vandeveld's resignation ==
On September 9, 2008, former lead prosecutor Lieutenant Colonel Darrel Vandeveld, an Army Reserve JAG, requested to be reassigned to other duties rather than continue to serve as prosecutor on the Jawad case. On September 24, 2008 Frakt commented on Lt Col Darrel Vandeveld's recent resignation, He said Vandeveld, whose resignation document has not yet been released: "could no longer continue to serve ethically as a prosecutor." According to The New York Times, Frakt said Vandeveld had been "troubled" by the orders he had been given. Frakt told The New York Times that Vandeveld had recommended a plea bargain and early release for Jawad, and had been overruled. Vandeveld later testified in a hearing on September 27, 2008 at Guantanamo that exculpatory evidence had been withheld from the Jawad defense, and that he had resigned because of concerns about the discovery process and his inability to determine whether all relevant discovery had been disclosed to the defense due to "systemic problems" with discovery at the Office of Military Commissions.

== Mohammed Jawad's noncombatant status ==
In July 2009 US District Court Judge Ellen Huvelle ruled Mohammed Jawad was a noncombatant. On July 28, 2009 Frakt filed a motion in Mohammed's military commission following Huvelle's ruling. He argued that the military commissions were only authorized to try illegal enemy combatants, and since he was officially a noncombatant his military commission lacked jurisdiction.

== Efforts to support Mohammed Jawad's re-integration into Afghan society ==
On September 21, 2009 historian Andy Worthington, author of The Guantanamo Files, published a letter from Frakt that documented the role he and his colleagues had hoped to play in Mohammed Jawad's re-integration into Afghan society. Frakt had argued to Susan Crawford that while civilian Defense attorneys didn't traditionally play a role in the lives of their clients, after their trials, the tradition for military Defense counsel was the opposite. Further, he argued that, as a child captive the literature strongly recommended the released captive be in the company of trusted adults—and the only trusted adults in his life recently had been his Defense counsel.

Frakt also described, at length, the significant role played by his colleagues on "Team Jawad", Commander Katharine Doxakis, Major Eric Montalvo USMCR, Captain Chris Kannady, USMC, civilian counsels Hina Shamsi, Jonathan Hafetz, Art Spitzer, military and civilian paralegals, a team of law students from Duke University, and a law student named Joe Pace, from Yale Law School.

== Publications ==
Frakt is the author of dozens of law review articles, book chapters, essays and op-eds. CNN published an Op-ed by Frakt, on March 17, 2010. Frakt argued that those Guantanamo captives who were to be tried, should be tried in a regular court of law, not the irregular military commissions.

He congratulated Attorney General Eric Holder for his plans to try the most senior suspects in civilian court. But he criticized Holder for planning to continue to try other suspects in the military commission system, writing:

Unfortunately, Holder also announced that other detainees would be tried in military commissions, creating a two-tiered system of justice. So far, the attorney general has failed to offer any principled basis for which defendants are sent to which forum, leaving many with the disturbing impression that the decisions are based on political, rather than legal, considerations.

He wrote that Ali Al Bahlul and Salim Ahmed Hamdan's convictions were being appealed, and he warned that it was not clear that their convictions would be upheld by the Court of Military Commission Review, due to many procedural errors.

In the winter of 2012 Frakt published a one hundred and twenty page article in the University of Pittsburgh Law Review, entitle: Prisoners of Congress: The Constitutional and political clash over detainees and the closure of Guantanamo.
