= Nivia =

Nivia may refer to:

== People ==
- Nivia Fernández Hernández, Puerto Rican dietician and academic administrator
- Nivia Palma (born 1959), Chilean politician and lawyer

== Other ==
- Nivia Sports, Indian sports equipment company
