= University Ranking by Academic Performance =

University ranking system

The University Ranking by Academic Performance (URAP) is a university ranking developed by the Informatics Institute of Middle East Technical University. Since 2010, it has been publishing annual national and global college and university rankings for top 2000 institutions. The scientometrics measurement of URAP is based on data obtained from the Institute for Scientific Information via Web of Science and inCites. For global rankings, URAP employs indicators of research performance including the number of articles, citation, total documents, article impact total, citation impact total, and international collaboration. In addition to global rankings, URAP publishes regional rankings for universities in Turkey using additional indicators such as the number of students and faculty members obtained from Center of Measuring, Selection and Placement ÖSYM.

== Methodology ==
URAP gathers data from international bibliometric databases such as Web of Science and InCites provided by the Institute for Scientific Information. URAP uses data of 2,500 Higher Education Institutions (HEI) with highest number of articles published. The overall score of each HEI is based on its performance over several indicators. Of 2500 selected HEIs, the top 2000 are included in the rankings published by URAP. Field based rankings are performed on 23 fields based on Australia ERA.

=== Indicators ===
URAP uses 6 main indicator to measure the academic performance. These indicators are number of articles, citation, total documents, article impact total, citation impact total, and international collaboration. The raw bibliometric data underlying URAP's 6 main indicators have highly skewed distribution. To address this issue, the median of the indicators have been used. The Delphi system was conducted with a group of experts to assign weighting scores to the indicators. Total score of 600 is distributed to indicators. URAP uses additional indicators for ranking universities in Turkey including the number of students and faculty members. The following table shows the indicators used for global rankings in URAP as of 2014.

Indicator	Objective	Weight (out of 600)	Source
Number of Articles	Scientific Productivity	%21	InCites
Citation	Research Impact	%21	InCites
Total Documents	Scientific Productivity	%10	InCites
Article Impact Total	Research Quality	%18	InCites
Citation Impact Total	Research Quality	%15	InCites
International Collaboration	International Acceptance	%15	InCites

==== Number of articles ====
Number of articles is used as a measure of current scientific productivity which includes articles indexed by Web of Science. This indicator covers articles, reviews and notes. The weight of this indicator in the overall ranking is %21.

==== Citation ====
Citation, as an indicator in URAP ranking, is a measure of research impact. It is scored according to the total number of citations received. The weight of this indicator in the overall ranking is %21.

==== Total documents ====
Total documents is the measure of sustainability and continuity of scientific productivity. The total document count covers all scholarly literature provided by the Web of Science database, including conference papers, reviews, letters, discussions, scripts, and journal articles. The weight of this indicator in the overall ranking is %10.

==== Article Impact Total (AIT) ====
Article Impact Total (AIT) is a measure of scientific productivity adjusted by the ratio of institution's Citation Per Publication (CPP) to the world CPP in 23 subject areas. The ratio of the institution's CPP and the world CPP indicates whether the institution is performing above or below the world average in that field. This ratio is multiplied by the number of publications in that field and then summed across the 23 fields, as shown in the following formula:

$AIT = \sum_{i=1}^{23} \Bigg[ \Bigg( \frac{CPP_i}{CPP\_{World_i}} \Bigg) * Articles_i \Bigg]$

The weight of this indicator in the overall ranking is %18.

==== Citation Impact Total (CIT) ====
Citation Impact Total (CIT) is a measure of research impact corrected by the institution's normalized CPP with respect to the world CPP in 23 subject areas. The ratio of the institution's CPP and the world CPP indicates whether the institution is performing above or below the world average in that field. This ratio is multiplied by the number of citations in that field and then summed across the 23 fields, as shown in the following formula:

$CIT = \sum_{i=1}^{23} \Bigg[ \Bigg( \frac{CPP_i}{CPP\_{World_i}} \Bigg) * Citations_i \Bigg]$

The weight of this indicator in the overall ranking is %15.

==== International collaboration ====
International Collaboration is a measure of global acceptance of the institution. International collaboration data, which is based on the total number of published studies conducted in collaboration with foreign universities, is obtained from InCites. The weight of this indicator in the overall ranking is %15.

== Current rankings ==
=== Global ranking ===
University Ranking by Academic Performance—Top 50 (Note: This table lists the top 50 institutions as of the 2020–21 rankings.)
Institution	2021-22	2020-21	2019–20	2018–19	2017–18	2016–17	2015–16	2014–15
(United States) Harvard University	1	1	1	1	1	1	1	1
(Canada) University of Toronto	2	2	2	2	2	2	2	2
(United Kingdom) University College London	3	4	3	5	6	5	6	6
(United States) Stanford University	4	3	4	4	5	4	8	7
(United Kingdom) University of Oxford	5	5	5	3	3	3	3	3
(United States) Johns Hopkins University	6	6	6	6	8	6	4	4
(United Kingdom) University of Cambridge	7	7	7	7	9	8	5	5
(United States) University of Michigan	8	8	8	9	11	10	10	10
(United States) University of Washington	9	10	9	10	12	11	11	11
(China) Tsinghua University	10	12	12	18	25	38	48	58
(China) Shanghai Jiao Tong University	11	18	19	24	32	39	50	59
(United Kingdom) Imperial College London	12	13	13	11	16	15	15	15
(France) University of Paris-Saclay	13	9	94 (Note: As University of Paris-Sud.)	91	80	87	70	69
(United States) University of Pennsylvania	14	15	14	15	14	13	13	13
(China) Zhejiang University	15	20	20	31	33	34	42	46
(United States) University of California, Los Angeles	16	16	15	13	13	12	12	12
(United States) Massachusetts Institute of Technology	17	11	11	8	7	7	7	9
(France) Sorbonne University	18	14	10	17	4 (Note: As Pierre and Marie Curie University.)	26	26	25
(United States) Columbia University	19	17	16	14	15	14	14	14
(Australia) University of Sydney	20	24	24	23	26	27	29	30
(Denmark) University of Copenhagen	21	19	18	16	17	16	16	22
(China) Peking University	22	21	21	22	29	33	44	48
(Australia) University of Melbourne	23	25	23	26	30	31	30	29
(France) University of Paris	24	23	97 (Note: As Paris Diderot University.)	95	87	85	78	76
(United States) University of California, San Diego	25	26	22	19	18	17	17	16
(United States) University of California, San Francisco	26	30	31	28	24	22	19	18
National University of Singapore	27	32	28	30	27	29	32	34
(United States) Cornell University	28	28	29	25	23	25	25	24
(Canada) University of British Columbia	29	29	27	27	21	21	22	20
(United States) Yale University	30	27	26	21	20	19	20	21
(Brazil) University of São Paulo	31	33	33	38	36	40	35	31
(Australia) Monash University	32	37	39	46	53	57	62	64
(United States) University of California, Berkeley	33	22	17	12	10	9	9	8
(Australia) University of Queensland	34	35	35	39	40	41	43	51
(China) Sun Yat-sen University	35	48	60	83	93	99	113	116
(United States) Duke University	36	34	34	33	28	24	24	23
(Japan) University of Tokyo	37	31	25	20	19	18	18	17
(Belgium) KU Leuven	38	38	37	42	41	23	23	38
(Australia) University of New South Wales	39	42	44	52	60	71	74	78
(Netherlands) University of Amsterdam	40	40	48	51	63	61	61	61
(United States) Ohio State University	41	39	38	36	38	37	33	32
(China) Huazhong University of Science and Technology	42	49	56	81	94	111	135	155
(United States) University of Pittsburgh	43	43	40	35	35	32	31	28
(Sweden) Karolinska Institute	44	50	51	48	51	53	60	57
(China) Fudan University	45	54	58	62	68	74	90	94
(United States) University of Chicago	46	36	30	29	22	20	21	19
(United States) Northwestern University	47	46	45	43	46	38	37	37
(Netherlands) Utrecht University	48	45	42	40	45	44	37	35
(South Korea) Seoul National University	49	51	47	49	44	50	36	42
(United States) University of Minnesota	50	44	32	32	31	28	27	27

=== Rankings by field ===
- https://urapcenter.org/Rankings/2020-2021/fields

== Commentary and reception ==
URAP covers considerably more institutions than other major ranking systems. In a section about URAP in “Where Are the Global Rankings Leading Us? An Analysis of Recent Methodological Changes and New Developments” published in the European Journal of Education it is mentioned that ”While it is less well-known than SRG, ARWU, THE, and QS, it is interesting because it published a list of 2000 universities, while the above rankings cover a maximum of 700 universities.” This is also mentioned in the “EUA report on Ranking for 2013 “ published by the European University Association. It indicates that URAP, along with SCImago ranking system, “fill an important gap in the rankings market in that their indicators measure the performance of substantially more universities, up to 2000 in the case of URAP and over 3000 in SCImago, compared to only 400 in THE, 500 in SRC ARWU, NTU ranking and CWTS Leiden, and around 700 in QS.”

URAP is mentioned as one of the four ranking systems that solely measure the academic performance. The other three are Performance Ranking of Scientific Papers for World Universities, CWTS Leiden Ranking, and SCImago Institutions Rankings. URAP excludes teaching indicators, such as student quality and teaching performance, from global rankings and only covers research-oriented indicators. In the “International Benchmarking in UK higher Education” report of the Higher Education Statistics Agency, URAP is listed among the benchmarking resources for measuring academic. In the same report, URAP is categorized in the “whole university rankings” along with Times Higher Education World University Rankings (THE), QS World University Rankings, Academic Ranking of World Universities (ARWU), CHE Excellence Rankings, RatER Global University Ranking of World Universities, Webometrics Ranking of World Universities, 2010 World University Ranking, SIR World Report, CWTS Leiden Ranking, U-Multirank, European Research Ranking, Performance Ranking of Scientific Papers for World Universities, Human Resources & Labor Review (HRLR), and Professional Classification of Higher Education Institutions.

=== URAP in Research, Books, and Reports ===
URAP is mentioned and used in several studies based on, or referring to, global rankings. In the “World University Ranking Systems: An Alternative Approach Using Partial Least Squares Path Modeling” article, published in the Journal of Higher Education Policy and Management, Urap is incorporated in the suggested model as one of the nine major worldwide university ranking systems along with ARWU, QS, Times, Webometrics, Taiwan. Leiden, SIR, and CWUR. In the same article, URAP is categorized among the ranking systems that are based solely on publication performance. The other ranking systems in the same category are Performance Ranking of Scientific Papers for World Universities, CWTS Leiden Ranking, and SCImago Institutions Rankings.

The following is a list of some of the books, peer-reviewed articles, and conference proceedings that have covered URAP or have incorporated it in their models or comparisons.

- Where Are the Global Rankings Leading Us? An Analysis of Recent Methodological Changes and New Developments, European Journal of Education
- World university ranking systems: an alternative approach using partial least squares path modelling, Journal of Higher Education Policy and Management
- Sustainable Development and Quality Assurance in Higher Education: Transformation of Learning and Society
- Determinants of University Choice: A Study on Economics Departments in Turkey, Journal of Higher Education.
- Collecting University Rankings for Comparison Using Web Extraction and Entity Linking Techniques, Information and Communication Technologies in Education, Research, and Industrial Applications.
- URAP-TR: a national ranking for Turkish universities based on academic performance, Scientometrics.
- Global University Rankings and Their Impact, EUA Report in Rankings 2013, European University Association.
- Contributions of Turkish academicians supervising PhD dissertations and their universities to economics: an evaluation of the 1990–2011 period, Scientometrics.
- A Type-2 Fuzzy MCDM Method for Ranking Private Universities in İstanbul, Proceedings of the World Congress on Engineering, 2014.
- Adoption of Web 2.0 in academic libraries of top African universities, The Electronic Library.
- Examining Job Description to Develop Job Performance Indicators for Higher Education Institution Based on MBNQA Education Criteria, Journal of Education & Vocational Research.
- Software Quality in Academic Curriculum: A Case Study in Turkey, 12th International Conference on Computational Science and Its Applications (ICCSA).
- University Ranking Lists:A directory., 2013 Report, Division of Analysis and Evaluation, University of Gothenburg.
- The "ASERF E News Bulletin on Education" published by Apeejay Stya Education Research Foundation compares the ranking results of THE with other ranking systems, including URAP and QS, for the top 10 universities in some countries.

=== URAP in Press ===
- Thomson Reuters partners with Times on university rankings
- Press release of University of Tübingen, released on 03.04.2013, covered the ranking of the university based in URAP.
- Turkey and Arab states announce new HE collaboration, University World News
- Power and responsibility – The growing influence of global rankings, University World News
- 10 Turkish universities rank among top 500, Hurriyet Daily News
- The report of inclusion of five Romanian universities in international rankings based on QS, URAP, U-maltirank, and other ranking systems.

=== URAP in university reports and websites ===
Annual URAP ranking results are used by a number of listed universities to indicate their academic performance. The following is a short list of links to university pages that has mentioned URAP results either independently or in conjunction with other ranking results.

- The comparison of the latest results and previous results of URAP, along with other ranking systems, Provided by the Polytechnic University of Catalonia.
- The profile of the rankings of Newcastle University from 2010 to 2014 and the current ranking results according to URAP and other ranking systems.
- URAP ranking results for top 16 universities of Thailand for 2013-2014 for Mahidol University . The report also includes the results for 2012-2013 and the results of all major ranking systems
- The report of the global standing of Seoul National University including the URAP results for 2014-2015
- On page 32 of the "Annual Report for the year ended March 31, 2013" of the University of Calgary has used URAP results for 2012 to compare the university with its top 5 peers.
- The report of the ranking of University of Pittsburgh based on URAP results since 2010.
- News report of the ranking of University College Dublin based in URAP and QS.
- Global ranking in 2011 of the Griffith University based in ARWU, QS, THE, Leiden, and URAP.
- On page 6 of the "Facts and Figures" report published by the University of Erlangen-Nuremberg URAP result is used to justify that their ranking in other systems is not a "one-off success story".

== Criticism ==
The indicators used in URAP are absolute values and size-dependent making it biased towards larger institutions. According to the “EUA report on Ranking for 2013“ published by the European University Association, URAP disregards books, excludes studies in arts and humanities areas, and under-represents social sciences. Furthermore, URAP does not employ any compensation for different publication cultures due to the lack of field-normalization of the results of bibliometric indicators. The report further states that “The results of the indicator on citation numbers in particular, as well as those on publication counts, are thus skewed towards the natural sciences and especially medicine.” It also states that excluding teaching indicators by URAP makes its focus solely on research-oriented institutions.

The “University Ranking Lists: A directory” report published by the Division for Analysis and Evaluation of the University of Gothenburg points out a problem that might arise from including more than 500 institutions in the ranking system. It states that “It [URAP] lists 2000 universities, and the purpose is to provide a ranking that covers not only institutions in the Western elite group. This purpose contrasts starkly with other ranking producers’ decisions not to publish more than the 400-500 top positions of their lists, since they do not consider their methods reliable below that level. [URAP] do not comment this problem.”

== See also ==
- College and university rankings
