= Lisa M. Schenck =

American judge

- Schenck in 2007

Judge of the United States Court of Military Commission Review
- Incumbent
- Assumed office August 16, 2019
- Appointed by: Donald Trump
- Preceded by: Seat established
- In office 2007–2008
- Appointed by: Robert Gates
- Preceded by: Seat established
- Succeeded by: David Conn

Personal details
- Born: Lisa Thibault
- Education: Providence College (BA); Fairleigh Dickinson University (MPA); University of Notre Dame (JD); Judge Advocate General's Legal Center and School (LLM); Yale University (LLM, JSD)

Lisa M. Schenck (née Thibault) is an American lawyer, academic, and judge of the United States Court of Military Commission Review. She has served as the associate dean for academic affairs at the George Washington University Law School since 2009. In March 2010, Schenck was appointed as a professorial lecturer in law, and teaches military justice. Prior to her career in academia, Schenck served in the United States Army Judge Advocate General's Corps for more than 25 years.

== Education ==
Schenck attended Providence College, graduating in 1983 with a Bachelor of Arts, and was commissioned in the U.S. Army Signal Corps.

Schenck received her Juris Doctor from Notre Dame Law School in 1989. She holds a Master of Public Administration from Fairleigh Dickinson University, from which she graduated in 1986. In 1995, she received her Master of Laws in Military Criminal Law from the U.S. Army Judge Advocate General's Legal Center and School. In 1998, Schenck received a second Master of Laws, this time in environmental law, from Yale Law School. In 2007, Schenck earned a Doctor of the Science of Law degree from Yale Law School, focusing on environmental law. Her military education includes the U.S. Army Signal Corps Officer Basic Course, The Judge Advocate General's Corps, United States Army Officer Basic and Graduate Courses, and graduate-level courses at the U.S. Army Combined Arms and Services Staff School, and the U.S. Army Command and General Staff College.

== Career ==
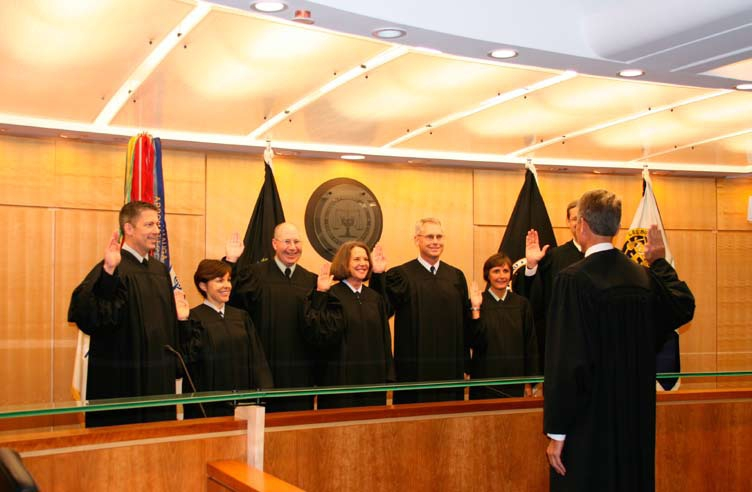
Swearing in judges on the Court of Military Commission Review. John Rolph swears in Paul Holden, Dawn Scholz, Steven Walburn, Amy Bechtold, Steve Thompson, Lisa Schenck, and Eric Geiser.

After retiring as a colonel with over two and a half decades of service in the United States Army Judge Advocate General's Corps, Schenck held the position of senior advisor to the Defense Task Force on Sexual Assault in the military services. During her more than 25-year career as a judge advocate, Schenck served an associate appellate judge and, later, senior appellate judge, on panel 3 of the U.S. Army Court of Criminal Appeals in Arlington, Virginia (2002–2008). From 2007 to 2008, Schenck was also an appellate judge on the United States Court of Military Commission Review. During her time on the bench, Schenck reviewed hundreds of cases for appellate error, and authored over 80 judicial opinions. Prior to her time as a sitting judge on these intermediate-level appellate courts, Schenck held numerous attorney positions.

While in the Washington, D.C., area, Schenck was an environmental law attorney at the U.S. Army Legal Services Agency in Arlington, Virginia (2000–2002), and the Executive Officer at the Criminal Law Division of the Office of the Judge Advocate General in Rosslyn, Virginia (1999–2000). In the mid to late 1990s, while at the United States Military Academy, Schenck served as the chief administrative and civil law attorney in the Office of the Staff Judge Advocate (1998–1999), and as an assistant professor of constitutional and military law.

Schenck spent over three years in the OSJA at the United States Army Aviation Center of Excellence at Fort Rucker, Alabama. There she served as the chief of both the Claims and Legal Assistance Divisions, the supervising special assistant U.S. attorney, the chief of the Criminal Law Division, and finally, the deputy staff judge advocate for the Aviation Center (1991–1994).

In the early 1990s, Schenck served for several years in South Korea. At Camp Humphreys, she served as the acting command judge advocate, and as a claims and legal assistance attorney for the 23rd Area Support Group (1991). Prior to those assignments, Schenck served as trial counsel and infantry brigade legal advisor at Camp Hovey, and as trial counsel and a legal assistance attorney at Camp Stanley for the 2md Infantry Division (1990–1991).

While an officer in the U.S. Army Signal Corps, Schenck held the positions of assistant fielding team chief and assistant secretary of the general staff for the U.S. Army Communications Electronics Command at Fort Monmouth, New Jersey (1983–1986). 2

== Federal judicial service ==
On August 27, 2018, President Donald Trump nominated Schenck to a seat on the United States Court of Military Commission Review. On August 1, 2019, her nomination was confirmed by the Senate by voice vote. She was sworn in on August 16, 2019.
