= Judge Pollard =

Judge Pollard may refer to:

- Robert Nelson Pollard (1880–1954), judge of the United States District Court for the Eastern District of Virginia
- William B. Pollard III (born 1947), judge of the United States Court of Military Commission Review

== See also ==
- Sir Lewis Pollard (c. 1465–1526), British justice of the Common Pleas
