= William Thaddeus Coleman Jr. =

American lawyer and judge (1920–2017)

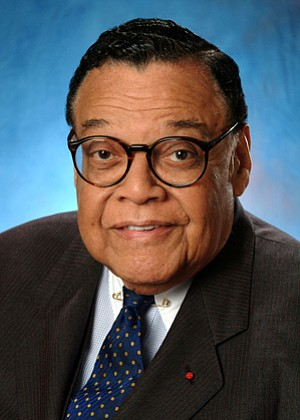

Judge of the United States Court of Military Commission Review
- In office September 21, 2004 – December 17, 2009
- Appointed by: George W. Bush
- Preceded by: Position established
- Succeeded by: Scott Silliman

4th United States Secretary of Transportation
- In office March 7, 1975 – January 20, 1977
- President: Gerald Ford
- Preceded by: Claude Brinegar
- Succeeded by: Brock Adams

Personal details
- Born: July 7, 1920 Philadelphia, Pennsylvania, U.S.
- Died: March 31, 2017 (aged 96) Alexandria, Virginia, U.S.
- Party: Republican
- Spouse: Lovida Hardin
- Children: 3, including William and Hardin
- Education: University of Pennsylvania (BA); Harvard University (LLB)

Military service
- Allegiance: United States
- Branch/service: United States Army; Army Air Corps
- Rank: Second Lieutenant
- Battles/wars: World War II

William Thaddeus Coleman Jr. (July 7, 1920 – March 31, 2017) was an American attorney and judge. Coleman was the fourth United States Secretary of Transportation, from March 7, 1975, to January 20, 1977, and the second African American to serve in the United States Cabinet. As an attorney, Coleman played a major role in significant civil rights cases. At the time of his death, Coleman was the oldest living former Cabinet member. (Note: Coleman was five months older than George P. Shultz.)

== Early life and education ==
Coleman was born to Laura Beatrice (née Mason) Coleman and William Thaddeus Coleman Sr. in Germantown, Philadelphia, Pennsylvania. Coleman's mother came from six generations of Episcopal ministers, including an operator of the Underground Railroad. W.E.B. DuBois and Langston Hughes would visit the family's home for dinner. One of seven black students at Germantown High School, Coleman was suspended for cursing at a teacher after she praised his honors presentation by saying, "Someday, William, you will make a wonderful chauffeur." When Coleman attempted to join the school's swim team he was again suspended, and the team disbanded after he returned so as to avoid admitting him, only to reform after he graduated. Coleman's swim team coach wrote him a strong letter of recommendation and he was accepted into the University of Pennsylvania, where he was a double major in political science and economics.

He graduated summa cum laude from the University of Pennsylvania with a B.A. in history in 1941. There, he was elected to Phi Beta Kappa society. He was elected to the Pi Gamma Mu international honor society in 1941. Coleman was also a member of Alpha Phi Alpha fraternity.

Coleman was accepted to the Harvard Law School but left in 1943 to enlist in the United States Army Air Forces, failing in his attempt to join the Tuskegee Airmen. Instead, Coleman spent the war defending the accused in courts-martial. After the war, Coleman returned to Harvard Law, where he became the third black staff member accepted to the Harvard Law Review, graduating first in his class and magna cum laude in 1946.

== Career ==
He began his legal career in 1947, serving as law clerk to Judge Herbert F. Goodrich of the U.S. Court of Appeals for the Third Circuit and U.S. Supreme Court Justice Felix Frankfurter in 1948. He was the first African American to serve as a Supreme Court law clerk. Fellow clerks, including Elliot Richardson, would have difficulty finding a restaurant where they could eat together.

Coleman was hired by the New York law firm of Paul, Weiss, Rifkind, Wharton & Garrison in 1949. Thurgood Marshall, then the chief counsel of the National Association for the Advancement of Colored People, recruited Coleman to be one of the lead strategists and coauthor of the legal brief in Brown v. Board of Education (1954), in which the U.S. Supreme Court held racial segregation in public schools to be unconstitutional.

William Coleman joined Philadelphia based firm, Dilworth Paxson, in 1951. Eventually becoming the first African-American lawyer admitted as a partner in a Philadelphia law firm. Mr. Coleman worked on libel suits within Dilworth Paxson's Litigation Department for The Inquirer and beyond. At this time, he also becomes a member of the Board of Directors of the NAACP’s Legal Defense Fund. before leaving the firm in 1971.

He served as a member of the NAACP's national legal committee, director and member of its executive committee, and president of board of the NAACP Legal Defense and Educational Fund. Coleman was also a member of President Dwight D. Eisenhower's Committee on Government Employment Policy (1959–1961) and a consultant to the U.S. Arms Control and Disarmament Agency (1963–1975). Coleman served as an assistant counsel to the President's Commission on the Assassination of President Kennedy (1964), also known as the Warren Commission, on which then-Congressman Gerald Ford was a commissioner.

During the Warren Commission's investigation into the assassination of John F. Kennedy, the commission received word via a backchannel that Fidel Castro, then Prime Minister of Cuba, wanted to talk to them. The Commission sent Coleman as an investigator and he met with Castro on a fishing boat off the coast of Cuba. Castro denied any involvement in the assassination of President Kennedy during Coleman's three-hour questioning. Coleman reported the results of his investigation and interview with Castro directly to Commission Chairman Earl Warren, the Chief Justice of the United States.

Coleman was co-counsel to the petitioners in McLaughlin v. Florida (1964), in which the Supreme Court unanimously struck down a law prohibiting an interracial couple from living together. In 1969, he was a member of the U.S. delegation to the twenty-fourth session of the United Nations General Assembly.

Coleman was also a member of the National Commission on Productivity (1971–1972). Coleman served in the boardrooms of PepsiCo, IBM, Chase Manhattan Bank, and Pan American World Airways. He was senior partner in the law firm of Dilworth, Paxson, Kalish, Levy & Coleman at the time of his appointment to the Ford Administration.

In 1973, Coleman became the first Black member of the Union League of Philadelphia.

=== Cabinet post ===
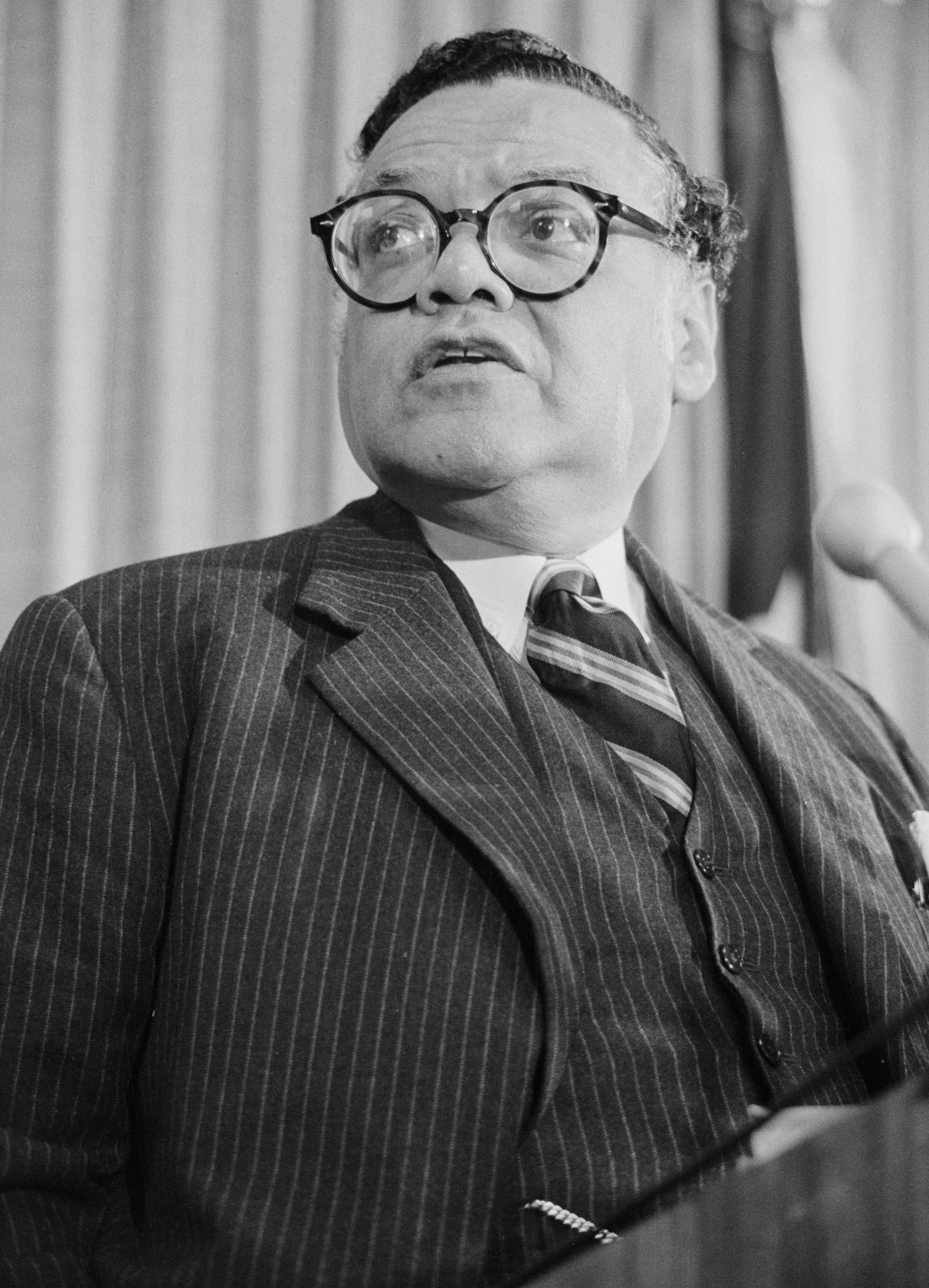
William T. Coleman in 1976, speaking at a press conference discussing supersonic transport

President Gerald Ford appointed Coleman to serve in his Cabinet as the fourth Secretary of Transportation on March 7, 1975. During Coleman's time at the Department of Transportation, the National Highway Traffic Safety Administration's automobile test facility at East Liberty, Ohio commenced operations, and the department established the Materials Transportation Bureau to address pipeline safety and the safe shipment of hazardous materials. In February 1976, Coleman authorized a testing period for the supersonic Concorde jet, and flights began on May 24. After the Port Authority of New York and New Jersey banned the jet, the U.S. Supreme Court restored Coleman's authorization. In December 1976, Coleman rejected consumer activists' pressure for a federal mandate on automobile airbags and instead announced a two-year demonstration period favored by the auto industry. Coleman's tenure ended in January 1977, after Jimmy Carter won the 1976 election.

=== Post-Cabinet service and honors ===
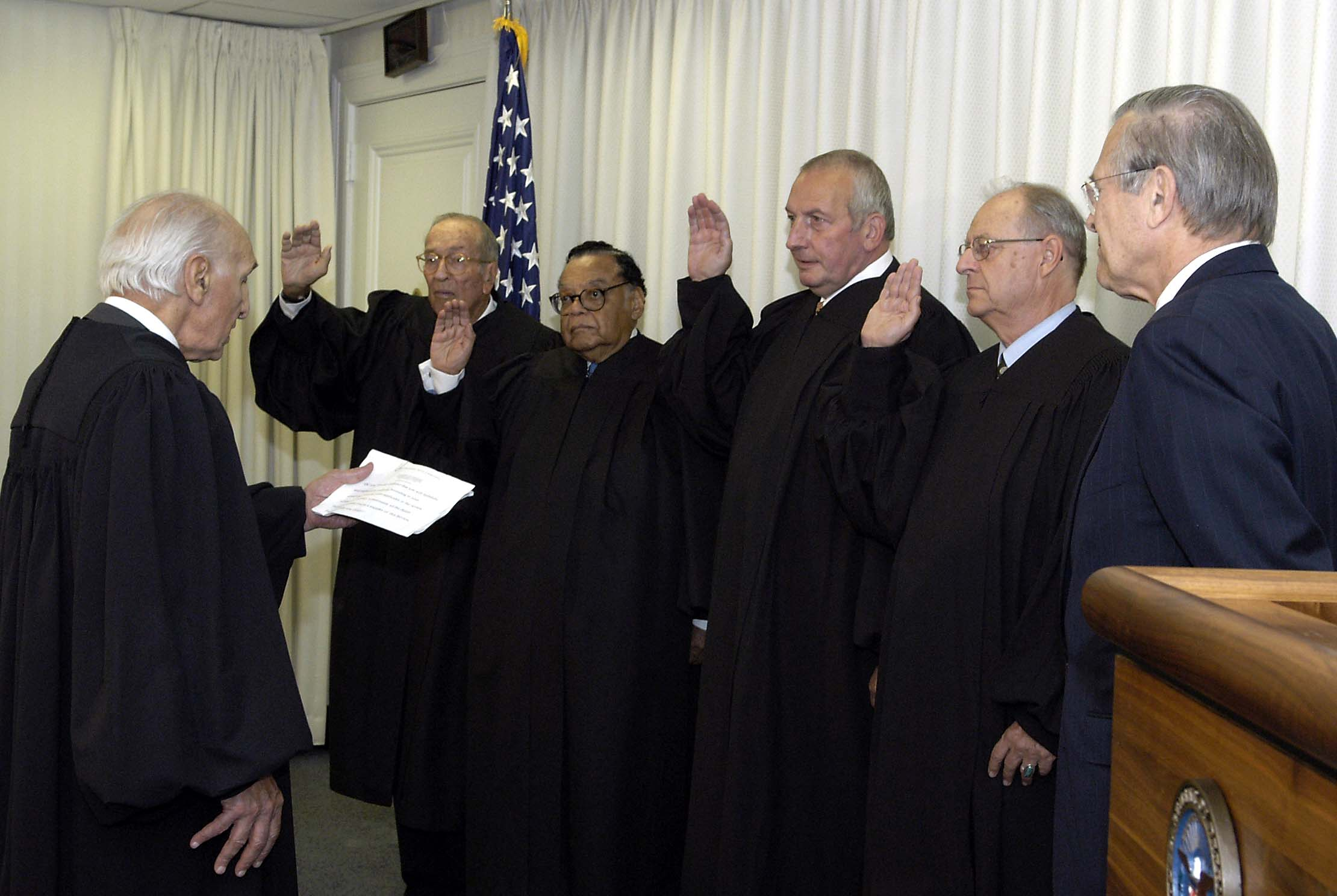
Coleman, third from the left, being sworn into the United States Court of Military Commission Review.

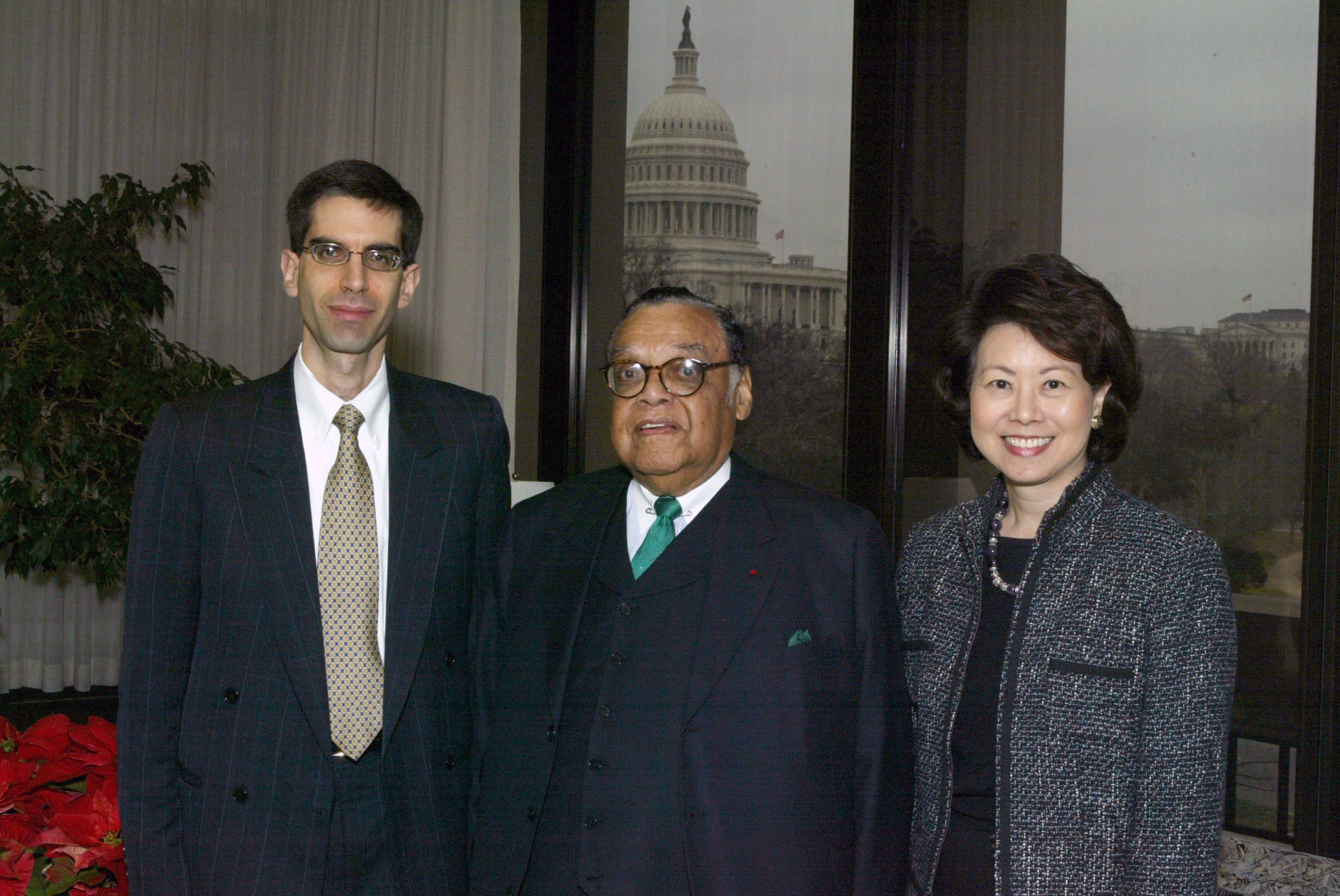
Elaine Chao Meets with Bill Coleman

On leaving the department, Coleman returned to Philadelphia and subsequently became a partner in the Washington office of the Los Angeles-based law firm O'Melveny & Myers. Colman argued a total of 19 cases before the Supreme Court. He appeared for the respondent in the argument and reargument of Garcia v. San Antonio Metropolitan Transit Authority (1985). In 1983, with the election quickly approaching, the Reagan administration stopped supporting the IRS's position against Bob Jones University that overtly discriminatory groups were ineligible for certain tax exemptions. Coleman was appointed to argue the now unsupported lower court position before the Supreme Court, and won in Bob Jones University v. United States.

Coleman was elected to the American Academy of Arts and Sciences in 1993. On September 29, 1995, Coleman was presented with the Presidential Medal of Freedom by President Bill Clinton. After the July 17, 1996, crash of TWA Flight 800, he served on the President's Commission on Airline and Airport Security. Coleman received an honorary LL.D. from Bates College in 1975. Coleman was also awarded honorary degrees from, among others, Williams College in May 1975, Gettysburg College on May 22, 2011, and Boston University in May 2012.

Coleman was elected to the American Philosophical Society in 2001.

In September 2004, President George W. Bush appointed Coleman to the United States Court of Military Commission Review.

In June 2006, Coleman received the Golden Plate Award of the American Academy of Achievement.

In December 2006, Coleman served as an honorary pallbearer during the state funeral of Gerald Ford in Washington, D.C.

In June 2024, the William T. Coleman, Jr. Foundation, Inc. honored the legacy of William T. Coleman, Jr., Esq. with the unveiling of a sculpture that is now permanently displayed at the National Constitution Center in Philadelphia.

== Personal life ==
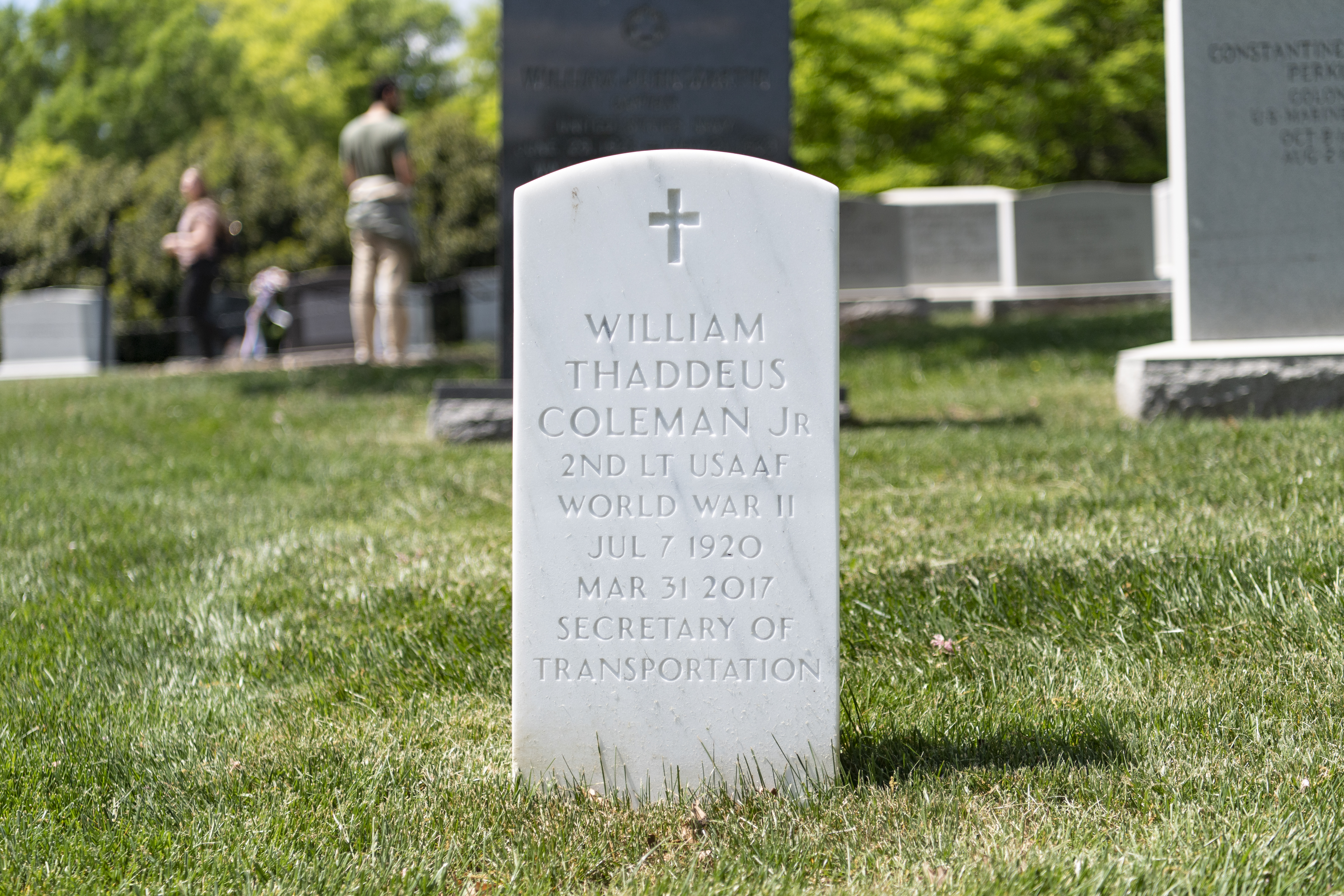
Grave at Arlington National Cemetery

In 1945, Coleman married Lovida Mae Hardin (1923–2020). They had three children: Lovida H. Coleman, Jr. (1949–2018); William Thaddeus Coleman III, a General Counsel of the Army under President Clinton and stepfather of Flavia Colgan; and Hardin Coleman, a professor at Boston University School of Education.

Coleman Jr. died from complications of Alzheimer's disease at his home in Alexandria, Virginia, on March 31, 2017, aged 96.

== See also ==
- List of African-American United States Cabinet members
- List of law clerks for the second seat of the Supreme Court of the United States

== Notes ==
Political offices
| Preceded by Claude Brinegar | United States Secretary of Transportation; 1975–1977 | Succeeded by Brock Adams |
Legal offices
| New seat | Judge of the United States Court of Military Commission Review; 2004–2009 | Succeeded by Scott Silliman |
