= Sue Allen Warren =

American clinical psychologist (1917–1997)

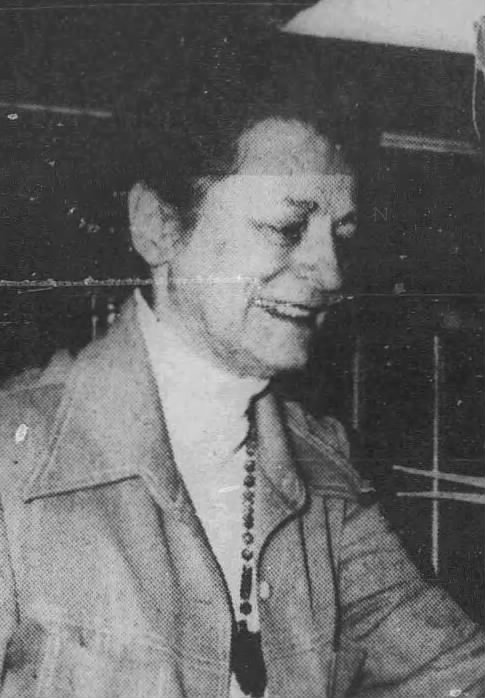
- Warren in 1976
- Born: December 2, 1917; North Carolina, U.S.
- Died: November 16, 1997 (aged 79)
- Education: East Carolina University; Duke University; State University of Iowa
- Children: 1
- Scientific career
- Fields: Clinical psychology
- Workplaces: University at Buffalo; University of Illinois; Boston University
- Doctoral advisor: Boyd R. McCandless
- Doctoral students: Celeste Freytes

Sue Allen Warren (December 2, 1917 – November 16, 1997) was an American clinical psychologist and educator known for her contributions to the field of intellectual and developmental disabilities. She retired from Boston University as an emeritus professor in 1988.

== Early life and education ==
Warren was born in North Carolina on December 2, 1917. She earned her bachelor's degree in education from East Carolina University in 1939. She later obtained a master's degree in clinical psychology from Duke University in 1951 and a Ph.D. in child development and sociology from the State University of Iowa in 1955. Her dissertation was titled, Ethnocentrism, Reported Parent Attitudes, and Parent Child Relationships. Boyd R. McCandless was her doctoral advisor.

== Career ==
Warren began her career as an elementary school teacher in rural North Carolina. She later served as the director of psychological services and research in the Williamsville Central School District. Warren was a professor at the University at Buffalo.

From 1959 to 1963, Warren was the director of the psychology department at the Oregon Fairview Home. In 1964, she received a Capper Award for Service in Mental Retardation from the Oregon Association for Retarded Children. She then became an associate professor at the Abraham Lincoln School of Medicine, University of Illinois, where she also directed psychological services at the Illinois State Pediatric Institute.

In 1969, Warren moved to Massachusetts to become the Region V Administrator for the Department of Mental Health. She joined Boston University (BU) as a full-time faculty member in 1970, where she held various positions including coordinator of the mental retardation program from 1972 to 1974, chair of the department of special education from 1974 to 1979, and director of the division of special and counselor education from 1979 to 1980. Warren retired from BU in 1988 as an emeritus professor.

In the American Psychological Association (APA), Warren raised awareness about intellectual disabilities. She served on the APA's Council of Representatives from 1961 1963 and various task forces and committees related to intellectual disabilities. Warren was a life member of the American Association on Mental Retardation (AAMR), serving in various roles including as president from 1975 to 1976. She was the editor of the journal Mental Retardation from 1970 to 1982. Warren was a fellow of the AAMR.

== Personal life ==
Warren had a son. After retiring, she became a state debate judge in Rhode Island, inspired by her grandchildren's interest in debate. Warren died in her sleep on November 16, 1997.
