= Celeste Freytes =

Puerto Rican academic administrator (born 1950)

- Born: 1950 (age 75–76); Santurce, Puerto Rico
- Other name: Celeste Freytes-Dieppa

Academic background
- Education: Boston University School of Education (Ed.D.)
- Doctoral advisor: Sue Allen Warren

Academic work
- Discipline: Higher education
- Institutions: University of Puerto Rico

Celeste E. Freytes González (born 1950) is a Puerto Rican academic administrator who served as the interim president of the University of Puerto Rico in 2013 and again from 2016 to 2017. She has served a commissioner on the Middle States Commission on Higher Education.

== Life ==
Freytes was born in 1950. She completed a Ed.D. at Boston University School of Education. Her 1977 thesis was titled, Paired-Associate Learning with Spanish and English Mediation in a Bilingual Population. Sue Allen Warren was her doctoral advisor. Her study found that verbal mediation significantly improved paired-associate learning in bilingual children, with English mediation yielding better results than Spanish mediation, regardless of the children's language proficiency.

By 1976, Freytes was working in the department of reading and language at the BU School of Education and was a member of The Society for the Study of the Multi-Ethnic Literature of the United States (MELUS). The following year she was an assistant professor of education at Boston University. Freytes began teaching at the University of Puerto Rico, Río Piedras Campus in 1979. She has been involved in various projects focused on higher education and the self-study process.

In 2013, Freytes was a member of Puerto Rico Governor Alejandro Garcia Padilla's transitional team before he took office as governor; Garcia Padilla contacted her directly about becoming interim president of the University of Puerto Rico (UPR) before she was named to the position. In January 2016, she began her first term as a commissioner on the Middle States Commission on Higher Education.

Freytes has held multiple administrative positions at UPR, including vice president for academic affairs. She first served as interim president from September to November 2013 and was appointed to the position again in February 2016, following the resignation of former president Uroyoán Walker after a controversy regarding the awarding of presidential scholarships for the 2015 to 2016 academic year. During her second term as interim president, Freytes focused on managing the university's financial difficulties, developing a new strategic plan for 2016 to 2021, and ensuring compliance with accreditation standards from the Middle States Commission on Higher Education.

Freytes Gonzalez announced on February 16, 2017, that she and other UPR leaders were renouncing from their positions, a move that was investigated by the Puerto Rican senate. She was succeeded by Nivia Fernández Hernández as interim president of the UPR.
