= Eric Montalvo =

American lawyer

Eric Montalvo is an American lawyer who retired after 21 years of active duty service from the United States Marine Corps as a "Mustang" Major and JAG officer.

He is notable for questioning whether the Department of Justice and Department of Defense should rely on paid witnesses when trying to assemble a new case against his client, Mohammed Jawad. His work on the case was featured in the February 2011 issue of GQ magazine.

== Education ==
Montalvo has a Bachelor of Science from the University of South Carolina and a Juris Doctor from Temple University School of Law.

== Legal career ==
Montalvo is Founding Partner of The Federal Practice Group. His areas of practice are military law, security clearance law, international corporate law, and white collar crime.

=== Guantanamo hitch ===
On July 22, 2009, US District Court Judge Ellen Huvelle granted Jawad's habeas corpus petition, ruling that all the evidence against him was inadmissible, because it was triggered by torture. The Department of Justice requested time to lay new charges against Jawad, based on witness statements that had not been available during the previous five years he had been in custody. On August 4, 2009, the Washington Independent reported that Montalvo and lead counsel David Frakt reported that the new prosecution witnesses had received gifts or cash in return for their testimony.

On August 28, 2009, Jeremy Page, writing in The Times, reported that Montalvo was planning to represent Jawad in a lawsuit against the US government. Page reported that Montalvo was scheduled to retire from the Marine Corps within the next month.

On September 21, 2009, historian Andy Worthington, author of The Guantanamo Files, published a letter from Montalvo's colleague Frakt, that explained Montalvo's role in more detail. He wrote that, initially, Jawad's Defense team was going to hire a private investigator to travel to Afghanistan to conduct their own investigation, because so much of the evidence in the case had disappeared. It was only when Susan Crawford declined to budget for a private investigator that Montalvo made plans to serve as the team's investigator.

=== Defense of Adam Winfield ===
Adam Winfield is a soldier who faces charges that he participated in a thrill kill murder ring in Afghanistan. Montalvo is serving as his attorney. Montalvo and Winfield's father have asserted that Winfield was not a willing participant in the conspiracy, that he was one of the whistleblowers who had tried to report the ring. A documentary was produced detailing Winfield's story, and is called The Kill Team. The film won first place in the category of Best Documentary Feature at the 2013 Tribeca Film Festival.

=== Afghanistan evacuation ===
Montalvo and his Federal Practice Group were involved in the 2021 evacuation from Afghanistan, chartering a plane from Mazar-i-Sharif to Doha. The flight was called "rogue", containing "300 people of unknown nationalities" as it wasn't expected or documented. It didn't have landing rights for Doha, but was able to land.
