= Claude Brinegar =

American government official (1926–2009)

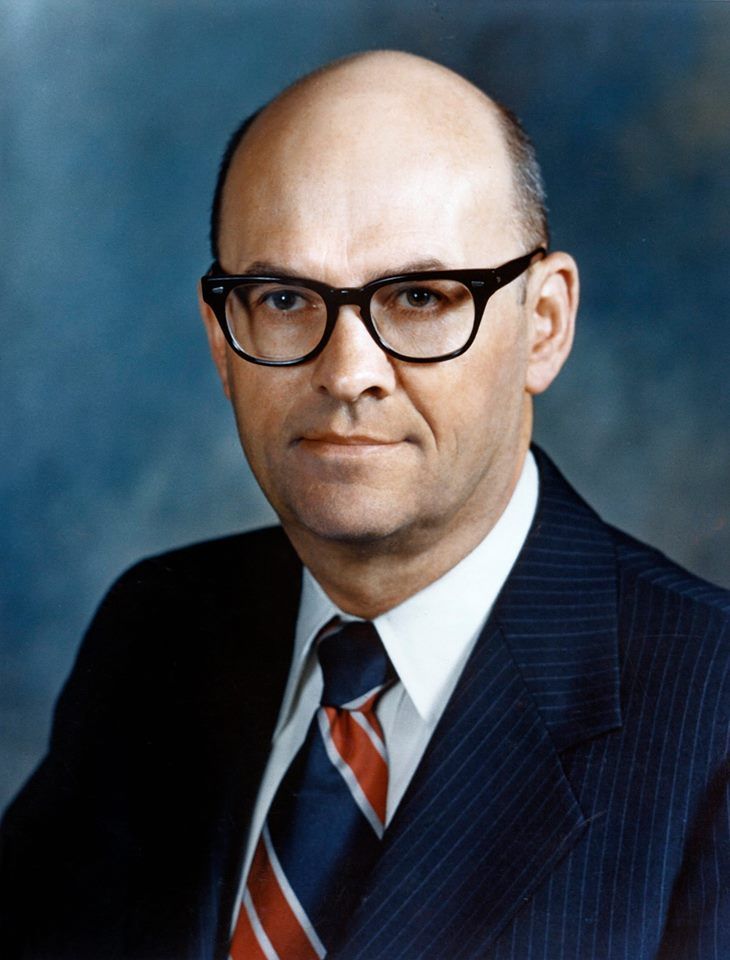

3rd United States Secretary of Transportation
- In office February 2, 1973 – February 1, 1975
- President: Richard Nixon; Gerald Ford
- Preceded by: John A. Volpe
- Succeeded by: William Thaddeus Coleman Jr.

Personal details
- Born: Claude Stout Brinegar; December 16, 1926 Rockport, California, U.S.
- Died: March 13, 2009 (aged 82) Palo Alto, California, U.S.
- Party: Republican
- Education: Stanford University (BA, MS, PhD)

Military service
- Allegiance: United States
- Branch/service: United States Army
- Years of service: 1945–1947

Claude Stout Brinegar (December 16, 1926 – March 13, 2009) was the third United States Secretary of Transportation, serving from February 2, 1973, to February 1, 1975. Holding a PhD from Stanford University in economic research, Brinegar had previously been an oil company executive. Brinegar was Secretary of Transportation during the 1973 oil crisis.

== Early life and education ==
Claude Brinegar was born Claude Rawles Stout on December 16, 1926, to Lyle Rawles Stout and Claude Leroy Stout in Rockport, California, a small lumber town on the coast, 25 miles north of Fort Bragg. After her husband abandoned her and her toddler, Lyle Stout got a teaching job on an Indian reservation. Following her marriage, in 1932, to Butler Brinegar, the boy had a disjointed education, attending a different school each year as his stepfather moved around Northern California for jobs with the Works Progress Administration and other agencies. He legally took his stepfather's last name in 1951. He served in the United States Army, 1945–47, then attended Stanford University, where he received a B.A. in Economics with Great Distinction (1950), an M.S. in Mathematics and Statistics (1951), and a Ph.D. in economic research (1953). He was also elected to Phi Beta Kappa. While pursuing his Ph.D., Mr. Brinegar was a research assistant with the Food Research Institute in Stanford, California, and an Economic Consultant to the Emporium-Capwell Corporation in San Francisco, California.

Brinegar joined the Union Oil Company (later called Unocal Corporation) in 1953 as an economic analyst and held several positions in economics, planning and research until 1965, when he was elected vice president for corporate planning. In October 1965, Union Oil and the Pure Oil Company merged. Brinegar was appointed president of Pure Oil and remained in that position when Pure became Union 76. He was also elected senior vice president of the firm and a member of Union Oil's board of directors and executive committee.

== Political life ==
Brinegar was nominated to the post of United States Secretary of Transportation by Richard Nixon. Dr. Brinegar was the third person to take the post of Secretary of Transportation and followed John A. Volpe, a former governor in Massachusetts. Brinegar had never held political office before taking this post, but cited his education and experience as a consumer as credentials that made him suitable for the job. He was quoted “I've flown a million miles in the last seven years, and I've sat on the Harbor Freeway for hours in traffic jams”, implying that his firsthand knowledge of the issues regarding transportation would help him find effective solutions. He also served under Gerald Ford, but when Ford announced he intended to seek the presidency, Brinegar resigned and returned to an executive position at Union Oil. In 1980–81, Brinegar was on Ronald Reagan's transition team.

=== 1973 oil crisis ===
Brinegar was Secretary of Transportation during the Arab oil embargo in 1973 and was tasked with mitigating the crisis during this period. He passed the Emergency Highway Conservation Act with president Nixon which set a speed limit of 55 miles an hour on all highways in order to reduce oil usage. During this time Brinegar also promoted carpooling nationwide in order to help reduce oil usage. Another of Brinegar's chief legislative accomplishments was the Federal Aid Highway Act of 1973, which allocated federal funds for states to improve and maintain their highways.

== Death ==
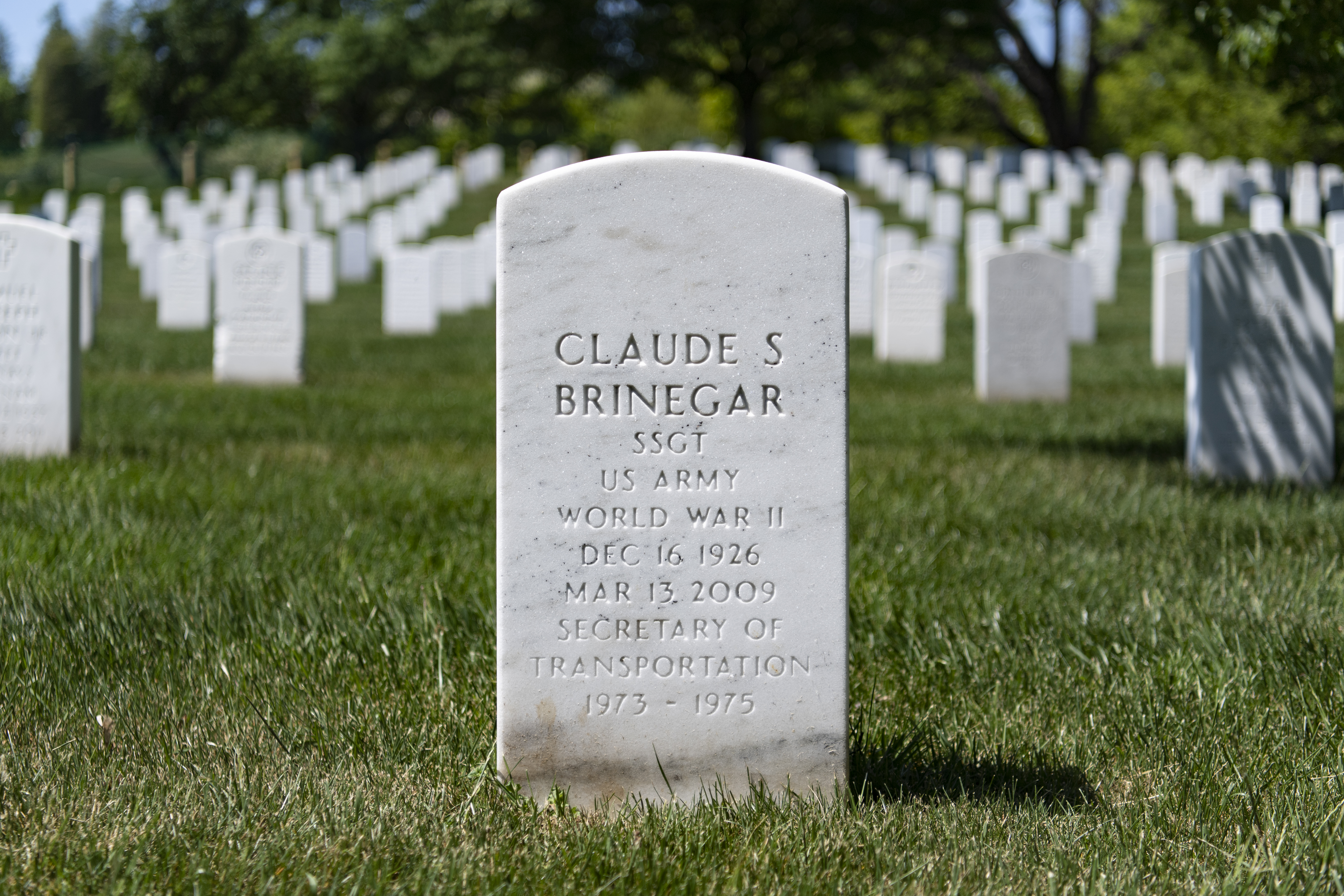
Gravesite of United States Army Staff Sergeant Claude Brinegar in Section 31 of Arlington National Cemetery in 2024

Brinegar died of natural causes aged 82 at a retirement home in Palo Alto, California, on March 13, 2009. He is survived by his wife, three children, and four grandchildren.

Political offices
Preceded by John Anthony Volpe	U.S. Secretary of Transportation; Served under: Richard Nixon and Gerald Ford; 1973–1975	Succeeded by William Thaddeus Coleman, Jr.
