= Scott Silliman =

American judge and political scientist (born 1943)

Judge of the United States Court of Military Commission Review
- In office September 12, 2012 – 2023
- Appointed by: Barack Obama
- Preceded by: William Coleman

Personal details
- Born: 1943 (age 82–83)
- Education: University of North Carolina, Chapel Hill (BA, JD)

Scott Livingston Silliman (born 1943) is a professor emeritus of the Practice of Law at Duke Law School, and emeritus executive director of Duke Law School's Center on Law, Ethics and National Security. He was also an adjunct professor of law at the University of North Carolina at Chapel Hill (UNC), and at North Carolina Central University.

== Academic career ==
Silliman earned a bachelor's degree in philosophy at the University of North Carolina in 1965 followed by a J.D. degree in 1968. While there he participated in the ROTC program. Upon graduation, he began a 25-year career as a military lawyer, in the United States Air Force. When he retired, in 1993, he joined the faculty at the Duke Law School. He was the first executive director of Duke's Center on Law, Ethics and National Security, a position he held for 18 years.

== Career ==
Silliman was a military attorney, called to active duty as an U.S. Air Force judge advocate in 1968, and later a staff judge advocate (senior attorney) and, in his last assignments, the senior attorney for Tactical Air Command and later Air Combat Command. In 1993, he retired from the Air Force as a colonel.

Silliman is an expert on national security law, military law, and the law of armed conflict.

His views have been cited in various media, including by The New York Times, The Washington Post, The Boston Globe, The Christian Science Monitor, Newsweek, The Guardian, NPR, USA Today, and the New York Daily News. In 2012 Silliman was appointed by then President Obama and later confirmed by the Senate as an appellate judge on the US Court of Military Commission Review, (USMCRC), a blue ribbon panel created solely to review rulings and verdicts from the Guantanamo Military Commissions.

During the final part of the rescue of the crew of Maersk Alabama three of the four pirates retreated to the vessel's lifeboat, taking the Captain as a hostage, together with $30,000 from the ship's safe. According to widely publicized accounts of the Captain's rescue, when snipers heard a firearms discharge, on the lifeboat, three snipers each killed one of the pirates with a single shot. It emerged, during the trial of the remaining pirate, that the Captain could hear the labored breathing of at least one injured pirate. During the trial Philip L. Weinstein said that an expert on firearms wounds who examined photos of the dead pirates said they had been shot 19 times. Weinstein argued that the SEALS had violated their obligations, under the Geneva Conventions, to refrain from further injuring enemy combatants, who were too injured to further participate in hostilities. According to Fox News Silliman defended the SEALs, stating that "the SEALs had to make the assumption that the Somalis were armed and a continuing threat. In other words, they were still combatants."

An opinion Silliman offered on the guilt of Khaled Sheikh Mohammed, and his four co-defendants, in the 9-11 Guantanamo Military Commission triggered a civilian appeals court to overrule the USCMCR. The civilian appeals court agreed with the defendants that since Silliman had voiced an opinion, in a 2010 telephone interview with the BBC two years before he was appointed to the court, that the five were guilty, that he was biased, and should have recused himself.

== Works ==
=== Select articles ===
- "Robinson O. Everett and National Security", 59 DUKE L. J. 1447 (2010)
- "Prosecuting Alleged Terrorists by Military Commission: A Prudent Option", 42 CASE W. RES. J. INT'L L. 289 (2009)
- "On Military Commissions", 36 CASE W. RES. J. INT'L L. 529 (2004)
- "Troubling Questions in Interrogating Terrorists", 90 DUKE MAG., September–October 2004
- "Detaining Terrorists at Guantanamo Bay: Questions of Law and Policy", 25 NAT'L SEC. L. REP. 1 (2003)
- "The Iraqi Quagmire: Enforcing the No-Fly Zones", 36 NEW ENG. L. REV. 767 (2002)

=== Testimony to the Senate ===
- Testimony on Hamdan v. Rumsfield: Establishing a Constitutional Process", U.S. Senate Committee on the Judiciary, July 11, 2006

== Major service awards ==
- Legion of Merit
- Meritorious Service Medal with four oak leaf clusters
- Air Force Commendation Medal with one oak leaf cluster

Legal offices
Preceded by William Coleman	Judge of the United States Court of Military Commission Review; 2012–present	Incumbent
