= Nivia Fernández Hernández =

Puerto Rican dietetics and nutrition professor

President of the University of Puerto Rico
- Interim
- In office February 21, 2017 – May 2017
- Preceded by: Celeste Freytes (interim)
- Succeeded by: Darrel Hillman Barrera (interim)

Personal details
- Born: February 26, 1955 (age 71) San Juan, Puerto Rico
- Children: 2
- Education: University of Puerto Rico (BSc, EdD); Emory University (MSc)

Nivia Aurora Fernández Hernández is a Puerto Rican dietetics and nutrition professor at the University of Puerto Rico, Río Piedras Campus. She has expertise in nutrition, gerontology, and higher education. She was the interim president of the University of Puerto Rico in 2017.

== Education ==
Fernández Hernández earned a B.Sc. in nutrition and dietetics from the University of Puerto Rico in 1975. She completed an internship in dietetics at Emory University School of Medicine, Division of Allied Health Professions in 1977. She obtained a Master of Medical Science (M.M.Sc.) with a focus on nutrition and dietetics and the Administration of Food Service Systems from Emory University in 1979.

Fernández Hernández earned a graduate certificate in gerontology from the Graduate School of Public Health at the University of Puerto Rico, Medical Sciences Campus in June 1993. She received an Ed.D. with a health sciences curriculum specialization from the University of Puerto Rico, Río Piedras Campus (UPR-RP) in 1999. Her dissertation was titled, The Theory of Adult Education: Comparative Analysis of Models and Their Applications in Higher Education in Puerto Rico. César Rosario was her doctoral advisor.

== Career ==
=== Early career ===
Fernández Hernández began her career in academia as an instructor at UPR-RP in 1979. She was promoted to assistant professor in 1987 and later to associate professor in 1992. Her early academic work was centered in the School of Domestic Economy, where she taught in the area of food and nutrition. During this time, she also served as an advisor to the School Division of Public Cafeterias under the Department of Public Instruction of Puerto Rico.

From 1987 to 1992, she served as the assistant director of the UPR School of Domestic Economy. In 1990, she was appointed interim director of the school, a role she held until 1993. In addition to her academic duties, Fernández Hernández provided advisory services in nutrition for the Department of Health of Puerto Rico during the 1993 Central American and Caribbean Games. She was also a consultant for the Puerto Rican Health Department's implementation of a Coordinated Care Model as part of the health reform process.

Her academic career progressed with her appointment as interim associate dean for student affairs at the Faculty of Education in 1994, and later as interim assistant dean for academic affairs from 1994 to 1998. In 1999, she was named associate dean for academic affairs, continuing her administrative leadership within the university. Alongside her administrative responsibilities, Fernández Hernández maintained her academic involvement as a professor, receiving a sabbatical from 1998 to 1999 to complete her doctoral dissertation on adult education theory and its application to higher education in Puerto Rico. She resumed her duties in December 1999, also holding the title of full professor at the School of Family Ecology and Nutrition within the Faculty of Education. Fernández Hernández was the vice president of academic affairs of the University of Puerto Rico (UPR). In this role, she contributed to the development of the 2017 to 2022 strategic plan.

=== University of Puerto Rico presidency ===
On February 21, 2017, she became the UPR interim president, succeeding interim president Celeste Freytes. She was appointed following the resignation of Freytes and several top officials. Her appointment came during a period of intense financial challenges for the university system, which was facing significant budget cuts as part of broader austerity measures aimed at addressing Puerto Rican government-debt crisis. During her tenure, a student strike protesting the proposed cuts shut down the university's campuses, with demonstrators blocking access. The strike, which began in March 2017, was sparked by a proposed $450 million reduction to UPR's budget, later adjusted to $241 million in negotiations. Fernández Hernández faced legal pressure to resolve the situation, including a judge's threat of arrest if the university did not reopen by May 11. Despite her efforts to find a resolution, the institution remained closed, and daily fines were imposed.

On May 23, 2017, Fernández resigned as interim president, just before a potential arrest. She cited the ongoing difficulties in reopening the university amid the strike. Several members of the UPR board of governors also resigned in protest of the financial situation. The university remained closed for some time after her departure, and multiple campuses were placed on probation due to the disruptions caused by the strike. She was succeeded by interim president Darrel Hillman Barrera.

=== Later career ===
On January 1, 2022, Fernández Hernández became the interim dean of academic affairs at UPR. She is a Registered Dietitian Nutritionist (RDN), Licensed Nutritionist/Dietitian (LDN), and holds is Certified Family and Consumer Sciences (CFCS) by the American Association of Family and Consumer Sciences. She is a full professor of dietetics and nutrition at the UPRRP College of Natural Sciences. She is the coordinator of its Master of Science in Nutrition and Dietetics with Supervised Experiential Learning (MSND-SEL).

== Personal life ==
Fernández Hernández has two children.
