= United States Court of Military Commission Review =

- (C.M.C.R.)
- Location: Washington, D.C.
- Appeals to: District of Columbia Circuit
- Appeals from: Guantanamo military commissions
- Established: 2006
- Authority: Article I tribunal
- Created by: Military Commissions Act of 2006; 10 U.S.C. § 950f
- Composition method: Presidential nomination with Senate advice and consent (or commissioned officers serving as military judges)
- Chief Judge: Lisa M. Schenck
- www.mc.mil

The Military Commissions Act of 2006 mandated that rulings from the Guantanamo military commissions could be appealed to a Court of Military Commission Review (CMCR), which would sit in Washington, D.C.

In any event, the CMCR was not ready when it was first needed. Peter Brownback and Keith J. Allred, the officers appointed to serve as Presiding Officers in the Military Commissions that charged Omar Khadr and Salim Ahmed Hamdan, dismissed the charges against the two men because the Military Commissions Act only authorized the commissions to try "unlawful enemy combatants". Khadr and Hamdan, like 570 other Guantanamo captives had merely been confirmed to be "enemy combatants".

The Court of Military Commission Review ruled that Presiding Officers were, themselves, authorized to rule whether suspects were "illegal enemy combatants".

To be eligible for a seat on the Court of Military Commission Review, candidates must currently be serving as a judge on either the Army Court of Criminal Appeals, the Air Force Court of Criminal Appeals, the Navy-Marine Corps Court of Criminal Appeals, or be nominated by the President of the United States. In 2016, all judges on the court began receiving presidential appointments with Senate confirmations.

== Current composition of the court ==
The judges on the court as of October 31, 2026:

| # | Judge | Military branch | Term of service | | | Appointed by |
| # | Judge | Military branch | Active | Chief | Deputy chief | Appointed by |
|---|---|---|---|---|---|---|
| 52 | Lisa M. Schenck | Civilian | 2019–present | 2022–present | — | Trump |
| 56 | LaJohnne A. Morris | Army | 2023–present | — | 2025–present | Biden |
| 60 | Peter G. Juetten | Army | 2025–present | — | — | Trump |
| 62 | Brian D. Korn | Navy | 2025–present | — | — | Trump |
| 63 | Keaton H. Harrell | Marine Corps | 2025–present | — | — | Trump |
| 64 | Sara R. De Groot | Navy | 2025–present | — | — | Trump |
| 65 | Christopher S. Morgan | Air Force | 2025–present | — | — | Trump |
| 66 | Kristin K. B. McCall | Air Force | 2025–present | — | — | Trump |

== Former judges ==
| # | Judge | Military branch | Term of service | | | Appointed by |
| # | Judge | Military branch | Active | Chief | Deputy chief | Appointed by |
|---|---|---|---|---|---|---|
| 1 | Griffin Bell | Civilian | 2004–2007 | 2004–2007 | — | Rumsfeld |
| 2 | Edward G. Biester Jr. | Civilian | 2004–2007 | — | — | Rumsfeld |
| 3 | William Thaddeus Coleman Jr. | Civilian | 2004–2009 | — | — | Rumsfeld |
| 4 | Frank J. Williams | Civilian | 2004–2009 | 2007–2009 | — | Rumsfeld |
| 5 | Amy Bechtold | Air Force | 2007–? | — | — | Gates |
| 6 | John Feltham | Marine Corps | 2007–? | — | — | Gates |
| 7 | David R. Francis | Air Force | 2007–? | — | — | Gates |
| 8 | Eric E. Geiser | Navy | 2007–? | — | — | Gates |
| 9 | Paul P. Holden Jr. | Army | 2007–? | — | — | Gates |
| 10 | Daniel E. O'Toole | Navy | 2007–2011 | 2009–2011 | — | Gates |
| 11 | John Rolph | Navy | 2007–2008 | — | 2007–2008 | Gates |
| 12 | Lisa M. Schenck | Army | 2007–2008 | — | — | Gates |
| 13 | Dawn Scholz | Air Force | 2007–? | — | — | Gates |
| 14 | Annamary Sullivan | Army | 2007–? | — | — | Gates |
| 15 | Steven Thompson | Air Force | 2007–? | — | — | Gates |
| 16 | Steven Walburn | Army | 2007–? | — | — | Gates |
| 17 | Barbara G. Brand | Air Force | 2008–2011 | — | — | Gates |
| 18 | David Conn | Army | 2008–2012/2013 | — | — | Gates |
| 19 | Eric C. Price | Navy | 2008–2013/2014 | 2012–2013/2014 | — | Gates |
| 20 | Cheryl H. Thompson | Air Force | 2008–2011 | — | — | Gates |
| 21 | John B. Hoffman | Army | 2010–2011 | — | — | Gates |
| 22 | Martin L. Sims | Army | 2010–2012/2013 | — | — | Gates |
| 23 | Theresa A. Gallagher | Army | 2010–2013/2014 | — | — | Gates |
| 24 | Joseph R. Perlak | Marine Corps | 2010–2012/2013 | — | — | Gates |
| 25 | Ronald A. Gregory | Air Force | 2011–2013/2014 | — | — | Gates |
| 26 | William E. Orr Jr. | Air Force | 2011–2011/2012 | — | — | Gates |
| 27 | J. Bradley Roan | Air Force | 2012–2013/2014 | — | — | Panetta |
| 28 | Jan E. Aldykiewicz | Army | 2012–2013/2014 | — | — | Panetta |
| 29 | Eric Krauss | Army | 2012–2015 | 2014–2015 | — | Panetta |
| 30 | Mary E. Harney | Air Force | 2012–2013/2014 | — | — | Panetta |
| 31 | Moira Modzelewski | Navy | 2012–2013/2014 | — | — | Panetta |
| 32 | R. Quincy Ward | Marine Corps | 2012–2014 | — | — | Panetta |
| 33 | Scott Silliman | Civilian | 2012–2023 | — | 2014–2023 | Obama |
| 34 | William B. Pollard III | Civilian | 2012–2025 | — | — | Obama |
| 35 | Jeremy S. Weber | Air Force | 2014–2015 | — | — | Hagel |
| 36 | Kurt J. Brubaker | Marine Corps | 2014–2016 | — | — | Hagel |
| 37 | Thomas D. Cook | Army | 2014–2016 | — | — | Hagel |
| 38 | Mark Tellitocci | Army | 2014–2015 | — | — | Hagel |
| 39 | Donald C. King | Navy | 2014–2016 | — | — | Hagel, Obama |
| 40 | Martin T. Mitchell | Air Force | 2014–2016 | — | — | Hagel, Obama |
| 41 | Mark L. Allred | Air Force | 2014–2016 | — | — | Hagel |
| 42 | Paulette V. Burton | Army | 2015–2022 | 2017–2022 | — | Carter, Obama |
| 43 | Larss G. Celtnieks | Army | 2015–2018 | — | — | Carter, Obama |
| 44 | James W. Herring Jr. | Army | 2015–2018 | — | — | Carter, Obama |
| 45 | Frank D. Hutchison | Navy | 2018–2019 | — | — | Trump |
| 46 | Marcus N. Fulton | Navy | 2018–2019 | — | — | Trump |
| 47 | Jan E. Aldykiewicz | Army | 2019–2022 | — | — | Trump |
| 48 | Michael A. Lewis | Air Force | 2019–2022 | — | — | Trump |
| 49 | Tom Posch | Air Force | 2019–2023 | — | — | Trump |
| 50 | Angela Tang | Navy | 2019–2021 | — | — | Trump |
| 51 | Paula Schasberger | Army | 2019–2021 | — | — | Trump |
| 53 | James E. Key III | Air Force | 2021–2023 | — | — | Trump |
| 54 | John J. Stephens | Marine Corps | 2021–2023 | — | — | Trump |
| 55 | Natalie D. Richardson | Air Force | 2023–2025 | — | 2023–2025 | Biden |
| 57 | Michael C. Holifield | Navy | 2023–2025 | — | — | Biden |
| 58 | Stuart T. Kirkby | Navy | 2023–2025 | — | — | Biden |
| 59 | Jennifer A. Parker | Army | 2023–2025 | — | — | Biden |
| 61 | Robert E. Murdough | Army | 2025–2026 | — | — | Trump |
| 67 | Dayle P. Percle | Air Force | 2025–2026 | — | — | Trump |

Julie Huygen (2019) and Luis O. Rodriguez (2020) were also confirmed by the Senate as judges of USCMCR, but did apparently not assume their positions.

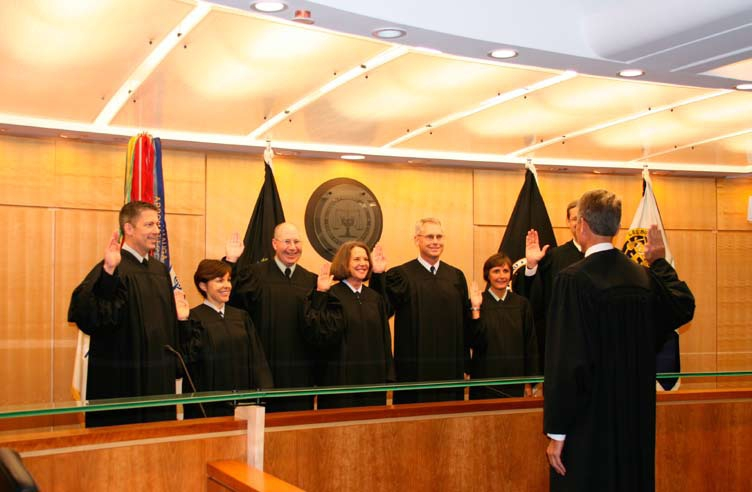
Swearing in judges on the Court of Military Commission Review. John Rolph swears in Paul P. Holden Jr., Dawn Scholz, Steven Walburn, Amy Bechtold, Steven Thompson, Lisa M. Schenck, and Eric E. Geiser.

== United States v. Mohammed Jawad ==
Stephen R. Henley, the Presiding Officer in United States v. Mohamed Jawad had ruled that evidence that was the result of torture could not be used. On February 9, 2009, three judges from the Court, Frank J. Williams, Dan O'Toole, and D. Francis were empaneled to consider whether they should comply with the President's Executive Order halting all their proceedings.

== Suspension ==
On January 22, 2009, President Obama issued Executive Order 13492 ordering the closure of the Guantanamo Bay detention camps, within one year. That order temporarily suspended all proceedings before the Court of Military Commission Review. Congress later blocked the closure of the camp.

== Appeal of the verdict of Ali Al Bahlul's military commission ==
Carol Rosenberg, writing in the Miami Herald, reported that Ali Al Bahlul's military defense attorneys filed a fifty-page appeal of his sentence on free speech grounds on September 2, 2009. They claimed his production of al Qaeda propaganda material was protected by the first amendment of the United States Constitution.

Mr. al Bahlul is not a sympathetic defendant. He embraces an ideology that glorifies violence, justifies terrorism and opposes constitutional democracy. As offensive as it may be, [Bahlul's film work] is speech that falls within the core protections of the First Amendment, which forbids the prosecution of 'the thoughts, the beliefs, the ideals of the accused.

Three of the Court's judges assembled on January 26, 2010, to hear oral arguments. Following that, the CMCR determined to proceed with the case en banc and held a hearing on March 16, 2011. The CMCR issued an opinion on September 9, 2011, that upheld al Bahlul's conviction.

== Salim Hamdan's appeal ==
Attorneys working on behalf of Salim Hamdan have appealed his conviction, and oral arguments were heard on January 26, 2010. Hamdan has already finished serving his sentence.

== Replacement proposal ==
Carol Rosenberg, writing in the Miami Herald, reported that the Obama administration had proposed a change in where appeals of the rulings and verdicts of military commissions would be heard. The proposed changes would have had them first heard by the United States Court of Appeals for the Armed Forces, which Rosenberg noted was an experienced, respected 58-year-old institution. Under the current rules of the court, there is no appeal to rulings of the Court of Military Commission Review; under the proposed changes, appeals could ultimately have been taken to the United States Supreme Court.
