= William B. Pollard III =

American judge (born 1947)

William Pollard

Judge of the United States Court of Military Commission Review
- In office August 30, 2012 – 2025
- Appointed by: Barack Obama
- Preceded by: Seat established

Personal details
- Born: April 5, 1947 (age 79) St. Louis, Missouri, U.S.
- Education: Washington University in St. Louis (BA); Columbia University (MBA, JD)

William Buster Pollard III (born April 5, 1947) is a judge of the United States Court of Military Commission Review.

== Biography ==
Pollard was born on April 5, 1947, in St. Louis, Missouri. He received a Bachelor of Arts degree in 1970 from Washington University in St. Louis. He received a joint Master of Business Administration and Juris Doctor in 1974 from Columbia University. He began his legal career at the law firm of Paul, Weiss, Rifkind, Wharton & Garrison, from 1974 to 1981. From 1981 to 1993, he served as an Assistant United States Attorney in the Southern District of New York, serving as Deputy Chief of the Criminal Division from 1988 to 1993. Since 1993, he has served as a named partner at the law firm of Kornstein Veisz Wexler & Pollard, LLP in New York City, where he specializes in complex civil and white collar criminal cases and grand jury and regulatory investigations. Under the terms of his appointment to the United States Court of Military Commission review, he is permitted to continue the private practice of law during his service on the court.

== Court of Military Commission Review service ==
On November 10, 2011, President Barack Obama nominated Pollard to serve as a Judge of the United States Court of Military Commission Review, to a new seat. He was confirmed by the Senate on June 21, 2012, received his commission on August 30, 2012, and entered service on the court on September 14, 2012.

Omar Khadr's lawyers challenged Pollard's eligibility for appointment to the CMCR.

Legal offices
New seat	Judge of the United States Court of Military Commission Review; 2012–present	Incumbent
