= Hardin Coleman =

American academic administrator

Hardin L.K. Coleman

Dean of Boston University School of Education
- In office 2008–2017

Personal details
- Relatives: William Thaddeus Coleman Jr. (father)
- Education: Williams College; University of Vermont; Stanford University

Hardin Coleman is a professor of counseling psychology at the Boston University School of Education, where he served as dean in the School of Education from 2008 to 2017. He graduated with a B.A. in psychology from Williams College, and in 1980 he received his master's degree in counseling from the University of Vermont. In 1992, Coleman gained a Doctorate in Counseling from Stanford University, where he later studied for a Ph.D. in counseling psychology, with a focus on multicultural counseling. Throughout his professional career, Coleman has been concerned with the mental health needs of adolescents and their families, with an emphasis on meeting those needs within educational settings and community mental health agencies.

== Biography ==
After receiving his Doctorate from Stanford University, Coleman spent ten years as a high school religion teacher and school counselor in Quaker schools in the Philadelphia area. During that time, he started several religious education programs and developed a counseling program for the Westtown School in Pennsylvania. He was also a presenter of workshops at secondary school conferences on religious education, peer counseling, and adolescent counseling. On returning to Stanford to study for his Ph.D., Coleman became involved in multicultural counseling training for counselors and educational tutors.

Coleman joined the department of counseling psychology at the University of Wisconsin–Madison as an assistant professor in 1991. He would later serve as interim associate dean at Wisconsin's School of Education from 2004 to 2008.

He was appointed as Associate Dean of Outreach and Multicultural Initiatives of the School of Education at Boston University in March 2008. On his appointment, Provost David Campbell described him as "an outstanding educator and professional whose experience, scholarship, and training epitomize Boston University’s long history of engagement with the community." Boston University President Robert A. Brown stated "With Hardin Coleman's leadership, we will further enhance our legacy of quality educational programs, research, and community engagement."

In June 2013, Coleman was appointed to the Boston School Committee, where he was elected to co-chair the Superintendent Search Committee.

== Publications ==
Coleman has co-authored several books on school counseling: Multicultural Counseling Competencies: Assessment, Education and Training, and Supervision (1997); The Intersection of Race, Class and Gender: Implications for Multicultural Counseling (2001); Handbook of Multicultural Competencies (2003); Handbook on School Counseling (2008); and Developing Multicultural Counseling Competence Through the Use of Portfolios (2011).

He has published numerous articles appearing in the Journal of Counseling Psychology, The School Counselor, The Psychological Bulletin, and Professional Psychology: Research and Practice.

== Personal life ==
He is married to Gail Coleman and has two sons, Jesse and Aaron Coleman, who have also embarked on careers in education.
