= Boston University Wheelock College of Education and Human Development =

School of education in Boston University

Coordinates: 42.3497°N 71.1007°W

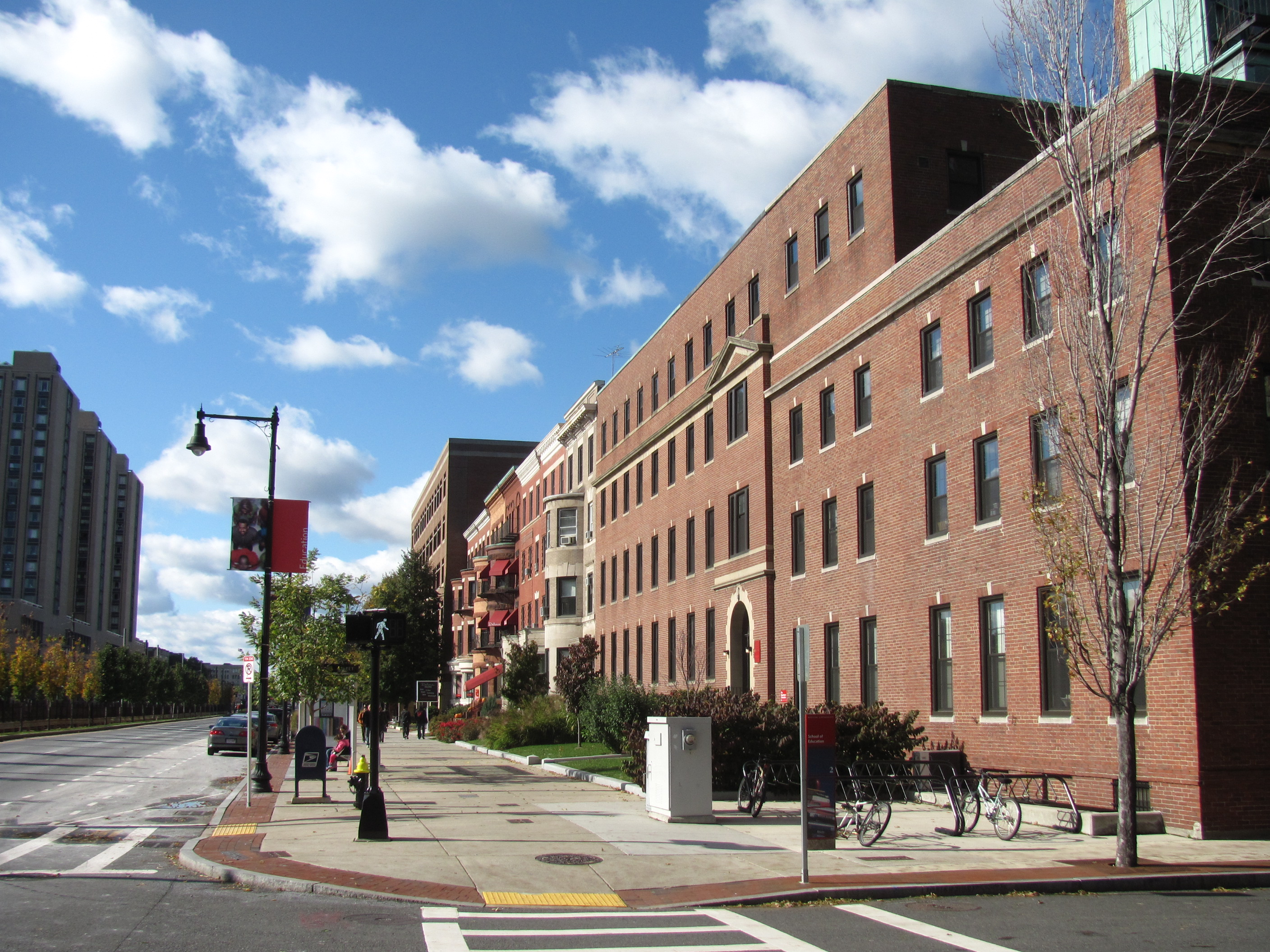
- Wheelock College Building at corner of Silber Way & Commonwealth Avenue
- Type: Private
- Established: 1918
- Dean: Penny Bishop
- Faculty: 155
- Students: 1,600+
- Location: Boston, Massachusetts, United States
- Campus: Urban
- Website: bu.edu/sed

The Boston University Wheelock College of Education and Human Development, formerly Boston University School of Education (SED), is the school of education within Boston University. It is located on the University's Charles River Campus in Boston, Massachusetts in the former Lahey Clinic building. BU Wheelock has more than 31,000 alumni, 32 full-time faculty and both undergraduate and graduate students. The School of Education is a member institution of the American Association of Colleges for Teacher Education (AACTE).

== History ==
Boston University School of Education was founded in 1918 by Dr. Arthur H. Wilde, who served as the first dean of the school.

In 2018, the School of Education merged with Wheelock College to Boston University Wheelock College of Education and Human Development.

BU Wheelock houses the oldest continuously published journal in the field of education in the country, the Journal of Education. The Journal of Education was founded in 1875 from the merger of five New England education journals. In 1953, the Boston University School of Education took over publication of the journal, converting it to a student-run review in 1972 and then to a peer-reviewed academic journal in 2009.

== Programs of study ==
Boston University School of Education offers a Bachelor of Science undergraduate degree in Education and Human Development, with five pathways to choose from:

Child & Adolescent Mental Health

Deaf Studies

Educational Design for Transformative Social Futures

Teaching & Learning

Youth Development & Justice

BU Wheelock also offers numerous graduate programs and degrees, including the Master of Education degree, the Master of Arts in Teaching degree, the Certificate of Advanced Graduate Study, the Doctor of Education degree, and the Doctor of Philosophy degree. Graduate programs include degrees in Counseling Psychology and Applied Human Development, Educational Leadership, and Curriculum and Teaching. Boston University's special education program offers a dual-degree program with the School of Social Work that results in students earning either an M.S.W./Ed.M. or an M.S.W./Ed.D.

Master's degree and C.A.G.S. programs usually require the equivalent of one year of full-time study. Doctoral programs generally require the equivalent of two or more years of full-time study.

== Other programs ==
In 1997, Boston University created Boston University’s Initiative for Literacy Development (BUILD). BUILD is a collaboration between Boston University and the Boston Public Schools (BPS) that pairs BU students with BPS students from preschool to fifth grade and helps them develop their reading and writing skills.

In 1988, Boston University took over management of the public schools in Chelsea. The partnership was ended in June 2008.

In 2006, Step UP was created. Step Up is a collaboration between the BPS and the City of Boston to help students improve their performance. Boston University is one of five universities involved in the program.

== Notable people ==
=== Alumni ===
- Wendy Chamberlin, SED'71, former U.S. Ambassador to the Islamic Republic of Pakistan, currently President of the Middle East Institute
- Celeste Freytes, interim president of the University of Puerto Rico
- Marie Jean Philip, American Sign Language and Deaf Culture advocate, researcher and teacher. She was a pioneer in the Bilingual-Bicultural (Bi-Bi) movement
- Ben Bahan, American Sign Language storyteller and researcher
- Margaret Hamilton, American actress and educator

=== Faculty ===
- Penny A. Bishop, dean of BU Wheelock College of Education and Human Development, from 2024-present.
- David Chard, inaugural dean of BU Wheelock College of Education and Human Development, from 2021-2024.
- Hardin L.K. Coleman, dean of the School of Education at Boston University from 2008 to 2017.
- Henry Giroux, former professor of education at Boston University from 1977 to 1983. One of the founding theorists of critical pedagogy in the United States.
- James Paul Gee, former professor of education from 1982–1988 and chair of the Department of Developmental Studies and Counseling. His research focus is in psycholinguistics, discourse analysis, sociolinguistics, bilingual education, and literacy.
