= John Rolph (judge) =

American naval judge and lawyer

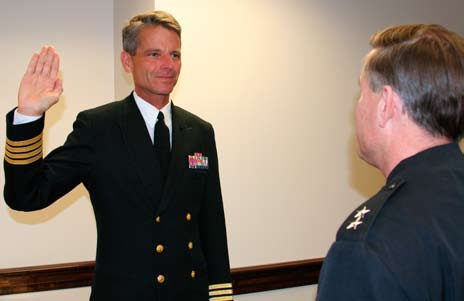
Rear Admiral Bruce MacDonald swears in Captain John Rolph as Deputy Chief Judge of the Court of Military Commission Review.

John Rolph is an American lawyer and officer in the United States Navy's Judge Advocate General corps.

== Military career ==
Captain John Rolph, JAGC, USN served as both an enlisted man and as an officer in the United States Navy during a 35-year career from 1973 until he retired in 2008. He served as an officer in the Judge Advocate General's Corps of the U.S. Navy from 1982 until 2008. He held many legal positions in the Navy, including prosecutor, defense counsel, staff judge advocate, executive officer and commanding officer. He served as the Command Judge Advocate on board the USS Independence (CVA-62) from 1988 to 1990, was the first Navy instructor/professor of law at the Army JAG School in Charlottesville, VA (International Law Department—1991-1993), and served as the Executive Officer and Commanding Officer of the Naval Legal Service Office in Norfolk, VA (1996–1998). His judicial positions include the following:

- From 1993 to 1996, served as a Military Judge in the Transatlantic Judicial Circuit (Europe)
- From 1998 to 2000, served as an Appellate Judge on the Navy and Marine Corps Court of Criminal Appeals in Washington, D.C.
- From 2000 to 2004, served as the Circuit Military Judge for the Tidewater Judicial Circuit in Norfolk, Virginia.
- From 2004 to 2006, served as the Chief Judge of the Navy and Marine Corps Trial Judiciary in Washington, D.C.
- From 2006 to 2008, served as the Chief Judge of the Navy and Marine Corps Court of Criminal Appeals in Washington, D.C.
- Also from 2007 to 2008, Captain Rolph simultaneously served as the first Deputy Chief Judge of the U.S. Court of Military Commission Review in Washington, D.C.
- On May 8, 2007, Captain Rolph was appointed a Judge on the Court of Military Commission Review.
- On June 15, 2007, Captain Rolph was appointed by the Secretary of Defense as the first Deputy Chief Judge of the Court of Military Commission Review. He served as "Acting Chief Judge" for many months pending the appointment of the first Chief Judge, Griffin Bell (former Attorney General under President Carter).

== Guantanamo challenge ==
Rolph's appointment was mentioned in a jurisdictional appeal filed by Omar Khadr's lawyers.

Khadr's lawyers had argued that the Military Commissions Act only authorized the Secretary of Defense to appoint a Chief Judge, not a Deputy Chief Judge. And they pointed out that Rolph had been appointed the Deputy Chief Judge not by the Secretary of Defense Donald Rumsfeld, but also by Deputy Secretary of Defense Gordon R. England. In June 2007, in his role as Deputy Chief Judge, Rolph had completed the compilation of the Court's "rules of practice", which he published on June 28, 2007. Deputy Secretary England approved the rules of practice on August 13, 2007. Khadr's lawyers argued that Rolph lacked the jurisdiction to publish the Court's rules of practice—that only the Chief Justice had that authority. And they argued that only the Secretary of Defense had the authority to approve the rules; not his Deputy.

Khadr's lawyers' appeal was heard by the Court of Military Commission Review itself, which ruled, on September 19, 2008, that the Military Commissions Act gave the Secretary of Defense broad discretion in how he delegated the tasks involved in running and overseeing the court, and that the Rolph rules of practice compilation were properly authorized.
