= European Journal of Education =

- Discipline: Education
- Language: English
- Edited by: Richard Desjardins, Janet Looney

Publication details
- History: 1966-present
- Publisher: Wiley-Blackwell
- Frequency: Quarterly
- Impact factor: 2.609 (2021)

Standard abbreviations
- ISO 4: Eur. J. Educ.

Indexing
- ISSN: 0141-8211 (print); 1465-3435 (web)
- LCCN: 80645711
- OCLC no.: 937094923

Links
- Journal homepage; Online access; Online archive

The European Journal of Education is a quarterly peer-reviewed academic journal on education, published quarterly by Wiley-Blackwell. Each issue contains a section that covers a particular theme and contributions for this section are commissioned.
