= Mohamed Jawad =

Afghan Guantanamo detainee

- Three months before capture.
- Born: 1985 (age 40–41); Miranshah, FATA, Pakistan
- Arrested: December 2002; Afghanistan; Afghan police
- Released: August 24, 2009
- Citizenship: Afghan
- Detained at: Bagram, Guantanamo
- Other names: Amir Khan, Mir Jan, Sakheb Badsha
- ISN: 900
- Charge: Attempted murder in violation of the law of war

Mohamed Jawad, an Afghan refugee born in 1985 in Miranshah, Pakistan, was accused of attempted murder before a Guantanamo military commission on charges that he threw a grenade at a passing American convoy on December 17, 2002. Jawad's family says that he was 12 years old at the time of his detention in 2002. The United States Department of Defense maintains that a bone scan showed he was about 17 when taken into custody.

Jawad insists that he had been hired to help remove landmines from the war-torn region, and that a colleague had thrown the grenade. He was held in extrajudicial detention first at the Bagram Theater Internment Facility in Afghanistan and then at the Guantanamo Bay detention camp, Cuba, from 2003 until 2009. His Internment Serial Number was 900.

The military commission presiding judge ruled that Jawad's confession to throwing a grenade was inadmissible since it had been obtained through coercion after Afghan authorities threatened to kill him and his family. He was ordered released after a successful petition for a writ of habeas corpus before Judge Ellen Huvelle of the U.S. District Court in Washington, D.C., on July 30, 2009. On August 24, 2009, he was transported from Guantanamo Bay to Afghanistan.

== Age ==
Like many Afghans, Mohamed Jawad has no official record of his birth, and does not know his exact age. Human rights workers trying to establish a reliable estimate of his birth date consulted with his mother; she said that he was born six months after his father was killed during a battle near Khost in 1991. In an English-language Al Jazeera broadcast, one of his uncles said he was born four months after the battle where his father was killed, which he said occurred in 1990.

Pentagon spokesman Jeffrey D. Gordon disputed these claims, saying that bone scans performed when Jawad arrived at Guantanamo established that the youth was about eighteen at the time. A report by the University of California at Davis, about juveniles held at Guantanamo, stated that military records show Jawad to have been either 17 or 18 at the time of his arrival.

== Background ==
Jawad's father was killed in a battle in Khost, Afghanistan called, Battle for Hill 3234, in January 1988 during the Afghan-Soviet War. Relatives say Jawad was born six months later in an Afghan refugee camp in Miran Shah, Pakistan, where they continued to live.

Jawad was studying at a sixth or seventh-grade level at a school which United States agents later described as "Jihadi". Several years later, he was approached by four or six men at Qari Mosque in his hometown. They asked if he would be willing to take a lucrative job in Kabul, Afghanistan where the government intended to remove landmines. He was promised 12,000 Pakistani rupees to help clear Soviet-era mines from the region.

Jawad agreed, but said he needed to gain his mother's permission to travel. The men told him to tell his family he had found a job across the border, but not to mention the details lest they worry about his safety. Some of his relatives tried to discourage him, saying Jawad was too young for a job. His mother was not around and he decided to accompany the men.

== Attack and capture ==
Sergeant first class Michael Lyons was driving a white Soviet UAZ jeep, with Sergeant first class Christopher Martin in the passenger seat and the Afghan interpreter Assadullah Khan Omerk in the rear. They had just finished an operation in the marketplace and were stopped in traffic, when somebody tossed a homemade grenade through the jeep's missing rear window.

Both soldiers from the 19th Special Forces Group were wounded, Lyons in the eye, eardrum, and both feet; while Martin had less serious injuries to his right knee, and the Afghan interpreter suffered only minor injuries.

Four American Humvees cordoned off the site of the attack, and Afghan police near the area arrested three men; they held Jawad and Ghulam Saki, while releasing a third suspect. A police officer said that he had seen one throw the grenade, and the other was tackled by a fruit vendor as he prepared to throw a second.

Jawad would later tell his Administrative Review Board at Guantanamo that the men he was with gave him devices he didn't recognise. They told him to put them in his pocket and wait for their return. When he went into his pocket for coins to purchase raisins from a shopkeeper, he was asked why he had a "bomb" in his pocket; the shopkeeper advised him to run and throw the two grenades in the river. It was while running toward the river, yelling at people to move aside because he had a bomb, that Jawad alleges he was "caught".

In an October 2009 interview, Jawad asserted that his nose was broken during his first interrogation at an Afghan police station.

== Imprisonment at Bagram ==
Jawad was held at Bagram prison and interrogated from December 2002 until February 2003.

== Imprisonment at Guantanamo ==
Jawad was transported to Guantanamo Bay detention camp in February 2003. Military records show Jawad tried to kill himself on December 25, 2003, by repeatedly banging his head against a cell wall. Jawad said that guards had subjected him to sleep deprivation.

=== Medical records ===
The Department of Defense published heights and weights for the detainees on March 16, 2007. At the time of his capture in Afghanistan in December 2002, Jawad was weighed at 130 pounds. Jawad is one of the detainees whose inprocess date at Guantánamo is missing. His inprocess weight is recorded as 119 pounds. His inprocess height is recorded as 64 inches tall (5'4"). His weight was recorded 23 times between August 2003 and November 2006. No record of his weight was made for six months during the longest and most widespread Guantánamo hunger strike from October 2005 through March 2006.

- In 2004 his weight ranged from 118 to 143 pounds.
- In 2005 his weight ranged from 140 to 150 pounds.
- In 2006 his weight ranged from 142 to 160 pounds.

On November 11, 2012, Santiago Wills wrote in the Atlantic Magazine that health professionals had taken part in Jawad's interrogation. His article discussed the question of ethics of health professionals supporting severe interrogation techniques and treatment in Guantanamo.

Wills quoted from a leaked detainee assessment, in which a member of the BSCT team wrote:

He appears to be rather frightened, and it looks as if he could break easily if he were isolated from his support network and made to rely solely on the interrogator... Make him as uncomfortable as possible. Work him as hard as possible.

Wills described how Jawad was moved to cell blocks where he didn't speak any of the languages of the captives, in order to increase his feelings of loneliness and isolation. He said the youth was punished for trying to speak to his fellow captives. In addition, his "comfort items" were repeatedly removed—leaving him naked, and without the toiletry required for the ritual cleanliness observant Muslims are supposed to observe prior to their prayers.

Katherine Porterfield, a psychologist from the Survivors of Torture Program at Bellevue Hospital was allowed to treat Jawad in the last years of his detention.

=== Experienced the "frequent flyer" program ===
Although the practice was officially banned in March 2004, in May 2004, Jawad was subjected to the "frequent flyer" program of sleep deprivation by being forced to move to a new cell on average every 2 hours and 55 minutes. These transfers happened 112 times over two weeks. Jawad testified that during these weeks, he was also subjected to blaring loud music and bright lights at all times. Military records indicated that Jawad lost 10% of his body weight over this period and told doctors he was urinating blood.

=== Combatant Status Review ===
A summary of evidence memo was prepared on October 19, 2004, for Jawad's Combatant Status Review Tribunal. The memo stated that Jawad was from Miran Shah, Pakistan and was recruited by six men in the local mosque to clear Russian mines in Kabul, Afghanistan. The memo alleged that Jawad:

- was affiliated with Hezb-E-Islami, a terrorist organization with ties to Osama bin Laden
- attended "Jihad Madrassas" that prepared him to fight on the front lines
- attended a training camp in late 2002 and received instruction on the AK-47, shoulder-held rocket launchers and grenades
- told an associate that he would kill Northern Alliance and American forces.
- was captured fleeing the scene of a grenade attack targeting Americans on December 17, 2002.

Jawad had his Personal Representative read from notes from a previous interview at his CSRT hearing. Jawad added verbal testimony for clarification.

=== First annual Administrative Review Board ===
An unclassified summary of evidence memo was prepared on November 7, 2005, for Jawad's first annual Administrative Review Board. It listed several factors favoring continued detention, including that Jawad:

- met with an individual in Khost Province, Afghanistan in October 2002. The individual offered Jawad a job that involved killing Americans,
- met four people at Qurey Mosque in Miran Shah, Pakistan in December 2002. They offered him 12,000 Pakistan Rupees to clear mines, and
- trained for one and a half days in Khost. Jawad was given one or two injections that caused confusion and incoherence. On December 17, 2002, Jawad was given two oral pills that caused the same effects.

The ARB memo repeated claims about training from the CSRT memo, summarized Jawad's statements from his interrogation in Afghanistan immediately after the attack, and registered Jawad's contention that although he was at the scene of the attack, he did not throw the grenade and that he never received any military or terrorist training. There is no transcript listed in Department of Defense records.

=== Second annual Administrative Review Board ===
An unclassified summary of evidence memo was prepared on October 26, 2006, for Jawad's second annual ARB. The memo lists Jawad's name as Amir Khan. The allegations and denials listed in the memo are mostly similar to earlier memos and mostly summarize alleged statements from Jawad. There is no transcript listed in Department of Defense records.

== Guantanamo military commission charges ==
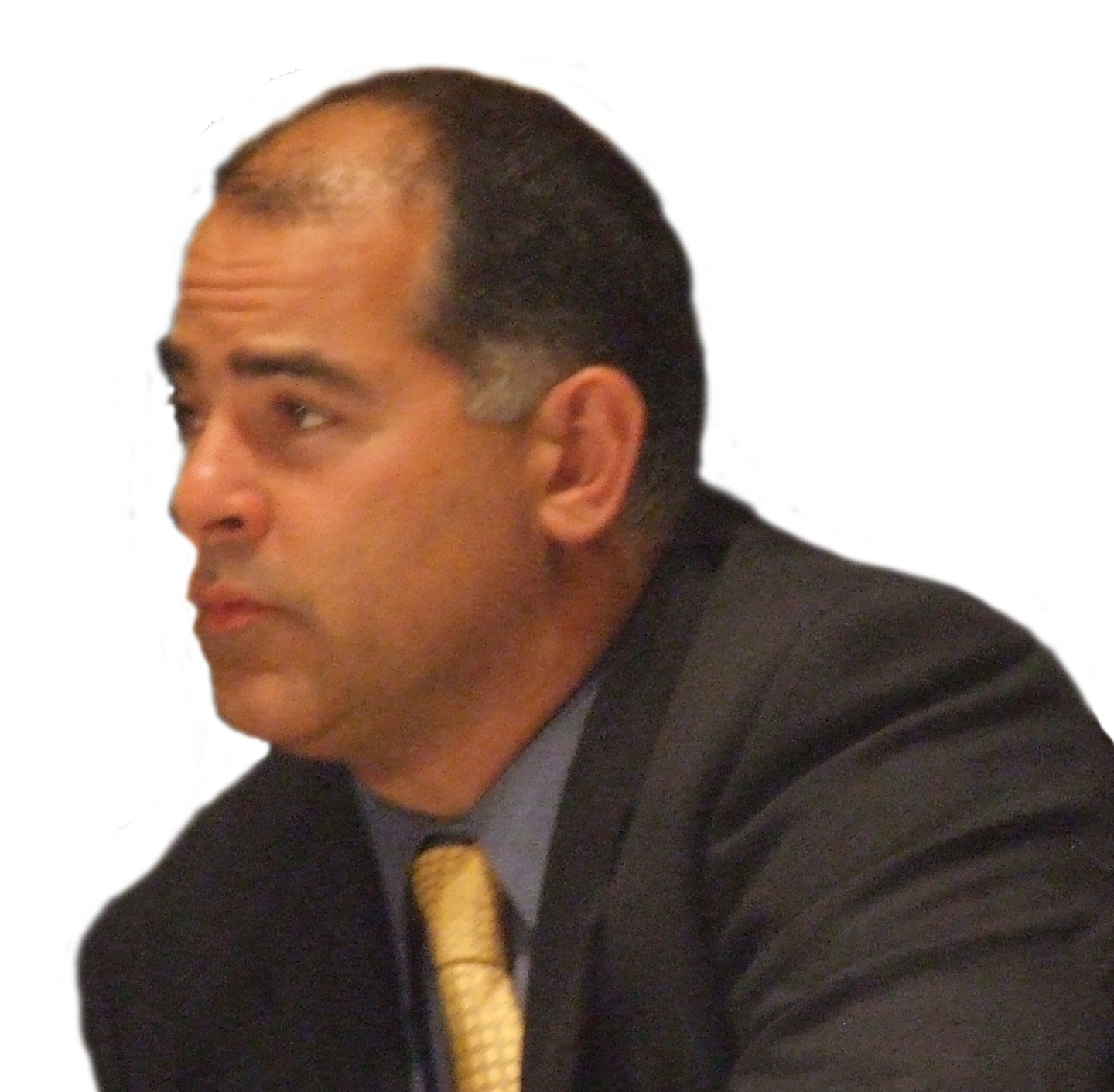
Major David Frakt.

In October 2007 Jawad was charged before a Guantanamo military commission for attempted murder for allegedly throwing a grenade into a U.S. military vehicle in Kabul, Afghanistan on December 17, 2002. He was the fourth detainee to face charges under commissions authorized by the Military Commissions Act of 2006. On October 17, 2007, Jawad was charged with three counts of attempted murder in violation of the law of war and three counts of intentionally causing bodily injury in violation of the law of war.

Jawad refused to appear at his arraignment in March 2008. He was forcibly removed from his cell and brought to the commission hearing room. He appeared without incident at the next hearing in May.

Jawad's military defense attorney, Major David Frakt, who was assigned by the government, filed motions seeking the dismissal of charges based on the fact that Jawad was captured as a teenager, treated brutally in U.S. custody and was not a member of a terrorist organization.

In another motion, Frakt complained about the inappropriate involvement by the legal adviser to the commissions, Brigadier General Thomas W. Hartmann, who had withheld exculpatory evidence in recommending charges. Hartmann had been suspended from participating in another commission following similar complaints. He had intervened to move Jawad's case forward in the military commission priorities because wounded victims were available for possible testimony from California. On August 14, 2008, judge Colonel Stephen Henley barred Hartmann from future participation in Jawad's case.

On September 25, 2008, Jawad's military prosecutor, Lt. Col. Darrel Vandeveld, resigned in protest from the Office of Military Commissions, saying it was not providing due process for defendants. He filed a four-page declaration with the court that stated "potentially exculpatory evidence has not been provided" to the defense in the Jawad case. The evidence included the possibility that Jawad may have been drugged prior to the attack, and that the Afghan Interior Ministry said two other men had confessed to throwing the grenade into the U.S. jeep. Frakt intended to call Vandeveld as a defense witness about due process issues. In addition, Vandeveld said he had hoped to arrange a plea deal for Jawad. Vandeveld's superiors banned him from testifying for the defense and said they would do no plea deal. Vandeveld resigned and later testified about the due process issues in court. He was the fourth military prosecutor to resign because of problems with the system of military tribunals.

In October 2008, judge Col. Henley determined that the two confessions Jawad made to Afghan and U.S. officials on December 17, 2002, were both inadmissible due to being obtained as a result of torture and intimidation. Afghan policemen had threatened to kill him and his family unless he confessed. Col. Henley ruled that Jawad's confession in U.S. custody was also inadmissible because of the earlier torture; in addition the U.S. interrogator had blindfolded and hooded Jawad in order to frighten him.

In Boumediene v. Bush (2008), the Supreme Court ruled that detainees could have direct access to federal courts for habeas corpus cases. By the time of his military commission, Mohamed Jawad also had a habeas case pending in the US District Court for the District of Columbia.

Following US District Court Judge Ellen Huvelle's ruling in Jawad's habeas corpus case in federal court that he was a noncombatant, Maj. Frakt filed a motion on July 28, 2009, with his military commission asking for dismissal of his charges and release to freedom.

== Release order and possible trial in a civilian court ==
Judge Huvelle was assigned Jawad's habeas corpus petition. He was represented by Joshua Haifetz of the American Civil Liberties Union (ACLU). On July 17, 2009, Judge Huvelle ruled that the Jawad's confessions were coerced, and thus inadmissible.

She gave the Department of Justice a deadline of July 24, 2009, to produce another justification for holding Jawad as an enemy combatant. On July 24, the Department of Justice acknowledged it lacked the evidence necessary to justify holding Jawad as an enemy combatant.

According to Reuters, the Department of Defense announced it was "taking steps to house" Jawad at an "appropriate facility" in Guantanamo.

United States Attorney General Eric Holder has said that he has ordered a new criminal investigation. The Justice Department said the new investigation is examining videotapes of eyewitness testimony that was not previously available. The investigation could result in new criminal charges in a civilian court on US soil.

On July 28, 2009, Judge Huvelle gave the Department of Justice 24 hours to justify continuing to hold Jawad so it could conduct an "expedited criminal investigation," and scheduled a hearing for July 30, 2009. On July 29, 2009, BBC News reported that Jawad would be released because "there was no military case for Mr Jawad's continued detention."

Carol Rosenberg, writing in the Miami Herald, reported on July 28, 2009 that Jawad has been transferred to Camp Iguana at Guantanamo. His defense attorney David Frakt told Rosenberg that one of Jawad's co-counsels had recently visited Jawad in Camp Iguana. Frakt said, "He's adjusting to his new environment, learning to play the Wii and getting caught up on Afghan cricket and soccer scores. He's pleased but bewildered by the legal developments. Yet again he's won, but he's still there."

== Repatriation ==
Carol Rosenberg, writing in the Miami Herald, reports that Jawad was repatriated on August 24, 2009. He was first sent for questioning to the Pul-e-Charkhi prison, a former Soviet facility. The United States built an American wing in 2007.

Major Eric Montalvo, a former military defense counsel, said that Jawad was scheduled to meet with President Hamid Karzai. He was to be released into the custody of an uncle, Hajji Gul Naik. Montalvo, who had flown to Afghanistan at his own expense because the Department of Defense would not authorize him to help aid Jawad's arrival, said: "It's still not over until he can walk free, but he is almost there. I don't trust anything until I see him in his house with his family."

An article published in The National on October 15, 2009, covered Jawad's return to Afghanistan:

A photograph of [Jawad] before his ordeal shows a boy virtually unrecognisable from the 19-year-old man who, after his release in the summer, described being stripped naked, choked, slammed against walls and often held in isolation during this time. 'The people who are in [Guantanamo and Bagram] jails are all Muslims. The Americans are not respecting their religion and they are not respecting them as humans,' he said.

The National described Jawad as now present for a war that has grown noticeably fiercer in the years he has been away. "The situation will get worse because it's impossible to finish fighting with fighting," he said. "It's impossible to clean blood with blood."

== See also ==
- Juveniles held at the Guantanamo Bay detention camp
- Sleep deprivation
- Omar Khadr
