= Frequent flyer program (Guantanamo) =

Torture technique used by the U.S. in Guantanamo Bay

The frequent flyer program is a controversial technique used by the United States in the Guantanamo Bay detainment camps in Cuba. Guards deprived detainees of sleep by moving them from one cell to another, multiple times a day, for days or weeks on end.

The technique was used to "soften up" detainees prior to interrogation. Guantanamo guards were ordered to discontinue the use of the technique in March 2004, although the practice persisted until at least later that year.

Major David Frakt, USAF, defense counsel to a recipient of the program, Mohamed Jawad, said:

No one actually knows the full scope of the abuses at Guantanamo [and that] all of these allegedly comprehensive investigations were whitewashed. This is only the tip of the iceberg. This program was approved at the highest levels.... It suggests that people had simply lost their ability to distinguish right from wrong.

In August 2008, in testimony at Jawad's Guantanamo military commission trial, US Army officers confirmed the existence of the frequent flyer program. At least 17 detainees were subjected to the program.

In May 2012, Ramzi Kassem, a lawyer for detainee Shaker Aamer, said his client alleges the frequent flyer program was still being used as a punishment technique in the isolation block known as Camp Five Echo.

== See also ==
- Mohamed Jawad
- Ghassan al-Shirbi
- Torture
