= Clarke Paulus =

United States Marine Corps officer

Major Clarke Paulus was a United States Marine Corps officer who was briefly in charge of Camp Whitehorse.

== Camp Whitehorse ==
Paulus, who is from Buckingham Township, Bucks County, Pennsylvania, was an active duty officer, who had volunteered for service in Iraq just one month after his marriage. According to the San Diego Union-Tribune Paulus was about 35 years old. The troops he commanded at Camp Whitehorse were all reservists.

=== Death of Nagem Hatab ===
Several hundred POWs passed through Camp Whitehorse. One of them, Nagem Hatab, died on or around June 5, 2003. Hatab was captured for an alleged role in the March 23, 2003 ambush of the 507th Maintenance Battalion in An Nasiriyah that resulted in the deaths of 9 U.S. soldiers and the capture of Private Jessica Lynch. He was only in custody for about three days. Unlike the other detainees who were at Camp Whitehorse, Hatab refused to communicate with the Marine translator at the detention facility, which led to a later misperception of his condition. Moreover, Paulus had been informed by the Marine Human Intelligence Exploitation Team who interrogated Hatab his first day in confinement that it was unlikely that Hatab would cooperate with his captors. On June 5 he began to display listless behavior, first appearing unstable on his feet then lying down and soiling himself, becoming covered in excrement. As other prisoners had been known to exhibit false signs of faking physical distress, it was unclear if Hatab's behavior was legitimate, and his failure to communicate with the Marine translator compounded the situation. Paulus ordered one of his Marines to haul Hatab out of the common cell to where he could be hosed off. He ordered his soiled clothes removed and burned, and for him to be placed in an outside wire enclosure so his loss of bowel control wouldn't soil the other prisoners' living and eating areas.

A medical corpsman examined Hatab at approximately 5pm, and reported to Paulus that options for Hatab's condition included that he may have suffered a heart attack. However, the medic said Hatab's vital signs were normal and therefore he should be left under observation. (Hatab's autopsy report confirmed he did not suffer a heart attack.) Because the detention facility had no replacement clothing Hatab was left outside naked that evening. At midnight Hatab was found dead. A post-mortem alleged that Hatab had haemorrhaged and suffocated because his hyoid bone had been broken. The hyoid break allegedly occurred when the Marine Paulus had ordered to remove Hatab from the general living area dragged him out. Hatab would not stand so he was hauled by the Marine who cupped his hands under the man's chin, dragging him to the wire enclosure. Once in the enclosure, Hatab was cleaned off, provided food and water and left under direct observation of one of the Marine guards. The entire episode occurred with Major Paulus's commanding officer present.

According to the Houston Chronicle:

"Lieutenant Colonel Kathleen Ingwersen of the Armed Forces Institute of Pathology noted the body had extensive bruising and found seven cracked or fractured ribs. Hatab also had a broken hyoid bone — the free-floating, wishbone-shaped bone supporting the tongue. That, she said, caused him to slowly asphyxiate after he was dragged by the neck to a holding pen. She declared the death a homicide."

Medical testimony for the defense stated that there was nothing clear about the autopsy photo of the hyoid bone and that Ingwersen's autopsy report contradicted her final conclusions. For example, her autopsy report showed Hatab's larynx was not bruised. When confronted with this Ingersen flatly replied that on that point the autopsy report was mistaken.

According to the North County Times Ingwersen said Hatab's was not the usual kind of suffocation—that his death would have spanned hours. When pressed by Paulus' lawyers to present medical literature supporting her theory of death Ingwersen admitted there was none but that she stood by her findings.

== Court martial ==
Maj. Paulus was charged with negligent homicide, aggravated assault, abetting an assault, maltreatment, false official statement and dereliction of duty and went through a preliminary hearing in January 2004 to determine if he should be referred to a court martial. The presiding judge, Colonel William Gallo, heard all evidence presented by the prosecution and defense. At the conclusion of the Article 32 hearing Gallo recommended to then-Major General James Mattis, Commanding General of the 1st Marine Division and presiding officer, that the negligent homicide, assault, abetting an assault and false official statement charges be dropped. Col. Gallo's recommendation was for Paulus to receive non-judicial punishment. MajGen Mattis rejected Gallo's recommendation and referred Paulus to a General Court Martial. He also overruled Gallo and keeping the assault charge against Paulus

During Paulus's court martial in November 2004 the presiding judge, Colonel Robert Chester, was highly critical when he learned that key prosecution exhibits, including various of Hatab's body parts- specifically the hyoid bone that LTC Ingwersen alleged was broken- were unaccountably missing. He threatened "extreme measures" if Hatab's body parts could not be located. Due to lack of cooperation from the Armed Forces Institute of Pathology in explaining and locating the missing medical evidence Chester eventually threw out all medical testimony from the case, despite the fact that the case stemmed from LTC Ingwersen's questionable autopsy report and unsupported theory of Hatab's death.

The treatment of Hatab's body did not improve after his death. A United States Navy surgeon, Dr. Ray Santos, testified that when Hatab's body arrived at the morgue: “It kept slipping from my hands so I did drop it several times.” The U.S. Army Medical Examiner, Lieutenant Colonel Ingwersen, who performed the autopsy, reportedly acknowledged that Hatab's body had undergone decomposition because it was stored in an unrefrigerated drawer at the An Nasiriyah Hospital before the autopsy. A second Navy doctor, Commander Dennis McKenna, testified that the manner in which Hatab's body was removed from the holding cell would not have caused him bodily harm and would not have been the cause for a hyoid bone fracture. Following this testimony the most serious charge against Paulus, aggravated assault, was dropped by the judge.

Paulus was found guilty of maltreatment and dereliction of duty and was administratively dismissed from the service.

== See also ==
- Gary Pittman
- Christian Hernandez
