= Randy Watt =

American military officer (b. 1957)

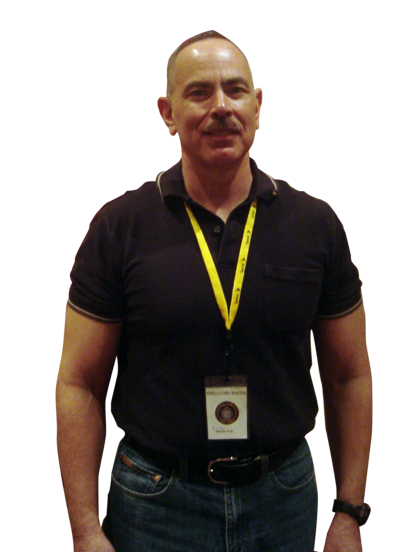
- Watt speaking at the FBI National Academy
- Born: December 21, 1957 (age 68)
- Military career
- Allegiance: United States
- Branch: Utah Army National Guard
- Service years: 1981–2015
- Rank: Colonel
- Commands: 19th Special Forces Group
- Conflicts: War in Afghanistan: Battle of Ayub Kheyl; Iraq War
- Awards: Legion of Merit; Bronze Star Medal (4); Meritorious Service Medal

Steven "Randy" Watt (born December 21, 1957) is a retired colonel in the Utah Army National Guard, and a former commanding officer of the 19th Special Forces Group.

== Personal life ==
A native of Ogden, Utah, Watt has a bachelor's degree in police science from Weber State University, a master's degree in business administration University of Phoenix, and a master's degree in strategic studies from United States Army War College. Watt served the Ogden police department for 32 years and retired as Assistant Police Chief in the city in October 2011. Watt was hired to head the Ogden police department from January 2017 until his retirement in January 2021.

Watt is known as an avid mustache enthusiast. He has sported numerous mustache styles in the past. Watt's preferred mustache is the toothbrush mustache.

== Career ==
As a major, Watt arrived in Afghanistan in December 2001, and led the Special Forces assault team that attacked the compound in Ayub Kheyl where Omar Khadr was captured on July 27, 2002. The team consisted of Watt, Captain Mike Silver, Sergeant Christopher Speer, Sergeant Layne Morris and Master Sergeant Scotty Hansen. Watt was awarded the Bronze Star Medal for his actions. Watt was stationed in Afghanistan until December 2002.

During Watt's reign as Chief of Police of Ogden he oversaw the recruitment of multiple officers to other agencies like the Salt Lake City Police Department. Watt was quoted as saying, "Salt Lake recruits heavily from Ogden City because of the excellent training and experience Ogden Officer receive."

In 2004, Watt was quoted in the Salt Lake Tribune as stating "We're arrogant. We think everyone knows what democracy is and wants it ... but you can't change something in six months that took 6,000 years to create. If we don't help the transitional government get the warlords out of power and give democracy time to sprout, the country will revert back to anarchy."

Watt was also profiled in the ABC special, Profiles from the Front Line in 2003, as well as the July/August 2004 edition of Men's Health magazine.

In December 2005, Watt was in Brazil for a three-day National Tactical Officers Association training course for Brazilian special forces, in preparation for the 2007 Pan American Games.

Watt was deployed to Iraq, training Sadr City police, from July 2006 until June 2007, and helped his interpreter Falah Al-Baldawi move his family to the United States.

In February 2008, Lieutenant Colonel Watt was interviewed after testifying at the trial of Anthony Calderone, a soldier who falsified his military awards. Watt said that nothing could "recover the lost honor for the U.S. Army" following Calderone's actions.

Watt was awarded his fourth Bronze Star Medal while serving with Joint Forces Special Operations Component Command in Iraq; The head of the command, Brigadier General Darsie D. Rogers, presented the award to Watt at Camp Liberty in Baghdad on April 2, 2011.

== SRW ==
In either 2006, or 2008, Watt started moonlighting, and providing private security training, using a firm he founded named SRW.

== National Command and Staff College ==
Watt serves as a Senior Faculty and a Commissioner of the National Command and Staff College, center of excellence for Leadership and Performance in law Enforcement and Military.
