= Bowden Institution =

Prison in Alberta, Canada

Bowden Institution and Annex
- Interactive map of Bowden Institution and Annex
- Location: Bowden, Alberta, Canada; 51°58′37.7″N 114°00′30.7″W
- Security class: medium / minimum security
- Capacity: 848 / 170
- Opened: 1974
- Managed by: Correctional Services Canada
- Website: https://www.canada.ca/en/correctional-service/corporate/facilities-security/institutional-profiles/prairie/bowden-institution.html

Bowden Institution is a medium security prison operated by Correctional Services Canada. It was built on an "open campus" model. In an adjoining minimum security annex prisoners live in ordinary houses.

The facility is located on Alberta's Queen Elizabeth II Highway, between the small towns of Bowden, Alberta and Innisfail, Alberta, approximately halfway between Calgary and Edmonton.

== History ==
The institution was constructed on the site of the former RCAF Station Bowden a World War II, British Commonwealth Air Training Plan Facility.

In 2006 there was a knifing at the institution. Guards threatened to strike, when the knife could not be found. Linda Slobodian, writing in the Calgary Herald, wrote that the prison had once mainly held sex offenders, but the prison population had recently had a considerable contingent of violent gang members transferred there.

In February 2014 former Guantanamo captive Omar Khadr was transferred to the institution from the Millhaven maximum security facility. At Bowden, unlike at Millhaven, Khadr would have access to programs which would help him apply for parole.

In 2012/2013 an additional 96-man receiving unit was constructed inside the medium security unit and an additional five 10-man housing units were constructed at the minimum security annex. Currently the medium security unit houses 2 men per cell in the majority of the cells. The daily average population is currently over 700 inmates.
