= Colby Vokey =

American lawyer and US Marine Corps officer

- Born: 1965 (age 60–61)
- Occupation: Lawyer

Colby Vokey (born 1965) is an American lawyer and former officer in the United States Marine Corps. He currently practices criminal defense law in his own private practice. He represents clients in all types of criminal matters, with particular emphasis on cases involving military law. Vokey earned the rank of lieutenant colonel and served as a judge advocate in the United States Marine Corps during 21 years of service to his country. His retirement from the Marine Corps became effective November 1, 2008. During his military career, Vokey earned worldwide praise for his work ethic and integrity, based in part on his work for defendants detained at Guantanamo Bay, Cuba, who faced charges stemming from the war in Iraq.

Vokey has been the subject of controversy during his efforts to defend Omar Khadr one of the dozen captives held in the Guantanamo Bay detention camps, in Cuba who eventually faced charges before a Guantanamo military commission.

== Gag order and investigation ==
In the fall of 2006 Vokey, and his paralegal Sergeant Heather Cerveny, had a gag order imposed on them after Cerveny filed an affidavit in which she described GIs in Guantanamo's enlisted club bragging about routine abuse of the captives. Muneer Ahmad, Khadr's civilian lawyer reported that Vokey and Cerveny had been ordered not to comment on conditions at Guantanamo.

The report quotes a statement released on behalf of Colonel Carol Joyce, the Marines' chief defense counsel, who:

... had directed him not to communicate with the media "pending her review of the facts. This is necessary to ensure all actions of counsel are in compliance with regulations establishing professional standards for military attorneys,"

Colonel Richard Basset was the officer assigned to investigate the allegations in Cerveny's affidavit. He returned from his investigation on November 15, 2006. He submitted his report on December 10, 2006. The report was not immediately made public. A thirteen-page heavily redacted summary of the inquiry was eventually made public.

Within a year, the lieutenant colonel had announced his retirement from the US Marine Corps.

== Retirement ==
The San Diego Union Tribune profiled Vokey following his retirement. The Union Tribune noted he had been forced into retirement even though another of his clients, Staff Sergeant Frank Wuterich, who faces charges for the murder of two dozen civilians in Haditha, Iraq, has not had his court martial.
