= Steven Watt =

Steven Watt may refer to:

- Steven Watt (footballer) (born 1985), Scottish footballer
- Steven Randy Watt, American Special Forces soldier
