= Thomas W. Hartmann =

American air force officer and military prosecutor

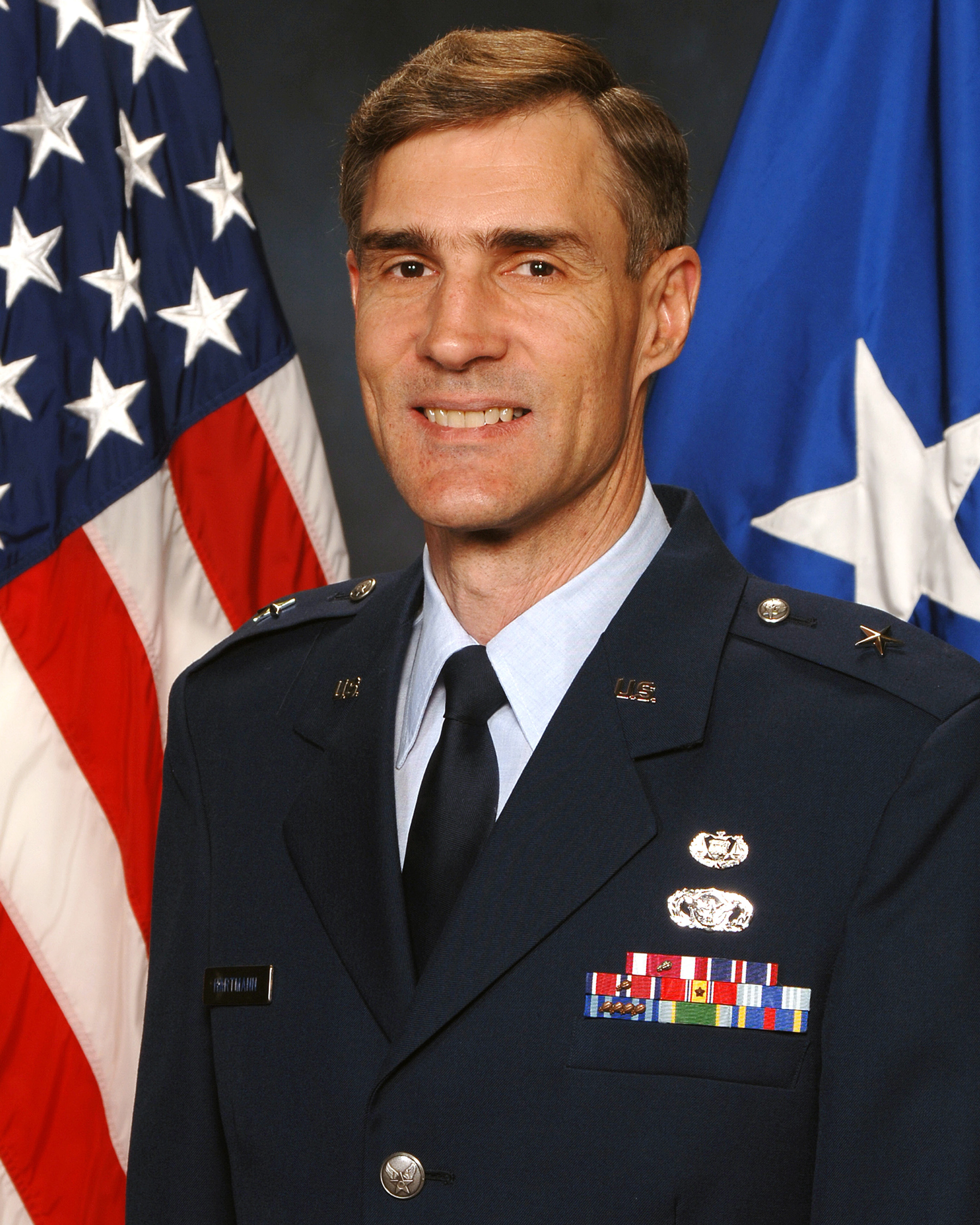
Brigadier General, Thomas W. Hartmann, USAFR

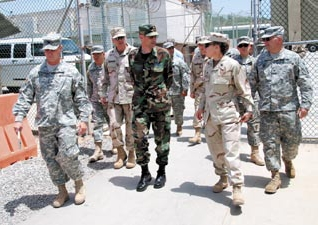
Brigadier General Thomas W. Hartmann tours Guantanamo.

Thomas W. Hartmann is an American lawyer and officer in the United States Air Force Reserve. He has 32 years of criminal, commercial and civil litigation experience. Between 1983 and 1991 he was a prosecutor and defense counsel in the Air Force, including duties as Chief Air Force Prosecutor in Asia-Pacific Region. From 1991 to 1996 he was an associate at Bryan Cave LLP and at SBC Communications (now AT&T). In 1996 he became senior counsel for mergers & acquisitions for SBC Communications closing multiple deals worth several billion dollars in U.S., Europe, and South America as well as negotiating a strategic partnering agreement with a global internet service provider. From 1998 onwards he was general counsel for SBC Communications (1999–2001), Orius Corp. (2001–2004) and MxEnergy Inc. (2005–2007) in domestic and international settings. In July 2007 Brigadier General Hartmann was appointed the legal adviser to the convening authority in the Department of Defense Office of Military Commissions. In September 2008, as a result of the expansion of the commission efforts that Hartmann had led, Deputy Secretary of Defense Gordon England elevated Hartmann to become the director of operations, planning, and development for the commissions. Hartmann reported to Susan J. Crawford, a retired judge, who was the convening authority until March 2010.

== Private sector work ==
Hartmann has handled cases in the areas of contract disputes, civil rights, sexual and racial discrimination, interference with business relations, violation of non-compete clauses, breach of employment contracts, denial of unemployment benefits, employment rights, overtime reporting failures, construction, business defamation, and fraud. Hartmann served as a general counsel for several medium-sized enterprises (up to $1B in revenue). He has negotiated many hundreds of business disputes in favor of his clients, shepherded a company through bankruptcy in 56 days, and overseen the effort to gain temporary restraining orders in emergencies. Hartmann has negotiated commercial transactions in the U.S., Europe, and South America worth billions of dollars. Additionally, he has been in charge of Human Resources, Safety, Collections, Insurance, Benefits, Public Affairs, and Regulatory and has saved many millions of dollars through streamlining, cost cutting, better risk management, benefit renegotiation, and improved safety. He has worked with boards, board committees and bankers. Hartmann also has experience with arbitrations and mediations.

=== Civil litigator as associate at Bryan Cave LLP and at SBC Communications ===
Hartmann was a civil litigator as an associate at Bryan Cave LLP and at SBC Communications (now AT&T) from 1991 to 1996. During the course of his time at Bryan Cave LLP and SBC Communications (now AT&T), Hartmann covered cases involving equal opportunity employment, personal injury and products liability, sexual discrimination, contract breaches and fraud, employment status and unemployment, international attachments, state wage-payment class action, government contract and bid protest disputes, as well as pension rights. During the course of these cases, Hartmann was on at least one occasion first chair at a fully litigated federal trial. He also won two prisoner-rights arguments as well as multiple favorable summary judgments before Missouri's Supreme Court. He also successfully led arbitration worth $100 million and won SBC's Best Summary Judgment Brief Award.

=== General counsel with SBC Communications, Orius Corp., and MxEnergy Inc. ===
Between 1999 and 2009 Hartmann was general counsel with SBC Communications (1999–2001), Orius Corp. (2001–2004) and MxEnergy Inc. (2005–2007). Over the course of his career as general counsel, Hartmann resolved several hundred critical litigation matters including workers' compensation, business and contract disputes, and class actions. Apart from litigation, Hartmann also led successful arbitrations and mediations on multimillion-dollar matters as well as the effort to obtain two temporary restraining orders in N.Y. federal court to end a business-halting dispute. Additionally, Hartmann drafted and negotiated thousands of business, intercreditor, security, subordination, credit and lease agreements. He also directed regulatory compliance in 12 states for collections, procurement centralization, real estate, HR, Safety, and Benefits.

== Air Force roles ==
Hartmann served on active duty (1977-1991 & 2007–2009) and in a reserve capacity (1991–2007) in the United States Air Force for 32 years, retiring as a brigadier general in December 2009. In his early career (1978–1980) General Hartmann was a Security Forces Shift Commander (1978–1980). In this role he oversaw leadership, training, and performance of 90 airmen for the security of nuclear weapons and initiated an antiterrorist training program. As a reservist Hartmann held leadership positions with increasing responsibility at base, Numbered Air Force, Major Command and Air Staff levels. He helped lead a special trial advocacy training program and was recognized with the Outstanding Judge Advocate award, Headquarters, Air Force Reserve, in 1993. Hartmann's other active duty awards include: Chanute AFB Outstanding Company Grade Officer, Regional Finalist, White House Fellowship, 320 Bombardment Wing Junior Officer of the Year, Outstanding Performer, Calif. State and Sacramento AF Associations, Outstanding Young Man of America, and Honor Graduate of the Security Police Academy.

=== Prosecutor and defense counsel ===
Hartmann was Chief Air Force Prosecutor in the Asia-Pacific Region between 1983 and 1991. He litigated in excess of 100 cases before judges and juries. These cases covered murder, manslaughter, rape, sexual assault, child sexual abuse, theft, drug conspiracies and alcohol-related crimes. In the course of these cases General Hartmann worked with experts in forensic pathology, oral and maxilla facial surgery, orthopedics, ophthalmology, hematology, neurosurgery, pediatric neurosurgery, neurology, drug testing, psychology, and psychiatry.

=== Legal adviser to the convening authority ===
==== Responsibilities ====
Hartmann volunteered to return to active duty as military commissions legal advisor and then director of operations (COO) in 2007. As legal advisor Hartmann oversaw investigation, proof analysis, charging, and inter-governmental coordination on cases involving conspiracy, murder, and war-related crimes. As part of this role he briefed the Deputy Secretary of Defense weekly. Hartmann also briefed Attorneys General Holder and Mukasey and other senior government leaders on the commissions system. He reduced the contract setup time from 12 months to 1 month. Hartmann also increased the number of cases charged from 3 to 25 and accelerated the security clearance process. He oversaw the building of sophisticated courtrooms and significantly expanded other physical facilities. Under his leadership, the staff grew from 50 to over 250.

==== Dispute with Colonel Morris Davis, senior Guantanamo prosecutor ====
Colonel Morris Davis, the Guantanamo military commission's senior prosecutor, complained that Hartmann was overstepping his authority. He has issued a statement where he wrote:

...for the good of the process.... If he believes in military commissions as strongly as I do then let's do the right thing and both of us walk away before we do more harm.

The Wall Street Journal reported that Davis and Hartmann had clashed over which captives should face charges. Its report states that Davis had refused to charge any more captives until the dispute was resolved. Its report also stated that William J. Haynes, II, the Pentagon's chief counsel, had assigned the chief judge of the Army Court of Criminal Appeals, Brigadier General Butch Tate to conduct an inquiry into the dispute. Tate's report backed Hartmann. The Wall Street Journal reports:

Because Gen. Hartmann is the superior officer, "Davis is obliged to heed the orders of Hartmann whether or not he likes them, so long as they're lawful," the official said. "And there's no indication that he's issued any unlawful orders."

The Wall Street Journal speculated as to two areas the two officers' dispute could be focused around:

- the possibility of plea bargain negotiations with Salim Ahmed Hamdan, one of Osama bin Laden's drivers;
- Davis's preference to confine his charges to captives for whom there was unclassified evidence, so the trials could be open to the press.

The Wall Street Journal also quotes a source regarding Hartmann's motivation to accelerate the progress of cases:

"Gen. Hartmann has voiced complaints that the prosecution remained, after four years, still unready to try cases," says a lawyer familiar with the situation. "It's his frustration with their 'can't do' approach."

On November 8, 2007, before Guantanamo captive Omar Khadr's military commission, his military defense counsel, Lieutenant Commander William Keubler revealed that he had been informed just two days earlier about an eyewitness whose testimony could help clear Khadr. Major Jeff Groharing told reporters, in the courtroom, that Hartmann had ordered him not to talk about the case.

According to Jennifer Daskal, an attorney at Human Rights Watch:

It is totally outrageous that the prosecution would try to push ahead with a hearing on whether or not Khadr was an unlawful enemy combatant, while all the time withholding from the defence potentially exculpatory information. Anyone who has ever gone to law school knows the fundamental legal and ethical rule: The prosecution cannot withhold exculpatory information from the defence.

==== Disqualified from participation ====
Captain Keith Allred, the presiding Officer of Salim Ahmed Hamdan's military commission, disqualified Hartmann from participating in Hamdan's prosecution.

He ordered that Hartmann be replaced. In a pre-trial hearing for Mohammed Jawad, Hartmann defended his "intense and direct" management style.

On August 14, 2008 Colonel Stephen Henley barred Hartmann from future participation in Mohammed Jawad's commission. Henley had arranged for depositions to be taken from other officers at Guantanamo, including US Navy Captain Patrick M. McCarthy, who testified that Hartmann had personally berated him. The Associated Press reported that Jawad's attorney David Frakt was authorized to submit arguments directly to Susan J. Crawford, the convening authority, as to whether charges against Jawad were justified.

Frakt and chief prosecutor Lawrence Morris both told reporters they anticipated that Hartmann's role in other Guantanamo commissions would be challenged. Morris stated, "We are going to have to address those in court."

The Associated Press reported that, in his testimony on August 13, 2008, Hartmann testified that he would not resign over his behavior because he believed he was doing his job properly.

In his August 14, 2008 ruling Henley wrote:

... a Legal Advisor's post trial responsibilities necessitate he act in a quasi-judicial role; one where he must remain neutral and unbiased. The Commission finds the current Legal Advisor's editorial writings and interviews defending the military commissions' system combined with his active and vocal support of and desire to manage the military commissions process and public statements appearing to directly align himself with the prosecution team have compromised the objectivity necessary to dispassionately and fairly evaluate the evidence and prepare the post trial recommendation.

Henley also noted that one of Hartmann's responsibilities was to review and summarize for the convening authority pre-trial arguments from the defense. Jawad's defense team had filed pre-trial arguments, which Hartmann reviewed, and which he failed to forward and summarize for the convening authority. Henley noted that Hartmann failed to explain why he failed to forward or summarize the defense's arguments for the convening authority.

Henley anticipated that Hartmann's failures to perform his duties during the pre-trial period would be arguments the defense would want to submit to the convening authority during the post-trial period. He stated a new Legal Advisor, one not associated with Hartmann, would have to advise the convening authority on how to address Hartmann's actions.

In testimony at a pre-trial hearing for Jawad on August 20, 2008 US Army Brigadier General Gregory Zanetti, deputy prison camps commander at Guantanamo, described Hartmann as, "abusive, bullying and unprofessional...pretty much across the board."

On September 4, 2008 Colonel Patrick Parrish barred Hartmann from participating in Omar Khadr's tribunal because of his "undue command influence". Khadr's tribunal is the third that Hartmann has been barred from participating in.

On September 19, 2008 Hartmann was removed from his position as legal advisor and transferred to a position as Director of Operations, Planning and Development for Military Commissions. Hartmann was replaced by his deputy Michael Chapman, who had been the deputy legal advisor since April 2005.

Hartmann attributed his removal, and appointment to the new position, to the "explosive growth of the commissions over the last 10 or 12 months."

When contacted by Time magazine for comment a spokesman for Hartmann said he was not available for interviews and would have no comment. However Deputy Secretary of Defense Gordon England, the Pentagon's second highest official, was willing to comment, saying:

Misunderstandings of the military commission process have led to confusion and controversy. In this environment, BGEN Tom Hartmann has been the steady hand to ensure that the process is open, fair and just. I am grateful for his strong, focused and effective leadership during these dangerous and challenging times.

On August 24, 2009, Carol Rosenberg, writing in the Miami Herald wrote about Jawad's case that: "His case gained prominence when the Pentagon's legal advisor for military commissions, Air Force Brig. General Thomas Hartmann, found his file among those being considered for war crimes prosecution and propelled it to the top of the pile, in part because there were victims who could testify -- former, wounded reserve soldiers back in California."

==== Retirement request ====
On 2 November 2008 Carol Rosenberg, writing in the Miami Herald, reported that Hartmann had filed a request to retire from the Air Force on 17 February 2008. Hartmann's boss at the Pentagon, William J. Haynes, had resigned in February.

==== Obama briefing ====
William Glaberson, writing in The New York Times, reported that Hartmann had been rehearsing a briefing he hoped to make to incoming President Barack Obama aides. According to Glaberson, Hartmann declined to respond to the reports of his briefing rehearsals, but he did issue a statement: "grateful for his strong, focused and effective leadership during these dangerous and challenging times. The Office of Military Commissions stands ready to support any and all of President-elect Obama's transition team requests."

== Education history ==
Hartmann is an honor graduate of the United States Air Force Academy. He also holds a Master of Arts degree from Stanford University and a Juris Doctor with High Honors from George Washington University Law School. Hartmann is a member of the Order of the Coif.

== See also ==
- Director of Operations, Planning and Development for Military Commissions
