= Olds (Netook) Airport =

- IATA: none; ICAO: none; TC LID: CFK6

Summary
- Airport type: Public
- Operator: Air Cadet League of Canada
- Location: Mountain View County, near Olds, Alberta
- Time zone: Alberta Time (UTC−06:00)
- Elevation AMSL: 3,330 ft / 1,015 m
- Coordinates: 51°50′51″N 114°03′53″W

Map
- Location in Alberta

Runways
Direction	Length		Surface
Direction	ft	m	Surface
01/19	3,716	1,133	Turf
14/32	4,370	1,332	Turf
- Source: Canada Flight Supplement

Olds (Netook) Airport (TC LID: CFK6) is located 3.5 nautical miles (6.5 km; 4.0 mi) north of Olds, Alberta, Canada. The airport is owned and operated by the Air Cadet League of Canada Alberta Provincial Committee. It is home to the Netook Gliding Centre, one of five Air Cadet Gliding Program locations in Alberta.

== History ==
The airfield was built in 1941 by the Royal Canadian Air Force as part of the British Commonwealth Air Training Plan, and served as a relief field for No. 32 Elementary Flying Training School at Bowden, Alberta.

=== Aerodrome ===
In approximately 1942, the aerodrome was listed at 51°51′N 114°04′W with a Var. 24 degrees E and elevation of 3325'. The Aerodrome was listed as "turf" and "all way field." There is no dimensional data and the field was drawn as a rough square along the Canadian Pacific Railway line.

== See also ==
- Olds-Didsbury Airport
