= Director of Operations, Planning and Development for Military Commissions =

Role in the United States military

The Director of Operations, Planning and Development for Military Commissions serves as the point of contact between the Office of Military Commissions and other United States military and civilian agencies. The position was created on 19 September 2008.

== Reporting structure ==
The position was to be filled by a flag officer, who was to report directly to the Department of Defense's General Counsel, who was at the time William J. Haynes. Haynes has subsequently resigned, and the first Director reported to United States Deputy Secretary of Defense Gordon R. England and acting General Counsel Daniel J. Dell'Orto.

== Directors ==
The first officer to be appointed Director was Brigadier Thomas W. Hartmann a military lawyer in the United States Air Force Reserve. Hartmann had previously been the Legal Advisor to the Convening Authority for the Office of Military Commissions. The Convening Authority is a civilian position, currently held by VADM Bruce MacDonald, the former TJAG of the US Navy (Pentagon). As Legal Advisor Hartmann was essentially the second-in-command.

Hartmann had been reassigned from the position of Legal Advisor after the officers Presiding over three separate Guantanamo military commissions had barred him from participation after he was accused of putting "undue command influence" on Prosecutors. On 2 November 2008 Carol Rosenberg, writing in the Miami Herald, reported that Hartmann had filed a request to retire from the Air Force on 17 February 2008.

Hartmann was replaced by his deputy Michael Chapman, who had been the deputy Legal Advisor since April 2005.

Hartmann attributed his reassignment, and appointment to the new position, to the "explosive growth of the commissions over the last 10 or 12 months."

The Air Force described Hartmann new appointment as a promotion. Hartmann's boss at the Pentagon, William J. Haynes, had resigned in February.

The Operations Director position was "civilianized" in the fall of 2009 following Hartman's retirement. The current Director of Operations, Ward K. Johnson, III, was appointed to the post in November 2009. Johnson had previously served on active duty with the U.S. Army as a Branch Chief, Presiding Officer and Tribunal President with the Office for the Administrative Review of the Detention of Enemy Combatants under the control of Deputy Secretary of Defense England. Johnson had previously served as Director of Operations of the North Dakota National Guard, Provost Marshal for the North Dakota Joint Forces Headquarters, and Commander of the North Dakota Joint Training Center among other senior positions in the North Dakota National Guard. Johnson is a 2005 graduate of the United States Army War College and has been a lawyer licensed to practice law since 1988.
