= Rebecca S. Snyder =

American lawyer

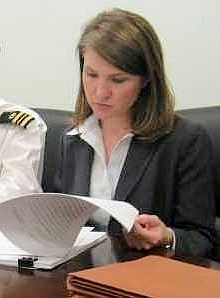
Rebecca Snyder, while working on Omar Khadr's case.

Rebecca S. Snyder is an American appellate defense attorney in Washington DC. She is notable for her work, along with Lt. Cmdr. William Kuebler, as counsel for Omar Khadr, a detainee at Guantanamo Bay detention camp, charged with murder for the death of an American soldier during a skirmish in Afghanistan on July 27, 2002.

Snyder was commissioned as a lieutenant in the United States Navy. She served in the Judge Advocate General Corps.

Snyder has worked in the field of securities exchange in her civilian practice at Paul, Hastings, Janofsky & Walker.

Snyder represented Omar Khadr as a civilian employee of the Department of Defense. As part of her efforts on Khadr's behalf Snyder appeared before the Human Rights subcommittee of the Parliament of Canada. The next day Snyder and Kuebler met with Stéphane Dion, leader of the Opposition.

On February 4, 2008 Snyder argued that even if Khadr had killed an American soldier during the invasion of Afghanistan, it was not a war crime since killing soldiers was "part of what war is about". However, the U.S. position that Khadr should be tried at the military tribunal as he operated without a uniform and quartered himself amongst civilians contra to the Laws of Land Warfare was summed up by Marine Corps Maj. Jeffrey Groharing, who said "The accused and the terrorists he was working with did not belong to a legitimate army. They belonged to al-Qaeda,":

On January 13, 2009, Snyder was quoted predicting that charges against Khadr would be dropped, when Barack Obama became president. According to the National Post she said:

We can't imagine that the new president will move to close the camps without also addressing the military commissions. Otherwise, it may seem that he may end up giving [Mohammed] [sic] a fairer trial than Omar Khadr, a former child soldier.
