= Canadian detainees at Guantanamo Bay =

The United States Department of Defense acknowledges holding two Canadian captives in Guantanamo, two teenage brothers, Abdurahman Khadr and Omar Khadr. A total of 778 captives have been held in extrajudicial detention in the Guantanamo Bay detention camps, in Cuba since the camps opened on January 11, 2002 The camp population peaked in 2004 at approximately 660. Only nineteen new captives, all "high value detainees" have been transferred there since the United States Supreme Court's ruling in Rasul v. Bush. In January 2008 there were approximately 285 detainees.

== Abdurahman Khadr ==
Abdurahman has described himself as the "black sheep" of his family, who was disgusted by the celebrations he witnessed of the attacks on September 11, 2001. He reported that he cooperated fully with the Americans, eventually agreeing to serve as a mole for the CIA, first in Guantanamo Bay detention camps, and later in Bosnia, where he was tasked to win the trust of Arab veterans of the Bosnian War of Independence.

== Omar Khadr ==
Omar was captured after a skirmish in Afghanistan on July 27, 2002, where he was accused of throwing a grenade which fatally wounded Christopher Speer, an American Special Forces Sergeant.

== Canadian residents and former residents in Afghanistan ==
In addition Guantanamo held approximately half a dozen men who had lived in Canada, either as refugees, candidates for citizenship, or illegal immigrants.

== Guantanamo Bay files leak ==
On April 25, 2011, the Guantanamo Bay files leak started. These previously unpublished documents had been drafted by Joint Task Force Guantanamo, whereas all the previously published documents from Guantanamo had been drafted by the Office for the Administrative Review of the Detention of Enemy Combatants of the Office of Military Commissions. Sixteen captives secret files were not leaked, including Abdurahman Khadr's.
