= Michael Chapman (lawyer) =

American lawyer

- Occupation: Lawyer
- Known for: Legal adviser to the Office of Military Commissions, in Guantanamo

Michael Chapman is an American lawyer, and former senior officer in the United States Army's Judge Advocate General corps, who was appointed the legal adviser to the Office of Military Commissions, in Guantanamo on September 19, 2008. According to the official press release that announced his appointment his previous appointments included being:

- senior judge for the U.S. Army Court of Criminal Appeals;
- deputy commandant and director of academics at the Army's JAG school in Charlottesville, Virginia;
- senior military defense counsel during Operation Desert Storm.

== William J. Kreutzer Jr. ==
Chapman sat on the appeal of William J. Kreutzer Jr.'s murder conviction while serving on the Army Court of Criminal Appeals. Sergeant Kreutzer had been convicted of opening fire on his comrades at Fort Bragg, killing one, and injuring seventeen. Two of the officers who have presided over Omar Khadr's Guantanamo military commissions, Peter Brownback and Patrick Parrish, presided over Kreutzer's court-martial.

== Service for the Office of Military Commissions, in Guantanamo ==
The Office of Military Commissions manages the Guantanamo military commissions, appointing the officers who judge, prosecute and defend the captives who are charged, as well as authorizing the final approval of those charges. The Office is headed by a civilian official called the "Appointing Authority", currently Susan J. Crawford. The Appointing Authority's deputy is called the Advisor to the appointing authority. In April 2005, Chapman was appointed deputy legal advisor, number three in the hierarchy.

=== Temporary suspension ===
In July 2007, a new legal advisor was appointed, Brigadier General Thomas W. Hartmann. Hartmann and former Chief Prosecutor Colonel Morris Davis had an acrimonious relationship. Davis had publicly aired his concerns that Hartmann had become too involved in managing the prosecution, including picking which captives should be prosecuted. Davis felt picking the captives to be charged was his job, and pointed out that Hartmann's role required him to be impartial, because he was also supposed to advise the Appointing Authority about the functioning of the Defense team.

While DoD authorities were conducting their inquiry into Morris's concerns Crawford directed that both Hartmann, and Chapman, his deputy, were temporarily removed from their responsibilities. A more junior official Ron White, was to take on the responsibilities of both men.

=== Appointment as Legal Advisor ===
When Chapman's was appointed to replace his superior, Thomas W. Hartmann, Hartmann was transferred to the position of director of operations, planning and development for the military commissions. According to The Washington Post Morris Davis was critical of Hartmann and Chapman's new appointments, and noted:

'Elevating his deputy and leaving him in the process, I'm afraid, will be like the Vladimir Putin-Dmitry Medvedev relationship where there's some real doubt over who pulls the strings,' said Col. Morris Davis, a former chief military prosecutor at Guantanamo Bay, Cuba, drawing a parallel to the Russian prime minister and the protégé he helped elevate to the presidency.
