= Peter Masciola =

American Colonel

Colonel Peter Masciola served as the Chief Defense Counsel for the Office of Military Commissions in 2008 and 2009. He was appointed in the fall of 2008. Masciola was President of the Judge Advocate Association in 2001–2002.

On 16 January 2009, Masciola wrote:

The perception of pervasive torture now saddles the incoming administration and its efforts to set these proceedings on a just course. There is only one way to begin changing that perception, and also the reality, of fundamental injustice: Withdraw the referrals now.

Masciola stirred controversy in April 2009 when he fired William Kuebler, Guantanamo captive Omar Khadr's senior military counsel. Kuebler, in turn, suggested Masciola of a conflict of interest.

The two men have a difference of opinion as to what should happen to Khadr. Kuebler thinks Khadr should be repatriated to Canada, and undergo a supervised re-entry into civilian life. Masciola thinks Khadr's case should be transferred to the US civilian justice system.

Steven Edwards, writing in the Ottawa Citizen, reported that Kuebler had, coincidentally, been called into Masciola's office when Masciola received the phone call that informed him that Colonel Patrick Parrish had overruled him. Citing an unnamed source the Citizen reported that Masciola was "not at all pleased" to learn Parrish wanted to overrule him. Masciola did not accept Parrish's ruling, and continued to decline to allow Keubler to meet with Khadr, to access the case file. According to the unnamed source:

When the ruling came down, Col. Masciola said that he thought the judge was wrong and ordered Lt.-Cmdr. Kuebler to leave the office. Lt.-Cmdr. Kuebler asked to use the phone and he was told that he was not a member of the office and could not use any office equipment.

Masciola asserted that the Office of Military Commissions rules did not oblige the provision of a particular lawyer. Steven Edwards, writing in the Ottawa Citizen, reported that the Canadian government believed Khadr was entitled to representation by "counsel of his choice", and speculated that Masciola's actions may trigger diplomatic repercussions.

Parrish scheduled a hearing for 1 June 2009, to consider whether Keubler should remain as Khadr's counsel.
