= RCAF Station Bowden =

Air station in Alberta, Canada

- Near Bowden, Alberta in Canada

Site information
- Owner: Dept of National Defence (Canada)

Location
- Coordinates: 51°59′N 114°01′W

Site history
- In use: 1941-4

Garrison information
- Occupants: No. 32 E.F.T.S.(1941-4);

Airfield information
- Elevation: 3,100 ft (940 m) AMSL
Runways
Direction	Length and surface
15/33	3,050 ft (930 m) Hard Surface
9/27	3,050 ft (930 m) Hard Surface
3/21	3,050 ft (930 m) Hard Surface

RCAF Station Bowden was a Second World War British Commonwealth Air Training Plan (BCATP) station located near Bowden, Alberta, Canada. It was operated and administered by the Royal Canadian Air Force (RCAF).

== History ==
=== World War II ===
RCAF Station Bowden was constructed as a component of the British Commonwealth Air Training Plan near the community of Bowden, Alberta. It was originally opened by the Royal Air Force, as an elementary flying training school (No. 32 EFTS) on 12 July 1941. The Station had over 100 students at the time. On 20 July 1942 it was taken over by the Edmonton Flying Club. Eventually, it had over 240 students and over 150 aircraft on strength. The aircraft used were initially Tiger Moths and later Cornells. Stearman aircraft were also used. RCAF Station Bowden was closed on 8 September 1944.

=== Aerodrome ===
In approximately 1942 the aerodrome was listed at 51°59′N 114°01′W with a Var. 24 degrees E and elevation of 3,100 ft (940 m). 3 runways were listed as follows:

Runway Name	Length	Width	Surface
7/25	3,050 ft (930 m)	150 ft (46 m)	Hard surfaced
12/30	3,050 ft (930 m)	150 ft (46 m)	Hard surfaced
1/19	3,050 ft (930 m)	150 ft (46 m)	Hard surfaced

=== Relief landing field – Netook ===
The primary Relief Landing Field (R1) for RCAF Station Bowden was located approximately halfway between Bowden and Olds, Alberta. The relief field is now being operated as Olds (Netook) Airport.

== Present Day ==
The aerodrome is now completely removed and the site is now the location of the Bowden Institution
