= Katherine Porterfield =

American child psychologist

Kate Porterfield is an American child psychologist with a background in treating survivors of torture. She is a staff psychologist at the Bellevue/NYU Program for Survivors of Torture at New York City's Bellevue Hospital. Porterfield is also on Faculty at New York University's Medical School.

== Education ==
Porterfield earned her PhD at the University of Michigan in 1998.

== Career ==
Porterfield's advice was cited as New York City coped with the trauma of al Qaeda's surprise attacks on September 11, 2001. Porterfield has been called upon to serve as a public speaker on the effects of torture on children. Porterfield is also an expert in using art therapy and improvisational theater to reach traumatized children. Porterfield was later called upon by the Center for Constitutional Rights to provide training in how to address torture survivors for the attorneys who volunteered to serve on behalf of Guantanamo captives. She also helped Guantanamo captives' attorneys to deal with transferred trauma—trauma felt after hearing about torture. Porterfield is the first psychologist authorized to travel to Guantanamo to conduct a psychological evaluation of a captive—visiting Omar Khadr, a captive who was captured when he was fifteen years old. She has also worked with Amanda Lindhout, following her release from Somali captivity in December 2009.

In 2016, Porterfield testified in the trial of Lisa Montgomery. In 2023, she testified as a defense witness in the trial of Robert Bowers.
