= William Kreutzer Jr. =

American soldier and murderer (born 1969)

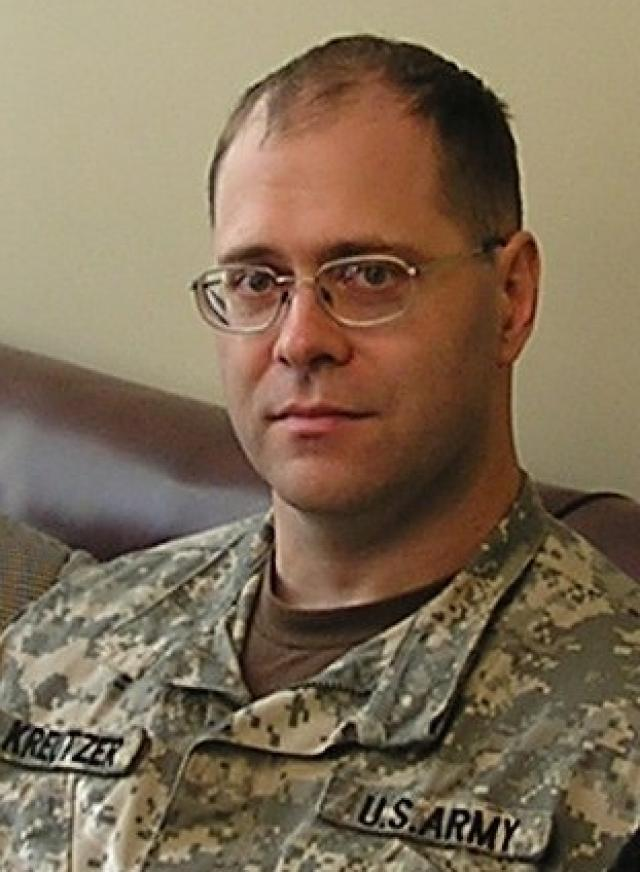
- William Kreutzer Jr.
- Born: 1969 (age 56–57); United States
- Status: Incarcerated
- Convictions: Premeditated murder Attempted premeditated murder (17 counts); Violating a lawful general regulation Larceny of government munitions
- Penalty: Death; commuted to life imprisonment

Details
- Date: October 27, 1995
- Location: Fort Bragg, North Carolina
- Killed: 1
- Injured: 18
- Imprisoned at: United States Disciplinary Barracks
- Military career
- Allegiance: United States
- Branch: United States Army
- Service years: 1992–1996 (Dishonorable discharge)
- Rank: Private; Sergeant (pre-conviction)
- Units: Former member of the 325th Infantry Regiment, 82nd Airborne Division
- Awards: Non-Commissioned Officer Professional Development Ribbon, Army Service Ribbon, Overseas Service Ribbon

William J. Kreutzer Jr. (born 1969) is a former United States Army soldier who was convicted of killing one officer and wounding 18 other soldiers when he opened fire on a physical training formation on October 27, 1995, at Fort Bragg, North Carolina. Kreutzer was sentenced to death, but his sentence was later commuted to life in prison by the Army Court of Criminal Appeals in connection with concerns regarding mental illness.

== Biography ==
At trial, Kreutzer's high school vice principal Ms. Witczak testified that he was an "above average" student. He graduated from the University of Maryland. At the time of the shootings, Kreutzer's father was facing criminal charges for sex crimes against a teenage girl a decade earlier.

Kreutzer entered the Army in February 1992. By March 1993, Kreutzer was assigned to the 325th Airborne Infantry Regiment of the 82nd Airborne Division, and the following January followed the unit to deployment in the Sinai.

During his time in the military, Kreutzer reported being the butt of practical jokes and teasing from fellow soldiers. In the past, Kreutzer had reportedly told a friend that he knew what the record number of people killed in a rampage shooting was and earned himself the nickname "Crazy Kreutzer".

In June 1994, Kreutzer broke down in tears while on guard duty in the Sinai and spoke of killing several other soldiers. He was disciplined and sent to see the division's social worker, Darren Fong, who said he suffered from low self-esteem and anger management problems. He was deemed to not be a threat but was disallowed weapons for two weeks following the incident.

In October 1994, Kreutzer attended the Primary Leadership Development Course to become a non-commissioned officer and was promoted to the rank of sergeant.

== Fort Bragg shooting ==
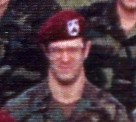
Kreutzer in 1992 while assigned to XVIII Abn Corps LRSC

The day before the shooting, Kreutzer confided in his former roommate SPC Robert Harlan that he needed to talk to Fong again. When Harlan tried to calm him down, he replied "No, Harlan, it's not going to be all right."

After the discussion, Kreutzer telephoned SPC Burl Mays to inform him that he would be opening fire on the calisthenics field the next morning. Mays noticed Kreutzer missing at 5 am, and alerted his superiors who dismissed the claim, saying that Kreutzer was a "pussy", but gave Mays permission to check Kreutzer's room, where he found a copy of his will.

Early on the morning of October 27, 1995, Kreutzer hid in a tree line adjacent to a housing area alongside Towle Stadium APF field and opened fire on his brigade formation assembled in the stadium, wounding 18 soldiers. He was armed with a 5.56×45mm NATO PacWest Arms AR-15-style semi-automatic rifle and a .22-caliber Ruger 10/22 semi-automatic rifle; as well as a Glock 17 Gen 2 9mm semi-automatic pistol and a Spyderco folding knife.

Several Special Forces soldiers, including SFC Tony Minor, SFC Bob Howes, SGT Edward Mongold, and SFC Paul Rogers were conducting a physical training run when they observed gunfire erupt from Towle Stadium. They took cover in the woods between the stadium and Bastogne Dr., which placed them behind Kreutzer during the shooting, before several unarmed members of 325th Airborne Brigade Staff, led by the Regimental XO LTC Mike Kerrigan, hastily assaulted frontally into the position Kreutzer was firing from, forcing him to move several times and retreat into the woods.

In the midst of this, Kreutzer shot Major Stephen Badger (Regimental S2) and Major Guy Lo Faro (Regimental Adjutant) with the rifle as the Brigade Staff assaulted and pursued him, killing Major Badger instantly with a shot to the head as CPT Cole Bricker (Brigade S3 Battle Captain) and 1LT George Lewis (Assistant Regimental S2) closed in from the right side of the Brigade Staff assault line while Kreutzer fled through the woods. When Kreutzer turned to open fire on them, he was tackled to the ground by two of the SF soldiers who had sought cover in the woods but suddenly found Kreutzer in the middle of their hiding position. CPT Bricker and 1LT Lewis assisted them, and after a struggle with Kreutzer, disarmed him. Afterwards, they escorted Kreutzer from the woods to a position near Bastogne Rd., where armed Military Police took him into custody.

Several SF soldiers were awarded the Soldier's Medal, as were Majors Badger (posthumously) and Lo Faro. SFC Matt Lewis C/2-82 AVN was also awarded the Soldiers Medal for providing emergency first aid while under fire to CW2 Abe Castillo who was shot in the back.

== After the shootings ==
After arriving at the Criminal Investigation Division office, Kreutzer waived his rights and again asked to speak with Fong, who had since been reassigned. A psychiatrist, Dr. Diamond, was provided instead, since Kreutzer had invoked his right to silence and an attorney and refused to speak to the military police. Diamond interviewed Kreutzer and reported that he seemed delusional and severely distraught.

The following day, Lt. Cmdr Messer (also a doctor of psychiatry) performed a suicide assessment, and declared that there were "definite mental health issues" involved. The following week, Kreutzer asked to speak to a private civilian psychiatrist, for which he would pay. Dr. Rollins attended Kreutzer until he was unable to continue paying the psychiatric bills.

On December 8, a board of doctors from the military hospital deemed Kreutzer mentally fit to stand trial.

Colonel Peter Brownback presided over the trial. During the trial, Kreutzer claimed, "I wanted to send a message to the chain-of-command that had forgotten the welfare of the common soldier."

Kreutzer was assigned as prisoner 76651-95-01 on the US Military's death row at the United States Disciplinary Barracks Fort Leavenworth. Colonel James Currie of the Army Court of Criminal Appeals commuted Kreutzer's death sentence, citing that his lawyer had not properly informed the courts of his client's mental illnesses. Colonel Michael Chapman participated as one of the appellate judges who heard the appeal.

On March 10, 2009, Kreutzer re-pleaded guilty to one count of premeditated murder and attempted premeditated murder, and 16 counts of aggravated assault. The plea deal would spare him the death penalty, and he faced up to life in prison. Military justice, as a rule, does provide for parole of prisoners, though it is unclear whether Kreutzer will qualify for parole within his natural life span.

On March 24, 2009, after a trial at Fort Bragg, Kreutzer was formally convicted of one specification of premeditated murder, 18 specifications of attempted murder, one specification of violating a general order by transporting weapons on post, and one specification of larceny of government property (theft of government ammunition).

Prior to his sentencing, Kreutzer stood at attention while a member of his defense team read his unsworn statement to members of the court:

To each and every person that I hurt directly by shooting them; and to each and every person affected by my actions, whether it be a family member, loved one, co-worker, neighbor or friend - I offer my most heartfelt, sincere apology to each of you ... Words are inadequate to express the deep sense of shame and remorse that I feel for the harm that I caused. I apologize and am deeply sorry for what I have done.

According to the Army News Service, in Kreutzer's unsworn statement, he closed with saying he can't change the past, so his heartfelt and sincere desire was to provide any measure of help, closure, and comfort he can to all of his victims.

Another member of Kreutzer's defense team made brief remarks, suggesting clemency in the sentencing since Kreutzer had been a role model prisoner for the past 13 years. Colonel Patrick Parrish, the military judge at Fort Bragg, then ruled that in addition to life in prison, Kreutzer should be reduced in rank to E-1, forfeit pay and allowances, and be given a dishonorable discharge.

== Charges ==
Kreutzer pleaded guilty to 20 counts in relation to the shooting:

- The premeditated murder of Maj Stephen Badger,
- 17 counts of attempted premeditated murder,
- One count of violating a lawful general regulation, and
- One count of larceny of Government munitions.

Four counts of maiming, and 17 of 18 charges of aggravated assault against Kreutzer, were superseded by his pleas of guilty of attempted murder. The 18th charge of aggravated assault related to Staff Sgt. Robert Howes, who was shot in the foot during the struggle to disarm Kreutzer, was dropped in exchange for the rest of the guilty pleas.

== Victims ==
- Major Stephen Mark Badger, killed
- Major Guy Lo Faro, was in a coma (some of it drug-induced) for 45 days
- CWO Abraham Castillo, helicopter pilot paralyzed from neck down
- SPC Molon
- SPC Bridges
- PFC Spicer
- Specialist Curtis Hall
- SPC John Griffith, later Sergeant, who was KIA in Afghanistan on May 5, 2006.
- Sergeant First Class Jeffery Graves, 1-325 AIR.
- PFC Timothy Hrastinski
- SFC Matthew Lewis
- SSGT Robert Howes, shot in the foot
- SSGT Anthony Minor, hand got broken while struggling with the gunman

== See also ==
- 2002 John Allen Muhammad (Washington Sniper) killings
- 2003 Army private Hasan Akbar kills two US officers
- 2006 Steven D. Green
- 2007 Fort Dix attack plot
- 2009 Camp Liberty killings
- 2009 Little Rock recruiting office shooting
- 2009 Fort Hood shooting
- List of United States death row inmates
