= Gary Pittman =

American prison guard and Marine

Gary Pittman is a prison guard and former United States Marine Corps reservist who was received a reduction in rank from Sergeant to Private and 60 days hard labor, for his role in the death in custody of Nagem Hatab, an Iraqi he believed was involved in capturing Jessica Lynch.

Following his conviction the Federal Bureau of Prisons fired Pittman.
