= Layne Morris =

American special forces operative

SFC Layne Morris
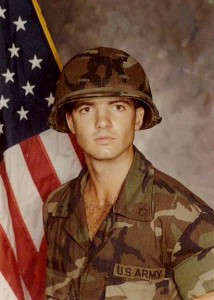
- Born: 1962 (age 63–64)
- Relatives: Leisl (spouse)
- Military career
- Allegiance: United States of America
- Branch: Army National Guard
- Service years: 1983–2002
- Rank: Sergeant First Class
- Unit: Utah Army National Guard: 19th Special Forces Group
- Conflicts: Global War on Terrorism; War in Afghanistan (WIA)
- Other work: Community Preservation Department Director (West Valley City, Utah)

Layne Morris (born 1962) is a retired American special forces operative. On July 27, 2002, he was wounded and blinded in one eye during a gunfight in Afghanistan that left American combat medic Christopher J. Speer dead, allegedly at the hands of the Canadian accused terrorist Omar Khadr.

"A piece of the hand grenade shrapnel cut the optic nerve, so I'm blind in one eye."

— Morris to 60 Minutes, 2007

Khadr, a Canadian child soldier of Egyptian and Palestinian descent, was captured by American troops at Ayub Kheyl shortly after the gunfight; he was alleged to have thrown the grenade that had killed Speer and wounded Morris, and was subsequently detained at Bagram Airfield. By late 2002, he was transferred to the Guantanamo Bay detention camp, where he eventually pled guilty to killing Speer. Khadr's lawyers allege that he was tortured into confessing. In 2012, Khadr was released from American custody and handed over to the Canadian government. Morris, along with Speer's widow, filed a civil suit against Khadr's father, who allegedly had close ties with al-Qaeda. Their claim held Khadr's father responsible for Khadr's actions, as the latter was a legal minor — aged 15 at the time of the incident.

Morris retired from the military. He returned to his home in Utah, where he became a housing director in West Valley City. He lives with his wife Leisl in South Jordan, a suburb of Salt Lake City. He appeared in the National Geographic Society program U.S. Army Special Forces in 2003 and also interviewed on 60 Minutes in 2007.

== Civil suit against Omar Khadr's family ==
The American government alleged that Khadr's Egyptian father Ahmed Khadr had been a close associate of Osama bin Laden and actively worked with members of al-Qaeda. In 2004, Ahmed was killed by Pakistani security forces in a gunfight near the Afghanistan–Pakistan border. Morris joined with Speer's widow Tabitha to file a civil suit against Ahmed's estate. His argument, then, was that since Omar was only 15, he could not be held responsible for his actions — but his father could.

Normally, "acts of war" are not subject to civil suits. However, Morris and Speer successfully argued that Khadr was a terrorist and not a soldier, so his actions were not exempted from civil suits.

"The family was all in Pakistan, I thought, all right, you made your choice, fine, have a nice life and I was okay with it. It was when they pulled out the Canadian passports and started waving them around to come back and take advantage of their free everything because it hadn't gone well for them – that was the point when I said, you know there's something additionally I can do."

— Sgt. Layne Morris

On February 16, 2006, American district judge Paul G. Cassell awarded Morris and Tabitha triple damages, totalling US$102.6 million. An article published in the June 14, 2007, The Salt Lake Tribune said that Morris and Tabitha might collect funds via the U.S. Terrorism Risk Insurance Act. An official from the U.S. Treasury Department had acknowledged that Ahmed's assets had been frozen, but said it was up to Morris and Speer to locate them. American senator Orrin Hatch had been asked to intervene and was "very interested" in the case.

In January 2008, an American attorney claimed that the federal government had "sovereign immunity" over the seized funds, asserting that it did not have to comply with a judgement in a civil suit:

"Although sovereign immunity may be waived, there is no waiver in this case."

— Motion submitted by Jeffrey A. Taylor, U.S. attorney

== Guantanamo military commissions ==
Omar Khadr was named as one of ten detainees who faced charges before special military commissions. These commissions were not courts-martial.

Guantanamo military commission chief prosecutor Morris D. Davis said, on January 10, 2006, that he planned to call Morris as a witness against Khadr; Morris was to testify that he knew he was injured by Khadr. On June 29, 2006, the U.S. Supreme Court upheld an earlier ruling that the commissions were unconstitutional because they had not been authorized by the U.S. Congress, and violated both the Uniform Code of Military Justice and the United States' obligations under the Geneva Conventions.

Morris told interviewers he was disappointed that the military commissions had been overturned:

- "It is justice delayed. I don't think that's a good thing ... I think those tribunals could have provided a trial viewed as fair by most of the world. In that sense, I think it is unfortunate,"
- "I guess I don't agree with giving these people all of the legal rights that citizens have,"
- "I think everyone on both sides of the political aisle just wants to see some sort of resolution to their status and I guess it's just going to take longer now to figure out how that process is going to work."

In 2008, a five-page statement from an American soldier who shot Khadr said that the youth had not been the only occupant of the compound to have survived the American aerial bombardment. He said further that Khadr had been shot in the back; he was sitting upright with his back to the skirmish. This cast doubt on assertions that Khadr had thrown the grenade that killed Speer.

In a telephone interview with Michelle Shephard of the Toronto Star, Morris insisted: "That was a total shock to me. Everyone had told me from the get-go that there was only one guy in there." He thought there was evidence that "Omar was the grenade man."

- "Instead of surrendering and calling it a day, he made the decision to wait until personnel got close enough that he could restart the battle, pop up and throw a hand grenade."
- "I'm fine with this dragging on for another five years before there's a trial as long as they stay locked up."

== Canada's settlement with the Khadr family ==
Morris criticized the Canadian government for paying out CA$10.5M to Khadr, describing it as “outrageous” in a letter. He called for Canadian prime minister Justin Trudeau to be charged with treason, accusing him of being a "groupie" and "supporter" of Omar Khadr. He asserted that "it was wrong" for the Canadian government to settle Khadr's lawsuit, and that it should have been taken to court instead.
