= Jim Gould =

Canadian intelligence officer

Jim Gould was an intelligence officer who served as a deputy at the Canadian Department of Foreign Affairs and International Trade.

== Omar Khadr ==
In February 2003, Gould and an official from the Canadian Security Intelligence Service (CSIS) were allowed to interrogate American-held Canadian teenager Omar Khadr. The presence of Gould, who brought Khadr a Big Mac value meal, allowed the government to claim that the purpose of the visit was "to ascertain Khadr's well-being." Khadr's attorney Nate Whitling argued, "Foreign Affairs is suggesting that the visit was actually for [Khadr's] benefit, but this is not the case". Khadr's attorneys sought a Federal Court injunction to prevent CSIS from interrogating him in the future. The following month, a briefing from the Foreign Affairs department summarized Gould's findings, stating that Khadr was a "thoroughly 'screwed up' young man. All those persons who have been in positions of authority over him have abused him and his trust, for their own purposes."

The November 14, 2003 report from the Canadian interrogation states that:

"In a fit of anger, [Khadr] tore off his shirt revealing extensive scarring on the upper torso and a cluster of smaller ones on the upper left side of his body and on the back of his left shoulder."

Assistant Director of CSIS William Hooper assured the Canadian public this interrogation was not intended to secure intelligence for an American prosecution. Hooper then admitted the information was all freely shared with his American captors without securing any guarantees, such as a promise not to seek the death penalty.

== Death and legacy ==
Jim Gould died in 2016. A memorial article published late that year in bout de papier (Canada's Magazine of Diplomacy and Foreign Service) included the following:

"Jim's career spanned a time of great upheavals in the parts of the world with which he was concerned. Most of his career events cannot be discussed because of security considerations, but one event which had a deep impact on him was the case of Omar Khadr. A person who was close to the case described Jim's contributions as "an example of the best of the Canadian foreign service." Had Jim lived a little longer, he would have been proud of the Emmy nomination for Michelle Shephard and the documentary, Guantanamo's Child."
