= Bowden, Alberta =

Bowden
- Town
- Town of Bowden
- Location of Bowden in Alberta
- Coordinates: 51°55′50″N 114°01′32″W
- Country: Canada
- Province: Alberta
- Region: Central Alberta
- Census division: 8
- Municipal district: Red Deer County
- Incorporated
  - Village: June 17, 1904
  - Town: September 1, 1981

Government
  - Mayor: Robb Stuart
  - Governing body: Bowden Town Council
  - CAO: Rudy Friesen
  - MP: Blaine Calkins
  - MLA: Devin Dreeshen

Area (2021)
  - Land: 3.46 km^{2} (1.34 sq mi)
- Elevation: 991 m (3,251 ft)

Population (2021)
  - Total: 1,280
  - Density: 370.2/km^{2} (959/sq mi)
- Time zone: UTC−06:00 (Alberta Time)
- Postal code span: T4E
- Area code: +1-403
- Website: Official website

Bowden /ˈboʊdən/ is a town in central Alberta, Canada. It is located in Red Deer County on the Queen Elizabeth II Highway, approximately 45 km (28 mi) south of Red Deer.

The community may take its name from Bowdon, Greater Manchester, in England. A provincial Alberta Land Surveyor reference relates this alternate name source, "The most widely accepted version says that a surveyor named Williamson suggested that this siding on the Edmonton-Calgary Trail take the maiden name of his wife."

== History ==
During World War II an area of land 4 kilometres north of the town was appropriated by the Royal Canadian Air Force for construction of an Air Training Base. RCAF Station Bowden was home to No. 32 Elementary Flying Train School (EFTS).

After the war the site was converted to the Bowden Institution, originally as a provincial facility. In 1974 it was converted to a Correctional Service Canada medium security penitentiary.

The town describes itself as a bedroom community, meaning a large proportion of the working population commutes to other employment centres, including Red Deer and Calgary.

== Geography ==
Nearby communities include Innisfail to the north, Caroline to the west, Huxley to the east and Olds to the south.

=== Climate ===
Climate data for Bowden
Month	Jan	Feb	Mar	Apr	May	Jun	Jul	Aug	Sep	Oct	Nov	Dec	Year
Record high °C (°F)	12.8 (55.0)	14.4 (57.9)	19.4 (66.9)	28.9 (84.0)	30.6 (87.1)	33.3 (91.9)	34.4 (93.9)	32.8 (91.0)	34.4 (93.9)	29.0 (84.2)	22.2 (72.0)	13.9 (57.0)	34.4 (93.9)
Mean daily maximum °C (°F)	−8 (18)	−2.9 (26.8)	1.2 (34.2)	9.6 (49.3)	16.5 (61.7)	20.0 (68.0)	22.6 (72.7)	22.1 (71.8)	16.7 (62.1)	11.9 (53.4)	1.3 (34.3)	−6 (21)	8.7 (47.7)
Daily mean °C (°F)	−13.6 (7.5)	−8.6 (16.5)	−4.4 (24.1)	3.4 (38.1)	9.6 (49.3)	13.6 (56.5)	15.7 (60.3)	15.0 (59.0)	9.9 (49.8)	4.9 (40.8)	−4.3 (24.3)	−11.6 (11.1)	2.5 (36.5)
Mean daily minimum °C (°F)	−19.4 (−2.9)	−14.5 (5.9)	−10 (14)	−2.9 (26.8)	2.6 (36.7)	7.1 (44.8)	8.9 (48.0)	7.8 (46.0)	3.2 (37.8)	−2.1 (28.2)	−10 (14)	−17.2 (1.0)	−3.9 (25.0)
Record low °C (°F)	−45.6 (−50.1)	−42 (−44)	−39.4 (−38.9)	−22.8 (−9.0)	−12.8 (9.0)	−2.8 (27.0)	1.1 (34.0)	−1.1 (30.0)	−8.3 (17.1)	−24.5 (−12.1)	−33.3 (−27.9)	−44.4 (−47.9)	−45.6 (−50.1)
Average precipitation mm (inches)	27.3 (1.07)	19.2 (0.76)	20.6 (0.81)	25.4 (1.00)	58.5 (2.30)	89.1 (3.51)	90.1 (3.55)	59.5 (2.34)	53.9 (2.12)	22.3 (0.88)	18.5 (0.73)	27.5 (1.08)	511.7 (20.15)
Average rainfall mm (inches)	1.0 (0.04)	0.3 (0.01)	1.7 (0.07)	10.4 (0.41)	55.0 (2.17)	89.0 (3.50)	90.1 (3.55)	59.5 (2.34)	50.3 (1.98)	12.0 (0.47)	1.3 (0.05)	0.0 (0.0)	370.6 (14.59)
Average snowfall cm (inches)	26.3 (10.4)	18.9 (7.4)	18.9 (7.4)	15.0 (5.9)	3.5 (1.4)	0.1 (0.0)	0.0 (0.0)	0.0 (0.0)	3.5 (1.4)	10.3 (4.1)	17.2 (6.8)	27.5 (10.8)	141.0 (55.5)
Source: Environment Canada

== Demographics ==
In the 2021 Census of Population conducted by Statistics Canada, the Town of Bowden had a population of 1,280 living in 584 of its 622 total private dwellings, a change of 3.2% from its 2016 population of 1,240. With a land area of 3.46 km^{2} (1.34 sq mi), it had a population density of 369.9/km^{2} (958.1/sq mi) in 2021.

In the 2016 Census of Population conducted by Statistics Canada, the Town of Bowden recorded a population of 1,240 living in 524 of its 581 total private dwellings, a −0.1% change from its 2011 population of 1,241. With a land area of 2.8 km^{2} (1.1 sq mi), it had a population density of 442.9/km^{2} (1,147.0/sq mi) in 2016.

== Attractions ==
Bowden has a nine-hole golf course with a licensed clubhouse. The Paterson Community Centre and the Friendship Centre provide venues for family and community functions. The Pioneer Museum offers an insight into past community life and the past history of the Town. The pioneer museum features photographs by the local photographer Bob Hoare, who documented local residents around the turn of the twentieth century.

== Notable people ==
- Neil MacGonigill, music manager and producer, was raised in Bowden.

== See also ==
- List of communities in Alberta
- List of towns in Alberta
