= Muneer Ahmad =

Professor of law

Muneer Ahmad is a professor of law at the Yale Law School. He is a specialist in international human rights and immigration law.

He is known for his work as co-counsel for Omar Khadr, a Canadian who was detained at the Guantanamo Bay detainment camp.

Khadr subsequently dismissed Ahmad, after winning a legal fight to not be represented by Americans.

== Education ==
He received his B.A. and J.D. degrees from Harvard University.
