= Robert Chester (lawyer) =

American military officer and lawyer

Robert Chester is an American military officer and lawyer. Chester is a colonel in the United States Marine Corps.

Chester was appointed to serve as President of the Guantanamo military commission faced by Omar Khadr.

On January 12, 2006, he admonished Khadr's prosecutor, Colonel Morris Davis, to show more respect to Khadr. He instructed him to start referring to Khadr as "Mr Khadr".
