= William C. Kuebler =

American lawyer

- Died: 2015 (aged 43–44)
- Occupation: lawyer

William "Bill" C. Kuebler (d. July 17, 2015) was an American lawyer and a Commander in the United States Navy Judge Advocate General's Corps, assigned to the U.S. Navy Office of the Judge Advocate General, International and Operational Law Division. Kuebler was previously assigned to the Office of Military Commissions. Prior to the decision of the United States Supreme Court in Hamdan v. Rumsfeld, to overturn the then current version of the Guantanamo military commissions on constitutional grounds, Kuebler was detailed to defend Ghassan Abdullah al Sharbi. Al Sharbi had insisted on representing himself and Kuebler refused superior orders to act as his lawyer.

On June 4, 2007, Kuebler was the detailed counsel for Canadian youth Omar Khadr, Kuebler declined to join in the discussion as to whether charges against Khadr should be dropped, on jurisdictional grounds, because he had not had a chance to meet with Khadr, and didn't feel comfortable representing him without his consent. Peter Brownback, the officer presiding over Khadr's commission, did dismiss all charges, because the Military Commissions Act only authorized the commissions to act against "unlawful enemy combatants", and Khadr's Combatant Status Review Tribunal, like those of all the other Guantanamo captives, had only confirmed that he met the Bush Presidency's definition of an "enemy combatant".

On 11 August 2007, Kuebler spoke to the Council of the Canadian Bar Association at its annual meeting being held in Calgary, Alberta, urging the Bar Association to use its position to pressure publicly the Canadian government to repatriate Khadr. By the next day, the President of the Canadian Bar Association announced that, given the overwhelmingly positive reception that Council had given to Kuebler's speech, the Association was writing to the Canadian Prime Minister to urge immediate action. The announcement received prominent coverage in the Canadian print and television media.

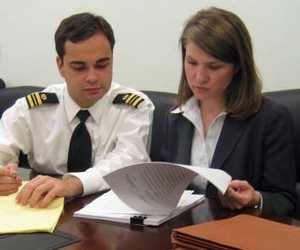
Kuebler with Rebecca S. Snyder.

Canadian attorney Dennis Edney was barred from appearing at the October arraignment after an early dispute over comments Kuebler had made to the Canadian press critical of Khadr's father. Kuebler continues, however, to work closely with Edney and Nathan Whitling in legal proceedings in both Canada and the United States. All three appeared at a hearing in February 2008, along with U.S. assistant counsel Rebecca Snyder, where Kuebler moved to dismiss Khadr's case before the military commission because Congress did not intend for child soldiers to be prosecuted before military commission. Kuebler argued to the military judge that a child soldier, such as Khadr, was a "victim of Al Qaeda, not a member." In an interview with the Wall Street Journal, U.S. Senator Lindsey Graham, author of the Military Commissions Act seemed to agree. When asked about Khadr's case, Graham said, "I'm not comfortable on an issue like this with minors."

In February 2009, Kuebler was chosen as the recipient of the Reg Robson Civil Liberties Award for protecting civil liberties and human rights. The award is given out annually by the British Columbia Civil Liberties Association, the oldest and most active civil liberties organization in Canada whose mandate is similar to the American Civil Liberties Union. Kuebler is the first non-Canadian to receive the award.

On Thursday, April 2, 2009, Kuebler addressed the Lord Reading Law Society in Montreal and mentioned that "up till now" he had not faced serious pressures from within the military concerning his work. On April 4, 2009, the Canwest News Service (Canada) carried a report that Kuebler "has been fired from the (Khadr) case after accusing his boss of a conflict of interest". Col. Peter Masciola is mentioned as giving Kuebler "his marching orders." Masciola promoted Commander Walter Ruiz to replace Kuebler. On April 7, 2009, the Presiding Officer of Khadr's case, overruled Masciola, asserting that only the Presiding Officer, or the suspect, had the authority to fire attorneys.

Steven Edwards, writing in the Ottawa Citizen, reported that Kuebler had, coincidentally, been called into Masciola's office when Masciola received the phone call that informed him that Colonel Patrick Parrish had overruled him. Citing an unnamed source the Citizen reported that Masciola was "not at all pleased" to learn Parrish wanted to overrule him. Masciola did not accept Parrish's ruling, and continued to decline to allow Kuebler to meet with Khadr, to access the case file. According to the unnamed source:

When the ruling came down, Col. Masciola said that he thought the judge was wrong and ordered Lt.-Cmdr. Kuebler to leave the office. Lt.-Cmdr. Kuebler asked to use the phone and he was told that he was not a member of the office and could not use any office equipment.

In late May Parrish scheduled a hearing for June 1, 2009, to consider whether Kuebler should remain as Khadr's counsel. In August 2009 Kuebler detached from the Office of Military Commissions to attend graduate school at the George Washington University Law School. In October 2009 Khadr released Kuebler as his counsel.

== Death, July 17, 2015 ==
When Kuebler died on July 17, 2015, at age 44, his death spurred concerns that his cancer had been triggered by his work at Guantanamo. Canadian journalist Steven Edwards, a cancer survivor, reported that Kuebler had phoned him, in December 2014, and informed him he had "joined the club"—meaning he too had acquired cancer. David Rodhe, reporting for Reuters, reported that Kuebler was the seventh individual at Guantanamo Bay to die of cancer during the last two years.
