= Patrick Parrish =

United States Army officer on the Guantanamo Military Commission

- Military career
- Branch: United States Army
- Rank: Colonel

Patrick Parrish is an officer in the United States Army.

== Military career ==
=== Case of William J. Kreutzer Jr ===
Colonel Parrish presided over the case of Sergeant William J. Kreutzer Jr. Kreutzer had been convicted of murder for a 1995 shooting.

=== Case of Alberto Martinez ===
Colonel Parrish presided over the case of Staff Sergeant Alberto Martinez, a GI who was accused of murdering two officers with a grenade.

=== Guantanamo assignment ===
On May 29, 2008 Colonel Peter Brownback, the Presiding Officer over Omar Khadr's Guantanamo military commission was removed, and Parrish was appointed to take his place. Brownback's replacement was described as "surprising".

Lieutenant Commander William Keubler, one of Khadr's Defense attorneys, speculated that Brownback's unexpected replacement was due to his insistence that the Prosecution complete the process of discovery, before he set a trial date.

On Thursday September 4, 2008 Parrish barred the 2nd in command at the Office of Military Commissions, Brigadier General Thomas W. Hartmann, from participating in Khadr's Tribunal because of his "undue command influence". Khadr's Tribunal is the third that Hartmann has been barred from participating in.

=== Parrish's Guantanamo hitch, under the Obama administration ===
President Barack Obama issued executive orders following his inauguration. He ordered the Guantanamo commissions to be suspended, while his own team could assess whether they should be preserved, modified, or closed. James Pohl, another Presiding Officer, took the position that the President didn't have the authority to order him to suspend the commissions. But Parrish complied.

A dispute arose between Khadr's lead Defense Counsel, William Keubler, and Peter Masciola, the new Chief Defense Counsel. He told Keubler he was fired, because he was not obeying orders. He locked him out of his office, and stopped his access to Khadr, and to the case file. Keubler said the dispute arose because Masciola wanted to continue to play a role in modified commissions, moved to the continental United States, while Keubler wanted to see the charges against Khadr dropped, and see him repatriated to a kind of parole—rehabilitation program in Canada.

Parrish ruled that the rules of the Guantanamo commission system did not give Masciola the authority to fire Keubler. He ruled that only a Presiding Officer could order a defense counsel's replacement. In late May Parrish scheduled a hearing for June 1, 2009—even though Obama's suspension was still in effect, to consider the issue of whether Keubler should be allowed to continue to represent Khadr.
