= Death of Nagem Hatab =

2003 death of an Iraqi prisoner in US custody

Nagem Hatab was an Iraqi who died on June 3, 2003, while in US custody. Hatab is said to have been a Ba'ath party member.

== Arrest ==
Hatab was arrested in a raja bazaar where he was trying to sell a U.S. Army issue M16 rifle. The serial number of this rifle showed it was one issued to a member of the unit that included captured Army Private Jessica Lynch. United States Marines who were guarding the prisoners at Camp Whitehorse believed that his possession of the rifle implicated Hatab in Lynch's capture.

== Death in custody ==
Hatab was in custody for only a few days. Hatab was interrogated by a military intelligence officer before he was killed. He was also looked at by a medic who stated that Hatab appeared to have suffered a mild heart attack. The medic also suggested Hatab might be faking it. In the days before he died Hatab was observed being unsteady on his feet. He was observed spontaneously falling over and landing on a bale of razor wire. He appeared dazed. He had completely lost control of his bowels, and his clothes were covered in excrement.

Major Clarke Paulus ordered Corporal Christian Hernandez to haul Hatab over to where he could be hosed off. He was then to strip Hatab naked, burn his clothes, and tie him to a stake, and leave him outside, so he wouldn't foul the clothes of other prisoners. Hatab was left naked out in the desert, limp and incapacitated in the blazing sun. At midnight it was noticed Hatab was dead.

== Investigations ==
A post-mortem was conducted on Hatab. It determined that he died from a broken hyoid bone, a very small bone, near the larynx. Hernandez had been ordered to haul Hatab by his neck, when he dragged him to where he could be hosed off. General James Mattis dropped all charges against Hernandez.

Initially eight Marines were under investigation for their roles in Hatab's death. But Pittman and Paulus were the only two to be court martialed. The post-mortem had found a large bruise that was probably caused by Pittman's kick. Pittman was cleared of assault, but was convicted of dereliction of duty and abuse of prisoners. He was reduced of rank to private and was sentenced to 60 days of hard labor.

Samples of Hatab's bodily fluids were packed in ice to be sent to Germany for analysis, as part of the autopsy. However, the container was left on the tarmac at Tallil Air Base in Iraq and exploded in the hot sun.
