= Christopher Speer =

US Army soldier (1973–2002)

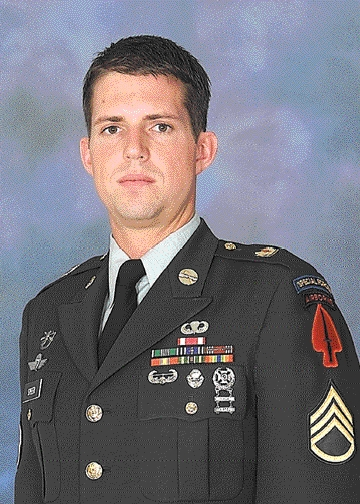
- Speer as a staff sergeant
- Born: September 9, 1973; Denver, Colorado, United States
- Died: August 6, 2002 (aged 28); Ramstein Air Base, Germany
- Burial place: Pinehurst, North Carolina, United States
- Relatives: Todd Speer (brother); Tabitha Speer (widow); Taryn and Tanner Speer (children)
- Military career
- Allegiance: United States
- Branch: United States Army
- Service years: 1992–2002
- Rank: Sergeant First Class
- Units: 3rd Special Forces Group; 1st SFOD-D (Delta Force)
- Conflicts: War in Afghanistan
- Awards: Soldier's Medal; Bronze Star Medal; Purple Heart

Christopher James Speer (September 9, 1973 – August 6, 2002) was a United States Army combat medic and an armed member of a special operations team who was killed during a skirmish in Afghanistan on July 27, 2002. Speer, who was not wearing a helmet at the time because the mission called for indigenous clothing, suffered a head wound from a grenade and succumbed to his injuries approximately two weeks later. Omar Khadr was charged and convicted of throwing the grenade that killed Speer.

== Training and deployment ==
Speer enlisted in the United States Army in July 1992 and after initial training as a combat medic, was assigned to the Army Hospital at Carlisle Barracks, Pennsylvania, until 1994. He received 18 Delta combat medic training at the Joint Special Operations University at Hurlburt Field, Florida.

Speer was assigned to the 3rd Special Forces Group upon completing training as a Special Forces medic in 1997. As part of the 1st SFOD-D (known as Delta Force and based at Fort Bragg, North Carolina), he deployed to Afghanistan in Spring 2002 as part of Operation Enduring Freedom.

== Death ==
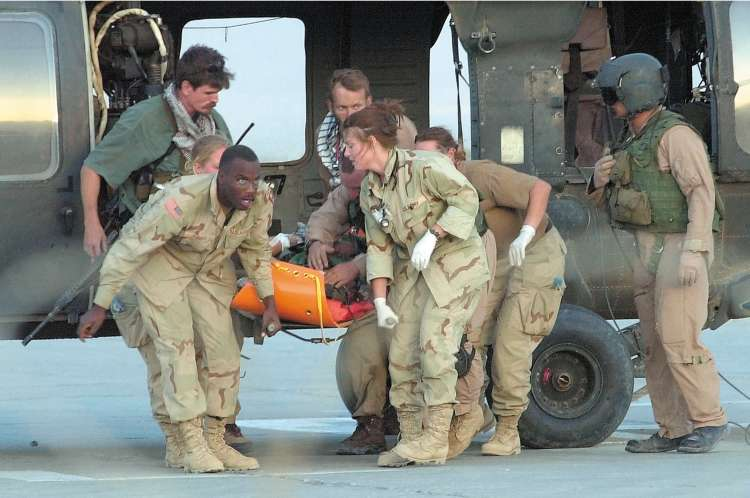
Speer at Bagram being unloaded by the 396th Medical.

On July 27, 2002, Christopher Speer and a group of four other soldiers on reconnaissance patrol were injured during a firefight upon attacking a building in Khost Province, Afghanistan. SFC Christopher Speer was part of a squad assigned the task of going through the ruins of the building after it had been destroyed.

The injured Speer was evacuated by air to Bagram Air Force Base and then to Ramstein Air Base in Germany, where he died on August 6, 2002.

The incident received widespread attention as fifteen-year-old Toronto-born Omar Khadr, a Canadian citizen with Egyptian and Palestinian ancestry, was captured and subsequently imprisoned in Guantanamo Bay, accused of killing Speer. Khadr was held without trial for 8 years. In October 2010, he pleaded guilty to, among other crimes, "murder in violation of the laws of war" for the killing of Speer. At that time, he said he had thrown the hand grenade which killed Speer in the firefight.

The charges against Khadr were filed under the Military Commission Act of 2006 and considered under US law to be war crimes, though the act passed into law several years after Speer's death. In 2013, Khadr filed a civil suit against the government of Canada, alleging that the government had breached his Charter rights. In the lawsuit, he claimed he had only signed the plea agreement because he believed it was the only way he could gain transfer from Guantanamo. In an affidavit filed in the proceedings, he said he had no memory of the firefight.

Prior to his plea of guilty to Speer's death, Khadr became the focus of several legal disputes. On February 4, 2008, American officials accidentally released an unredacted version of testimony which—according to Khadr's lawyers—showed that Khadr was not responsible for Speer's death. In January 2006 Colonel Morris Davis, Khadr's prosecutor, in statements to the press, said that Khadr owed his life to American medics who stepped over the dead body of their colleague to treat Khadr's wounds. Speer died from his wounds on August 6, 2002, at the age of 28.

=== Aftermath ===
On the second anniversary of Speer's death, SFC Speer's widow Tabitha and a comrade of his, Layne Morris, initiated legal proceedings to claim compensation from the estate of Omar Khadr's father Ahmed Khadr.

On October 25, 2010, Khadr pleaded guilty to and was convicted of the murder of Speer in violation of the laws of war, attempted murder in violation of the laws of war, conspiracy, two counts of providing material support for terrorism and spying in the United States.

On October 29, 2010, after taking the stand, Khadr apologized to the widow of Speer stating "I'm really sorry for the pain I caused to your family. I wish I could do something to take that pain away.", and further stating that his eight years in prison had taught him "the beauty of life".

== Legacy ==
Speer was awarded the Soldier's Medal for risking his life to save two Afghan children who were trapped in a minefield on July 21, 2002, two weeks before his death.

The infirmary at a special forces base in Kunar Province was named the "Christopher J. Speer Medical Clinic" in his memory.

== Awards and decorations ==
Speer's awards include:

Personal decorations
Soldier's Medal
Bronze Star Medal with "V" device
Purple Heart
Defense Meritorious Service Medal
Meritorious Service Medal
Army Commendation Medal
Army Achievement Medal with 1 oak leaf cluster
Army Good Conduct Medal
Armed Forces Expeditionary Medal
Afghanistan Campaign Medal with 1 Campaign star
Global War on Terrorism Expeditionary Medal
Global War on Terrorism Service Medal
National Defense Service Medal
NCO Professional Development Ribbon with award numeral 2
Army Service Ribbon

Other accoutrements
Combat Medical Badge
Parachutist Badge
Air Assault Badge
Military Free Fall Jumpmaster Badge
Scuba Diver Badge
Silver German Parachutist Badge
Expert Marksmanship Badge with Rifle and Pistol Component Bar
U.S Army Special Forces Distinctive unit insignia
Special Forces Tab
United States Army Special Operations Command Combat Service Identification Badge
