= Ayub Kheyl =

Village in Khost Province, Afghanistan

Coordinates: 33°38′6″N 69°42′39″E

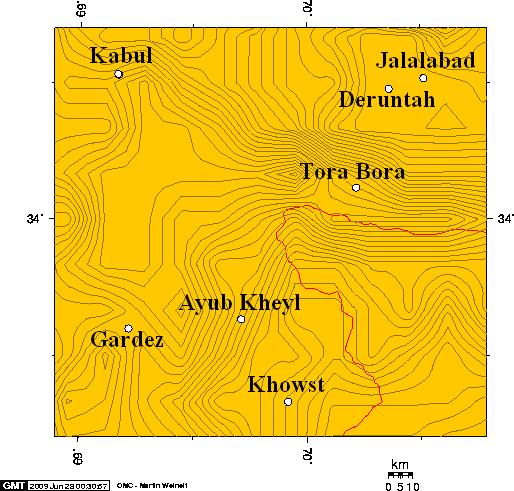
Ayub Kheyl, and cities in Eastern Afghanistan.

Ayub Kheyl (Pashto: أيوب خيل) is a small village 11 km (7 miles) outside Khost, Afghanistan. It was the site on July 27, 2002, of a firefight by US soldiers, assisted by Afghan militia, against militants in the village. After the fight, the Americans captured the wounded 15-year-old Omar Khadr, who they learned was a Canadian citizen. He was among the youngest persons detained at Guantanamo Bay detention camp and the last Western citizen held there.

The village was known among the Afghans for its Pashtun residents, who were conservative and considered closely tied to the Taliban.

== See also ==
- Khost Province
