= Omar Khadr =

Canadian child soldier (born 1986)

Omar Khadr عمر خضر
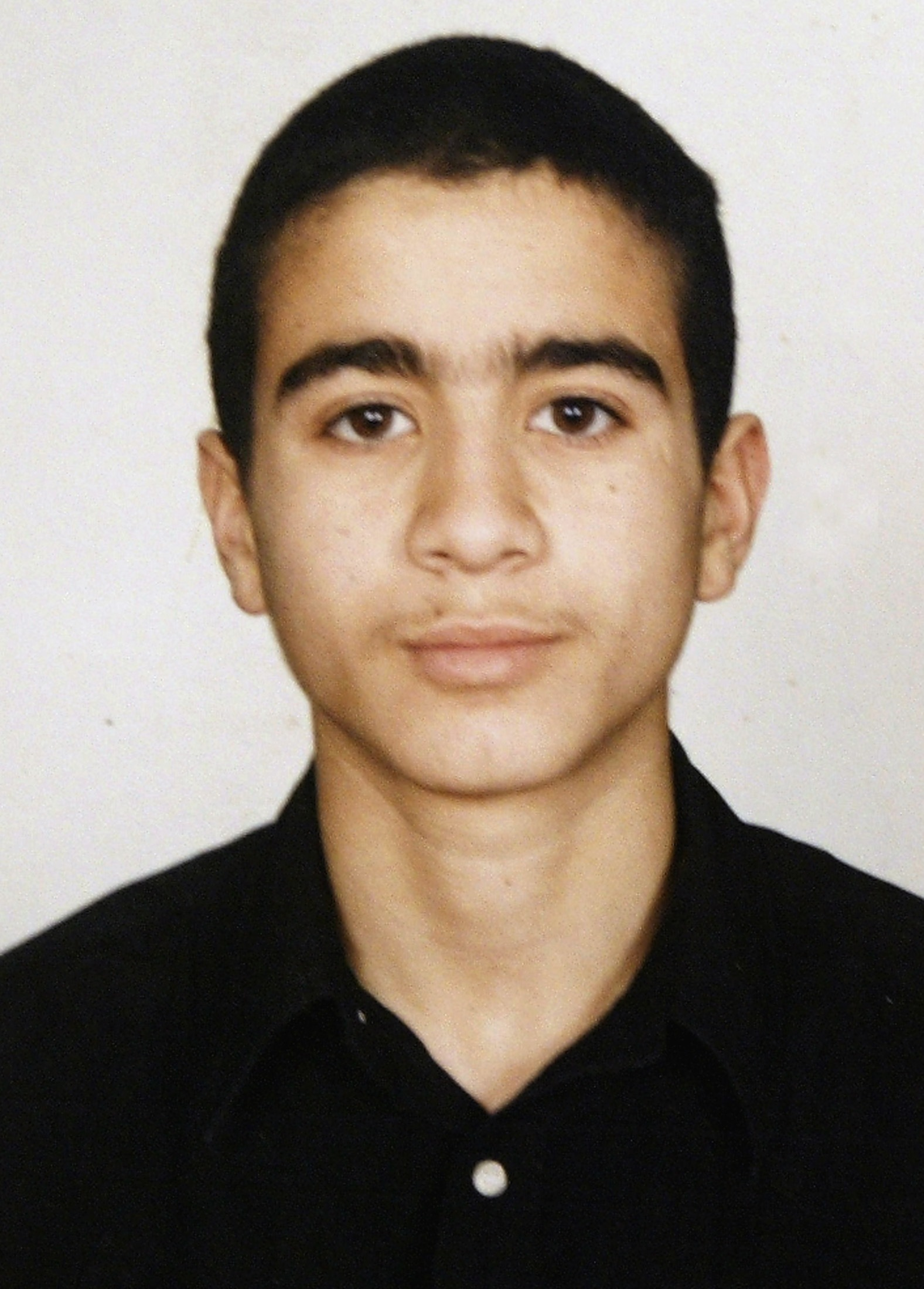
- Khadr at the age of 14
- Born: Omar Ahmed Said Khadr; September 19, 1986 (age 40); Toronto, Ontario, Canada
- Detained at: Bagram Air Base, (July 27, 2002 – October 29, 2002); Guantanamo Bay (October 29, 2002 – September 28, 2012); Millhaven Institution (September 28, 2012 – May 28, 2013); Edmonton Institution (May 28, 2013 – February 11, 2014); Bowden Institution (February 11, 2014 – May 7, 2015)
- Charges: Five charges of war crimes under the Military Commissions Act of 2006, including "murder in violation of the laws of war"
- Penalty: Eight additional years confinement (no credit for eight years already served; parole eligibility in mid-2013)
- Status: Pleaded guilty on October 25, 2010 (later retracted); released on bail May 7, 2015; completed conditions March 25, 2019
- Parents: Ahmed Khadr; Maha el-Samnah

Omar Ahmed Said Khadr (Arabic: عمر أحمد سعيد خضر, romanized: ʻUmar Aḥmad Saʻīd Khiḍr; born September 19, 1986) is a Canadian who, at the age of 15, was detained by the United States at Guantanamo Bay for ten years, during which he pleaded guilty to the murder of U.S. Army Sergeant 1st Class Christopher Speer and other charges. He later appealed his conviction, claiming that he falsely pleaded guilty so that he could return to Canada where he remained in custody for three additional years. Khadr sued the Canadian government for infringing his rights under the Canadian Charter of Rights and Freedoms, where his lawsuit was settled in 2017 with a CA$10.5 million payment and an apology from the federal government.

Khadr was born in Canada in 1986, and was taken to Afghanistan by his father, who was allegedly affiliated with Al-Qaeda and other terrorist organizations. On July 27, 2002, at age 15, Khadr was critically wounded during fighting between U.S. soldiers and Taliban fighters in the village of Ayub Kheyl; Khadr is alleged to have thrown the grenade that killed Speer. After he was captured and detained at the Bagram Airfield, he was sent to the Guantanamo Bay detention camps in Cuba. During his detention, Khadr was interrogated by both Canadian and US intelligence officers.

After eight years in detention, Khadr pleaded guilty in October 2010 to "murder in violation of the laws of war" and four other charges at a hearing before a United States military commission. The charges were filed under the US Military Commission Act of 2006 and considered under US law to be war crimes, although the act was not in place at the time the alleged offenses took place. Khadr agreed to an eight-year sentence with no credit for eight years already served and the possibility of a transfer to Canada after a minimum of one year and parole eligibility after three years.

According to the UN, Khadr was the first person since World War II to be prosecuted in a military commission for war crimes committed while still a minor. His conviction and sentence were denounced by some civil rights groups and the United Nations Special Representative for Children and Armed Conflict.

Meanwhile, early in 2010, the Supreme Court of Canada had ruled that the Canadian government's interrogation of Khadr at Guantanamo Bay "offend[ed] the most basic Canadian standards [of] the treatment of detained youth suspects", but stopped short of ordering Khadr's repatriation. However, on September 29, 2012, Khadr returned to Canada to serve the remainder of his sentence in Canadian custody.

Khadr was released on bail in May 2015 (pending an appeal of his U.S. conviction) after the Alberta Court of Appeal refused to block his release as had been requested by the Canadian government. In 2017, the Canadian government announced a CA$10.5 million settlement with Khadr to compensate for damages arising from its previous handling of the case. Tabitha Speer, Christopher Speer's widow, filed an application to enforce a US$134 million Utah default civil judgment in Canada. On March 25, 2019, the Alberta Court of Queen's Bench ruled that Khadr's time on conditional release counted towards his sentence, which was declared completed.

== Early life ==
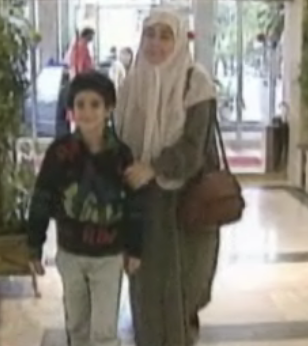
Khadr and his mother

Khadr was born in Toronto on September 19, 1986, to Ahmed Khadr and Maha el-Samnah, who were Egyptian and Palestinian immigrants who became Canadian citizens. The Khadr family had moved to Peshawar, Pakistan, in 1985, where his father worked for charities helping Afghan refugees.

He spent his childhood moving back and forth between Canada and Pakistan. He had six siblings and his mother wanted to raise their family outside of Canada, as she disliked some of its Western social influences.

In 1992, Khadr's father was severely injured while in Logar, Afghanistan. Following the injury, the family moved to Toronto so he could recover. Omar enrolled at ISNA Elementary School for Grade 1.

In 1995, after the family's return to Pakistan, Omar's father, was arrested and accused of financially aiding the Egyptian Islamic Jihad in the bombing of the Egyptian embassy in Pakistan. During his imprisonment, Ahmed was hospitalised following a hunger strike, before being released a year later due to lack of evidence. In 1996, Ahmed Khadr moved his family to Jalalabad, Afghanistan, where he worked for an NGO.

Following the September 11, 2001 attacks in the United States, Omar's mother and his siblings feared U.S. bombing of Afghanistan, and retreated toward the Pakistani mountains, where the father visited infrequently.

In early 2002, Khadr was living in Waziristan with his mother and younger sister. At one point, he was forced to wear a burqa and disguise himself as a girl to avoid scrutiny, an act that upset him. When his father returned, Omar asked to be allowed to stay at a group home for young men, despite his mother's protests. His father agreed, and a month later allowed Omar to accompany a group of Arabs associated with Abu Laith al-Libi who needed a Pashto translator during their stay in Khost.

According to the April 2007 charges from the military commission, Khadr received "one-on-one" weapons training in June 2002, and his visits to his mother and sister became less frequent.

== Firefight and capture ==
Starting in February 2002, American soldiers used an abandoned Soviet airbase in Khost, Afghanistan, as an intelligence-gathering outpost, with the goal of gaining the trust of the local community.

In the early morning of July 27, 2002, a team made up of the 19th Special Forces Group, the 505th Infantry Regiment and about twenty Afghan fighters associated with Pacha Khan Zadran, were sent to a house on a reconnaissance mission.

While at the house, a report came in that a monitored satellite phone had recently been used within 300–600 metres of the unit's location, and seven soldiers were sent to investigate the origin of the call.

Led by Major Randy Watt, the group included XO Captain Mike Silver, Sgt. Christopher Speer, Layne Morris and Master Sgt. Scotty Hansen, the last three from the 19th Special Forces Group; Spc. Christopher J. Vedvick from the 505th, and his fire team.

The men arrived at a residential complex with earthen huts and a granary, surrounded by a stone wall with a metal gate approximately 100 metres from the main hut.

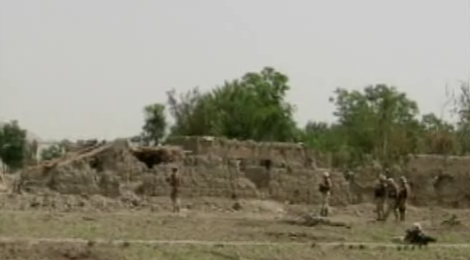
American soldiers standing outside the compound

Seeing five men described as "well-dressed" in the main residence with AK-47s nearby, there is dispute whether the Americans approached and told the occupants to open the front door or set up a perimeter around the complex. In the end, the team waited approximately 45 minutes for support to arrive.

By that time a crowd of about 100 local Afghans had gathered around the area to observe the operation. An Afghan militiaman was sent toward the house to demand the surrender of the occupants, but retreated under gunfire.

Reinforcements from the 3rd Platoon of Bravo Company, 1st Battalion 505th Infantry Regiment arrived under the command of Captain Christopher W. Cirino, bringing the total number of soldiers to about fifty. Two more Afghans were sent to speak with the residents, and they returned and reported that the men claimed to be Pashtun villagers. The Americans told them to return and say the Americans wanted to search their house regardless of their affiliation. When the militiamen shared this information, the occupants of the hut opened fire, shooting both messengers. At least one woman and a child fled the huts, while the remaining occupants began throwing grenades at the American and Afghan troops, paired with intermittent rifle fire.

Morris and Silver took up positions outside the stone wall. Morris received a cut above his right eye and had shrapnel embedded in his nose. At first, Morris and Silver thought the wound was due to Morris's rifle malfunctioning, but it was later attributed to a grenade. Morris was then dragged a safe distance from the combat, and was shortly after joined by Spc. Michael Rewakowski, Pfc. Brian Worth and Spc. Christopher J. Vedvick, who had also been wounded by grenades.

At 09:10 UTC, the Americans sent a request for MedEvac to the 57th Medical Detachment. Ten minutes later, a pair of UH-60 Blackhawk helicopters were deployed, with AH-64 Apache helicopters as an escort. Arriving at the scene, the Apaches strafed the compound with cannon and rocket fire, while the medical helicopters remained 12 miles (19 km) from the ongoing firefight. The helicopters landed at 10:28 UTC to load the wounded aboard. Afterwards a pair of A-10 Warthog aircraft dropped multiple 500 lb bombs on the compound.

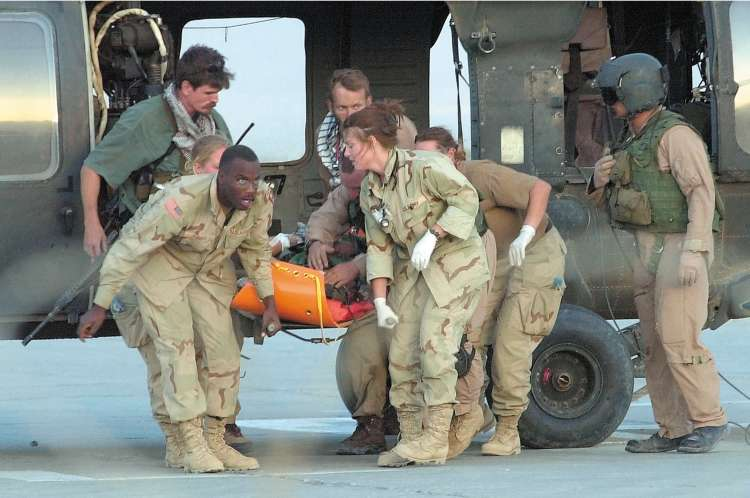
Speer being unloaded at Bagram

At this point, a five-vehicle convoy of American reinforcements arrived, bringing the number of troops to approximately 100. Two of these vehicles were destroyed by the militants. Ten minutes later, the MedEvac left for Bagram Airbase and reached Bagram Airfield at 11:30.

Unaware that Khadr and one other militant had survived the bombing, the ground forces sent a team consisting of OC-1, Silver, Speer and three Delta Force soldiers through a hole in the south side of the compound's wall.

The team found the bodies of dead animals and three fighters. According to Silver's 2007 telling of the event, he heard a sound "like a gunshot" and saw the three Delta Force soldiers duck. A grenade went by the men and exploded near the rear of the group, injuring Speer, who was "wearing Afghan garb and helmetless."

OC-1 reported that although he didn't hear any gunfire, the dust from the north side of the complex led him to believe the team was under fire from a shooter between the house and barn. He reported that a grenade was lobbed over the wall that led to the alley and landed 30–50 metres from the alley's opening. Running towards the alley to avoid the blast, OC-1 fired a dozen M4 Carbine rounds into the alley as he ran past, although there was no visibility due to clouds of dust. Crouching at the southeast entrance to the alleyway, OC-1 could see a man with a holstered pistol and two chest wounds moving on the ground next to an AK-47. From his position OC-1 fired a single shot into the man's head, killing him. When the dust cleared, OC-1 saw Khadr crouched, facing away from the action and shot Khadr twice in the back.

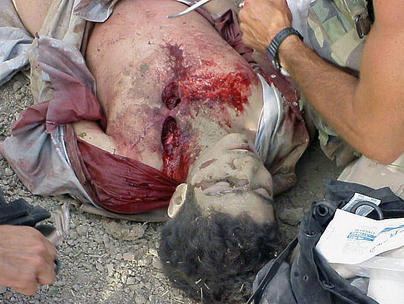
Two soldiers kneel over the wounded Khadr.

OC-1 estimated that all the events since entering the wall had taken less than a minute to unfold, and that he had been the only American to fire his weapon. Silver initially claimed that two Delta Force troops had opened fire, shooting all three of the shots into Khadr's chest, after Khadr was seen to be holding a pistol and facing the troops.

These claims seem to contradict OC-1's version of events. OC-1 did agree however, that something was lying in the dust near Khadr, although he could not recall if it was a pistol or grenade.

Entering the alleyway, OC-1 saw two dead militants under rubble and believed they had been killed by the airstrikes. He then confirmed that the man he had shot was dead. Moving back to Khadr, OC-1 found that he was alive. Turning Khadr over onto his back, OC-1 left the alley to find Speer, whose injuries OC-1 was then unaware of. While leaving the alleyway, OC-1 saw a third AK-47 and several grenades.

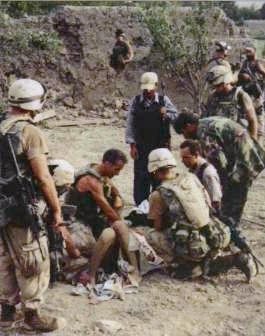
Khadr being treated by medics

Khadr was given on-site medical attention, during which time he repeatedly asked the medics to kill him. Delta Force soldiers ordered them not to harm the prisoner. Khadr was loaded aboard a CH-47 helicopter and flown to Bagram Airbase in Afghanistan, losing consciousness during the flight.

=== Aftermath ===
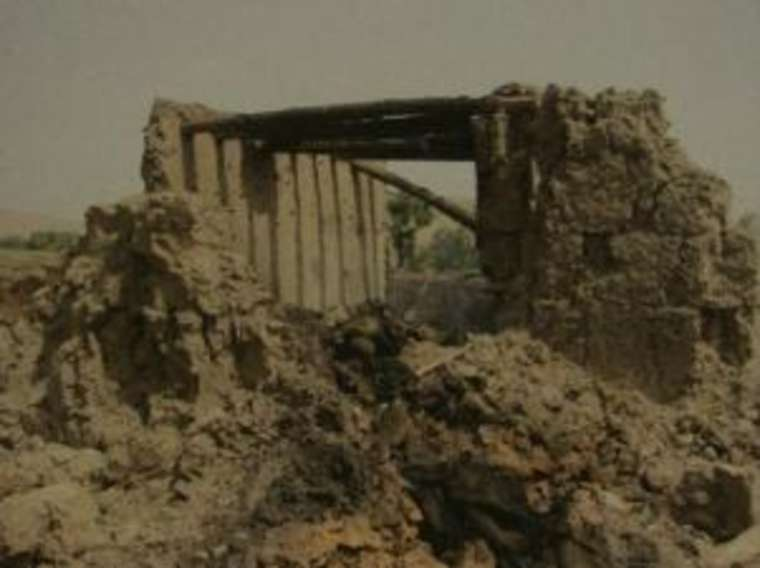
Remains of the structure after bombing

The following day, soldiers including Silver returned to search the premises. Local villagers were believed to have taken away the bodies of the two men killed and given them an Islamic burial. They refused to disclose the location to the Americans, who wanted to identify the fighters.

Believing that the wooden boards beneath the last-killed rifleman could have been used to cover an underground chamber, the soldiers used an excavator to tear down the walls of the buildings. They uncovered five boxes of rifle ammunition, two rockets, two grenades and three rocket-propelled grenades in the huts. Some had accidentally detonated while lying in the smouldering ruins. A plastic bag was discovered in the granary, containing documents, wires and a videocassette. OC-1's report claims the videotape was found in the main house, rather than the granary, and also mentioned detonators modelled as Sega game cartridges.

The video shows Khadr toying with detonating cord as other men, including one later identified as Abu Laith al-Libi, assemble explosives in the same house that had been destroyed the day before by US forces. It is identifiable by its walls, rugs and the environment seen out the windows in the video. The men plant landmines while smiling and joking with the cameraman. A Voice of America report suggested that these were the landmines later recovered by American forces on a road between Gardez and Khost.

The BBC said the US forces and militia had come under small arms fire; a US source noted it was the first time the enemy "had stood his ground" since Operation Anaconda had ended four months earlier.

Hansen and Watt were both awarded a Bronze Star, for running forward under fire to retrieve two fallen bodies. Sources differ on whether these were wounded American soldiers, including Morris, or the two Afghan militiamen shot at the outset. The five wounded men were awarded Purple Hearts. Speer was moved from Bagram airbase to Ramstein Air Base in Germany, where he was removed from life support on August 7 and died; his heart, liver, lungs and kidneys were donated for use by other patients.

== Time at Bagram ==
The unconscious Khadr was airlifted to receive medical attention at Bagram. After he regained consciousness approximately a week later, interrogations began. He remained stretcher-bound for several weeks. Col. Marjorie Mosier operated on his eyes after his arrival, though fellow detainee Rhuhel Ahmed later claimed that Khadr had been denied other forms of surgery to save his eyesight as punishment for not giving interrogators the answers they sought. His requests for darkened sunglasses to protect his failing eyesight were denied for "state security" reasons.

According to a motion to suppress ruling by Guantanamo military judge Patrick Parrish, various interrogation techniques were used on Khadr at Bagram including:

1. The "Fear Up" technique. This technique is described by the judge as "a technique used as an attempt to raise the fear level of a detainee." In Khadr's case it included telling him that a detainee who "lied to interrogators" was raped in the showers by "big, black guys".
2. The "love of freedom" and "Pride/Ego Down" techniques which, according to judge Parrish are "attempts to gather information through appealing to a person's desire to go home or implying that he was not really an important person.."
3. The "Fear of Incarceration" technique, which the judge said was "an attempt to gain cooperation in order to return to a normal life rather than be detained."

Following the hearing, the military judge ruled that there was no credible evidence that Khadr had been tortured as alleged, and that his confession was gained after it was revealed that Americans had discovered a videotape of Khadr and others making IEDs.

On August 20, the United States informed Canada of the capture and asked them to confirm the identity of their prisoner. Ten days later, Canadian officials sent a diplomatic query to the United States requesting consular access to their citizen being held at Bagram. The request was denied, with a statement that Canada would be notified only if Canadian citizens were transferred to Guantánamo Bay. Around this time Khadr was visited by the Red Cross.

Khadr states that he was refused pain medication for his wounds, that he had his hands tied above a door frame for hours, had cold water thrown on him, had a bag placed over his head and was threatened with military dogs, was flatulated upon, and forced to carry 5-US-gallon (19 L) pails of water to aggravate his shoulder wound. Not allowed to use a washroom, he was forced to urinate on himself. His chief interrogator was Joshua Claus. Following the in-custody death of wrongly accused Dilawar that same year, Claus pleaded guilty to abusing detainees to extract confessions.

A letter from the Canadian embassy was sent on September 13, stating that "various laws of Canada and the United States" required special treatment of Khadr due to his age, and requesting that the United States not transfer Khadr to Guantanamo.

According to court documents filed by the US military in 2007, Khadr was interrogated again on September 17, 2002, and stated he helped the militants because he had been told the United States was fighting a war against Islam. When asked if he knew of a US$1,500 bounty being offered for each American soldier killed in Afghanistan, he allegedly responded that he had heard the story, but didn't know who was offering the reward. When asked how that made him feel at the time, the US military reports that Khadr stated "I wanted to kill a lot of American[s] to get lots of money". Khadr's defence characterized these statements as "information [the government] coerced out of him as a 15- or 16-year-old boy recovering from critical wounds inflicted by U.S. forces."

Khadr spent three months recuperating at Bagram. He shared a cell with Moazzam Begg and ten others. He became conversational with guard Damien Corsetti.

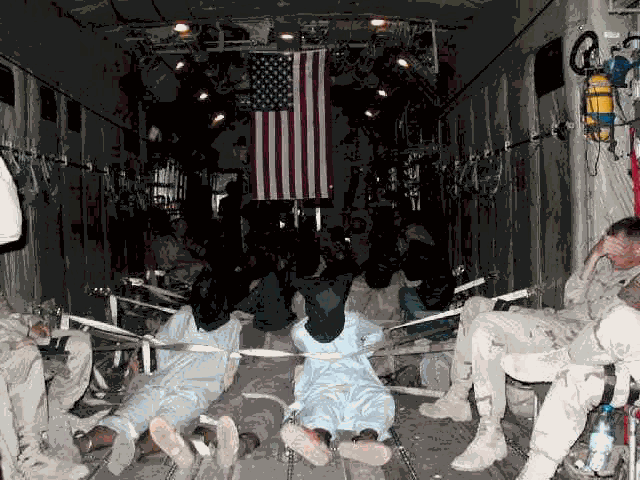
Captives being flown to Guantanamo

On October 7, Federal Bureau of Investigation (FBI) agent Robert Fuller interrogated Khadr. According to Fuller's report, he showed Khadr a photo book of al-Qaeda suspects. Khadr took several minutes to identify Maher Arar from one of the photographs. The report also stated that Khadr thought he saw Arar at a Kabul, Afghanistan safe house in September and October 2001.

The day after the interrogation (October 8, 2002), Arar, who had been in detention at J.F.K. airport for the past 12 days, was extraordinarily rendered to Syria. Khadr was transferred to Guantanamo along with Richard Belmar, Jamal Kiyemba and other captives on October 28, 2002, although Canadian officials were not notified as promised.

== Time at Guantanamo ==
Khadr arrived at Guantanamo Bay on October 29 or 30, 2002, considered an enemy combatant. He was recorded as standing 170 cm (5 ft 7 in) and weighing 70 kg (150 lb). Despite being under 18, he was held as an adult prisoner. Officials considered him an "intelligence treasure trove", as his father was suspected of al-Qaeda activities, and Khadr had personally met Osama bin Laden. Khadr initially spent much of his time in the prison hospital, where he spoke with the Muslim chaplain James Yee, although he didn't seek any religious counselling.

In February 2003, Canadian Foreign Affairs intelligence officer Jim Gould and an official from the Canadian Security Intelligence Service (CSIS) interrogated Khadr.

For three weeks prior to the Canadian visit, the US guards deprived Khadr of sleep, moving him to a new cell every three hours for 21 days in order to "make him more amenable and willing to talk".

Video of February 2003 interrogation by CSIS agents

Gould brought Khadr a Big Mac value meal, with the government stating the visit was "to ascertain Khadr's well-being". His attorneys later applied for and obtained an injunction from Justice Konrad von Finckenstein of the Federal Court of Canada to prevent CSIS from interrogating their client in the future.

The following month, a briefing from the Foreign Affairs department summarized Gould's findings, stating that Khadr was a "thoroughly 'screwed up' young man. All those persons who have been in positions of authority over him have abused him and his trust, for their own purposes." Protesting that DFAIT and CSIS had been allowed to interrogate Khadr, but not the RCMP, Supt. Mike Cabana resigned his post in Project O Canada.

Khadr's lawyers allege that his interrogators "dragged [him] back and forth in a mixture of his urine and pine oil" and did not provide a change of clothes for two days in March 2003. At the end of March 2003, Omar was upgraded to "Level Four" security, and transferred to solitary confinement in a windowless and empty cell for the month of April. In 2003, Khadr began leading prayer groups among the detainees.

A year after he confided in Moazzam Begg, a British citizen who was then a detainee, that his older brother Abdurahman Khadr was working for the Americans, Omar was allowed a brief talk with Abdurahman. He was also being held as a detainee at Guantanamo and has claimed to have been working for the CIA at the time as an informant. His brother was held 50 feet (15 m) away in a separate enclosure. The two shouted to each other in Arabic, and Omar told his older brother not to admit their family's dealings with al-Qaeda, and mentioned that he was losing his left eye. During his stay, the younger Khadr memorized the Quran, according to a letter to his mother.

In March 2004, the Canadian intelligence officer Jim Gould returned to Guantanamo, finding Khadr uncooperative. The Foreign Affairs office said that Khadr was trying to be a "tough guy" and impress his cellmates. His attorney Muneer Ahmad said that Khadr had originally thought Gould "had finally come to help him" in 2003, but by 2004 had realised that he was being interrogated, not aided, by the Canadian government. In all, Khadr was interrogated by Canadians six times between 2003 and 2004, and ordered to identify photos of Canadians believed to have ties to terrorism. When he told the Canadians that he had been tortured by the Americans into giving false confessions, the Canadian authorities said he was a liar. Khadr later recalled that he had "tried to cooperate so that they would take me back to Canada".

In August, the attorneys Rick Wilson and Muneer Ahmad submitted an "emergency motion" asking for the release of Khadr's medical records. Rebuffed, they were given a statement from the Guantanamo naval hospital commander Dr. John S. Edmondson that Khadr was "in good health", and a two-page "Healthcare Services Evaluation".

In November 2004, following a meeting with his attorneys, Khadr was interrogated for four days about what he had discussed with his defence lawyers. He has said that during this time, interrogators used "extreme physical force" and refused to allow him to say his daily prayers.

During this visit, the lawyers had administered a psychological questionnaire known as the "Mini–mental state examination", the results of which they later gave to Dr. Eric W. Trupin, an expert in the developmental psychology of juveniles in confinement. Trupin ruled that Khadr was suffering from "delusions and hallucinations, suicidal behaviour and intense paranoia", and that his abuse had left him "particularly susceptible to mental coercion", and at moderate to high risk of committing suicide. Their efforts to secure approval by the US for an independent medical examination of their client were not successful by mid-2006.

On March 19, 2005, Canadian government officials began a series of regular "welfare visits" to Khadr to monitor his behaviour. He was being held in Camp V, the maximum-security isolation camp, and they had reports that he had thrown urine at guards and was refusing to eat. That year, his older sister Zaynab moved back to Canada from Pakistan to work for better treatment for Omar and his brother Abdullah.

In April 2005, Khadr was given another written psychiatric test by his lawyers, which they gave for interpretation to Dr. Daryl Matthews, a forensic psychologist who had been invited to Guantanamo two years earlier by The Pentagon. Matthews concluded that Khadr met the "full criteria for a diagnosis of post-traumatic stress disorder" (PTSD).

In May 2005, Khadr announced that he would no longer cooperate with any of the American attorneys on his case. His Canadian lawyers convinced him that he had to retain Lt. Cmdr. William C. Kuebler, due to the tribunal regulations which required a military lawyer to be part of the defense. Three months later, the Canadian court upheld the federal injunction banning any further interrogations of Khadr by CSIS.

Khadr participated in the widespread July 2005 hunger strike by 200 detainees, going fifteen days without eating. He was twice taken to the on-site hospital and force-fed. He said that on July 9 he was kicked and assaulted repeatedly by military police after collapsing from weakness.

On July 20, 2005, the Guantánamo detainee Omar Deghayes wrote in his diary, "Omar Khadr is very sick in our block. He is throwing [up] blood. They gave him cyrum [serum] when they found him on the floor in his cell." This extract was published in The Independent.

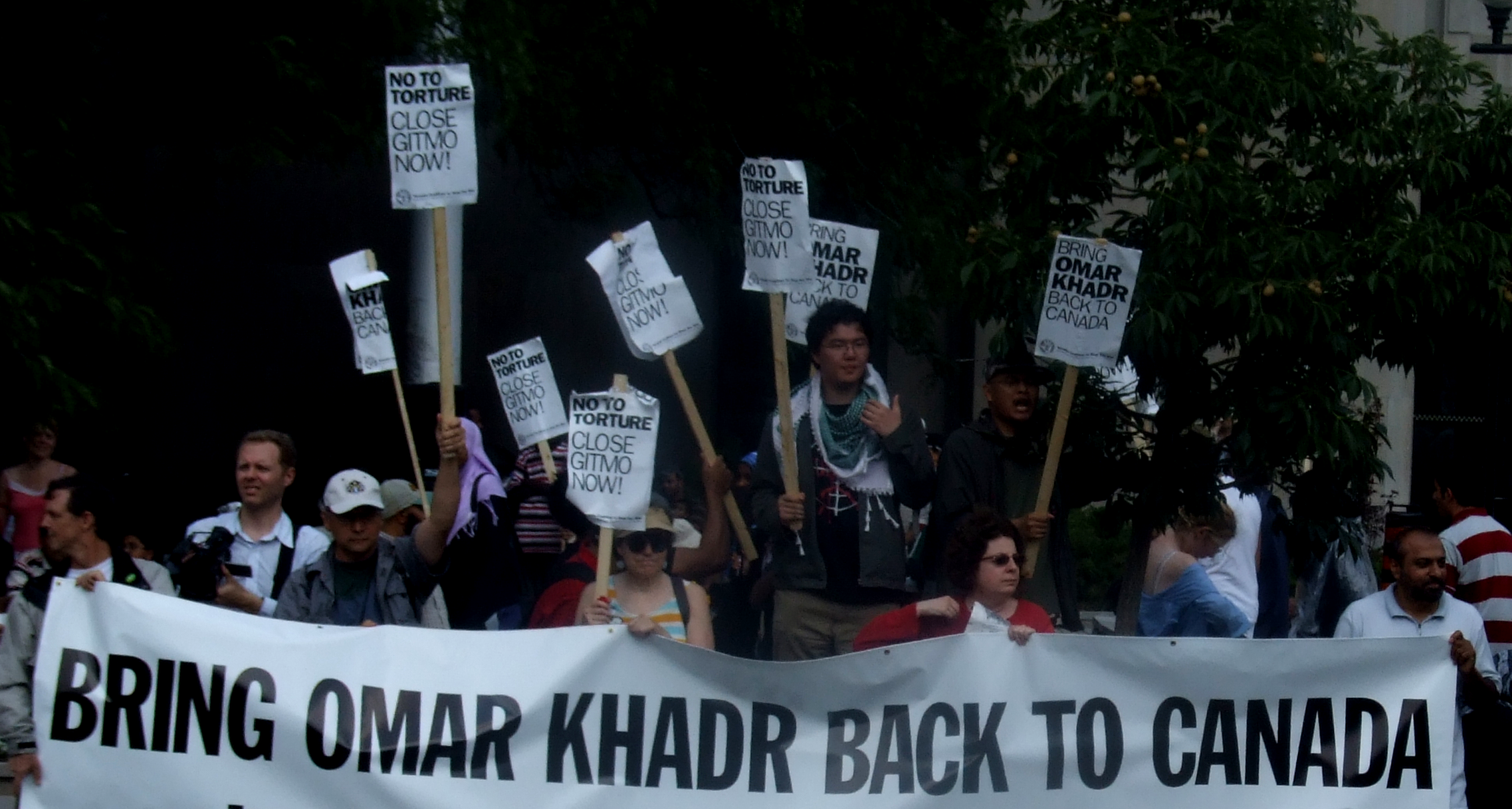
Canadian demonstrators demanding Khadr's repatriation.

In 2006, the US Army began an investigation into the alleged abuse against Khadr while he had been held in Bagram. In July he was transferred back to the isolation cells in Camp V after he expressed distrust of his military lawyers and called the guards "idiots".

On March 6, 2006, he met Clive Stafford Smith, legal director of the British organisation Reprieve, who was representing numerous detainees. They met in the visitation area of Camp V. Khadr told Smith that he had been knocked unconscious by an American grenade blast and did not recall ever throwing any grenades while the firefight went on around him.

In March 2007, Khadr was permitted to speak with his mother by phone for the first time, nearly five years after his capture. He was allowed one other phone call to his family, but had no contact from June 2007 to April 2008. At that time, he was put into Camp VI, the section with the harshest conditions, for what the US said were "disciplinary reasons". Canadian officials argued this was unfair, as Khadr's behaviour largely depended upon which camp he was held within. The US transferred him back to Camp IV.

On April 9, 2008, a box of Khadr's documents was seized, including privileged correspondence with his attorneys; the legal documents were returned a few days later.

Lt. Cmdr. Kuebler arranged for a psychological evaluation from Kate Porterfield, who visited Khadr three times in November 2008. According to Kuebler, Porterfield reported that she was finding it hard to establish trust with Khadr due to "significant psychological trauma".

== Legal trials ==
=== Combatant Status Review Tribunal ===
The trailer where CSR Tribunals were held.

The Supreme Court of the United States ruled in June 2004 Hamdi v. Rumsfeld that detainees are entitled to limited rights of due process. Consequently, the Department of Defense instituted "Combatant Status Review Tribunals".

On August 31, 2004, a Summary of Evidence memo was prepared for Khadr's Combatant Status Review Tribunal. The summary alleged that he had admitted he threw a grenade which killed a U.S. soldier, attended an al Qaida training camp in Kabul and worked as a translator for al Qaida to coordinate land mine missions. In addition, he was accused of helping to plant the landmines between Khost and Ghardez, and having visited an airport near Khost to collect information on U.S. convoy movements.

His actual tribunal was convened on September 7, as Panel #5 reviewed his status in the detainment camp. The tribunal concluded that Khadr was an "enemy combatant" and a one-page summary of conclusions was released on September 17.

=== O.K. v. George W. Bush ===
Following the US Supreme Court ruling in Rasul v. Bush (2004) which established that detainees had the right of habeas corpus to challenge their detentions, Khadr's maternal grandmother Fatmah el-Samnah, acting as next friend, filed a civil suit against the United States on Khadr's behalf on July 2, 2004, to challenge his detention.

The suit was titled O.K. v. George W. Bush, since Khadr was still a minor at the time of its filing. On September 21, 2004, more than sixty Habeas motions filed by Guantanamo detainees were transferred to a single suit before senior Judge Joyce Hens Green for coordination. The remaining issue in the suit— having Khadr's medical records released to his attorneys and gaining an independent medical review of his health while in custody— remained with Judge John D. Bates. On October 26, Bates rejected the motion, stating that "no charges have been brought against petitioner, and accordingly there is no reason to undertake any inquiry into petitioner's mental competence". On August 4, 2008, Department of Justice officials responded to a motion that Khadr should not stand trial because he was a child soldier.

=== First tribunal ===
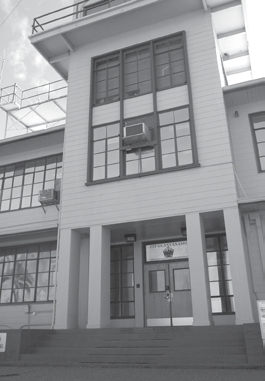
The original Military Commissions were convened in the unused airfield terminal.

In 2005, the United States announced that they were assembling the necessary framework to hold newly crafted Guantanamo military commissions. Believing that Khadr's case represented one of the "easiest" cases to prove, the United States selected him as one of ten detainees to be charged under this new system.

The chief prosecutor Fred Borch attracted internal complaints (discussed publicly in 2006) while court challenges to the process were proceeding. He was replaced by Robert L. Swann, who was replaced in September 2005 by Col. Morris Davis.

On November 7, 2005, Khadr was formally charged with murder by an unprivileged belligerent, attempted murder by an unprivileged belligerent, aiding the enemy and conspiracy with Osama bin Laden, Ayman al Zawahiri, Sayeed al Masri, Muhammad Atef, Saif al-Adel, Ahmed Khadr "and various other members of the al Qaida organization". The United States government informally indicated they would not seek the death penalty for Khadr.

On December 1, 2005, the officers were appointed to Khadr's specific commission. Capt. John Merriam was made Khadr's official defence attorney, but agreed with counsel Muneer Ahmad that he lacked trial experience as a defence attorney, and both men requested that he be replaced. Lt. Col. Colby Vokey was named as Merriam's replacement.

On January 11, 2006, Khadr appeared at his pre-trial hearing wearing a Roots Canada T-shirt, leading judge Robert Chester to order him to wear more suitable attire in the future. The following day, he wore a blue-checkered shirt. Chester insisted that both the prosecution and defence stop referring to Khadr as "Omar" and instead use "Mr. Khadr" to denote the serious nature of the charges facing him. The defense attorney Vokey, a Marine attorney, retired after he was disciplined for calling the tribunals a "sham" that left him feeling "disgusted".

Khadr and the other nine detainees who faced charges were transferred to solitary confinement on March 30. Six days later, Khadr wrote a note to the court saying, "Excuse me Mr. Judge, ... I'm being punished for exercising my right and being co-operative in participating in this military commission. For that, I say with my respect to you and everybody else here, that I'm boycotting these procedures until I be treated humanely and fair."

The commissions were struck down as unconstitutional on June 29, 2006, by the U.S. Supreme Court ruling in Hamdan v. Rumsfeld, which stated that "The military commission at issue lacks the power to proceed because its structure and procedures violate both the UCMJ and the four Geneva Conventions signed in 1949."

Davis resigned as the Guantanamo prosecutor on October 6, 2007, hours after William Haynes was made his superior officer. Davis stated this was due to Haynes' support of water-boarding as an interrogation tactic. Davis was told by his superiors to silence his criticisms.

=== Second tribunal ===
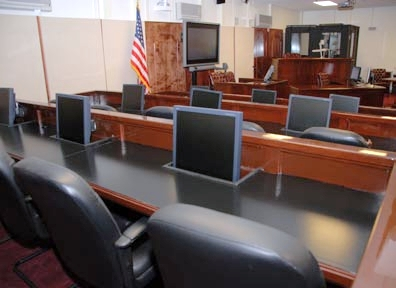
The interior of the courtroom where the second tribunal hearings were held.

After the Military Commissions Act of 2006 (MCA) was signed in October 2006, new charges were sworn against Khadr on February 2, 2007. He was charged with Murder in Violation of the Law of War, Attempted Murder in Violation of the Law of War, Conspiracy, Providing Material Support for Terrorism and Spying. However, these charges did not exist in law prior to the MCA, which postdated the time that the alleged offenses were committed, and are not recognized as war crimes in international law. Canadian attorney Dennis Edney was barred from appearing at the October arraignment, after he criticized Kuebler's efforts, stating that the military lawyer had focused his energy on lobbying Canadian authorities to have Khadr repatriated, at the cost of preparing for the actual trial.

Khadr petitioned the US Supreme Court to review the legality of the military commission and his detention, but this request was denied in April 2007.

On June 1, Edney said that he would not seek any plea bargain for Khadr that would likely see him serve 30 years in prison. Peter Brownback dismissed the charges three days later, stating that Khadr had been previously classified as an "enemy combatant" by his Combatant Status Review Tribunal in 2004, while the Military Commissions Act only granted him jurisdiction to rule over "Unlawful enemy combatants".

On September 9, 2007, charges were reinstated against Khadr after the Court of Military Commission Review overturned Brownback's dismissal, stating that the tribunal could determine the legality of a detainee's status for itself.

On October 9, Jeffrey Groharing argued that the prosecution should not be required to identify their witnesses, stating that Khadr was "certainly capable of exacting revenge" against witnesses if he were allowed the right to face his accusers. Brownback ruled that while the defense attorneys had the right to know the identity of the witnesses, that information could not be given to Khadr himself.

In November, while prosecutors were "desperately" trying to introduce the 27-minute video found in the wreckage, the tape was leaked to the media by an unknown source and shown on 60 Minutes. Four months later, Kuebler stated that following conversations with the show's producers, he believed that the video was leaked by Vice President Dick Cheney's office.

The United Nations requested that Radhika Coomaraswamy, special representative for children in armed conflict, be allowed to watch the tribunal, but the request was denied.

In January, the defence put forward three separate motions to dismiss the trial, arguing that it violated the Constitutional prohibition against bills of attainder, that the commission lacked jurisdiction because Khadr had been a minor when the incident occurred and that there was a lack of subject matter jurisdiction. Sixteen days after the February 4 hearing on the motions, Brownback dismissed the first claim. He dismissed the second claim in April, but has reserved judgment on the third.

February also saw the accidental release of a five-page "OC-1" witness report to reporters, which revealed that Khadr had not been the only survivor in the compound, as previously claimed, and that nobody had seen him throw the grenade. Officials insisted that the reporters all had to return their copies of the document or face expulsion from the hearings, but after a 90-minute standoff between reporters and military officials, it was agreed that they could retain their copies of the report, but had to redact three names from the report.

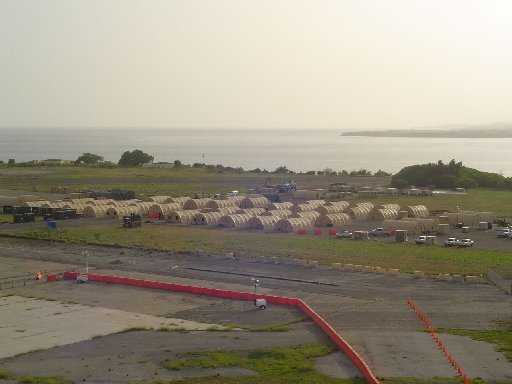
A new tent-city was built at Guantanamo to house the second tribunal trials.

In March, Kuebler insisted that "Lt. Col. W." had initially written in his report the day after the firefight that "the person who threw a grenade that killed Sgt. 1st Class Christopher J. Speer also died in the firefight", implying that the grenade had indeed been thrown by the surviving Mujahideen, and not by Khadr. The report was rewritten months later to say that the grenade thrower had been "engaged", rather than "killed", changing the wording that exonerated Khadr. In response, Brownback ordered that the commander be made available for an interview by the defence counsel no later than April 4. and postponed the scheduled May 5 date for the murder trial to begin, while prosecutor Groharing urged Brownback to begin the trial as soon as possible, stressing a "need for justice" for Speer's widow.

On May 8, 2008, Brownback threatened to suspend the military hearing if prosecutors did not provide the defense with a number of documents, including an al-Qaeda membership list, documents on the relationship between al-Qaeda and Abu Laith al-Libi's Libyan Islamic Fighting Group, copies of the Detainee Information Management System records related to Khadr's treatment in Guantanamo, documents on the use of children by al-Qaeda, investigator notes of witness interviews, details about the militants who were killed in the 2002 firefight, and others. Prosecutors did agree to turn over the videotape of Canadian intelligence official Jim Gould and Canadian Security Intelligence Service (CSIS) agents interrogating Khadr in February 2003, but said they would "alter the tape" to hide the identity of the interrogators. Following Brownback's "ruling against the government", the Pentagon announced that he was being removed from the trial in favour of Patrick Parrish, leading critics to highlight what they believed was "more evidence of the illegitimacy" of the tribunal and that official explanations of the timing as being coincidental were "unconvincing". Parrish, known as "Rocket Docket" for his tendency to speed through trials, immediately ordered a court date of October 8, 2008.

On September 4, Parrish barred Brigadier General Thomas W. Hartmann from participating in the Tribunal because of his "undue command influence", the third such trial Hartmann was accused of trying to corrupt. On October 22, 2008, it was revealed that the Prosecution had given the Defense team an incomplete version of Khadr's medical records five months earlier, and Parrish granted a delay citing the "consequences" of the decision for the prosecution. In December, the Prosecution announced it was withdrawing its intended witness who was to testify that Khadr had confessed to the crimes in December 2004 during interrogation, ostensibly to "cover up" the abusive methods used to make Khadr confess.

=== Supreme Court of Canada ruling on disclosure ===
Khadr's defence attorneys claimed that the Canadian government acted illegally, sending its counsel and CSIS agents to Guantanamo Bay to interrogate Khadr and turning their findings over to the Tribunal prosecutors to help convict Khadr, and that the release of the documents might help prove Khadr's innocence. In 2007, the Federal Court of Appeal ordered the Canadian government to turn over its records related to Khadr's time in captivity, as judge Richard Mosley stated it was apparent that Canada had violated international law. The government appealed to the Supreme Court of Canada in 2008, arguing that Khadr was just "fishing" for information and that disclosing their records, which included an initial account of the firefight that differs from all previously seen reports, could jeopardize national security. Critics alleged that the refusal to release the classified documents was due to the "embarrassment" they caused the government.

On May 23, 2008, the Supreme Court of Canada ruled unanimously that the government had acted illegally, contravening Section Seven of the Charter of Rights and Freedoms, and ordered the videotapes of the interrogation released.

A Canadian documentary, You Don't Like the Truth: Four Days Inside Guantanamo (2010), was made based on the footage of interrogations of Khadr by Canadian intelligence while he was held at Guantanamo.

=== Guilty plea ===
On July 7, 2010, less than one week before the beginning of preliminary hearings in his trial before a military commission, Khadr fired his entire team of lawyers and announced that he would act as his own legal defense. Later in the month, Khadr accepted Lieutenant Colonel Jon S. Jackson as his lead defense counsel.

On October 25, 2010, Khadr pleaded guilty to the murder of Speer in violation of the laws of war, attempted murder in violation of the laws of war, conspiracy, two counts of providing material support for terrorism and spying. Under the plea deal, Khadr would serve at least one more year in Guantanamo Bay before any transfer to Canadian custody. Canadian authorities denied any agreement to repatriate Khadr.

On October 29, 2010, after taking the stand, Khadr apologized to the widow of Speer stating "I'm really sorry for the pain I caused to your family. I wish I could do something to take that pain away.", and further stating that his eight years in prison had taught him "the beauty of life".

=== United Nations reaction to Khadr trial ===
Anthony Lake, the executive director of the United Nations Children's Fund (UNICEF) and former U.S. national security adviser, expressed opposition in 2010 to the plan to prosecute Khadr by a tribunal. He said,

Anyone prosecuted for offences they allegedly committed as a child should be treated in accordance with international juvenile justice standards providing special protections. Omar Khadr should not be prosecuted by a tribunal that is neither equipped nor required to provide these protections and meet these standards.

Radhika Coomaraswamy, the UN Secretary-General's special representative for children and armed conflict, wrote in a 2010 statement that the proposed trial violated international legal norms and "may endanger the status of child soldiers all over the world." "Since World War II, no child has been prosecuted for a war crime," Coomaraswamy said in a statement distributed by the U.N. on the eve of Khadr's trial at Guantánamo.

=== Sentence ruled complete ===
On March 25, 2019, Mary Moreau, Chief Justice of Alberta's Court of Queen's Bench, ruled that Khadr had “served a period of community supervision that is in substance the conditional supervision portion of his sentence.” The Edmonton Journal explained that Moreau's ruling did not mean she was altering his sentence, which would be barred by the 2004 International Transfer of Offenders Act (ITOA) and the 1978 U.S.-Canada prisoner exchange treaty. Rather, she concluded that his bail conditions were very similar to those that would have been imposed upon him if he had been given parole.

Because an earlier court had already determined that Khadr was covered by the Canadian Youth Criminal Justice Act, her ruling was not subject to review.

== Repatriation ==
=== Canadian government position ===
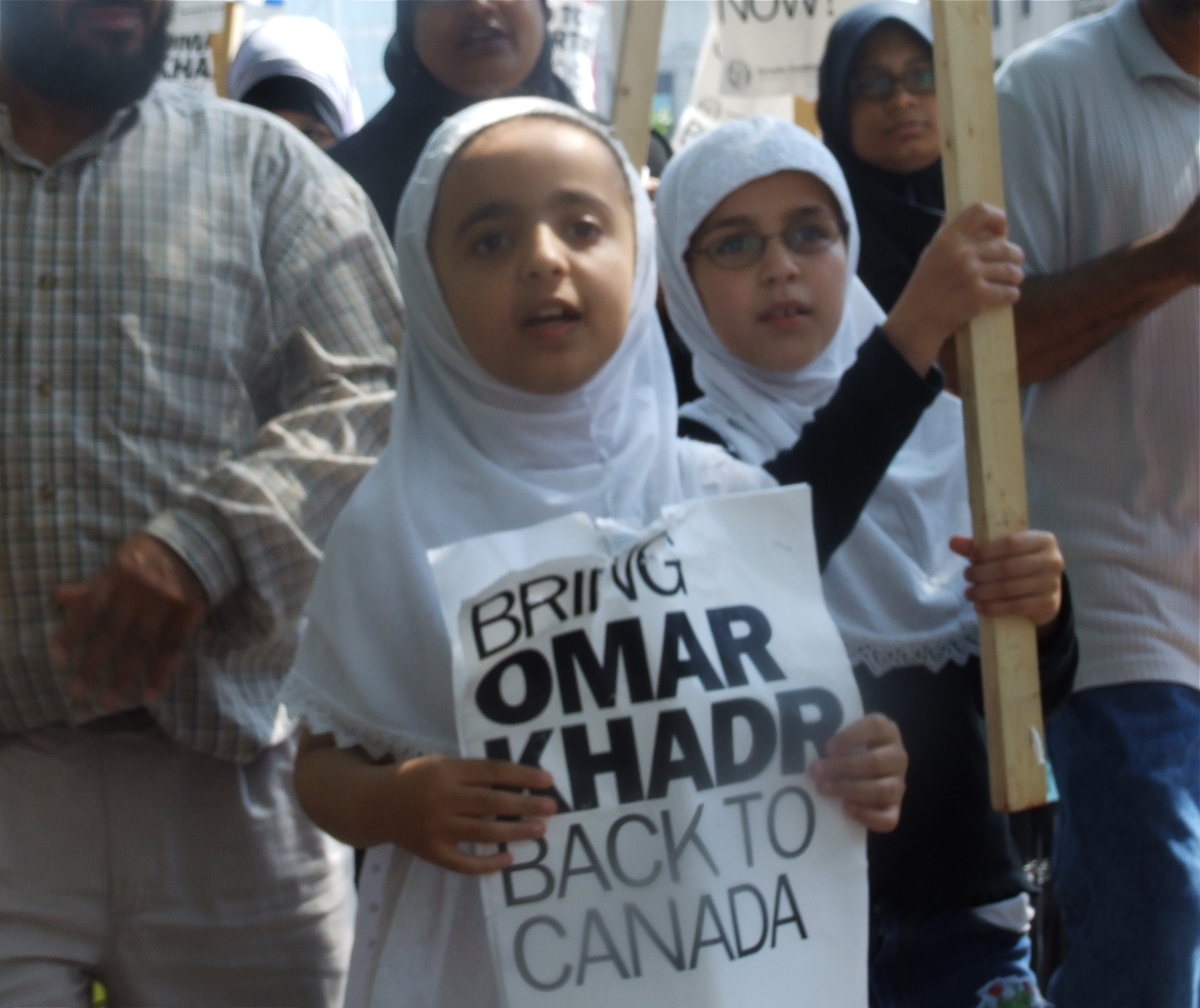
A child at a 2008 demonstration demanding Khadr's repatriation

In 2008, Foreign Affairs officials visited Khadr several times. Karim Amégan and Suneeta Millington reported that Khadr was "salvageable" if allowed to return to Canadian society, but that keeping him in the prison would risk radicalizing him. As of January 2009, 64% of Canadians supported repatriating Khadr to Canada, up from 41% in June 2007.

The Wikileaks Cablegate disclosures in 2010 revealed that the Canadian government had decided against seeking Khadr's repatriation, a decision supported by the US. This made it "politically impossible" for the country to accept custody of Uyghur former detainees whom the US was unable to return to China. The Wikileaks cables showed strong US interest in Canadian reaction to Khadr's case. Jim Judd, the director of Canada's intelligence agency, expressed his belief that the release of DVD footage of Khadr's interrogation at Guantanamo by Canadian officials, in which he is shown crying, would lead to "knee-jerk anti-Americanism" and "paroxysms of moral outrage, a Canadian specialty".

=== Supreme Court of Canada repatriation ruling ===
In April 2009, the Federal Court of Canada ruled again that Khadr's rights under the Charter of Rights and Freedoms had been violated. It concluded that Canada had a "duty to protect" Khadr and ordered the Canadian government to request that the U.S. return him to Canada as soon as possible. In August 2009, the Federal Court of Appeal upheld the decision in a 2–1 ruling. Finally, in January 2010, in a unanimous 9–0 decision, the Supreme Court of Canada ruled that the participation of Canadian officials in Khadr's interrogations at Guantanamo clearly violated his rights under the Charter. In its decision, the Supreme Court referred to the denial of Khadr's legal rights as well as to the use of sleep deprivation techniques to soften him up for interrogation.

The Supreme Court, however, stopped short of ordering the government to seek Khadr's return to Canada. It left it to the government to determine how to exercise its duty to conduct foreign affairs while also upholding its obligation to respect Khadr's constitutional rights.

=== Lead-up to repatriation ===
Khadr's October 2010 plea deal allowed for a return to Canada after serving one additional year in US custody.

In July 2012, Former Canadian Senator Roméo Dallaire set up a petition asking Public Safety Minister Vic Toews to honour the plea bargain deal Khadr made in 2010 when he was released to Canadian custody. 35,000 citizens signed the petition.

On November 30, 2015, State Department emails from Hillary Clinton's private email account were released which revealed how Clinton and her staff worked with the Canadian Foreign Minister, John Baird, to effect Khadr's return to Canada.

=== Return to Canada ===
Khadr was transferred to Canadian custody on September 29, 2012, to serve the remainder of his sentence. He was held at maximum-security prison Millhaven Institution near Bath, Kingston, Ontario, upon his arrival. Under Canadian law, he was eligible for parole in mid-2013. Due to his murder conviction, Khadr was required to be held in maximum security.

On August 13, 2013, Khadr's lawyers, Dennis Edney and Nathan Whitling, filed a brief arguing that under Canada's International Transfer of Offenders Act, it was not legal to hold Khadr in an adult institution, because the eight-year sentence he received from the U.S. military commission could only be interpreted as a youth sentence and he should be detained in a provincial jail rather than a federal prison. Minister of Public Safety Steven Blaney said, "Omar Khadr pleaded guilty to very serious crimes, including the murder of American army medic Sgt. Christopher Speer. The Government of Canada will vigorously defend against any attempted court action to lessen his punishment for these crimes." On December 13, 2013, the Edmonton Journal reported that Kelly Hartle, the warden at the Edmonton maximum security facility, had reclassified Khadr as a medium-security prisoner, and on February 11, 2014, Khadr was transferred to a medium security facility.

In April 2015, The Canadian Press reported that Khadr had been reclassified as a minimum security prisoner.

== Release ==
On May 7, 2015, Khadr was freed on bail with strict conditions, including living with and under supervision of his lawyer. Following his release, in the first public interview Khadr has been allowed by either US or Canadian governments, he begged the public to "give [him] a chance" to "prove to them that [he's] more than what they thought of me, ... that [he's] a good person", saying he was not the man the authorities had portrayed. On May 8, 2015, Canada's Prime Minister Stephen Harper said he was unapologetic about his government's efforts to keep Omar Khadr imprisoned.

A week after his release, the Supreme Court of Canada released a further decision concerning his incarceration. On May 14, 2015, the Supreme Court of Canada rejected the federal government's position, ruling that Khadr had clearly been sentenced by the U.S. military tribunal as a minor. If he lost his appeal of the US conviction, underway in a separate action, he would serve any remaining time in a provincial facility rather than in a federal penitentiary.

On February 18, 2016, the newly elected Liberal federal government dropped the appeal started by the previous Conservative federal government that sought to revoke his bail.

As of April 2016, Khadr was engaged to Muna Abougoush, an Edmonton-based human-rights advocate who helped launch an international campaign to free him and who corresponded with him while he was in prison.

On December 13, 2018, Omar Khadr was back in Edmonton court to ask for changes to bail conditions and on December 21, 2018, an Edmonton judge denied relaxed bail conditions for Khadr, meaning he would not be able to get a Canadian passport to travel to Saudi Arabia and would not be granted unsupervised conversations with his sister.

On March 25, 2019, an Alberta judge ruled that his sentence has expired and Khadr was a free man. He could apply for a passport, and he had no restrictions on whom he can meet.

== Civil suits ==
=== Morris and Speer's suit against Ahmed Khadr ===
Layne Morris and Tabitha Speer, Christopher Speer's widow, both represented by Donald Winder, filed a civil suit against the estate of Ahmed Khadr, claiming that the father's failure to control his son resulted in the loss of Speer's life and Morris's right eye. Since United States law does not allow civil lawsuits against "acts of war", Speer and Morris relied on the argument that Khadr's throwing the grenade was an act of terrorism, rather than war. In February 2006, Utah District Court Judge Paul Cassell awarded the plaintiffs $102.6 million in damages, approximately $94 million to Speer and $8 million to Morris. He said it likely marks the first time terrorist acts have resulted in civil liabilities. It has been suggested that the plaintiffs might collect funds via the U.S. Terrorism Risk Insurance Act, but the US federal government is not bound by civil rulings, and it has refused to release Khadr's frozen assets.

=== Omar Khadr's suit against the Canadian government ===
In 2013, Khadr filed a CA$20 million civil suit against the Government of Canada alleging that it had conspired with the U.S. in abusing his rights. He said he had signed the plea agreement because he believed it was the only way he could gain transfer from Guantanamo, and claimed that he had no memory of the firefight in which he was wounded.

On July 4, 2017, an unnamed government source leaked that the Canadian government would apologize and pay CA$10.5 million in compensation to Khadr. At a press conference on July 7, 2017, Attorney General Jody Wilson-Raybould and Public Safety Minister Ralph Goodale confirmed the settlement and issued a formal apology on behalf of the government. In an interview with Rosemary Barton of Power & Politics that day, Khadr said that he hoped the apology restores a little bit of his reputation. He also said that he hoped the settlement and apology would not cause the Speer family pain and said that if it does, he was sorry for that.

=== Morris and Speer's suit against Omar Khadr ===
In 2014, Layne Morris and Tabitha Speer filed a wrongful death and injury lawsuit against Khadr. In 2015, a Utah judge granted them a US$134 million default judgment after Khadr did not respond to the suit. In 2017, Morris and Speer filed an application to make the judgment enforceable in Canada, which as of July 4, 2017 was yet to have been heard. A judge rejected July 2017 a bid to freeze the assets of Khadr.
