= Jabran al-Qahtani =

Saudi former Guantanamo Bay detainee (born 1977)

Jabran Said bin Wazir al-Qahtani
- Born: December 13, 1977 (age 48); Tabuk, Saudi Arabia
- Arrested: March 2, 2002; Faisalabad; CIA, Pakistani security officials
- Released: 2017-01-19; Saudi Arabia
- Citizenship: Saudi Arabia
- Detained at: Guantanamo
- Other name: Jabran Said Wazar Al Qahtani
- ISN: 696
- Charge: War crimes charges have been dismissed.
- Status: Repatriated 2017-01-19

Jabran Said bin Wazir al-Qahtani is a Saudi who was held in extrajudicial detention for almost fifteen years in the United States Guantanamo Bay detention camps, in Cuba. Joint Task Force Guantanamo analysts estimate he was born in 1977, in Tabuk, Saudi Arabia.

Al-Qahtani arrived at Guantanamo on August 5, 2002, and was transferred to Saudi Arabia on January 19, 2017.

He graduated from the King Saud University in Saudi Arabia with an engineering degree.

== Inconsistent identification ==
Jabran Said Bin Wazir al-Qahtani was named inconsistently on various documents released by the Department of Defense:

- He was called Jabran Said Wazar Al Qahtani on the Summary of Evidence memo prepared for his Combatant Status Review Tribunal, on August 30, 2004, and on three official list of captive's names.
- He was called Jabran Said Bin Al Qahtani on the charges he faced before a military commission, on November 7, 2005.

== Charges before a military commission ==
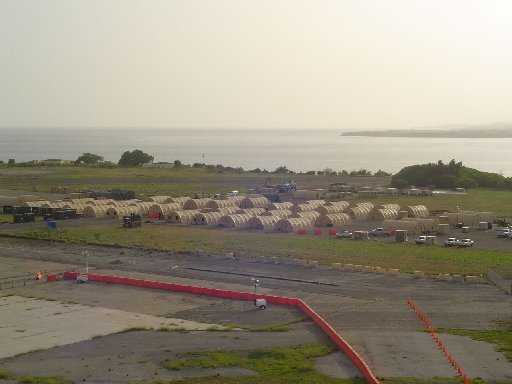
$12 million tent city built at Guantanamo for up to 80 of Military Commissions authorized in 2006

On November 7, 2005, the United States charged Jabran al-Qahtani and four other detainees. The Bush administration intends to prosecute these detainees before a military commission. Al-Qahtani, Sufyian Barhoumi, Binyam Ahmed Muhammad, and Ghassan Abdullah al Sharbi face conspiracy to murder charges in relation to being part of a bomb-making cell. The Canadian citizen, 18-year-old Omar Khadr, faces both murder and conspiracy to murder charges.

Al-Qahtani, Barhoumi and al-Sharbi were dubbed "The Faisalabad Three" because they were captured together in that city. The three were captured with Abu Zubaydah, long believed to be a senior member of the al Qaeda leadership, in a safehouse in Faisalabad, Pakistan. The three are believed to have been members of Zubaydah's entourage. Zubaydah was later found to be a low-level functionary.

The three detainees kept insisting they wanted to defend themselves without the help of military or civilian attorneys.

In April 2006, al-Qahtani was one of three detainees charged in a military commission with being part of a bomb-making cell. He had boycotted the tribunals; his defense attorney, Army Lt. Col. Bryan Broyles, said that rights advocates have criticized the tribunals as "stacked to deliver convictions".

At the time, the tribunals were being challenged at the Supreme Court level. In Hamdan v. Rumsfeld (2006), the court found they were unconstitutional, as the executive branch had set up a separate judicial system outside the existing civil and military systems. In addition, it faulted the commissions for failures to protect defendants' rights. That year, Congress passed the Military Commissions Act of 2006, to authorize a separate system to prosecute enemy combatants and respond to issues raised by the Court. But, it also restricted detainees' access to federal courts and the use of the habeas corpus process. Pending suits were stayed.

Al Qahtani and the other men were re-charged in May 2008. On October 21, 2008, Susan J. Crawford, the Bush official in charge of convening the Office of Military Commissions, announced that the charges were dropped against Jabran Al Qahtani and four other captives, Binyam Mohamed, Ghassan al Sharbi, Sufyian Barhoumi, and Noor Uthman Muhammed. Carol J. Williams, writing in the Los Angeles Times reports that all five men had been connected to Abu Zubaydah—one of the three captives whom the CIA has acknowledged was interrogated using the technique known as "waterboarding", commonly thought of as torture.

Williams said the men's attorneys expected new charges to be filed against the five within 30 days. They told Williams that: "... prosecutors called the move procedural", and attributed it to the resignation of the Prosecutor Darrel Vandeveld, who resigned on ethical grounds. Williams reported that Clive Stafford Smith, legal director of Reprieve, which represents numerous detainees, speculated that the Prosecution's dropping of the charges was intended to counter and disarm the testimony Vandeveld was expected to offer, that the Prosecution had withheld exculpatory evidence.

== Joint Review Task Force ==
When he assumed office in January 2009, President Barack Obama made a number of promises about the future of Guantanamo. He promised the use of torture would cease at the camp. He promised to institute a new review system. That new review system was composed of officials from six departments, where the OARDEC reviews were conducted entirely by the Department of Defense. When it reported back, a year later, the Joint Review Task Force classified some individuals as too dangerous to be transferred from Guantanamo, even though there was no evidence to justify laying charges against them. On April 9, 2013, that document was made public after a Freedom of Information Act request. Jabran al-Qahtani was one of the 71 individuals deemed too innocent to charge, but too dangerous to release. Although Obama promised that those deemed too innocent to charge, but too dangerous to release would start to receive reviews from a Periodic Review Board less than a quarter of men have received a review.
