= Faisalabad Three =

The Faisalabad Three is a term used to refer to three of Guantanamo detainees facing charges before military commissions. Jabran Said bin al Qahtani, Sufyian Barhoumi and Ghassan Abdullah al Sharbi were captured in a safehouse in Faisalabad, Pakistan, together with approximately a dozen other suspects, including a senior member of the Al Qaeda leadership, Abu Zubaydah.

Barhoumi, al Qahtani, and al Sharbi have all tried to decline legal representation.

Abdul Zahir, the tenth Guantanamo detainee to face charges, was also captured in that safehouse.

Faisalabad is the home of Salafi University, a donation supported religious institution that provides free room and board to international students—a number of these were captured on suspicion of being tied to terrorism.

== Hamdan v. Rumsfeld ruling and the Military Commissions Act ==
In the summer of 2006, the United States Supreme Court ruled that the President lacked the constitutional authority to set up military commissions. The Supreme Court ruled that only the United States Congress had the authority to do so. All ten captives who had faced charges before the presidentially authorized military commissions had those charges dropped.

In the fall of 2006, Congress passed the Military Commissions Act of 2006, which authorized commissions similar to those President George W. Bush had tried to set up. Only three captives faced charges before these commissions.

However, in 2008, the Office of Military Commissions started to accelerate the pace at which charges were laid. Over a dozen captives who had not been charged earlier were charged via the congressionally authorized commissions. Subsequently the Office of Military Commissions started to re-charge the captives who had faced charges earlier.

== New charges ==
On May 29, 2008, charges were laid against Barhoumi, al Qahtani, and al Sharbi.
