= Noor Uthman Muhammed =

- Born: 1 January 1962 (age 64) (Note: Birth date unknown according to detainee list dated 15 May 2006); Kassala, Sudan
- Detained at: Guantanamo
- Other names: Muhammed Noor Uthman; Zamir Muhammed
- ISN: 707
- Charge: Charges initiated 23 May 2008.
- Status: Transferred to Sudan

Noor Uthman Muhammed (born 1962) is a citizen of Sudan who was confined in the United States Guantanamo Bay detention camp in Cuba where he also served a sentence for terrorism after being convicted by the Guantanamo military commission.

The Department of Defense reports that Muhammed was born in Kassala, Sudan.

== Background ==
Noor Uthman Muhammaed is a citizen of Sudan who described working at the Khalden training camp, in Afghanistan, from the mid-1990s, until it was shut down in 2000. He first worked as a small-arms instructor, but after a few months of discontent he asked for a transfer. Instead, Noor Uthman Muhammad was assigned as Khalden training camp's quartermaster. He was responsible for the collection and distribution of camp supplies, such as food, water and firewood. He denies membership in al Qaida or the Taliban, and described the Khalden camp as being an independent camp.

Joint Task Force Guantanamo counter-terrorism analysts describe him as being a senior member of al Qaida's leadership cadre. Noor Uthman Muhammaed was captured in Abu Zubaydah's house in Faisalabad on 24 March 2002, along with Abu Zubaydah, Sufyian Barhoumi, Ghassan al-Shirbi, Jabran Al Qahtani and several other suspects. Three of the other captives captured in that house were to face charges before the Guantanamo military commissions in 2005 and 2006.

== Charges ==
Noor Uthman Muhammed was charged with conspiracy and providing support to terrorists on 23 May 2008.

On 21 October 2008, Susan J. Crawford, the official in charge of the Office of Military Commissions announced charges were being dropped against Noor Uthman and four other captives: Jabran al Qahtani, Ghassan al Sharbi, Sufyian Barhoumi, and Binyam Mohamed. Carol J. Williams, writing in the Los Angeles Times reports that all five men had been connected by Abu Zubaydah—one of the three captives the CIA has acknowledged was interrogated using the controversial technique known as "waterboarding".

Williams quoted the men's attorneys, who anticipated the five men would be re-charged in thirty days. They told Williams that: "... prosecutors called the move procedural", and attributed it to the resignation of fellow Prosecutor Darrel Vandeveld, who resigned on ethical grounds. Williams reported that Clive Stafford Smith speculated that the Prosecution's dropping of the charges, and plans to subsequently re-file charges later was intended to counter and disarm the testimony Vandeveld was anticipated to offer, that the Prosecution had withheld exculpatory evidence.

The current charges against Noor Uthman were instated on 5 December 2008.

The Barack Obama Presidency was granted a continuance on 21 October 2009. The military commissions for five other captives have been granted continuances, until 16 November 2009.

On 13 November 2009, the Attorney General Eric Holder announced that Noor Uthman's case would continue in a military commission.

On 8 April 2010, Carol Rosenberg, writing in the Miami Herald, reported Captain Moira Modzelewski, the Presiding Officer over Noor's military commission, predicted she would require a year to review the secret evidence against Noor. According to Rosenberg the provisions within the Military Commissions Act of 2009 allowed the use of classified evidence, but only after a review by the Presiding Officer. The Prosecution could submit a summary of classified evidence, in lieu of the evidence itself, but the Presiding Officer was required to review every document the summary was based on, to ensure it was a fair summary.

On 21 September 2010, Carol Rosenburg, again writing in the Miami Herald, reported that prosecutor Marine Major James Weirick stated that "Noor Uthman Mohammed for a number of years was the principal trainer and in charge of all training at the Khalden training camp in Afghanistan that provided numerous individuals who went on to serve for al Qaida."

On 15 February 2011, Noor Uthman Muhammed pleaded guilty to providing material support for terrorism, and conspiracy to providing material support to an international terrorist organization and terrorism. He was sentenced to 14 years of confinement.

On 15 May 2013, Charlie Savage, reporting in The New York Times, reported that although Noor's plea deal was supposed to see him serve an additional 34 months in Guantanamo, he might not be released, after all. Savage was reporting on an April motion from Noor's lawyer, that requested the Presiding Officer to compel the DoD to release Noor as scheduled. They asserted that Noor had fully complied with the plea deal, but the officials known as the Convening Authority were not doing so. Further, Savage noted the exemption in law Congress had passed barring the release of captives—unless they had been sentenced and completed their terms—was going to expire three months before Noor's scheduled release. An additional complication was that the Washington DC Circuit Court of Appeals had overturned the sentences of two other captives who had pleaded guilty to the same change Noor pleaded to, as the charges barred the fundamental principle that no one should face charges for an act that was legal at the time they committed it, and that Noor too was likely to have his sentence overturned.

After serving 34 months of his sentence, Noor was transferred to his native Sudan on 19 December 2013.
