= Binyam Mohamed =

Ethiopian-British Guantanamo detainee

Binyam Ahmed Mohamed
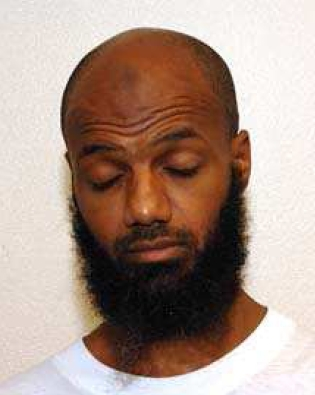
- Born: 24 July 1978 (age 48); Addis Ababa, Ethiopia
- Detained at: The dark prison, Temara interrogation centre, Ain Aouda secret prison, Guantanamo
- Other names: Benjamin Mohammed, Benyam (Ahmed) Mohammed, Benyam Mohammed al-Habashi
- ISN: 1458
- Charge: All charges dropped
- Status: Released

Binyam Ahmed Mohamed (Amharic: ብንያም መሐመድ, Arabic: بنيام محمد, born 24 July 1978), also referred to as Benjamin Mohammed, Benyam Mohammed or Benyam Mohammed al-Habashi, is an Ethiopian national and United Kingdom resident, who was detained as a suspected enemy combatant by the US Government in Guantanamo Bay prison between 2004 and 2009 without charges. He was arrested in Pakistan and transported first to Morocco under the US's extraordinary rendition program, where he claimed to have been interrogated under torture.

After some time, Mohamed was transferred to military custody at Guantanamo Bay detention camp. Mohamed's military Personal Representative at the time of his Combatant Status Review Tribunal reported that he had said that he had gone to train in the Al Farouq training camp only in order to train to fight in Chechnya. Mohamed also said that the evidence against him was obtained using torture and later denied any confession.

The US dropped its charges against him, and eventually released him. He arrived in the United Kingdom on 23 February 2009. Together with other detainees, he took legal action against the UK government for collusion by MI5 and MI6 in his torture by the United States. In February 2010, the UK Court of Appeal ruled that he had been subjected to "cruel, inhuman and degrading treatment by the United States authorities" in which the British Intelligence services had been complicit. The UK government agreed to pay an undisclosed sum in compensation in November 2010.

== Early life and background ==
Born in Ethiopia, Mohamed immigrated to Canada in 1995, where he sought political asylum. He lived there for seven years with leave to remain while his application was resolved. He was seeking Permanent Resident status.

== Travel to Asia ==
In June 2001, Mohamed travelled to Afghanistan, for reasons which are in dispute. He and his supporters said that he had gone to conquer his drug problems and to see Muslim countries "with his own eyes". The British and U.S. authorities contend, and the Personal Representative's initial interview notes record, that Mohamed admitted receiving paramilitary training in the al Farouq training camp run by al-Qaeda. He admitted to military training, but said that it was to fight with the Muslim resistance in Chechnya against the Russians, which was not illegal. Mohamed said that he had made false statements while being tortured in Pakistani jails.

== Arrest and detention ==
On 10 April 2002, Mohamed was arrested at Karachi airport by Pakistani authorities as a suspected terrorist, while attempting to return to the UK under a false passport. Mohamed contends that he was subjected to extraordinary rendition by the United States, and entered a "ghost prison system" run by US intelligence agents in Pakistan, Morocco and Afghanistan. While he was held in Morocco, he said that interrogators tortured him by repeatedly using scalpels or razor blades to cut his penis and chest.

On 19 September 2004, Mohamed was taken by U.S. military authorities from Bagram airbase in Afghanistan to their Guantánamo Bay detention camp at their Navy base in Cuba. He says that he was "routinely humiliated and abused and constantly lied to" there.

In February 2005, he was placed in Camp V, the harsh "super-maximum" facility where, reports suggest, "uncooperative" detainees are held. He was told that he would be required to testify against other detainees.

Mohamed's British barrister, Clive Stafford Smith, legal director of Reprieve said that Mohamed participated in lengthy hunger strikes in 2005 to protest against the harsh conditions and lack of access to any judicial review. The hunger strike started in July 2005, and resumed in August 2005 because the detainees believed the US authorities failed to keep promises to meet their demands.

From a written statement by Mohamed dated 11 August 2005:

The administration promised that if we gave them 10 days, they would bring the prison into compliance with the Geneva conventions. They said this had been approved by Donald Rumsfeld himself in Washington DC. As a result of these promises, we agreed to end the strike on July 28. It is now August 11. They have betrayed our trust (again). Hisham from Tunisia was savagely beaten in his interrogation and they publicly desecrated the Qur'an (again). Saad from Kuwait was ERF'd [subjected to the Extreme Reaction Force] for refusing to go (again) to interrogation because the female interrogator had sexually humiliated him (again) for 5 hours _ Therefore, the strike must begin again.

== Charged with conspiracy ==
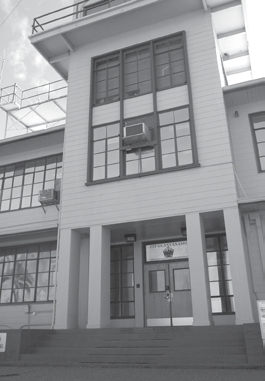
Ten Presidentially authorised Military Commissions were convened in the former terminal building of the disused airfield on the Guantanamo Naval Base's Eastern Peninsula.

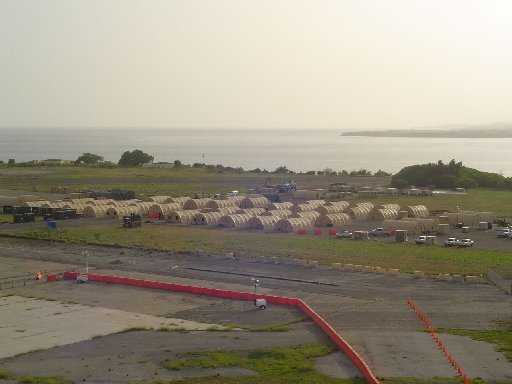
The U.S. Government planned to house up to 80 of the new Congressionally authorised Military Commissions in a $12 million tent city.

On 7 November 2005, Mohamed was charged by a military commission at Guantanamo with conspiracy. The complaint alleges that Mohamed was trained in Kabul to build dirty bombs (weapons combining conventional explosives with radioactive material intended to be dispersed over a large area). According to the complaint, he "was planning terror attacks against high-rise apartment buildings in the United States and was arrested at an airport in Pakistan, attempting to go to London while using a forged passport."

At the start of his military commission, Mohamed chose to represent himself. He protested against the commissions, and said he was not the person charged because the prosecution had spelled his name incorrectly. He held up a sign "con mission" and stated: "This is not a commission, it's a con mission, It's a mission to con the world."

In mid-2006, the United States Supreme Court ruled in Hamdan v. Rumsfeld that the President lacked the constitutional authority to create military commissions outside the regular federal and military justice systems, and they were unconstitutional. Mohamed's military commission was halted.

In late 2008, the United States Department of Defense (DOD) filed new charges against Mohamed after the United States Congress authorised new military commissions under the Military Commissions Act of 2006 to respond to the Supreme Court ruling.

On 21 October 2008, Susan J. Crawford, the official in charge of the Office of Military Commissions, announced that charges were dropped against Mohamed and four other captives, Jabran al Qahtani, Ghassan al Sharbi, Sufyian Barhoumi, and Noor Uthman Muhammed.

Carol J. Williams, writing in the Los Angeles Times, reported that all five men had been connected to Abu Zubaydah—one of the three captives the CIA has acknowledged was interrogated using the controversial technique known as waterboarding. Williams quoted the men's attorneys, who anticipated the five men would be re-charged within thirty days. They told Williams that "prosecutors called the move procedural", and attributed it to the resignation of fellow Prosecutor Darrel Vandeveld, who resigned on ethical grounds. Williams reported that Clive Stafford Smith speculated that the Prosecution's dropping of the charges, and plans to re-file charges later, was intended to counter and disarm the testimony Vandeveld was anticipated to offer that the Prosecution had withheld exculpatory evidence.

== Accusations of abusive incarceration and UK complicity ==
In December 2005, the declassification of his lawyer's notes permitted Mohamed's additional claims of abusive interrogation to be made public. He said that he had been transported by the US to a black site known as "the dark prison" in Kabul, where captives were permanently chained to the wall, kept in constant darkness, and was subjected to Dr. Dre and "The Real Slim Shady" by Eminem at extremely loud levels for 20 days.

Mohamed's attorneys reported that he had been subjected to "extraordinary rendition", transferred to Morocco, where he was tortured, in addition to the CIA interrogation centres in Afghanistan, prior to his transfer to Guantánamo in 2004.

On 21 June 2008, The New York Times reported that the UK Government had sent a letter to Clive Stafford Smith, confirming that it had information about Mohamed's allegations of abuse. On 28 July, his lawyers filed a petition in a UK court to compel the Foreign Office to turn over the evidence of Mohamed's abuse. They also filed a petition with the Irish government for the records of his illegal air transport over Ireland. On 21 August, the High Court of the United Kingdom found in Mohamed's favour, ruling that the Foreign Office should disclose this material. The judges said of the information that it was "not only necessary but essential for his defence".

Although the documents were disclosed to Mohamed's legal counsel as ordered, they were not released to the general public. The High Court later found in favour of the Foreign Secretary to prevent the publication of these materials. The reasons given were that—even if it was unreasonable for it to affect international relations—if the Foreign Secretary thought it was going to harm the special intelligence relationship with the United States, it would not be in the public interest.

In February 2009, CBC News reported that Mohamed had described being warned to cooperate by two women, who represented themselves as Canadians. Each woman had represented herself as a third-party intervener, who warned Mohamed that she thought he should co-operate. Each suggested he should answer the Americans' questions fully, or he was likely to be tortured. According to the CBC report, Canada had an obligation to object if it determined that the Americans had falsely represented US security officials as Canadians, as a ploy to trick Mohamed into confessing.

== British request for release of legal residents ==
On 7 August 2007, the British Foreign Secretary David Miliband requested that the US release Mohamed and four other Guantánamo detainees, all of whom had been granted refugee status or other legal right to remain in the United Kingdom, prior to their capture by US forces. Previously, the British government had only sought the release of British citizens, not residents.

== Civil suit ==
On 1 August 2007, Mohamed joined a civil suit filed with the assistance of the American Civil Liberties Union under the United States' Alien Tort Statute against Jeppesen Dataplan, which had operated the planes that carried him during extraordinary rendition. The defendant in the case was a Boeing subsidiary accused of arranging extraordinary rendition flights for the CIA. Mohamed had a joint lawsuit with four other plaintiffs: Bisher Al-Rawi, Abou Elkassim Britel, Ahmed Agiza, and Mohamed Farag Ahmad Bashmilah.

Accepting the argument of the Obama administration that hearing the case would divulge state secrets, the United States Court of Appeals for the Ninth Circuit dismissed the lawsuit on 8 September 2010.

== Release ==
On 7 August 2007, the United Kingdom government requested the release of Binyam Mohamed and four other men who had been legal British residents. He was not released however, and in June 2008 the U.S. military announced they were formally charging him. Later that year, he went on a hunger strike to protest his continued detention. On 16 January 2009, The Independent reported that Mohamed had told his lawyers he had been told to prepare for return to the United Kingdom. The Independent quoted a recently declassified note from Mohamed: "It has come to my attention through several reliable sources that my release from Guantánamo to the UK had been ordered several weeks ago. It is a cruel tactic of delay to suspend my travel till the last days of this [Bush] administration while I should have been home a long time ago."

In an interview with Jon Snow of Channel 4 News on 9 February, Mohamed's assigned military defence lawyer, Lt-Col Yvonne Bradley, asserted that there was no doubt that Mohamed had been tortured, and that Britain and the US were complicit in his torture. Bradley subsequently took up his case directly with British Foreign Secretary David Miliband on 11 February. According to Agence France Presse, Mohamed had been on a hunger strike but had stopped on 5 February, when his lawyers informed him he could soon expect transfer to the UK. He was visited on 14 and 15 February by a delegation of UK officials, including a doctor who confirmed he was healthy enough to be flown back to England. On 23 February, almost seven years after his arrest, Mohamed was repatriated from Guantánamo to the UK, where he was released after questioning.

== Allegations of MI5 collusion ==
Two weeks after Mohamed's release, the BBC published claims that the British domestic security service MI5 had colluded with his interrogators. They provided specific questions and his responses led to his making false confessions of terrorist activities. In a first memo, an MI5 agent asked for a name to be put to Mohamed and for him to be questioned further about that person. A second telegram concerned another interrogation. The legal organisation Reprieve, which represents Mohamed, said its client was shown the MI5 telegrams by his military lawyer Yvonne Bradley. While the claims of MI5 collusion were being investigated by the British government, the Shadow Justice Secretary, Dominic Grieve, called for a judicial inquiry into the allegations and for the matter to be referred to the police. Shami Chakrabarti, director of campaign group Liberty said: "These are more than allegations – these are pieces of a puzzle that are being put together. It makes an immediate criminal investigation absolutely inescapable."

On 12 March 2009, in an op-ed piece in The Guardian, the analyst Timothy Garton Ash called for Mohamed's claims of torture and MI5 collusion to be referred to the Director of Public Prosecutions. He said that any other decision "will inevitably be interpreted as a political cover-up." On 10 February 2010, the UK Court of Appeal ruled that material held by the UK Foreign Secretary must be revealed. "MI5 knew that Binyam Mohamed, the former Guantanamo detainee, was being tortured by the CIA, a Court of Appeal judgment has revealed." The court opinion noted:

...cruel, inhuman and degrading treatment by the United States authorities.

The treatment reported, if had been administered on behalf of the United Kingdom, would clearly have been in breach of the undertakings given by the United Kingdom in 1972 [in the UN convention on torture].

Combined with the sleep deprivation, threats and inducements were made to him. His fears of being removed from United States custody and ‘disappearing’ were played upon.

The former detainees' suit against the government for the collusion of MI5 and MI6 in the unlawful treatment by the CIA, was eventually tried in 2009. Despite attempts by the Foreign Secretary, David Miliband, to suppress evidence on the grounds that such disclosure would harm national security, the government lost the case in the High Court.

On 14 December, Miliband appealed against six High Court rulings that CIA information on Mohamed's treatment, and what MI5 and MI6 knew about it, must be disclosed. In an unprecedented case, counsel for The Guardian and other media organisations, Mohamed and two civil rights groups, Liberty and Justice, argued that the public interest in disclosing the role played by British and US agencies in unlawful activities far outweighed any claim about potential threats to national security. On 20 December, a U.S. District Court judge, Gladys Kessler, found that there was "credible" evidence that a British resident was tortured while being detained on behalf of the US Government. Her formerly classified legal opinion, obtained by The Observer, records that the US Government does not dispute "credible" evidence that Binyam Mohamed had been tortured while being held at its behest.

On 27 January 2010, The Guardian reported that "United Nations human rights investigators had concluded that the British government had been complicit in the mistreatment and possible torture of several of its own citizens during the 'war on terror'". Among listed cases in which the authors concluded that a state has been complicit in secret detention, they highlight "the United Kingdom in the cases of several individuals, including Binyam Mohamed". On 10 February, three Court of Appeal judges ordered the British government to reveal evidence of MI5 and MI6 complicity in the torture of Binyam Mohamed, overruling the Foreign Secretary, David Miliband.

In response to highly critical media coverage of the torture, Alan Johnson, the Home Secretary, insisted that these were "baseless, groundless accusations". He denied that government lawyers had forced the judiciary to water down criticism of MI5, despite an earlier draft ruling by Lord Neuberger, the Master of the Rolls, that the Security Service had failed to respect human rights, had deliberately misled parliament, and had a "culture of suppression" that undermined government assurances about its conduct.

According to The Washington Post, the court order forcing the British Government to publish secret memos that it received from US intelligence officials will jeopardise future US-UK intelligence sharing. The Washington Post quoted "White House officials" on 10 February 2010, who said the publication: "will complicate the confidentiality of our intelligence-sharing relationship". According to The Guardian, an anonymous White House official told them: "the court decision would not provoke a broad review of intelligence liaison between Britain and the US because the need for close co-operation was greater now than ever."

In November 2010, Mohamed received an undisclosed sum as compensation from the British government as part of a settlement of a number of suits against the government for collusion by MI5.

== Representation in the media ==
- Binyam Mohamed's case was featured in Extraordinary Rendition, a documentary by AlphaOne Productions.
- We Are Not Ghouls, a documentary film about Binyam Mohamed's case, was released in 2022.

== See also ==
Suspected secret torture centres in Morocco where Binyam Mohamed was held:

- Temara interrogation centre
- Ain Aouda secret prison
