= Ain Aouda secret prison =

Suspected detention center operated in Ain Aouda, Morocco

Ain Aouda
- Interactive map of Ain Aouda
- Location: Natural reserve near Ain Aouda, Morocco; 33.768842°N 6.765084°W
- Status: Active
- Opened: 2004/2006
- Managed by: Abdellatif Hamouchi, Director of the Directorate for the Surveillance of the Territory

Ain Aouda secret prison is a suspected black site, torture and detention centre operated by the Directorate for the Surveillance of the Territory (Direction de la surveillance du territoire, DST), the Moroccan domestic intelligence agency implicated in past and ongoing human rights violations.

During the Arab Spring protests, the inmates of the Temara interrogation centre were transferred to Ain Aouda. The United States reportedly paid the Moroccan state $20 million for the building of the prison.

== See also ==
- Tazmamart
- Temara interrogation centre
