= Ghassan al-Sharbi =

Saudi former Guantanamo Bay detainee

Ghassan Abdallah Ghazi al-Sharbi
- Born: December 28, 1974 (age 51); Jeddah, Saudi Arabia
- Arrested: 2002-03; Faisalabad, Pakistan; Joint force of Pakistani and American security officials
- Detained at: Guantanamo
- ISN: 682
- Charge: War crimes charges against him have been dismissed
- Status: Released
- CSRT Summary: Works related to Summary of Evidence at Wikisource

Ghassan Abdallah Ghazi al-Sharbi (born 28 December 1974) is a Saudi citizen who was held in extrajudicial detention in the United States Guantanamo Bay detention camps, in Cuba. His Guantanamo Internment Serial Number was 682.

Captured in Faisalabad, Pakistan in March 2002, al-Sharbi was transferred to Guantanamo Bay later that year. In 2006, al-Sharbi told a military commission that he was a member of al-Qaeda and proud of his actions against the United States. Serious war crimes charges were dropped against him in October 2008, as it had been found they were based on evidence gained through torture of Abu Zubaydah. Al-Sharbi had a habeas corpus petition which his father had initiated on his behalf; when it reached the court in March 2009, al-Sharbi requested that it be dismissed. He did not want to pursue it.

Al-Sharbi was held at Guantanamo for twenty years.

== Early life and education ==
The US Department of Defense reports that Ghassan al-Sharbi was born on December 28, 1974, in Jeddah, Saudi Arabia. He was sent to the United States for high school and later graduated from Embry-Riddle Aeronautical University in Prescott, Arizona with a degree in electrical engineering.

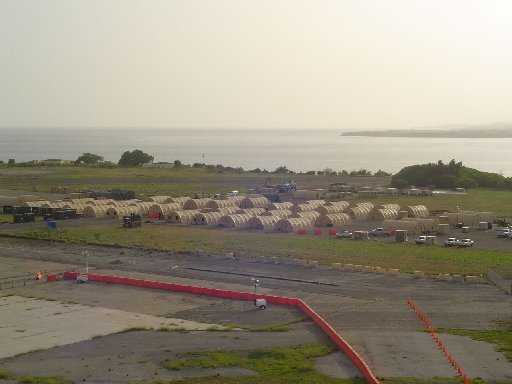
The Bush administration developed a $12 million tent city to hold up to 80 military commissions under a 2006 law.

== Afghanistan ==
Al-Sharbi left the United States for Afghanistan in 2000, leaving his wife and daughter behind.

He was captured in March 2002 by Pakistani forces during a raid at Faisalabad, Pakistan. He was held in Islamabad for two months before being turned over to United States forces.

When he was taken to Bagram Air Base for interrogation in June 2002, he was designated as prisoner #237. According to Chris Mackey, a lead interrogator at the base who wrote a chapter about the Saudi's interrogation in his 2004 memoir, al-Sharbi was designated as prisoner #237 at Bagram. He spoke fluent English and was considered "dismissive and aloof" by the interrogators. He offered the names, addresses and phone numbers of several American classmates, professors and landlords who he said would vouch for his having done nothing wrong. He also stated that he was glad to see the Taliban ruling Afghanistan, quoting statistics that showed a dramatic decrease in crime rates and an increase in new schools built under their government.

Al-Sharbi asked the interrogations chief whether he had read anything by T. E. Lawrence, or From Beirut to Jerusalem. When the interrogator said that he graduated from Fordham University, al-Sharbi said it was a "third-tier school". The interrogator later remarked that al-Sharbi wanted to assert superiority and had a "seeming preoccupation with death". When it was arranged to transfer al-Sharbi to Guantanamo, he calmly told his interrogators that "after a while, the truth would blur for him and that he would just say whatever we wanted to hear just to have the solitude that would come from the end of our questioning".

== Transfer to Guantanamo Bay ==
In 2002, al-Sharbi was transferred to the United States Guantanamo Bay detention camp in Cuba.

In his testimony before his Combatant Status Review Tribunal, held sometime during late 2004–2005, al-Sharbi accepted the classification as "enemy combatant," as well as all 15 allegations against him. When he was dismissed from the room, he chanted, "May God help me fight the infidels or the unfaithful ones."

On November 7, 2005, the United States charged al-Sharbi and four other detainees with war crimes. They were expected to face a trial before a military commission. Al-Sharbi, Jabran Said bin al Qahtani, Binyam Ahmed Muhammad, and Sufyian Barhoumi faced conspiracy to murder charges for being part of an al-Qaeda bomb-making cell. Omar Khadr, 18 years old, faced both murder and conspiracy to murder charges.

Al-Sharbi initially wanted to decline legal representation; a pro bono attorney was arranged by the Center for Constitutional Rights and other organizations when the US had not provided any counsel to the detainees. In 2006, his pro bono attorney, Bob Rachlin, was trying to arrange for al-Sharbi to talk by phone with his parents, hoping they would persuade him to accept Rachlin's legal assistance, which his father had initiated.

On April 27, 2006, al-Sharbi acknowledged membership in al Qaeda before a military commission. He was alleged to have been part of a bomb-making cell. According to David Morgan, a Reuters reporter, his comments included the following:

- "I came here to tell you I did what I did and I'm willing to pay the price."
- "Even if I spend hundreds of years in jail, that would be a matter of honor to me."
- "I fought the United States, I'm going to make it short and easy for you guys: I'm proud of what I did." The hearing was covered by a limited number of reporters. Al-Sharbi said he wanted to represent himself; he "rejected his appointed military lawyer, Navy Lt. William Kuebler, and said he wanted neither a military replacement nor a civilian defender."

In Hamdan v. Rumsfeld (2006), the United States Supreme Court held that the executive branch did not have the authority to set up a separate system of military trials outside the civil and military justice systems, and that the Combatant Status Review Tribunals (CSRT) and military commissions were unconstitutional. That year, Congress passed the Military Commissions Act of 2006, authorizing a separate system for prosecuting enemy combatants and responding to Court-identified issues. The act restricted the detainees from using habeas corpus and federal courts; all pending cases were stayed.

On May 29, 2008, Ghassan Abdullah Ghazi al-Sharbi, Sufyian Barhoumi and Jabran al-Qahtani were charged separately before military commissions authorized under the 2006 act.

On October 21, 2008, Susan J. Crawford, the official in charge of the Office of Military Commissions, announced that charges were dropped against al-Sharbi and four other detainees: Jabran al Qahtani, Sufyian Barhoumi, Binyam Mohamed, and Noor Uthman Muhammed. Carol J. Williams, writing in the Los Angeles Times, reported that all five men had been connected to Abu Zubaydah by his testimony. The CIA has acknowledged that Zubaydah is one of three high-value detainees who were interrogated at length under the technique known as "waterboarding", generally considered a form of torture, before the CIA transferred them to military custody in September 2006 at Guantanamo Bay. Evidence which Zubaydah gave under such coercive interrogation could not be used in court against other suspects.

The men's attorneys expected that the five men would be re-charged within thirty days. They told Williams that: "... prosecutors called the move procedural," and attributed it to the resignation of fellow Prosecutor Darrel Vandeveld. He publicly announced his resignation on ethical grounds.

Williams reported comments by Clive Stafford Smith, legal director of Reprieve, who represents several Guantanamo detainees. He speculated that the Prosecution's dropping of the charges, and plans to subsequently re-file charges was intended to counter and disarm the testimony Vandeveld was expected to offer, that the Prosecution had withheld exculpatory evidence in relation to each of the men.

== Sleep deprivation ==
On August 7, 2008, the Washington Post reported that the Guantanamo guards defied orders to discontinue the illegal practice of arbitrarily moving captives multiples times a day to deprive them of sleep, after it was banned in March 2004. The report stated al-Sharbi was subjected to the "frequent flyer" program from November 2003 to February 2004. It also said that such sleep deprivation was applied widely against numerous detainees, and guards had continued to use it for months after it was banned.

Robert Rachlin, one of his lawyers, stated:

"We have to assume that the frequent flyer program, what its details were, was not designed to strengthen the comfort and resolve of the prisoner. Sleep deprivation is coercive. Of course it troubles me."

The United States Supreme Court decision in Boumediene v. Bush (2008) overturned the Military Commissions Act of 2006, reaffirming detainee rights to use the habeas corpus process and to petition directly in the US courts. Many habeas corpus cases were reinstated, including that for al-Sharbi, which his father had initiated on his behalf.

== Dropped habeas petition ==
On March 10, 2009, US District Court Judge Emmet G. Sullivan dismissed a habeas corpus petition filed on al-Sharbi's behalf. Sullivan dismissed the petition at al-Sharbi's request. The petition had been initiated by his father, who had worked with the Center for Constitutional Rights to gain legal assistance in the United States prior to the appointment of military defense counsels. Al-Sharbi's lawyer Robert Rachlin confirmed that al-Sharbi had consistently declined all legal assistance. He said the detainee had often expressed disdain for the United States process and was "an aspiring martyr".

== Joint Review Task Force ==
When he assumed office in January 2009, President Barack Obama made a number of promises about the future of Guantanamo. He promised the use of torture would cease at the camp. He promised to institute a new review system. That new review system was composed of officials from six departments, where the OARDEC reviews were conducted entirely by the Department of Defense. When it reported back, a year later, the Joint Review Task Force classified some individuals as too dangerous to be transferred from Guantanamo, even though there was no evidence to justify laying charges against them. On April 9, 2013, that document was made public after a Freedom of Information Act request. Ghassan Abdallah Ghazi al-Sharbi was one of the 71 individuals deemed too innocent to charge, but too dangerous to release. Although Obama promised that those deemed too innocent to charge, but too dangerous to release would start to receive reviews from a Periodic Review Board, less than a quarter of men have received a review. Al-Sharbi was approved for transfer on February 4, 2022.

== Release ==
Al-Sharbi was transferred to Saudi Arabia on March 8, 2023.

== See also ==
- Sleep deprivation
