= Sufyian Barhoumi =

Algerian man detained at Guantanamo Bay

Sufyian Barhoumi سفيان برهومي
- Born: July 23 or 28, 1973; Algiers, Algeria
- Detained at: Guantanamo
- ISN: 694
- Charge: War crimes charges against Mr. Barhoumi have been dismissed
- Status: Released

Sufyian ibn Muhammad Barhoumi is an Algerian man who was held in extrajudicial detention in the United States Guantanamo Bay detention camps, in Cuba. The Department of Defense reports that he was born on July 28, 1973, in Algiers, Algeria.

Sufyian Barhoumi arrived at Guantanamo on June 18, 2002, and was held at Guantanamo for nearly 20 years.

Barhoumi is among the small number of captives who faced charges before a Guantanamo military commission.

Sufyian Barhoumi and Abdul Latif Nasir tried to file emergency requests to be transferred from Guantanamo in the final days of Barack Obama's Presidency.

== Official status reviews ==
Originally the Bush Presidency asserted that captives apprehended in the "war on terror" were not covered by the Geneva Conventions, and could be held indefinitely, without charge, and without an open and transparent review of the justifications for their detention. In 2004 the United States Supreme Court ruled, in Rasul v. Bush, that Guantanamo captives were entitled to being informed of the allegations justifying their detention, and were entitled to try to refute them.

=== Office for the Administrative Review of Detained Enemy Combatants ===
Following the Supreme Court's ruling the Department of Defense set up the Office for the Administrative Review of Detained Enemy Combatants.

Scholars at the Brookings Institution, led by Benjamin Wittes, listed the captives still held in Guantanamo in December 2008, according to whether their detention was justified by certain common allegations:

- Sufiyan Barhoumi was listed as one of the captives who had faced charges before a military commission.
- Sufiyan Barhoumi was listed as one of the captives who had been charged before a Guantanamo military commission, and had subsequently had the charges dropped.
- Sufiyan Barhoumi was listed as one of the captives who "The military alleges ... are members of Al Qaeda."
- Sufiyan Barhoumi was listed as one of the captives who "The military alleges ... took military or terrorist training in Afghanistan."
- Sufiyan Barhoumi was listed as one of the captives who "The military alleges that the following detainees were captured under circumstances that strongly suggest belligerency."
- Sufiyan Barhoumi was listed as one of the captives who was an "al Qaeda operative".
- Sufiyan Barhoumi was listed as one of the captives "who have been charged before military commissions and are alleged Al Qaeda operatives."
- Sufiyan Barhoumi was listed as one of the captives who "deny affiliation with Al Qaeda or the Taliban yet admit facts that, under the broad authority the laws of war give armed parties to detain the enemy, offer the government ample legal justification for its detention decisions."
- Sufiyan Barhoumi was listed as one of the captives who had admitted "to training at Al Qaeda or Taliban camps".

=== Habeas corpus petition ===
Barhoumi had a writ of habeas corpus filed on his behalf, Civil Action No. 05-cv-1506, by pro bono attorneys from Holland & Hart LLP.

On September 24, 2009, Carol Rosenberg, writing in the Miami Herald, reported that U.S. District Court Judge Rosemary Collyer had ruled that the USA could continue to hold Sufiyan in Guantanamo. While the ruling was announced, its text remained classified.

His case was appealed before a panel of judges, who confirmed Collyer's decision on June 10, 2010.

=== Formerly secret Joint Task Force Guantanamo assessment ===
On April 25, 2011, whistleblower organization WikiLeaks published formerly secret assessments drafted by Joint Task Force Guantanamo analysts. A five-page JTF-GTMO assessment was drafted on June 11, 2004. It was signed by camp commandant Jay W. Hood, who recommended continued detention.

=== Joint Review Task Force ===
When he assumed office in January 2009, President Barack Obama made a number of promises about the future of Guantanamo. He promised to close the camp within a year of his inauguration. He promised the use of torture would cease at the camp. He promised to institute a new review system. That new review system was composed of officials from six departments, where the OARDEC reviews were conducted entirely by the Department of Defense. When it reported back, a year later, the Joint Review Task Force classified some individuals as too dangerous to be transferred from Guantanamo, even though there was no evidence to justify laying charges against them. On April 9, 2013, that document was made public after a Freedom of Information Act request. Sufiyan Barhoumi was one of the 71 individuals deemed too innocent to charge, but too dangerous to release.

== Charges before a military commission ==
On July 6, 2004, United States President Bush ordered that Sufyian Barhoumi be charged before a military commission. The appointing authority approved the charges against Sufyian on 4 November 2005. Barhoumi faced the charge of "Conspiracy". His five-page charge sheet listed thirteen general allegations, that were essentially identical to those of Jabran Said bin al Qahtani, Binyam Ahmed Muhammad, and Ghassan Abdullah al Sharbi. Sufyian Barhoumi, Jabran Said bin al Qahtani, Ghassan Abdullah al Sharbi, and two other captives, Binyam Ahmed Muhammad, and Omar Khadr had their charges confirmed on the same day as Barhoumi. Sufyian Barhoumi, Jabran Said bin al Qahtani, Ghassan Abdullah al Sharbi, and Binyam Ahmed Muhammad all faced conspiracy charges. Omar Khadr faced both murder and conspiracy to murder charges.

In July 2006, after considering Hamdan v. Rumsfeld, the United States Supreme Court ruled that the President lacked the Constitutional Authority to order Military Commissions. The Supreme Court ruled that only the United States Congress had the authority to order Military Commissions. So the charges against all ten men were dropped.

On May 29, 2008, Barhoumi, Jabran al-Qathani and Ghassan Abdullah al-Sharbi were charged before the Congressionally authorized military commissions.

On October 21, 2008, Susan J. Crawford the official in charge of the Office of Military Commissions announced charges were dropped against Barhoumi. Carol J. Williams, writing in the Los Angeles Times reports that all five men had been connected by Abu Zubaydah—one of the three captives the CIA has acknowledged was interrogated using the controversial technique known as "waterboarding".

Williams quoted the men's attorneys, who anticipated the five men would be re-charged in thirty days. They told Williams that: "... prosecutors called the move procedural", and attributed it to the resignation of fellow Prosecutor Darrel Vandeveld, who resigned on ethical grounds. Williams reported that Clive Stafford Smith speculated that the Prosecution's dropping of the charges, and plans to subsequently re-file charges later was intended to counter and disarm the testimony Vandeveld was anticipated to offer, that the Prosecution had withheld exculpatory evidence.

Barhoumi has not been re-charged. Jess Bravin, writing in the Wall Street Journal, reported that, by 2013, Barhoumi had decided he would plead guilty, to any charge, because he saw a plea bargain as a way to win himself a fixed release date to look forward to. Barhoumi was to have been charged with "providing material support for terrorism." But appeals court judges had overturned the convictions of other men who pled guilty to that charge.

Bravin said that Barhoumi had come close to agreeing to a plea bargain in 2009, that would have imposed a sentence of 20 years, except he wanted credit for the eight years he had already served.

== Status during the Donald Trump administration ==
Observers noted that President Barack Obama's administration made a push to transfer as many individuals from Guantanamo, as possible, during his last year. The Washington Post reported that Sufyian Barhoumi was one of the five individuals who had been cleared for release, who remained in Guantanamo when Donald Trump was inaugurated in 2017.

== Release ==
Barhoumi was transferred to Algeria on April 2, 2022.
