= Dar Es Salam Palace, Rabat =

Residence of the King of Morocco

The Dar Es Salam Palace is a residence of the King of Morocco in Rabat, Morocco. It is specifically associated with the memory of Morocco's first king Mohammed V who appreciated its seclusion and made it a principal place of living. The palace was the venue of the meeting of North African leaders that was held when Mohammed V's son Hassan II succeeded his late father in 1961. It has also been used as the private residence of Hassan II's son and successor Mohammed VI.

The palace's southern grounds were subsequently developed to create the Royal Golf Dar Es Salam, opened in 1971, and the adjacent equestrian center and seat of the Royal Moroccan Equestrian Federation, complemented in 2013 by the Institut National du Cheval. A luxury Ritz-Carlton Hotel opened near the golf course in early 2023. The central campus of Morocco's General Directorate for Territorial Surveillance lies to the palace's immediate southwest, and its Temara interrogation centre a bit further west. The palace's entrance is at the western end of the Route Dar Essalam.

== See also ==
- Royal Palace of Rabat
- List of Moroccan royal residences
