= We Are Not Ghouls =

- Directed by: Chris James Thompson
- Produced by: Andrew Swant, Jessica Farrell
- Starring: Yvonne Bradley, Clive Stafford Smith, Darrel Vandeveld, Stephen Grey
- Cinematography: Michael T. Vollmann, Erik Ljung, Ryan Reeve, Rubin Whitmore II, Quinn Hester
- Edited by: Chris James Thompson
- Music by: Will Van Boldrik
- Production company: Good Credit Productions
- Distributed by: Gravitas Ventures
- Release dates: March 12, 2022 (SXSW); February 28, 2023 (United States)
- Running time: 92 minutes
- Country: United States
- Language: English

We Are Not Ghouls is a 2022 documentary film about JAG attorney Lieutenant-Colonel Yvonne Bradley's work to free Guantanamo Bay detainee Binyam Mohamed. The film was directed by Chris James Thompson and is based on the book The Guantánamo Lawyers: Inside a Prison Outside the Law. The documentary premiered at the 2022 SXSW Film Festival, where it won the Audience Award in the Documentary Spotlight category. The film then played at the 2022 DOC NYC Film Festival before being released nationally in February 2023.

== Synopsis ==
US Air Force JAG attorney Yvonne Bradley volunteered to defend a man named Binyam Mohamed who was facing a death penalty case at Guantanamo Bay in 2005. Believing the detainees at Guantanamo were “the worst of the worst” in the war on terror, Yvonne's world was turned upside down as she arrived in Cuba and began to untangle an unimaginable case. Spending the next four years battling to uncover the truth, Yvonne's is a captivating story of taking responsibility in the face of corruption at the highest levels of power, and the dangers of choosing to stand up for what you believe in.

== Interviewees ==
- Yvonne Bradley - US Air Force JAG
- Clive Stafford Smith - Human Rights Attorney
- Darrel Vandeveld - US Army Reserve JAG
- Stephen Grey - Investigative Journalist
- Janet Hamlin - Illustrator

== Release ==
The film was acquired for distribution by Gravitas Ventures and was released in February 2023 on Amazon Prime Video, iTunes, Google Play, and others.
