= Bisher Amin Khalil al-Rawi =

Iraqi citizen (born 1960)

Bisher Amin Khalil Al-Rawi
- Born: 23 December 1960 (age 65); Baghdad, Iraq
- Detained at: Guantanamo
- ISN: 906
- Charge(s): no charge, held in extrajudicial detention

Bisher Amin Khalil Al-Rawi (Arabic: بشر أمين خليل الراوي, Bišr Amīn Ḫalīl ar-Rawī) (born 23 December 1960) is an Iraqi citizen, who became a resident of the United Kingdom in the 1980s. Arrested in Gambia on a business trip in November 2002, he was transferred to United States military custody and held until 30 March 2007, in extrajudicial detention in the United States Guantanamo Bay detention camp at its naval base in Cuba. His Guantanamo Internment Serial Number was 906. The Department of Defense reports that Al Rawi was born on 23 December 1960, in Baghdad, Iraq.

Bisher contends that he was on a business trip to Gambia with his friend and business associate, Jamil al-Banna, when he was arrested by the Gambian National Intelligence Agency on arrival at Banjul airport on 8 November 2002. He was turned over to US authorities, who transported him to Bagram Airbase. In detention, he helped Moazzam Begg, another British citizen, prepare meals for detainees. From there, they were shipped to Guantanamo Bay. The US contends that Bisher was held under suspicion of links with al-Qaeda. He was ultimately released without charges.

== Early life ==
Bisher Amin Khalil al-Rawi was born in Baghdad, Iraq. He emigrated to the United Kingdom and was given legal resident status. He lived in West London, married and had a family.

== Cooperation with MI5 in London ==
Following the 11 September 2001, attacks in the United States, Bisher was contacted by MI5 officers. He decided to cooperate with them in answering questions about the Muslim community in London, in the belief that he could help provide insight and ease tensions between the Muslims and other Britons.

== Arrest in Gambia ==
Bisher al-Rawi and Jamil al-Banna flew to Gambia to meet a shipment of machine parts to be used to set up an edible oil factory, which was owned by Bisher's brother. The two men, along with two others, were taken into custody by the Gambian National Intelligence Agency on their arrival at Banjul airport in Gambia on 8 November 2002, purportedly on suspicion of alleged links to al-Qaeda and advice from British security authorities. At first the two men were under a kind of unofficial house arrest. They were not formally charged with any crimes under Gambian law. They were told that they would be released when their machinery had been checked to make sure it was not something that could be used for terrorism.

They were not detained in a Gambian jail, but rather in a CIA "snatch team" safe house, which was provided by American security officials. They were guarded by Gambians and interrogated by American agents.

In late December 2002, the CIA decided to transport them from Gambia. The "black team" that arrived to escort them wore black uniforms, and their faces were covered by black balaclavas. They cut the clothes from the detainees' bodies and bound them for transportation. The two men were illegally "rendered" to Bagram Air Base in Afghanistan where they were imprisoned underground in total darkness for weeks.

In March 2003, Jamil al-Banna and Bisher al-Rawi were transferred to United States military custody at Guantanamo Bay detention camp.

== Combatant Status Review Tribunal ==
Following the United States Supreme Court decision in Rasul v. Bush (2004) that detainees had the right to habeas corpus challenge of their detention before an impartial tribunal, the Bush administration quickly set up a system of Combatant Status Review Tribunals to review each detainee's case, to be followed when warranted by military commissions to try prisoners on charges. These were intended to replace detainees' going to federal court for habeas corpus reviews.

Most of the CSRTs took place from the fall of 2004 through early 2005. They did not follow the rules for the use of hearsay and other evidence from the federal or military justice systems.

Al Rawi was among the 60% of prisoners who participated in the tribunal hearings. A Summary of Evidence memo was prepared for the tribunal of each detainee. The allegations were sometimes based on hearsay or classified evidence which the detainee was not allowed to see. Detainees had no legal counsel, only military-assigned Personal Representatives.

Al Rawi's Summary of Evidence made the following allegations as justification for his detention as an enemy combatant:

- The detainee is associated with al Qaida:
- The detainee provided harbour in London, United Kingdom to a known al-Qaeda fugitive named Abu Qatada.
- The detainee assisted Abu Qatada by locating an apartment where the fugitive hid from British authorities.
- Abu Qatada has strong links to senior al-Qaeda operatives and facilitated the travel of individuals to an al Qaida guesthouse located in Pakistan.
- Abu Qatada is a known al-Qaeda operative who was arrested in the United Kingdom as a danger to national security.
- In addition to helping Abu Qatada evade British authorities, al-Rawi transferred funds between branches of the Arab Bank at Abu Qatada's direction in 1999 or 2000.
- In November 2002, the detainee was arrested in Gambia after arriving from the United Kingdom and was later transferred to US custody at its airbase in Bagram, Afghanistan.

=== Requested witnesses ===
Al Rawi requested seven witnesses for his tribunal:

Alex, Matthew, Martin	Description totally redacted. Note: These were MI5 agents with whom he had consulted over time in London. He did not know their full or real names.
detainee redacted	"He can testify not arrested in Gambia, there were specifically told not arrested. From day 1 to last day in Gambia they were not given any legal status. American officials were running the show and interrogating them."
his brother (name redacted – Abdul-Wahab)	"...can testify that they were not arrested because he was with them and let go."
Abdula Janudi	Another traveling companion, who was also released, who can testify that he was not arrested.
Gareth Peirce	His lawyer, who will testify that what he is accused of is not illegal in Britain.

The Tribunal's president had initially ruled that witnesses were irrelevant. During the course of Al Rawi's testimony, the President decided that the testimony of Alex, Matthew and Martin was relevant after all. He directed the Tribunal's Recorder to locate them. The Tribunal's Recorder was unable to locate them. The reason the President changed his mind is redacted.

=== Testimony ===
Al Rawi's testimony contained many redacted sections.

== MI5 informant ==
In 2006, the Justice Jed Rakoff of the US District Court for the District of Columbia filed a court order forcing the Department of Defense to release documents from detainees' Combatant Status Review Tribunals. Based on this, media reported that Bisher and some other detainees who were legal residents of Britain had served as informants for Britain's counter-intelligence agency, MI5, but were being held at Guantanamo Bay. By this time, all but one of the British citizens at Guantanamo had been repatriated. The British government started to press the United States for release of British legal residents as well.

== Comfort items ==
One of Al Rawi's lawyer's, Brent Mickum, described how comfort items were withheld from Al Rawi. Al Rawi's toilet paper ration was fifteen sheets a day. However, when he tried using sheets of toilet paper to block out the 24 hours of light in his cell, his toilet paper ration was withheld. When Al Rawi was subject to extreme temperatures and was kept in a very cold cell, his prayer rug was confiscated when he tried to use it as a blanket.

== Repatriation request ==
The Guardian reported, on 20 April 2006, that the British Foreign Office had formally requested that Bisher al-Rawi be released to return to Britain.

On 3 October 2006, The Times reported that the United States had agreed, in confidential talks in June 2006, to return all nine of the British residents held in Guantanamo—but only under stringent conditions. The US stipulated that Britain should undertake round-the-clock surveillance of the detainees, which it considered too expensive to undertake, as well as unnecessary. According to The Times, "Although the men are accused of terrorist involvement, British officials say that there is not enough evidence to justify the level of surveillance demanded by the US and that the strict conditions stipulated are unworkable and unnecessary." The Times reported that the UK government was most interested in the return of Bisher, since he had cooperated with MI5.

== Release ==
On 29 March 2007, UK Foreign Secretary Margaret Beckett announced that the UK Government had negotiated al-Rawi's return from Guantanamo. According to the Associated Press, Beckett issued a statement to Parliament which said:

We have now agreed with the U.S. authorities that Mr. al-Rawi will be returned to the U.K. shortly, as soon as the practical arrangements have been made. This decision follows extensive discussions to address the security implications of Mr. Al-Rawi's return.

Beckett's announcement didn't say anything about al-Rawi's travelling companion Jamil al-Banna, or the other remaining former UK residents who remain held in Guantanamo. Nor did she announce an exact return date. Al-Rawi's home, in Britain, is in Beckett's constituency.

Al-Rawi had been released by 3 April 2007. According to the New Zealand Herald he said:

I am delighted to be back in England, with my family. After four years in Guantanamo Bay, my nightmare is finally at an end. As happy as I am to be home though, leaving my best friend, Jamil el-Banna, behind in Guantanamo Bay makes my freedom bitter-sweet. Jamil was arrested with me in the Gambia on exactly the same unfounded allegations, yet he is still a prisoner...

== Civil suit ==
On 1 August 2007, Bisher al Rawi joined a civil suit filed under the United States' Alien Tort Statute, with the assistance of the American Civil Liberties Union (ACLU). Al Rawi was joined with four other men, Abou Elkassim Britel, Binyam Mohamed, Ahmed Agiza, and Mohamed Farag Ahmad Bashmilah, in suing Jeppesen Dataplan, a Boeing subsidiary which had arranged the extraordinary rendition flights by which the men had been illegally transported.
