= Abou Elkassim Britel =

Italian aeronautic engineer

- Born: 1967 (age 58–59)
- Arrested: February 2002; Pakistan
- Citizenship: Italy
- Detained at: Morocco

Abou Elkassim Britel is a citizen of Italy who was transported through the United States' controversial extraordinary rendition program. Abou was first apprehended in Pakistan, in February 2002, who handed him over to American authorities. Abou was flown to Morocco in May 2002, and remained in extrajudicial detention there until April 2011. Under torture, Abou confessed to "terrorist activities".

Abou joined with four other men, Bisher Al-Rawi, Binyam Mohamed, Ahmed Agiza and Mohamed Farag Ahmad Bashmilah, to sue the Jeppesen Dataplan a company with a contract with the US government to run the fleet of jets used in the extraordinary rendition program. Marc Ambinder, commenting in the Atlantic magazine explained the United States President Barack Obama was opposing the men's discovery, on the grounds doing so would expose techniques that would put the USA's national security at risk.

In 2014, Abou started a petition requesting an apology from the American government for the torture he suffered during his captivity.
