= Mohamed Farag Bashmilah =

CIA torture victim

Mohamed Farag Ahmad Bashmilah
- Born: 1968 (age 57–58)
- Arrested: 2003-10; Jordan; Jordanian security officials
- Released: 2005-05; Yemen
- Citizenship: Yemen
- Detained at: CIA black sites
- Charge: extrajudicial detention

Mohamed Farag Ahmad Bashmilah (born 1968) is a citizen of Yemen who is reported to have been a subject of the United States' controversial extraordinary rendition program. The American Civil Liberties Union states that he was apprehended by the Jordanian General Intelligence Department and tortured and interrogated for days, in Jordan, where he was: "turned over to agents who beat, kicked, diapered, hooded and handcuffed him before secretly transporting him to the U.S. Air Force base in Bagram, Afghanistan." They report that Bashmillah was held in extrajudicial detention in the United States' Bagram Theater Internment Facility, and the CIA network of black sites.

They report that he was repatriated to Yemen in May 2005, where he underwent a further nine months of detention. Bashmilah's case had been uncovered by Amnesty International in early 2005, and they were the only organization to have access to him in prison in Yemen, where they first visited him in June 2005, and on other occasions throughout his incarceration there. His story was first made public by Amnesty in August 2005, and a full report was issued in November 2005.

Amnesty International also interviewed and reported on the cases of two other Yemenis, Salah Nasir Salim 'Ali and Muhammad Abdullah Salah al-Assad, who were held in the CIA black site with Bashmilah and who were returned with him to Yemen in May 2005. The three are notable because they were the first to describe CIA black site detention in detail. Although the CIA's network of black sites is estimated to have held 150 captives, most of their identities remain unknown.

Bashmilah was added to a civil action the ACLU is aiding, under the United States' Alien Torts Statute.

== Capture ==
Bashimilah travelled from Indonesia to Jordan with his wife in October 2003 and was arrested on October 21, 2003, after telling Jordanian officials that in 2000 he had been to Afghanistan. Bashimilah was subsequently beaten and threatened by the General Intelligence Department until he finally agreed several days later to sign a confession without ever reading it. On the morning of October 26, he was transferred to the CIA, which chained and hooded him, and then flew him to Kabul, Afghanistan.

== American custody ==
In Bagram Bashmilah was locked in a 6.5 by 10 foot cell without windows or heat. During his first month of captivity his legs were shackled, he was subjected to loud music all day and night, and he was made to raise his hand every half-hour to stop him from falling asleep. This routine continued minus the music for another two months, by which time Bashmilah attempted suicide several times. He was regularly interrogated.

In late April, estimated April 24, 2004, Bashmilah was examined by a doctor, moved with other prisoners to an airport, and flown to an unknown location, where he received another medical examination and placed naked in a new cell, where he endured constant white noise. Around September 2004, the CIA decided that Bashmilah was not a member of al-Qaeda and he was given better living conditions, including a new cell, weekly shower, and books to read. His interrogations stopped and he spoke with psychiatrists.

== Release ==
Bashmilah was released on May 5, 2005, into Yemeni custody after being flown from the unknown location for 6 to 7 hours. He remained in prison in Yemen until he was released on March 27, 2006. In December 2007, he granted an interview with Salon. His first English broadcast interview was in June 2006, for the BBC Newsnight program.

== Civil suit ==
On August 1, 2007. Bashmilah joined a civil suit filed under the United States' Alien Tort Statute, with the assistance of the American Civil Liberties Union. Al Rawi was joined with four other men, Bisher Al-Rawi, Abou Elkassim Britel Binyam Mohamed, and Ahmed Agiza.

== Senate Intelligence Committee report of CIA torture ==
On December 9, 2014, the United States Senate Intelligence Committee published a 600-page unclassified summary of a 6,000 page secret report of the CIA's use of torture. Scott Shane, writing in the New York Times, wrote that the Committee's report identified Bashmillah was one of 26 individuals whom the CIA had tortured without authorization. The Report further identified Bashmillah as one of the individuals whose detention was "wrongful".

Shane wrote that Bashmillah's lawyer, Meg Satterthwaite, had been attempting, without success, to get the US government to acknowledge it had held Bashmillah.

Satterthwaite told Shane how Bashmillah had been exposed to total darkness, sensory deprivation, freezing cold temperatures, and how he had been subject to a constant bombardment with deafening music. Bashmillah's experienced conditions so horrific he tried to kill himself three times.

== See also ==
- Bagram torture and prisoner abuse
