= Yunus Rahmatullah =

Pakistani held on terrorist charges (born 1982)

- Born: 27 October 1982 (age 44)
- Arrested: 2004; Iraq; UK forces
- Citizenship: Pakistani
- Detained at: Bagram Theater Internment Facility
- Other name: Salahuddin
- ISN: 1433
- Status: Writ of habeas corpus granted, UK ordered to obtain his freedom until 18 January 2012 Released without charge from US detention in May 2014.

Yunus Rahmatullah (born 27 October 1982) is a citizen of Pakistan arrested in Iraq by British forces in 2004 and then rendered to a US prison in Afghanistan where he was secretly held without charge or trial for at least seven years.

The legal charity Reprieve said: "Rahmatullah had been unable to contact his family or a lawyer and was in a legal black hole".

Rahmatullah's mother, Fatima, said: "Our family was shocked when we learnt that the British Government might have been behind Yunus's disappearance. My plea to the British Government is simple: Tell me whether you picked my son Yunus up, and gave him to the Americans. It is my basic right as a mother to know whether my son is still alive. I cannot bear further suspense. You have the power to help me recover my disappeared child."

== Request for release in Pakistani court ==
After seven years Rahmatullah's family asked the Lahore Court in Pakistan to secure his immediate release. Reprieve's Legal Director Cori Crider said: "We hope that tomorrow the families of seven Pakistanis languishing in Bagram may finally get some answers from Lahore's High Court. After years of grief these mothers deserve to know how and why their sons - including an innocent 14-year-old kid - have not been brought home by the government of Pakistan."

== Request for release in UK courts ==
The Court of Appeal by the Master of the Rolls, Lord Neuberger, Lord Justice Maurice Kay and Lord Justice Sullivan granted a writ of habeas corpus to Rahmatullah on 14 December 2011. They determined that because he was captured in Iraq by British Forces the UK justice system had standing to rule on his detention. Lord David Neuberger, the senior judge on the three-judge panel, said there was:

a substantial case for saying that the UK government is under an international legal obligation to demand the return of the applicant, and the US government is bound to accede to such an [sic] request.

The Court of Appeal agreed Rahmatullah's detention was "unlawful" and ordered Britain to pursue his release until 18 January 2012.
