= Ahmed Boukhari =

Moroccan secret service agent (1938–2025)

- أحمد البوخاري
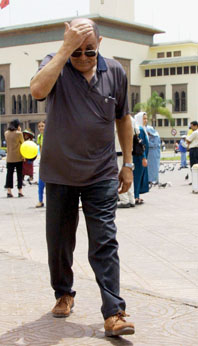
- Boukhari pictured in Casablanca in 2004
- Born: 1938; Safi, French protectorate in Morocco
- Died: 16 February 2025 (aged 86); Casablanca, Morocco
- Occupations: Author, secret agent
- Employer: leader Cab-1 of DST (formerly)
- Known for: was One of the last surviving possible witnesses of the Benbarka Affair

Ahmed al-Boukhari (Arabic: أحمد البوخاري; 1938 – 16 February 2025) was a Moroccan agent of Cab-1, the political cell of the DST (the Moroccan internal secret service). He claimed to have taken part in the operation that orchestrated the abduction and murder of Mehdi Ben Barka, and was as such one of the last surviving possible witnesses in the Benbarka Affair.

== Ben Barka Affair ==
Although he was not present at the crime scene, he had to process all the information on the operation. He claimed that CIA agents were involved, a certain Colonel Martin. Boukhari claimed in his confessions that Ben Barka's body was transported secretly to Morocco and his corpse was dissolved in a bath of acid. However, pro-government newspapers in Morocco claimed that Boukhari was a fraud and a liar. The movie "J'ai vu tuer Ben Barka" ("I saw Ben Barka being killed") was based partly on this book.

== Publications ==
Boukhari authored two books, one about the Ben Barka affair, entitled Le Secret and the other Raisons d'état (published in 2005), in which he recounts the operations of the DST from the 1960s to the 1980s during the repression of various dissident movements, mainly from the socialist left. He remains the only insider who has ever published anything about the DST.

=== Arrest, trial and harassment by authorities ===
Because of his revelations, Boukhari had many problems with Morocco's justice system, including defamation lawsuits by former employees of the DST and the Moroccan Ministry of the Interior, whom he mentioned by name in his book, as well as other common affairs such as dishonoured cheques, which were claimed to be used against him in order to sentence him in a non-political affair.

The Moroccan authorities refused to issue a passport for Boukhari, which he requested in 2001 in order to be able to testify in France before the judge investigating the Ben Barka disappearance. After a lawsuit in the administrative court, Boukhari was finally granted a passport in early 2006.

== Death ==
Boukhari died after a long illness at a clinic in Casablanca, on 16 February 2025, at the age of 86.
