= Royal Moroccan Equestrian Federation =

Moroccan sports organization

Royal Moroccan Equestrian Federation (Fédération Royale Marocaine des Sports Équestres, FRMSE) is the governing body of equestrian sports located at the Dar Es Salam facility in Rabat, Morocco. It has been an affiliated member of the International Equestrian Federation (FEI) since 1958. The federation oversees equestrian sporting which includes horse racing, dressage, jumping, and the traditional equestrian sport of fantasia. Started in 1956, the federation was created under the Moroccan Ministry for Youth and Sports.

The federation sponsors large events in collaboration with the International Equestrian Federation such as the Royal Morocco Tour for jumping, which draws competitors from North Africa and Europe. It also is one of the main sponsors, along with its partner, Société Royale d’Encouragement du Cheval (SOREC), of the Salon du Cheval held annually in El Jadida, Morocco.

In 1999, Princess Lalla Amina of Morocco, aunt to King Mohammed VI was appointed president of the federation. Upon her death in 2012, Sharif Moulay Abdellah Alaoui, cousin to the king was appointed as the current president and patron. In 2018, the federation organized the Nations Cup competition in jumping qualifying Morocco for the 2020 Olympic Games. In February 2019, Princes Harry and Megan Markle visited the federation on their official royal tour of the country.

== See also ==
- Dar Es Salam Palace, Rabat
