= Moira Modzelewski =

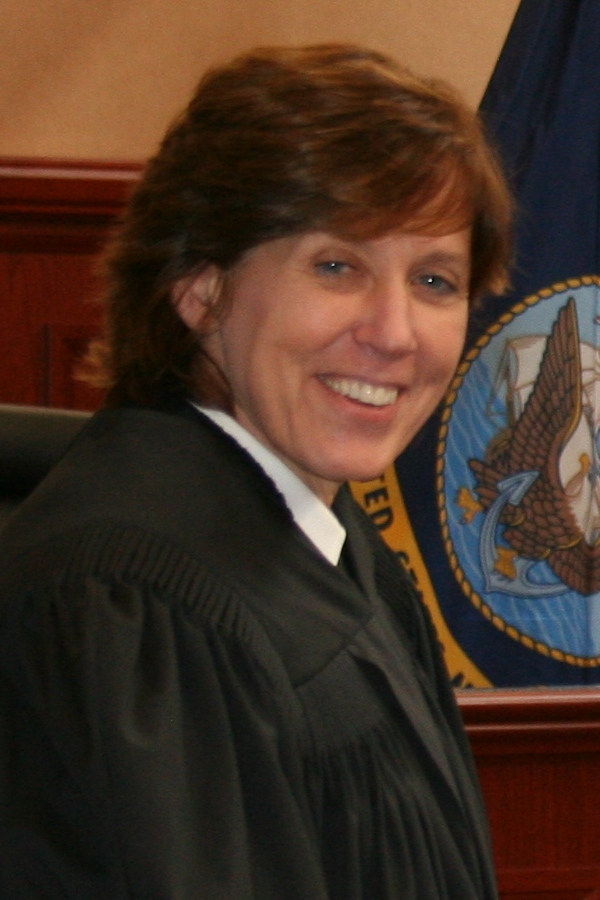
- Moira Modzelewski in 2013
- Born: Moira Lee Dempsey; 30 May 1958 (age 68); Agana, Guam
- Education: University of Virginia (BA, JD); Naval Justice School
- Occupations: lawyer, Captain (USN)
- Known for: Presiding over a Guantanamo military commission
- Spouse: Stephen Anthony Modzelewski Jr. (m. 1989)
- Children: 4

Moira Dempsey Modzelewski (born 30 May 1958) is an American lawyer and former captain in the United States Navy. Until her retirement in 2018, she served as Chief Judge of the Navy and one of four assistant judge advocates general. Modzelewski is notable for her appointment to serve as the Presiding Officer over Noor Uthman Muhammaed's Guantanamo military commission.

== Education ==
education
B.A.	1980	University of Virginia	Chinese Studies
J.D.	1985	University of Virginia	Law
	1985	Naval Justice School	Law

== Teaching career ==
Modzelewski taught English at Szechuan University after earning her bachelor's degree, in 1980.

In 1989 she was an assistant professor at the United States Naval Academy and from 1995–96, she opened the detachment of the Naval Justice School in Norfolk.

== Legal career ==
Modzelewski has served a lawyer or administrator of legal services in over a half dozen posts with the U.S. Navy.

In 2009 she presided over the courts-martial of Navy SEALs from SEAL Team 10 who were charged with beating an Iraqi captive.

She was subsequently appointed to serve as a presiding officer in Guantanamo. In April 2010 she predicted she would require a year to review the secret evidence against Noor Uthman Muhammaed.

Modzelewski joined the Navy-Marine Corps Court of Criminal Appeals in 2011 and became its Chief Judge on 6 August 2013. She was appointed Chief Judge of the Navy after the retirement of Christian L. Reismeier on 1 July 2015.

Retiring from active duty in on 12 July 2018, she was succeeded as Chief Judge of the Navy by Charles N. Purnell II.

== Personal ==
Modzelewski is the daughter of Navy physician John Joseph "Jack" Dempsey (26 June 1925 – 1 August 2004) and retired Navy nurse Joan Louise Barron Dempsey (9 March 1926 – 20 January 2001). She has three sisters and one brother.

Modzelewski is married to retired Navy officer Stephen Anthony Modzelewski Jr. They were married on 7 January 1989 in Norfolk, Virginia. The couple have three sons and one daughter.
