= General Directorate for Territorial Surveillance =

Internal intelligence agency of Morocco

Coordinates: 33.935027°N 6.863535°W

General Directorate of Territorial Surveillance
- المديرية العامة لمراقبة التراب الوطني ⵜⴰⵎⵀⵍⴰ ⵜⴰⵎⴰⵜⴰⵢⵜ ⵏ ⵓⵎⴰⵜⵔ ⵏ ⵡⴰⴽⴰⵍ ⴰⵏⴰⵎⵓⵔ; Direction Général de Surveillance du Térritoire
- Seal of the General Directorate for Territorial Surveillance

Agency overview
- Formed: 12 January 1973; 53 years ago
- Jurisdiction: Government of Morocco
- Headquarters: Temara, Morocco
- Employees: 9,000 (2019 estimate)
- Annual budget: 1,1 billion dirhams (2016)
- Minister responsible: Abdelouafi Laftit, Minister of the Interior
- Agency executive: Abdellatif Hammouchi, Director
- Parent agency: Ministry of Interior

Footnotes
- Building details
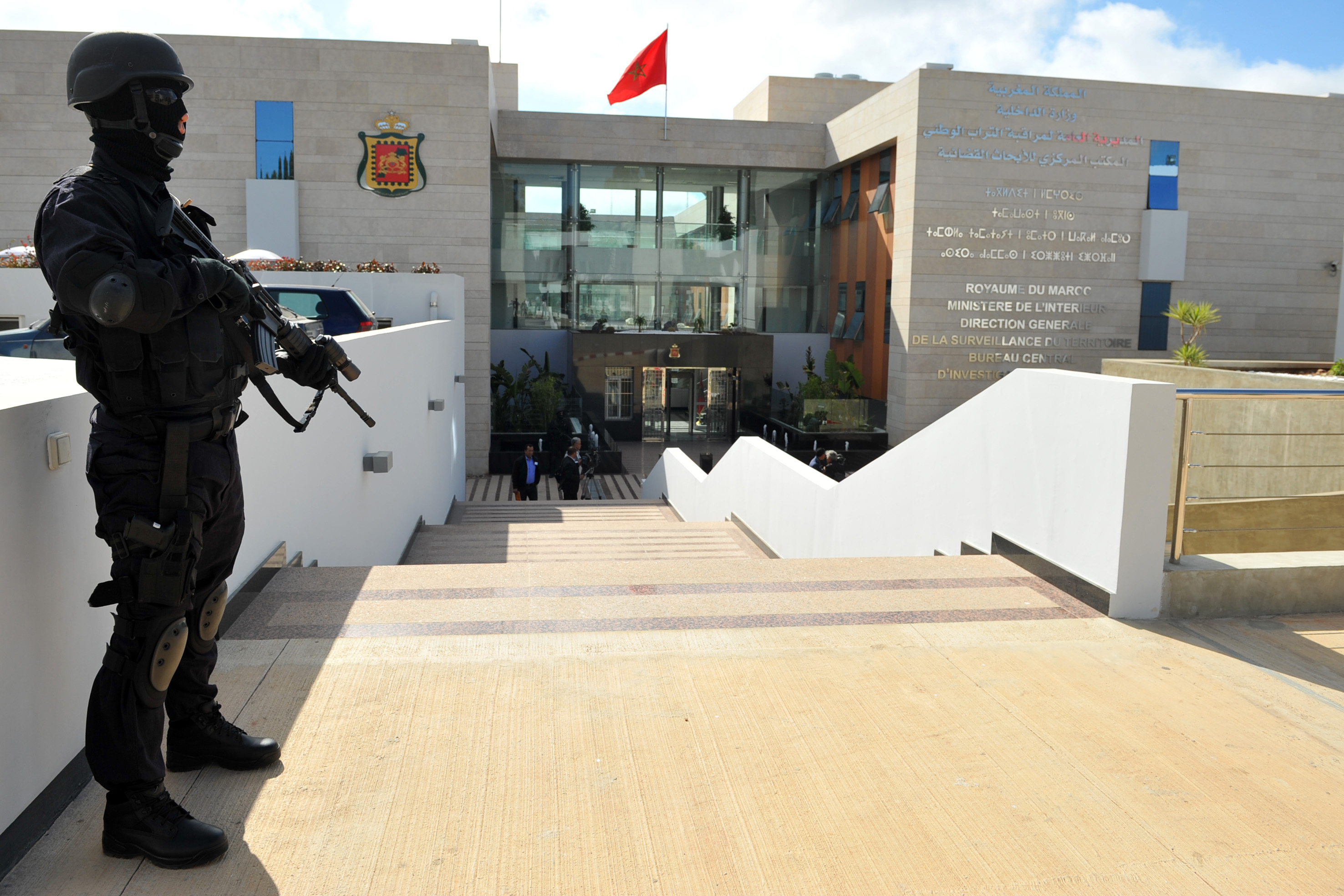
- Headquarters of the General Directorate for Territorial Surveillance's Central Bureau for Judiciary Investigations in Salé

The General Directorate for Territorial Surveillance (Note: Arabic: المديرية العامة لمراقبة التراب الوطني; Tamazight: ⵜⴰⵎⵀⵍⴰ ⵜⴰⵎⴰⵜⴰⵢⵜ ⵏ ⵓⵎⴰⵜⵔ ⵏ ⵡⴰⴽⴰⵍ ⴰⵏⴰⵎⵓⵔ; French: Direction Général de Surveillance du Térritoire) (DGST) is the civilian domestic intelligence service of Morocco. It is tasked with the monitoring and anticipation of potentially subversive domestic activities.

Since 2005, the DGST is led by Abdellatif Hammouchi, who also runs the country's national police force, the Sûreté Nationale (DGSN).

The DGST was previously known as the Direction de la Surveillance du Territoire (DST).

== Organizational structure ==
The DGST is under the administrative supervision of the Ministry of Interior and specializes in counter-espionage, counter-terrorism, and protection of economic and scientific assets. It has a number of central services, led by the Cabinet of the Director-General, alongside a number of territorial brigades which constitute local representations of the DGST across the country and within some government departments.

According to El Confidencial, the Cabinet of the Director-General supervises five different cabinets: the Directorate of General Intelligence (DRS), the Directorate for Combatting Terrorism (DLCT), the Directorate of Administrative and Financial Affairs (DAFF), the Human Resources Department (DRH), and the most important, the Directorate of Operations (DOP). The DGST also has a special forces unit, the Rapid Intervention Group (GIR), which intervenes in counter-terrorism raids.

=== Directorate for Combatting Terrorism (DLCT) ===
==== Central Bureau of Judicial Investigations (BCIJ) ====
The Central Bureau of Judicial Investigations (French: Bureau central d'investigations judiciaires, BCIJ; known colloquially as the Moroccan FBI) is the law enforcement branch of the DGST. Based in Salé, it was founded in 2015 pursuant to a law passed following the 2011 Marrakesh bombing which gave officers of the DGST the same legal status as police officers. The BCIJ is subordinate to the DGST but under the supervision of the Public Prosecutor's Office.

The BCIJ has an elite counter-terrorism unit led by the DGST as well as a unit fighting organized crime under the supervision of the DGSN's National Judicial Police Brigade (BNPJ). The first chief of the BCIJ, Abdelhak Khiame, was chargé de mission at the Cabinet of the Director-General. In 2021, the BCIJ announced that they dismantled 86 terrorist cells, arresting 1,386 people since its creation in 2015.

=== Directorate of Operations (DOP) ===
According to El Confidencial, the SIGINT operations of the DOP is led by the Cooperation and Protocol Service (SCP). The DOP leads the Internet Management and Operations Department (DGEI), the Operating Systems Management Department (DGSO), the Department of General Affairs (DAG), the Operational Monitoring Department (DSO), the Department of Electronics (OF), and the Technical Coordination Entity (ECT). The Directorate of Operations is known for using spyware, IMSI catchers, and GPS tracking.

==== Operational Monitoring Department (DSO) ====
The Operational Monitoring Department (French: Departement de la surveillance opérationnelle, DSO), formerly known as the Police for Radio Communications (French: Police des communications radioélectriques, PCR), colloquially known as the "radio center", is the DGST's signal intelligence (SIGINT) directorate. The directorate intercepts thousands of communications per day, including phone calls, text messages, faxes, and e-mails.

The PCR was founded in the 1960s under King Hassan II to help mitigate coup d'états against his rule. The DST sought American expertise to reform the PCR for Internet surveillance following the 2003 Casablanca attacks. In July 2008, twenty members of Morocco's House of Councillors were arrested and found guilty of corruption following intelligence supplied by the DST from intercepted phone calls by the PCR. Since 2009, the DGST has been a customer of Amesys for SIGINT software.

The few dozen technicians for the DSO are specialized in intercepting communications satellites, and cracking encrypted communications. The PCR reportedly provides daily reports of a few hundred selected intercepts from national and international communications to the DGST's Cabinet of the Director-General. From 2014 to 2021, the DGST reportedly began purchasign software from Verint Systems for SIGINT and social media exploitation.

As of 2010, the PCR is reported to have operated a computer system which allowed the DST to perform keyword searches from intercepted e-mails, phone calls through speech recognition, and documents through handwriting recognition. According to these reports, system reportedly has automatic traffic sorting and has a dictionary of keywords, phone numbers, and e-mails of interest for monitoring. The DSO is also reported to have used Hacking Team spyware in 2007. According to Amnesty International, the DGST is also a customer of the Pegasus spyware and the Hermit spyware.

== History ==
=== Formation and Cold War ===
On May 16, 1956, the General Directorate for National Security (French: Sûreté Nationale; DGSN) was founded as the country's national police force and was modeled after the French National Police. Counter-subversion was led by the 7th police district in Casablanca and was led by Houssine Seghir, a plumber in the Mers Sultan district and ex-member of an anti-colonial resistance movement in Casablanca.

In 1958, the DGSN was expanded with seven counter-subversion forces labeled "cabinets". The most notorious of these cabinets was Cabinet no. 1 or CAB 1, which was the cabinet charged with political affairs. Among those cabinets was Cabinet no. 7, known as CAB 7 or "the Seventh", which was tasked with interrogations.

In the early 1960s, the CAB 1 became a fully-fledged intelligence service after a restructuring led by three CIA officers and French experts. King Hassan II, an ardent anti-communist, held close ties with Western intelligence services during the Cold War. According to Ahmed Boukhari, the CAB 1 had 300 agents and had brigades in six cities. The CAB 1 ran a number of secret prisons, which they codenamed "fixed points". In 2001, Boukhari implicated the CAB 1, Mossad, and the French SDECE in the 1965 disappearance of Mehdi Ben Barka.

In 1972, following two coup attempts against King Hassan II, the King dissolved the DGSN's "cabinets" including the CAB 1. On January 12, 1973, following the dismantling of the CAB 1 a year prior, a Royal Dahir was signed by King Hassan II creating the Directorate of Territorial Surveillance (French: Direction de la surveillance du territoire; DST).

Modeled after its French counterpart, the Dahir set the DST's main responsibility as "safeguarding and protecting the security of the State and its institutions". The DST was also tasked with "looking for and to prevent, through the collection of intelligence, activities that are inspired, or undertaken or supported by subversive or terrorist movements" while also being responsible for "responding to interference by external foreign agents". The same day, a military foreign intelligence service was created, the General Directorate for Studies and Documentation (French: Direction Générale des Études et de la Documentation; DGED), also modeled after the French SDECE and which officially replaced the CAB 1. The DST and the DGED were both led by Ahmed Dlimi until his death in 1983.

=== War on terror ===
During the Global War on Terror, the DST held close cooperations with the CIA and provided an intelligence-gathering platform for the Sahel. In the 2000s, the DST held capabilities in technical eavesdropping and clandestine surveillance.

In 2002, the DST received information regarding an al-Qaeda sleeper cell following intelligence received from an informant. After further investigation by the DST which involved eavesdropping, three Saudi nationals were arrested by the Royal Gendarmerie for planning to attack an American warship off the Strait of Gibraltar.

In January 2004, the DST led to the arrest of three underage girls who were planning to commit suicide bombing attacks in Casablanca after information received from a local informant.

In 2005, Abdellatif Hammouchi became the head of the DST, which he later renamed to DGST.

The DGST holds a large network of personal informants, which they use to obtain human intelligence (HUMINT). The constant presence of the DGST has infused Moroccan society so deeply that it is believed that informing the DGST has taken the status of a patriotic duty.

In 2015, the DGST reportedly warned their French counterparts that ISIS leader Abdelhamid Abaaoud was in Greece. After the 2015 Paris attacks masterminded by Abaaoud, the DGST also reportedly informed French authorities about Abaaoud's whereabouts and gave information about the Belgian cell behind the attacks.

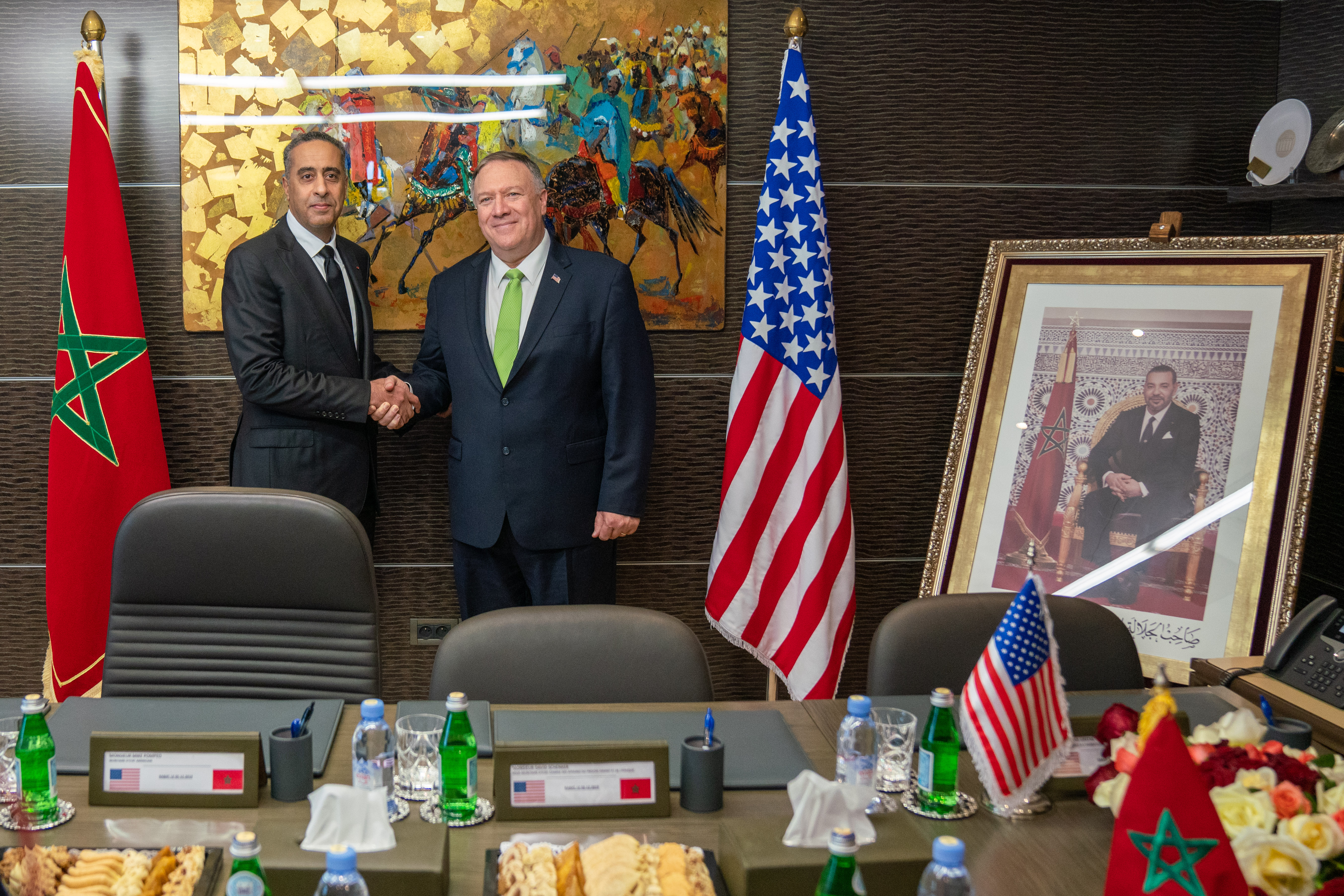
U.S. Secretary of State Mike Pompeo with Abdellatif Hammouchi, the Director-General of the DGST and DGSN, in 2019

Prior to the 2016 Berlin truck attack, the DGST contacted the German Federal Intelligence Service (BND) regarding a terror cell in Berlin which included the perpetrator, Anis Amri. The DGST contacted the BND four times about Amri, who was named and marked as dangerous by the DGST, and provided information regarding his associates and links to ISIS alongside photographs of him. In 2021, the DGST announced that they had dismantled 213 terrorist cells since 2002.

On 21 September 2022, Qatar and Morocco have signed a joint declaration on sharing the information concerning 2022 FIFA World Cup.

On 24 October 2022, Morocco and Germany have agreed to expand security cooperation to halt organized crime, including terrorism, human trafficking, Cybercrime, and fraud.

On 8 September 2023, an earthquake with a magnitude of 6.8 M_{w} hit Marrakesh-Safi region of Morocco. DGST along with DGSN has announced it will contribute MAD 50 million to Special Fund for Managing Earthquake Effects.

== Controversy ==
The DST is mired in many torture allegations and scandals. As early as 2002 it operated the Temara interrogation centre, a black site for extraordinary renditions and interrogations on behalf of the United States. After the 2003 Casablanca bombings, the DST became involved in controversial interrogation methods to obtain confessions from suspects. After the 2011 Arab spring protest the secret detention centre is said to have been relocated to the Ain Aouda secret prison. Additionally, it has been revealed that the United States paid Morocco US$20 million to build a secret detention centre sometime in 2004–2006.

In 2010, Zakaria Moumni a former Moroccan Thai boxing champion, was arrested upon entering Morocco. later revealed that he Zakaria Moumni tortured and then imprisoned on trumped-up charges, on instructions from Mounir Majidi (the secretary of king Mohammed VI) and the head of the DST Abdellatif Hammouchi. and the US official at the same year Ali Aarras, a Belgian citizen, was extradited to Morocco from Spain where he was cleared of terrorism charges because of lack of evidence. After his extradition to Morocco and subsequent trial, he was condemned by judge Abdelkader Chentouf to 10-years in prison. The sentence was based on confessions, which according to Ali Aarras were obtained under torture.

In February 2014, DGST director Abdellatif Hammouchi, while on an official visit to France, was summoned by a French judge to answer for torture allegations in various cases, including the case of Zakaria Moumni and the Gdeim Izik protest camp suspects. This caused a diplomatic incident and vivid protestations from the Moroccan state apparatus who responded by suspending judicial cooperation accords with France. And announced that it will sue the plaintiffs for libel. However, the Moroccan Ministry of the Interior retracted all its lawsuits in France just days after filing them.

== Directors ==
=== Counter-subversion department and CAB1 ===
During this era the director of the DGSN was also the joint director of the CAB1.

- Mohamed Laghzaoui (DGSN) 1956–July 1960
- Houssine Seghir (joint director of the political police) 1956 – July 1960
- Mohamed Oufkir (DGSN) July 1960 – 1970, then 1967–1971 as MOI.
- Ahmed Dlimi (CAB1) 1961–1966 then 1970–1973 (DGSN)
- Abdelhak Achaachi 1967–1973 (coordinator)
- Mohamed Achaachi (Head of counter-subversion unit in the CAB1 during the 1960s)

=== DST & DGST ===
- Ahmed Dlimi 1973 – January 1983
- Driss Basri January 1983 – 1999
- Hamidou Laanigri 1999–2003
- Ahmed Harari 2003–2005
- Abdellatif Hammouchi 2005–present

Note: In 2005 the DST was renamed DGST.
