= Abdul Latif Nasir =

Moroccan man detained in US military prison

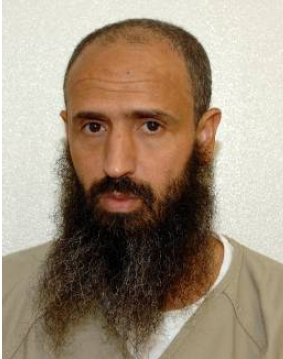
- Born: March 4, 1965 (age 61); Casablanca, Morocco
- Detained at: Guantanamo (released July 19, 2021)
- ISN: 244
- Charge: None
- Status: Released

Abdul Latif Nasir (Arabic: عبد اللطيف ناصر) is a Moroccan man formerly held in administrative detention in the United States Guantanamo Bay detention camps, in Cuba. His Guantanamo Internment Serial Number was 244. Joint Task Force Guantanamo counter-terrorism analysts report he was born on March 4, 1965, in Casablanca, Morocco. Abdul Latif Nasir and Sufyian Barhoumi tried to file emergency requests to be transferred from Guantanamo in the final days of Barack Obama's presidency.

His story was covered on a podcast by Radiolab, called The Other Latif, which was hosted by the similarly named Latif Nasser.

He was released on July 19, 2021, as part of an effort by the Biden administration to shut down the Guantanamo Bay detention facility.

== Inconsistent identification ==
Nasser was identified inconsistently on official Department of Defense documents:

- He was identified as Abdul Latif Nasir on the Summary of Evidence memo prepared for his Combatant Status Review Tribunal, on 29 November 2004, on the Summary of Evidence memo prepared for his first annual Administrative Review Board, on 21 November 2005, and on five official lists of captives' names.
- He was identified as Abdulatif Nasser on the Summary of Evidence memo was prepared for his second annual Administrative Review Board, on 17 October 2006.

== Life in Guantanamo ==
Nasir was captured in Afghanistan in the fall of 2001 by fighters of the Northern Alliance. His attorneys claimed he was given to the US Military for a bounty. He was transferred to Guantanamo in 2002. In Guantanamo, he compiled a 2000 word Arabic to English, English to Arabic dictionary.

== Official status reviews ==
The Bush presidency asserted that captives apprehended in the war on terror were not covered by the Geneva Conventions, and could be held indefinitely without charge, and without an open and transparent review of the justifications for their detention. In 2004 the United States Supreme Court ruled, in Rasul v. Bush, that Guantanamo captives were entitled to be informed of the allegations against them, and were entitled to challenge their detention.

=== Office for the Administrative Review of Detained Enemy Combatants ===
Combatant Status Review Tribunals were held in a 3x5 meter trailer where the captive sat with his hands and feet shackled to a bolt in the floor.

Following the Supreme Court's ruling the Department of Defense set up the Office for the Administrative Review of Detained Enemy Combatants.

Scholars at the Brookings Institution, led by Benjamin Wittes, listed the captives still held in Guantanamo in December 2008, according to whether their detention without charges was justified by evidence of common allegations:

- Abdul Latif Nasir was listed as one of the captives who "The military alleges ... traveled to Afghanistan for jihad."
- Abdul Latif Nasir was listed as one of the captives who "The military alleges that the following detainees stayed in Al Qaeda, Taliban or other guest- or safehouses."
- Abdul Latif Nasir was listed as one of the captives who "The military alleges ... took military or terrorist training in Afghanistan."
- Abdul Latif Nasir was listed as one of the captives who "The military alleges ... fought for the Taliban."
- Abdul Latif Nasir was listed as one of the captives who "The military alleges ... were at Tora Bora."
- Abdul Latif Nasir was listed as one of the captives whose "names or aliases were found on material seized in raids on Al Qaeda safehouses and facilities."
- Abdul Latif Nasir was listed as one of the captives who "The military alleges that the following detainees were captured under circumstances that strongly suggest belligerency."
- Abdul Latif Nasir was listed as one of the captives who was a member of the "al Qaeda leadership cadre".
- Abdul Latif Nasir was listed as one of the "82 detainees made no statement to CSRT or ARB tribunals or made statements that do not bear materially on the military's allegations against them."

=== Formerly secret Joint Task Force Guantanamo assessment ===
On April 25, 2011, whistleblower organization WikiLeaks published formerly secret assessments drafted by Joint Task Force Guantanamo analysts. His 15-page Joint Task Force Guantanamo assessment was drafted on October 22, 2008. It was signed by camp commandant Rear Admiral David M. Thomas Jr. He recommended continued detention.

=== Guantanamo Joint Review Task Force ===
Carol Rosenberg, of the Miami Herald worked for years to get the Department of Defense to release its classification of the remaining captives. In 2013 she was able to learn that Abdul Latif Nasser was one of 48 captives for whom there was no evidence for being held, and who officials nevertheless regarded as too potentially dangerous to release -- "forever prisoners".

=== Status during the Trump administration ===
President Barack Obama's administration pushed to transfer as many individuals from Guantanamo as possible during his last year. The Washington Post reported that Abdul Latif Nasir was one of five individuals who had been cleared for release, but remained in Guantanamo when President Donald Trump was inaugurated.

In 2020, Latif's case was covered by the Radiolab podcast in a series titled "The Other Latif", reported by a journalist with a similar name, which attracted attention.

== Release ==
On July 19, 2021, he was released and repatriated to Morocco. He had been recommended for discharge since 2016. Nasser's family members in Casablanca pledged to support him by finding him work in his brother's swimming pool cleaning business, according to his lawyer Thomas Anthony Durkin. He was detained for 19 years and was never charged.
