= Repatriation of Ahmed Agiza and Muhammad al-Zery =

Repatriation

Ahmed Agiza (Arabic: أحمد عجيزة) and Muhammad Alzery (Arabic: محمد الزيري) (also Elzari, el-Zary, etc.) were two Egyptian asylum-seekers who were deported to Egypt from Sweden on December 18, 2001, apparently following a request from the United States Central Intelligence Agency. The forced repatriation was criticized because of the danger of torture and ill treatment, and because the deportation decision was executed the same day without notifying the lawyers of the asylum seekers. The deportation was carried out by American and Egyptian personnel on Swedish ground, with Swedish servicemen apparently as passive onlookers.

Sweden had negotiated guarantees from Egypt, however, there are allegations that both men were tortured, but Sweden has been unable to prove or disprove these allegations, due to refusal by Egyptian authorities to allow proper investigations. Alzery was released without charges after two years in prison, but was not allowed to leave his village, nor could he speak to foreigners. Agiza was sentenced to 15 years in prison in a military tribunal. He was finally released from prison on August 9, 2011. Agiza told his story in a Swedish newspaper.

== Procedure ==
Both men had sought asylum in Sweden; Zery using a false passport. The security services of Sweden had recommended that the men's requests for asylum be denied on security grounds. The administration had obtained a statement from a high-ranking Egyptian government official stating that the men would be treated humanely and in accordance with the Egyptian constitution. On this basis, the government decided on their immediate deportation. The two men were arrested on the street, in one case, and in a telephone booth while talking with his lawyer, in the other, and they were driven to the airport within a few hours, and given over to a group of American and Egyptian personnel who flew them out of the country within minutes.

Agiza and al-Zery both alleged they had received electrical shocks to their genitals.

In the meantime, the lawyer who experienced the interrupted conversation called the Swedish foreign office to figure out what was going on, but could not find anyone who could tell. Instead, he was told that no decision had been reached. The Foreign office sent certified letters to the lawyers, but these arrived two days after the men were in Egyptian custody.

This haste circumvented all procedural rules and deprived the detainees and their lawyers of all opportunity to question the reasons, to verify the correctness of the information underlying the decisions, or to supply corrections or additional information. The men and their lawyers were never allowed to learn about the accusations against them on which the security services based their recommendation. For example, it appears that the government believed they had obtained a letter from the Egyptian authorities with clear promises of respecting the human rights of the men. When the letter was later disclosed, it turned out to promise only that they would be treated in accordance with Egypt's constitution and law. When Sweden later tried to do some follow-up on the issue, the agreement in the letter proved woefully inadequate. This could have been discovered before the deportation, quite independent of the different views of the actual danger the men posed to Sweden, and would almost certainly have been discovered had due process rules been observed.

This handling was later condemned and found illegal by the Swedish Parliamentary Ombudsman. The United Nations Human Rights Committee found the deportation of Alzery a breach of Sweden's obligations under the international treaties that Sweden has entered into. The primary ground was the obvious and well known risk of torture to which Alzery was exposed. The immediate execution of the deportation decision was also found to breach Sweden's obligation to ensure the deportation could be reviewed by the Human Rights Committee, especially since Alzery's lawyer had previously announced his determination to appeal any negative decision to the Committee. In Agiza's case, the UN Committee on Torture reached similar conclusions.

The Swedish television program Kalla Fakta that first reported these deportations stated:

But much of the information that the Foreign Office and Säpo [Swedish security service police] have are wrong, Agiza is not convicted of the murder of president Sadat, not even a suspect. Säpo thinks that Alzery is convicted of crimes. That is incorrect. Agiza is said to have contacts high up in Al Qaida, and it is correct that he knows Ayman Al Zawahiri, today known as Usama Bin Laden's second in command. These two were both active in the Egyptian opposition in the beginning of the nineties, and met during Agiza's exile in Pakistan in the middle of the nineties. But Säpo doesn't have any reports of later contacts between them. And Agiza has several times publicly denounced Al Zawahiri and his ideology of violence. Agiza is convicted. He was convicted in his absence in 1999, together with 106 others, by a military court in Cairo for membership in Talal al-Fatah, an illegal organisation. The proceedings took 20 minutes. Neither the Egyptian security police nor Swedish Säpo have been able to produce any information pointing to Alzery as a leading member of the same organization.

The fates of these men has since been used in courts to prevent other deportations to Egypt from other countries, in spite of guarantees.

== National and international responses ==
Human Rights Watch published a harsh criticism of both the deportation from Sweden and the trial in 2004 in Egypt of Ahmed Agiza. This organization had a representative present in all four sittings of the trial.

The deportation only became widely known to the general public after the Swedish television network TV4 in its series Kalla fakta (Cold Facts) in May 2004 reported on the deportation under the heading "The broken promise", by the journalists, Sven Bergman, Fredrik Laurin, and Joachim Dyfvermark.

After the publication, the Swedish government was dismissive in its responses to inquiries from members of the Swedish parliament. Criminal investigations was undertaken twice, but no crime was found. The Parliamentary Ombudsman examined the handling of the case after the decision had been made, and criticised harshly various aspects of the degrading treatment of the subjects at the airport. However, these investigations failed to question the decision itself, nor was the haste of its execution and the failure to inform the lawyers or allow time to have the decisions examined by international human rights bodies questioned.

The Committee against Torture under the United Nations' Office of the High Commissioner for Human Rights found on May 24, 2004, that the Government of Sweden had violated its obligations under the Convention against Torture in the forced repatriation of Mr. Agiza.

The United Nations' Human Rights Committee found that Sweden had "at least plausible grounds for considering, at the time, the case in question to present national security concerns." In consequence, the Committee did not find "a violation of article 13 of the Covenant for the failure to be allowed to submit reasons against his deportation and have the case reviewed by a competent authority".

== Civil suit ==
On August 1, 2007, Agiza joined a civil suit filed under the United States' Alien Tort Statute, with the assistance of the American Civil Liberties Union. Agiza was joined with four other men, Bisher Al-Rawi, Abou Elkassim Britel Binyam Mohamed, and Mohamed Farag Ahmad Bashmilah.

== Aftermath ==
In March 2007, the Swedish government overturned the decision to repatriate Alzery. A short time before, an application for residence permit was denied on grounds that he was deported. In May 2007, the repatriation of Agiza was also overturned.

In July 2008 and September 19, 2008, they were each awarded 3 million SEK ($380,000) in damages in a settlement with the Swedish ministry of justice.

In November 2009, the Swedish government on appeal denied the renewed applications for residence in Sweden that had been submitted following the formal overturning of the repatriations in March 2007.

In July 2012, the Swedish government granted Agiza a permanent residence permit.

== Allegation of US threats ==
In January 2009, it was claimed that the United States had threatened to impose trade barriers on the European Union if the two men were not transferred. Reporter Eva Franchell, friend of the deceased foreign minister Anna Lindh, witness to her murder, and at an earlier stage her press secretary, published a book about Lindh where she described the difficulties surrounding the repatriation decision, as well as the participation of other politicians who allegedly later conveniently shoved the responsibility over to the deceased Lindh.

== See also ==
- Extraordinary rendition by the United States
