= Robert D. Rachlin =

American lawyer

Robert D. Rachlin (1936 - December 27, 2025) was a Vermont, U.S. lawyer. He was a partner in Downs Rachlin Martin PLLC, the state's largest law firm, practicing in the firm's Burlington, Vermont office.

Rachlin spent most of his legal career handling cases for business clients.

== Guantánamo detainee clients ==
He volunteered to the Center for Constitutional Rights to serve as an attorney for detainees at the Guantanamo Bay detention camp, who originally were given no access to counsel. In landmark decisions from 2004 to 2008, United States Supreme Court decisions have upheld the detainees rights to habeas corpus to challenge their detentions before an impartial tribunal, rights to counsel, and rights to access to United States federal courts.

In a 2006 interview Rachlin said:

This is not a question of whether they deserve a lawyer," he said. "This is a question of whether the system should be allowed to function. The minute you're depriving the most unpopular person of a lawyer, you're setting a precedent. The next thing that happens is you deprive someone a little less popular, and then eventually you're depriving your political opponents. We're protecting our fellow citizens, as well as these people.

Rachlin represented two clients who are Guantánamo detainees: Algerian Djamel Saiid Ali Ameziane, an Algerian citizen, and Ghassan Abdullah al Sharbi, from Saudi Arabia. Between August 2005 and April 2006, Rachlin made five trips to Guantánamo to see his clients.

In 2006, al-Sharbi was one of the ten Guantánamo detainees facing charges before a military commission. Al-Sharbi wanted to decline legal representation. Rachlin tried arranging for al-Sharbi to talk, by phone, with his parents, hoping they would be able to convince him to accept Rachlin's legal assistance and that of the military counsel assigned by the Department of Defense.

In reply to the allegations against Ameziane as contained in the record of his Administrative Review Board, released in March 2006, Rachlin has said:

There's nothing here that shows that he so much as held a firearm or did anything against the United States -- he's one of those guys who were at the wrong place at the wrong time. There's nothing more here than guilt by association.

Rachlin serves as a faculty member of Vermont Law School. He was also a concert pianist and co-founder of the Vermont Chamber Group.
