= Temara interrogation centre =

Interrogation centre in Morocco

Temara
- Interactive map of Temara
- Location: Temara; 33°56′03″N 6°51′48″W
- Status: Active
- Managed by: Abdellatif Hamouchi, Director of the Directorate for the Surveillance of the Territory

The Temara interrogation center, also known as Temara secret detention center (Arabic: معتقل تمارة السري), is an extrajudicial detainment and secret prison facility of Morocco located within a forested area of Rabat. It is operated by the Directorate for the Surveillance of the Territory (Direction de la surveillance du territoire, DST), a Moroccan domestic intelligence agency implicated in past and ongoing human rights violations, which continues to arrest, detain and interrogate individuals suspected of involvement in terrorism-related activities outside of the Moroccan legal framework.

== History ==
The first known detainee was Mohammed Mossadegh Benkhadra (Arabic: محمد مصدق بن خضراء), in 1985 and spent 8 years in extrajudicial detainment and without trial. And later when he was released 1993, he wrote the book "Tazmara 234", contraction from words Temara and Tazmamart another popular prison and as a sign of continued abuse from the Years of Lead (Morocco) to present days. More recently, Zakaria Moumni claimed to have been tortured there when he was arrested in 2010.

== CIA black site ==
So-called "rendition" illegal flights of the CIA, as reported by Rzeczpospolita

The Associated Press reported in August 2010 that, according to several current and former American officials, the US government possesses video and audio recordings of Ramzi Binalshibh, an accused plotter of the September 11, 2001 attacks being interrogated in a secret prison. The US officials told the AP that the prison was run by Moroccans but largely financed by the CIA, which in late 2002 handed Binalshibh over to Moroccan custody and kept him there for five months. The Moroccan government has never acknowledged the facility's existence, despite allegations by freed Guantanamo detainee Binyam Mohamed Temara interrogation centre and others that the CIA relied on Morocco as a secret proxy detention site during the period after September 11, 2001.

== Torture of detainees ==
Members of the DST are not considered to be part of the judicial police and as such should not arrest and hold suspects. Frequently reported methods of torture include beatings, the suspension of the body in contorted positions, and the threat of rape or other sexual abuse of the detainees. Other reported methods include rape by the forced insertion of objects such as bottles into the anus, sleep deprivation, cigarette burns, and the application of live electrodes to the body. Several non-government organizations such as Amnesty International and Human Rights Watch have denounced reports of torture at the facility.

== See also ==
- History of Morocco
- Human rights in Morocco
- Politics of Morocco
- Ali Bourequat
- Malika Oufkir
- Mohamed Oufkir
- Dar Es Salam Palace, Rabat
