= Abdellatif Hammouchi =

Moroccan intelligence and police chief

- عبد اللطيف حموشي
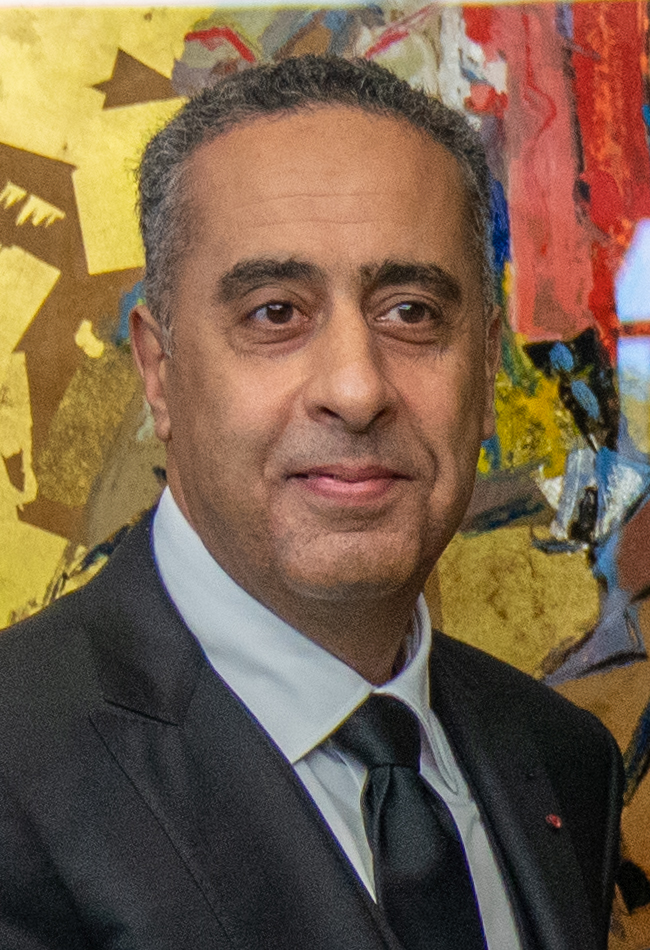

Director of the DGST
- Incumbent
- Assumed office 15 December 2005
- Preceded by: Ahmed Harrari

Advisor to Mohammed VI on counter-terrorism
- Incumbent
- Assumed office 1999

Personal details
- Born: October 7, 1966 (age 60) Bni Ftah, Morocco

Abdellatif Hammouchi (Arabic: عبد اللطيف حموشي, romanized: ʿAbd al-Laṭīf Ḥamūshī; born 1966 in Taza, Morocco) is a Moroccan security official who serves concurrently as Director General of the General Directorate for National Security (DGSN; French: Direction générale de la Sûreté nationale), Morocco's national police service, and Director General of the General Directorate for Territorial Surveillance (DGST; French: Direction générale de la Surveillance du territoire), the country's domestic intelligence service. The DGST was formerly known as the Directorate of Territorial Surveillance (DST; French: Direction de la Surveillance du territoire).

Hammouchi graduated in law from the Dhar El Mehraz Faculty of Sidi Mohamed Ben Abdellah University in Fez. In 1993, at the age of 27, he joined the General Directorate for National Security and was assigned directly to the Directorate of Territorial Surveillance (DST), which was then under the authority of Interior Minister Driss Basri.

During the following years, he specialized in analyzing Islamist movements and jihadist networks. After the 2003 Casablanca bombings, he participated in the investigations and remained in charge of the DST's counterterrorism service. When Hamidou Laanigri left the DST to head the General Directorate for National Security, Ahmed Harrari succeeded him. Hammouchi replaced Harrari as head of the intelligence service in December 2005.

== Controversies ==
=== Torture allegations and diplomatic dispute with France ===
In February 2014, French police went to the Moroccan ambassador's residence in Paris to deliver a judicial request to question Hammouchi in connection with complaints alleging torture or complicity in torture by Morocco's domestic intelligence service.

The French anti-torture organization ACAT had supported a 2013 complaint by French-Moroccan national Adil Lamtalsi accusing Hammouchi of complicity in torture. The organization also supported a separate complaint concerning Sahrawi human rights activist Ennaâma Asfari, who alleged that he had been tortured in Morocco. ACAT stated that the alleged acts involving Lamtalsi and Asfari had occurred at the Temara interrogation centre, which was administered by the intelligence service headed by Hammouchi.

The Moroccan government rejected the allegations and filed a counterclaim in France against the complainants and ACAT, describing the accusations as false and defamatory. Morocco also suspended judicial cooperation with France in response to the attempted questioning. Cooperation resumed in January 2015 following negotiations between the two governments. The following month, French interior minister Bernard Cazeneuve announced that France would promote Hammouchi to Officer of the Legion of Honour. ACAT criticized the decision because the complaints against him remained under judicial investigation.

=== Imprisonment of Rachid Niny ===
Moroccan journalist and newspaper editor Rachid Niny was arrested on 28 April 2011 after publishing articles critical of the security services and senior public officials. One of the columns cited in the judgment accused Hammouchi of abusing his authority as head of the DGST.

In June 2011, Niny was sentenced to one year in prison and fined 1,000 dirhams on charges that included disseminating false information and attacking state institutions, public figures and the security of the country. The conviction was upheld on appeal, and he was released after completing the sentence in April 2012. Reporters Without Borders linked his prosecution to his reporting about Hammouchi and criticized the conduct of the proceedings.

=== Pegasus spyware investigation ===
In 2021, the international investigation known as the Pegasus Project reported that Morocco had used the Pegasus spyware developed by NSO Group to target journalists, human rights activists, dissidents and foreign political figures. Hammouchi headed the DGST, the agency identified in the investigation, although the reporting did not establish that he had personally directed individual surveillance operations. Morocco denied purchasing or using Pegasus.

In July 2026, a new investigation coordinated by Forbidden Stories, involving 14 media organizations and supported by Amnesty International's Security Lab, published additional evidence concerning Morocco's use of Pegasus. The investigation drew on internal documents, forensic analysis, leaked targeting records and testimony from former Moroccan intelligence officers. According to the investigation, the DGST—and particularly its internet and operations department—had been the main Moroccan user of Pegasus since 2017. The Moroccan government and NSO Group did not respond to requests for comment from the participating media organizations.

=== Jabaroot data leak ===
In August 2026, the hacker group Jabaroot released four spreadsheets that it claimed contained information about approximately 70,000 members of Morocco's police, security and intelligence services. The files included Hammouchi and other senior DGSN and DGST officials, together with alleged identification numbers, bank details, recruitment dates and dates of birth. Le Monde, which examined the files, stated that it could not authenticate the lists and cautioned that they appeared to combine intelligence officers, police officers, administrative employees and other public officials.

According to sources cited by Le Monde, the disclosure was produced by five former DGST members living in exile in Europe. They alleged that personal information had been misused during telephone interceptions and background investigations and called for Hammouchi's dismissal. At the time of publication, the DGSN, the DGST and the Moroccan Ministry of the Interior had not publicly responded to the allegations.

== Honors and awards ==
Hammouchi received Morocco's Order of the Throne from Mohammed VI in 2011.

On 29 November 2016, Maroc Hebdo International named him its Person of the Year.

In September 2019, the Spanish government awarded Hammouchi the Grand Cross of the Order of Merit of the Civil Guard. The decoration was formally presented to him in Madrid by Spanish interior minister Fernando Grande-Marlaska in November 2025.

== Security cooperation ==
On June 3, 2024, Hammouchi met in Rabat with Vittorio Pisani, Director General of Public Security and Chief of the Italian State Police, who was visiting Morocco with a police delegation. They reviewed existing cooperation between the two countries and discussed cross-border crime, including human trafficking, irregular migration, drug trafficking, and money laundering. The talks also covered information sharing, operational coordination, and technical assistance between their respective agencies.

From June 24 to 26, 2024, Hammouchi made a working visit to Germany at the invitation of the German authorities. He met with Dieter Romann, President of the Federal Police, and Holger Münch, President of the Federal Criminal Police Office (BKA). Their discussions focused on counterterrorism, transnational organized crime, and security arrangements for major sporting events.

During the visit, the Moroccan delegation toured Germany's Joint Counter-Terrorism Centre in Berlin to examine how the country's police and intelligence agencies coordinate their work. Hammouchi also visited the Olympiastadion and the police operations center responsible for security during UEFA Euro 2024, as part of an exchange on policing major sporting events.

=== Interpol ===
Hammouchi led the Moroccan delegation to the 92nd Interpol General Assembly, held in Glasgow from November 4 to 7, 2024. During the assembly, Mohammed Dkhissi, Director of Morocco's Judicial Police and head of the Interpol National Central Bureau in Rabat, was elected Interpol Vice-President for Africa for a three-year term. At the closing ceremony, the United Kingdom formally handed the Interpol flag to Morocco as the host of the following General Assembly.

The 93rd Interpol General Assembly was held in Marrakesh from November 24 to 27, 2025. Hammouchi addressed the opening session, which brought together more than 800 delegates from 179 countries, including 82 police chiefs. The agenda included transnational organized crime, international scam centers, cybercrime, information sharing and new policing capabilities.

== Decorations ==
- Officer of the Order of the Throne (2011)
- Officer of the Legion of Honour of France (2016)
- Grand-Cross of the Order of Merit of the Civil Guard of Spain (2019)

== See also ==
- Fouad Ali El Himma
- Yassine Mansouri
- Abdelkader Belliraj
