= Zakaria Moumni =

Moroccan kickboxer

Zakaria Moumni (Arabic: زكرياء مومني; born 4 February 1980) is a former kickboxer who was detained by the Moroccan authorities between September 2010 and February 2012.

== Torture incident ==
According to Moumni he was arrested in September 2010 upon his arrival at the Rabat–Salé Airport, he was then blindfolded and taken to a place he'd later identify as the Temara interrogation centre. He was beaten and raped for several days . He was then tried on serious charges and convicted of "immigration scam" based on the testimony of two people he'd never seen. He was then taken to Zaki prison in Salé where he remained until February 2012 when he was released after being issued a royal pardon from Mohammed VI.

Later the Moroccan state sued Moumni and the other plaintiffs in a Paris court for libel. Despite several credible reports, including by the US Department of State, which point to the use of torture and arbitrary detention in Morocco. Additionally Morocco has been several times identified as the location of a CIA Black site where Moroccan services tortured foreign terrorism suspects allegedly at the request of the US.
