= Hisham Bin Al Bin Amor Sliti =

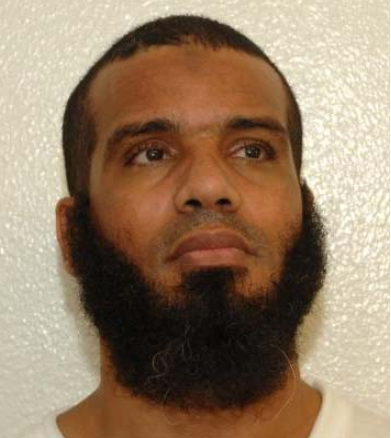
- Hisham Sliti's Guantanamo identity portrait, showing him wearing a white uniform issued to compliant individuals
- Born: February 12, 1966 (age 60); Hamam Lif, Tunisia
- Detained at: Guantanamo
- ISN: 174
- Charge: No charge (extrajudicial detention)
- Status: Given asylum in Slovakia in November 2014

Hisham Sliti, is a citizen of Tunisia and France who was held in extrajudicial detention in the United States Guantanamo Bay detention camps, in Cuba. His Guantanamo Internment Serial Number is 174. The list of the names of all the Guantanamo detainees states that his date of birth was February 12, 1966, in Hamam Lif, Tunisia. He was transferred to Guantanamo on May 1, 2002, and held there for twelve and a half years. On November 20, 2014, Sliti and Hussein Salem Mohammed were granted asylum in Slovakia.

Clive Stafford Smith represents Sliti as one of his lawyers.

Sliti reported to his lawyers that he was beaten on August 5, 2005. Sliti claims that his interrogator threw a chair, and a mini-fridge at him, and then called in the initial reaction force. Sliti participated in a widespread hunger strike during July 2005, and then participated in a second hunger strike that started in August 2005 due to Qur'an desecration.

The Slovak Spectator reports that Sliti was arrested by Slovak security officials, and the release of their arrest video stirred controversy.

== Official status reviews ==
Originally the Bush Presidency asserted that captives apprehended in the "war on terror" were not covered by the Geneva Conventions, and could be held indefinitely, without charge, and without an open and transparent review of the justifications for their detention. In 2004, the United States Supreme Court ruled, in Rasul v. Bush, that Guantanamo captives were entitled to being informed of the allegations justifying their detention, and were entitled to try to refute them.

=== Office for the Administrative Review of Detained Enemy Combatants ===
Combatant Status Review Tribunals were held in a 3x5 meter trailer where the captive sat with his hands and feet shackled to a bolt in the floor.

Following the Supreme Court's ruling the Department of Defense set up the Office for the Administrative Review of Detained Enemy Combatants.

Scholars at the Brookings Institution, led by Benjamin Wittes, listed the captives still held in Guantanamo in December 2008, according to whether their detention was justified by certain common allegations:

- Hisham Bin Ali Bin Amor Sliti was listed as one of the captives who "The military alleges ... are associated with both Al Qaeda and the Taliban."
- Hisham Bin Ali Bin Amor Sliti was listed as one of the captives who "The military alleges that the following detainees stayed in Al Qaeda, Taliban or other guest- or safehouses."
- Hisham Bin Ali Bin Amor Sliti was listed as one of the captives who "The military alleges ... took military or terrorist training in Afghanistan."
- Hisham Bin Ali Bin Amor Sliti was listed as one of the captives who was an "al Qaeda operative".
- Hisham Bin Ali Bin Amor Sliti was listed as one of the captives who had "denied all the government allegations."

A Summary of Evidence memo was prepared his Combatant Status Review Tribunal on November 19, 2004.

A Summary of Evidence memo was prepared for Hisham Bin Ali Bin Amor Sliti's first annual Administrative Review Board, on September 9, 2005.

A Summary of Evidence memo was prepared for Hisham Bin Ali Bin Amor Sliti's second annual Administrative Review Board, on June 4, 2006.

The OARDEC records show that Sliti did not attend his reviews in 2004 or 2005, he did attend in 2006. The Department of Defense released a 21-page summarized transcript from this hearing.

=== Habeas corpus petition ===
Sliti had a habeas corpus petition, 05-cv-429, filed on his behalf.

On December 30, 2008, US District Court Judge Richard J. Leon ruled that Sliti, and, in a separate ruling, that Moath Hamza Ahmed al-Alwi, "were part of or supported the Taliban", and thus could continue to be held in US custody. Leon did not believe Sliti's assertion that he traveled to Afghanistan to quit drugs and get married, stating his:

...story about traveling to Afghanistan to kick a longstanding drug habit and find a wife is not credible.

The New York Times called the two rulings: "the first clear-cut victories for the Bush administration", while Andy Worthington noted they represented a "disturbing development".

Reuters reported that Jonathan Hafetz of the American Civil Liberties Union responded that:

This decision raises serious concerns given the reliance on classified evidence and the very broad definition of detention authority that it contains.

=== Formerly secret Joint Task Force Guantanamo assessment ===
On April 25, 2011, whistleblower organization WikiLeaks published formerly secret assessments drafted by Joint Task Force Guantanamo analysts. His Joint Task Force Guantanamo assessment was dated October 1, 2008. His assessment was eleven pages long, and was signed by camp commandant Rear Admiral David M. Thomas Jr. He recommended continued detention at Guantanamo.

== Re-arrest in Slovakia ==
Sliti was arrested, in his home, by Slovak security officials. A video of the capture was acquired and broadcast by al Jazeera. Some accounts suggest the video was officially made by the police, and illicitly leaked to al Jazeera. Other accounts suggest the video was an unofficial one, recorded by a third party witness to the arrest.
