= Reprieve (organisation) =

International nonprofit organisation based in the UK

Reprieve is a nonprofit organization of international lawyers and investigators whose stated goal is to "fight for the victims of extreme human rights abuses with legal action and public education". Their main focus is on the death penalty, indefinite detention without trial (such as in Guantanamo), extraordinary rendition and extrajudicial killing. The founding Reprieve organization is in the UK, and there are also organizations in the United States, Australia and the Netherlands, with additional supporters and volunteers worldwide.

== Reprieve UK ==
The first and largest of the Reprieve organizations, Reprieve UK, was founded in 1999, one year after the death penalty was officially abolished in the UK (although having not been exercised since 1964), by human rights lawyer Clive Stafford Smith. Smith has represented over 300 prisoners facing the death penalty in the southern United States and has helped secure the release of 65 Guantánamo Bay prisoners as well as others across the world detained in places such as Bagram Theatre Internment Facility, Afghanistan, who claim to have been tortured by the United States government.

Reprieve currently works to represent 15 prisoners in Guantánamo Bay, as well as an evolving caseload of death row clients around the world. It investigates international complicity in renditions and most recently, has started working with the Foundation for Fundamental Rights in Pakistan, aiming to create conversation around the use of drones there. In 2021, Reprieve UK compiled information on the effects of U.S. drone strikes and counterterrorism actions in order to file a petition and witness statement on behalf of 34 Yemenis at the Inter-American Commission on Human Rights. Reprieve focused its collaborative petition on the human rights consequences of U.S. drone strikes that killed multiple civilians, including "nine children and several members of Yemen's military".

Reprieve UK has twenty-five staff in London and seven Fellows in the US and Pakistan. Its patrons include Martha Lane Fox, Jon Snow, Alan Bennett, Julie Christie and Roger Waters.

Current cases include Andy Tsege, Ali al Nimr, Libya's Sami al-Saadi, stateless Palestinian Abu Zubaydah, Linda Carty, Yunus Rahmatullah, Krishna Maharaj, and Malik Jalal. Recent cases include Samantha Orobator, Binyam Mohamed, Muhammad Saad Iqbal, and Akmal Shaikh, an EU national executed by the Chinese government.

== Reprieve US ==
Reprieve US was founded in 2001 by anti-death penalty lawyers in New Orleans, Louisiana, as a 501(c)(3) charitable legal defense organization, inspired by Reprieve UK. In 2014 Reprieve US opened its headquarters in New York City, and began working on unlawful detention and targeted killing as well as death penalty cases. Reprieve US is an independent sister organization to Reprieve UK; the two organizations share the same mission and work in partnership.

Reprieve US has strongly opposed the Guantanamo Bay detention camp since its founding, and legally represents several of its detainees. They also have a profile on many of its prisoners.

Reprieve US spoke out against the use of nitrogen as a means of capital punishment after the execution of Carey Dale Grayson.

== Capital Punishment Justice Project ==
The Capital Punishment Justice Project (formerly Reprieve Australia) was founded in Melbourne in 2001 by criminal barristers Richard Bourke and Nick Harrington to provide legal representation and humanitarian assistance to those at risk of execution. Initially providing volunteer assistance to programs in the US, the CPJP has since expanded to Asia. The organization is currently led by Julian McMahon.
