= Clive Stafford Smith =

British attorney and activist (born 1959)

Clive Stafford Smith OBE
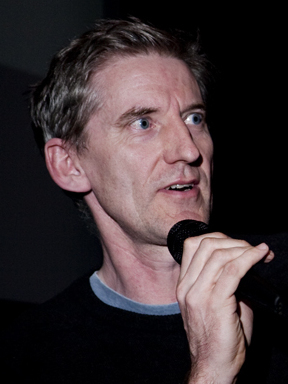
- Stafford Smith in 2010
- Born: Clive Stafford Smith; 9 July 1959 (age 67); Cambridge, England
- Education: University of North Carolina at Chapel Hill; Columbia University
- Occupation: Lawyer
- Years active: 1984–present
- Awards: Gandhi International Peace Award

Clive Adrian Stafford Smith OBE (born 9 July 1959) is a British attorney who specialises in the areas of civil rights and working against capital punishment in the United States. He worked to overturn death sentences for convicts, and helped found the not-for-profit Louisiana Capital Assistance Center in New Orleans. By 2002 this was the "largest capital defence organisation in the South." He was a founding board member of the Gulf Region Advocacy Center, based in Houston, Texas.

In addition, he has represented more than 80 of the detainees held as enemy combatants since 2002 at the Guantanamo Bay detention camp. As of February 2021, a total of 40 men are still held there.

In August 2004, Stafford Smith returned from the U.S. to live and work in the United Kingdom. He is the co-founder of Reprieve, a human rights not-for-profit organisation. He left after 15 years, and has now established a new non-profit called 3DCentre. In 2005, he received the Gandhi International Peace Award.

== Background ==
Born in Cambridge and educated at Old Buckenham Hall School and Radley College, Clive Stafford Smith studied journalism as a Morehead Scholar at the University of North Carolina at Chapel Hill. He followed this degree with another in law at Columbia University in New York. He is licensed to practise law in the state of Louisiana.

== Law career in the United States ==
Stafford Smith worked for the Southern Prisoners' Defense Committee, based in Atlanta, now known as the Southern Center for Human Rights, and on other campaigns to help convicted defendants sentenced to capital punishment. He was featured in Fourteen Days in May (1987), a documentary showing the fortnight prior to the execution of Edward Earl Johnson in Mississippi State Penitentiary. It was aired on the BBC. Stafford Smith had acted as Johnson's attorney and was seen trying to halt the execution. In a follow-up documentary, Stafford Smith conducted his own investigation into the murder case for which Johnson had been executed.

In 1993, he helped set up a new justice center for prisoner advocacy in New Orleans. Formerly named the Louisiana Crisis Assistance Center, it is now known as the Louisiana Capital Assistance Center (LCAC). He represented the paedophile Ricky Langley, who was convicted of murder and sentenced to death. The jurors accepted that the accused was suffering from mental illness, but condemned Langley to capital punishment. The conviction was reversed, and Stafford Smith facilitated a meeting where Ricky apologised to the mother of his victim, Jeremy Guillory. Lorilei Guillory asked the DA to drop the death penalty, which he denied. She testified that Ricky should be in a mental hospital rather than prison, saying "I think he is mentally ill."

In 2002, Stafford Smith became a founding board member of the Gulf Region Advocacy Center, a non-profit law office based in Houston, Texas. It was designed to bring his legal methods developed at LCAC into the "capital of capital punishment", as Texas had the highest number of executions in the United States.

== Guantánamo detainees ==
After returning to Britain, Stafford Smith worked as the founder of Reprieve, a British non-profit NGO that is opposed to the death penalty. During his career in the U.S., by 2002 Stafford Smith had lost appeals in six death penalty cases, but had won nearly 300, earning reprieves from execution for those convicts and exonerating a number of them.

From 2002 Stafford Smith volunteered his services to detainees held as enemy combatants at the United States detainment camp at Guantanamo Bay, established under President George W. Bush as part of the global war on terror. Stafford Smith has assisted in filing habeas corpus petitions and lawsuits on behalf of scores of detainees. His clients have included Shaker Aamer, Jamil al Banna, Sami Al Hajj, Sami Al Laithi, Abdul Salam Gaithan Mureef Al Shehry, Moazzam Begg, Omar Deghayes, Jamal Kiyemba, Binyam Mohammed and Hisham Sliti. In a BBC interview, when asked why he was representing detainees, Stafford Smith answered that "liberty is eroded at the margins".

He returned to Britain in August 2004. That December he prepared a 50-page brief outlining a possible defences against execution for Saddam Hussein, arguing that the former dictator should be tried in the Hague under international law. On 29 August 2005, Stafford Smith addressed attendees at the Greenbelt festival, a major UK Christian festival, telling them about the second hunger strike at Guantanamo. He warned the audience that prisoners were likely to die very soon. Due to restrictions imposed by the United States Department of Defense, lawyers' notes must be filed with an intelligence clearing house in Virginia, before release. Conversations with clients are considered classified, and cannot be discussed until they have full clearance. Smith had to wait until 27 August 2005 to publicly reveal that the hunger strikes had started again on 5 August 2005. A number of his clients, including Binyam "Benjamin" Mohammed and Hisham Sliti, participated in the hunger strikes.

In an interview broadcast by BBC television evening news on 9 September 2005, Stafford Smith said that the second hunger strike was to protest against the imprisonment of juveniles under the age of 18 in Guantanamo Bay.

Stafford Smith contributed to The Guardian with an opinion piece on the significance of the U.S. Supreme Court's 29 June 2006 ruling in Hamdan v. Rumsfeld, which found the Combatant Status Review Tribunals and military commissions to be unconstitutional. The Court held that the executive branch did not have the authority to set up a justice system outside the existing civil and military legal systems. Stafford Smith thought that George W. Bush should have been secretly relieved that the more conservative members of the Supreme Court, who supported the administration's appeal against the lower court's ruling, were in the minority. He wrote:

In the end, I suspect there was a collective sigh of relief from the White House that the lunatic fringe did not prevail. The Bush administration has finally recognized that it must close Guantánamo but—for all that Bush bangs on about the importance of personal responsibility—it wanted someone else to take the blame.

Stafford Smith published a memoir about his experiences at Guantanamo, Bad Men: Guantánamo Bay and the Secret Prisons (2007). It was shortlisted for the 2008 Orwell Prize for political writing. Interviewed by Jon Snow of Channel 4 News on 26 March 2009, Stafford Smith said about the treatment of detainees, "I would go one step further: the torture decisions were being made in the White House, by the National Security Council, Dick Cheney and Condoleezza Rice." He asserted that although the British had not carried out the torture, they were complicit in it. Stafford Smith concluded that, in trying to keep the torture allegations secret, American authorities were "confusing national security with national embarrassment".

On 9 June 2015, he told an audience that he had visited Guantanamo 34 times. In 2013, he went on hunger strike as part of a campaign for the release of Guantanamo detainee Shaker Aamer, who was finally released in 2015.

In 2022, Stafford Smith was featured in the documentary film We Are Not Ghouls, about his work with JAG attorney Yvonne Bradley to free Guantanamo detainee Binyam Mohamed.

== Awards ==
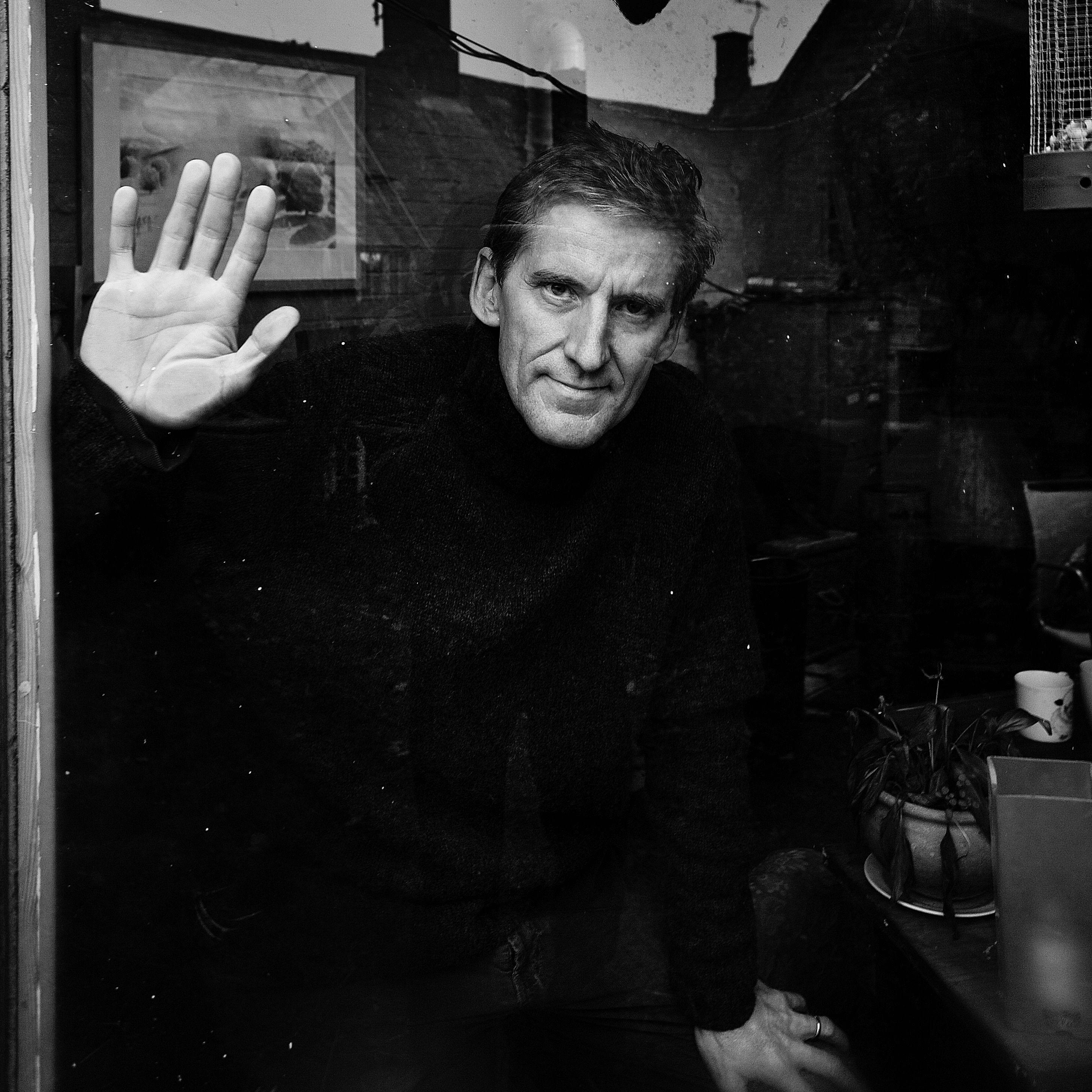
Stafford Smith in 2009

- Appointed Officer of the Order of the British Empire (OBE) in the 2000 New Years' Honours list "for humanitarian services in the legal field"
- Honorary Doctorate of Law by the University of Wolverhampton 2001, for his work fighting the death penalty in America
- Lifetime Achievement Award from The Lawyer Magazine (2003)
- Benjamin Smith Award from the ACLU of Louisiana (2003)
- Soros Senior Fellow, Rowntree Visionary (2005)
- Gandhi International Peace Award 2005, for his work representing Guantanamo detainees and campaigning against extraordinary rendition.
- Lannan Foundation Cultural Freedom Award (2008)
- International Freedom of the Press Award (2009)
- International Bar Association's Human Rights Award (2010)
- Honorary Doctorate by Bournemouth University (2011)
- Honorary Degree (Doctor of Laws) by University of Bath (2011)
- Honorary Degree (Doctor of Laws) by London Metropolitan University

== Publications ==
- Welcome To Hell: Letters and Writings from Death Row, edited by Helen Prejean, Clive Stafford Smith, and Jan Arriens (Northeastern; 2nd edition, 2004) ISBN 1-55553-636-0
- The Eight O'Clock Ferry to the Windward Side: Fighting the Lawless World of Guantanamo Bay (Nation, 2007) ISBN 1-56858-374-5
- Bad Men: Guantánamo Bay and the Secret Prisons (Weidenfeld & Nicolson, 2007). Details his work for detainees in Guantanamo Bay, and criticises advocates of torture.
- Injustice: Life and Death in the Courtrooms of America (Harvill Secker, 2012) ISBN 9781846556258
- The Far Side of the Moon: Trials of My Father (Harvill Secker, 2022) ISBN 9781787301931
