= Unnamed American ISIS fighter =

Unnamed American captive

On September 1, 2017, American officials announced they had taken custody of an American ISIS fighter who they did not identify. In December 2017, it was revealed that he was a dual citizen of the United States and Saudi Arabia. He was the first captive that the United States called an enemy combatant since 2009.

== Early life ==
Doe attended a college in New Orleans, Louisiana in 2005–2006. A college friend told CNN that he was an active partier, who liked to drink to excess and gamble. The New York Times reported that he returned to the United States in 2014, when his wife gave birth.

== Time in Daesh territory and capture ==
Seamus Hughes of the George Washington University Program on Extremism, said that US intelligence officials could learn important information from this individual, stating: "You're looking at a man who was there to the bitter end. Would he have insight on whether they're sending folks away from Iraq and Syria in a systematic way? Are they hunkering down?"

Spencer Ackerman suggested that he should be transferred to the Guantanamo Bay detention camp in Cuba, and that he should face charges there before a Guantanamo Military Commission. He noted that then candidate Donald Trump said he would try American citizens before military commissions. However, Karen Greenberg pointed out that detaining Americans at Guantanmo simply wasn't legal. Ackerman suggested that a legal challenge of military detention by this American could trigger the US judicial branch stripping the president of their authority to continue fighting ISIS. When President Obama initiated military action against ISIS he called on the authority of the 2001 Authorization to Use Military Force, passed shortly after September 11, 2001. That act authorizes the president to order military action against Al Qaeda, and its allies. ISIS and al Qaeda aren't allies; while they hold similar ideologies, they are bitter rivals. Ackerman quoted Matthew Waxman, who wrote:

"The Obama and Trump administrations have relied on a very controversial, stretched interpretation of the 2001 AUMF to cover their military operations against ISIS, but there hasn't been much opportunity for anyone to challenge that interpretation in court. A habeas corpus suit brought by a citizen-detainee like this could be that opportunity."

In September 2017, Carol Rosenberg reported that the US military had begun steps to allow the detainee to meet with representatives of the International Committee of the Red Cross. She wrote that the Trump presidency faced a conundrum due to this captive, since he had campaigned on re-filling the Guantanamo detention camp, but as an American citizen there were legal restrictions on charging him there. Rosenberg said that the Military Commissions Act of 2006 and Military Commissions Act of 2009 only authorized charging foreigners before Guantanamo military commissions, and that if this American captive were to be transferred to Guantanamo, restrictions passed during Obama's presidency would bar transferring him to the United States, so he could not be repatriated to the US to face charges in a US civilian court. Lolita Baldor, quoting anonymous US officials, who confirmed the American ISIS fighter was being held in US facilities in Iraq as of September 28, 2017.

== Comparison with Yasser al Himdy ==
His case was compared with that of Yasser al Himdy, the first individual to be released from the Guantanamo Bay Detention Camp. When U.S. officials transferred al-Himdy from Afghanistan to Guantanamo, they thought he was just one of the approximately 150 Saudi citizens in Guantanamo. Soon after they realized he was also a US citizen the Bush presidency agreed to return him to Saudi Arabia if he surrendered his US citizenship.

The New York Times speculated that he might be offered a similar deal to that offered to al-Himdy, repatriation to Saudi Arabia if he surrendered his American citizenship.

== Discussion over transferring John Doe to Syria ==
In June 2018, the Los Angeles Times reported that some elements of the US government have advocated transferring John Doe back to Syria. Human rights workers have claimed a transfer to Syria was essentially a death sentence. The New York Times reported his lawyers said a forced return to Syria would be a "death sentence".

In response to the Department of Justice's suggestion that Doe be flown back to Syria, and released in the desert where he was first taken into custody, judge Tanya Chutkan stated:

"You're proposing releasing him to a country which is in the middle of a civil war and where suspected ISIS fighters have been executed or tortured, and you propose doing that with a US citizen who has no way of proving that he's a US citizen, no identification whatsoever."

== Doe's account, from court documents ==
In June 2018, CNN published details of Doe's account of himself, from court documents that had recently been made public. Doe claimed he had traveled to Daesh-controlled territory to serve as a freelance journalist. The documents seem to refute descriptions that he was captured "on the battlefield", instead describing peacefully being taken into custody at a border crossing. Doe claimed he had made thirty previous attempts to escape from Daesh controlled territory. Doe claimed that Daesh kidnapped him two days after his arrival, and that he had spent eight months in Daesh custody. He claimed he only agreed to work for the Daesh regime in order to win release from the Daesh prison. Other court documents described a flash drive Doe was carrying containing a bomb-making manual and a Daesh spreadsheet named "Islamic State Spoils and Booty Bureau."

== Release ==
In late October 2018, the detainee was released, with no charges being filed against him. His name was never made public, but The New York Times reported they had determined his name, from Daesh records. The country to which he was released was not made public, but The New York Times reported it was Bahrain. The New York Times reported that, unlike Yasser al-Himdy, he did not have to relinquish his US citizenship, in order to be released. The State Department did cancel his passport. After 2018, his fate and whereabouts are unknown.
