= Andrea J. Prasow =

Human rights advocate

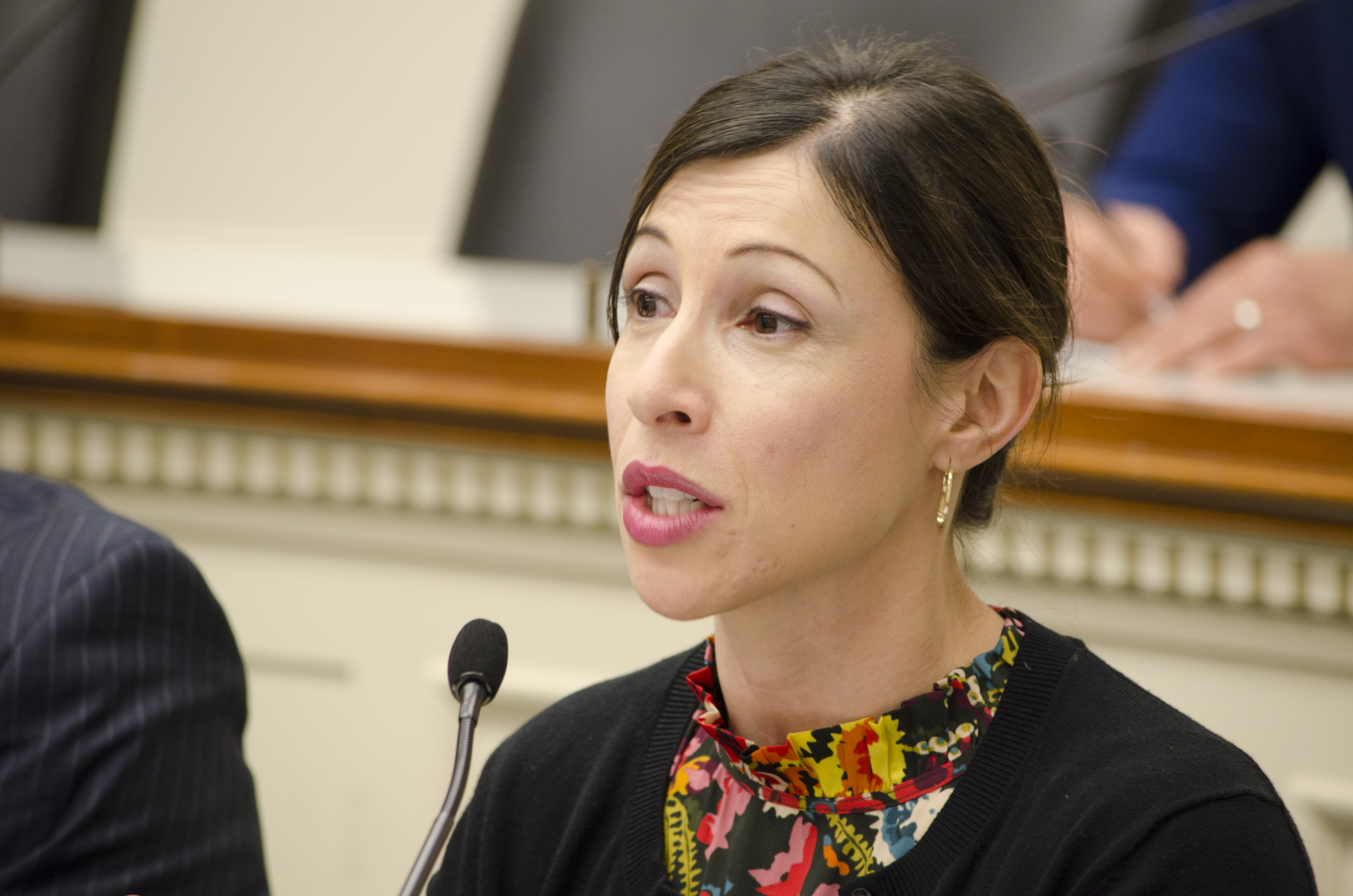
- Born: Toronto, Canada
- Citizenship: American, Canadian
- Education: Juris Doctor, Bachelor of Arts
- Alma mater: Georgetown University Law Center, University of Toronto
- Occupations: human rights advocate, attorney
- Website: andreaprasow.com

Andrea J. Prasow is an American attorney and global human rights advocate. She is the Executive Director of Freedom Now, a human rights organization based in Washington, D.C. Freedom Now announced her selection in December 2023, and she was slated to begin serving in the position on January 2, 2024.

She formerly led The Freedom Initiative, a U.S.-based organization whose mission is "to bring international attention to the plight of political prisoners in the Middle East and advocate for their release." Prasow was appointed as The Freedom Initiative's executive director in November 2021.

She previously worked for 12 years with Human Rights Watch and before that served as an attorney with a focus on the rights of individuals detained in the "war on terror".

When she was with the firm Paul, Weiss, Rifkind, Wharton & Garrison, Prasow represented Saudi detainees in their petition for habeas corpus. Later as a defense attorney with the Office of Military Commissions, Prasow worked on behalf of Salim Ahmed Hamdan, one of the first Guantanamo captives to face formal charges before the Guantanamo military commissions. Subsequently, Prasow became a senior counsel with the Terrorism and Counterterrorism Program at Human Rights Watch. In that capacity Prasow investigates and analyzes U.S. counterterrorism policies and practices, and leads advocacy efforts urging the U.S. to implement policies that respect international standards of human rights. Prasow has written several pieces about the current military commission proceedings and her travels to Afghanistan to observe the newly public Detainee Review Boards held at the Detention Facility in Parwan.

== Education ==
Prasow was raised in Toronto, Ontario, Canada, and received her B.A. from the University of Toronto in 1999. From 1999 to 2000, Prasow worked for the University Health Network in Toronto, where she investigated workplace harassment claims and provided training on sexual harassment issues at the University of Toronto. Prasow then received her J.D. at the Georgetown University Law Center in 2003.

== Legal career ==
Prasow was a litigation associate of Paul, Weiss, Rifkind, Wharton & Garrison LLP until 2005. There she worked in civil litigation and took on a variety of pro bono cases. It was in this capacity that Prasow took on the representation of ten Saudi detainees at Guantanamo Bay in their habeas corpus proceedings in federal court.

Prasow then moved to the Office of the Chief Defense Counsel, Office of Military Commissions, United States Department of Defense. Here she served as Assistant Defense Counsel for Salim Ahmed Hamdan's case before a Guantanamo military commission. During this case, she requested permission for a member of the Hamdan defense team to travel to secretive Camp 7. Hamdan's defense team sought the testimony of fourteen high value detainees held there, although several of the detainees declined because they believed the request was some kind of trick.

Prasow later joined Human Rights Watch as senior counsel in their Terrorism and Counterterrorism Program. In that capacity Prasow traveled to Guantanamo to observe the December 3, 2009 hearing of Ibrahim Ahmed Mahmoud al Qosi. She was later invited to write a guest column in The Jurist with her critique of the proceedings. In her column Prasow was critical of Lieutenant Colonel Nancy Paul, al Qosi's Presiding Officer, for going forward with al Qosi's commission despite the fact that the rules of procedure for the new commission had not yet been drafted.

Prasow was also one of the lawyers profiled in Mark Denbeaux and Jonathan Hafetz's book, The Guantanamo Lawyers: Inside a Prison Outside the Law. In the book, Prasow is quoted about the steps she took so as not to offend potentially conservative Muslim clients. She also references the disparity in treatment of lawyers in these cases, particularly between lawyers working on the detainees' habeas petitions and lawyers defending the detainees before the Guantanamo military commissions.

== Speaking engagements ==
In February 2007, the Washington College of Law invited Prasow to attend a panel discussion on military commissions with Chief Prosecutor Morris Davis and Eugene Fidell, the President of the National Institute of Military Justice.

In June 2009, Prasow was an invited speaker at an event organized by the American Society of International Law. The event, entitled "Women in International Law Networking Breakfast". was also attended by Kristine Huskey, Laura Black and Andrea Menaker.

In May 2010, Prasow addressed the Canadian Parliament's Special Committee on the Canadian Mission in Afghanistan on the use of torture by the Afghan government.
