= Boycott of Guantanamo Military Commissions =

Detainee-led protest against Guantanamo military tribunal system

The sign waved by Ali al-Bahlul declaring a boycott at his 2006 hearing

In 2006, after charges were laid against a number of detainees held in the Guantanamo Bay detention camps, a boycott against the judicial hearings was declared by Ali al-Bahlul. The boycott gained momentum in 2008 when more detainees faced Guantanamo military commissions

The boycott has threatened the future of the tribunals, and reduced the credibility of the Military Commissions Act of 2006 as prisoners have resolved not to cooperate or recognise the American military proceedings, amidst claims that the tribunals were not impartial, the detainees had been abused or tortured into giving false confessions, and would find each detainee "Guilty" regardless of the facts. Public confidence in the fairness of the trials reached all-time lows after the boycotts began.

Organised by the detainees themselves, American military defence attorneys have blamed peer pressure for convincing other prisoners to join the process.

Six of the charged prisoners have appeared before a judge in 2008, and five of them declared their intentions to boycott the proceedings. The Canadian Omar Khadr, accused of throwing a grenade when he was 15 years old, is the only detainee facing charges who is not currently boycotting the hearings, as his lawyers have stressed this shows that he is not a threat and will "play by the rules" if released. He was, however, a former member of the boycott, announcing his intentions to boycott in March 2006.

== Detainees facing charges who have joined the boycott ==
- Ali Hamza Ahmad Sulayman al-Bahlul, accused of making videos glorifying al-Qaeda attacks
- Mohamed Jawad, accused of throwing a grenade when he was 17 years old
- Salim Hamdan, accused of acting as a chauffeur to Osama bin Laden, announced his boycott on April 29, 2008, after years of cooperation, stating that "America tells the whole world that it has freedom and justice. I do not see that...There are almost 100 detainees here. We do not see any rights. You do not give us the least bit of humanity...Give me a just court...Try me with a just law."
