= Nancy J. Paul =

Nancy J. Paul is an officer in the United States Air Force.

== Education ==
education.
date	institution
	Associate of Science, Cypress College, Cypress, California
	Bachelor of Science, University of Nebraska Omaha, Omaha, Nebraska
	Juris Doctor, Creighton University School of Law, Omaha, Nebraska
1994	Squadron Officer School, Residence Program
1999	Air Command and Staff College, Seminar Program
2004	Air War College, Seminar Program

== Military career ==
Paul received a direct commission into the United States Air Force as a Judge Advocate General in 1988.

Lieutenant Colonel Paul is notable for her appointment as a Presiding Officer for a Guantanamo military commission. Paul is the most junior officer appointed to serve as a Presiding Officer. All the other Presiding Officers are full Colonels or Captains in the United States Navy.

=== Presided over Ibrahim Ahmed Mahmoud Al Qosi's Commission ===
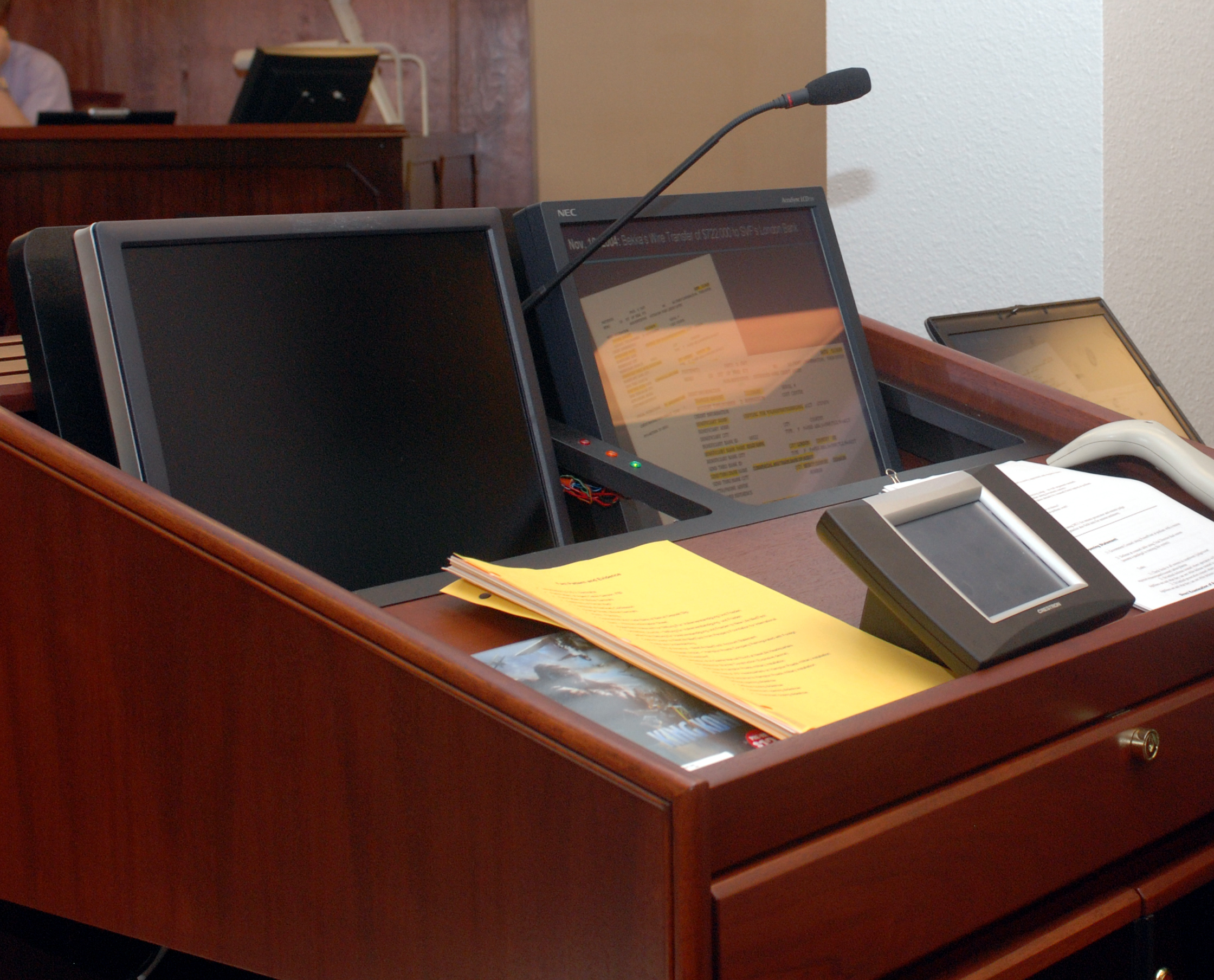
The Guantanamo military commission audio system, which has the ability to cut the sound to reporters when witnesses are testifying about classified topics, failed to let reporters hear Padgett's introduction to the court on July 15, 2009.

Paul was appointed the Presiding Officer of Ibrahim Ahmed Mahmoud Al Qosi's military commission in early 2008. On May 22, 2008, after hearing that Al Qosi didn't trust his assigned military lawyer, and had refused to meet with her, and had not been allowed to communicate with his family she ordered that a phone call be arranged, so they could secure civilian lawyers to aid in his defense. This order stirred controversy when Pauline Storum, a Guantanamo spokesman falsely claimed the next day that the call had already been completed.

At his July 2009 hearing the court's new audio equipment malfunctioned.

The Obama Presidency requested a series of continuances, so it could study alternatives to the military commission system. Paul granted a final continuance on October 21, 2009.

On December 3, 2009, Paul convened the first hearing of a military commission following the October 2009 passage of the Military Commissions Act of 2009. She ruled that the charges against Al Qosi should be limited to crimes he was alleged to have committed in Afghanistan. She ruled that crimes he was alleged to have committed when al Qaeda was based in Sudan were beyond the mandate of the military commission system.

Carol Rosenberg, writing in the Miami Herald, reported that Paul scheduled hearings for January 6, 2010, to determine whether Al Qosi met the eligibility criteria laid out in the Military Commissions Act of 2006. Rosenberg described Paul as the first Presiding Officer of a Military Commission to address changes the US Congress set in place in the Military Commissions Act of 2009.

Andrea Prasow, a senior counsel with Human Rights Watch, was critical of Paul for proceeding with the Commission, even though the rules of procedure hadn't been drafted.
