= Abdullah Tabarak Ahmad =

Moroccan prisoner in Guantanamo

- Born: December 12, 1955 (age 70); Casablanca, Morocco
- Detained at: Guantanamo Bay camp
- Other names: Abdallah Tabarak, Abu Assim al-Maghrebi
- ISN: 56
- Status: Released and living in Morocco
- Occupation: Former Moroccan transit worker
- Children: Daughter, Asia, married a top al-Qaeda operations commander, Abu Faraj al-Libbi; Daughter, Miriam, married al-Qaeda operative Ibrahim al-Qosi; Son, Omar, fought alongside the Taliban in Afghanistan in late 2001 and was captured by Afghan allies of the Americans but later freed in a prisoner exchange.

Abdullah Tabarak Ahmad (عبدالله تبارك أحمد) (Guantanamo detainee ID was 56) is a citizen of Morocco, who was held in extrajudicial detention in the United States Guantanamo Bay detainment camps, in Cuba. The Department of Defense reports that Ahmad was born on December 12, 1955, in Casablanca, Morocco.

Abdullah Tabarak was captured near the Pakistan-Afghan border in December 2001 and he was transferred to Morocco on July 1, 2003.

== Allegations ==
Tabarak is alleged to have been one of Osama bin Laden's guards. He is alleged to have volunteered to have taken bin Laden's satellite phone, in order to sacrifice himself, by diverting the attention of US authorities, allowing bin Laden to escape from Tora Bora.

== Access denied ==
The Red Cross reported that Tabarak was one of the detainees that they were not allowed access to. A memo from a meeting held on October 9, 2003, summarizing a meeting between General Geoffrey Miller and his staff and Vincent Cassard of the International Committee of the Red Cross (ICRC), acknowledged that camp authorities were not permitting the ICRC to have access to Ahmad, due to "military necessity".

== Release to Morocco ==
In August 2004, Abdullah Tabarak Ahmad was released from Guantanamo to Morocco police custody where he was then released four months later on bail. Security analysts puzzled over the release as camp commander General Geoffrey Miller on February 2, 2004, told the Red Cross that Tabarak was the sole remaining detainee they would not be allowed access to and the Moroccan authorities described him as the emir of Guantanamo.

== December 15, 2001 capture ==
Tabarak was captured on December 15, 2001, or December 16, 2001, together with approximately thirty other Arabs trying to cross the Afghan-Pakistan border. Tabarak was described as one of four "major prizes" among these Arab captives—a follower of Osama bin Laden, who had worked on his farm in Sudan, and followed him to Afghanistan. The other three men, Ali Hamza al-Bahlul, Ibrahim al-Qosi, and Mohammed al-Qahtani were all to face charges before Guantanamo military commissions. Tabarak, on the other hand, was among the first captives to be repatriated. Historian Andy Worthington, author of The Guantanamo Files, speculated as to whether Tabarak's early release was a tacit admission that Tabarak had played a more peripheral role than first imagined.

== Role described during Salim Hamdan's Tribunal ==
On July 24, 2008, Michael St. Ours, a Naval Criminal Investigative Service agent, testified during his interrogation of Salim Ahmed Hamdan, an alleged Osama bin Laden bodyguard and driver, that Hamdan revealed that Abdellah Tabarak had been in charge of Osama bin Laden's security detail. The Associated Press reported that:

St. Ours, who also questioned Tabarak at Guantanamo, said he was surprised to learn from Hamdan's lawyers that the Moroccan had been released because he was a "very hard individual."

According to Carol Rosenberg of the Miami Herald St Ours "looked stunned" when Hamdan's Defense Counsel asked him if he knew that Tabarak had been released without charge.

Andrew Cohen, a legal affairs commentator for CBS News, called the testimony that Tabarak had been released a "colossal embarrassment". He commented:

Oops. Bet the Administration would rather have Tabarak on trial than Hamdan.
