= Thomas Fleener =

American military officer and lawyer

Thomas Fleener is an American military officer and lawyer. Fleener, a major in the United States Army Reserve, has been appointed to serve as a defense lawyer in the Guantanamo military commissions. He has been appointed to serve as the defense lawyer for Ali Hamza Ahmed Sulayman al Bahlul.

== Career and noteworthy cases ==
In his civilian capacity, Fleener is an attorney in his own law firm in Wyoming. A former Federal Public Defender, Fleener continues to serve in the Reserves as a Judge Advocate with the 22d Legal Support Organization, Trial Defense Service, defending soldiers accused of misconduct. He is a member of the bars of Iowa and Wyoming. Prior to becoming a Federal Public Defender, Fleener served on active duty as an Army Judge Advocate for nearly eight years in both the United States and Europe. Prior to attending college and law school in Arkansas, Fleener also served on active duty as an enlisted soldier.

Though Al Bahlul has consistently insisted that he wants to represent himself or be represented by a Yemeni attorney, the United States Defense Department's Office of Military Commissions ruled that military defense counsel must represent defendants according to military commission rules.

Fleener understands Al Bahlul's wish to defend himself, agrees he should have that right, and said that forcing counsel upon the defendant "may give the appearance to the outside world that I am here not to serve as Mr. al Bahlul's attorney, rather simply to add some air of legitimacy to an otherwise wholly illegitimate process."

In 2006, Fleener said: "For four years they wouldn't let detainees have lawyers; now they're shoving one down his throat."

Fleener and the question whether detainees should be able to represent themselves were featured in the October 2007 issue of the "Yale Law Journal" in an article by Matthew Bloom entitled: "I Did Not Come Here To Defend Myself": Responding to War on Terror Detainees' Attempts To Dismiss Counsel and Boycott the Trial." He was profiled in the August 2007 edition of GQ in an article titled, "The Defense Will Not Rest."

After two years of appearances before the Guantanamo military commissions, Fleener returned to civilian practice, and in 2008 opened a private criminal defense law firm in Laramie, Wyoming.
