= Detention, Treatment, and Trial of Certain Non-Citizens in the War Against Terrorism =

2001 United States military order

On November 13, 2001 U.S. President George W. Bush issued a military order titled Detention, Treatment, and Trial of Certain Non-Citizens in the War Against Terrorism.

The order:

1. Defines which individuals the President considers subject to the order.
2. States that the U.S. Secretary of Defense will be ultimately responsible for the individuals.
3. Outlines the conditions under which the Secretary of Defense should detain the individuals.
4. Specifies that those individuals who were to be tried would be tried before military commissions, and sets out some broad guidelines for how those military commissions should be conducted.
5. Orders other agencies to assist the Secretary of Defense.
6. Grants the Secretary of Defense additional powers.
7. Specifies the relationship of the order to other laws and forums.
8. States that the order will be published in the Federal Register.

== Background and controversy ==
In the aftermath of the September 11 attacks, the Bush administration sought "a tough-minded alternative to the civilian court system" for dealing with terrorists. President Bush asserted that the U.S. Constitution and a congressional resolution passed after the attack empowered him to promulgate the order as president. The order provided the authority for the Secretary of Defense to detain members of Al Qaeda at Guantanamo Bay detention camp.

Critics pointed out that, as of March 2006, none of the cases for the 10 terrorists designated for trial under the order had been concluded. They also argued that the suspects were tried for crimes defined by the President, using procedures "lacking basic protections", by judges who were subordinates of the President. Ultimately the commissions were modified to require that trials be public and defendants be assumed innocent until proven guilty beyond a reasonable doubt. However critics continued to argue that the Geneva Convention required the detainees to be tried in federal court with habeas corpus. The Bush administration countered that Al Qaeda is a terrorist network that has not signed the Geneva Convention and does not abide by it.

== Judicial branch ruled the commissions unconstitutional ==
US District Court Justice James Robertson ruled, in Hamdan v. Rumsfeld, that the military commissions were unconstitutional. A three-judge appeals panel overturned Robertson's ruling. President Bush appointed John Roberts, one of the judges on that panel, to the vacant post of Chief Justice of the United States on the next business day. Justice John Roberts had to recuse himself when the appeal appeared before the United States Supreme Court. On June 29, 2006, the Supreme Court upheld Robertson's initial ruling 5–3. That ruling was later superseded by the Military Commissions Act of 2006.

== March 13 standard ==
Charlie Savage points to a more legalized understanding of which individuals could be detained under the Authorization for Use of Military Force under the Obama administration. He states that the standard became known as the "March 13 standard." It is in reference to a memorandum regarding the United States Government's detention of detainees held at Guantanamo Bay detention camp.

The standard put forth in the memo for determining whether an individual could be detained (outside of those individuals directly tied into the September 11 attacks) is if the person:

- Was part of
  - the Taliban or
  - al-Qaida forces or
  - associated forces that are engaged in hostilities against the United States or its coalition partners, including any person who has committed a belligerent act, or has directly supported hostilities, in aid of such enemy armed forces; or
- Substantially supported
  - the Taliban or
  - al-Qaida forces or
  - associated forces that are engaged in hostilities against the United States or its coalition partners, including any person who has committed a belligerent act, or has directly supported hostilities, in aid of such enemy armed forces.
