= Ali al-Bahlul =

Al Qaeda operative

Ali Hamza Ahmad Suliman al-Bahlul
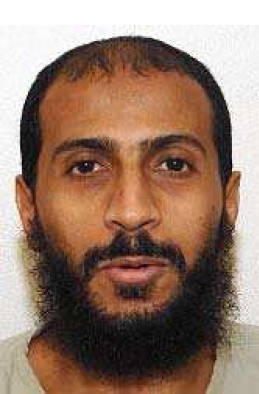
- Official Guantanamo picture
- Born: September 11, 1969 (age 57); Al Hudaydah, North Yemen
- Detained at: Guantanamo (since 2002)
- Other names: Ali Hamza Ahmed Sulayman Ismail; Ali Hamza Ahmed Suleiman al Bahlul; Anas al-Mekki; Abu Annas al-Yemeni
- ISN: 39
- Charges: convicted in November 2008 of conspiring with Al-Qaeda, soliciting murder and providing material support for terrorism; conviction overturned on January 25, 2013; conviction re-affirmed on October 20, 2016
- Status: detained at the Guantanamo Bay detention camp

Ali Hamza Ahmad Suliman al-Bahlul (Arabic: علي حمزة أحمد سليمان البهلول; born September 11, 1969) is a Yemeni citizen who has been held as an enemy combatant since 2002 in the United States Guantanamo Bay detention camp. He boycotted the Guantanamo Military Commissions, arguing that there was no legal basis for the military tribunals to judge him.

He was convicted in November 2008 of performing media relations for Osama bin Laden, the founder of al-Qaeda, and sentenced to life imprisonment, after a jury of nine military officers deliberated for less than an hour.

The United States Court of Appeals for the District of Columbia Circuit overturned most of his convictions on January 25, 2013. In October 2016, a divided D.C. Circuit affirmed Bahlul's final remaining conviction, which was for criminal conspiracy. In October 2017, the U.S. Supreme Court denied Bahlul's petition for a writ of certiorari.

== Background ==
Joint Task Force Guantanamo counter-terrorism analysts describe Ali Hamza Ahmad Suliman al-Bahlul as al Qaeda's public relations director. He is alleged to have created propaganda videos glorifying attacks against the United States. He set up a satellite receiver for Osama bin Laden, the leader of the terrorist organization, to listen to live radio coverage of the September 11, 2001 attacks in the United States.

He was captured on 15 December 2001 near Parachinar while trying to enter Pakistan from Afghanistan and was transferred to US custody on 26 December 2001.

He faced charges before the first Guantanamo military commissions, before the United States Supreme Court ruled that they were unconstitutional under existing executive authority. In 2004, he was held in solitary confinement.

== Official status reviews ==
Following the ruling of the Supreme Court of the United States in Rasul v. Bush the Department of Defense was instructed to set up a system where Guantanamo captives would be informed as to why they were being held. The DoD set up the Office for the Administrative Review of Detained Enemy Combatants (OARDEC). OARDEC conducted annual reviews from 2004 to 2008. Scholars at the Brookings Institution, led by Benjamin Wittes, listed the captives still held in Guantanamo in December 2008, according to whether their detention was justified by certain common allegations:

Ali Hamza Ahmad Suliman al-Bahlul was listed as one of the captives who:

- had faced charges before a military commission.
- the military alleges were members of either al Qaeda or the Taliban and associated with the other group.
- "The military alleges ... traveled to Afghanistan for jihad."
- "The military alleges that the following detainees stayed in Al Qaeda, Taliban or other guest- or safehouses."
- "The military alleges ... took military or terrorist training in Afghanistan."
- "The military alleges ... fought for the Taliban."
- "The military alleges ... served on Osama Bin Laden’s security detail."
- was a member of the "al Qaeda leadership cadre".
- is "currently at Guantánamo who have been charged before military commissions and are alleged Al Qaeda leaders."
- is one of "36 [captives who] openly admit either membership or significant association with Al Qaeda, the Taliban, or some other group the government considers militarily hostile to the United States."
- is one of the captives who had admitted "being [an] Al Qaeda leader."

== Charged before a military commission ==
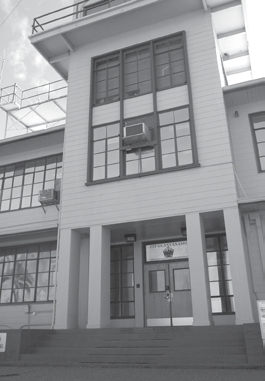
The original ten Presidentially authorized military commissions were convened in the former terminal building in the discontinued airfield on the Guantanamo Naval Base's Eastern Peninsula.

Bahlul faced charges before a Guantanamo military commission prior to the United States Supreme Court ruling in Hamdan v. Rumsfeld (2006) that the Bush Presidency lacked the constitutional authority to create military commissions that, without adequate justification, substantially deviated from the rules of procedure and evidence applicable at U.S. courts-martial. He was indicted along with Ibrahim Ahmed Mahmoud al Qosi. Lieutenant Commander Philip Sundel, his first military defense attorney, described the difficulty in getting a security clearance for a translator to talk to his client. Sundel told CBS News: "There's virtually no chance he can get a fair trial."

Bahlul asked Peter Brownback, the president of the commissions, if he could represent himself. Al Bahlul and the question of whether detainees should be able to represent themselves were featured in the October 2007 issue of the Yale Law Journal in an article by Matthew Bloom entitled: "I Did Not Come Here To Defend Myself: Responding to War on Terror Detainees' Attempts To Dismiss Counsel and Boycott the Trial". His most recent military lawyer was Major Thomas Fleener.

After the Supreme Court ruling, Congress passed the Military Commissions Act of 2006, to authorize military commissions at Guantanamo to hear and judge detainee cases. On February 9, 2008, Bahlul and Ibrahim Ahmed Mahmoud Al Qosi were charged before military commissions.

Carol Rosenberg of the Miami Herald, reported that Bahlul would be allowed to represent himself before the newly authorized military commissions, although he was not previously allowed to do so before the Presidentially authorized commissions. David McFadden of the Associated Press reported that only three reporters covered Bahlul's trial, associated with the Miami Herald, the Associated Press, and Reuters. The new law authorized detainees to represent themselves by choice.

=== Testimony of members of the "Buffalo Six" ===
In late October 2008, three of the men from the group known as the "Buffalo Six" testified at Bahlul's Guantanamo military commissions. They testified on having been shown a two-hour video that Bahlul produced.

=== Conviction ===
On November 3, 2008, Bahlul was convicted of conspiring with al-Qaeda, soliciting murder and providing material support for terrorism. At his sentencing, he admitted he was a member of al-Qaeda, and was sentenced to life imprisonment. Through a translator, Bahlul said, "We will fight government that governs America", the AP news agency quoted him as telling the military jurors through a translator. "We are the only ones on Earth who stand against you."

=== Isolation from the other captives ===
Rosenberg has reported that, following his conviction, Al-Bahlul was separated from the other captives. She said that the Department of Defense (DOD) justified the isolation because the "Geneva Conventions ... forbids convicts from being held with war prisoners." The government insists that it can detain Bahlul indefinitely, although without a conviction he may be moved out of isolation.

=== Appeal ===
Rosenberg in the Miami Herald reported that Bahlul's military defense attorneys filed a 50-page appeal of his sentence on grounds of free speech. The appeal was the second filed with the Court for Military Commission Review. Bahlul had boycotted his military commission, so no defense was mounted. He also refused to participate in the appeal.

Rosenberg reported that the Obama Presidency has proposed a change to the process of appeals of the rulings and verdicts of military commissions. The proposed changes would have such appeals first heard by the Court of Appeals for the Armed Forces, which Rosenberg noted was a 58-year-old institution. In the current process, there is no appeal to rulings of the Court of Military Commission Review. Under the proposed changes, appeals could be taken up to the United States Supreme Court.

Jane Sutton, reporting for Reuters, wrote that when Al-Bahlul's conviction was overturned it implied the highest profile trials, those against Khalid Sheikh Mohammed, and four other conspirators, also seemed more likely to face similar challenges. Al-Bahlul's was the second of the seven Guantanamo convictions to be overturned, so far. Salim Ahmed Hamdan, who had only been convicted of "providing material support for terrorism" had his conviction overturned in 2012. In July 2014, the United States Court of Appeals for the D.C. Circuit sitting en banc vacated Bahlul's material support and solicitation convictions as unconstitutional under the ex post facto clause. A panel of the D.C. Circuit vacated Bahlul's remaining conspiracy conviction in June 2015. Judge Judith W. Rogers, joined by David S. Tatel, found that conspiracy is not a crime under the international law of war, with Judge Karen L. Henderson writing a 85-page dissent.

On September 25, 2015, the D.C. Circuit vacated its June judgment and granted the Government's petition for rehearing en banc. The Circuit specifically directed the rehearing would consider the standard of appellate review and as to if Congress's attempts to define and punish war crimes transgresses the Article III powers of courts.

On October 20, 2016, the full D.C. Circuit voted 6–3 to affirm Bahlul's conspiracy conviction. Circuit Judge Brett Kavanaugh, wrote the four-judge plurality opinion for Judges Henderson, Janice Rogers Brown, and Thomas B. Griffith, finding that Congress can make crimes triable before military commissions even if those crimes are not internationally recognized war crimes. Judges Patricia Millett and Robert L. Wilkins, voted to affirm Bahlul's conviction but did not join the plurality's opinion, each writing that the case should be decided on more narrow grounds. Judge Rogers, joined by Judges Tatel and Nina Pillard dissented, writing that the plurality's broad reading was making "room for a new constitutional order." One year later, the Supreme Court of the United States denied Bahlul's petition for a writ of certiorari without comment, with Justice Neil Gorsuch taking no part in considerations.
