= W. Thomas Cumbie =

- Born: William Thomas Cumbie; June 3, 1957 (age 69); Gainesville, Florida, U.S.
- Education: Florida State University (BA, JD)
- Military career
- Allegiance: United States
- Branch: United States Air Force
- Service years: 1985-Present
- Rank: Colonel
- Unit: United States Air Force Judge Advocate General's Corps
- Awards: Meritorious Service Medal (6)

William Thomas Cumbie (born June 3, 1957) is an American military veteran and judge. He is a senior judge in the United States Air Force. Cumbie is the United States Air Force's Chief Regional Military Judge, for the Atlantic Region. Cumbie graduated from the law school of Florida State University in 1982. He served as a staff attorney for the Florida State Senate. Cumbie became an officer by direct appointment, in 1985.

== Education ==
Education
1979	Bachelor of Arts degree in criminology, Florida State University, Florida
1982	Juris Doctor, Florida State University, Florida
1987	Squadron Officer School (Residence), Maxwell Air Force Base, Alabama
1995	Air Command and Staff College (Correspondence), Maxwell Air Force Base, Alabama
1996	Air Command and Staff College (Residence), Maxwell Air Force Base, Alabama
2001	Air War College (Correspondence), Maxwell Air Force Base, Alabama

== Career ==
- August 1985-August 1986: Chief, Civil Law, 834th Combat Support Group, Hurlburt Field, Florida
- August 1986-April 1988: Area Defense Counsel, Hurlburt Field, Florida
- April 1988-May 1990: Circuit Defense Counsel, Travis Air Force Base, California
- May 1990-June 1993: Deputy Staff Judge Advocate, 437th Airlift Wing, Charleston AFB, South Carolina
- June 1993-July 1995: Chief Military Justice, Headquarters Second Air Force, Keesler Air Force Base, Mississippi
- July 1995-June 1996: Student, Air Command and Staff College, Maxwell Air Force Base, Alabama
- June 1996-July 1998: Staff Judge Advocate, 47th Flying Training Wing, Laughlin Air Force Base, Texas
- July 1998-July 2001: Military Judge, Travis Air Force Base, California

== Devery Taylor case ==
In 2007 Cumbie presided over the case of Captain Devery L. Taylor, an Air Force officer who was accused of administering GHB, the "date-rape" drug, to half a dozen men, and then raping or attempting to rape them.

== Presiding Officer, Guantanamo ==
Cumbie is notable for his appointment as a Presiding Officer for Guantanamo captive Mohammed Kamin's military commission. On May 21, 2008, Cumbie ordered Kamin to be forcibly removed from his cell, to attend his first hearing. Four guards brought Kamin into the hearing room in four point restraints, and then shackled him, hand and foot, to his chair. Cumbie informed observers that the restraints were necessary because: "Mr. Kamin was not cooperative with the MPs and in fact attempted to spit on and bite one of the guards."

According to Carol Rosenberg, writing in the Miami Herald, Kamin's assigned counsel Lieutenant Rich Federico said his face was visibly injured when he was brought into the hearing room.

When Federico told Cumbie that he had only learned the day before the hearing that Kamin's medical records, which had been withheld from him, might document that Kamin was mentally ill, and asked Cumbie to order those records to be released to him, Cumbie replied: "Let me think that one over and get back to you".

When Federico raised ethical concerns over representing a client, against his will, Cumbie assured Federico that he had no ethical doubts, and ordered Federico to continue to serve as Kamin's counsel.
