= Peter Brownback =

American military officer (1920–2012)

Peter Evans Brownback III
- Born: December 14, 1920; Philadelphia, Pennsylvania, U.S.
- Died: May 18, 2012 (aged 91)
- Military career
- Allegiance: United States of America
- Branch: United States Army
- Service years: 1942-1980
- Rank: Colonel
- Unit: 11th Airborne Division 173rd Brigade
- Conflicts: Vietnam War
- Other work: Presiding Officer; Lawyer

Peter Evans Brownback III (December 14, 1920 – May 18, 2012) was an American military officer and lawyer. He was appointed in 2004 by general John D. Altenburg as a Presiding Officer on the Guantanamo military commissions. The Washington Post reported: "...that Brownback and Altenburg have known each other since 1977, that Brownback's wife worked for Altenburg, and that Altenburg hosted Brownback's retirement party in 1999."

Brownback was also a combat veteran who served two tours in Vietnam, the first as part of the 173rd Brigade and later as a member of the US Special Forces. He was the honour graduate of his special forces course that he completed in 1972. Defense attorneys challenged the bias of five of the six presiding officers at the Guantanamo military tribunal, including Brownback. Altenburg removed three officers but retained Brownback. He was the only officer appointed to the first commission who had any legal training.

== Dismissed charges against Omar Khadr ==
In the summer of 2006, the United States Supreme Court overturned the then current version of the Guantanamo military commission on constitutional grounds. The Supreme Court had ruled that, under the separation of powers, the Bush Presidency lacked the constitutional authority to institute military commissions. The Supreme Court however, did rule that the United States Congress did have the constitutional authority to legislate such military commissions.

In the fall of 2006, Congress passed the Military Commissions Act, which authorized military commissions similar to those the Supreme Court overturned, to try "unlawful enemy combatants". Brownback and Captain Keith J. Allred, ruled that, since Khadr and Salim Ahmed Hamdan's Combatant Status Review Tribunals had not determined that they were "unlawful enemy combatants", but merely "enemy combatants", the commissions lacked jurisdiction to try them.

On June 4, 2007, in a move the BBC described as a "stunning blow" to the Bush Presidency's detainee policy, Brownback dismissed all charges against Canadian youth Omar Khadr. By June 2007, none of the Guantanamo captives had had a "competent tribunal", such as the AR-190-8 Tribunal, determine whether they broke any of the laws of war that would result in stripping them of the protections of Geneva Conventions Prisoner of War status.

== November 2007 Guantanamo Military Commission hearings ==
An appeal court determined that the Presidents of Military Commissions had the authority to determine whether the captives were lawful combatants. Brownback reconvened Khadr's proceedings on Thursday, November 8, 2007. Before Brownback determined whether Khadr was an unlawful combatant, lawyers were allowed to challenge the official as to whether he was an appropriate person to sit as Khadr's judge. Brownback postponed ruling on Khadr's combatant status, giving attorneys more time for preparation. The next two sessions were scheduled for December 7, 2007 and January 13, 2008.

== Replaced ==
Brownback chastised the prosecution telling them "they had to provide Khadr's defence lawyers with records of his confinement at the detention camp in Guantanamo Bay, Cuba, or he would suspend the proceedings." On May 29, 2008 the military suddenly announced that a new officer was appointed to replace Brownback as judge in the Khadr case. Reuters noted that "The dismissal came on the same day that Pentagon prosecutors filed new charges against three other Guantanamo prisoners and defense lawyers accused the prosecutors of trying to rush cases to trial before the November U.S. presidential election."

== Death ==
Brownback died on May 18, 2012, at the age of 91.
