= Enemy Belligerent Interrogation, Detention, and Prosecution Act of 2010 =

The Enemy Belligerent Interrogation, Detention, and Prosecution Act of 2010 (S. 3081) is a bill introduced by United States Senator John McCain, sponsored by Joe Lieberman and eight other Republican senators. Its counterpart in the House is H.R. 4892, introduced by Howard McKeon (R-CA).

In introducing the bill on the Senate floor, McCain said:

This legislation seeks to ensure that the mistakes made during the apprehension of the Christmas Day bomber, such as reading him a Miranda warning, will never happen again and put Americans’ security at risk.

According to the legal news service JURIST both the American Civil Liberties Union and Republican Senator Lindsey Graham expressed concerns over the proposed bill.

== The Bill ==
According to the bill's official summary, the bill requires that any person who is arrested on suspicion of terrorism against the United States or its coalition partners be placed in military custody for the purposes of initial interrogation and determination of status as an "unprivileged enemy belligerent". Such determination is to be made within 48 hours.

The bill proceeds to define an "unprivileged enemy belligerent" as an individual who:

1. has engaged in hostilities against the United States or its coalition partners;
2. has purposely and materially supported hostilities against the United States or its coalition partners; or
3. was a part of al Qaeda at the time of capture.

The bill authorizes the President to establish a "high-value detainee interrogation group" consisting of executive branch personnel with expertise in national security, terrorism, intelligence, interrogation, or law enforcement to perform the interrogation and status determination.

The bill defines that the paramount purpose of such interrogations is the protection of U.S. civilians and facilities through thorough and professional interrogation for intelligence purposes. It further prohibits the use of Department of Justice (DOJ) appropriated funds to prosecute an unprivileged enemy belligerent in an Article III court.

Finally, the bill allows for the detention of a person who is deemed to be an unprivileged enemy belligerent without criminal charges or trial for the duration of hostilities against the United States or its coalition partners in which the individual has engaged or which the individual has purposely and materially supported.

== Co-sponsors ==
S.3081 was co-sponsored in the Senate by:

- Scott Brown [MA]
- Saxby Chambliss [GA]
- James Inhofe [OK]
- George LeMieux [FL]
- Jeff Sessions [AL]
- John Thune [SD]
- David Vitter [LA]
- Roger Wicker [MS]

== See also ==
- Detainee Treatment Act
- Military Commissions Act of 2006
- Military Commissions Act of 2009
- Alien and Sedition Act
- Third Geneva Convention Relative to the Treatment of Prisoners of War
- al-Qaeda
