= Military Commissions Act of 2009 =

United States Law

The Military Commissions Act of 2009, which amended the Military Commissions Act of 2006, was passed to address concerns by the United States Supreme Court. In Boumediene v. Bush (2008) the court had ruled that section 7 of the Military Commissions Act of 2006 was unconstitutional in suspending the right of detainees to habeas corpus. The court ruled that detainees had the right to access US federal courts to challenge their detentions.

Formally, the amended act is Title XVIII of the National Defense Authorization Act for Fiscal Year 2010 (Pub. L. 111–84 (text) (PDF), H.R. 2647, 123 Stat. 2190, enacted October 28, 2009).

On December 3, 2009, Carol Rosenberg, of the Miami Herald, reported on a hearing before Lieutenant Colonel Nancy Paul, the Presiding Officer of the Military Commission for US v. Al Qosi. She wrote that Paul was the first Presiding Officer to address the implications of the new act. Paul ruled that the Prosecution could not use the new act to place additional charges against Sudanese captive Ibrahim al Qosi.

The Department of Defense had released a 281-page set of procedures for conducting military commissions in accordance with the Military Commissions Act of 2009 on May 4, 2010. This was one day before the first new hearing in the case of the Canadian citizen Omar Khadr, who had been detained since 2002 at Guantanamo and was the last Western citizen held. On May 24, 2010, Steven Edwards, writing for the Vancouver Sun, reported that the Canwest News Service had recently learned that there was internal controversy within the Obama administration over the new rules for conducting Guantanamo military commissions. According to Edwards, some Obama appointees had tried to get new rules that would have caused the Prosecution to abandon charging Guantanamo captives such as Omar Khadr with murder. Edwards wrote that the change would have triggered dropping charges against a third of the Guantanamo captives whom the Prosecution planned to charge with murder.

== See also ==
- Detainee Treatment Act
- Military Commissions Act of 2006
- Enemy Belligerent Interrogation, Detention, and Prosecution Act of 2010
