= Salim Hamdan =

Yemeni Guantanamo detainee (born 1968)

Salim Ahmed Salim Hamdan
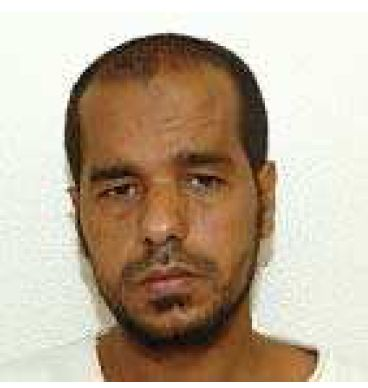
- Born: February 25, 1968 (age 58); Wadi Hadhramaut, Yemen
- Detained at: Guantanamo Bay camp
- Other name: Saqr al-Jedawi
- ISN: 149
- Alleged to be a member of: al-Qaeda
- Charge(s): Conspiracy and providing material support for terrorism
- Status: Released in December 2008; Conviction vacated in 2012
- Spouse: Amat Al Saboor Ali Qassan
- Children: Two daughters born 2000, 2002

Salim Ahmed Salim Hamdan (Arabic: سالم احمد سالم حمدان, romanized: Sālim Aḥmad Sālim Ḥamdān; born February 25, 1968) is a Yemeni man, captured during the invasion of Afghanistan, declared by the United States government to be an illegal enemy combatant and held as a detainee at Guantanamo Bay from 2002 to November 2008. He admits to being Osama bin Laden's personal driver and said he needed the money.

He was originally charged by a military tribunal with "conspiracy and providing material support for terrorism," but the process of military tribunals was challenged in a case that went to the US Supreme Court. In Hamdan v. Rumsfeld (2006), the Court ruled that the military commissions as set up by the United States Department of Defense (DOD) were flawed and unconstitutional. The DOD continued to hold Hamdan as an enemy combatant at Guantanamo.

After passage of the Military Commissions Act of 2006, Hamdan was tried on revised charges beginning July 21, 2008, the first of the detainees to be tried under the new system. He was found guilty of "providing material support" to al Qaeda, but was acquitted by the jury of terrorism conspiracy charges. He was sentenced to five-and-a-half years of imprisonment by the military jury, which credited him for his detention as having already served five years of the sentence. A Pentagon spokesman noted then that the DOD might still classify Hamdan as an "enemy combatant" after he completed his sentence, and detain him indefinitely.

In November 2008, the U.S. transferred Hamdan to Yemen to serve out the remaining month of his sentence. He was released by the government there on January 8, 2009, permitting him to live with his family in Sanaa. On October 16, 2012, Hamdan's entire conviction was overturned on appeal in the US Court of Appeals in Washington, D.C., and he was acquitted of all charges.

Hamdan and his brother-in-law Nasser al-Bahri were the subjects of the award-winning documentary, The Oath (2010), by the American director Laura Poitras, which explored their time in al-Qaeda and later struggles.

== Early life ==
Salim Hamdan was born in 1968 in Wadi Hadhramaut, Yemen. He was raised as a Muslim.

He married and had daughters with his wife. He went to Afghanistan to work, where he was recruited to al-Qaeda by Nasser al-Bahri, also a Yemeni. Hamdan had first worked on an agricultural project started by Osama bin Laden. He started working as his driver because he needed the money.

== Capture in Afghanistan ==
Salim Hamdan was captured in southern Afghanistan on November 24, 2001. According to documents obtained by the Associated Press, he was captured in a car with four other alleged al-Qaeda associates, including Osama bin Laden's son-in-law. Three of the men were killed in a firefight with Afghan forces. The Afghans turned over Hamdan and the other surviving associate in the car to U.S. forces. Initially held in Afghanistan, he was transferred to then newly opened Guantanamo Bay detention camp in 2002.

== Trial timeline ==
On July 14, 2004, the Department of Defense formally charged Salim Ahmed Hamdan with conspiracy, for trial by military commission under the President's Executive Order of November 13, 2001. On October 22, 2004, General John D. Altenburg, the retired officer in overall charge of the commissions, removed three of the six original Military Commission members to avoid the potential of bias.

On November 8, 2004, the United States District Court for the District of Columbia halted Hamdan's military commission because no "competent tribunal" had determined whether Mr Hamdan was a POW (as required by the Geneva Conventions), and because regardless of such determination, the commission violated the procedures of the Uniform Code of Military Justice (UCMJ). The Bush administration appealed the ruling.

In the meantime, the Department of Defense started Combatant Status Review Tribunals of all the Guantanamo detainees to determine whether each was an enemy combatant or not. The tribunals extended from July 2004 through March 2005.

On July 17, 2005, a three-judge panel on the United States Court of Appeals for the District of Columbia Circuit overturned the lower court's ruling against the military commission, and supported the government. The panel said that the Geneva Convention does not apply to members of al-Qaeda. John Roberts, soon to be appointed as Chief Justice of the Supreme Court, was then one of the judges on the Court of Appeals. He voted for the government's position.

The military commissions were set back in motion at Guantanamo.

Responding to an appeal by Hamdan's attorneys, on November 7, 2005, the Supreme Court issued a writ of certiorari, agreeing to review the decision of the DC Circuit Court. Roberts, now on the Supreme Court, recused himself due to his earlier participation in the case. On June 29, 2006, the Supreme Court ruled in Hamdan v. Rumsfeld that the military commissions had procedural flaws and were invalid, as they violated the UCMJ and protections of the Geneva Convention adopted in both the US civil and military systems of law.

== Supreme Court opinion ==
On June 29, 2006, the Supreme Court ruled in Hamdan v. Rumsfeld. It also considered whether the Supreme Court had the jurisdiction to enforce the articles of the 1949 Geneva convention and whether Congress had the power to prevent the Court from reviewing the case of an accused enemy combatant before it was tried by a military commission, as had happened in this case. It asserted it had that authority.

In a 5-3 plurality, the Court held that the military commissions lacked "the power to proceed because their structures and procedures violate both the Uniform Code of Military Justice and the four Geneva Conventions signed in 1949." (As the US had signed them, it effectively adopted them as law.) Specifically, the Court ruled that Common Article 3 of the Third Geneva Convention was the provision violated.

In response, Congress passed the Military Commissions Act of 2006, at the request of the Bush administration, to provide the authority for the executive branch to create and operate the commissions and to respond to concerns of the Supreme Court. President George W. Bush signed it on October 17, 2006.

Hamdan's trial was scheduled to begin in June 2007.

== Charged under the Military Commissions Act ==
After having been detained for five years at the Guantanamo camp, Hamdan was charged under the new act on May 10, 2007, with conspiracy and "providing support for terrorism."

According to the Houston Chronicle, Lieutenant Commander Charles Swift, Hamdan's lawyer, argued that conspiracy charges were inappropriate for such junior people as Hamdan. Commander Jeffrey Gordon, a DoD spokesman, disputed the assertion that Hamdan was a "low-level player."

== Charges dismissed ==
In two separate military rulings, on June 4, 2007, the court dropped all charges against Hamdan and Omar Khadr, a Canadian citizen. Army Judge Colonel Peter Brownback and US Navy Judge Captain Keith J. Allred ruled that the men's Combatant Status Review Tribunals had simply confirmed the men's status as enemy combatants. While the Military Commissions Act authorized the Guantanamo Military Commissions the authority to try "unlawful enemy combatants", the judges asserted that the commissions lacked the jurisdiction to try the men as "enemy combatants".

This meant that all the detainees' cases would have to be reviewed to determine if each was an "unlawful enemy combatant", as only then could a detainee be tried under the MCA. James Westhead of the BBC said that the court ruling, which affects all 380 Guantanamo detainees, represented a "stunning blow" against the Bush administration's efforts to bring the detainees to trial.

According to the BBC, following the rulings, the US government appeared to have three legal options:

- Scrap the legal process and start again.
- Redefine the inmates as "unlawful" enemy combatants at separate hearings.
- Appeal the court ruling. No appeals court to review "military commission" decisions has yet been set up. (Later the Court of Military Commission Review was established for this purpose.)

The Washington Post reported that the ruling made it likely that passage would be achieved for a Senate bill restoring access to the US Court system to the Guantanamo captives. The Washington Post speculated that the ruling might force whatever trials take place to be administered in the existing systems of the civilian courts or the military courts under the courts martial system.

== Deemed an "illegal enemy combatant" ==
On December 21, 2007, Judge Allred heard arguments, and ruled that Hamdan was an "illegal enemy combatant", who could thus be tried by a military commission. Lieutenant Brian Mizer, one of Hamdan's lawyers, said his team had introduced evidence:

... to suggest that, if the weapons at issue were in the car he was driving at the time he was apprehended, Mr. Hamdan was doing nothing more than transporting conventional weapons of war in the direction of a conventional battleground in support of a known enemy combatant engaged in an international armed conflict.

== February 8, 2008 hearing ==
A hearing was convened on February 8, 2008.

=== Mental stability ===
Hamdan's lawyers filed a request with Allred requesting the detainee be moved out of solitary confinement. They argued that prolonged solitary confinement was having such a negative effect on his mental stability that it was impairing his ability to assist in his own defense. The attorney Andrea Prasow wrote:

I do not believe that Mr. Hamdan will be able to materially assist in his own defense if his conditions do not improve.

His attorneys said he had been allowed only two exercise periods in the previous month.

Hamdan had been housed in camp 4, the camp for the most compliant captives until December 2006. Captives in camp 4 wear white uniforms, sleep in communal dormitories and can use an exercise yard and mingle with other captives for up to 20 hours a day. After that date, he was moved to camp 5, where captives spend almost the entire day in isolation in a windowless cell.

Emily Keram, a psychiatrist, examined Hamdan and, according to the Seattle Post Intelligencer:

... said he shows signs of post-traumatic stress disorder and could be at risk for "suicidal thoughts and behavior."

Hamdan's lawyers compared the treatment accorded to the Canadian citizen, Omar Khadr, with that accorded to Hamdan. They requested Allred to hear Khadr to explain why he was housed in Camp Four. They pointed out that Khadr had been allowed a phone call to his family. According to the International Herald Tribune, Hamdan's lawyers said

he is suicidal, hears voices, has flashbacks, talks to himself and says the restrictions of Guantánamo "boil his mind."

=== Missing records ===
Hamdan's Defense expressed a concern that the Prosecution had been withholding some of the detainee's records from them. Lieutenant Commander Timothy Stone told Allred that they had turned over copies of records, except for those from 2002—which they had been unable to locate. He assured Allred they were still looking for them. Chief Prosecutor Colonel Lawrence Morris suggested that the missing files contained "generally innocuous stuff".

=== Access to the high-value detainees ===
In February 2008, Hamdan's lawyers requested access to Khalid Sheikh Mohammed and the thirteen other high value detainees in order to gather more information for their defense, which Morris opposed. Allred postponed ruling on Hamdan's lawyer's request.

== Boycott ==
On April 29, after seven years of cooperation, Hamdan announced he was joining the ongoing detainee boycott of Guantanamo Military Commissions, saying:

America tells the whole world that it has freedom and justice. I do not see that ... There are almost 100 detainees here. We do not see any rights. You do not give us the least bit of humanity ... Give me a just court ... Try me with a just law.

== July trial ==
Hamdan's trial began on July 21, 2008.

=== Jury selection ===
Thirteen candidates for the military commission jury went through voir dire. Six jury members, and an alternate, were selected on July 21, 2008. Reuters reported that the jurors identities were being kept secret. An officer who knew the captain of the USS Cole, which was bombed by terrorists, was turned down. Reuters reported he was a former police officer.

=== Not guilty plea ===
Hamdan pleaded not guilty to all charges.

=== Court proscribed evidence from testimony produced under coercion ===
According to USA Today Hamdan's Presiding Officer, Keith Allred, ruled that prosecutors could not use confessions Hamdan made when in American custody in Bagram Theater Internment Facility and a detention facility in Panjshir. At the time, he was subjected to what were described by the administration as enhanced interrogation techniques, more generally held to be torture.

Carol Rosenberg, writing in the Miami Herald, reported that on July 28, 2008, prosecution witnesses "allege his crimes cover the era of the embassies car bombings and a suicide attack by an explosives-laden boat on the USS Cole in 2000, even though he neither plotted nor knew about the terror attacks beforehand."

On July 24, 2008, Michael St. Ours, a Naval Criminal Investigative Service (NCIS) agent, testified that Abdellah Tabarak had been in charge of Osama bin Laden's security detail. According to Rosenberg of the Miami Herald, St. Ours "looked stunned" when Hamdan's defense counsel said that Tabarak had been released without charge. Andrew Cohen, a legal affairs commentator for CBS News, called the testimony that Tabarak had been released a "colossal embarrassment" to the government.

Hamdan's prosecution did not provide documents from the detainee's interrogations until July 28, 2008. One confirmed Hamdan's account that female interrogators had subjected him to sexual humiliation during earlier interrogation. Harry H. Schneider Jr., said that after reading this document, he found Hamdan's account of sexual humiliation was "right on the money". The prosecutor John Murphy disputed that what the interrogation document described should be described as coercion. He said: "It casts a sort of black cloud over the agents and those who work with detainees, and what's been put forth doesn't show it."

=== Robert McFadden's testimony ===
The defense tried to block the admission of testimony by Robert McFadden, a former FBI agent who had interrogated Hamdan. The Presiding Officer had already ruled that the testimony of most of Hamdan's first interrogators at Guantanamo was inadmissible, due to their use of coercive techniques. On July 29, 2008, the Presiding Officer ruled that he was going to penalize the Prosecution for failing to release documents to the Defense by disallowing McFadden's testimony from May 2003. The key testimony expected from McFadden was his having heard Hamdan confirm that he had sworn "Bay'ah", a kind of oath of fealty, to Osama bin Laden. However, Judge Allred decided to allow McFadden's testimony.

== Conviction and acquittal ==
The jury acquitted Salim Ahmed Hamdan of conspiracy and convicted him of material support for terrorism. While he was waiting for the decision, he was allowed his first call to his family in Yemen. It was the 107th call made by a detainee.

== Sentencing ==
On August 7, 2008, Hamdan was sentenced by the military jury to five and a half years (66 months) imprisonment. Prosecutors had urged a sentence of 30 years-to-life, while Hamdan's defense had recommended less than 45 months. At the time he was already credited for having served 61 months, so the sentence imposed five months additional imprisonment. A Pentagon spokesman noted that Hamdan's status could revert to "enemy combatant" after his sentence was served, and as such he could be indefinitely detained.

Allred, the Presiding Officer of his Commission, called Hamdan a "small player," and said this sentence meant Hamdan would be eligible to having his continued detention reviewed by an Administrative Review Board (a form of appeals court) when his sentence was completed. He told Hamdan:

I hope the day comes that you return to your wife and daughters and your country, and you're able to be a provider, a father and a husband in the best sense of all those terms.

== Reactions ==
Former Chief Prosecutor, Air Force Colonel Morris Davis commented:

- "The decision showed what the jury thought Hamdan was worth."
- "There is a perception that trying people in front of the military was going to be a rubber-stamp process. This shows they are conscientious, following instructions and are making rational decisions."

According to the Associated Press, former Deputy Assistant Secretary of Defense for Detainee Affairs Charles "Cully" Stimson wrote an e-mail regarding the sentence:

The lesson I hope the government learns from this case, among other things, is ... don't bring skimpy or weak charges of conspiracy.

The American Civil Liberties Union's spokesman Ben Wizner, said:

If the government heard the jury's message, it will not use a flawed war court to prosecute conduct that does not violate the laws of war.

On August 10, 2008, Josh White, writing in The Washington Post, reported that in late 2006, the Hamdan prosecution and defense had discussed a plea deal. He reported that Charles "Cully" Stimson, then the Deputy Assistant Secretary of Defense for Detainee Affairs, had agreed to make a case for a negotiated sentence of ten years. According to White, Stimson said more senior Bush officials "were stubborn" and "rejected the notion of a 'mere 10 years.'"

On August 11, 2008, Jess Bravin of The Wall Street Journal reported on interviews with one of Hamdan's jurors. The juror said the verdict was not intended to be a rebuke to the Bush administration, rather, "...it came down to the evidence that we were allowed to see."

== Request for new sentencing hearing ==
On September 26, 2008, Army Colonel Lawrence Morris, Guantanamo's Chief Prosecutor, asked for a new sentencing hearing for Hamdan. He asked that Hamdan not be granted credit for time served, and serve an additional six years. The Department of Defense continued to say that it could continue to hold enemy combatant captives as detainees after they served their sentences assigned by the Military Commissions.

Hamdan's military lawyer, Lt. Cmdr. Brian Mizer said:

The government, having stacked the deck, is now complaining about the hand it was dealt.

On October 31, 2008, Judge Allred ruled that Hamdan's sentence would not be reconsidered.

== Return to Yemen ==
In November 2008, the United States transferred Hamdan to Yemen, where the government had agreed to keep him in custody until he served the remaining month of his sentence. His family were not allowed to meet him at Sanaa International Airport.

Chuck Schmitz, one of Hamdan's translators in Guantanamo, has been asked by a publisher about co-writing a book with Hamdan about his experiences.

== Appeal and dismissal of charges ==
Hamdan continued to appeal his conviction after his release. It was upheld in 2011 by the Court of Military Commission Review and appealed to the United States Court of Appeals for the District of Columbia Circuit. On October 17, 2012, that Court vacated Hamdan's conviction, on the grounds that the acts he was charged with under the Military Commissions Act of 2006 were not war crimes by international law at the time he committed them. This meant that his prosecution was ex post facto and unconstitutional. Decided by a three-judge panel, the decision was written by Judge Brett Kavanaugh, with judges David Sentelle and Douglas Ginsburg largely concurring.

== See also ==
- The Oath (2010 film)
