= Detainee Treatment Act =

2005 US Congress Act concerning the treatment of Guantanamo Bay detainees

The Detainee Treatment Act of 2005 (DTA) is an Act of the United States Congress that was signed into law by President George W. Bush on December 30, 2005 as part of Public Law 109-148. Offered as an amendment to a supplemental defense spending bill, it contains provisions relating to treatment of persons in custody of the Department of Defense, and administration of detainees held in Guantanamo Bay, Cuba, including:

- Prohibiting "cruel, inhuman, or degrading treatment or punishment" of any prisoner of the U.S. government, including prisoners at Guantanamo Bay.
- Requiring military interrogations to be performed according to the U.S. Army Field Manual for Human Intelligence Collector Operations.
- Directing the Department of Defense to establish Combatant Status Review Tribunals (CSRTs) for persons held in Guantanamo Bay.
- Giving the Washington, D.C. Circuit Court of Appeals authority to review decisions of CSRTs.
- Requiring that habeas corpus appeals for aliens detained at Guantanamo be per the DTA, though offering no specific provisions for it.
- Giving immunity to government agents and military personnel from civil and criminal action for using interrogation techniques that "were officially authorized and determined to be lawful at the time they were conducted."

Many voices were crucial in pushing for the bill's passage. In particular, former federal judge and legal advisor to Secretary of State George Shultz, Abraham Sofaer, sent a persuasive letter to Senator Patrick Leahy. In it, he expressed his belief that the application of Article 16 should be applied outside of the U.S. as well.

Abraham D. Sofaer wrote that, “We agreed in the Torture Convention that all humans should be protected against official acts amounting to torture, or ‘‘other acts’’ covered by Article 16, and we undertook to ‘‘take effective legislative, administrative, judicial or other measures to prevent acts of torture’’ and the other acts covered by Article 16, when they occur ‘‘in any territory’’ under US jurisdiction. Article 2 of the Treaty requires us to take measures against acts of torture in territory under our jurisdiction, and we understand this to mean any territory, not just the territory of the US to which the Eighth Amendment is applicable. Since the underlying objective is the same everywhere--to prevent official acts of torture, cruelty, or other abuse covered by the meanings of the words involved which are within our legal capacity to prevent—no good reason can be given to conclude that the geographic scope of the words in Article 16 should be narrower than the geographic scope of the same words in Article 2.”

== Legislative details ==
The amendment affected the United States Senate Department of Defense Appropriations Act, 2006 (DOD Act); the amendment is commonly referred to as the Amendment on (1) the Army Field Manual and (2) Cruel, Inhumane, Degrading Treatment, amendment #1977 and also known as the McCain Amendment 1977. It became the Detainee Treatment Act of 2005 (DTA) as Division A, Title X of the DOD Act. The amendment prohibits inhumane treatment of prisoners, including prisoners at Guantanamo Bay, by confining interrogations to the techniques in FM 34-52 Intelligence Interrogation. Also, section 1005(e) of the DTA prohibits aliens detained in Guantanamo Bay from applying for a writ of habeas corpus. Certain portions of the amendment were enacted as 42 U.S.C. § 2000dd.

Amendment 1977 amended the Defense Appropriations Bill for 2005 (H.R.2863) passed by the United States House of Representatives. The amendment was introduced to the Senate by Senator John McCain (R-Arizona) on October 3, 2005, as S.Amdt.1977.

The amendment was co-sponsored by a bi-partisan group of senators, including Lindsey Graham, Chuck Hagel, Gordon H. Smith, Susan M. Collins, Lamar Alexander, Dick Durbin, Carl Levin, John Warner, Lincoln Chafee, John E. Sununu, and Ken Salazar.

On October 5, 2005, the United States Senate voted 90–9 to support the amendment.

The Senators who voted against the amendment were Wayne Allard (R-CO), Kit Bond (R-MO), Tom Coburn (R-OK), Thad Cochran (R-MS), John Cornyn (R-TX), James Inhofe (R-OK), Pat Roberts (R-KS), Jeff Sessions (R-AL), and Ted Stevens (R-AK).

== Signing statement by President Bush ==
President Bush signed the bill into law on December 30, 2005. In his signing statement, Bush said:

The executive branch shall construe Title X in Division A of the Act, relating to detainees, in a manner consistent with the constitutional authority of the President to supervise the unitary executive branch and as Commander in Chief and consistent with the constitutional limitations on the judicial power, which will assist in achieving the shared objective of the Congress and the President, evidenced in Title X, of protecting the American people from further terrorist attacks.

The Boston Globe quoted an anonymous senior administration official saying,

Of course the president has the obligation to follow this law, (but) he also has the obligation to defend and protect the country as the commander in chief, and he will have to square those two responsibilities in each case. We are not expecting that those two responsibilities will come into conflict, but it's possible that they will.

== Criticism ==
The Act sets the Army's standards of interrogation as the standard for all agencies in the Department of Defense. It prohibits all other agencies of the U.S. government, such as the CIA and the FBI from subjecting any person in their custody to "cruel, inhuman, or degrading treatment or punishment". However, the Act does not provide detailed guidelines that spell out the meaning of that phrase. In an effort to provide clarification, Congress passed legislation in 2008 to similarly constrain the intelligence community to the Field Manual's techniques. McCain voted against this bill and recommended that President Bush follow through on his threat to veto it, arguing that the CIA already could not engage in torture but should have more options than afforded to military interrogators. That bill was passed by both chambers of Congress but, once vetoed, failed to pass with sufficient votes to override the executive veto.

The Detainee Treatment Act cited the U.S. Army's Field Manual on interrogation as the authoritative guide to interrogation techniques, but did not cite a specific edition of the Manual. The contents of the Manual are controlled by the Department of Defense, and thus the executive branch controls whether a given technique will be permitted or banned. The Manual has been revised since the Amendment became law. The Department of Defense has claimed that none of the techniques permitted by the new Field Manual 2-22.3 is classified.

Also, the Detainee Treatment Act's anti-torture provisions were modified by the Graham-Levin Amendment, which was attached to the $453 billion 2006 Defense Budget Bill. The Graham-Levin Amendment permits the Department of Defense to consider evidence obtained through torture of Guantanamo Bay detainees, and expands the prohibition of habeas corpus for re-detainees, which subsequently leaves detainees no legal recourse if they are tortured.

Critics say these two actions deflate the Detainee Treatment Act from having any real power in stopping torture by the United States government, and these were the reasons why President Bush and McCain "conceded" to congressional demands. The media credited their concession to "overwhelming congressional support" for the measure. Amnesty International claims that the amendment's loopholes signal that torture is now official US policy.

The Republican senators Lindsey Graham and Jon Kyl have been criticized for their amicus curiae brief filed in the Hamdan v. Rumsfeld (2006) case, in which they argued that the Detainee Treatment Act's passage sufficed to deny the Supreme Court jurisdiction over the case. Language in the Congressional Record, which is cited in the majority opinion, was inserted by Graham and Kyl into the Record for the day on which the amendment passed after the legislation had already been enacted. The language in question was worded in such a manner as to imply it had been recorded in live debate. The revised Record contains such phrasing as Kyl's "Mr. President, I see that we are nearing the end of our allotted time" and Sen. Sam Brownback's "If I might interrupt". Brownback has not responded to press inquiries. Justice Scalia's dissent noted this incident as an example on which he has based his longstanding hostility to the use of legislative history in court decisions.

Scalia wrote:

Worst of all is the Court’s reliance on the legislative history of the DTA to buttress its implausible reading ... These statements were made when Members of Congress were fully aware that our continuing jurisdiction over this very case was at issue. ... The question was divisive, and floor statements made on both sides were undoubtedly opportunistic and crafted solely for use in the briefs in this very litigation. ... [T]he handful of floor statements that the Court treats as authoritative do not "reflec[t] any general agreement"[,] [t]hey reflect the now-common tactic – which the Court once again rewards – of pursuing through floor-speech ipse dixit what could not be achieved through the constitutionally prescribed method of putting language into a bill that a majority of both Houses vote for and the President signs.

— (Emphases in original)

== See also ==
- United Nations Convention Against Torture
- Ethical arguments regarding torture
- Ticking time bomb scenario
- Unlawful combatant
- Military Commissions Act of 2006
- Hamdan v. Rumsfeld
- Guantanamo detainees' appeals in Washington, D.C., courts
- Military Commissions Act of 2009
- Enemy Belligerent Interrogation, Detention, and Prosecution Act of 2010
