= Presiding Officer (Guantanamo military commissions) =

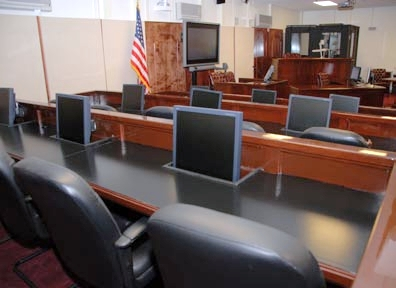
Hearing room where low-security Guantanamo captives military commission hearings are held. Separate hearing rooms for high-security hearings isolate the press in a sound-proof booth, where the closed-circuit audio can be killed by a mute switch when secrets are uttered.

The United States of America has charged Guantanamo captives before "military commissions", each presided over by a presiding officer.

The presiding officers were initially to serve as the first among equals on bodies where the commission members served the roles similar to both judge and jury.

In the first version of the military commissions the presiding officer was to be the only member of the commission who was a lawyer. Thus, the presiding officer would be making all the ruling similar to the rulings on points of law that a judge makes in courts of law. However, the presiding officer would also be voting on the suspect's guilt or innocence—unlike in a jury trial.

The commission system was extensively reformed in the summer of 2004. Several of the original commission members of the first commission were retired, because of their inherent bias. The structure of the commissions was changed, so that the presiding officer would no long vote on the suspect's guilt. In the summer of 2005 leaked memos were published that revealed that prior to the reorganization the first chief prosecutor, Fred Borch, promised his subordinates that only officers who could be counted on to convict suspects would be chosen as commission members, and that prosecutors would not have to worry about exculpatory evidence—as it would all be classified so it could be withheld from the suspect's attorneys on national security grounds.

Peter Brownback—the first presiding officer—was unexpectedly replaced in the summer of 2008. Critics speculated that he had been fired because he kept trying to force Omar Khadr's prosecution to release evidence to Khadr's defense attorneys.

== List of presiding officers and suspects ==
Guantanamo military commission presiding officers
Rank	Officer	Service	Case(s)	Notes
Colonel	Peter Brownback	United States Army		
Captain	Keith J. Allred	United States Navy		
Colonel	W. Thomas Cumbie	United States Air Force		
Colonel	Ronald A. Gregory	United States Air Force		
Colonel	Ralph H. Kohlmann	United States Marine Corps		
Lieutenant Colonel	Nancy J. Paul	United States Marine Corps		
Colonel	James L. Pohl	United States Army		
Colonel	Robert Chester	United States Marine Corps		
Colonel	Steven David	United States Army Reserve		
Colonel	Patrick Parrish	United States Army		
Captain	Moira Modzelewski	United States Navy		
Lieutenant Colonel	Raymond Eugene Beal II	United States Marine Corps		
Colonel	Stephen R. Henley	United States Army		
Captain	Bruce W. Mackenzie	United States Navy		
