= Guantanamo military commission =

U.S. military tribunals

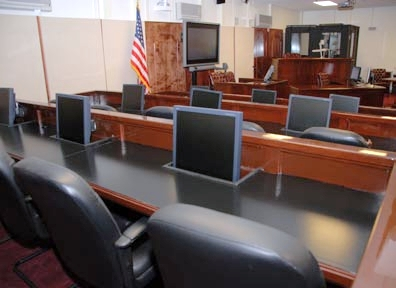
Court room where initial Guantanamo military commissions convened.

The Guantanamo military commissions were originally established by President George W. Bush through a military order on November 13, 2001, to try certain non-citizen terrorism suspects at the Guantanamo Bay prison. In 2006, the Supreme Court found that the military commissions, as they operated, were unconstitutional, and Congress responded by passing the Military Commissions Act of 2006. Military commissions are currently governed by the Military Commissions Act of 2009.

Thirty-two Guantanamo Bay detainees were charged between 2004 and 2026. To date, there have been a total of eight convictions in the military commissions, six through plea agreements. Several of the eight convictions have been overturned in whole or in part on appeal by U.S. federal courts. There are five cases currently ongoing in the commissions and another two pending appeal, including United States v. Khalid Sheikh Mohammed, et al.—the prosecution of the detainees alleged to be most responsible for the September 11 attacks. None of those five cases has yet gone to trial.

== History ==
As explained by the Congressional Research Service, the United States first used military commissions to try enemy belligerents accused of war crimes during the occupation in Mexico in 1847, made use of them in the Civil War and in the Philippine Insurrection, and then again in the aftermath of World War II. In Ex parte Quirin, 317 U.S. 1 (1942), the United States Supreme Court upheld the jurisdiction of a military tribunal over eight German saboteurs captured in the United States during World War II. Quirin has been cited as a precedent for the trial by military commission of unlawful combatants. For the next fifty years, however, the U.S. relied on its established federal court and military justice systems to prosecute alleged war crimes and terrorism offenses.

On November 13, 2001, President Bush issued a military order governing the "Detention, Treatment, and Trial of Certain Non-Citizens in the War Against Terrorism". The order effectively established the military commissions at Guantanamo Bay, which began in February 2004 with charges against four Guantanamo detainees, although the infrastructure for the commissions was established in March 2002 and early-to-mid 2003 with the issuance of numerous Military Commission Orders and Military Commission Instructions.

In 2006, the US Supreme Court struck down the military commissions (in Hamdan v. Rumsfeld), determining that the commissions violated both the Uniform Code of Military Justice and the 1949 Geneva Conventions. In response, and in order to permit the commissions to go forward, Congress passed the Military Commissions Act of 2006 (MCA). Congress significantly amended the MCA in 2009. In 2019, exercising authority granted to him under the MCA, the Secretary of Defense published an updated Manual for Military Commissions, which sets forth the current procedures that govern the commissions.

== Costs ==
According to the United States Government Accountability Office (GAO), from fiscal years 2012 to 2018 the Department of Defense spent $679.6 million on the military commissions. Defense Department officials told GAO that the department plans to spend almost $1 billion more from fiscal year 2019 through at least fiscal year 2023.

== Commission cases and status ==
Of the 779 men detained at Guantanamo at some point since the prison opened on January 11, 2002, only 32 have been charged by military commissions. Charges were dismissed in 12 of those cases, and stayed in another. The U.S. government has procured eight convictions total, six of which were achieved through plea agreements. U.S. federal courts have overturned several of the eight convictions in whole or in part.

There are five cases currently ongoing in the commissions—and another two pending appeal—including United States v. Khalid Sheikh Mohammed, et al.—the prosecution of the detainees alleged to be most responsible for the September 11, 2001, attacks. None of those five cases has yet gone to trial.

On July 9, 2021, Brig. Gen. Mark Martins – the chief prosecutor for the military commissions since March 2009 – announced his retirement. That same day, The New York Times reported that "General Martins submitted his retirement papers ... after repeatedly butting heads with Biden administration lawyers over positions his office had taken on the applicable international law and the Convention Against Torture at the Guantánamo court, according to senior government officials with knowledge of the disputes."

=== Active cases and pending appeals ===
| Accused | Allegations | Case status |
|---|---|---|
| Khalid Sheikh Mohammed Walid Bin 'Attash Ali Abdul Aziz Ali Mustafa al-Hawsawi Ramzi Binalshibh | Varying levels of direct and indirect involvement in planning, funding, and otherwise facilitating the September 11, 2001 attacks that killed 2,997 people. | Referred to the Capital Military Commission on April 4, 2012. The case remains in pre-trial hearings. Trial set to begin June 5, 2028. On August 28, 2026, the trial judge ruled that statements Khalid Sheikh Mohammed made to FBI interrogators at Guantanamo in 2007 were not given voluntarily and are inadmissible at trial. Prosecutors were given five days to decide whether to appeal. |
| Abd al Rahim al Nashiri | Alleged to have planned, organized, and directed the October 12, 2000, attack against the USS Cole while in port in Aden, Yemen, killing 17 sailors and injuring many more. Alleged to have planned, organized, and directed the October 6, 2002, attack against the French supertanker MV Limburg, killing one, injuring 12, and spilling 90,000 barrels of oil into Gulf. | Referred to a Capital Military Commission on September 28, 2011. Panel selection began November 2, 2026. |
| Abd al-Hadi al-Iraqi | Alleged to have been an organizer and senior leader of al Qaeda and liaison to the Taliban, and to have participated to varying degrees in attacks against U.S. forces. | Referred to non-capital Military Commission on June 2, 2014. The case remains in pretrial proceedings. |
| Encep Nurjaman, a/k/a "Hambali" Mohammed Nazir Bin Lep, a/k/a "Lillie" Mohamad Farik Amin, a/k/a "Zubair" | Alleged to have played various roles in the bombing of nightclubs in Bali, Indonesia in 2002 and the bombing of a J.W. Marriott hotel in Jakarta, Indonesia in 2003. | Charges referred (Zubon January 21, 2021. |
| Ali al-Bahlul | Alleged to have received military training in Afghanistan and to have acted as a "media secretary" for Osama bin Laden. | Referred on February 26, 2008. Convicted of all counts in 2008. Convictions for solicitation and material support for terrorism vacated and conviction for conspiracy sustained on plain error review by D.C. Circuit Court of Appeals in 2016. Petition for certoriari filed in the Supreme Court on August 24, 2021. |
| Omar Khadr Repatriated to Canada | At age 15, alleged to have thrown a grenade during a July 2002 U.S. military raid on a suspected al Qaeda compound in Afghanistan that killed a U.S. soldier. | Referred on April 24, 2007. Pled guilty to all counts in 2010. Sued the Canadian government for violating his constitutional rights, and obtained an apology and a multimillion-dollar settlement. On appeal in the Court of Military Commission Review. |
| Ibrahim al Qosi Repatriated to Sudan | Alleged to have served as a driver, logistician, and cook for Osama bin Laden and the residents of an al-Qaeda compound in Afghanistan. | Pled guilty to all counts in 2010. Petition for writ of mandamus in support of al Qosi's appeal rights filed on January 4, 2013. Appeal dismissed by D.C. Circuit on October 27, 2020. |

=== Closed, inactive, and dismissed cases ===
| Accused | Case status |
|---|---|
| Ahmed al Darbi repatriated | Pled guilty. Findings and sentence approved by the Convening Authority Transferred to Saudi Arabia per a pretrial agreement. |
| Majid Khan repatriated | Pled guilty. Transferred to Belize after serving his sentence. |
| Mohammed Hashim repatriated | Charges dismissed at direction of Convening Authority on May 20, 2009. Transferred to Afghanistan. |
| Ahmed Khalfan Ghailani serving sentence in federal prison | Charges dismissed at direction of Convening Authority on May 29, 2009. Prosecution transferred to federal court (Southern District of New York). Convicted of one count of conspiracy and sentenced to life imprisonment in federal prison. |
| Salim Hamdan repatriated | Convicted of Material Support for Terrorism. Transferred to Yemen after serving his sentence. Conviction vacated by Hamdan v. United States (D.C. Cir. 2012). |
| David Hicks repatriated | Pled guilty to all counts. Transferred to Australia after serving his sentence. Conviction vacated by the Court of Military commission Review pursuant to Al Bahlul v. United States (D.C. Cir. 2014). |
| Noor Muhammed repatriated | Pled guilty to all counts. Transferred to Sudan after serving his sentence. Charges subsequently dismissed by Convening Authority in light of Hamdan v. United States (D.C. Cir. 2012) and Al Bahlul v. United States (D.C. Cir. 2014). |
| Mohammed Jawad repatriated | Transferred to Afghanistan after federal court granted his petition for habeas corpus during pretrial proceedings. |
| Fouad al Rabia repatriated | Transferred to Kuwait after federal court granted his petition for habeas corpus prior to trial. |
| Binyam Mohammed repatriated | Transferred to England after charges dismissed by Convening Authority. |
| Obaidullah repatriated | Charges dismissed at direction of Convening Authority on June 7, 2011. Transferred to Afghanistan. |
| Mohammed Kamin repatriated | Charges dismissed at direction of Convening Authority on December 3, 2009. Transferred to Afghanistan. |
| Tarek El Sawah repatriated | Charges dismissed at direction of Convening Authority on March 1, 2012. Transferred to Bosnia and Herzegovina. |
| Faiz al Kandari repatriated | Charges dismissed at direction of Convening Authority June 29, 2012. Transferred to Kuwait. |
| Ghassan al Sharbi | Charges dismissed at direction of Convening Authority on January 18, 2013. |
| Jabran al Qahtani repatriated | Charges dismissed at direction of Convening Authority on January 28, 2013. Transferred to Saudi Arabia. |
| Sufyian Barhoumi | Charges dismissed at direction of Convening Authority on January 28, 2013. |
| Abdul Ghani repatriated | Charges dismissed at direction of Convening Authority on December 19, 2008. Transferred to Afghanistan. |
| Abdul Zahir resettled | Charges stayed indefinitely by the Appointing Authority on June 10, 2006. Transferred to Oman. |

== Public access limitations ==
The Department of Defense currently facilitates public access to the military commissions, and to information about military commission proceedings, in the following ways:

- communicating directly with victims and their family members about hearings;
- enabling selected members of the public to view proceedings in-person;
- providing five sites in the United States to view proceedings remotely via closed circuit television (CCTV);
- making information such as court documents available on the Office of Military Commissions' website.

In practice, there are significant limitations associated with most of these access methods. Through the Fiscal Year 2018 National Defense Authorization Act, Congress required the Government Accountability Office (GAO) to study the feasibility and advisability of expanding access to military commissions proceeding that are open to the public. GAO published its report in February, 2019. Its findings included:

=== In-person viewing ===
Travel to Guantanamo is onerous, and logistics once there are difficult. The military commissions courtroom gallery limits attendance to 52 seats. Moreover, GAO notes that "while selected victims and family members and non-government stakeholders are able to view proceedings in-person [at Guantanamo] the vast majority of the general public cannot, due to DOD policy."

=== Remote viewing ===
GAO noted that "victims and their family members are located throughout the world or are concentrated in areas of the United States that are a significant distance from one of these five locations." Moreover, some victims and family members reported that they or their relatives have been denied access to certain of the sites because, "according to DOD, they did not meet the department's definition of a victim or family member."

=== Timeliness of publishing documents ===
By regulation, the Defense Department is supposed to post court documents on the Office of Military Commissions website generally no later than 15 business days after they have been filed in court. However, GAO found that "DOD has generally not met this standard for the timely posting of documents, which substantially limits public access to information about proceedings." A sampling of over 11,000 filings from a six-month period in 2018 showed that, save for unofficial court transcripts from open hearing, filings were not posted until "almost four months to more than five months past DOD's timeliness standard."

=== Secrecy ===
Defense Department officials told GAO that "unlike most—if not all—federal criminal trials or courts-martial, commissions' court documents and proceedings regularly involve an unprecedented amount of classified information that cannot be shared with the public. For example, DOD officials told us that a substantial amount of evidence used in the commissions' proceedings relates to partially-classified activities conducted by intelligence agencies outside the department—such as the Central Intelligence Agency's former Rendition, Detention, and Interrogation Program."

Consistent with GAO's findings, on August 4, 2021, 75 Members of Congress wrote to President Biden urging greater transparency in the military commissions process.

== Comparisons to U.S. and international systems ==
=== United States justice systems ===
The United States has two parallel justice systems, with laws, statutes, precedents, rules of evidence, and paths for appeal. Under these justice systems, prisoners have certain rights. They have a right to know the evidence against them; they have a right to protect themselves against self-incrimination; they have a right to counsel; and they have a right to have the witnesses against them cross-examined.

The two parallel justice systems are the Judicial Branch of the U.S. Government, and a slightly streamlined justice system named the Uniform Code of Military Justice (UCMJ) for people under military jurisdiction. People undergoing a military court martial are entitled to the same basic rights as those in the civilian justice system.

The Guantanamo military trials under the 2006 MCA do not operate according to either system of justice. The differences include:

- Unlike civilian courts, only two-thirds of the jury needs to agree in order to convict someone under the military commission rules. This includes charges such as supporting terrorism, attempted murder, and murder.
- The accused are not allowed access to all the evidence against them. The Presiding Officers are authorized to consider secret evidence which the accused have no opportunity to see or refute.
- It may be possible for the commission to consider evidence that was extracted through coercive interrogation techniques before passage of the Detainee Treatment Act. Legally, the commission is restricted from considering any evidence extracted by torture, as defined by the Department of Defense in 2006.
- The proceedings may be closed at the discretion of the Presiding Officer, so that secret information may be discussed by the commission.
- The accused are not permitted a free choice of attorneys, as they can use only military lawyers or those civilian attorneys eligible for the Secret security clearance.
- Because the accused are charged as unlawful combatants (a certain category of people who are not classified as prisoners of war under the Geneva Conventions), then Secretary of Defense Donald Rumsfeld said in March 2002 that an acquittal on all charges by the commission is no guarantee of a release.

=== International ===
International human rights law prohibits trying non-military personnel in military tribunals. The United States has also never ratified the International Criminal Court statute, and withdrew its original signature of accession when it feared repercussions of the Iraq War.

Much like the military commissions, the International Criminal Court (ICC) trial procedures call for:

- A majority of the three judges present, as triers of fact, may reach a decision, which must include a full and reasoned statement. However, and unlike the U.S. Military Commission, those are judges rather than military officers. Additionally, the ICC statute requires the judges to be of a high level of competence in criminal law and the necessary relevant experience; or have established competence in relevant areas of international law such as international humanitarian law and the law of human rights and extensive experience in a professional legal capacity which is of relevance to the judicial work of the Court.
- Trials are supposed to be public, but proceedings are often closed, and such exceptions to a public trial have not been enumerated in detail. Nonetheless, the ICC statute explicitly states that the principle is a public trial, and exceptions could be entertained by the judges if they provide sufficient grounding.
- In camera proceedings are allowed for protection of witnesses or defendants as well as for confidential or sensitive evidence. However, the statute states that this is an exception to the principle of public hearings which the court applies in particular to victims of sexual violence and children who are victims or witnesses.
- Hearsay and other indirect evidence is not explicitly prohibited in the statute, which adds flexibility to the proceedings due to the different legal traditions of the judges or of the applied law. But it has been argued the court is guided by hearsay exceptions which are prominent in common law systems, similar to the military commissions. Nonetheless, established rules of international law provides that admissibility of such evidence by guided by "hearsay exceptions generally recognized by some national legal systems, as well as the truthfulness, voluntariness and trustworthiness of the evidence."

== Criticisms ==
Many observers and stakeholders have expressed the view that the military commissions have failed. These observers and stakeholders include former senior U.S. government officials and military officers; families of victims of the 9/11 attacks; former military commission prosecutors; federal prosecutors; prosecutors from the Nuremberg trials following World War II; academics; Members of Congress; human rights organizations; and others. There has been outrage directed at the United States' usage of military commissions to try Guantanamo Bay detainees by the international community. Criticisms include that the militaries control of the trials has led to unfair results and procedures. The military tribunals secrecy, lack of habeas corpus, and overarching military control has led to criticisms against the US's usage of them.

In an amicus brief filed with the U.S. Supreme Court on August 20, 2021, September 11 Families for Peaceful Tomorrows – an organization of more than 250 family members of those killed in the attacks of September 11, 2001 – wrote the following:

"Through their collective experience, the pursuit of justice has appeared increasingly quixotic to the members of Peaceful Tomorrows, and they have lost confidence in the fairness and integrity of the Proceedings. As the twentieth anniversary of the September 11th attacks approaches, the members of Peaceful Tomorrows fear that the 9/11 Proceedings will never offer the justice they seek – namely, a fair trial that applies the rule of law to both sides and brings the defendants to justice. They also fear that the subjugation of the defendants' rights will result in a broader erosion of rights and undermine the historical legitimacy of the 9/11 Proceedings themselves."

== See also ==
- List of resignations from the Guantanamo military commission
- Boycott of Guantanamo Military Commissions
- Combatant Status Review Tribunal
- Administrative Review Board
- United States v. Khalid Sheikh Mohammed
