= Military Commissions Act of 2006 =

Former United States law

- Long title: An Act to authorize trial by military commission for violations of the law of war, and for other purposes.

Citations
- Public law: 109-366
- Statutes at Large: 120 Stat. 2600

Codification
- Titles amended: 10
- U.S.C. sections created: 948-949

Legislative history
- Introduced in the Senate by Mitch McConnell (R–KY) on September 22, 2006; Passed the Senate on September 28, 2006 (65–34); Passed the House on September 29, 2006 (250–170); Signed into law by President George W. Bush on October 17, 2006

Major amendments
- Military Commissions Act of 2009

United States Supreme Court cases
- Boumediene v. Bush, 553 U.S. 723 (2008)

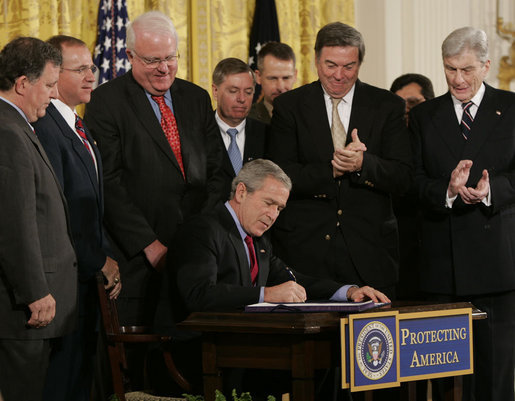
President George W. Bush signs into law S. 3930, the Military Commissions Act of 2006, during a ceremony on October 17, 2006 in the East Room of the White House.

The Military Commissions Act of 2006, also known as H. R. 6166, was an Act of Congress signed by President George W. Bush on October 17, 2006. The Act's stated purpose was "to authorize trial by military commission for violations of the law of war, and for other purposes".

It was drafted following the decision on Hamdan v. Rumsfeld (2006) from the Supreme Court of the United States, which ruled that the Combatant Status Review Tribunals (CSRT), as established by the United States Department of Defense, were procedurally flawed and unconstitutional, and did not provide protections under the Geneva Conventions. It prohibited detainees who had been classified as enemy combatants or were awaiting hearings on their status from using habeas corpus to petition federal courts in challenges to their detention. All pending habeas corpus cases at the federal district court were stayed.

In Boumediene v. Bush (2008), the Supreme Court held that Section 7 of the law was unconstitutional because of its restrictions of detainee rights under the Suspension Clause. It determined that detainees had the right to petition federal courts for challenges to the legal recourse of habeas corpus.

== Scope of the Act ==
Sec. 948b. Military commissions generally

(a) Purpose— This chapter establishes procedures governing the use of military commissions to try alien unlawful enemy combatants engaged in hostilities against the United States for violations of the law of war and other offenses triable by military commission.

(b) Authority for Military Commissions Under This Chapter— The President is authorized to establish military commissions under this chapter for offenses triable by military commission as provided in this chapter.

(c) Construction of Provisions— The procedures for military commissions set forth in this chapter are based upon the procedures for trial by general court-martial under chapter 47 of this title (the Uniform Code of Military Justice). Chapter 47 of this title does not, by its terms, apply to trial by military commission except as specifically provided in this chapter. The judicial construction and application of that chapter are not binding on military commissions established under this chapter.

(d) Inapplicability of Certain Provisions—

(1) The following provisions of this title shall not apply to trial by military commission under this chapter:

(A) Section 810 (article 10 of the Uniform Code of Military Justice), relating to speedy trial, including any rule of courts-martial relating to speedy trial.

(B) Sections 831(a), (b), and (d) (articles 31(a), (b), and (d) of the Uniform Code of Military Justice), relating to compulsory self-incrimination.

(C) Section 832 (article 32 of the Uniform Code of Military Justice), relating to pretrial investigation.

(2) Other provisions of chapter 47 of this title shall apply to trial by military commission under this chapter only to the extent provided by this chapter.

(e) Treatment of Rulings and Precedents— The findings, holdings, interpretations, and other precedents of military commissions under this chapter may not be introduced or considered in any hearing, trial, or other proceeding of a court-martial convened under chapter 47 of this title. The findings, holdings, interpretations, and other precedents of military commissions under this chapter may not form the basis of any holding, decision, or other determination of a court-martial convened under that chapter.

(f) Status of Commissions Under Common Article 3— A military commission established under this chapter is a regularly constituted court, affording all the necessary 'judicial guarantees which are recognized as indispensable by civilized peoples' for purposes of common Article 3 of the Geneva Conventions.

(g) Geneva Conventions Not Establishing Source of Rights— No alien unlawful enemy combatant subject to trial by military commission under this chapter may invoke the Geneva Conventions as a source of rights.

Sec. 948c. Persons subject to military commissions

Any alien unlawful enemy combatant is subject to trial by military commission under this chapter.

Sec. 948d. Jurisdiction of military commissions

(a) Jurisdiction— A military commission under this chapter shall have jurisdiction to try any offense made punishable by this chapter or the law of war when committed by an alien unlawful enemy combatant before, on, or after September 11, 2001.

(b) Lawful Enemy Combatants— Military commissions under this chapter shall not have jurisdiction over lawful enemy combatants. Lawful enemy combatants who violate the law of war are subject to chapter 47 of this title. Courts-martial established under that chapter shall have jurisdiction to try a lawful enemy combatant for any offense made punishable under this chapter.

(c) Determination of Unlawful Enemy Combatant Status Dispositive— A finding, whether before, on, or after the date of the enactment of the Military Commissions Act of 2006, by a Combatant Status Review Tribunal or another competent tribunal established under the authority of the President or the Secretary of Defense that a person is an unlawful enemy combatant is dispositive for purposes of jurisdiction for trial by military commission under this chapter.

(d) Punishments— A military commission under this chapter may, under such limitations as the Secretary of Defense may prescribe, adjudge any punishment not forbidden by this chapter, including the penalty of death when authorized under this chapter or the law of war.

The term "competent tribunal" is not defined in the Act itself. It is defined in the US Army Field Manual, section 27–10, for the purpose of determining whether a person is or is not entitled to prisoner of war status, and consists of a board of not less than three officers. It is also a term used in Article five of the third Geneva Convention. However, the rights guaranteed by the third Geneva Convention to lawful combatants are expressly denied to unlawful military combatants for the purposes of this Act by Section 948b (see above).

== Unlawful and lawful enemy combatant ==
"Any alien unlawful enemy combatant is subject to trial by military commission under chapter 47A — Military Commissions (of the Military Commissions Act of 2006 (10 U.S.C. 948a (Section 1, Subchapter I))). The definition of unlawful and lawful enemy combatant is given in Chapter 47A—Military commission: Subchapter I--General provisions: Sec. 948a. Definitions

The term 'unlawful enemy combatant' means —

(i) a person who has engaged in hostilities or who has purposefully and materially supported hostilities against the United States or its co-belligerents who is not a lawful enemy combatant (including a person who is part of the Taliban, al-Qaida, or associated forces); or
(ii) a person who, before, on, or after the date of the enactment of the Military Commissions Act of 2006, has been determined to be an unlawful enemy combatant by a Combatant Status Review Tribunal or another competent tribunal established under the authority of the President or the Secretary of Defense.

... The term 'lawful enemy combatant' means a person who is —

(A) a member of the regular forces of a State party engaged in hostilities against the United States;
(B) a member of a militia, volunteer corps, or organized resistance movement belonging to a State party engaged in such hostilities, which are under responsible command, wear a fixed distinctive sign recognizable at a distance, carry their arms openly, and abide by the law of war; or
(C) a member of a regular armed force who professes allegiance to a government engaged in such hostilities, but not recognized by the United States."

— Law No: 109-366 (summary)

The Act also defines an alien as "a person who is not a citizen of the United States", and a co-belligerent to mean "any State or armed force joining and directly engaged with the United States in hostilities or directly supporting hostilities against a common enemy."

== Provisions ==
The Act changes pre-existing law to forbid explicitly the invocation of the Geneva Conventions when executing the writ of habeas corpus or in other civil actions [Act sec. 5(a)]. This provision applies to all cases pending at the time the Act is enacted, as well as to all such future cases.

If the government chooses to bring a prosecution against the detainee, a military commission is convened for this purpose. The following rules are some of those established for trying alien unlawful enemy combatants.

(b) NOTICE TO ACCUSED—Upon the swearing of the charges

and specifications in accordance with subsection (a), the accused shall be informed of the charges against him as soon as practicable.

- A civilian defense attorney may not be used unless the attorney has been determined to be eligible for access to classified information that is classified at the level Secret or higher. [10 U.S.C. sec. 949c(b)(3)(D)]
- A finding of Guilty by a particular commission requires only a two-thirds majority of the members of the commission present at the time the vote is taken [10 U.S.C. sec. 949m(a)]
- In General— No person may invoke the Geneva Conventions or any protocols thereto in any habeas corpus or other civil action or proceeding to which the United States, or a current or former officer, employee, member of the Armed Forces, or other agent of the United States is a party as a source of rights in any court of the United States or its States or territories. [Act sec. 5(a)]
- As provided by the Constitution and by this section, the President has the authority for the United States to interpret the meaning and application of the Geneva Conventions and to promulgate higher standards and administrative regulations for violations of treaty obligations which are not grave breaches of the Geneva Conventions. [Act sec. 6(a)(3)(A)]
- No person may, without his consent, be tried by a military commission under this chapter a second time for the same offense. [10 U.S.C. sec. 949h(a)].

The Act also contains provisions (often referred to as the "habeas provisions") removing access to the courts for any alien detained by the United States government who is determined to be an enemy combatant, or who is 'awaiting determination' regarding enemy combatant status. This allows the United States government to detain such aliens indefinitely without prosecuting them in any manner.

These provisions are as follows:

(e)(1) No court, justice, or judge shall have jurisdiction to hear or consider an application for a writ of habeas corpus filed by or on behalf of an alien detained by the United States who has been determined by the United States to have been properly detained as an enemy combatant or is awaiting such determination. (2) Except as provided in paragraphs (2) and (3) of section 1005(e) of the Detainee Treatment Act of 2005 (10 U.S.C. 801 note), no court, justice, or judge shall have jurisdiction to hear or consider any other action against the United States or its agents relating to any aspect of the detention, transfer, treatment, trial, or conditions of confinement of an alien who is or was detained by the United States and has been determined by the United States to have been properly detained as an enemy combatant or is awaiting such determination.

Among other things, the MCA created the position of Chief Defense Counsel (United States).

== Boumediene v. Bush (2008) ==
In Boumediene v. Bush (2008), the US Supreme Court held that the MCA was unconstitutional as it restricted detainees' use of habeas corpus and access to the federal courts. It determined that detainees could have access to federal courts to hear habeas corpus petitions, to restore the protection of the Constitution.

=== Amendment in 2009 ===
The Military Commissions Act of 2009 amended some of the provisions of the 2006 Act to improve protections for defendants. The American Civil Liberties Union summarized the positive aspects as "restricting coerced and hearsay evidence and providing greater defense counsel resources." Overall, it argued that the law as amended still fell "short of providing the due process required by the Constitution."

== Applicability ==
There is a controversy over whether this law affects the rights of habeas corpus for United States citizens.

The text of the law states that its "purpose" is to "establish procedures governing the use of military commissions to try alien unlawful enemy combatants engaged in hostilities against the United States for violations of the law of war and other offenses triable by military commission." While the most controversial provisions in the law refer to "alien unlawful enemy combatants", section 948a refers to "unlawful enemy combatants" (not explicitly excluding US citizens).

Cato Institute legal scholar Robert A. Levy writes that the Act denies habeas rights only to aliens, and that US citizens detained as "unlawful combatants" would still have habeas rights with which to challenge their indefinite detention. While formally opposed to the Act, Human Rights Watch has also concluded that the new law limits the scope of trials by military commissions to non-US citizens including all legal aliens. CBS legal commentator Andrew Cohen, commenting on this question, writes that the "suspension of the writ of habeas corpus—the ability of an imprisoned person to challenge their confinement in court—applies only to resident aliens within the United States as well as other foreign nationals captured here and abroad" and that "it does not restrict the rights and freedoms and liberties of U.S. citizens anymore than they already have been restricted."

On the other hand, congressman David Wu (D–OR) stated in the debate over the bill on the floor of the House of Representatives that "by so restricting habeas corpus, this bill does not just apply to enemy aliens. It applies to all Americans because, while the provision on page 93 has the word "alien in it, the provision on page 61 does not have the word alien in it." For more on this interpretation, see criticism.

== Legislative history ==
The bill, S. 3930, passed the Senate, 65–34, on September 28, 2006.

The bill passed in the House, 250–170–12, on September 29, 2006.

Bush signed the bill into law on October 17, 2006.

=== Legislative actions in the Senate ===
Several amendments were proposed before final passage of the bill by the Senate; all were defeated. Among them were an amendment by Robert Byrd which would have added a sunset provision after five years, an amendment by Ted Kennedy directing the Secretary of State to notify other countries that the U.S. considered waterboarding and other enhanced interrogation techniques to be grave breaches of the Geneva Convention (SA.5088), and an amendment by Arlen Specter (R–PA) and Patrick Leahy (D–VT) preserving habeas corpus. The Kennedy amendment was defeated on separation of powers grounds although the Republican manager of the bill and chairman of the Armed Services Committee, Senator Warner (R-VA), noted that he agreed with Sen. Kennedy that the techniques were grave breaches of the Geneva Conventions and "clearly prohibited by the bill." Specter's amendment was rejected by a vote of 51–48. Specter voted for the bill despite the defeat of his amendment. The bill was finally passed by the House on September 29, 2006 and presented to the President for signing on October 10, 2006.

==== Final passage in the Senate ====
Party	AYE	NAY	ABS
Republicans	53	1	1
Democrats	12	32	0
Independent	0	1	0
Total	65	34	1

==== Final passage in the House ====
Party	AYE	NAY	ABS
Republicans	218	7	5
Democrats	32	162	7
Independent	0	1	0
Total	250	170	12

- AYE = Votes for the act
- NAY = Votes against the act
- ABS = Abstentions

== Support ==
Supporters of the act say that the Constitutional provision guaranteeing habeas corpus does not apply to alien enemy combatants engaged in hostilities against the United States, and that the provisions of the Act removing habeas corpus do not apply to United States citizens; they conclude that therefore the law does not conflict with the Constitution.

National Review columnist Andrew McCarthy argued that since the law applies to "aliens with no immigration status who are captured and held outside the territorial jurisdiction of the United States, and whose only connection to our country is to wage a barbaric war against it" they do not have a constitutional right to habeas corpus. McCarthy also wrote that the Detainee Treatment Act of 2005, while not allowing a standard habeas corpus review, provides that each detainee "has a right to appeal to our civilian-justice system. — specifically, to the U.S. Court of Appeals for the D.C. Circuit. And if that appeal is unsuccessful, the terrorist may also seek certiorari review by the Supreme Court."

John Yoo, a former Bush Administration Justice Department official and current professor of law at the University of California, Berkeley, called the Act a "stinging rebuke" of the Supreme Court's Hamdan v. Rumsfeld ruling, calling that ruling "an unprecedented attempt by the court to rewrite the law of war and intrude into war policy." Yoo cited Johnson v. Eisentrager, in which the court decided that it would not hear habeas claims brought by alien enemy prisoners held outside the US and refused to interpret the Geneva Conventions to give rights in civilian court against the government.

Formerly Lieutenant Colonel in the US Army Judge Advocate General's Corps and current professor at St. Mary's University School of Law, Jeffrey Addicott wrote "the new Military Commissions Act reflects a clear and much-needed Congressional commitment to the war on terror, which to this point has been largely conducted in legal terms by the executive branch with occasional interjections from the judiciary".

George W. Bush, President of the United States:

Today, the Senate sent a strong signal to the terrorists that we will continue using every element of national power to pursue our enemies and to prevent attacks on America. The Military Commissions Act of 2006 will allow the continuation of a CIA program that has been one of America's most potent tools in fighting the war on terror. Under this program, suspected terrorists have been detained and questioned about threats against our country. Information we have learned from the program has helped save lives at home and abroad. By authorizing the creation of military commissions, the Act will also allow us to prosecute suspected terrorists for war crimes.

John McCain, United States Senator:

Simply put, this legislation ensures that we respect our obligations under Geneva, recognizes the President's constitutional authority to interpret treaties, and brings accountability and transparency to the process of interpretation by ensuring that the executive's interpretation is made public. I would note that there has been opposition to this legislation from some quarters, including the New York Times editorial page. Without getting into a point-by-point rebuttal here on the floor, I would simply say that I have been reading the Congressional Record trying to find the bill that page so vociferously denounced. The hyperbolic attack is aimed not at any bill this body is today debating, nor even at the Administration's original position. I can only presume that some would prefer that Congress simply ignore the Hamdan decision, and pass no legislation at all. That, I suggest to my colleagues, would be a travesty.

== Criticism ==
=== MCA ruled unconstitutional re: suspension of habeas corpus ===
The Supreme Court of the United States ruled in Boumediene v. Bush (2008) that the MCA constituted an unconstitutional encroachment of habeas corpus rights, and established jurisdiction for federal courts to hear petitions for habeas corpus from Guantanamo detainees tried under the Act. As such, the provisions of MCA suspending Habeas Corpus are no longer in effect.

A number of legal scholars and Congressional members—including Senator Arlen Specter, who was a Republican and the Ranking Member of the Senate Judiciary Committee—previously criticized the habeas provision of the Act as violating a clause of the Constitution that says the right to challenge detention "shall not be suspended" except in cases of "rebellion or invasion".

In the House debate, Representative David Wu of Oregon offered this scenario:

Let us say that my wife, who is here in the gallery with us tonight, a sixth generation Oregonian, is walking by the friendly, local military base and is picked up as an unlawful enemy combatant. What is her recourse? She says, "I am a U.S. citizen". That is a jurisdictional fact under this statute, and she will not have recourse to the courts? She can take it to Donald Rumsfeld, but she cannot take it across the street to an article 3 court.

Following debate in the House and Senate, the final law revoked Habeas Corpus protections only for non-citizens:

(e)(1) No court, justice, or judge shall have jurisdiction to hear or consider an application for a writ of habeas corpus filed by or on behalf of an alien detained by the United States who has been determined by the United States to have been properly detained as an enemy combatant or is awaiting such determination.

Hence in the preceding example, if Wu's wife, a citizen, were picked up outside a military base, Wu could walk across the street and file a habeas corpus petition with the courts. Since the Supreme Court in 2008 ruled the restrictions on habeas corpus provisions invalid, in Boumediene v. Bush, non-citizens can also request the courts review the legality of their arrest and imprisonment.

=== Broad definition of enemy combatant ===
According to Bill Goodman, past Legal Director of the Center for Constitutional Rights, and Joanne Mariner, from FindLaw, this bill redefines unlawful enemy combatant in such a broad way that it refers to any person who is

engaged in hostilities or who has purposefully and materially supported hostilities against the United States.

From Section 950q. Principals:

Any person is punishable as a principal under this chapter who commits an offense punishable by this chapter, or aids, abets, counsels, commands, or procures its commission.

This makes it possible for US citizens to be designated unlawful enemy combatant because

it could be read to include anyone who has donated money to a charity for orphans in Afghanistan that turns out to have some connection to the Taliban or a person organizing an anti-war protest in Washington, D.C.

Jennifer Van Bergen, a journalist with a law degree, responds to the comment that habeas corpus has never been afforded to foreign combatants with the suggestion that, using the current sweeping definition of war on terror and unlawful combatant, it is impossible to know where the battlefield is and who combatants are. Also, she notes that most of the detentions are already unlawful.

The Act also suggests that unlawful enemy combatant refers to any person

who, before, on, or after the date of the enactment of the Military Commissions Act of 2006, has been determined to be an unlawful enemy combatant by a Combatant Status Review Tribunal or another competent tribunal established under the authority of the President or the Secretary of Defense.

Some commentators have interpreted this to mean that if the President says you are an enemy combatant, then you effectively are.

Passing laws that remove the few checks against mistreatment of prisoners will not help us win the battle for the hearts and minds of the generation of young people around the world being recruited by Osama bin Laden and al Qaeda. Authorizing indefinite detention of anybody the Government designates, without any proceeding and without any recourse—is what our worst critics claim the United States would do, not what American values, traditions and our rule of law would have us do. This is not just a bad bill, this is a dangerous bill.

— Patrick Leahy, United States Senator

One Bush administration critic described the Act as "the legalization of the José Padilla treatment"—referring to the American citizen who was declared an unlawful enemy combatant and then imprisoned for three years before finally being charged with a lesser crime than was originally alleged. A legal brief filed on Padilla's behalf alleges that during his imprisonment Padilla was subjected to sensory deprivation, sleep deprivation, and enforced stress positions. He continues to be held by the United States and now has access to US courts.

=== Claims the MCA is an unconstitutional ex post facto law ===
Another criticism is that the Act violates the Constitution's prohibition against ex post facto laws. Pro human rights group Human Rights First stated that "In violation of this fundamental tenet of the rule of law, defendants could be convicted for actions that were not illegal when they were taken." Joanne Mariner, an attorney who serves as the Terrorism and Counterterrorism Program Director at Human Rights Watch, described the issue this way:

The MCA states that it does not create any new crimes, but simply codifies offenses "that have traditionally been triable by military commissions." This provision is meant to convince the courts that there are no ex post facto problems with the offenses that the bill lists. In Hamdan v. Rumsfeld, however, a plurality of the Supreme Court (four justices) found that conspiracy—one of the offenses enumerated in the MCA—was not a crime triable by military commission. The bill's statement that conspiracy is a traditional war crime, does not, by legislative fiat, make it so.

Law professor John P. Cerone, the co-chair of the American Society of International Law Human Rights Interest Group, adds that the Act "risks running afoul of the principle against ex post facto criminalization, as recognized in international law (article 15 of the International Covenant on Civil and Political Rights) as well as US constitutional law."

=== Protections from criminal and civil prosecutions for previous instances of alleged torture ===
Two provisions of the MCA have been criticized for allegedly making it harder to prosecute and convict officers and employees of the US government for misconduct in office.

First, the MCA changed the definition of war crimes for which US government defendants can be prosecuted. Under the War Crimes Act of 1996, any violation of Common Article 3 of the Geneva Conventions was considered a war crime and could be criminally prosecuted. Section 6 of the Military Commissions Act amended the War Crimes Act so that only actions specifically defined as "grave breaches" of Common Article 3 could be the basis for a prosecution, and it made that definition retroactive to November 26, 1997. The specific actions defined in section 6 of the Military Commissions Act include torture, cruel or inhumane treatment, murder, mutilation or maiming, intentionally causing serious bodily harm, rape, sexual assault or abuse, and the taking of hostages. According to Mariner of Human Rights Watch, the effect is "that perpetrators of several categories of what were war crimes at the time they were committed, can no longer be punished under U.S. law." The Center for Constitutional Rights adds:

The MCA's restricted definitions arguably would exempt certain U.S. officials who have implemented or had command responsibility for coercive interrogation techniques from war crimes prosecutions.
. ...
This amendment is designed to protect U.S. government perpetrators of abuses during the "war on terror" from prosecution.

In 2005, a provision of the Detainee Treatment Act (section 1004(a)) had created a new defense as well as a provision to providing counsel for agents involved in the detention and interrogation of individuals "believed to be engaged in or associated with international terrorist activity". The 2006 MCA amended section 1004(a) of the Detainee Treatment Act to guarantee free counsel in the event of civil or criminal prosecution and applied the above mentioned legal defense to prosecutions for conduct that occurred during the period September 11, 2001 to December 30, 2005. Although the provision recognizes the possibility of civil and or criminal proceedings, the Center for Constitutional Rights has criticised this claiming that "The MCA retroactively immunizes some U.S. officials who have engaged in illegal actions which have been authorized by the Executive."

=== Other claims the MCA is a violation of human rights ===
Amnesty International said that the Act "contravenes human rights principles." and an editorial in The New York Times described the Act as "a tyrannical law that will be ranked with the low points in American democracy, our generation's version of the Alien and Sedition Acts," while American Civil Liberties Union Executive Director Anthony D. Romero said, "The president can now, with the approval of Congress, indefinitely hold people without charge, take away protections against horrific abuse, put people on trial based on hearsay evidence, authorize trials that can sentence people to death based on testimony literally beaten out of witnesses, and slam shut the courthouse door for habeas petitions."

Jonathan Turley, professor of constitutional law at George Washington University, called the Military Commissions Act of 2006 "a huge sea change for our democracy. The framers created a system where we did not have to rely on the good graces or good mood of the president. In fact, Madison said that he created a system essentially to be run by devils, where they could not do harm, because we didn't rely on their good motivations. Now we must."

Nat Hentoff opined in the Village Voice that

"conditions of confinement and a total lack of the due process that the Supreme Court ordered in Rasul v. Bush and Hamdan v. Rumsfeld" make US government officials culpable for war crimes.

== Application ==
Immediately after Bush signed the Act into law, the U.S. Justice Department notified the U.S. Court of Appeals for the District of Columbia that the Court no longer had jurisdiction over a combined habeas case that it had been considering since 2004. A notice dated the following day listed 196 other pending habeas cases for which it made the same claim.

=== First use ===
On November 13, 2006, the Department of Justice asserted in a motion with the U.S. Court of Appeals for the Fourth Circuit that, according to the Act, Ali Saleh Kahlah al-Marri should be tried in a military tribunal as an enemy combatant rather than in a civilian court. The document begins with:

Pursuant to Federal Rule of Appellate Procedure and Local Rule 27(f), respondent-appellee Commander S.L. Wright respectfully moves this Court to remand this case to the district court with instructions to dismiss it for lack of subject matter jurisdiction. Respondent-appellee has conferred with counsel for petitioner-appellant, and they agree with the briefing schedule proposed below. As explained below, the Military Commissions Act of 2006 (MCA), Pub. L. No. 109-366 (see Attachment 1), which took effect on October 17, 2006, removes federal court jurisdiction over pending and future habeas corpus actions and any other actions filed by or on behalf of detained aliens determined by the United States to be enemy combatants, such as petitioner-appellant al- Marri, except as provided in Section 1005(e)(2) and (e)(3) of the Detainee Treatment Act (DTA). In plain terms, the MCA removes this Court's jurisdiction (as well as the district court's) over al-Marri's habeas action. Accordingly, the Court should dismiss this appeal for lack of jurisdiction and remand the case to the district court with instructions to dismiss the petition for lack of jurisdiction.

=== Initial prosecutions ===
Of the first three war crimes cases brought against Guantanamo Bay detainees under the MCA, one resulted in a plea bargain and the two others were dismissed on jurisdictional grounds.

The first person prosecuted under the MCA was David Matthew Hicks, an Australian. The outcome of his trial was prescribed by a pre-trial agreement negotiated between Hicks's defense counsel and the convening authority, Susan J. Crawford on March 26, 2007. The agreement stipulated an effective sentence of nine months in exchange for his guilty plea and compliance with other conditions. On March 31, 2007, the tribunal handed down a seven-year sentence, of which all but nine months was suspended, with the remainder to be served in Australia.

On June 4, 2007, in two separate cases, military tribunals dismissed charges against detainees who had been designated as "enemy combatants" but not as "unlawful enemy combatants". The first case was that of Omar Khadr, a Canadian who had been designated as an "enemy combatant" in 2004. Khadr was accused of throwing a grenade during a firefight in Afghanistan in 2002. Colonel Peter Brownback ruled that the military tribunals, created to deal with "unlawful enemy combatants," had no jurisdiction over detainees who had been designated only as "enemy combatants." He dismissed without prejudice all charges against Khadr. Also on June 4, Captain Keith J. Allred reached the same conclusion in the case of Salim Ahmed Hamdan.

The United States Department of Defense responded by stating: "We believe that Congress intended to grant jurisdiction under the Military Commissions Act to individuals, like Mr. Khadr, who are being held as enemy combatants under existing C.S.R.T. procedures." That position was called "dead wrong" by Specter.

== Court challenge ==
On December 13, 2006, Salim Ahmed Hamdan challenged the MCA's declination of habeas corpus to "alien unlawful enemy combatants" in the United States District Court for the District of Columbia. Judge James Robertson, who ruled in favor of Hamdan in the Hamdan v. Rumsfeld case, refused to rule in favor of Hamdan in this case regarding habeas corpus, writing:

The Constitution does not provide alien enemy combatants detained at Guantanamo Bay with the constitutional right to file a petition for habeas corpus in our civilian courts, and thus Congress may regulate those combatants' access to the courts.

In April 2007, the Supreme Court declined to hear two cases challenging the MCA: Boumediene v. Bush and Al Odah v. United States. On June 29, 2007, the court reversed that decision, releasing an order that expressed their intent to hear the challenge. The two cases have been consolidated into one. Oral arguments were heard on December 5, 2007. The decision, extending habeas corpus rights to alien unlawful enemy combatants but allowing the commissions to continue to prosecute war crimes, was handed down on June 12, 2008.

Even though detainees now have the right to challenge the government's basis of their detention, that does not guarantee release as evidenced by the December 14, 2009 ruling of U.S. District Judge Thomas F. Hogan who upheld continued detention of Musa'ab Al-Madhwani in Guantanamo Bay, Cuba even though the court determined that he was not a continuing threat, the government met its burden of proving he was a member of al-Qaeda.

== See also ==
- Amnesty law
- Criminal Investigation Task Force
- Enemy Belligerent Interrogation, Detention, and Prosecution Act of 2010
- Extrajudicial prisoners of the United States
- Ghost detainee
- Military Police: Enemy Prisoners of War, Retained Personnel, Civilian Internees and Other Detainees
- National Defense Authorization Act for Fiscal Year 2012
