= 'Abd al-Rahim =

'Abd al-Raḥīm (ALA-LC romanization of Arabic: عبد الرحيم) is a male Muslim given name, and in modern usage, surname. It is built from the Arabic words 'abd, al-Raḥīm, one of the names of God in the Qur'an, which give rise to the Muslim theophoric names. It means "servant of the merciful".

Because the letter r is a sun letter, the letter l of the al- is assimilated to it. Thus, although the name is written in Arabic with letters corresponding to Abd al-Rahim, the standard pronunciation corresponds to Abd ar-Rahim. Alternative transliterations include Abdel Raheem, Abdur Raheem, Abdul Rahiem and other regional linguistic variations, and subject to variant spacing or hyphenation.

It may refer to:

== Given name ==
- Nasir al-Din Abu al-Fath Abd al-Rahim ibn Abi Mansur (died 1257), Nizari Ismaili governor of Quhistan
- Abd al-Rahim ibn al-Husain al-'Iraqi (1325–1403), Shafi'i scholar of hadith
- Abdul Rahim Khan-I-Khana (1556–1627), Indian poet
- Abdur Rahim (judge) (1867–1952), Indian judge and politician
- Abdurrahim bey Hagverdiyev (1870–1933), Azerbaijani playwright, stage director and politician
- Abd al-Rahim al-Hajj Muhammad, (1892–1939), Palestinian commander of the 1936–39 Arab revolt in Palestine
- Abdurrahim Hojibayev (1900–1938), Tajik politician in the Soviet Union
- Abdul Rahim (Indian politician) (1902–1977), member of the Indian National Congress
- Abdurrahim Buza (1905–1987), an Albanian painter
- Abdur Rahim (scholar) (1918–1986), a Muslim scholar and politician of the Bangladesh Jamaat-e-Islami.
- Abdulrahim Abby Farah (1919–2018), Somali diplomat
- Abdul Rahim Khan (1925–1990), Commander-in-Chief of the Pakistan Air Force
- Abdul Rahim Hatef (1926–2013), Afghan politician
- Abdul Rahim Sarban (1930–1993), Afghan singer, known as "Sarban"
- Abdul Rahim Malhas (1937–2012), Jordanian politician
- Abdul Rahim Nagori (1939–2011), Pakistani painter
- Abdul Rahim Wardak (born 1940 (?)), Afghan politician
- Abdul Rahim Mourad (born 1942), Lebanese politician
- Abed Elrahim Abu Zakrra (1943–1989), Sudanese writer, poet, and translator
- Abdel Rahim Mohammed Hussein (born 1949), Sudanese politician
- Abdurrahim El-Keib (born 1950), Libyan electrical engineer turned politician
- Wan Abdul Rahim Wan Abdullah (born 1952), Malaysian politician
- Abdolrahim Mousavi (1960–2026), Iranian general
- Abdul Rahim Muslimdost (born 1960), Pakistani journalist and jeweler held in Guantanamo
- Abdul Rahim Bakri (born 1961), Malaysian politician
- Abdul-Rahim Hamed Aufi (born 1963), Iraqi footballer
- Abd al-Rahim al-Nashiri (born 1965), Saudi held in Guantanamo
- Abdul Al-Rahim Ghulam Rabbani (born 1969), Pakistani held in Guantanamo
- Abderrahim Ouakili (born 1970), Moroccan footballer
- Abderrahim Zitouna (born 1970), Moroccan runner
- Abderrahim El Haouzy (born 1975), Moroccan-French runner
- Abdul Rahim (Guantanamo detainee 549) or Omar Said Salim Al Dayi
- Abdul Rahim (Guantanamo detainee 897) (born c. 1975), Afghan
- Abderrahim Goumri (born 1976), Moroccan runner
- Abderrahim Chkilit (born 1976), Moroccan footballer
- Abdul Rahim Shapiee (1977–2022), Singaporean drug trafficker
- Abd Al Rahim Abdul Rassak Janko (born 1978), Syrian Kurd held in Guantanamo
- Abdulrahim Jumaa (born 1979), UAR footballer
- Abderrahim Essaidi (born 1983), Moroccan footballer
- Abdulrahim Kerimbakiev (born 1983), Kazakh held in Guantanamo
- Abderrahim Najah (born 1984), Moroccan basketball player
- Abderrahim Zhiou (born 1985), Tunisian Paralympic athlete
- Abdul Rahim Ayew (born 1988), Ghanaian footballer
- Abdulrahim Jaizawi (born 1989), Saudi footballer
- Abdulrahim Abdulhameed (born 1990), Bahraini Taekwondo practitioner
- Abdul Rahim Ghafoorzai (died 1997), Afghan politician and diplomat
- Abdur Rahim (general) (died 2021), Bangladeshi Brigadier General and director general of NSI
- Abdul Raheem Glailati, Sudanese poet and journalist
- Abdurrahim Al Murbati, Bahraini held in extrajudicial detention in Saudi Arabia
- Abdul Rahim (Afghan politician), Afghan Communications Minister of the Interim Administration
- Abderahim Mechenouai, Algerian boxer
- Abd al-Rahim al-Hasini, Iraqi politician
- Abdur Rahim (Dhaka politician)
- Abdur Rahim (cricketer) (born 1974), Bangladeshi cricketer
- Abdur Rahim (footballer) (c. 1932-2004), Bangladeshi footballer
- Abdur Rahim (politician, born 1933), Bangladeshi politician
- Abdul Raheem Quraishi, Indian Islamic scholar
- Muhammad Abdur Rahim (1921 - 1981), Bangladeshi historian
- Mohammad Abdur Rahim, Bangladeshi politician
- Abdur Rahim (scientist), Bangladeshi scientist
- Abdul Rahim, athlete who competed for Afghanistan at the 1936 Summer Olympics

== Middle or surname ==
- Abubakar Abdul Rahim (1920–1995), Indian politician
- Behzod Abdurahimov (born 1990), Uzbek pianist
- Besart Abdurahimi (born 1990), Croatian footballer
- Chaudhry Abdul Rahim, Pakistani politician
- Fathi Tawfiq Abdulrahim (born 1970), Yemeni politician
- Gamal Abdel-Rahim (1924–2000), Egyptian classical music composer
- Jalaludin Abdur Rahim (1913–1977), Bengali Pakistani communist politician
- Khalid Abdul Rahim (born 1962), Bahraini businessman
- Manaf Abd al-Rahim al-Rawi (died 2013), Iraqi accused of terrorism
- Mirza Abdul'Rahim Talibov Tabrizi (1834–1911), Iranian Azerbaijani intellectual and social reformer
- Muhadhdhabuddin Abd al-Rahim bin Ali bin Hamid al-Dimashqi, known as Al-Dakhwar (1170–1230), Syrian physician in Ayyubid Egypt
- Nabil Omran Abdul-Rahim (born 1981), Libyan futsal player
- Ramadan Abdel Rehim Mansour (c. 1980–2010), Egyptian criminal
- Shaaban Abdel Rahim (1957–2019), Egyptian popular singer
- Shah Abdur Rahim (1644–1719), 17th century Indian Sufi and scholar and he most sensible person of his time
- Shareef Abdur-Rahim (born 1976), American basketball player and NBA executive
- Sheikh Abdur Rahim (1859–1931), Bengali author
- Mouni Abderrahim (born 1985), Algerian volleyball player
- Ymär Abdrahim (1882–1975), Finnish Tatar businessman

== See also ==
- Abdol Rahim, a village in Hamadan Province, Iran
