= List of Bahraini detainees at Guantanamo Bay =

The United States Department of Defense acknowledges holding six Bahraini detainees in Guantanamo.

A total of 778 captives have been held in extrajudicial detention in the Guantanamo Bay detention camps, in Cuba since the camps opened on January 11, 2002. The camp population peaked in 2004 at approximately 660. Only nineteen new detainees, all "high value detainees" have been transferred there since the United States Supreme Court's ruling in Rasul v. Bush. As of January 6, 2025, 15 detainees remain at Guantanamo Bay.

== Bahraini detainees in Guantanamo ==
isn	name	status	notes
52	Isa Ali Abdulla Almurbati	Transferred	Allegedly a follower of Abu Sayyef.; Allegedly was told that if he went to war and fought the Jihad, he would have a 15,000 Dinar debt forgiven.
60	Adil Kamil Abdullah Al Wadi	Transferred	Alleged to have fought on the front lines.; Allegedly disruptive and aggressive while in detention.; Claimed he traveled to Afghanistan because he was moved by the plight of the refugees.; Released.
159	Abdulla Majid Al Naimi	Transferred	Alleged to have traveled to Afghanistan to fight.
227	Salah Abdul Rasul Ali Abdul Rahman Al Balushi	Transferred	Press observed his second ARB.; Justification for detention unclear.
246	Salman Ebrahim Mohamed Ali Al Khalifa	Transferred	Accused of traveling to Afghanistan.
261	Juma Mohammed Abdul Latif Al Dossary	Transferred	Allegedly delivered a fiery speech in Buffalo NY that was attended by members of the Lackawanna Six.; Says he has been tortured, and has made over a dozen suicide attempts.; Repatriated to Saudi custody, with fifteen other men, on July 16, 2007.
