= Salah Abdul Rasool Al Blooshi =

Guantanamo detainee

- Born: February 12, 1981 (age 45): Muharraq, Bahrain
- Detained at: Guantanamo Bay camp
- Other names: Salah Abdul Rasul Ali Abdul Rahman Al Balushi (Arabic: صلاح عبد الرسول البلوشي)
- ISN: 227
- Charge: No charge
- Status: Repatriated

Salah Abdul Rasool Al Blooshi (Arabic: صلاح عبد الرسول البلوشي) is a Bahraini, who was held in extrajudicial detention in the United States Guantanamo Bay detainment camps, in Cuba.

On May 15, 2006, the U.S. Department of Defense complied with a court order and released a list of the identities of the Guantanamo detainees. The DoD calls him Salah Abdul Rasul Ali Abdul Rahman Al Balushi. His Guantanamo Guantanamo Internment Serial Number was 227. The DoD reports that he was born on February 12, 1981, in Muharraq, Bahrain. Mr Al Blooshi was reportedly arrested by Pakistani authorities after crossing over from Afghanistan in December 2001 and handed over to the US military.

Al Blooshi is represented by Joshua Colangelo-Bryan, Esq. The campaign to free the detainee is being led by Bahraini MP Mohammed Khalid.

== Combatant Status Review Tribunal ==
Combatant Status Review Tribunals were held in a trailer the size of a large RV. The captive sat on a plastic garden chair, with his hands and feet shackled to a bolt in the floor. Three chairs were reserved for members of the press, but only 37 of the 574 Tribunals were observed.

Initially the Bush Presidency asserted that they could withhold all the protections of the Geneva Conventions to captives from the war on terror. This policy was challenged before the Judicial branch. Critics argued that the USA could not evade its obligation to conduct competent tribunals to determine whether captives are, or are not, entitled to the protections of prisoner of war status.

Subsequently the Department of Defense instituted the Combatant Status Review Tribunals. The Tribunals, however, were not authorized to determine whether the captives were lawful combatants—rather they were merely empowered to make a recommendation as to whether the captive had previously been correctly determined to match the Bush Presidency's definition of an enemy combatant.

=== Summary of Evidence memo ===
A Summary of Evidence memo was prepared for Salah Abdul Rasul Ali Abdul Rahman Al Balushi's Combatant Status Review Tribunal, on September 23, 2004. The memo listed the following allegations against him:

a. The detainee is associated with al Qaida:
1. The detainee traveled from Bahrain to Afghanistan via Pakistan in August 2001.
2. Upon arriving in Kandahar, the Detainee spent two weeks in a guesthouse.
3. The detainee's host while staying in Kandahar is a suspected al Qaida recruiter.
4. At the suggestion of the suspected recruiter, the detainee gave his passport to a scholar at a local institute.
5. The scholar to whom the detainee gave his passport is an al Qaida recruiter.
6. An alias used by the detainee, and the name of the person to whom he gave his passport, were found on a lists discovered during searches of suspected al Qaida safe houses in Afghanistan during November 2001.
7. While in a Jalalaba hospital, the detainee met an Egyptian, and then traveled with him to a small village.
8. The Egyptian has been identified as an al Qaida commander and trainer.
9. The Egyptian fought in the front lines with the Taliban against the Northern Alliance.
10. The detainee was captured by Pakistani authorities in December 2001 as he fled Afghanistan.

=== Transcript ===
There is no record that captive 227 participated in his Combatant Status Review Tribunal.

== Habeas corpus ==
A writ of habeas corpus, Salah Abdul Rasul Ali Abdul Rahman Al Balushi v. George W. Bush, was submitted on captive 227's behalf. In response, on October 12, 2004, the Department of Defense released 16 pages of unclassified documents related to his Combatant Status Review Tribunal.

The Legal Advisor's declaration was drafted by Commander James R. Crisfield Jr., a JAG officer. His enemy combatant status was confirmed by Tribunal panel 6 on September 28, 2004.

The Detainee election form prepared by his Personal Representative on 27 September 2004 stated:

Detainee #### unclassified summary was read to him. He asked questions and read the translated unclassified summary himself. At the conclusion of the interview, he affirmatively declined to participate in the Tribunal. In addition, he stated he does not want me to present any evidence or make any statements on his behalf. He was asked if he would regret not participating in the Tribunal if he is found to be an EC. He stated he would not.

== Administrative Review Board hearing ==
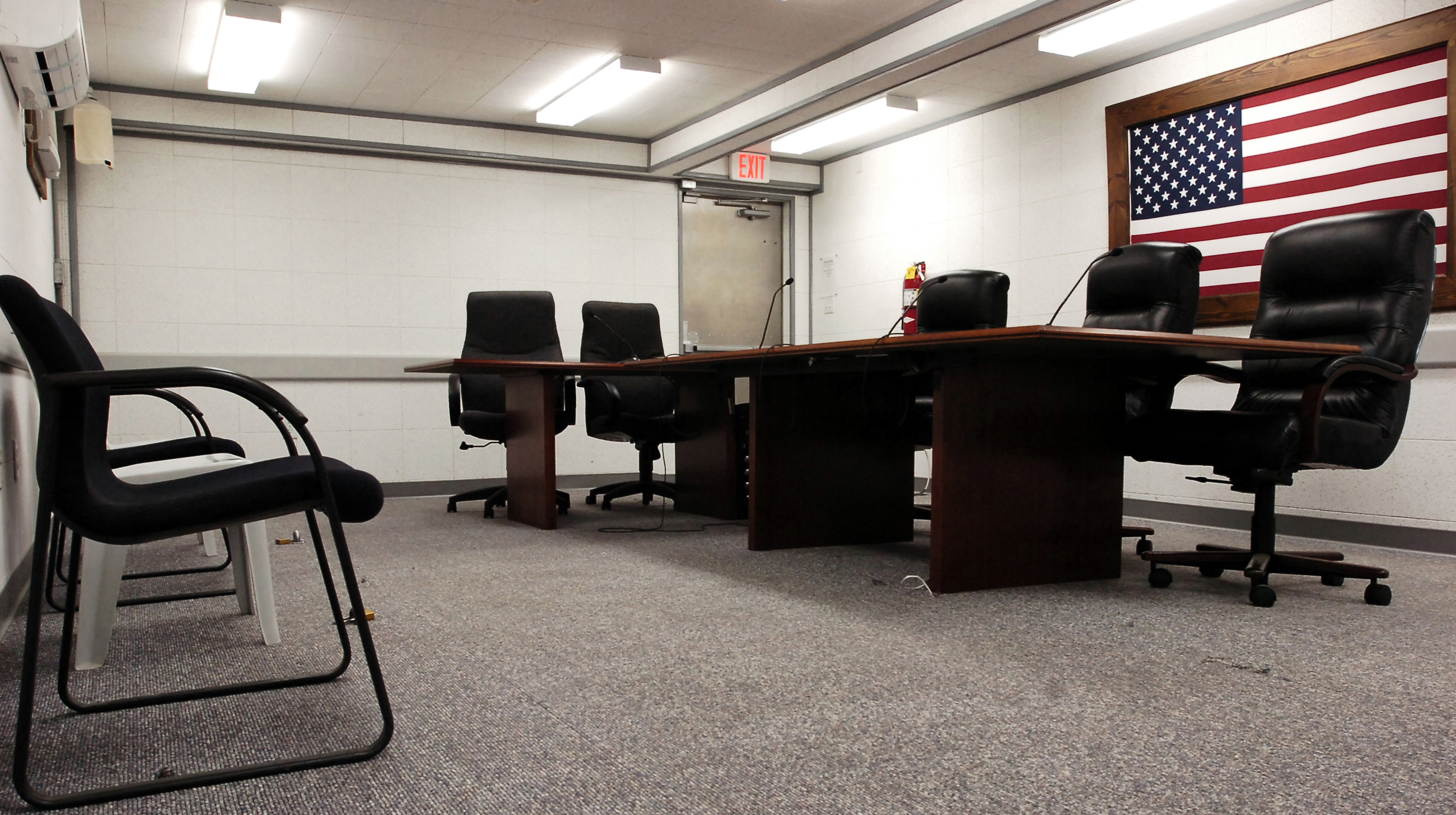
Hearing room where Guantanamo captive's annual Administrative Review Board hearings convened for captives whose Combatant Status Review Tribunal had already determined they were an "enemy combatant".

Detainees who were determined to have been properly classified as "enemy combatants" were scheduled to have their dossier reviewed at annual Administrative Review Board hearings. The Administrative Review Boards were not authorized to review whether a detainee qualified for POW status, nor were they authorized to review whether a detainee should have been classified as an "enemy combatant".

They were authorized to consider whether a detainee should continue to be detained by the United States, because they continued to pose a threat, or whether they could safely be repatriated to the custody of their home country, or whether they could be set free.

=== First annual Administrative Review Board ===
A Summary of Evidence memo was prepared for Salah Abdul Rasul Ali Abdul Al Balushi's first annual Administrative Review Board, on January 28, 2005. The memo listed factors for and against his continued detention.

The following primary factors favor continued detention

a. Commitment
1. The detainee traveled from Bahrain to Afghanistan via Pakistan in August 2001.

b. Connection
1. Upon arriving in Kandahar, the detainee spent two weeks in a guesthouse.
2. The detainee's host while staying in Kandahar is a suspect al Qaida recruiter.
3. At the suggestion of the suspected recruiter, the detainee gave his passport to a scholar at a local institute.
4. The scholar to whom the detainee gave his passport is an Qaida recruiter.
5. An alias used by the detainee, and the name of the person to whom he gave his passport, were found on lists discovered during searches of suspected al Qaida safe houses in Afghanistan during November 2001.
6. While in a Jalalabad hospital, the detainee met an Egyptian, and then traveled with him to a small village.
7. The Egyptian has been identified as an al Qaida commander and trainer.
8. The Egyptian fought in the front lines with the Taliban against the Northern Alliance.
9. The detainee was captured by Pakistani authorities in December 2001, as he fled Afghanistan.

The following primary factors favor release or transfer

N/A

==== Letter from Mark S. Sullivan ====
The Department of Defense did not publish the transcript from captive 227's Board hearing. It did publish a redacted version of a two-page letter from Mark S. Sullivan, one of the lawyers helping him access the US justice system, dated January 19, 2005, entitled: "Administrative Review Board Submission for Salah Abdul Rasul Al Bloushi, ISN # 227." They also published an unsigned note.

Sullivan's letter stated, in part:

There is no reliable evidence that Mr. Al Bloushi is, or has ever been, a threat to the United States or its allies. ..

The following factors should be taken into consideration by the ARB with respect to the continued detention of Mr. Al Bloushi:

- He was not captured on or near any battlefield. Instead, he was taken into custody in Pakistan by the Pakistani authorities.

- There is no credible evidence that he participated in any hostilities against the US or its allies.

- ############# ############ ############# ############## ########### ############# ############ ########### ##### ############ ############# ############## ########### ############# ############ ########### ######### ############ ############# ############## ########### ############# ############ ########### ######### This thin reed of speculation and innuendo is hardly sufficient evidence to establish that Mr. Al Bloushi is a member or [sic] al Qaida or any other terrorist organization, or to justify his indefinite incarceration.

The unsigned note said:

Classification was derived form classified enclosure + exhibits to the Combatant Status Review Tribunal Decision Report, which is attached to a memorandum for Director, CSRT entitled: CSRT Record of Proceedings ICO ISN #227, dated 30 Sep 2004

=== Second annual Administrative Review Board ===
The Gulf Daily News reported, on July 2, 2006, that Colangelo-Bryan summarized the allegations against al Blooshi from his second Administrative Review Board.

1. Specifically, the military asserts that Salah went to Afghanistan long before September 11, 2001, when he heard about Buddhist statues being destroyed at Bamyan.
2. According to the military, Salah went there to make sure that Afghans were Salafi Muslims.
3. The military also says that Salah had 300 Bahraini dinars with him and that he stayed with a friend for two weeks in Kandahar.
4. According to the military, this friend suggested that Salah give his passport to a man who is said to be associated in some way with Al Qaeda.
5. Finally, the military said that Salah became sick for a month in Jalabad and then travelled to Afghan/Pakistani border.

Colangelo-Bryan asked how, even if the allegations were true, they showed that Al Blooshi had ever represented a threat to the USA.

==== Summary of Evidence ====
In September 2007, the DoD released a Summary of Evidence memo prepared for Salah Abdul Rasul Ali Abdul Rahman Al Balushi's second annual Administrative Review Board, on January 30, 2006. The memo listed factors for and against his continued detention.

The following primary factors favor continued detention

a. Commitment
1. The detainee became interested in traveling to Afghanistan after he heard about the destruction of the Buddha statues in the Barnian Province of Afghanistan. The detainee was further convinced after the return of an unidentified group of sheiks. The sheiks initially went to Afghanistan to persuade the Taliban to quit destroying statues, but ended up changing their minds and endorsing the act.
2. The detainee wanted to go to Afghanistan to ensure that the people were real Muslims, meaning if the people were Salafi Muslims
3. The detainee traveled to the Baluchistan Province in Pakistan via Karachi, Pakistan on 25 July 2001 and stayed with a friend for three weeks. Afterwards, he traveled to Afghanistan around August 2001 via Quetta, Pakistan.
4. The detainee stated he paid for his trip to Afghanistan with 300 Bahraini Dinars and money he saved while attending Jaammat Islamia University in Medina, Saudi Arabia. In addition, the detainee received approximately 84 Bahraini Dinars per month as a stipend from the university. The detainee was a student at the university for approximately one year prior to his departure for Afghanistan.

b. Connections/Associations
1. Upon arriving in Kandahar, Afghanistan, the detainee spent two weeks in the house of an acquaintance.
2. At the suggestion of the acquaintance who he lived with in Kandahar, the detainee gave his passport to a scholar at a local institute.
3. The scholar was identified as an initial al Qaida screener. He was particularly known for talking a lot about jihad. The scholar was a helper, a coordinator, and he was the one responsible for travel.
4. The detainee's name was found on a list of captured Mujahidin on a computer, which was associated with an operative and was seized during raids with a foreign governmental agency on 1 March 2003.
5. The detainee's name was found on a document listing 324 Arabic names, aliases, and nationalities recovered from safe house raids associated with suspected al Qaida members.

c. Other Relevant Data
1. The detainee claims he became sick in Jalalabad and spent a month in a hospital. After being released from this hospital, the detainee traveled with a man to the border between Afghanistan and Pakistan.
2. The detainee claims to have a learning disability, which makes it very difficult for him to remember details or events.
3. On 18 August 2005, the detainee was not willing to cooperate and refused to discuss his case.

The following primary factors favor release or transfer

a. The detainee denied having any knowledge of the attacks in the United States prior to their execution on 11 September 2001, and also denied knowledge of any rumors or plans of future attacks on the United States or United States interests.

b. The detainee denied having any knowledge of planning of internal uprisings at the Guantanamo Detention Facility.

c. The detainee denied using any type of Taliban communication equipment.

d. An individual asked the detainee to join the Taliban. The detainee stated he did not wish to join the Talivan and told the individual the same.

e. The detainee was confronted concerning an unknown number that he had in his Casio watch. The detainee stated his watch was incapable of number storage and, as a result, did not have any information on the number.

=== Board recommendations ===
In early September 2007, the Department of Defense released two heavily redacted memos, from his Board, to Gordon R. England, the Designated Civilian Official. The Board's recommendation was unanimous The Board's recommendation was redacted. England authorized his transfer on June 15, 2006.

His Board concluded that he "...continues to be a threat to the United States and its allies."

== Al Blooshi's last interrogation ==
On July 23, 2006, Colangelo-Bryan described Al Blooshi's last interrogation. He said that the camp authorities acknowledge that 75% of the detainees are no longer interrogated. He estimated that even fewer detainees are currently being interrogated than US spokesment acknowledged.

Al Blooshi has not been interrogated at all in 2006. Colangelo-Bryan said that during his last interrogation Al Blooshi was asked about his activities in the war in Bosnia in 1995.

Salah responded that he had been aged 14 in 1995 and wasn't anywhere near Bosnia.

When Salah refused to get into a long discussion in response to such a silly question, his interrogator said that he didn't want Salah to stay at Guantanamo until his hair turned white.

Salah understood this statement as a threat.

— Colangelo-Bryan

== Release ==
Salah has been released.

On Thursday August 23, 2007, the Gulf Daily News reported that Bahraini Member of Parliament Mohammed Khalid had called for the Bahrain government to provide financial compensation to the released men.

== See also ==
- Abdulla Majid Al Naimi
- Adel Kamel Hajee
- Bahraini captives in Guantanamo
- Essa Al Murbati
- Juma Mohammed Al Dossary
- Shaikh Salman Ebrahim Mohamed Ali Al Khalifa
