= Adil Kamil al-Wadi =

Bahraini Guantanamo detainee

Adil Kamil Abdullah Al Wadi
- Born: 1964 (age 61–62); Muharraq, Bahrain
- Detained at: Guantanamo
- Other name: Adel Kamel Abdulla Hajee
- ISN: 60
- Charge: No charge (held in extrajudicial detention)
- Status: Repatriated

Adil Kamil Abdullah Al Wadi is a citizen of Bahrain who was held in extrajudicial detention in the United States Guantanamo Bay detainment camps, in Cuba. Al Wadi's Guantanamo Internment Serial Number was 60. American intelligence analysts estimate that Al Wadi was born in 1964, in Muharraq, Bahrain.

Adil Kamil Abdullah al Wadi was captured near the Pakistan-Afghan border and was transferred to Bahrain on November 4, 2005.

== Combatant Status Review Tribunal ==
Combatant Status Review Tribunals were held in a 3 × 5 meter trailer. The captive sat with his hands and feet shackled to a bolt in the floor. Three chairs were reserved for members of the press, but only 37 of the 574 Tribunals were observed.

Initially the Bush administration asserted that they could withhold all the protections of the Geneva Conventions from detainees from the war on terror. This policy was challenged before the Judicial branch. Critics argued that the USA could not evade its obligation to conduct competent tribunals to determine whether detainees are, or are not, entitled to the protections of prisoner of war status.

Subsequently, the Department of Defense instituted the Combatant Status Review Tribunals. The Tribunals, however, were not authorized to determine whether the detainees were lawful combatants—rather they were merely empowered to make a recommendation as to whether the detainee had previously been correctly determined to match the Bush administration's definition of an enemy combatant.

Al Wadi chose to participate in his Combatant Status Review Tribunal.

=== Allegations ===
The allegations Al Wadi faced, in the "Summary of Evidence" presented to his Tribunal were:

a. The detainee associated with al Qaeda:
1. The Detainee traveled to Afghanistan via Iran in late September or early October 2001.

b. The detainee participated in military operations against the coalition.
1. The Detainee was a fighter at Tora Bora.
2. Detainee was captured by the Pakistani military after leaving Afghanistan.

== Administrative Review Board hearing ==
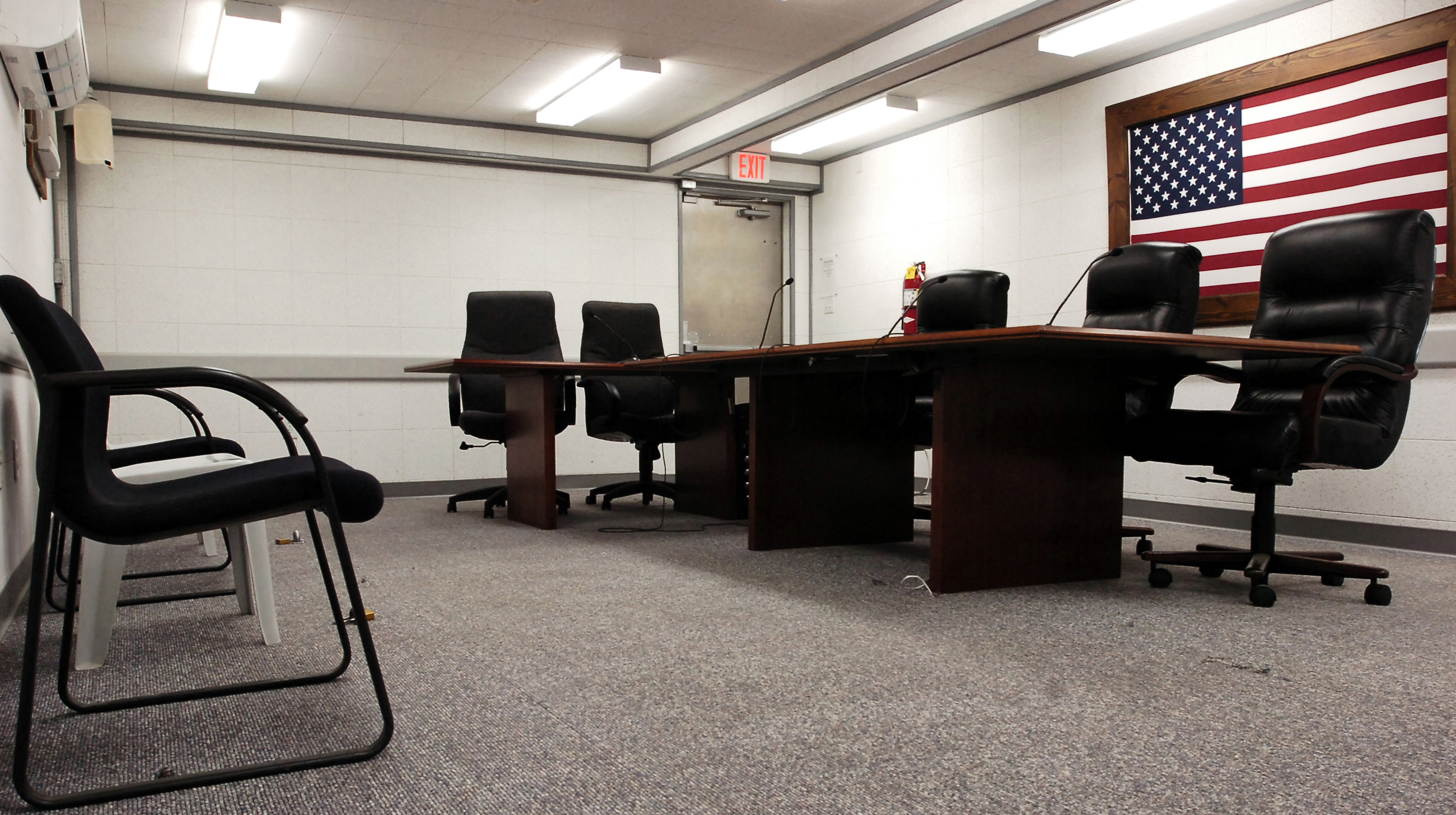
Hearing room where Guantanamo detainee's annual Administrative Review Board hearings convened for captives whose Combatant Status Review Tribunal had already determined they were an "enemy combatant".

Detainees who were determined to have been properly classified as "enemy combatants" were scheduled to have their dossier reviewed at annual Administrative Review Board hearings. The Administrative Review Boards weren't authorized to review whether a detainee qualified for POW status, and they weren't authorized to review whether a detainee should have been classified as an "enemy combatant".

They were authorized to consider whether a detainee should continue to be detained by the United States, because they continued to pose a threat—or whether they could safely be repatriated to the custody of their home country, or whether they could be set free.

The factors for and against continuing to detain %s were among the 121 that the Department of Defense released on March 3, 2006.

The following primary factors favor continued detention:

a. Intent
1. The Detainee traveled to Afghanistan via Iran in late September or early October 2001.

b. Commitment
1. The Detainee was a fighter at Tora Bora.
2. The detainee has been disruptive and aggressive while in detention.

c. Other Relevant Data
1. Detainee was captured by the Pakistani military after leaving Afghanistan.

The following primary factors favor release or transfer:

a. The detainee denies being a member of al Qaida.

b. The detainee denies fighting in the Tora Bora region.

c. The detainee cites that he was not captured by the Pakistani authorities; but, he turned himself in.

=== Transcript ===
Al Wadi chose to participate in his Administrative Review Board hearing.

== Release ==
Al Wadi, and the other five Bahrainis, are represented by Joshua Colangelo-Bryan.

The Gulf Daily News announced on November 5, 2005, that Adel had been released, and was one of three Bahraini detainees on their way home.

On Thursday August 23, 2007, the Gulf Daily News reported that Bahraini Member of Parliament Mohammed Khalid had called for the Bahrain government to provide financial compensation to the released men.

== Op-ed ==
Kamel Abdulla wrote an op-ed about his experiences in Guantanamo in The Media Line, on December 28, 2006.

He wrote:

- The prison was under the control of Psychiatrists who tried their best to drive the captives crazy.
- The captives weren't allowed sunlight. Their cells were under constant illumination from artificial light.

== McClatchy News Service interview ==
On June 15, 2008, the McClatchy News Service published a series of articles based on interviews with 66 former Guantanamo detainees. Adil Kamil al Wadi was one of the former detainees who had an article profiling him.

In his McClatchy interview, Adil Kamil al Wadi reported religious persecution in the Kandahar detention facility and in Guantanamo. He gave a detailed account of Koran desecration.

The McClatchy article quoted Mark Sullivan, Adil Kamil al Wadi's habeas corpus attorney, who had seen the classified allegations against him:

There was an absolute lack of evidence that would disprove anything he said. There was no credible evidence.

You have stories like Adil's: It sounds plausible, but if you were of a suspicious mind you could say it's vague ... and we don't have any corroboration. But what we keep coming back to is what does the government have in the way of proof?

== See also ==
- Juma Mohammed Al Dossary
- Essa Al Murbati
- Salah Abdul Rasool Al Blooshi
- Shaikh Salman Ebrahim Mohamed Ali Al Khalifa
- Abdulla Majid Al Naimi
