= Lutfur Rahman (Bangladeshi politician) =

Bangladeshi politician

- লুৎফুর রহমান

Sylhet-6 Jatiya Sangsad
- Preceded by: Abdur Rahim
- Succeeded by: Syed Makbul Hossain
- In office 1979–1986

Personal details
- Born: Sylhetj, Bangladesh
- Died: Sylhet
- Party: Bangladesh Nationalist Party

Lutfur Rahman was a politician in Sylhet District of Bangladesh. He was elected a member of parliament of Bangladesh Nationalist Party candidate from Sylhet-6 (Golapgonj-Beanibazar) seat in the second parliamentary election of the 1979 year.
