= Abdur Rahim (politician, born 1933) =

Bangladeshi politician

Advocate Abdur Rahim
- আব্দুর রহিম

Member of the Jatiya Sangsad
- In office 7 March 1973 – 6 November 1979
- Preceded by: None
- Succeeded by: Lutfur Rahman
- Constituency: Sylhet-6

Member of the East Pakistan Provincial Assembly
- In office 1970 – 16 December 1971
- Constituency: NE-126 (Sylhet-VII)

Personal details
- Born: 1933 Beanibazar, Sylhet district, British Raj
- Died: 19 March 1990 (aged 56–57) Bangladesh
- Party: Bangladesh Awami League

Abdur Rahim (Bengali: আব্দুর রহিম; 1933 – 19 March 1990) was one of the organizers of the War of Liberation, MP, Advocate and MNA Pakistan. He was elected a Member of Parliament in the Sylhet-6 (formerly Sylhet-11) constituency at the 1973 Bangladeshi general election.

== Early life and education ==
Abdur Rahim was born in 1933, to a Bengali Muslim family in the village of Rautgram in Beanibazar, Sylhet District, British Raj. The family later moved to Kalidaspara in nearby Golapganj. His father's name was Masim Ali. Abdur Rahim completed his studies at the Mathiura SE School and The Aided High School. He then enrolled at the Karachi Islami College in Sindh, West Pakistan. His Bachelor of Laws was awarded by the Sylhet Law College, after which he completed his CSP examination.

== Career ==
Abdur Rahim has long served as general secretary and president of Sylhet Bar.

=== Political life ===
Abdur Rahim joined the National Awami Party in 1962. He served as the convener of Sylhet District NAP (Muzaffar) for 1967–1969. Abdur Rahim defeated by participating in the National Assembly elections in Pakistan on 1960 and 1965. After the NAP split, he joined the Awami League. He was candidate for Awami League, was elected as a member of the Local People's Council of Pakistan (MNA) of the 1970 year. He was a member of the constitution-drafting party of the 1972 Constitution. He was elected a Member of Parliament the Sylhet-6 (former Sylhet-11) constituency in the 1st parliamentary elections of the 1973 year. He was elected as the president of Sylhet district Awami League in 1976. Same year he was a member of the Central Executive Committee.

== Death ==
He died on 19 March 1990. In order to protect his memory, Abdur Rahim Memorial Council was established on behalf of his family.

== See also ==
- 1973 Bangladeshi general election
