= Isa Ali Abdullah al Murbati =

Bahraini Guantanamo detainee

Issa Ali Abdullah al Murbati
- Born: 1965 (age 60–61); Manama, Bahrain
- Detained at: Guantanamo
- ISN: 52
- Charge: No charge (held in extrajudicial detention)
- Status: Repatriated

Issa Ali Abdullah al Murbati is a citizen of Bahrain who was held in extrajudicial detention in the United States Guantanamo Bay detainment camps, in Cuba. Al Murbati's Guantanamo Internment Serial Number was 52. American counter-terrorism analysts estimate he was born in 1965, in Manama, Bahrain.

== Detention in Kandahar ==
While held at Kandahar Airfield, al-Murbati and Moazzam Begg began playing chess on a board the International Red Cross had brought for the detainees.

Al Murbati participated in the hunger strikes of 2005.

== Allegations ==
The allegations against Al Murbati, from the Summary of Evidence memo, prepared for his Combatant Status Review Tribunal, were:

a The detainee is associated with Al Qaeda:
1. On November 2, 2001, detainee voluntarily traveled from Bahrain to Afghanistan.
2. The detainee traveled to Afghanistan via Pakistan where he planned to fight in the Jihad.
3. Detainee was a follower of Abu Sayyef; they met in the Philippines. They discussed getting money to Arabs in Afghanistan.
4. Abu Sayyef Group is a known terrorist organization.

b The detainee participated in military operations against the United States and its coalition partners.
1. Detainee was injured by a grenade while traveling to Khowst, Afghanistan, and given treatment at a hospital.
2. Detainee was told that if he went to war and fought the Jihad, he would be a better person and have his 15,000 Dinar debt forgiven, and eventually he traveled to Afghanistan.
3. Al Murbati discovered that there was not training available in Kandahar, and since he did not know how to use a Kalisnikov rifle, he traveled to Kabul by taxi, after learning there was training there.

== Habeas corpus submission ==
Al Murbati is one of the sixteen Guantanamo captives whose amalgamated habeas corpus submissions were heard by US District Court Judge Reggie B. Walton, on January 31, 2007.

Al Murbati has been represented by Joshua Colangelo-Bryan and Clive Stafford Smith. A campaign to free him is being led by Bahraini MP Mohammed Khalid.

== Release ==
Al Murbati was released during August 2007. He was the last Bahraini to be released. On Thursday, August 23, 2007, the Gulf Daily News reported that Bahraini Member of Parliament Mohammed Khalid had called for the Bahrain government to provide financial compensation to the released men.

== See also ==
- Solitary confinement
- Juma Mohammed Al Dossary
- Salah Abdul Rasool Al Blooshi
- Adel Kamel Hajee
- Shaikh Salman Ebrahim Mohamed Ali Al Khalifa
- Abdulla Majid Al Naimi
