= Salman Ebrahim Mohamed Ali Al Khalifa =

Guantanamo detainee

Salman Ebrahim
- Detained at: Guantanamo
- ISN: 246
- Charge: no charge extrajudicial detention
- Status: repatriated
- Occupation: Shaikh

Salman Ebrahim is a citizen of Bahrain who was held in extrajudicial detention in the United States Guantanamo Bay detention camps, in Cuba. The Department of Defense reports that Al Khalifa was born on July 24, 1979, in Rifah, Bahrain. He is a member of the Al Khalifa royal family of Bahrain, related to the king of Bahrain.

Al Khalifa is a second cousin of the King of Bahrain.

Al Khalifa, like the other Bahrainis held in Guantanamo, has Joshua Colangelo-Bryan as his lawyer.

== Official status reviews ==
Initially the Bush Presidency asserted that the Geneva Conventions did not apply to any captives apprehended in the "war on terror", and that these individuals could be held indefinitely without any open review of their status. However, in 2004, in Rasul v. Bush the United States Supreme Court ruled the captives had to be given an opportunity to hear the justifications for their detention, and an opportunity to try to refute those allegations.

=== Office for the Administrative Review of Detained Enemy Combatants ===
Following the Supreme Court's ruling in Rasul v. Bush, the Department of Defense set up the Office for the Administrative Review of Detained Enemy Combatants, which conducted annual reviews, which were, in theory, open to members of the press. Al Khalifa's status was reviewed in 2004 and 2005.

=== Formerly secret Joint Task Force Guantanamo assessment ===
On April 25, 2011, whistleblower organization WikiLeaks published formerly secret assessments drafted by Joint Task Force Guantanamo analysts. His assessment was five pages long, and was drafted on May 13, 2005. Camp commandant Jay W. Hood recommended his "transfer to the control of another country for continued detention."

== Release ==
The Gulf Daily News announced on November 5, 2005, that Salman had been released, and was one of three Bahraini detainees on their way home.

On Thursday August 23, 2007, the Gulf Daily News reported that Bahraini Member of Parliament Mohammed Khalid had called for the Bahrain government to provide financial compensation to the released men.

== See also ==
- Juma Mohammed Al Dossary
- Essa Al Murbati
- Salah Abdul Rasool Al Blooshi
- Adel Kamel Hajee
- Abdulla Majid Al Naimi
