= Jayforpur =

Jayforpur Moshahid hati
- Village
- Interactive map of Jayforpur
- Coordinates: 24.8421495°N 91.9592853°E
- Country: Bangladesh
- Division: Sylhet Division
- District: Sylhet district
- Upazila: Golapganj Upazila
- Time zone: UTC+6:00 (BST)

Jayforpur is a village in Bangladesh located in Fulbari Union of the Golapganj upazila in district Sylhet.

== Recognizability ==
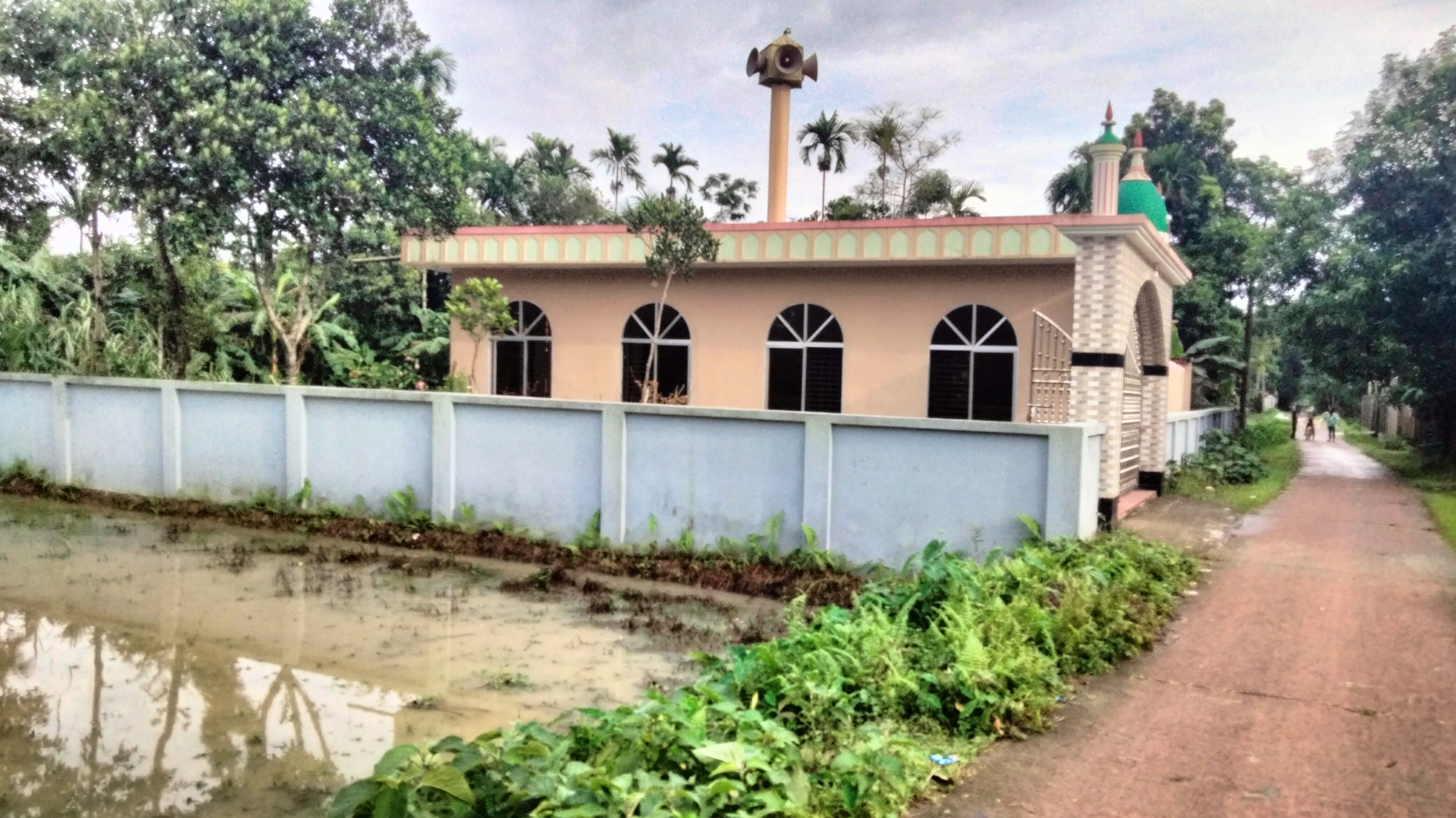
Jayforpur Jame Masjid
