= Mission XI Million =

Mission XI Million (MXIM)
- Full name: Mission XI Million
- Type: Football contact programme
- Location: India
- Affiliations: All India Football Federation, FIFA, Ministry of Youth Affairs and Sports, Government of India
- Activities: Football
- Website: www.mxim.in

Mission XI Million (MXIM) is an initiative designed, created, conceptualized and implemented by the Local Organising Committee of the FIFA U-17 World Cup India 2017, under the aegis of the AIFF (All India Football Federation) and supported by the Government of India. Mission XI Million is India’s largest school contact programme that aims to change the perception towards football at the school level in India by reaching out to school administrators, teachers, parents and kids; and explaining to them about how the sport can be played in their schools. The final objective of football becoming a sport of choice in India in the future. The ambitious program intended to engage 11 million school children in football as a lead-up to the FIFA U-17 World Cup India 2017.

== Official launch ==
MXIM was launched alongside the official mascot of the FIFA U-17 World Cup 2017 on 6 February 2017 by the Union Sports Minister Vijay Goel and the president of the All India Football Federation (AIFF) Praful Patel at the Jawaharlal Nehru Stadium.

The principal objective of Mission XI Million was to create a change of perception among the school communities in India that football can be played at any place, any surface and by any number of kids, contrary to the belief in a large number of areas of the country that only full sized pitch and 11vs11 matches can be football. The intention was to spread this message across the country and to bring gully football into the common knowledge of Indian schools, so that they can start playing football games within their existent infrastructure.

Mission XI Million uses the school network and facilities around the country to encourage children to play the game, gain healthy habits, fine motor skills and learn valuable life lessons in teamwork and sportsman spirit. The approach is to work with school principals, sports teachers and coaches together as one unit so that schools could become part of the programme by having their students engage in football activities. Schools were supported, directed and encouraged to make their children play football regularly within their existent facilities and for that basic football equipment (footballs and manuals) were given to each school.

== Stages of execution ==
=== Stage one ===
To comply with its objective, MXIM had three stage of engagements. The first one was called the seminar, the second one are the in-school activities to be carried out by schools themselves and the last one are the grand MXIM Festivals for kids

Seminars:

The first stage of MXIM was the reach out phase where school principals, physical education and sports teachers were invited to attend an MXIM designated seminar. The objective of the seminar was to change in all the administrators the perception of football as only an 11vs11 game that could only be played in massive fields. All administrators were encouraged to conduct football games within whatever existent infrastructure they had in their schools, making a big change in the mindset of a large number of schools that never thought that football could be played anywhere or by any number of kids. At the seminars, administrators were told more about the initiative, and exactly how to carry it out within their schools. Post the session, the registered schools, academies or institutions were handed over football equipment and a technical manual to refer while implementing the programme in their schools.

=== Stage two ===
The second stage of MXIM entailed in-school activities that were carried out within the institution by the own school teachers and administrators. There were recommendations given as to how carry out games in a small format and what type of drills they could be conducted, that were devised specially by the different stakeholders of MXIM for the programme considering the realities of India. The idea is that the format, devised especially for MXIM, can be adapted to different field conditions available locally. Coaches were required to conduct drills with the children, which have been described in detail in the manual provided. The in-school activities are to be carried ut by the own school administration, with the guidance, encouragement and support of the network of MXIM coordinators and coaches across the country.

=== Stage three ===
The third and final stage of the MXIM programme was the Football Festivals. Children from each school are selected to participate in a football festival in the particular city. Football matches, skill contests comprising dribbling, juggling and shooting are part of the grand football festival. Exclusive MXIM merchandise and other prizes were on offer for the students.

== Milestones ==
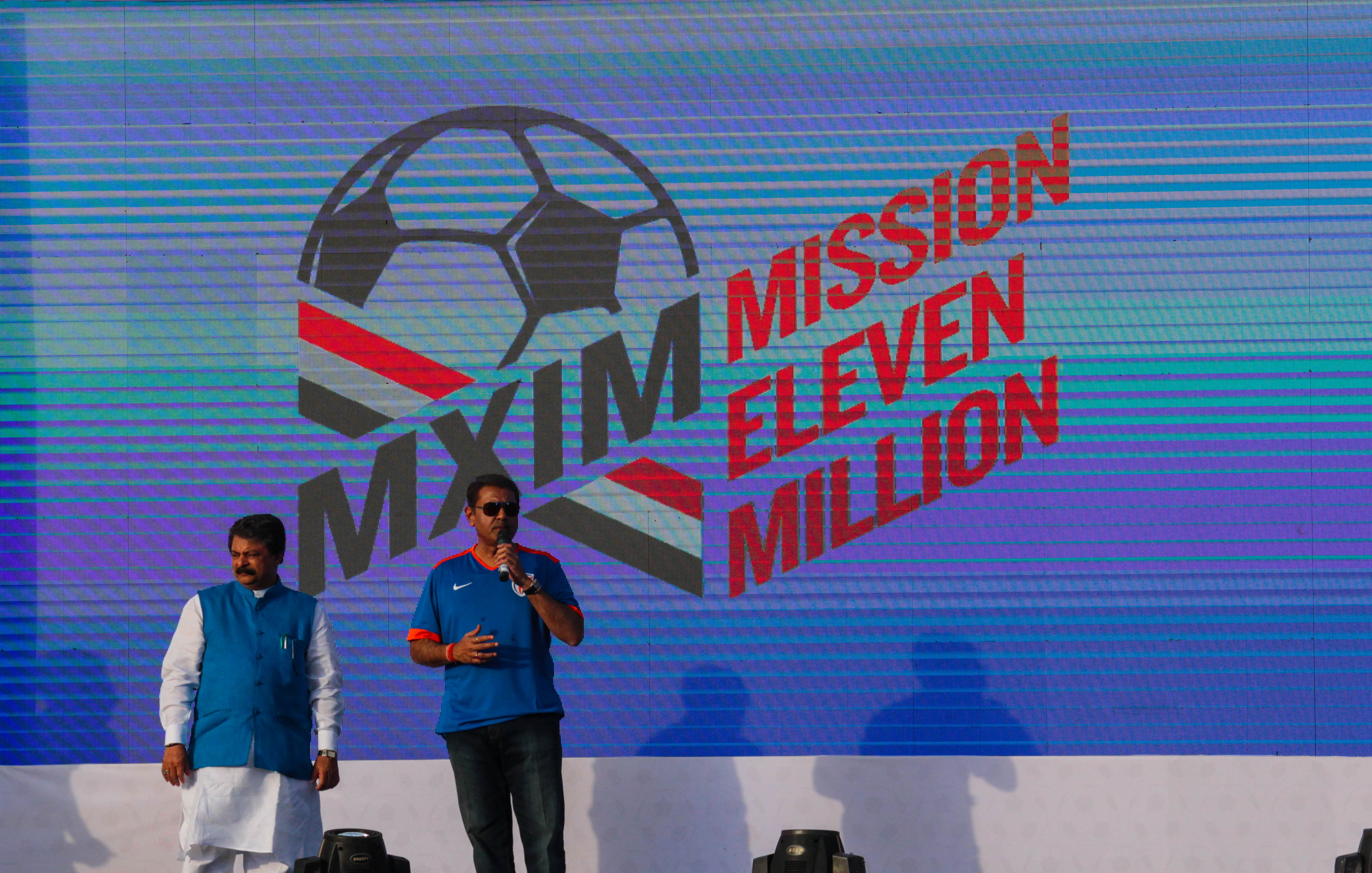
Praful Patel, President, AIFF at the Mission XI Million festival in Ahmedabad

MXIM touched the 2,000 schools mark within a month of its inception and Gangtok was the city where Mission XI Million found its landmark of reaching 1 million school students.

It also conducted its maiden football festival at the TransStadia Stadium in Ahmedabad on 9 April, which was attended by former Indian captain Bhaichung Bhutia, AIFF President Praful Patel and Bollywood actor Hrithik Roshan.

The programme has reached till date 11,008,561 million kids in all the 29 States and 2 Union Territories.

Over 42,200 footballs have been distributed till date to 24,933 schools in 78 cities across the country.

Before the India vs. USA match of the FIFA U-17 World Cup India 2017, at the Jawaharlal Nehru Stadium on 6 October 2017, Prime Minister of India, Narendra Modi, Sports Minister Rajavardhan Rathore, AFC President Sheikh Salman bin Ebrahim Al Khalifa, AIFF President Praful Patel and FIFA Secretary General Fatma Samoura felicitated the 11 kids who marks each millionth benchmark for the Mission Eleven Million Programme. The match ball used at the match was handed over by Narendra Modi to the 11th Millionth MXIM kid, who placed it on the match ball stand.

== Partnerships ==
Mission XI Million has been designed, conceptualized and it is run by the Local Organising Committee of the FIFA U-17 World Cup India 2017. The LOC partnered with Government of India for full support and outreach for MXIM.

Other main partners of MXIM included Adidas, Hero, Bank of Baroda and Sony Networks.
