= Uttar Badepasha =

Uttar Badepasha Union উত্তর বাদেপাশা ইউনিয়ন
- Union Council
- No. 10 Uttar Badepasha Union Council
- Location in Bangladesh
- Country: Bangladesh
- Division: Sylhet Division
- District: Sylhet District
- Upazila: Golapganj Upazila

Government
  - Union Chairman: Lecturer:Md.Jahid Hussain
- Demonym: Badepashi
- Time zone: UTC+6 (BST)
- Website: uttarbadepashaup.sylhet.gov.bd

Uttar Badepasha (Bengali: উত্তর বাদেপাশা, romanized: Uttor Badepasha, lit. 'North Badepasha') is a union council in Golapganj Upazila, Sylhet District, Bangladesh, located at 24.8583°N 92.0208°E.

== Demographics ==
As of the 1991 Bangladesh census, Golabganj has a population of 229,074. Males constitute 50.29% of the population, and females 49.71%. This eighteen Upazila's population is 110,364. Golapganj has an average literacy rate of 36.7% (7+ years), compared with the national average of 32.4% literate.

== Chairmen ==
List of Union chairmen
Number	Name	Term
01	Ghazanfar Ali	20/12/1971 - 24/2/1977
02	Lutfur Rahman	25/2/1977 - 20/2/1984
03	Nur Uddin	21/2/1984 - 30/6/1988
04	Shahab Uddin	1/7/1988 - 20/2/1993
05	Rafiq Uddin	21/2/1993 - 31/12/1997
06	Salih Ahmad	1/1/1998 - 18/3/2003
07	Muhibur Rahman	19/3/2003 - 11/12/2008
08	Abul Azad Hinu	12/12/2008 - 24/8/2011
09	Rehan Uddin Rayhan	25/8/2011 - 24/8/2016
10	Mostak Ahmed	25/8/2016 - 23/01/2022

== Villages ==
- Alampur
- Alampur Mandartala
- Amkona
- Anandapur
- Bade Pasha
- Bagla
- Chhalikona
- Chhoyghari
- Choarkandi
- Dakshin Alampur
- Debrai
- Furadabad
- Golapnagar
- Hajirkona
- Jamira
- Kalaim
- Keotkona
- Khagail
- Khash
- Konagaon
- Mirer Chak
- Mollar Chak
- Nohai
- Pitalkuri
- Satan Mardan
- Supatek
- Uttar Alampur

== See also ==
- Upazilas of Bangladesh
- Districts of Bangladesh
- Divisions of Bangladesh
