= Syed Makbul Hossain =

Bangladeshi politician (1946–2022)

Dr. Syed Makbul Hossain
- সৈয়দ মকবুল হোসেন (লেচু মিয়া)

Member of Parliament
- In office 2001–2006
- Preceded by: Nurul Islam Nahid
- Succeeded by: Nurul Islam Nahid
- Constituency: Sylhet-6
- In office 1986–1988
- Preceded by: Lutfur Rahman
- Succeeded by: AKM Gouach Uddin
- Constituency: Sylhet-6

Personal details
- Born: 1946 Sylhet, Assam Province, British Raj
- Died: 16 March 2022 (aged 75) Dhaka, Bangladesh
- Party: Independent
- Other political affiliations: Bangladesh Awami League; Bangladesh Nationalist Party
- Spouse: Sajeda Parveen
- Children: Syeda Adiba Hussain 1 Son
- Education: University of Calcutta; University of Dhaka
- Nickname: Lechu Mia

Syed Makbul Hossain (Bengali: সৈয়দ মকবুল হোসেন; 1946 – 16 March 2022), also known as Lechu Mia (Bengali: লেচু মিঞা), was a Bangladeshi politician and businessman. He was twice a member of parliament (1986 and 2001) and held the Sylhet-6 (Beanibazar-Golapganj) seat.

== Birth and early life ==
Syed Makbul Hossain was born in 1946 in the village of Sundisail in West Amura Union, Golapganj, Sylhet, British Raj. He obtained both his BA and MA in History from the University of Dhaka. He later obtained his PhD from the University of Calcutta. His wife was Sajeda Parveen. He had one son, Syed Tanvir Hossain, and one daughter, Syeda Adiba Hussain.

== Career ==
Syed Makbul Hossain actively participated in the war of liberation. He started his career as a government official after the independence of Bangladesh.

He served as the Deputy Commissioner of Tangail District. He resigned from the post of Deputy Secretary in 1975 and started his business. He was the Founder of Syed Makbul Hossain High School and Degree College in his birthplace Sundisail village. He was also the founder of many educational institutions.

=== Political life ===
Subsequently his careers in business and politics began. he joined the Awami League. After 1991, he joined the BNP. He participated in the elections of the national parliament three times. He was twice an independent member of parliament (1986 and 2001) in Sylhet-6 (Beanibazar-Golapganj) seat. He stood as an independent candidate for the seat in the 2008 election, but was defeated.

== Personal life ==
Syed Makbul Hossain died on 16 March 2022, at the age of 75.

== See also ==
- 1986 Bangladeshi general election
- 2001 Bangladeshi general election
