= AKM Gouach Uddin =

Bangladeshi politician (died 2019)

- এ.কে.এম গৌছ উদ্দিন

Sylhet-6 Jatiya Sangsad
- In office 1st
- Preceded by: Syed Makbul Hossain
- Succeeded by: Sharaf Uddin Khashru
- In office 1988–1991

Personal details
- Born: village of Chandrapur, Budh Bibazar Union, Golapganj Upazila, Sylhet district, Bangladesh
- Died: 11 May 2019 India
- Party: Jatiya Party

AKM Gouach Uddin was a politician in Sylhet District of Bangladesh. As a Jatiya Party candidate he was elected member of parliament for constituency Sylhet-6 in the 1988 Bangladeshi general election.

== Birth and early life ==
AKM Gausch Uddin was born in Chandarpur village of Budhbari bazar union in what is now Golapganj Upazila of Sylhet District.

== Political life ==
AKM Gouach Uddin was a former MP and an influential leader of the Jatiya Party. He was elected a member of the Jatiya Party from the Sylhet-6 (Golapganj-Beanibazar) seat in the fourth Jatiya Sangsad elections held on 7 March 1988.

=== Capital punishment ===
The court sentenced him to death for killing businessman Afroz Box while he was a member of parliament. The former MP went into hiding soon after the assassination. Until his death, he had run away for 29 years.

== Family life ==
His father, Tahir Ali, was a social worker. His daughter is the organizing secretary of Golapganj Upazila Social Trust and Jennifer Sarowar Laksmi, UK Women's Affairs Editor. The son-in-law, Abdul Rahim Shamim, is secretary of Relief and Rehabilitation, London Awami League.

== Death ==
AKM Gouach Uddin died on 11 May 2019 while undergoing treatment at a hospital in India. At the time of his death, he was 69 years old. He left behind his wife, one son, and three daughters.
