= Amkuna =

Coordinates: 24.7909°N 92.0640°E

Amkuna is a village in Uttar Bade Pasha Union under Golapganj Upazila of Sylhet District, Bangladesh.

According to the 2011 Bangladesh census, Amkuna had 436 households and a population of 3,117. Islam was the majority religion (99.6% of the population). 10.4% of the population was under the age of 5. The literacy rate (age 7 and over) was 62.2%, compared to the national average of 51.8%.
