= Al Sadeeq training camp =

Training camp in Afghanistan

Coordinates: 33.333°N 69.917°E

The Al-Sadeeq training camp is one of the training camps in Afghanistan, near Khost, that American intelligence officials have asserted were used to train individuals with ties to al Qaeda or the Taliban.

Salah Muhammad Salih Al Dhabi was accused of attending the Al-Sadeeq training camp, in the factors favoring continued detention, presented to his Administrative Review Board. Al Dhabi said he did not complete his training program, stating he attended the camp, for a week, in 1997.

Juma Mohammed Abdul Latif Al Dossary faced the allegation that he attended a camp called the al-Siddeek training camp in Khost.

Juma al Dosari's testimony before his first annual Administrative Review Board addressed this allegation. Al Dosari acknowledged attending the Siddeek camp. He testified he attended the camp in 1989 or 1990, when he was sixteen years old. He acknowledged that he received training on the Kalashnikov and exercise. He testified that he was sent by the Saudi government. He testified that:

As far as I knew, this training camp belonged to the Saudi Government.
