= Emran Ahmed Chowdhury =

Bangladeshi politician

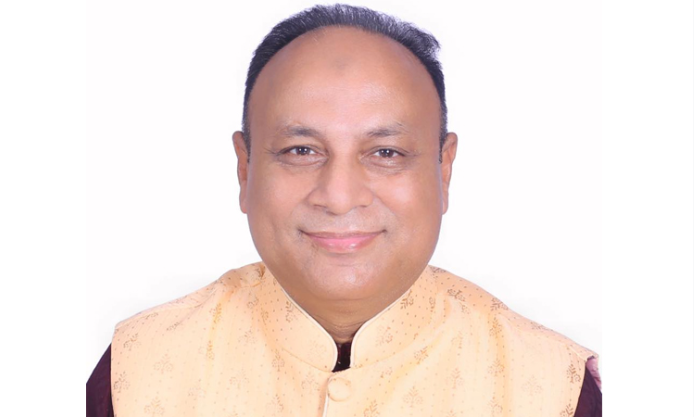
- Chowdhury in 2026

Member of Parliament
- Incumbent
- Assumed office 12 February 2026
- Preceded by: Husam Uddin Chowdhury
- Constituency: Sylhet-6

Personal details
- Born: 1 November 1967 (age 58) Golapganj, Sylhet, Bangladesh
- Party: Bangladesh Nationalist Party
- Spouse: Syeda Nurunnahar
- Children: 2 daughters
- Occupation: Lawyer and politician

Emran Ahmed Chowdhury is a Bangladeshi lawyer and politician. He is a Member of Parliament from the Sylhet-6 constituency.

== Early life ==
Emran Ahmed Chowdhury was born in Kotowalpur village of Hetimganj under Golapganj Upazila in Sylhet District. His father is Ziaur Rahman and his mother is Afia Khatun Chowdhury.

== Political career ==
Emran Ahmed Chowdhury previously served as the General Secretary of Sylhet District Chhatra Dal.

He later became the General Secretary of Sylhet District unit of the Bangladesh Nationalist Party.

He was elected for the first time as a Member of Parliament from Sylhet-6 constituency as a candidate of the Bangladesh Nationalist Party in the 2026 Bangladeshi general election.

== Personal life ==
Emran Ahmed Chowdhury is married to Syeda Nurunnahar. The couple has two daughters: Zainah Chowdhury and Ariba Binte Emran Chowdhury.
