= Syed Abdul Majid =

Bengali politician, lawyer, entrepreneur (1872–1922)

Khan Bahadur Syed Abdul Majid CIE
- সৈয়দ আব্দুল মজিদ
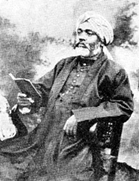
- Born: 1872; Kazi Elias, Sylhet (modern-day Bangladesh)
- Died: 29 July 1922 (aged 49–50); Shillong, Meghalaya, India
- Other name: Kaptan Miah
- Education: Nawab Taleb Bengal School, Sylhet District School
- Alma mater: Presidency College and St. Xavier's College
- Occupations: Politician, lawyer, moulvi, entrepreneur
- Organization(s): All India Tea and Trading Company
- Political party: Anjuman-e-Islamia
- Movement: All India Muhammadan Educational Conference
- Children: 2
- Relatives: Shah Mustafa (ancestor)
- Family: Syed family
- Awards: Khan Bahadur (1915), Companion of the Order of the Indian Empire (1922)

Khan Bahadur Syed Abdul Majid, CIE (Bengali: সৈয়দ আব্দুল মজিদ; 1872–1922), also known by his nickname Kaptan Miah (Bengali: কাপ্তান মিঞা), was a politician, lawyer and entrepreneur. He is notable for pioneering the development in the agricultural and tea industry in British India as well as his contributions to both secular and Islamic education in Sylhet.

== Early life ==
Abdul Majid was born in 1872 to a noble Bengali Muslim Syed family in the Kazi Elias neighbourhood in urban Sylhet. His father was Syed Abdul Jalil. His grandfather, Syed Muhibullah, was originally from Moulvibazar and a descendant of the 14th-century Muslim preacher Shah Mustafa. His mother, Hasb-un-Nisa, was the granddaughter of Moulvi Syed Qudratullah. This led to Abdul Majid being brought up in a traditional Islamic household in which he studied to become a moulvi. In addition to Bengali (both Standard and Sylheti), he was fluent in English and Urdu, and a moderate proficiency in Arabic.

Completing his primary education in Nawab Taleb Bengal School in Sylhet, his secondary education took place in Sylhet District High School where he passed his matriculation exams in 1887. He then moved to the city of Calcutta, where he studied at the Presidency College as well at St. Xavier's College. He obtained a BA (Hons) in 1892 and a BL (Hons) degree in 1894.

Abdul Majid kept a beard, as per Islamic custom. His dress sense was quite traditional, typically consisting of a pagri, achkan and pyjamas.

== Career ==
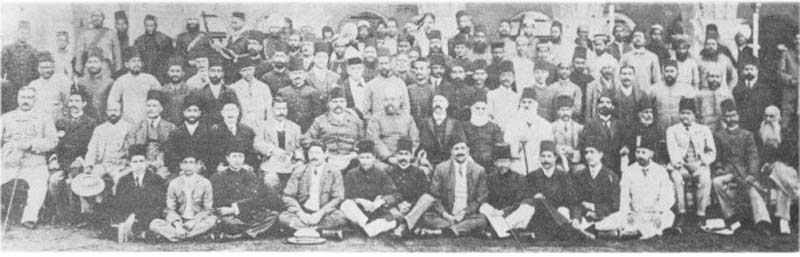
The All India Muhammadan Educational Conference, at Dhaka (1906)

Abdul Majid was a lawyer associated with the Sylhet District Bar Association for a few years after graduating before going into politics and agriculture. His main interests were in agriculture and as a Muslim, he joined the Anjuman-e-Islamia movement. This forum was the only Muslim political organisation which preceded the All-India Muslim League. He was made the secretary of its Sylhet unit in 1902 and later its president. In 1904, he opened the Brahmanchara Tea Estate alongside Muhammad Bakht Mazumdar, Karim Bakhsh and Ghulam Rabbani. He was also made Sylhet Pourashava's vice-chairman in 1906 and later chairman in 1909 for 3 years. As a District Session Judge based in Assam, he was invited by the Nawab of Dhaka, Khwaja Salimullah, to attend the 1906 All India Muhammadan Educational Conference in Shahbag, Dhaka. This conference was crucial to the development of the All-India Muslim League.

He was invited by the Indian Government to the opening ceremony of Pune City's agricultural research and college in 1908. Abdul Majid was the first ever native and Muslim Minister of Assam. On 2 February 1911, Abdul Majid pioneered the tea industry as a native by establishing the All India Tea and Trading Company. Consequently, he established three tea gardens in the Sylhet region. The authorised capital of the company was 1 lakh rupees, paid up capital was 7 lakh rupees, and subscribed capital was 8 lakh rupees. In addition to owning tea gardens, he also owned many agricultural farms and one oil mill which made him the first native to do so in Assam.

During the Delhi Durbar of 1911, Abdul Majid was honoured as an invited elite by Emperor George V and Mary of Teck to commemorate their coronation.

In 1912, he established the Muslim Institute Hall in Sylhet as a new headquarters for the Anjuman-e-Islamia, located south of Shah Jalal's dargah. It is now known as the Shaheed Suleman Hall and has been known as Jinnah Hall at one point.

In 1913, he also founded and developed the Sylhet Government Alia Madrasah at the old private Madrassah of the Anjuman-e-Islamia as part of his role as the Education Minister of Assam. He gave a speech and addressed the Muslim Fisherman's Society in Kanishail to start raising funds for a high-level madrasa project in Sylhet town. In response, wealthy Mahimal businessman managed to raise the money and hand it to him. With that money, several acres of land suitable for the construction of madrasa houses, including the present government Alia Madrasa ground, located southeast of the Dargah, were purchased and the necessary construction work was also completed. Abdul Majid was questioned by some people for the reason that he approached the Mahimal community (which is generally seen as a neglected lower-class Muslim social group). He responded by saying that he did to show that this community can do big things and that they should not be neglected.

In 1916, he upgraded Murari Chand College's status to first grade degree level and laid the school's foundation stone in Thackeray Hills alongside William Sinclair Marris in 1921.

In 1919, as president and chairman of Anjuman-e-Islamia's reception committee, he invited the Bengali Nobel laureate Rabindranath Tagore to Sylhet which attracted over 5000 people. It was in 1921, when he gained a seat into Assam's law council (MLA) representing Sylhet Sadar.

Abdul Majid was a prominent leader of the Sylhet-Bengal Reunion League founded in 1920, to mobilise public opinion demanding Sylhet and Cachar's incorporation into Bengal. However, during the Surma Valley Muslim Conference of September 1928, Abdul Majid and the Anjuman-e-Islamia later opposed the transfer of Sylhet and Cachar to Bengal and supported Muhammad Bakht Mazumdar's resolution.

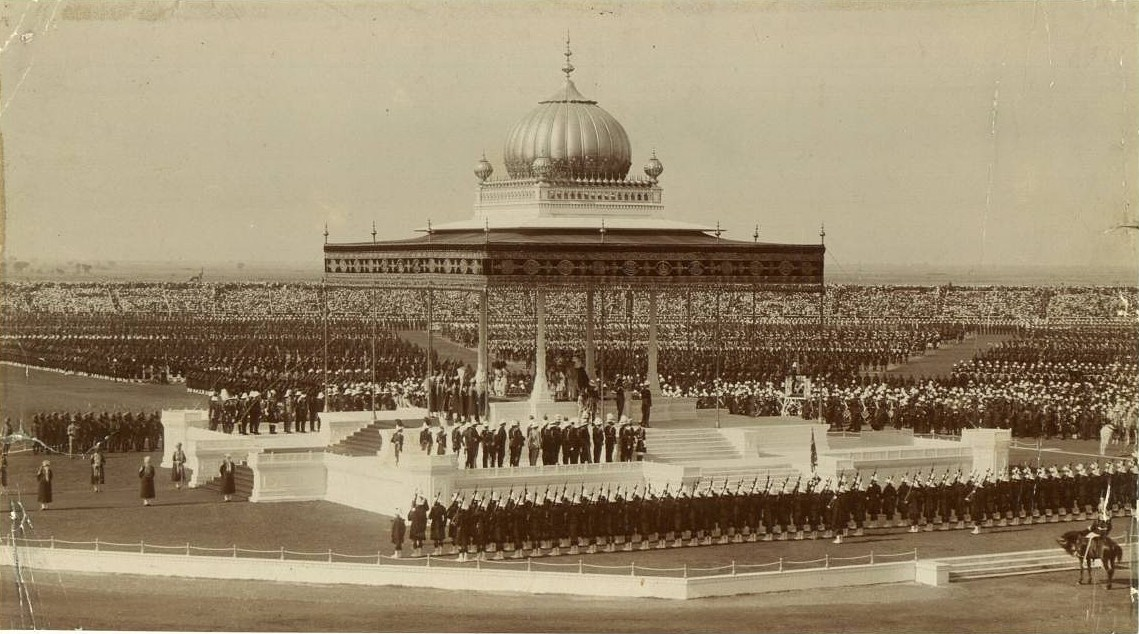
Syed Abdul Majid was honoured as an invited elite to King George V's Delhi Durbar in 1911.

== Awards ==
In 1915, the British Raj awarded him the title of Khan Bahadur as part of the 1915 Birthday Honours of King George V. He was subsequently awarded the chivalry of Companion of the Order of the Indian Empire as part of King George V's 1922 New Year Honours. This was during Abdul Majid's office as the Minister for Education for the Governor of Assam, William Sinclair Marris.

== Death ==
Abdul Majid died in Shillong at the age of 50. His daughter's son, Abu Saleh Chowdhury, wrote a biography on his life titled Forgotten Kaptan (Bengali: বিস্মৃত কাপ্তান, romanized: Bismrito Kaptan). Abdul Majid also had a son called Syed Maqsood.

== See also ==
- Tea production in Bangladesh
