= Nurul Islam Nahid =

Bangladeshi politician (born 1945)

- নুরুল ইসলাম নাহিদ
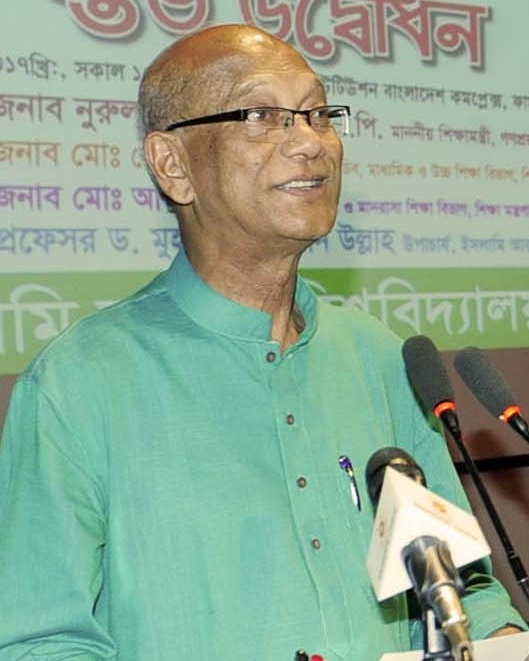
- Nahid in 2017

Minister of Education
- In office 6 January 2009 – 7 January 2019
- Prime Minister: Sheikh Hasina
- Preceded by: Hossain Zillur Rahman
- Succeeded by: Dipu Moni

Member of the Bangladesh Parliament for Sylhet-6
- In office 25 January 2009 – 6 August 2024
- Preceded by: Syed Makbul Hossain
- In office 14 July 1996 – 13 July 2001
- Preceded by: Sharaf Uddin Khashru
- Succeeded by: Syed Makbul Hossain
- Constituency: Sylhet-6

Personal details
- Born: 5 July 1945 (age 81) Karimganj, Assam Province, British India
- Party: Bangladesh Awami League (from 1994)
- Other political affiliations: Bangladesh Students' Union; Bangladesh Youth Union; Communist Party of Bangladesh (until 1994)
- Education: Murari Chand College; University of Dhaka

Nurul Islam Nahid (Bengali: নুরুল ইসলাম নাহিদ; born 5 July 1945) is a Bangladeshi politician, author and former leftist activist who served as Bangladesh's longest serving minister of education, from 2009 to 2019, under the premiership of Sheikh Hasina. He represented Sylhet-6 in the Jatiya Sangsad as a member of parliament (MP) from the Awami League (AL) from 1996 to 2001, and then again from 2009 to 2024. He was a key leader of the Bangladesh Students' Union throughout the Bangladesh Liberation War and the surrounding period, and subsequently led the Bangladesh Youth Union and the Communist Party of Bangladesh before joining the AL in 1994.

== Early life and education ==
Nurul Islam Nahid was born on 5 July 1945 to a Bengali Muslim family in the village of Kashba in Beanibazar, Sylhet District. His education began at the Kashba Primary School. He then enrolled at the Panchakhanda Hargovind High School, from which he matriculated in 1961.

His political career began whilst he was studying at the Murari Chand College in Sylhet and continued at the University of Dhaka. He was elected as the president of the Bangladesh Student Union in 1970, and was a founding president of Jubo Union in 1976.

== Career ==
During the time of the agitation against Ayub Khan, Nahid was active in the student movements against military rule in Pakistan and the mass upsurge of 1966. Nahid became general secretary of the Communist Party of Bangladesh in 1991. He joined the Awami League in 1994, becoming a member of the Bangladesh Parliament (1996–2001).

Nahid served as the vice-president of the 38th session of the UNESCO General Conference for the term of 2015 to 2017.

Nahid was arrested by Bangladesh Police on 18 November 2026.

== Bibliography ==
Nahid has also authored seven books and hundreds of articles:

- Bangali Rukhe Darao (2006)
- Bongobondhur Adorsho, Lokkho o Shongram (2007)
- Rajnitir Shusthodhara Punoruddharer Shongram (2009)
- Shikkhaniti o Onnanno Proshongo (2009)
- Bangladesher Obbhudoy o Gonotontrer Poth Porikroma (2006)

== Personal life ==
Nahid is married to Zohra Jasmine, a civil officer. They have two daughters. The elder daughter, Nadia Nandita Islam Tinni, is an assistant professor of linguistics at Dhaka University who married Gonojagoron Moncho spokesman Imran H Sarkar. Their younger daughter, Nazia Samantha Islam, works in the private sector.
