= Dhakadakshin Multilateral High School and College =

Dhakadakshin Multilateral High School and College (Dattarail)
- ঢাকাদক্ষিন বহুমুখী উচ্চ বিদ্যালয় ও কলেজ (দত্তরাইল)
- Dhakadakshin, Golapganj Upazila, Sylhet District; 3161; Bangladesh

Information
- Enrollment: 1100
- Website: ddkmlhsc.edu.bd

Dhakadakshin Multilateral High School and College (Bengali: ঢাকাদক্ষিন বহুমুখী উচ্চ বিদ্যালয় ও কলেজ), or DDK ML High School and College for short, is an educational institution of Golapganj Upazila under Sylhet District in the Division of Sylhet, Bangladesh.

== History ==
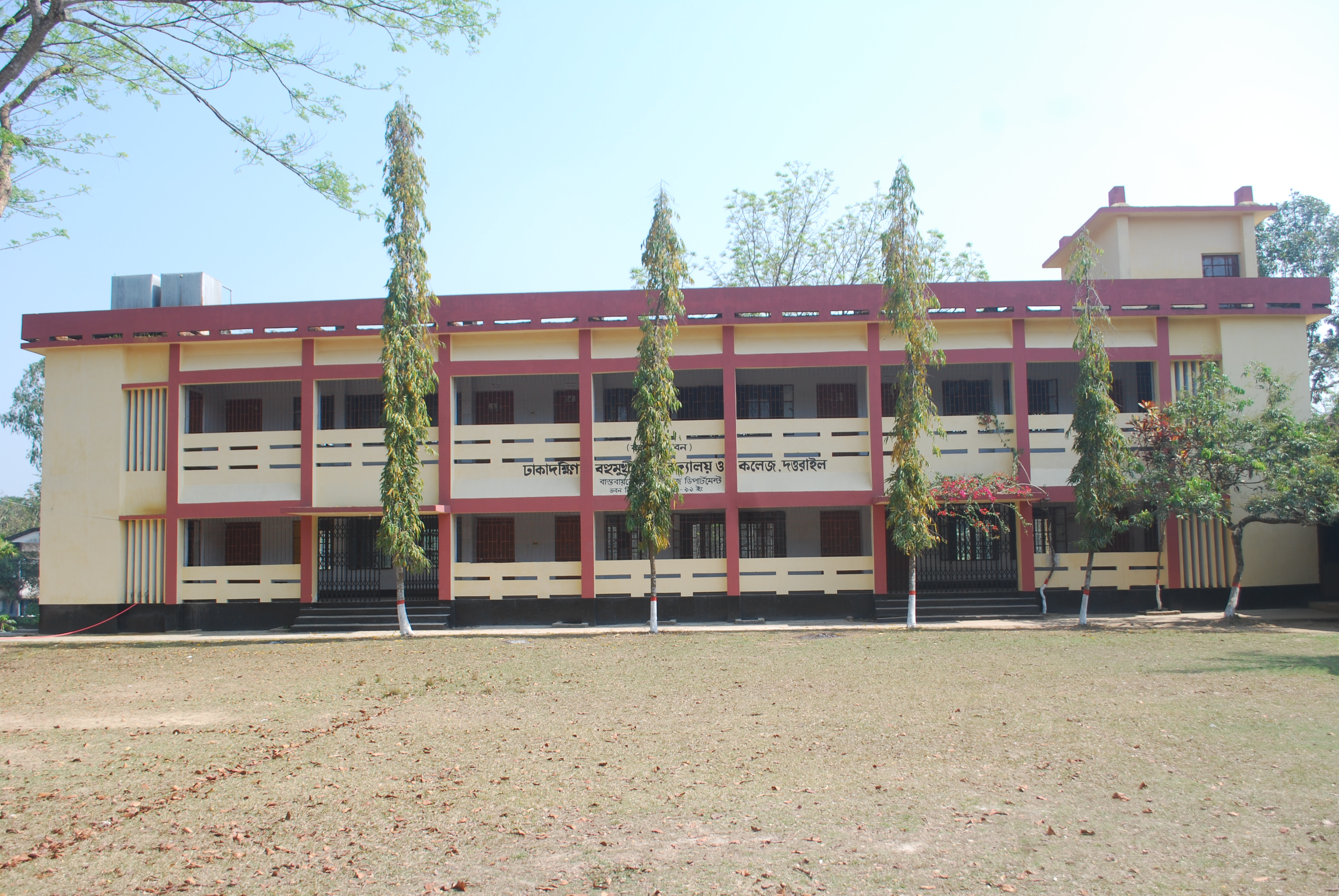
Dhakadakshin M.L High School

When the remote areas of British ruled India were lagging behind in education, initiatives were taken by some far thinking men of the region to set up schools. Although these were at first limited to district headquarters or townships, some initiatives were taken in the rural areas too, though this was rare. A Middle English School was established at Dhakadakshin pargana of Golapganj thana in 1898. Now, it stands a High School and College.

Records show people like Rai Bahadur Prokash Chandra Dev Chowdhury, Zaminder Kalikrishna Datta Chowdhury and Moulvi Bahauddin Chowdhury were the first ones to take this job upon themselves. It all started with Kalikrishna Datta Chowdhury donating the land for establishing the school on this beautiful location. The school did well in spreading the light of knowledge in the remote villages of North East Sylhet, a difficult job in the conservative society of 1899. The institution observed its centenary in 1998.

A meeting of the locals was held on 10 March 1938 and chaired by Nirod Nath Das. It was decided that Class VII would be started, as per a proposal by Mujahid Ali Chowdhury. Accordingly, the school authority petitioned to the education department for inaugurating classes VII and VIII. But, unfortunately the Deputy Inspector of Schools, North Sylhet declined the proposal on 11 December 1941.

Then the leading people of Dhakadakshin at a meeting on 18 March 1944, decided to convert the institution into a High English School on April the same year. Accordingly, a written application signed by a total of 98 leading personalities of the whole pargana was submitted to the Director of Public Instruction, Assam. Class VII was started in 1944 and class VIII from the year after. Permission was also granted to start Class IX in 1946 and Class X in 1947. On 12 March 1947, the Registrar of Calcutta University through a memo, gave approval as High English School for 2 years. The school became the first high school of the district in 1965 while Science and Agriculture Sciences groups were also opened in addition to the Humanities. The school was thus renamed as Dhakadakshin High School.

In 1995 the intermediate section was started in the Humanities and Science groups. Since then the institution has had a broader scope.

Students of the institution had proved their merit in different fields of extra curricular activities. They have won a number of prizes in the different district and divisional level competitions and tournaments. The Acting Principal of the institution- Rezaul Amin told The Daily Star, a congenial environment is there in the school and college. There are 30 teachers and about a thousand students. The campus stands on about 4 acres of land at a scenic beautiful place on the Sylhet-Dhakadakshin Road.

The school also owns a small market in Dhakadakshin Bazar and 2 other commercial structures, which house commercial bank branches.

From among the former students, a good number of enlightened citizens are now spread over the country and abroad on high positions.

The people, who were in the school managing committee at the very beginning are, Kalikrishna Datta Chowdhury, Moulvi Baha Uddin Chowdhury, Ananda Mohan Datta,-Deputy Inspector of Schools- Moulvi Aftab Ali Chowdhury, Moulvi Mosod Ali, Moulvi Shohir Uddin Chowhdury, Kali Romon Bhattacharya, and Indra Kumar Misra.

== Principals from the period starting 1971 ==
- Radhanath Chowdhury
- Kunja Bihari Raha
- Labonya Kumar Chakravarty
- Pulin Bihari Shil
- Ananda Charan Dev Majumder
- Srinibash Chandra Home Chowdhury
- Shailendra Nath Gupta
- Sanath Kumar Bhattacharya
- Khirode Chandra Das Purkayastha
- Latif Ahmed Chowdhury
- A H Fazlul Bari

Among them Khirode Chandra Das Purkayastha served the institution for 42 years including 35 years as head master till 1969.

== Academics ==
It is a secondary school serving from class 6 through class 12. It has three faculties: science, humanities and commerce.
