= Sharaf Uddin Khashru =

Bangladeshi politician (died 2026)

- শরফ উদ্দিন খসরু

Sylhet-6 Jatiya Sangsad
- In office 2nd
- In office 1991 – February 1996
- Preceded by: AKM Gouach Uddin
- Succeeded by: Sharaf Uddin Khashru
- In office February 1996 – June 1996
- Preceded by: Sharaf Uddin Khashru
- Succeeded by: Nurul Islam Nahid

Personal details
- Born: Sylhet, Bangladesh
- Died: 10 July 2026
- Party: Jatiya Party; Bangladesh Nationalist Party

Sharaf Uddin Khashru (died 10 July 2026) was a Bangladeshi politician from Sylhet District. He was elected a member of parliament from Sylhet-6 on the Jatiya Party ticket in the fifth Jatiya Sangsad elections held in the 1991 and in the sixth Jatiya Sangsad elections held on 15 February 1996, was elected a member of parliament from Sylhet-6 seat for the Bangladesh Nationalist Party.

== Life and career ==
Khashru was involved in Jatiya Party politics. The MP was elected from this party in 1991. He joined the Bangladesh Nationalist Party (BNP) in the 1994. He was elected a member of parliament in February 1996 for the BNP. After this the Progressive Democratic Party joined. He was defeated in the election of the 2008. After that he joined the Jatiya Party again.

Khashru died on 10 July 2026.

== See also ==
- 1991 Bangladeshi general election
- June 1996 Bangladeshi general election
