= Alaur Rahman =

Bangladeshi-born British singer (born 1961)

Alaur Rahman আলাউর রহমান
- Born: 1961 (age 64–65); Alagdi, Pailgaon, Jagannathpur, Sunamganj, East Pakistan (now Bangladesh)
- Origin: London, England
- Genres: Folk; Nasheed; ghazal; Hindi; Punjabi; Bengali; classical Hindi
- Occupation: Singer
- Instrument: Vocals
- Years active: 1985–present
- Labels: Jhankar Music; Serengeti Sirocco

Alaur Rahman (Bengali: আলাউর রহমান; born 1961) is a Bangladeshi-born British singer.

== Early life ==
Rahman was born in Alagdi, Jagannathpur, Sunamganj, Sylhet District, East Pakistan (now Bangladesh). He attended Madrasa, primary school and The Aided High School, where he would also sing hamd, na'at, qasida and other religious songs as well as songs dedicated to Bangladesh. In 1977, at the age of 14, Rahman came to the United Kingdom with his parents. He attended Pandit Horidas Ganguly School where he learned North Indian classical music.

== Career ==
In 1985, Rahman appeared on BBC programme Naya Zindagi, Naya Jeevan and sang ghazal and modern songs live. In the same year, Rahman recorded a 12-track debut album Smaranepare (Shoronay Poray). Rahman composed music for all 12-tracks, which were arranged by Qutbuddin and the lyrics were written by Abdul Mukit, Nurul Ghani, Delwar Khan and Shamsheer Qureshi. The album was produced and released by Jhankar Music. In 1986, he performed on Bangladesh Television (BTV).

In 1992, he performed on television programme about he Bangladeshi community of East London. In the 1990s, Rahman became one of the leading singers in Britain's Bengali community and went on to sell numerous songs. His musical influences are Mohammed Rafi, Mehdi Hassan, Ghulam Ali, Nurul Ghani and Talat Mahmood.

Rahman moved onto making spiritual and religious music and was selected by Ekushey Television to be the voice of the Adhan (call to prayer). Rahman has sung over 600 songs, which include Hindi and Bangla songs. His best of album Best of Alaur Rahman was released by Serengeti Sirocco. His songs are about the loss of a sense of belonging and the material conditions that underpin his life in Britain. Alaur Rahman has sung over 600 songs, which have been sung in many languages such as Hindi, Bengali, Urdu, Gujrati and more.

== Awards ==
Rahman has won numerous awards globally. These have included awards from Zee TV, Channel i, ATN, Bangla TV and Channel S, where he has won awards for being the best singer.

== Personal life ==
In 1986, Rahman married Rozina Rahman. They have two sons Rabi and Ra’id, and a daughter Aniqa.

== See also ==
- British Bangladeshi
- List of British Bangladeshis
- Music of Bengal
