= The Aided High School =

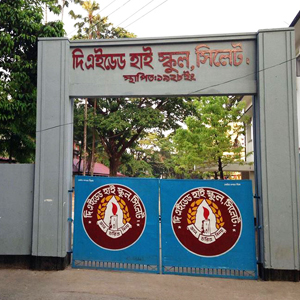
- Main gate
- Tanti Para, Zindabazar, Sylhet Sadar; Sylhet, 3100; Bangladesh

Information
- Type: Secondary school
- Established: 1928
- School district: Sylhet
- Grades: 6 to 10
- Gender: Male
- Website: www.theaidedhs.edu.bd

The Aided High School is one of the oldest secondary schools in the Sylhet region of Bangladesh, having been established in 1928. It was previously known as Nawab Taleb Bangla School. It is situated in the Zindabazar neighbourhood, in the center of Sylhet.

The headmaster is Md Shamsher Ali.

== Notable alumni ==
- Alaur Rahman - singer
- Abu Jayed - cricketer
- Alok Kapali - cricketer
- Syed Abdul Majid - lawyer, politician, entrepreneur, educationist
- Abdur Rahim (politician, born 1933)
- Rajin Saleh - cricketer
