= Mohammad Abdur Rahim =

Bangladeshi politician

Member of Bangladesh Parliament
- In office 1979–1986

Personal details
- Party: Bangladesh Nationalist Party

Mohammad Abdur Rahim (Bengali: মোহাম্মদ আবদুর রহিম) is a Bangladesh Nationalist Party politician and a former member of parliament for Pabna-12.

== Career ==
Rahim was elected to parliament from Pabna-12 as a Bangladesh Nationalist Party candidate in 1979.
