= Sylhet-6 =

Constituency of Bangladesh's Jatiya Sangsad

Coordinates: 24.85°N 92.02°E

- Constituency for the Jatiya Sangsad
- District: Sylhet District
- Division: Sylhet Division
- Electorate: 509,093 (2026)

Current constituency
- Created: 1973
- Party: Bangladesh Nationalist Party
- Member: Emran Ahmed Chowdhury
- ← 233 Sylhet-5 235 Moulvibazar-1 →

Sylhet-6 is a constituency represented in the Jatiya Sangsad (National Parliament) of Bangladesh since 2026 by Emran Ahmed Chowdhury of the Bangladesh Nationalist Party.

== Boundaries ==
The constituency encompasses Beanibazar and Golapganj upazilas.

== History ==
The constituency was created for the first general elections in newly independent Bangladesh, held in 1973.

== Members of Parliament ==
Election	Member	Party
1973	M. A. G. Osmani	Awami League
1975 by-election	Muhammad Ashraf Ali	Bangladesh Krishak Sramik Awami League
1979	Md. Enamul Haque Chowdhury	Awami League
Major Boundary Changes
1986	Syed Makbul Hossain	Independent
1988	AKM Gouach Uddin	Jatiya Party
1991	Sharaf Uddin Khashru	Jatiya Party
Feb 1996	Sharaf Uddin Khashru	Bangladesh Nationalist Party
Jun 1996	Nurul Islam Nahid	Awami League
2001	Syed Makbul Hossain	Independent
2008	Nurul Islam Nahid	Awami League
2014	Nurul Islam Nahid	Awami League
2018	Nurul Islam Nahid	Awami League
2024	Nurul Islam Nahid	Awami League
2026	Emran Ahmed Chowdhury	Bangladesh Nationalist Party

== Elections ==
=== Elections in the 2020s ===
General Election 2026: Sylhet-6 (Note: The vote counts given by The Business Standard are incomplete.)
Party	Candidate	Votes	%	±%
BNP	Emran Ahmed Chowdhury	109,917	46.2	N/A
Jamaat	Mohammad Selim Uddin	101,569	42.7	N/A
Independent	Md. Fakhrul Islam	23,846	10.0	N/A
GOP	Jahidur Rahman	1,386	0.6	N/A
JP(E)	Mohammad Abdun Noor	1,170	0.5	N/A
Majority		8,348	3.5	N/A
Turnout		237,888	46.7	N/A
Registered electors		509,093		
BNP gain from AL				

=== Elections in the 2010s ===
Nurul Islam Nahid was re-elected unopposed in the 2014 general election after opposition parties withdrew their candidacies in a boycott of the election.

=== Elections in the 2000s ===
General Election 2008: Sylhet-6
Party	Candidate	Votes	%	±%
AL	Nurul Islam Nahid	138,353	57.0	+18.9
Jamaat	Habibur Rahman	51,794	21.3	N/A
Independent	Syed Mokbul Hussain	48,974	20.2	N/A
JUI	Shamsuddin	3,121	1.3	N/A
PDP	Sorof Uddin Khosru	516	0.2	N/A
Majority		86,589	35.7	+32.0
Turnout		242,728	82.3	+13.7
AL gain from Independent				

General Election 2001: Sylhet-6
Party	Candidate	Votes	%	±%
Independent	Syed Makbul Hossain	76,513	40.7	N/A
AL	Nurul Islam Nahid	71,517	38.1	+2.6
IJOF	Kunu Mia	27,478	14.6	N/A
Independent	Md. Masud Khan	4,843	2.6	N/A
Independent	Abu Bakar	2,032	1.1	N/A
Gano Forum	Sheikh Akhtarul Islam	1,272	0.7	+0.3
Independent	Salah Uddin	1,245	0.7	N/A
Independent	Rafiqul Islam Khan	852	0.5	N/A
BNP	Abdul Hasib	607	0.3	−20.7
Jatiya Party (M)	M. Abdul Karim Akbari	550	0.3	N/A
JSD	Lokman Ahmed	501	0.3	−0.1
Jatiyo Janata Party (Nurul Islam)	Kazi Abdul Monim	289	0.2	0.0
Independent	Mostafa Allama	85	0.0	N/A
Majority		4,996	2.7	−10.0
Turnout		187,784	68.6	+0.7
Independent gain from AL				

=== Elections in the 1990s ===
General Election June 1996: Sylhet-6
Party	Candidate	Votes	%	±%
AL	Nurul Islam Nahid	53,965	35.5	N/A
JP(E)	Md. Muzammil Ali	34,691	22.8	−8.2
BNP	Syed Makbul Hossain	31,970	21.0	+12.7
Jamaat	Habibur Rahman	14,163	9.3	−2.8
IOJ	Mohammad Habibur Rahman	9,071	6.0	−10.2
Jamiat Ulema-e-Islam Bangladesh	Md. Nurul Islam	3,466	2.3	N/A
Sammilita Sangram Parishad	Sheikh Abdul Muzib	2,460	1.6	N/A
Gano Forum	Sheikh Akhtarul Islam	629	0.4	N/A
JSD	Waysur Rahman Chowdhury	578	0.4	−2.3
Bangladesh Muslim League (Jamir Ali)	Md. Habibur Rahman	439	0.3	N/A
Jatiya Janata Party (Nurul Islam)	Salah Uddin	303	0.2	N/A
Zaker Party	Sheikh Azharul Islam	200	0.1	N/A
Bangladesh Jatiyatabadi Awami League (Mostafa Allama)	Mostafa Allama	141	0.1	N/A
Majority		19,274	12.7	+8.1
Turnout		152,076	67.9	+19.6
AL gain from BNP				

General Election 1991: Sylhet-6
Party	Candidate	Votes	%	±%
JP(E)	Sharaf Uddin Khashru	39,065	31.0	
CPB	Nurul Islam Nahid	33,332	26.5	
IOJ	Mohammad Habibur Rahman	20,367	16.2	
Jamaat	Fazlur Rahman	15,267	12.1	
BNP	Nazrul Islam Mayur	10,407	8.3	
JSD	Lokman Ahmed	3,416	2.7	
Independent	Md. Wahidur Rahman	1,942	1.5	
Independent	Sahab Uddin	1,110	0.9	
Jatiya Samajtantrik Dal-JSD	Saidur Rahman Khan Mahbtab	526	0.4	
Independent	Rafiqul Islam	301	0.2	
JSD (S)	Ataur Rahman Khan	100	0.1	
Independent	Syed Makbul Hossain	75	0.1	
Majority		5,733	4.6	
Turnout		125,908	48.3	
JP(E) gain from				
