= Ramadan Abdel Rehim Mansour =

Egyptian street gang leader, serial killer and rapist

Ramadan Abdel Rehim Mansour رمضان عبدالرحيم منصور
- Born: c. 1980; Tanta, Gharbia, Egypt
- Died: December 16, 2010 (aged 30); Burj Al Arab Prison, Egypt
- Other name: Al-Tourbini (التوربيني)
- Occupation: Street gang leader
- Status: Executed by hanging
- Conviction: Murder (32 counts)
- Penalty: Death

Details
- Victims: 32+
- Span of crimes: 2004–2006
- Country: Egypt

Ramadan Abdel Rehim Mansour (Arabic: رمضان عبدالرحيم منصور; c. 1980 – December 16, 2010), also known as al-Tourbini (التوربيني; lit. 'express train'), was an Egyptian street gang leader and serial killer, who over the course of 7 years raped and murdered at least 32 children and youths, operating in several cities throughout Egypt including Alexandria, Beni Sueif, Cairo, and Qalyoubeya. All of his victims were aged 10 to 14 years, most of them boys. Mansour was arrested in 2006 (along with his six accomplices) and subsequently executed.

== Crimes ==
Mansour left his home in Tanta, a town north of Cairo, and joined a street gang at an early age. Gang leaders taught him skills of survival, allegedly cutting him with razors whenever he made a mistake. According to his confession, Mansour soon learned how to get back at those who crossed him: raping them, and murdering anyone who threatened to go to the police afterwards. One of Mansour's victims, a 12-year-old boy named Ahmed Nagui, had been a member of Mansour's gang. When Mansour tried to sexually assault him, Nagui reported him to the police; Mansour was arrested but shortly released for lack of evidence, after which, according to the prosecutors, Mansour raped and murdered Nagui in retaliation.

Mansour frequently traveled between Cairo and Alexandria by train. He felt safer in Alexandria because it had fewer police officers. The Vice Department of Borg El-Arab police station in Alexandria kept a file on him during this time. Mansour and his gang members lured street children onto the carriage roof of the trains, where they then stripped, raped and tortured them, and tossed them naked onto the trackside, dead or barely alive. Some of the children were dumped into the Nile, or buried alive. Mansour and his gang's crimes came to light in 2006 when two of his gang members were arrested, and Mansour acquired the nickname al-Tourbini, meaning "express train", from his favorite location for the crimes. After the arrest, Mansour reportedly told prosecutors that he was possessed by a female jinn who commanded him to commit the crimes. Mansour, along with his accomplice Farag Samir Mahmoud, also known as "Hanata", were convicted and sentenced to death by the criminal court in Tanta in 2007. Mansour and Mahmoud were both executed by hanging at Borg El-Arab Prison on Thursday, December 16, 2010.

Five other accomplices were also convicted in the case but spared execution, receiving instead prison sentences ranging 3 – 40 years.

== Commercialization of the name ==
Soon after the arrest, al-Ahram, a widely circulated Egyptian newspaper, reported that some products in Egypt were being named after Mansour's nickname, "al-Tourbini". Several restaurants in Mansour's hometown, Tanta, started selling a so-called "al-Tourbini sandwich", allegedly in demand by young locals. Sheep merchants gave the name "al-Tourbini" to the large-size lamb priced at more than E£2,000 (equivalent to about US$350 at the time and $560 currently). Some tuk-tuk drivers named their vehicles "al-Tourbini" to attract customers. According to al-Ahram, the "strangest such marketing ploy" was that of owners of supermarkets and communications centers in Tanta renaming their businesses "al-Tourbini: The Butcher of Gharbia". Author and journalist John R. Bradley commented in his book Inside Egypt: The Land of the Pharaohs on the Brink of a Revolution that "this reaction borders on the incomprehensible, but what it clearly indicates is that something has gone terribly wrong" with contemporary Egyptian society.

== See also ==
- List of serial killers by country
- List of serial killers by number of victims
