= Abdur Rahim (cricketer) =

Bangladeshi cricketer (born 1974)

Personal information
- Born: 12 December 1974 (age 51); Rajshahi
- Source: CricketArchive, 5 December 2022

Mohammed Abdur Rahim (born 12 December 1974) is a Bangladeshi cricketer, born in Rajshahi. He is also known by the nickname of Hira. Abdur Rahim has never played first-class cricket, and his single appearance at List A level came in the 2000–01 season, when he appeared for Rajshahi Division against Biman Bangladesh Airlines at Savar. He was dismissed for a second-ball duck.
