= Abdul Rahim (Indian politician) =

Indian politician

Abdul Rahim (7 June 1902 – 14 November 1977) was an Indian politician of the Indian National Congress. He served as a member of the Rajya Sabha from 3 April 1958, to 2 April 1962.

He was born in Madras, to Kazi Abdul Karim. He joined the Indian National Congress and served as a member of the Rajya Sabha from 1958 to 1962. He was also a prolific writer and had authored four books in Tamil.

== Family ==
Abdul Rahim married Bibijan. The couple had one son and two daughters.
