= Khalid Abdul Rahim =

Bahraini business magnate

- خالد محمد عبد الرحيم
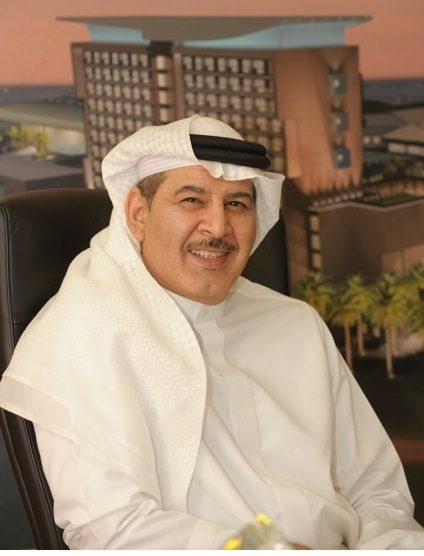
- Born: 7 January 1962 (age 64)
- Education: Glasgow Caledonian University; St. Edward's University
- Occupations: Chairman of: KAR Group; Cebarco Bahrain

Khalid Mohammed Abdulrahim (Arabic: خالد محمد عبد الرحيم; born 1962) is a Bahraini business magnate and construction tycoon is the founder and chairman of KAR group of companies. The focal point of this business group is Cebarco Bahrain, a building construction and civil engineering company. Projects completed by the company include Bahrain International Circuit, Yas Marina Circuit, Bahrain City Centre, the Sheikh Isa bin Salman Library and Conference Centre, Citibank Headquarters, King Hamad Highway and Bahrain Chamber of Commerce.

== Biography ==
Khalid Abdulrahim was born in Manama in 1962. In 1979, he went to the US to attend St. Edward's University in Austin at Texas. After obtaining his degree Abdulrahim joined his family business in 1986, and not long after he started his own civil engineering company named "Cebarco Bahrain SPC."

Khalid's completed further studies at Glasgow Caledonian University while engaged in construction projects in Bahrain; the Formula 1 Grand Prix circuit which had to be completed in 16 months. It was completed on time.

== Achievements ==
Khalid Abdulrahim was awarded an Honorary Degree of Doctor of Engineering by Glasgow Caledonian University.

In 2008, Khalid Rahim was nominated among the finalists for the Middle East Entrepreneur of the year award. In 2010 Khalid Rahim was invited to the House of Lords in the UK by Lord Gus McDonald to congratulate Rahim on the award of the Alumni Achievers award from Glasgow Caledonian University where he also acts as Chancellor. Khalid Rahim jointly received the 'International Achievement Award' at Industry Excellence Awards Ceremony (MCIEA)2004, held in Kuala Lumpur, along with Chua Siow Leng of WCT Engineering Berhad for the successful completion of the Bahrain International Circuit ahead of the time schedule.
