= Abdul Raheem Quraishi =

Indian Islamic scholar

Maulana Abdul Raheem Quraishi

Personal life
- Born: Hyderabad, India

Religious life
- Religion: Islam

Abdul Raheem Quraishi (died 14 January 2016) was an Indian Islamic scholar who served as the President of Majlis-e-Tameer-e-Millat, a socio-religious organisation based in Telangana and Andhra Pradesh, founded by Syed Khaleelullah Hussaini in the 1950s. He also served as an assistant general secretary and spokesman of the All India Muslim Personal Law Board. He held the position of president at the Muslim United Forum, president of the United Action Committee, and served as a Central Council member of the All India Milli Council.

== Career ==
Abdul Raheem Quraishi resigned from government service to dedicate himself to community work. Additionally, he wrote a book titled Facts of Ayodhya Episode.

== Death ==
He died on 14 January 2016, and he was laid to rest at his ancestral graveyard under Gowliguda Nizam Shahi graveyard, with the Namaz-e-Janaza offered at the Makkah Masjid. His death was condoled by K Chandrasekhar Rao, Asaduddin Owaisi and others.
