= Abdurrahim Al Murbati =

- Known for: Brother of a former Guantanamo captive; has been held without charge by Saudi Arabia since 2003

Abdurrahim Al Murbati is a citizen of Bahrain who has been held in extrajudicial detention in Saudi Arabia since June 2003. The Gulf Daily News reported on July 7, 2008 that Al Murbati had been held in Haer prison south of the Saudi capital Riyadh. His son Osama had been allowed regular visits to him, until recently, when he was told his father had been moved. Saudi authorities had withheld Al Murbati's current location.

Abdurrahim Al Murbati is the brother of former Guantanamo captive Issa Al Murbati.

On September 21, 2008 the Bahrain Human Rights Watch Society launched another appeal for the release of Al Murbati and Khalil Janahi. The Gulf Daily News reported that the two men had recently been transferred to a prison in Dammam, in eastern Saudi Arabia, nearer to Bahrain.
