= Abdulla Majid Al Naimi =

Guantanamo detainee

Abdulla Majid Al Noaimi
- Born: March 9, 1982 (age 44); Manama, Bahrain
- Arrested: November 2001; Pakistan; Pakistani authorities
- Released: 5 November 2005; Bahrain
- Detained at: Guantanamo
- Other names: Abdullah al Noaimi; Abdullah Majed Sayyah Hasan Alnoaimi
- ISN: 159
- Charge: No charge (held in extrajudicial detention)
- Status: Repatriated, then arrested, and held without charge on a visit to Saudi Arabia in 2008.

Abdulla Majid Al Naimi (also transliterated as Abdullah al Noaimi; born March 9, 1982, in Manama, Bahrain) is a Bahraini, formerly held in extrajudicial detention in the United States Guantanamo Bay detention camps, in Cuba.

== Arrest ==
Al Naimi has stated that he was abducted by Pashtun tribesmen in Afghanistan in late 2001, and then handed over to the Pakistani authorities in return for a cash reward. After being moved around for a while he eventually arrived at a prison at Kohat. After several more weeks he was transferred to American custody and flown to Guantanamo Bay.

== Inconsistent identification ==
Abdulla Majid Al Naimi was identified inconsistently on official Department of Defense documents:

- He was identified as Abdullah al Noaimi on the official list of captives' names published on May 15, 2006.
- He was identified as Abdullah Majed Sayyah Hasan Alnoaimi on the official list of captives whose habeas corpus petitions should be dismissed following their transfer from US custody.

Press reports transliterate his name as "Abdullah Al Nuaimi".

== Combatant Status Review ==
Initially the Bush administration asserted they could withhold the protections of the Geneva Conventions from captives in the war on terror, while critics argued the Conventions obliged the United States to conduct competent tribunals to determine the status of prisoners. Subsequently the Department of Defense instituted Combatant Status Review Tribunals, to determine whether the captives met the new definition of an "enemy combatant".

Detainees do not have the right to a lawyer before the CSRTs or to access the evidence against them. The CSRTs are not bound by the rules of evidence that would apply in court, and the government’s evidence is presumed to be “genuine and accurate.” However, unclassified summaries of relevant evidence may be provided to the detainee and each detainee has an opportunity to present “reasonably available” evidence and witnesses.

From July 2004 through March 2005, a CSRT was convened to make a determination whether each captive had been correctly classified as an "enemy combatant". Abdulla Majid Al Noaimi was among the one-third of prisoners for whom there was no indication they chose to participate in their tribunals.

In the landmark case Boumediene v. Bush, the U.S. Supreme Court found that CSRTs are not an adequate substitute for the constitutional right to challenge one's detention in court, in part because they do not have the power to order detainees released. The Court also found that "there is considerable risk of error in the tribunal’s findings of fact."

A Summary of Evidence memo was prepared for the tribunal, listing the alleged facts that led to his detainment. His memo accused him of the following:

a. The detainee is a Taliban fighter:

1. The detainee is a Bahrain citizen who admitted he traveled from Bahrain through Meshad [sic], Iran to Afghanistan on September 13, 2001.
2. Detainee traveled to Afghanistan to fight for the Taliban and die in Jihad.
3. Detainee knew he would be fighting the Northern Alliance and the United States.
4. Upon arriving in Afghanistan detainee requested and received directions from a Taliban representative to an office/guesthouse in Kabul, Afghanistan.
5. At the Taliban office, the detainee introduced himself and told the Taliban representative that he had come to fight.
6. After November 2001 the detainee, along with four other Arabs and two Afghanis, were guided to the Pakistani border where he was arrested by Pakistan border guards, taken to jail, and later turned over to United States forces in Kandahar, Afghanistan.

— Summary of Evidence for Combatant Status Review Tribunal

=== Witness statements ===
The documents the Department of Defense released include two statements, both dated November 11, 2004.

One statement was from Mohammed Salman Al-Khalifa, a cousin of Salman Al Khalifa, a member of the Bahrain royal family. It states since Abdullah Al Noaimi was a childhood friend of Salman Al Khalifa he was asked to travel to Pakistan and Afghanistan to look for him, when he went missing, in August 2001.

The other statement is from Mohamad Suleiman Alkaleifa, a childhood friend who testified to his good character, and lack of interest in politics.

If his Board considered these witness statements then it was redacted from their recommendations.

== Abdullah Al Noaimi v. George Walker Bush ==
A writ of habeas corpus was submitted on Abdullah Al Noaimi's behalf. The Department of Defense released a dossier of 24 pages of documents arising from his CSR Tribunal on December 9, 2004.

=== Administrative Review Board ===
Detainees whose Combatant Status Review Tribunal labeled them "enemy combatants" were scheduled for annual Administrative Review Board hearings. These hearings were designed to assess the threat a detainee might pose if released or transferred, and whether there were other factors that warranted his continued detention.

=== Summary of Evidence memo ===
A Summary of Evidence memo was prepared for Abdullah Al Noaimi's Administrative Review Board, on July 1, 2005. The memo listed factors for and against his continued detention.

There is no record that Al Noaimi participated in his Board hearing.

=== Board recommendations ===
In early September 2007, the Department of Defense released two heavily redacted memos, from his Board, to Gordon J. England, the Designated Civilian Official. The Board's recommendation was unanimous. The Board's recommendation was redacted. England authorized his transfer on October 4, 2005.

== Release ==
Represented by attorney Joshua Colangelo-Bryan, Al-Naimi was one of three Bahraini detainees released and sent back to Bahrain in November 2005.

Bahraini Member of Parliament Mohammed Khalid had called for the Bahrain government to provide financial compensation to the released men.

== Comments on the June 10, 2006 suicides ==
The deaths of three detainees were announced on June 10, 2006. Al Naimi knew the three men, and commented on their deaths on June 25, 2006. Al Naimi said that Mani Al-Utaybi and Ali Abdullah Ahmed were captured while studying in Pakistan. He said that they were interrogated for only a brief time after their arrival in Guantanamo, and their interrogators had told them they were not regarded as a threat, and that they could expect to be released.

The interrogations dealt with them only during the first month of their detention. For more than a year before I left Guantanamo in November 2005, they were left alone. But they were still held in bad conditions in the camp by the guards.

Al Naimi also said that the third dead man, Yasser Talal Al Zahrani, was only 16 when he was captured, and should have been treated as a minor.

He was 21 when he died, barely the legal age in most countries, and was merely 16 when he was picked up four and half years ago. His age shows that he is not even supposed to be taken to a police office; he should have been turned over to the underage [juvenile] authorities.

== Saudi arrest ==
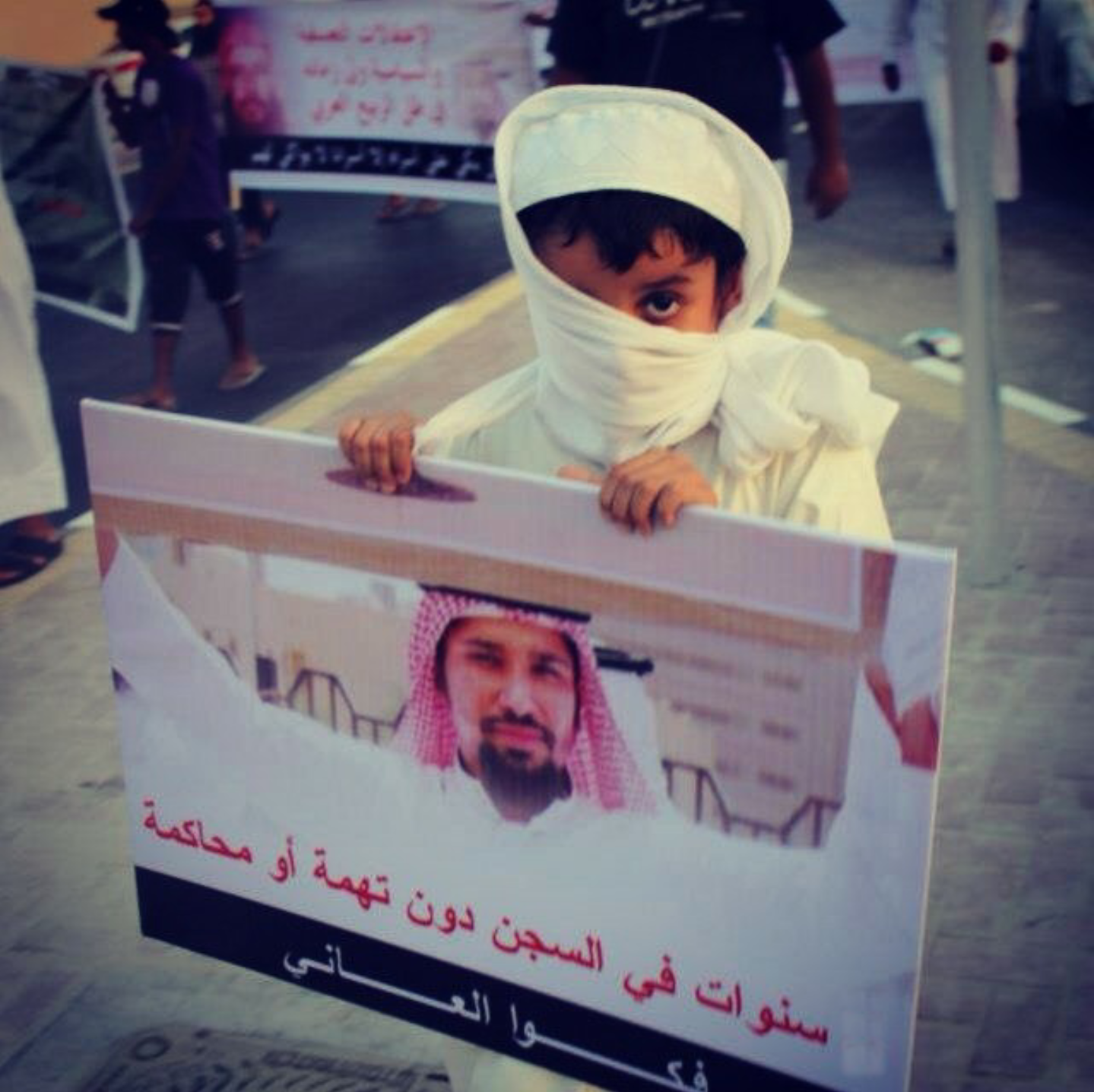
Picture of Abdulla Majed Al Noaimi held by a protesting child in 2012.

The Gulf Daily News reported that Al Naimi had been arrested in Saudi Arabia in late October 2008. Bahraini Member of Parliament Mohammed Khalid expressed dismay at the arrest of a third Bahraini citizen by Saudi authorities, and said that the Saudis had not offered a formal justification for his arrest.

In late November 2008, another Bahraini in extrajudicial detention in Saudi Arabia, Khalil Janahi, was reported to have been repatriated. Mohammed Janahi described Khalid Janahi's repatriation as a hopeful development for Al Naimi, and two other Bahrainis in extrajudicial detention in Saudi Arabia - Abdulraheem Al Murbati, and Hassan Al Yabis. Al Naimi and the other men remained held by Saudi Arabia in April 2009.

Al Noaimi was eventually released by the Saudis without charge and returned to Bahrain on April 21, 2016.

== Pentagon claim he had "returned to the fight" ==
A 2009 article in the New York Times claimed that a Pentagon report "confirmed" that Al Noaimi had "returned to the fight" and had engaged in terrorist activity after his release from Guantanamo Bay in 2005. They later critiqued their own handling of the information.
