= Juma al-Dossary =

Bahraini citizen

Jumah Mohammed Abdul Latif Al Dossari
- Detained at: Guantanamo
- ISN: 261
- Status: Repatriated

Jumah Mohammed Abdul Latif Al Dossari (Arabic: جمعه محمد عبد اللطيف الدوسري) is a Bahraini citizen who was held for five years at Camp Delta, at the US Naval base at Guantanamo Bay. He spent 3 1/2 years in solitary confinement. He was released to Saudi Arabia in 2007 with no charges against him. During the 1990s, he fought in Bosnia and Chechnya.

== Background ==
In late July 2005, Al-Dossari spoke with his lawyer Joshua Colangelo-Bryan about the summer's first hunger strike. The prisoners ended this strike on July 28, 2005, when guard commander Michael Bumgarner promised concessions.

Speaking in Bahrain in September 2005, following the meeting with his client, Colangelo-Bryan revealed that Al-Dossari had informed him that:

- the detainees were willing to die, if necessary, to resolve their grievances.
- the detainees were protesting their imprisonment without having fair hearings.
- the detainees were protesting interference with their religious practices, including interruption of the call to prayer by prison officers who talked loudly during the call and even mimicked it.
- the detainees were served food which was often rotten and tap water which was yellow and brackish.
- the number of detainees being given acute medical attention had overwhelmed the camp's infirmary, and critically ill detainees were in cots in the interrogation area.

Colangelo-Bryan believed that Al-Dossari joined in the summer's second hunger strike, which started approximately August 8, 2005.

Chicago Public Radio's program, This American Life, featured Al-Dossari in a Peabody Award-winning broadcast about Guantanamo in 2006.

== Letters from Al-Dossari, and his father ==
On September 5, 2005, the Gulf Daily News summarized a letter Al-Dossari had written, protesting his innocence. The letter was post-marked June 10, 2005, and described various abuses he had suffered, including:

- cigarettes being extinguished on his body.
- being made to walk on barbed wire.
- being urinated on by GIs.

On September 17, 2005, the Gulf Daily News summarized a letter received from the father of Al-Dossari, saying that he had throat cancer, expects to die soon and pleads to see his son.

== Released British detainees reports ==
British detainees Tarek Dergoul and Shafiq Rasul were released in 2004. They reported that their cells were near that of Al-Dossari. According to Human Rights Watch:

Rasul also recounted the beating of Bahraini prisoner Jummah Al-Dousari, who was mentally ill and used to shout all the time, say silly things, impersonate the soldiers. One day, he impersonated a female soldier. The upshot was that an Initial Reaction Force (IRF) team was called.

The Newstandard reports:

When Jumah saw them coming he realized something was wrong and was lying on the floor with his head in his hands. If you're on the floor with your hands on your head, then you would hope that all they would do would be to come in and put the chains on you. That is what they're supposed to do.

The first man is meant to go in with a shield. On this occasion the man with the shield threw the shield away, took his helmet off, when the door was unlocked ran in and did a knee drop onto Jumah's back just between his shoulder blades with his full weight. He must have been about 240 pounds in weight. His name was Smith. He was a sergeant E5. Once he had done that the others came in and were punching and kicking Jumah...

Jumah had had an operation and had metal rods in his stomach clamped together in the operation... [Smith] grabbed his head with one hand and with the other hand punched him repeatedly in the face. His nose was broken. He pushed his face and he smashed it into the concrete floor. All of this should be on video. There was blood everywhere. When they took him out they hosed the cell down and the water ran red with blood. We all saw it.

== Suicide attempts ==
The Gulf Daily News reported on October 20, 2005, that there were signs that the mental health of Al-Dossary was deteriorating. The story was based on notes from Colangelo-Bryan, which US intelligence officials had declassified on October 19, 2005. According to Colangelo-Byran:

- Al Dossary had made earlier suicide attempts.
- Al Dossary said he was afraid he was losing his mind.
- Al Dossary reported that the lights were never turned off in his cell, and this interfered with his ability to sleep.
- Al Dossary reported that he knew he needed mental health care, but he didn't trust the camp medical staff.
- Al Dossary reports he has been suffering from seizures.
- Al Dossary reports that camp medical staff have withheld medical treatment from him in the past.
- Al Dossary reports that when he can fall asleep he awakes screaming, from nightmares.

According to a report in the Washington Post on November 1, 2005, Al Dossary attempted to commit suicide on October 15, whilst taking a washroom break during a visit by his lawyer, Joshua Colangelo-Bryan. Colangelo-Bryan described finding Al Dossary hanging unconscious from a noose in the washroom, with blood pouring from a large wound in his right arm. American authorities decline to comment on specific detainee's cases, but they have acknowledged that 22 detainees have made 36 suicide attempts.

Following his most recent suicide attempt Al Dossary's lawyers filed a temporary restraining order and preliminary injunction on his behalf.

In the restraining order they requested:

- Reading material beyond a copy of the Qu'ran.
- Turning off the lights in his cell, to help make it possible for him to sleep.
- Biweekly telephone calls to his family and lawyers.
- Being allowed increased exercise time.
- Being allowed to receive mail from his family.

His lawyers requested that an independent medical professional be permitted to assess Al Dossary's mental state. They described the Americans' refusal to provide news of Al Dossary's health, following his recent suicide attempt, as "gratuitous callousness".

Al Dossary was reported to have had made another suicide attempt, on November 13, 2005, by ripping out his stitches. The Kansas City Star said that this was Al Dossary's ninth suicide attempt.

The Star quotes Colonel Michael Bumgarner, the camp guard commander, who wrote in an affidavit that Al Dossary's despair was his own fault, because Al Dossary had not claimed 73 of his last 97 exercise privileges. His interrogators had occasionally rewarded him with take out pizza, hamburgers, and had let him watch the movies Gladiator and Troy.

On May 11, 2006 the Gulf Daily News reported that Colangelo-Bryan said that al Dossary had tried to slit his throat in March.

== Alleged to have been tied to the "Lackawanna Six" ==
An article published on November 7, 2005, quotes Peter J. Ahearn, the special agent in charge of the FBI's Buffalo office concerning interest the FBI had in ties between Al Dossary, and the Lackawanna Six. Six Yemeni-Americans from Lackawanna, near Buffalo, secretly traveled to Pakistan and Afghanistan, for jihad training, in early 2001. Ahearn told the Buffalo News that two of the Lackawanna Six said that Al Dossary had delivered a "fiery speech" at the Guidance Mosque in Lackawanna. According to Ahearn the FBI is interested in learning whether Al Dossary may have helped fund the Lackawanna men's travel expenses.

The Buffalo News article quotes from Al Dossary's Combatant Status Review Tribunal. They report that Al Dossary acknowledges traveling to Buffalo, and acknowledges giving a "fiery speech", but denied ever encouraging anyone to join al Qaeda. They report Al Dossary denied having any ties to al Qaeda or terrorism.

== U.S. Embassy in Bahrain responds to abuse allegations ==
On November 9, 2005, the U.S. Embassy in Bahrain issued a statement to respond to the allegations that Dossary had been abused, and that his physical and mental health was at risk. The Embassy statement asserted:

The US government takes all allegations of abuse seriously. When a credible allegation of improper conduct surfaces, it is reviewed, and when factually warranted, investigated.

As a result of the investigation, administrative, disciplinary, or judicial action is taken as appropriate.

We have no evidence that substantiates that Mr Al Dossary was the subject of any sexual humiliation.

The statement denied that Al Dossary was kept in solitary confinement, and assured readers that Al Dossary had access to excellent medical care, and insisted that the treatment of detainees held in Guantanamo Bay were "humane".

Mark Sullivan, one of Al Dossary's lawyers, challenged the points in the Embassy's statement. The Gulf Daily News quoted Sullivan as saying he had no knowledge of any judicial action by US authorities following allegations of abuse.

Sullivan connected the incident described in Eric Saar's book, Inside the Wire, where interrogator Sergeant Jeanette Arocho-Burkart smeared a red liquid she claimed was her menses on to a detainee's face with Al Dossary. Sullivan claimed that Dossary was the detainee who was told he was being smeared with menses. However, in press reports that detainee was described as being a Saudi.

== Appeal for an independent medical examination ==
On June 12, 2006 Al Dossary wrote a letter to his lawyer Colangelo-Bryan, requesting an independent medical examination. Al Dossary told Colangelo-Bryan that he acquired a dangerous blood disease as a result of a blood transfusion that followed his March 11, 2006 suicide attempt.

After they (the US military) gave me a blood transfusion after my suicide attempt, I have been suffering from a strange condition,

They carried out an examination of my blood and they told me I have blood diseases and problems.

I request you (his lawyers) to inform my government about this and publish it in the media – and request my government to send a medical delegation to see and confirm that they do not transfer dangerous diseases to me through blood transfusions.

Al Dossary had learned that his father finally died from terminal cancer, shortly before he drafted this letter. The camp authorities had informed him of the death, which they said they learned about over the internet. Al Dossary said that the camp authorities were not allowing him to receive mail from his family, and were withholding his personal belongings from him, and keeping him in solitary confinement.

Al Dossary said that bad news, on top of the news of the blood condition, the withholding of all mail from his family, and the solitary confinement, had left him feeling his death was imminent.

Al Dossary also reported that the camp authorities had promised him a rare phone call to his family, following his father's death.

Al Dossary's June 12 letter was only declassified by the military on July 25, 2006, so it is unknown whether Al Dossary was able to take advantage of the camp authority's offer.

== A letter about suicide ==
A letter Al Dossari wrote on April 18, 2007, was cleared by DoD censors on May 20, 2007. In the letter Al Dossari wrote:

I swear to God, if I have the opportunity I would end my life,

Colangelo-Bryan described Al Dossari as "coherent" but "utterly exhausted and desperate".

Pentagon spokesman Jeffrey D. Gordon denied that al Dossary had been mistreated. He asserted that al Qaeda trained its operatives to claim abuse while incarcerated. According to the Associated Press Simpson said:

This tactic is used in order to gain public sympathy in the hopes that they may be released,

== Saudi repatriation and release ==
On July 16, 2007, the Department of Defense reported that a further sixteen Saudis captives were repatriated from Guantanamo to Saudi custody.

On July 17, 2007, the Gulf Daily News reported that Juma was one of the men repatriated to Saudi custody; that he had been sent to Saudi Arabia because he had joint Bahraini/Saudi citizenship.

The Gulf Daily News reports:

It is understood the former detainees will remain in captivity while the Saudi authorities investigate whether they have any links to any militant organisations.

On August 23, 2007, the Gulf Daily News reported that Juma al Dossari had been released, and was going to receive official assistance from the Saudi government. The article quoted Bahraini Member of Parliament Mohammed Khalid, who said:

Look at what the government of Saudi Arabia has given Juma – a car, monthly allowance, help to find a job and get married.

An article in the December 21, 2007, issue of the Los Angeles Times profiled Al Dosari's rehabilitation. The article quoted al Dosari:

We can't go immediately from getting off a plane from Cuba to living in society. Everything has changed. There are more streets, bridges and buildings here than I remember. I was gone a long time. My driver's license expired while I was in Guantanamo. My father died. Now, I'm trying to get things back on track.

The BBC World Service broadcast a half-hour interview with Al Dossari on June 28, 2008.

== Jumah al Dossari's Washington Post article ==
On August 17, 2008, the Washington Post published an account from Jumah al Dossari of his experiences in US custody. He started his account with being moved when he came across and watched "United 93 (film)" without knowing what it was about. He described how watching the account of the passengers brought him to tears.

He described some of the abuse he went through in US custody, including:

- being beaten so badly he spent three days in intensive care;
- having cigarettes put out on his body;
- being chained to the floor during transportation.
- being sexually assaulted

Al Dossari described the beatings decreasing in frequency in his later years in Guantanamo, but that he was subjected to years of isolation, which he found even more difficult. He concluded:

On the plane ride home, though, I decided that I would have to forgive to go on with my life. I also know that Sept. 11 was a great tragedy that caused some people to do dark things that they would not otherwise do. This knowledge helped me forget my miserable existence in Guantanamo and open my heart to life again, including to my recent re-marriage.

== Meeting with Gordon Brown ==
On November 2, 2008, that British Prime Minister Gordon Brown toured the rehabilitation center for former Guantanamo captives, and, while there spoke with al Dossari, Ghanim al Harbi, and other former captives. The former captives received a flat, a job, and 20,000 pounds for a dowry, so they can get married.

In 2009, at the inauguration of Barack Obama as President of the United States, the Associated Press interviewed al-Dossary, who stated that his only wish was that "...Obama was elected years ago. Guantanamo would not have happened".
