= Mohammed Khalid =

Bahraini politician (born 1964)

Sheikh Mohammed Khalid Ibrahim

Member of the Bahrain Parliament for Constituency 6 of the Northern Governorate
- In office 24 October 2002 – 23 July 2006
- Preceded by: Newly created seat
- Majority: 82.8%

Member of the Bahrain Parliament for Constituency 6 of the Northern Governorate
- In office 2006 – September 2010
- Preceded by: Incumbent
- Succeeded by: Mohammad Al Amadi
- Majority: 54%

Personal details
- Born: 2 November 1964 (age 62)
- Party: Al-Menbar Islamic Society
- Spouse: One
- Children: 4
- Occupation: Politician
- Website: http://boammar.com/

Sheikh Mohammed Khalid Ibrahim (Arabic: محمد خالد إبراهيم, born 2 November 1964) is a Bahraini Islamist politician and a member of the Al-Menbar Islamic Society in Bahrain. He was an MP in the lower house of the Bahraini parliament, having been elected in the 2002 Bahrain parliamentary elections representing a constituency from the Northern Governorate. Khalid is a known outspoken critic of the Bahraini government over conservative issues such as the selling of alcohol.

== Political career ==
=== 2002 Bahrain parliamentary election ===
Khalid was elected to the lower house of Bahrain's parliament in the 2002 Bahrain parliamentary elections, the first elections in Bahrain since 1973. He ran in constituency six for the Northern Governorate, which consists of Hamad Town, and obtained a landslide victory with 82.8% of the vote.

=== Tenure in office ===
In October 2003, when it was announced that Lebanese singer, Nancy Ajram, was to perform in Bahrain, Mr Khalid along with other Islamists in parliament put forward an emergency motion to ban her concert on the grounds of ‘immorality’. The motion was rejected by parliament, but in the aftermath of the parliamentary outcry, youths went on the rampage, unsuccessfully blocking roads in the capital Manama with burning tires, set fire to cars and clashed with police.

Several months later, Khalid was involved in another incident that helped establish cultural boundaries when he led Islamist protests against the Arab version of the reality TV show, Big Brother. Although the producers, MBC, prior to filming had made adjustments to the format after consultations with clerics, Mr Khalid condemned the ‘immorality’ of the programme at a large demonstration of Sunni Islamists outside the Big Brother House. Police reinforcements had to be called after the demonstrators threatened to storm the set, and the production ended after technicians were followed home and given death threats.

Following these successes, Mr Khalid has been outspoken on several other issues: he described rebel fighters facing assault by US troops in Fallujah in Iraq as ‘heroes’, which had led to clashes with Shia MPs. He criticized the annual Spring of Culture arts festival, jointly sponsored by Batelco and the Ministry of Culture, in 2006 as the ‘Spring of Sakhafa’ (Silliness) and stating that clean tourism in the country is dead. In 2007, he branded the festival as the 'Spring of Sex'; in 2005 he described young people competing in the Arab version of Star Academy as ‘scum’ and in 2004, he alleged that Satanists in Bahrain are organizing rock concerts as cover for devil worship.

=== 2006 Bahrain Parliamentary election ===
Khalid was reelected into office in the 2006 Bahrain parliamentary elections with the Menbar party and its loosely allied Al Asalah party won six and five seats in the election respectively.

Mr Khalid has dismissed criticism that his campaign to ban alcohol will damage business, telling parliament: "If this issue will cause trouble, then it makes me proud, because this means that I am pleasing God." His first target is duty-free alcohol sales at Bahrain International Airport, saying "This is an Islamic country and imagine the nation's frontier is booze shops. Prostitution is a profitable investment, so why is it banned in the country? Why don't allow it in the open like alcohol? Alcohol should be criminalised as prostitution, because both are unacceptable Islamically, morally and socially." He has vowed "We will not stop until alcohol disappears from the country and any place where alcohol is sold will be targeted by MPs until they close down, if not today in the future." Bahrain International Airport has gained the ire of Bahrain's Islamists on several occasions, with an Asalah MP seeking to have it moved from Muharraq because of complaints from constituents about 'noise pollution'.

Mr Khalid has been at the forefront of efforts to free Bahrain's three remaining Guantanamo Bay detainees and has been critical of anti-terrorism legislation passed by parliament in 2005, asking: "What is an anti-terror law supposed to achieve? There is no terrorism in Bahrain. We don't need a law. The United States is the center of terrorism on this earth. The American president should be indicted."

During a parliamentary session to debate the budget on 1 July 2006, Mr Khalid was punched in the face by another MP Jassim Malawi after MPs exchanged a barrage of expletives .

Mr Khalid has vowed to constituents to continue to campaign on these issues, promising that if he ever were to go back on his word he would offer his bisht for ceremonial burning.

At the end of his term in 2010, he decided not to run again for office and was succeeded by Mohammad Al Amadi of his own party.
