= Golapganj Upazila =

Upazila of Sylhet, Bangladesh

Golapganj গোলাপগঞ্জ
- Upazila
- Golapganj Upazila
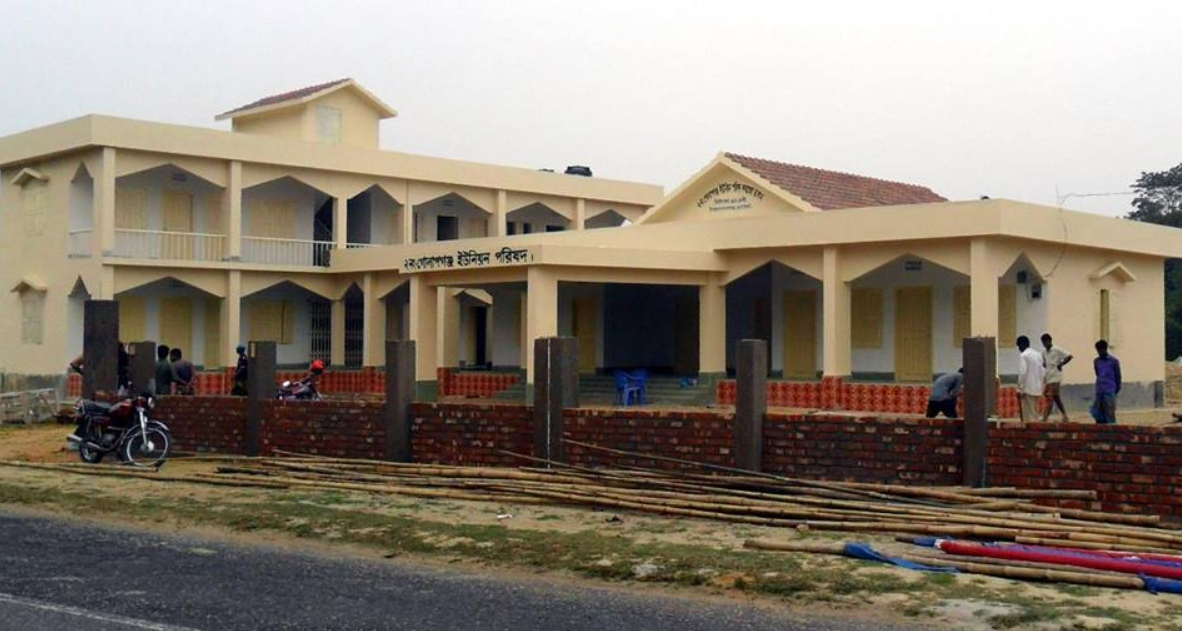
- Golabganj Sadar Union Parishad Complex, Golabganj Upazila

- Coordinates: 24.8469°N 92.0200°E
- Country: Bangladesh
- Division: Sylhet
- District: Sylhet

Government
  - Chairman: Vacant (ad interim)

Area
  - Total: 278.33 km^{2} (107.46 sq mi)

Population (2022)
  - Total: 331,358
  - Density: 1,190.5/km^{2} (3,083.4/sq mi)
- Demonym(s): Golapganji, Golapgonji, Gulabgoinji
- Time zone: UTC+6 (BST)
- Postal code: 3160
- Area code: 08227
- Website: golapganj.sylhet.gov.bd

Golapganj Upazila mauza geocode map

Golapganj Upazila (Bengali: গোলাপগঞ্জ), previously known as Gulabganj, is an upazila of Sylhet District in Sylhet Division, Bangladesh.

== Geography ==
Golapganj Upazila (Sylhet District) area 278.33 km^{2}, located in between 24°41' and 24°55' north latitudes and in between 91°55' and 92°06' east longitudes. It is bounded by Sylhet Sadar, Jaintiapur and Kanaighat upazilas on the north, Fenchuganj and Barlekha upazilas on the south, Beanibazar and Barlekha on the east, Sylhet Sadar and Dakshin Surma Upazila on the west.

=== Waterbodies ===
Surma, Kushiyara, Sonai; Singari Beel, Bagha Beel, Fatamati Beel, Parea Beel and Sonadubi Beel are notable.

== History ==
A thana was founded in Hetimganj originally and then moved to Golabganj Bazaar. The Golabganj Thana was formed in 1906. Revolts in Ronikeli and Bhadeshwar were held during the Nankar Rebellion. In the aftermath of the Bangladesh War of Independence of 1971, a mass grave was found in Sundisail and there remains a monument in the upazila as a memorial. It was upgraded to an upazila in 1983.

== Demographics ==
Religions in Golapganj Upazila (2022)
Religion	Percent
Islam	95.59%
Hinduism	4.39%
Other or not stated	0.02%

According to the 2022 Bangladeshi census, Golapganj Upazila had 62,777 households and a population of 331,358. 8.92% of the population were under 5 years of age. Golapganj had a literacy rate (age 7 and over) of 81.40%: 83.23% for males and 79.78% for females, and a sex ratio of 90.28 males for every 100 females. 76,966 (23.23%) lived in urban areas.

According to the 2011 Census of Bangladesh, Golapganj Upazila had 50,465 households and a population of 316,149. 79,084 (25.01%) were under 10 years of age. Golapganj had a literacy rate (age 7 and over) of 57.00%, compared to the national average of 51.8%, and a sex ratio of 1050 females per 1000 males. 37,457 (11.85%) lived in urban areas.

In 2001, total population of Golapganj Upazila was 263,953, of which males were 132,189, and females 131,764. Muslims were 252,167, Hindus 11,725, Christians 21, and others 40. Indigenous communities such as Manipuri and Tripura belong to this upazila.

As of the 1991 Census of Bangladesh, Golabganj has a population of 229,074. Males constitute are 50.29% of the population, and females 49.71%. This Upazila's eighteen up population is 110364. Golabganj has an average literacy rate of 38.7% (7+ years), and the national average of 32.4% literate.

=== Main sources of income ===
Agriculture 34.05%, non-agricultural laborer 6.03%, industry 0.94%, commerce 14.64%, transport and communication 4.01%, service 6.16%, construction 2.88%, religious service 0.58%, rent and remittance 18.34%, and others 12.37%. The main crops are paddy, chili, pumpkin, arum, and barbati. Nearly extinct crops are Mustard, sesame, and linseed. Main fruits are jackfruit, mango, litchi, banana, latkon, guava, lemon, shaddock, betel nut and coconut.

==== Ownership of agricultural land ====
Landowner 42.76%, landless 57.24%; agricultural landowner: urban 27.98% and rural 43.91%.

== Administration ==
Golapganj Municipality is subdivided into 9 wards and 23 mahallas.

== Education ==
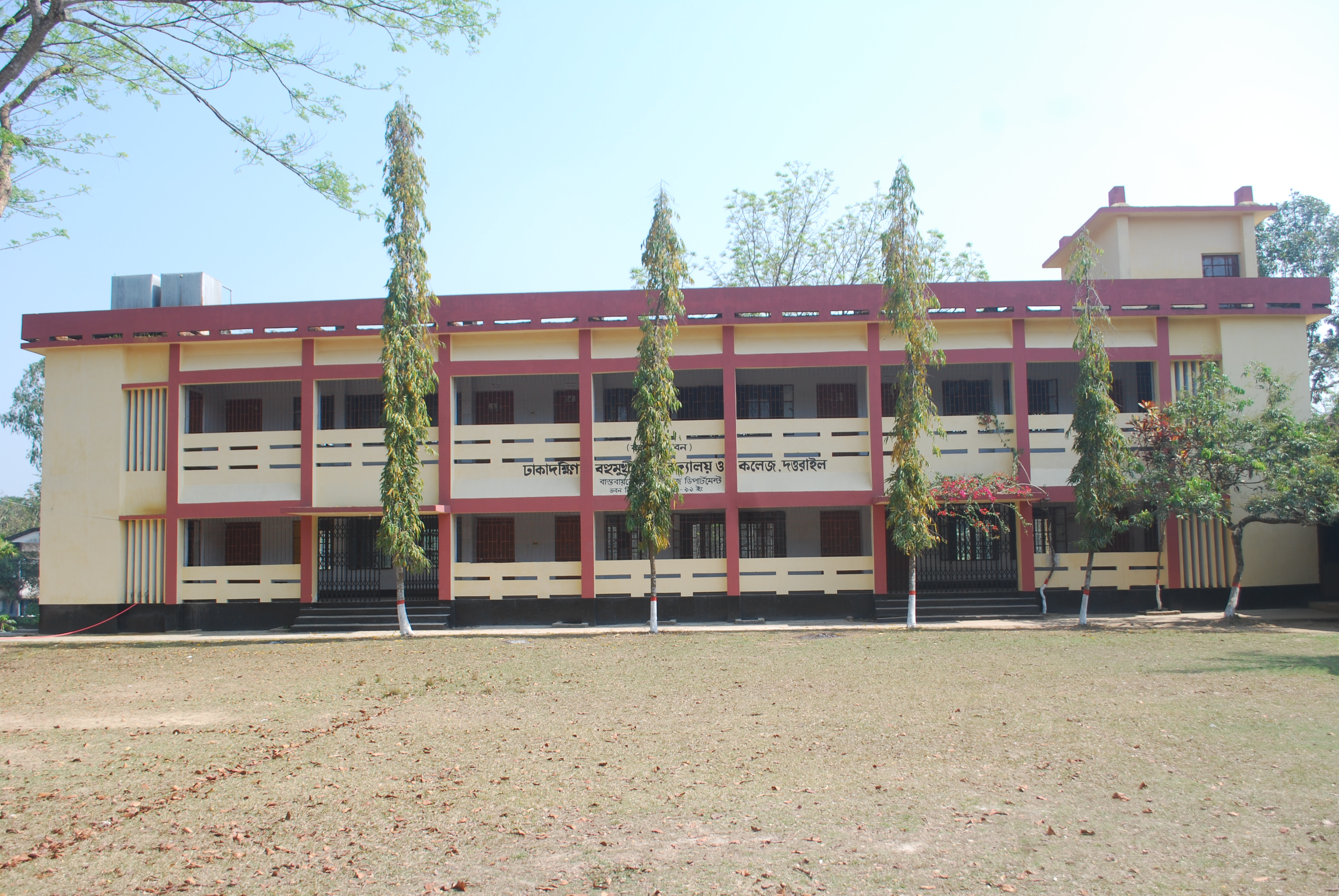
The Dhakadakshin Multilateral High School and College founded in 1898.

There are five colleges in the upazila: Al-Imdad College, Dhaka Dakshin Bahu Mukhi High and College, Bhadeswar College, Bhadeswar Mohila College, Dhaka Dakshin Degree College, and Kushiara College.

According to Banglapedia, Bhadeshwar Nasiruddin High School, founded in 1919, Dhakadakshin Multilateral High School and College (1898), and MC Academy (1934) are notable secondary schools.

Average literacy 48.24%; male 50.89%, female 45.64%.

== Newspapers and periodicals ==
- G Voice24

== Tourist spots ==
Bangladesh Scouts (Sylhet region), Petrobangla, Kailash Tila and the birthplace of Sri Chaitanya Dev.' Mazar of Bahauddin, house and temple of sri chaitanya Dev, Kailash Tila and Dewan Bridge.

== Notable people ==
- Abdul Matin Chaudhury
- Arjumand Ali

== See also ==
- Beanibazar Upazila
- Districts of Bangladesh
- Divisions of Bangladesh
- Thanas of Bangladesh
- Administrative geography of Bangladesh
