= Constitution Project =

Non-profit organization

The Constitution Project
- Formation: 1997; 29 years ago
- Headquarters: Washington, D.C., U.S.
- Website: www.pogo.org/projects/the-constitution-project/

The Constitution Project is a non-profit think tank in the United States whose goal is to build bipartisan consensus on significant constitutional and legal questions. Its founder and president is Virginia Sloan. The Constitution Project’s work is divided between two programs: the Rule of Law Program and the Criminal Justice Program. Each program houses bipartisan committees focused on specific constitutional issues.

== Rule of Law Program ==
The Rule of Law Program addresses perceived threats to the rule of law and to constitutional liberties that have resulted from the assertions of expansive presidential authority in the aftermath of the attacks of September 11, 2001, Congress’s simultaneous failure to exercise its duties as a separate and independent branch of government, and efforts by both Congress and the President to strip the courts of their jurisdiction to oversee the actions of the executive and legislative branches.

=== Liberty and Security Committee ===
The Liberty and Security Committee of the Rule of Law Program is co-chaired by David D. Cole, professor of law at Georgetown University Law Center, and David Keene, former chairman of the American Conservative Union. The Committee is convened to address the “variety of important questions about how to enhance our security while simultaneously protecting our civil liberties.” Members of the committee have authored columns for major newspapers on watch lists, the state secrets privilege, habeas corpus, and public video surveillance.

==== Legal briefs ====
Padilla v. Rumsfeld, US Court of Appeals for the Second Circuit
The Constitution Project, with the Cato Institute, the Center for National Security Studies, the Lawyers Committee for Human Rights, People for the American Way, and the Rutherford Institute, filed an amicus brief in support of José Padilla.
Padilla v. Rumsfeld, Supreme Court of the United States
The Constitution Project, with the Cato Institute, the Center for National Security Studies, the Lawyers Committee for Human Rights, People for the American Way, and the Rutherford Institute, filed an amicus brief in support of José Padilla.
Padilla v. Hanft, US Court of Appeals for the Fourth Circuit
The Constitution Project, with the Center for National Security Studies, filed an amicus brief in support of José Padilla.
Hamdan v. Rumsfeld, Supreme Court of the United States
The Constitution Project filed an amicus brief in support of Salim Ahmed Hamdan.
ACLU v. NSA, US Court of Appeals for the Sixth Circuit
The Constitution Project, with the Center for National Security Studies, filed an amicus brief in support of the ACLU.
Rahmani v. United States, Supreme Court of the United States
The Constitution Project filed an amicus brief urging the Court to grant certiorari to Roya Rahmani.
NIMJ v. Department of Defense, US Court of Appeals for the DC Circuit
The Constitution Project filed an amicus brief in support of the National Institute for Military Justice.
El-Masri v. United States
The Constitution Project filed an amicus brief urging the Court to grant certiorari to Khaled El-Masri.

== Criminal Justice Program ==
The Criminal Justice Program seeks to counter a broad-based effort to deny fundamental day-in-court rights and due process protections to those accused of crimes.

=== Death Penalty Committee ===
The Death Penalty Committee of the Criminal Justice Program is co-chaired by Gerald Kogan, former Chief Justice of the Florida Supreme Court, and Beth Wilkinson, a prosecutor in the Oklahoma City bombing case. The Death Penalty Committee is a bipartisan committee of death penalty supporters and opponents who believe that the risk of wrongful executions in the United States is too high. It was formerly known as the National Committee to Prevent Wrongful Executions.

==== Reports and statements ====
Mandatory Justice – Eighteen Reforms to the Death Penalty
The report “expresses the Committee’s deep concerns with regard to the implementation of the death penalty in the United States, and calls for crucial reforms, including in the areas of effective counsel, racial fairness, and proportionality.”
Mandatory Justice – The Death Penalty Revisited
An update to the committee’s first publication on the topic, the report notes “some improvements in recent years and identifies further steps that must still be taken in order to minimize mistakes and increase fairness and accuracy.”

=== Right to Counsel Committee ===
The Right to Counsel Committee is co-chaired by Walter Mondale (honorary), former Vice-President of the United States, William S. Sessions (honorary), a partner at Holland & Knight LLP, former Director of the FBI, and former Chief Judge of the United States District Court for the Western District of Texas, Rhoda Billings, former Chief Justice of the North Carolina Supreme Court, Robert Johnson, District Attorney for Anoka County, Minnesota, and former president of the National District Attorneys Association, and Timothy K. Lewis, counsel at Schnader Harrison Segal & Lewis LLP and former Judge of the U.S. Court of Appeals for the Third Circuit.

== Task Force on Detainee Treatment ==
In the fall of 2010, the Constitution Project initiated an eleven-person Task Force on Detainee Treatment.

=== Members ===
Members of the Task Force on Detainee Treatment as of 2010
Name	Notes
Eleanor J. Hill	
Asa Hutchinson	Former Congressman and Governor of Arkansas
James R. Jones	Former Ambassador to Mexico
Talbot “Sandy” D’Alemberte	
Richard A. Epstein	
David P. Gushee	
Azizah al-Hibri	
David Irvine	Brigadier General, USA (Ret.)
William S. Sessions	Former Director of the Federal Bureau of Investigation
Gerald E. Thomson	
Patricia M. Wald	Judge for the United States Court of Appeals for the District of Columbia Circuit

== Board of directors ==
The Constitution Project is governed by a board of directors. The board is currently chaired by Armando Gomez, a partner at the law firm of Skadden Arps who previously served as an attorney-advisor to the IRS and as chief counsel to the National Commission on Restructuring the Internal Revenue Service. Other members of the board include:

- David Beier: Managing director at Bay City Capital LLC and former Chief Domestic Policy Adviser to Vice President Al Gore
- Mariano-Florentino Cuéllar : Stanley Morrison Professor of Law at Stanford University and former Obama and Clinton Administration official
- Kristine Huskey : Associate clinical professor and director at the Veterans’ Advocacy Clinic at the James E. Rogers College of Law at The University of Arizona, and former director of the Anti-Torture Program at Physicians for Human Rights
- Asa Hutchinson : Former Member of Congress (R-AR) and former Under Secretary for Border and Transportation Security at the Department of Homeland Security, and administrator of the Drug Enforcement Administration, under President George W. Bush
- Brig. Gen. David R. Irvine: Former Republican state legislator, retired Army brigadier general, and former instructor of prisoner-of-war interrogation and military law at the Sixth U.S. Army Intelligence School
- David Keene : Former chair of the American Conservative Union and Nixon Administration official
- AbdAllah El Bey : Minister of Jurisprudence Private Attorney General Director of Constitutional Studies at the Moorish American National Govt
- Timothy K. Lewis : Co-chair of the appellate practice at the law firm of Schnader, Harrison, Segal & Lewis LLP and former judge of the United States Court of Appeals for the Third Circuit and for the United States District Court for the Western District of Pennsylvania
- Lawrence D. Rosenberg: Partner at the law firm of Jones Day and co-chair of the Trial Practice Committee of the American Bar Association’s Litigation Section
- William S. Sessions : Partner at the law firm of Holland & Knight LLP, former director of the Federal Bureau of Investigation and former chief judge for the United States District Court for the Western District of Texas
- Jane C. Sherburne : Senior executive vice president and general counsel to The Bank of New York Mellon, member of the Council of the Administrative Conference of the United States and former Clinton Administration official
- Bradley D. Simon : Founding partner of Simon & Partners LLP and former Assistant U.S. Attorney for the Eastern District of New York
- Virginia Sloan: President and founder of the Constitution Project

Board members Emeritus include:

- Mickey Edwards : Former Member of Congress (R-OK) and vice president and director of the Rodel Fellowship in Public Leadership Program at the Aspen Institute
- Phoebe Haddon: Dean of The University of Maryland Francis King Carey School of Law
- Morton Halperin : Director of US Advocacy at the Open Society Institute – DC
- Stephen F. Hanlon: Founder of the Community Services Team at the law firm Holland & Knight
- Laurie Robinson: Former Assistant Attorney General for the U.S. Department of Justice Office of Justice Programs
- Paul C. Saunders: Retired partner at the law firm Cravath, Swaine & Moore

== See also ==
- The Imperial Presidency
- United States Constitution
- United States constitutional law
