= Ahrens v. Clark =

- Supreme Court of the United States

Argued March 29, 1948 Decided June 21, 1948
- Full case name: Ahrens et al. v. Clark, Atty. Gen.
- Citations: 335 U.S. 188 (more) 68 S. Ct. 1443; 92 L. Ed. 2d 1898; 1948 U.S. LEXIS 1936

Holding
- Unless detained persons are within the territorial jurisdiction of the federal district court they petition, the court lacks jurisdiction to issue a writ of habeas corpus.

Court membership
- Chief Justice Fred M. Vinson Associate Justices Hugo Black · Stanley F. Reed; Felix Frankfurter · William O. Douglas; Frank Murphy · Robert H. Jackson; Wiley B. Rutledge · Harold H. Burton

Case opinions
- Majority: Douglas, joined by Vinson, Reed, Frankfurter, Jackson, Burton
- Dissent: Rutledge, joined by Black, Murphy

Laws applied
- 28 U.S.C. 452, 28 U.S.C.A. 452
- Overruled by
- Braden v. 30th Judicial Circuit Court of Kentucky, 410 U.S. 484 (1973) (in part)

Ahrens v. Clark, 335 U.S. 188 (1948), was a United States Supreme Court case that denied a federal district court jurisdiction to issue a writ of habeas corpus if the person detained is not within the territorial jurisdiction of the court when the petition is filed. The 6–3 ruling was handed down on June 21, 1948, with the majority opinion written by Justice William O. Douglas and the dissent written by Justice Wiley Blount Rutledge.

The decision was substantially overturned in Braden v. 30th Judicial Circuit Court of Kentucky (1973), which held that territorial jurisdiction is derived from the location of the custodian, those responsible for the indictment, rather than the location of the detention.

== Overview ==
The United States District Court for the District of Columbia had been petitioned by 120 German detainees being held on Ellis Island for a writ of habeas corpus to challenge in court their detention and imminent deportation. The deportation order had been issued by Attorney General Tom C. Clark, using wartime powers granted by President Harry Truman in the waning months of World War II. The detainees argued that the US Court for DC had jurisdiction because they were being held "subject to the custody and control" of the Attorney General. The government argued that their case should be dismissed because Ellis Island is outside of the territorial confines of the District of Columbia. The Supreme Court, the federal appeals courts, and the federal district courts had the power to grant writs of habeas corpus "within their respective jurisdictions"; the case hinged on whether the words "within their respective jurisdictions" implied a territorial limitation. The court held that they did.

== Opinion ==
In an opinion written by Justice William O. Douglas, the Supreme Court held that a petition for a writ of habeas corpus cannot issue against a person detained outside of the territorial jurisdiction of the District Court hearing the case. Since Attorney General Clark fell within the jurisdiction of the D.C.-based District Court – and was arguably the custodian of the Ellis Island detainees – Ahrens argued that habeas could issue notwithstanding their remote location. The Court disagreed, emphasizing that habeas corpus is directed at the prisoner rather than the custodian.

The Court's inquiry focused significantly on the overall statutory scheme of habeas corpus. Conceding that the general habeas statute, 28 U.S.C. § 452, is "directed to the person in whose custody the party is detained," the Court deduced from related statutes that Congress did not intend to permit habeas to issue to prisoners outside of the Court's territorial jurisdiction. Referring to § 458, which required a custodian in habeas proceedings to present the prisoner in court, Douglas wrote that "[i]t would take compelling reasons to conclude that Congress contemplated the production of prisoners from remote sections, perhaps thousands of miles from the District Court that issued the writ." Concerns such as flight risks, travel costs, and administrative issues, Douglas continued, further counsel restraint against reinterpreting § 452 in the manner advanced by Ahrens.

Next, the Court traced the history of the habeas statute at issue, which became law via the Act of February 5, 1867. Upon introduction of the bill in the Senate, Douglas explained, objection was made to the original statute's jurisdictional breadth; "it would permit 'a district judge in Florida to bring before him some men convicted and sentenced and held under imprisonment in the State of Vermont or in any of the further States.'" A sponsor of the bill cured that issue by adding the language "within their respective jurisdictions" to the statute, reflecting what Douglas understood as the common-law background ("the accepted view") that territorial presence of the prisoner was requisite to habeas jurisdiction. The Court additionally explained that the territorial jurisdiction issue was not waivable by the parties, since the limitation concerned the basic power of the court over the parties.

Lastly, Justice Douglas distinguished Ex parte Endo, 323 U.S. 283 (1944). In that case the Court found habeas jurisdiction appropriate despite the prisoner's removal from the court's territorial jurisdiction after suit was instituted. After it has been properly invoked, jurisdiction cannot be defeated by subsequent conduct removing the parties from the court's territorial reach. Here, by contrast, the Ellis Island detainees were at no relevant period within the territorial jurisdiction of the District Court.

The Court did not reach the issue of whether Attorney General Clark was the proper Respondent for a habeas corpus claim. Over fifty years later, however, the Court explained in Rumsfeld v. Padilla, 542 U.S. 426 (2004) that in habeas cases challenging present physical confinement, the 'immediate custodian' is the proper respondent. The 'immediate custodian' is the person with actual, direct control over the prisoner's custody like a prison warden or state Department of Corrections head, "not the Attorney General or some other remote supervisory official."

The Court would have another opportunity to consider the territorial reach of judges exercising habeas jurisdiction in Braden v. 30th Judicial Circuit Court of Kentucky, 410 U.S. 484 (1973). In that case, Justice Brennan disavowed a reading of Ahrens "indicating that the prisoner's presence within the territorial confines of the district is an invariable prerequisite to the exercise of the District Court's habeas corpus jurisdiction." For that reason, Braden is regarded as having overruled Ahrens to the extent that it found jurisdiction over the relevant custodian insufficient to confer territorial jurisdiction over the habeas claim.

== Dissent ==
A dissent by Justice Wiley Blount Rutledge, joined by Justices Hugo Black and Frank Murphy, described the majority's opinion as "cut[ting] much more sweepingly at the roots of individual freedom by its decision upon the jurisdictional issue than could any disposition of those issues." Rutledge's opinion was particularly concerned that the Court's decision was narrowly construing the great writ of habeas corpus.

He wrote:

If this is or is to become the law, the full ramifications of the decision are difficult to foresee. It would seem that a great contraction of the writ's classic scope and exposition has taken place, and much of its historic efficacy may have been destroyed. For if absence of the body from the jurisdiction is alone conclusive against existence of power to issue the writ, what of the case where the place of imprisonment, whether by private or public action, is unknown? What also of the situation where that place is located in one district, but the jailer is present in and can be served with process only in another? And if the place of detention lies wholly outside the territorial limits of any federal jurisdiction, although the person or persons exercising restraint are clearly within reach of such authority, is there to be no remedy, even though it is American citizens who are wrongfully deprived of their liberty and Americans answerable to no other power who deprive them of it, whether purporting to act officially or otherwise? In all these cases may the jailers stand in defiance of federal judicial power, and plead either the accident of the locus of detention outside the court's territorial limitations, or their own astuteness in so selecting the place, to nullify judicial competence?

== Significance ==
The case was newly significant in the 21st century because the question of territorial jurisdiction arose during the U.S. war on terror following the 9/11 attacks. The United States detained hundreds of foreign captives at a US Navy facility in Guantanamo Bay, which it held was outside the territorial jurisdiction of all federal district courts. Detainees petitioned the federal courts for habeas corpus challenges of their detention, and some cases reached the US Supreme Court.

Justice John Paul Stevens had clerked for Justice Wiley Rutledge during the term Ahrens v. Clark was decided. He helped draft Justice Rutledge's dissenting opinion in the case and knew his reasoning. He also knew of Braden v. 30th Judicial Circuit Court (1973), in which the Supreme Court held:

The writ of habeas corpus does not act upon the prisoner who seeks relief, but upon the person who holds him in what is alleged to be unlawful custody... [T]he language of Section 2241(a) requires nothing more than that the court issuing the writ have jurisdiction over the custodian. So long as the custodian can be reached by service of process, the court can issue a writ 'within its jurisdiction' requiring that the prisoner be brought before the court for a hearing on his claim, or requiring that he be released outright from custody, even if the prisoner himself is confined outside the court's territorial jurisdiction...

Justice Stevens used his background from the cases when drafting the majority opinion in Rasul v. Bush (2004). The Court held that the US courts had jurisdiction in the US Circuit Court for the District of Columbia over the officers of the executive branch who were the policymakers and ultimate custodians of the detainees and the facility at Guantanamo.

== See also ==
- Hamdan v. Rumsfeld (2006)
- Boumediene v. Bush (2008)
- List of United States Supreme Court cases, volume 335
- List of United States Supreme Court cases
- Lists of United States Supreme Court cases by volume
- List of United States Supreme Court cases by the Vinson Court
