= Moyer v. Peabody =

- Supreme Court of the United States

Argued January 5–6, 1909 Decided January 18, 1909
- Full case name: Charles H. Moyer, Plaintiff in Error, v. James H. Peabody, Sherman M. Bell, and Bulkeley Wells
- Citations: 212 U.S. 78 (more) 29 S. Ct. 235; 53 L. Ed. 410; 1909 U.S. LEXIS 1798

Case history
- Prior: Error to the Circuit Court of the United States for the District of Colorado

Holding
- Affirmed dismissal of detainee's action for wrongful imprisonment against the ex-Governor, former Adjutant General of the national guard, and a national guard company captain.

Court membership
- Chief Justice Melville Fuller Associate Justices John M. Harlan · David J. Brewer; Edward D. White · Rufus W. Peckham; Joseph McKenna · Oliver W. Holmes Jr. William R. Day · William H. Moody

Case opinion
- Majority: Holmes, joined by Fuller, Harlan, Brewer, White, Peckham, McKenna, Day
- Moody took no part in the consideration or decision of the case.

Laws applied
- U.S. Const. amend. XIV

Moyer v. Peabody, 212 U.S. 78 (1909), is a decision by the United States Supreme Court which held that the governor and officers of a state National Guard, acting in good faith and under authority of law, may imprison without probable cause a citizen of the United States in a time of insurrection and deny that citizen the right of habeas corpus.

== Background ==
The case arose out of a wave of labor disputes, known as the Colorado Labor Wars, in the mining industry in the state of Colorado. In August 1902, the Western Federation of Miners (WFM) organized mill workers in Colorado City, Colorado. The employers planted a spy in the union, and the evidence of union activity gathered by the mole led to the dismissal of 42 union members. Union-employer negotiations over the dismissals began almost immediately, and dragged on into 1903. With the negotiations at a standstill, the WFM struck on February 14, 1903. After the number of miners walking the picket lines grew in March and April, the mine owners decided to seek state aid.

Governor James Peabody was strongly anti-union, and the employers worked with him to craft a response that would break the strike and the union. Although Colorado City was quiet and no public disorders of any magnitude had occurred, the employers and local authorities claimed extensive rioting had occurred and that local and county law enforcement were unable to handle the mobs. Governor Peabody called out the Colorado militia, investing them around Colorado City. Outraged miners in nearby Cripple Creek and the western city of Telluride also walked off the job, and the militia was deployed in those cities as well.

Mass arrests began in September 1903, breaking the strike. One of those arrested was Charles Moyer.

Moyer had traveled to Telluride to protest the mass arrests and deportation of miners. He lent his signature to a WFM poster (see right) denouncing the arrests. Moyer was arrested on March 28, 1904, for desecrating the American flag. He was released on bail, but re-arrested the following day on the orders of the Adjutant General of the state militia on the grounds of "military necessity."

Moyer's predicament was not unusual. The state militia had detained hundreds of striking workers and union leaders for many weeks in bullpens and had disregarded hundreds of habeas corpus petitions.

Moyer petitioned a Colorado state court for a writ of habeas corpus, which was granted. However, the Colorado State Attorney General and the local district attorney refused to honor the writ. Moyer appealed to the Colorado Supreme Court. On June 6, 1904, the Colorado Supreme Court ruled in In re Moyer, that Moyer's constitutional right to due process and habeas corpus had not been violated. The court held that the governor had acted under color of state law and that the courts had no jurisdiction to review the governor's finding that a state of insurrection existed in Colorado.

Moyer appealed to the U.S. District Court in Missouri, and obtained a writ of habeas corpus on July 5, 1904.

Alarmed by the writ, Governor Peabody revoked the finding of insurrection the same day and ordered Moyer released by 3:45 p.m. before the federal writ could be served. Moyer was released but continued to press his case. The U.S. Supreme Court accepted certiorari, and oral argument occurred on January 5 and January 6, 1909.

== Decision ==
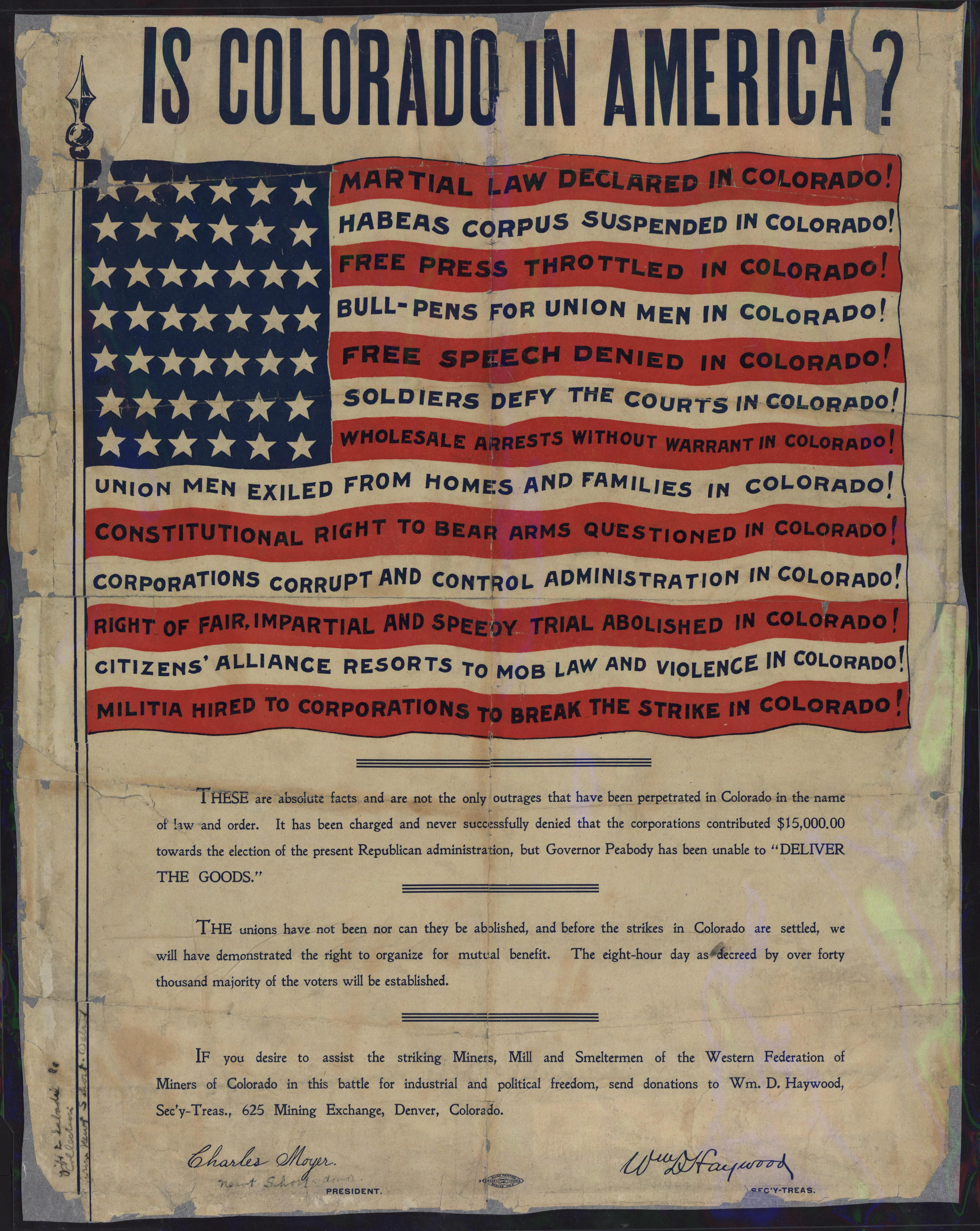
The poster "Is Colorado in America?" with its American flag, with signature by Charles Moyer (bottom, left), which led to Moyer's arrest in 1904 and the Supreme Court case of Moyer v. Peabody

Associate Justice Oliver Wendell Holmes Jr. delivered the opinion for a unanimous court. The decision was seven paragraphs long with the first three paragraphs devoted to determining the jurisdiction of the court.

Holmes began by refusing to question whether a state of insurrection actually existed in Colorado. "It is admitted, as it must be, that the Governor's declaration that a state of insurrection existed is conclusive of that fact," Holmes wrote. "The facts that we are to assume are that a state of insurrection existed and that the Governor, without sufficient reason but in good faith, in the course of putting the insurrection down held the plaintiff until he thought that he safely could release him. Holmes then made what is considered a famous statement about due process: "But it is familiar that what is due process of law depends on circumstances. It varies with the subject-matter and the necessities of the situation."

The existence of the state of insurrection was, therefore, critical. Both the state constitution and the statutes gave the governor the power to call out the militia, put down rebellion, and hold rebels without providing for relief. Holmes incorporated the findings of the Colorado Supreme Court in his opinion andonce more refused to entertain any arguments to the contrary: "In such a situation we must assume that he had a right under the state constitution and laws to call out troops, as was held by the Supreme Court of the State." But Holmes' assumptions were not ironclad. He left open the door for plaintiffs to challenge whether or not a state of insurrection did, in fact, exist. In this case, however, the plaintiff did not do so.

Absent any such challenge by the plaintiff to the factual situation, Holmes concluded that plaintiffs have no recourse under law. Holmes placed his faith utterly in the democratic process and a citizenry's ability to elect leaders of "good faith:"

So long as such arrests are made in good faith and in the honest belief that they are needed in order to head the insurrection off, the Governor is the final judge and cannot be subjected to an action after he is out of office on the ground that he had not reasonable ground for his belief.

The judgment left plaintiffs one straw to cling to. Holmes suggested in dicta that plaintiffs might have grounds if their imprisonment were lengthy: "If we suppose a Governor with a very long term of office," Holmes hypothesized, "it may be that a case could be imagined in which the length of the imprisonment would raise a different question. However, since Moyer's incarceration had lasted only four months, it was implied that the line had not been crossed.

Moody took no part in the case due to an extensive illness.

== Aftermath ==
Moyer v. Peabody was long moot by the time the case reached the Supreme Court, which accepted the case only because it arose under demurrer, which challenged the legal sufficiency of the government's action. Although the case was accepted on demurrer, the Court refused to acknowledge that Moyer had in fact contested Peabody's finding that a state of insurrection existed in Colorado in 1904.

=== Effect on the labor movement ===
Historians argue that the case radicalized a significant portion of the American labor movement. Moyer himself concluded that the state's use of military power to crush unions could be countered only by a syndicalist union linked to a potent political party. Subsequently, Moyer and the WFM helped found the radical Industrial Workers of the World in 1905. While Samuel Gompers and the American Federation of Labor sought an accommodation with capitalism and the status quo, a large minority of American workers did not, and another three decades of labor unrest was caused, in part, by desperate workers who felt that the courts were closed to them.

=== Legal analysis ===
Moyer v. Peabody had its foundation in previous court rulings in the United States and spawned a number of subsequent decisions. It was one in a long line of cases extending back through Ex parte Merryman, 17 F. Cas. 144 (1861), Ex parte Benedict, 3 F. Cas. 159 (N.D.N.Y. 1862), and Ex parte Milligan, 71 U.S. 2 (1866). In this regard, it has a lengthy legal pedigree. But the case also spawned a new line of legal analysis. For example, one Supreme Court justice called Moyer the foundation of the "'good-faith' analysis...of our modern doctrine of qualified immunity."

Despite the firm grounding Moyer v. Peabody has in US constitutional law, the case is considered to be controversial. In Luther v. Borden, 48 U.S. 1 (1849), the US Supreme Court had established the "political question" test in which a court may refuse to rule because the issue is political, rather than judicial. Moyer is controversial in part because Justice Holmes took much of the dicta in Luther and made it binding law. The decision is controversial also because despite the analysis in Ex parte Benedict, Moyer allowed states to implement martial law without judicial review.

Although Moyer focused on the immediacy of war, the aspect of the ruling has proven troublesome to the courts. Earlier Supreme Court decisions had emphasized the importance of the existence of open conflict. For example, in Mitchell v. Harmony, 54 U.S. (13 How.) 115 (1851), the Supreme Court upheld the power of military officials to seize property to prevent violence. But the Court limited that power by requiring the danger to be immediate. In some ways, Moyer retreats from the court's ruling in Mitchell: Holmes accepted the case under demurrer, but then refused to consider Moyer's challenge to the finding of a state of emergency. Moyer nevertheless stands in the tradition of Mitchell because the Moyer court recognized that only immediate violence was grounds for suspending the writ.

The vexing problem of immediacy would cause the Supreme Court to later back away from Holmes' ruling in Moyer. Just a quarter of a century later, in Sterling v. Constantin, 287 U.S. 378 (1932), the Court held (contra Moyer) that executive findings of a state of insurrection must be subject to judicial review. In Sterling, the governor of Texas had restricted production of oil from certain wells by claiming that a state of insurrection existed in some areas of his state. The Supreme Court concluded that such claims of insurrection were subject to judicial review, and after review, the Court actually rejected the governor's finding. Citing Mitchell v. Harmony, the Court endorsed "the argument that without judicial review, the boundaries setting apart real emergencies will break down. Chief Justice Hughes explicitly articulated the fear that if emergency powers are beyond court scrutiny then soon all government action will be characterized as an emergency."

For most of the 20th century, Supreme Court jurisprudence ignored Moyer. Prior to 2004, the last decision to rely heavily on Moyer was Scheuer v. Rhodes, 416 U.S. 232 in 1973. In Scheuer v. Rhodes, survivors of the victims of the Kent State shootings of 1970 sued the Ohio Army National Guard for damages. A lower court rejected the suit, using the rationale provided in Moyer. The U.S. Supreme Court unanimously reversed, "emptying the Moyer precedent of most of its residual authority."

After the 9/11 attacks, however, Moyer took on new significance. In 2004, the case was thoroughly discussed in the Supreme Court's "illegal enemy combatant" decision, Hamdi v. Rumsfeld. The Moyer case may take on increasing significance in the future as the "war on terror" continues: "The ruling's appeal to present-day government lawyers is obvious. The administration has taken pains to emphasize that the Padilla detention order—like the order establishing the ground rules for military commissions—was signed by President Bush in the exercise of his authority as commander-in-chief. And if a state governor playing commander-in-chief can persuade the courts to rubber-stamp his abusive actions, surely a President can, too."

== See also ==
- List of United States Supreme Court cases, volume 212
