= Kifah Jayyousi =

Jordanian-born American prisoner

Kifah Jayyousi, is a Jordanian-born United States citizen, tried and convicted alongside Jose Padilla and Adham Hassoun in 2007 of conspiracy to murder, kidnap and maim overseas. He was sentenced to a prison term of twelve years and eight months.

Jayyousi and his wife are both US citizens and are the parents of five US children. He has served in the US Navy and was honorably discharged in 1988. He taught at Wayne State University College of Engineering, and held a number of high-profile public service positions in the engineering profession. He maintains his innocence, and says that all he did was publish a newsletter that was critical of US foreign policies, and did a small charity work over 25 years ago that benefited victims of war in Bosnia and Chechnya.

== Arrest and trial ==
Jayyousi, formerly the chief facilities officer the Washington, D.C. School Board, from July 1999 until April 2001, was arrested on March 27, 2005.

U.S. District Judge Marcia Cooke granted bail to Jayyousi on January 5, 2006, in granting bail the judge stated that: "There is no evidence presented in this case that this defendant did other than travel under his own name, follow the law and register in the United States Embassy, and never used false documents." The Judge also noted that: "There was no evidence of any other criminal contact. There was no evidence presented, as part of this criminal investigation, that this defendant had the kind of extensive foreign contracts and travel."

Jayyousi was released from the Federal Detention Center at Miami, Florida where he spent a year in solitary confinement. He attended all subsequent court hearings and stood trial in 2007 with co-defendants Jose Padilla and Adham Hassoun.

During an ensuing hearing, the attorneys argued that the indictment lacked incriminating evidence, and the judge also noted that the case was "very light on facts." The Judge ordered the Miami federal prosecutors to supply evidence of transcripts of phone wiretaps that show the "manner and means of the trio's (referring to Kifah Jayyousi, Adham Hassoun and Jose Padilla) terror conspiracy—including "descriptions of the time, place, circumstances, causes, etc." of their activities."

On Monday 21 August 2006, the Federal Judge dismissed the major terrorism conspiracy count that formed a major part of the indictment in the case saying the government wrongly overcharged the defendants.

On August 16, 2007, Jayyousi and his two co-defendants were found guilty of one count of conspiracy to murder, kidnap and maim overseas. Jayyousi was sentenced to a prison term of twelve years and eight months.

Jayyousi was released in 2017.
