= Johnson v. Eisentrager =

- Supreme Court of the United States

Argued April 17, 1950 Decided June 5, 1950
- Full case name: Louis A. Johnson, Secretary of Defense, et al. v. Lothar Eisentrager, (Note: The defendant's surname was Eisenträger (IPA: [ˈaɪzn̩ˌtʁɛːɡɐ]), but the Supreme Court does not use umlaute in case names.) alias Ludwig Ehrhardt, et al.
- Citations: 339 U.S. 763 (more) 70 S. Ct. 936; 94 L. Ed. 1255; 1950 U.S. LEXIS 1815

Case history
- Prior: Certiorari to the United States Court of Appeals for the District of Columbia Circuit

Holding
- US courts had no jurisdiction over German war criminals held in a US-administered prison in Germany. United States Court of Appeals for the District of Columbia Circuit reversed.

Court membership
- Chief Justice Fred M. Vinson Associate Justices Hugo Black · Stanley F. Reed; Felix Frankfurter · William O. Douglas; Robert H. Jackson · Harold H. Burton; Tom C. Clark · Sherman Minton

Case opinions
- Majority: Jackson, joined by Vinson, Reed, Frankfurter, Clark, Minton
- Dissent: Black, joined by Douglas, Burton

Johnson v. Eisentrager, 339 U.S. 763 (1950), was a major decision of the US Supreme Court, where it decided that US courts had no jurisdiction over German war criminals held in a US-administered prison in Germany. The prisoners had at no time been on American sovereign territory.

This decision was weakened by the Court's ruling in Braden v. 30th Judicial Circuit Court of Kentucky (1973), when the court found that the key to jurisdiction was whether the Court could process service to the custodians. Braden was relied on by the Court in Rasul v. Bush (2004), in which it held that it did have jurisdiction over the detainees held at Guantanamo Bay detention camp because it could reach their custodians, the policymakers and leaders of the Bush administration, who were responsible for their detention.

== Facts ==
On May 8, 1945, the German High Command executed an act of unconditional surrender, expressly obligating all forces under German control at once to cease active hostilities and therefore ending the European Theater of World War II. The prisoners had been convicted in China by an American military commission of violating the laws of war, by engaging in, permitting, or ordering continued military activity against the United States after surrender of Germany and before surrender of Japan. They were transported to the American-occupied part of Germany and imprisoned there in the custody of the US Army. Claiming that their trial, conviction, and imprisonment violated Articles I and III, the Fifth Amendment, and other provisions of the US Constitution, laws of the United States, and provisions of the Geneva Conventions, they petitioned the District Court for the District of Columbia for a writ of habeas corpus directed to the Secretary of Defense, the Secretary of the Army, and several officers of the Army having directive power over their custodian.

The US government argued:

1. A non-resident enemy alien has no access to US courts during wartime.
2. The non-resident enemy aliens, captured and imprisoned abroad, have no right to a writ of habeas corpus in a court of the United States. (See Ex parte Quirin)
3. The Constitution does not confer a right of personal security or immunity from military trial and punishment upon an alien enemy engaged in the hostile service of a government at war with the United States. (In this section, the Army quoted the Geneva Conventions, implicitly recognizing that the prisoners had rights and obligations under them.)

== Decision ==
In their ruling, the Supreme Court justices noted (emphasis added and footnotes removed):

...Modern American law has come a long way since the time when outbreak of war made every enemy national an outlaw, subject to both public and private slaughter, cruelty and plunder. But even by the most magnanimous view, our law does not abolish inherent distinctions recognized throughout the civilized world between citizens and aliens, nor between aliens of friendly and of enemy allegiance, nor between resident enemy aliens who have submitted themselves to our laws and non-resident enemy aliens who at all times have remained with, and adhered to, enemy governments. ...

But, in extending constitutional protections beyond the citizenry, the Court has been at pains to point out that it was the alien's presence within its territorial jurisdiction that gave the Judiciary power to act. ...

If this [Fifth] Amendment invests enemy aliens in unlawful hostile action against us with immunity from military trial, it puts them in a more protected position than our own soldiers.

We hold that the Constitution does not confer a right of personal security or an immunity from military trial and punishment upon an alien enemy engaged in the hostile service of a government at war with the United States.

...It is not for us to say whether these prisoners were or were not guilty of a war crime, or whether if we were to retry the case we would agree to the findings of fact or the application of the laws of war made by the Military Commission. The petition shows that these prisoners were formally accused of violating the laws of war and fully informed of particulars of these charges.

== Aftermath ==
Eisentrager and his 20 codefendants were all released from prison early, later in 1950.

== See also ==
- List of United States Supreme Court cases, volume 339
- List of United States Supreme Court cases by the Vinson Court
- Boumediene v. Bush
- Ex Parte Milligan
- Ex Parte Quirin
- Hamdan v. Rumsfeld
- Hamdi v. Rumsfeld
- Rasul v. Bush
- Rumsfeld v. Padilla
