= List of Emirati detainees at Guantanamo Bay =

The United States Department of Defense acknowledges holding two United Arab Emirates captives in Guantanamo. A total of 780 captives have been held in extrajudicial detention in the Guantanamo Bay detention camps, in Cuba since the camps opened on January 11, 2002, The camp population peaked in 2004 at approximately 660. Only nineteen new captives, all "high value detainees" have been transferred there since the United States Supreme Court's ruling in Rasul v. Bush. As of January 2008, the camp population stood at approximately 285.

Following the Department of Defenses' publication of official lists of captives' names, officials in Abu Dhabi confirmed that Abdulah Al Hamiri is a Yemeni citizen. The second, Muieen Al-Deen Jamal Al-Deen Abd Al-Fusal Abd Al-Sattar, may have been born in Dubai but is not Emirati. According to The Daily Telegraph, he is an ethnic Rohingya Burmese who was born in Dubai, has a Pakistani passport, and lived in Mecca, Saudi Arabia most of his life, where he taught religion at a private school.

== United Arab Emirates captives acknowledged by the DoD ==
isn	name	arrival date	transfer date	notes
ISN 48	Abdulah Alhamiri	2002-01-12	2008-07-26	Al Hamiri was repatriated on August 1, 2008.
309	Muieen A Deen Jamal A Deen Abd Al Fusal Abd Al Sattar	2002-02-10		Not an Emirati citizen, but was born in the UAE.
