= Adham Hassoun =

Adham Amin Hassoun is a convict formerly incarcerated in the United States as a conspirator of José Padilla, an American initially held as an enemy combatant for supplying aid to terrorists.

Hassoun, a Lebanese-born Palestinian who first moved to the United States in the late 1980s, was first arrested in 2002 for overstaying his visa.

In August 2007, he was convicted, along with Padilla, of conspiracy and material support charges and sentenced to a prison term of 15 years, 8 months.

Hassoun had been a computer programmer and resident of Broward County, Florida. Sofian Abdelaziz, a member of the American Muslim Association of North America, who knew Hassoun from his activity in the Florida Muslim community, made this comment on Hassoun: "I would consider him that he's against violence, but he has a strong tongue, you know, he has a strong tongue!"

Hassoun was charged in connection with his financing of Padilla's trip to Egypt. Prosecutors alleged that Hassoun set up a local office of the charity Benevolence International, which was used as a front for al Qaeda. A 2011 NPR report claimed he was being held in a highly restrictive Communication Management Unit.

When Hassoun finished his sentence, in 2017, as a non-citizen, he would normally have been deported. However, since he was stateless, he continued to be imprisoned.

Hassoun was released on July 22, 2020. He was deported and resettled in Rwanda, whose government agreed to receive him on humanitarian grounds.

== Other indicted conspirators ==
- Kifah Jayyousi
