= Braden v. 30th Judicial Circuit Court of Kentucky =

- Supreme Court of the United States

Argued December 5, 1972 Decided February 28, 1973
- Full case name: Charles D. Braden v. 30th Judicial Circuit Court of the Commonwealth of Kentucky
- Citations: 410 U.S. 484 (more)

Court membership
- Chief Justice Warren E. Burger Associate Justices William O. Douglas · William J. Brennan Jr. Potter Stewart · Byron White; Thurgood Marshall · Harry Blackmun; Lewis F. Powell Jr. · William Rehnquist

Case opinions
- Majority: Brennan, joined by Douglas, Stewart, White, Marshall
- Concurrence: Blackmun
- Dissent: Rehnquist, joined by Burger, Powell

Laws applied
- U.S. Const. amend. XIV; 28 U.S.C. § 2241

Braden v. 30th Judicial Circuit Court of Kentucky, 410 U.S. 484 (1973), was a decision of the US Supreme Court regarding the statutory jurisdiction of federal district courts to grant writs of habeas corpus for guaranteeing the right of state prisoners to receive a speedy trial in another state under the Speedy Trial Clause of the Sixth Amendment to the US Constitution.

== Background ==
While serving a prison sentence in Alabama, Charles D. Braden petitioned the US District Court for the Western District of Kentucky for a writ of habeas corpus, seeking a speedy trial to resolve a three-year old indictment from Kentucky's state courts. Braden argued that leaving his Kentucky indictment on a detainer to be resolved at the conclusion of his state prison sentence in Alabama was negatively affecting his reputation at Alabama parole board hearings. In response, the District Court ordered the 30th Judicial Circuit Court of Kentucky to either secure Braden's presence to stand trial in Kentucky within 60 days or Braden's indictment on Kentucky state charges would be dismissed.

In 1948, the Supreme Court had ruled in Ahrens v. Clark that Title 28 of the US Code, which has allowed federal district courts to grant writs of habeas corpus "within their respective jurisdictions" since 1867, did not allow individuals on Ellis Island to challenge the Attorney General's deportation orders by seeking writs of habeas corpus from the US District Court for the District of Columbia. Citing this precedent, the US Court of Appeals for the Sixth Circuit reversed the District Court's order, arguing that it lacked the jurisdiction to issue a writ of habeas corpus, prompting Braden's appeal to the Supreme Court.

== Supreme Court ruling ==
=== Majority ===
First, in the 1968 case Peyton v. Rowe, the Supreme Court allowed prisoners incarcerated under consecutive state prison sentences to petition for writs of habeas corpus regarding subsequent prison sentences which they had yet to serve. Based on this precedent, the majority opinion, written by Associate Justice William J. Brennan Jr., found that Charles Braden was considered eligible to petition for a writ of habeas corpus from a federal district court in Kentucky, despite his current confinement in an Alabama state prison.

Second, in the 1969 case Smith v. Hooey, the Supreme Court ruled that states are required to respond to petitions for a speedy trial with a good faith effort, even if the petitioner is currently serving a federal prison sentence. Extending this precedent, the majority claimed that Braden had exhausted the available state judicial remedies in his unsuccessful petitions for a speedy trial, making him eligible to petition for federal habeas corpus.

Third, the court distinguished its ruling in Ahrens v. Clark by arguing that 28 U.S.C. § 2241 only requires district courts to be capable of service of process to the Alabama state prison. The majority reasoned that if Braden were required to file his habeas corpus petition in an Alabama district court, then the Kentucky state government would be forced to send lawyers across the country and defend its practices to federal judges unfamiliar with Kentucky state law. In comparison, Alabama state law was considered irrelevant to resolving Braden's right to a speedy trial.

The majority noted that while the Sixth Circuit believed habeas corpus petitions should be filed in the District Court where Braden was incarcerated, Alabama is within the Fifth Circuit Court of Appeals, which ruled in May v. Georgia (1969) that federal habeas corpus petitions should be filed in the District Court of the state filing the detainer for a future trial. Thus, the majority opinion argued that its decision would avoid creating a "Catch 2254", a portmanteau of Catch-22 and 28 U.S.C. § 2254, the statute authorizing federal courts to grant writs of habeas corpus to prisoners in state custody.

=== Concurrence ===
Associate Justice Harry Blackmun's short concurrence cautioned that since the 1940s, the Supreme Court has significantly expanded opportunities to petition for habeas corpus. Additionally, Blackmun highlighted the irony of Braden staking his right to a speedy trial, given that when Kentucky indicted him in 1967, the state paid for his transfer from custody in California, only for Braden to escape before standing trial. While evading Kentucky authorities, Braden was arrested for unrelated charges in Alabama, resulting in the circumstances of this case.

=== Dissent ===
Associate Justice William Rehnquist's dissent criticized modifications to the statutory interpretation of Ahrens v. Clark, given that Congress could have amended 28 U.S.C. § 2241 in the intervening 25 years, yet it chose not to. Additionally, the dissent critiqued the majority's reference to Peyton v. Rowe as irrelevant because whereas that case dealt with challenging the later portions of concurrent prison sentences, Braden was petitioning for habeas corpus regarding a trial yet to occur.

Furthermore, Rehnquist highlighted that in the 1886 case Ex parte Royall, the Supreme Court ruled that federal courts have discretion in granting habeas corpus petitions because federalism dictates that defendants should exhaust all state judicial remedies before seeking federal intervention. Thus, the dissent argued that even though Braden had petitioned Kentucky state courts for a speedy trial, he would still need to wait until his trial in Kentucky state court before petitioning for federal habeas corpus.

== Legacy ==
In 2004, the Supreme Court evaluated whether 28 U.S.C. § 2241 allows foreign nations held at the Guantanamo Bay detention camp, an American military installation built on land leased from Cuba in perpetuity, to petition the US District Court for the District of Columbia for federal habeas corpus. In the 1950 case Johnson v. Eisentrager, the Supreme Court ruled that German war criminals held in the American-run Landsberg Prison in Germany could not petition for habeas corpus under this statute because the camp was outside the jurisdiction of any United States District Court. However, the Supreme Court ultimately voted 6–3 in Rasul v. Bush, finding that Braden v. 30th Judicial Circuit Court of Kentucky allowed this District Court to consider such petitions because it could reach the federal and military authorities acting as custodians.

After the Military Commissions Act of 2006 retroactively denied military detainees the right to petition for federal habeas corpus under 28 U.S.C. § 2241, the Supreme Court ruled in Boumediene v. Bush (2008) that Guantanamo Bay detainees nonetheless retain a constitutional right to petition for federal habeas corpus under the Suspension Clause because the United States maintains de facto sovereignty over the detention camp.

== See also ==
- Ahrens v. Clark
- Johnson v. Eisentrager
- Rasul v. Bush
- List of United States Supreme Court cases, volume 410
