= Yaser Esam Hamdi =

Suspected Taliban member who got captured

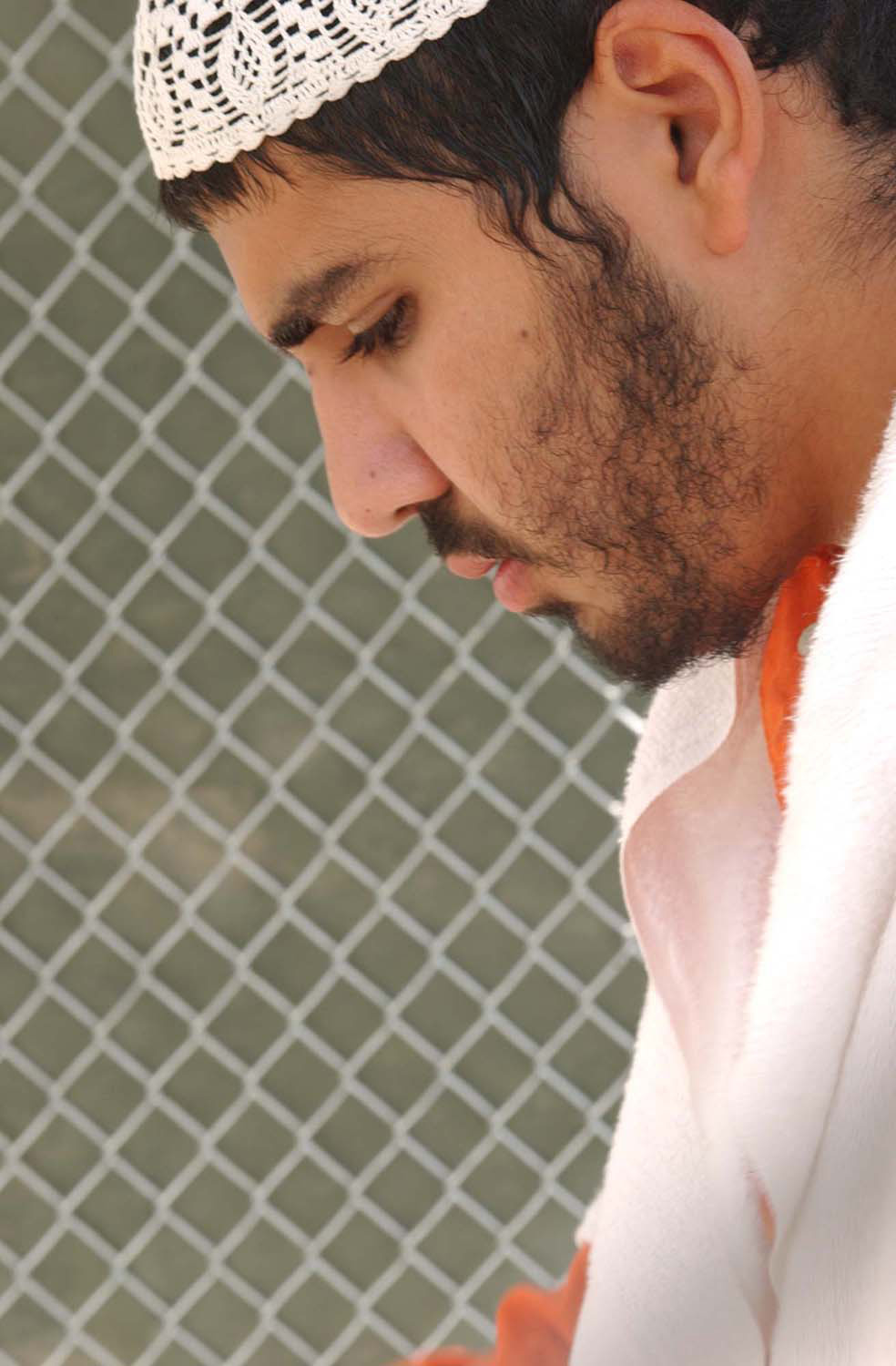
- Hamdi at Guantanamo Bay in April 2002
- Born: September 26, 1980 (age 46); Baton Rouge, Louisiana, U.S.
- Citizenship: Saudi Arabia
- Organization: Taliban
- Known for: Hamdi v. Rumsfeld; Battle of Qala-i-Jangi
- Criminal charge: None

Yaser Esam Hamdi (Arabic: ياسر عصام حمدي; born September 26, 1980) is a former American citizen who was captured in Afghanistan in 2001. The United States government claims that he was fighting with the Taliban against U.S. and Afghan Northern Alliance forces. He was declared an "illegal enemy combatant" by the Bush administration and detained for almost three years without charge. On October 9, 2004, on the condition that he renounce his U.S. citizenship and commit to travel prohibitions and other conditions, the government released him and deported him to Saudi Arabia, where he had been raised.

Hamdi was initially detained at Camp X-Ray at Guantánamo Bay, Cuba, along with eventually hundreds of other detainees. After officials learned that he was a U.S. citizen, Hamdi was transferred to military jails in Virginia and South Carolina. He continued to be detained without trial or legal representation.

Critics of his imprisonment claimed his civil rights were violated and that he was denied due process of law under the U.S. Constitution. They said his imprisonment without formal charges and denial of right to counsel was illegal.

On June 28, 2004, in Hamdi v. Rumsfeld, the United States Supreme Court upheld the U.S. government's ability to detain him indefinitely as an enemy combatant, but granted him some due process rights and the ability to contest his enemy combatant status. It said he had the right as a U.S. citizen to due process under habeas corpus: to confront his accusers and contest the grounds of detention in an impartial forum.

== Early years ==
According to his birth certificate, Hamdi was born to immigrant parents from Saudi Arabia in Baton Rouge, Louisiana, US on September 26, 1980. As a child, he moved with his parents from the United States back to Saudi Arabia, where he grew up. The Charleston Post and Courier reported that Hamdi ran away from home during the summer of 2001, when he was 20 years old, and trained at a Taliban camp. His family said that he spent only a few weeks at the camp, "where he quickly became disillusioned". He was caught up in the fighting and chaos after the United States invaded Afghanistan.

== Afghanistan ==
In late November 2001, after the United States invasion of Afghanistan, Hamdi was captured by Afghan Northern Alliance forces in Kunduz, Afghanistan, along with hundreds of surrendering Taliban fighters. All the men were sent to the Qala-e-Jangi prison complex near Mazar-i-Sharif.

Among the surrendering Taliban forces, Afghan Arabs instigated a prison riot by detonating grenades they had concealed in their clothing, attacking Northern Alliance guards and seizing weapons. The prison uprising (known as the Battle of Qala-i-Jangi) was quashed after a six-day battle, which included heavy air support from U.S. AC-130 gunships and Black Hawk helicopters. One American (Johnny Micheal Spann) was killed and nine were injured, along with about 50 Northern Alliance soldiers. Between 200 and 400 Taliban prisoners were killed during the prison uprising. Two prisoners who were American citizens, Hamdi and John Walker Lindh, were among the survivors.

Hamdi surrendered on the second day of fighting with a group of 73 surviving prisoners, after Coalition forces began flooding the underground basements where the remaining prisoners had hidden themselves. The United States officer Matthew Campbell approached him, demanding to know his origin, to which Hamdi replied "I was born in America... Baton Rouge, Louisiana, you know it, yeah?"

The United States transported Hamdi to the Guantanamo Bay detention camp and detained him there starting February 11, 2002. On April 5, the government transferred Hamdi to a jail at Naval Station Norfolk in Virginia.

Armed with a federal appeals court finding, the Bush administration refused Hamdi a lawyer until December 2003. The Pentagon announced then that Hamdi would be allowed access to legal counsel because his "intelligence value" had been exhausted and that giving him a lawyer would not harm national security. The announcement said the decision "should not be treated as a precedent" for other cases in which the government had designated U.S. citizens as "illegal enemy combatants". (José Padilla was then the only other U.S. citizen known to be imprisoned by the U.S. government as an "illegal enemy combatant").

After the decision, Frank Dunham, Hamdi's lawyer, was finally able to meet with him in February 2004, more than two years after he was incarcerated. Under Pentagon guidelines, military observers attended and recorded their meetings. Dunham was not allowed to discuss with Hamdi the conditions of his confinement. By this time, he had been transferred to the Navy Brig in Charleston, South Carolina. After the initial meeting, Hamdi was allowed to have confidential discussions with his attorneys without military observers, or video or audio taping in the room.

Hamdi's father petitioned a federal court for Hamdi's rights to know the crime(s) he is accused of, and to receive a fair trial before imprisonment. In January 2004, the U.S. Supreme Court agreed to hear Hamdi's case (Hamdi v. Rumsfeld). It ruled that U.S. citizens were entitled to the basic rights of due process protections, and rejected the administration's claim that its war-making powers overrode constitutional liberties.

== 2002 memos ==
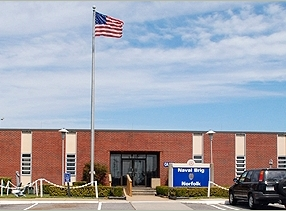
United States Navy Brig, Norfolk Virginia.

On August 1, 2002, the Office of Legal Counsel of the Department of Justice issued a memo signed by Jay S. Bybee to John A. Rizzo, Acting General Counsel of the Central Intelligence Agency regarding authorized interrogation and detention techniques for the detainees in the war on terror. It approved ten "enhanced interrogation" techniques including waterboarding.

Shortly after September 26, 2002, numerous senior government political appointees of the Bush administration flew to see the conditions of detention for Mohammed al-Kahtani and two United States citizens then held as enemy combatants: Jose Padilla and Hamdi, as a result of legal challenges to the government's detention policy. The officials included the following:

- David Addington, legal counsel to Vice-president Dick Cheney;
- Alberto Gonzales, White House Counsel and later U.S. Attorney General;
- John A. Rizzo, Acting General Counsel of the CIA;
- William Haynes II, General Counsel of the Department of Defense;
- Jack Goldsmith, legal adviser to Haynes in the Office of General Counsel, DOD;
- Alice S. Fisher, Deputy Assistant Attorney General in the Criminal Division, Department of Justice (DOJ), with responsibility for counter-terrorism efforts; and
- Patrick F. Philbin, Deputy Assistant Attorney General, Office of Legal Counsel, DOJ, who had helped develop policy related to Bush's use of military commissions to review detainees' cases;

They first flew to Camp Delta at Guantanamo to see the detainee al-Kahtani. They traveled next to Charleston, South Carolina, to view Padilla, held at the Naval Brig, and finally to Norfolk, Virginia, to view Hamdi, who was still being detained at that Naval brig.

Upon seeing Hamdi curled up in fetal position in his cell, Goldsmith wrote, "it seemed unnecessary to hold a twenty-two year old foot soldier in a remote wing of a run-down prison in a tiny cell, isolated from almost all human contact, and with no access to a lawyer".

In 2008, 91 pages of memos drafted in 2002 by officers at the Naval Consolidated Brig, Charleston, were made public under an FOIA petition. As reported by news outlets, the emails and memos described the officers' concerns for the sanity of the detainees due to the conditions of their confinements at the time, which included extended solitary confinement. The memos indicate that officers were concerned at the time that the isolation and lack of stimuli was severely affecting the mental health of Hamdi, Padilla and Ali Saleh Kahlah al-Marri, another U.S. detainee.

== U.S. Supreme Court amici curiae briefs ==
Twelve U.S. Supreme Court amici curiae briefs were filed in the Hamdi case, including nine on behalf of Hamdi and three in support of the government. Supporters of the U.S. government's position included the American Center for Law and Justice; Citizens for the Common Defence; filing jointly, the Washington Legal Foundation, U.S. Representatives Joe Barton (R–Tex.), Walter Jones (R–N.C.), and Lamar Smith (R–Tex.), and Allied Educational Foundation ; and, also filing jointly, the Center for American Unity, Friends of Immigration Law Enforcement, National Center on Citizenship and Immigration, and U.S. Representatives Dana Rohrabacher (R–Calif.), Lamar Smith, Tom Tancredo (R–Colo.), Roscoe Bartlett (R–Md.), Mac Collins (R–Ga.), Joe Barton, and Jimmy Duncan (R–Tenn.).

Some government supporters argued that he had renounced his citizenship by virtue of enlisting in a foreign army. The Center for American Unity's brief argued that Hamdi was never a United States citizen, despite his birth in the United States. They argued that the policy of birthright citizenship is based on a flawed interpretation of the Fourteenth Amendment.

On the other side, the American Bar Association; American Civil Liberties Union, American Jewish Committee, Trial Lawyers for Public Justice, and Union for Reform Judaism filing jointly; the Cato Institute; Experts on the Law of War; Certain Former Prisoners of War; Global Rights; Hon. Nathaniel R. Jones, Hon. Abner J. Mikva, Hon. William A. Norris, Hon. H. Lee Sarokin, Hon. Herbert J. Stern, Hon. Harold R. Tyler, Jr., Scott Greathead, Robert M. Pennoyer, and Barbara Paul Robinson filing jointly; International Humanitarian Organizations and Associations of International Journalists filing jointly; and a group of international law professors filing jointly submitted amici curiae briefs to the court on behalf of Hamdi.

Opponents of the U.S. government's detention without trial of U.S. citizens argued that the practice violated numerous constitutional safeguards and protections, as well as international conventions to which the United States is a signatory.

== U.S. Supreme Court decision ==
On June 28, 2004, the Supreme Court issued a decision repudiating the U.S. government's unilateral assertion of executive authority to suspend constitutional protections of individual liberty.

"An interrogation by one's captor, however effective an intelligence-gathering tool, hardly constitutes a constitutionally adequate fact-finding before a neutral decision-maker", wrote Justice Sandra Day O'Connor.

The U.S. Supreme Court opinion reasserted the rule of law in American society: "It is during our most challenging and uncertain moments that our nation's commitment to due process is most severely tested; and it is in those times that we must preserve our commitment at home to the principles for which we fight abroad." She added that the Court had "long since made clear that a state of war is not a blank check for the President when it comes to the rights of the nation's citizens".

The Supreme Court decision in Hamdi did not say that the government could not detain enemy combatants; it can detain enemy combatants for the length of hostilities. However, they must be given some sort of due process to determine their status as an enemy combatant. Although the United States Congress has recognized the Combatant Status Review Tribunal, the Pentagon's administrative procedure, the Supreme Court did not recognize it as due process.

== Legal significance ==
The Hamdi decision reaffirmed the importance of separation of powers among the branches of the government, and, in particular, the role of the judiciary in reviewing actions of the executive branch infringing the rights of citizens even in emergencies. After the American Civil War, the Supreme Court prohibited military detention of noncombatant Americans without appeal or writ of habeas corpus as long as courts were functioning; the difference with this case being that the Supreme Court waited until the war was over to decide the case. A 1948 federal law condemned the detention of Japanese-Americans without legal recourse during World War II; it prohibited the imprisonment of American citizens except pursuant to an act of Congress.

The Bush administration claimed that U.S. law does not apply to "illegal enemy combatants" and that it asserted the right to decide which U.S. citizens are "enemy combatants", ineligible for protection of their rights as enshrined in the United States Constitution.

Some legal scholars hailed the Supreme Court decision as the most important civil rights opinion in a half-century. They said that it was a dramatic reversal of the sweeping authority asserted by President Bush since the September 11, 2001 attacks.

Other scholars, but, believe the Supreme Court imprudently enhanced the Executive's power. The Supreme Court allowed the Executive to unilaterally determine that Hamdi was an enemy combatant. Further, the Supreme Court determined that the Executive was not required to provide any process when making the enemy combatant classification. The Supreme Court's only requirement was that a person classified as an enemy combatant must be provided with minimal due process. In effect, this allowed the Executive branch to lower the due process requirements on an American citizen, solely because the Executive branch claimed he was an enemy combatant.

Assessing the Hamdi decision, Habeas Corpus scholar Jared Perkins noted "By ratifying in part and 'fixing' (as Justice Scalia put it) in part the executive's action against Hamdi, the plurality participated with the executive in the usurpation of Congress's power to define the curtailment of the public's liberties. Removing this power (and, more importantly, this responsibility) from the representatives of the people seriously undermines those structural protections that Madison and others saw as the fundamental barrier to tyranny."

== Release ==
After agreeing to renounce his U.S. citizenship, Hamdi was released on October 9, 2004, without being charged and was deported to Saudi Arabia. He had to promise to comply with strict travel restrictions, which prohibited him from traveling to the United States, Israel, the West Bank and Gaza Strip, Syria, Iraq, Afghanistan, and Pakistan. Hamdi was required to notify Saudi Arabian officials if he ever plans to leave the kingdom. (Saudi Arabia uses exit visas and presumably this is how American authorities can track him if he leaves the country.) He had to promise not to sue the U.S. government over his captivity.

Saudi Arabia subsequently imprisoned Hamdi in Dammam for eight years and Ha'ir for seven years; he is due to be released in 2022. At Ha'ir he became a media specialist with the prisoner-run enterprise.

Although Hamdi renounced his U.S. citizenship, it is unclear whether the renunciation counts as "voluntary", as required by the Supreme Court's decisions in Afroyim v. Rusk (1967) and Vance v. Terrazas (1980).

== See also ==
- John Walker Lindh
- José Padilla
