= United States Navy Brig, Norfolk Virginia =

Coordinates: 36°55′48″N 76°18′12″W

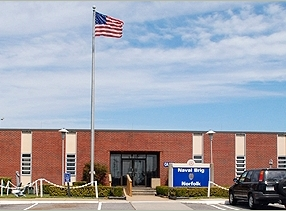
United States Navy Brig, Norfolk Virginia

The United States Navy Brig, Norfolk Virginia was one of the United States Navy's detention facilities. It had a capacity to hold 145 prisoners.

Notable inmates included Yaser Esam Hamdi, captured in Afghanistan, then transferred to the Guantanamo Bay detention camps, in Cuba, who was transferred to Norfolk when it was realized he was an American citizen.

The Brig was closed and its prisoners and staff moved to the Consolidated Navy Brig in Chesapeake, Virginia. The Norfolk Brig facility was subsequently demolished.
