= List of United States Supreme Court cases, volume 212 =

Supreme Court of the United States
- Interactive map of Supreme Court of the United States
- 38°53′26″N 77°00′16″W
- Established: March 4, 1789; 236 years ago<
- Location: Washington, D.C.
- Coordinates: 38°53′26″N 77°00′16″W
- Composition method: Presidential nomination with Senate confirmation
- Authorised by: Constitution of the United States, Art. III, § 1
- Judge term length: life tenure, subject to impeachment and removal
- Number of positions: 9 (by statute)
- Website: supremecourt.gov

This is a list of cases reported in volume 212 of United States Reports, decided by the Supreme Court of the United States in 1909.

== Justices of the Supreme Court at the time of volume 212 U.S. ==
The Supreme Court is established by Article III, Section 1 of the Constitution of the United States, which says: "The judicial Power of the United States, shall be vested in one supreme Court . . .". The size of the Court is not specified; the Constitution leaves it to Congress to set the number of justices. Under the Judiciary Act of 1789 Congress originally fixed the number of justices at six (one chief justice and five associate justices). Since 1789 Congress has varied the size of the Court from six to seven, nine, ten, and back to nine justices (always including one chief justice).

When the cases in volume 212 were decided the Court comprised the following nine members:

| Portrait | Justice | Office | Home State | Succeeded | Date confirmed by the Senate (Vote) | Tenure on Supreme Court |
|---|---|---|---|---|---|---|
| | Melville Fuller | Chief Justice | Illinois | Morrison Waite | July 20, 1888 (41–20) | October 8, 1888 – July 4, 1910 (Died) |
| | John Marshall Harlan | Associate Justice | Kentucky | David Davis | November 29, 1877 (Acclamation) | December 10, 1877 – October 14, 1911 (Died) |
| | David Josiah Brewer | Associate Justice | Kansas | Stanley Matthews | December 18, 1889 (53–11) | January 6, 1890 – March 28, 1910 (Died) |
| | Edward Douglass White | Associate Justice | Louisiana | Samuel Blatchford | February 19, 1894 (Acclamation) | March 12, 1894 – December 18, 1910 (Continued as chief justice) |
| | Rufus W. Peckham | Associate Justice | New York | Howell Edmunds Jackson | December 9, 1895 (Acclamation) | January 6, 1896 – October 24, 1909 (Died) |
| | Joseph McKenna | Associate Justice | California | Stephen Johnson Field | January 21, 1898 (Acclamation) | January 26, 1898 – January 5, 1925 (Retired) |
| | Oliver Wendell Holmes Jr. | Associate Justice | Massachusetts | Horace Gray | December 4, 1902 (Acclamation) | December 8, 1902 – January 12, 1932 (Retired) |
| | William R. Day | Associate Justice | Ohio | George Shiras Jr. | February 23, 1903 (Acclamation) | March 2, 1903 – November 13, 1922 (Retired) |
| | William Henry Moody | Associate Justice | Massachusetts | Henry Billings Brown | December 12, 1906 (Acclamation) | December 17, 1906 – November 20, 1910 (Retired) |

== Citation style ==
Under the Judiciary Act of 1789 the federal court structure at the time comprised District Courts, which had general trial jurisdiction; Circuit Courts, which had mixed trial and appellate (from the US District Courts) jurisdiction; and the United States Supreme Court, which had appellate jurisdiction over the federal District and Circuit courts—and for certain issues over state courts. The Supreme Court also had limited original jurisdiction (i.e., in which cases could be filed directly with the Supreme Court without first having been heard by a lower federal or state court). There were one or more federal District Courts and/or Circuit Courts in each state, territory, or other geographical region.

The Judiciary Act of 1891 created the United States Courts of Appeals and reassigned the jurisdiction of most routine appeals from the district and circuit courts to these appellate courts. The Act created nine new courts that were originally known as the "United States Circuit Courts of Appeals." The new courts had jurisdiction over most appeals of lower court decisions. The Supreme Court could review either legal issues that a court of appeals certified or decisions of court of appeals by writ of certiorari.

Bluebook citation style is used for case names, citations, and jurisdictions.

- "# Cir." = United States Court of Appeals
  - e.g., "3d Cir." = United States Court of Appeals for the Third Circuit
- "C.C.D." = United States Circuit Court for the District of . . .
  - e.g.,"C.C.D.N.J." = United States Circuit Court for the District of New Jersey
- "D." = United States District Court for the District of . . .
  - e.g.,"D. Mass." = United States District Court for the District of Massachusetts
- "E." = Eastern; "M." = Middle; "N." = Northern; "S." = Southern; "W." = Western
  - e.g.,"C.C.S.D.N.Y." = United States Circuit Court for the Southern District of New York
  - e.g.,"M.D. Ala." = United States District Court for the Middle District of Alabama
- "Ct. Cl." = United States Court of Claims
- The abbreviation of a state's name alone indicates the highest appellate court in that state's judiciary at the time.
  - e.g.,"Pa." = Supreme Court of Pennsylvania
  - e.g.,"Me." = Supreme Judicial Court of Maine

== List of cases in volume 212 U.S. ==
| Case Name | Page and year | Opinion of the Court | Concurring opinion(s) | Dissenting opinion(s) | Lower Court | Disposition |
|---|---|---|---|---|---|---|
| City of Knoxville v. Knoxville Water Company | 1 (1909) | Moody | none | none | C.C.E.D. Tenn. | reversed |
| Willcox v. Consolidated Gas Company | 19 (1909) | Peckham | none | none | C.C.S.D.N.Y. | reversed |
| Rakes v. United States | 55 (1909) | Fuller | none | none | W.D. Va. | dismissed |
| Presidio County v. Noel Young Bond and Stock Company | 58 (1909) | Harlan | none | none | 5th Cir. | affirmed |
| Moyer v. Peabody | 78 (1909) | Holmes | none | none | C.C.D. Colo. | affirmed |
| Waters Pierce Oil Company v. Texas I | 86 (1909) | Day | none | none | Tex. Civ. App. | affirmed |
| Waters Pierce Oil Company v. Texas II | 112 (1909) | Day | none | none | Tex. Civ. App. | dismissed |
| Palmer v. Texas | 118 (1909) | Day | none | none | 5th Cir. | affirmed |
| Louisville and Nashville Railroad Company v. Central Stock Yards Company | 132 (1909) | Holmes | none | McKenna | Ky. | reversed |
| Ontario Land Company v. Yordy | 152 (1909) | Brewer | none | none | Wash. | affirmed |
| Waters Pierce Oil Company v. Deselms | 159 (1909) | White | none | none | Sup. Ct. Terr. Okla. | affirmed |
| Crawford v. United States | 183 (1909) | Peckham | none | none | D.C. Cir. | reversed |
| Spreckels v. Brown | 208 (1909) | Holmes | none | none | Sup. Ct. Terr. Haw. | affirmed |
| Standard Oil Company v. Anderson | 215 (1909) | Moody | none | none | 2d Cir. | affirmed |
| Continental Wall Paper Company v. L. Voight and Sons Company | 227 (1909) | Harlan | none | Holmes; Brewer | 6th Cir. | affirmed |
| United States v. Marvin | 275 (1909) | per curiam | none | none | Ct. Cl. | affirmed |
| Thomas v. Texas | 278 (1909) | Fuller | none | none | Tex. Crim. App. | affirmed |
| Johnson v. Mueser | 283 (1909) | Fuller | none | none | D.C. Cir. | dismissed |
| E.C. Atkins and Company v. Moore | 285 (1909) | Fuller | none | none | D.C. Cir. | dismissed |
A court of appeals decision regarding trademark registration affirming the Commissioner of Patent's decision, and directing the clerk to certify its opinion to the Commissioner, is not final and appealable to the Supreme Court.
| Laurel Oil and Gas Company v. Morrison | 291 (1909) | Fuller | none | none | 8th Cir. | dismissed |
| Juragua Iron Company v. United States | 297 (1909) | Harlan | none | none | Ct. Cl. | affirmed |
| American Express Company v. Mullins | 311 (1909) | Brewer | none | none | Ky. Cir. Ct. | reversed |
| Nielsen v. Oregon | 315 (1909) | Brewer | none | none | Or. | reversed |
| Hammond Packing Company v. Arkansas | 322 (1909) | White | none | none | Ark. | affirmed |
| The Folmina | 354 (1909) | White | none | none | 2d Cir. | certification |
| Fritzlen v. Boatmen's Bank | 364 (1909) | White | none | none | Kan. | affirmed |
| In re Dunn | 374 (1909) | Peckham | none | none | C.C.N.D. Tex. | mandamus denied |
| Bradford v. Morrison | 389 (1909) | Peckham | none | none | Sup. Ct. Terr. Ariz. | affirmed |
| Harten v. Löffler | 397 (1909) | Peckham | none | none | D.C. Cir. | affirmed |
| North Shore Boom and Driving Company v. Nicomen Boom Company | 406 (1909) | Peckham | none | none | Wash. | dismissed |
| Louisiana Railroad Commission v. Cumberland Telephone and Telegraph Company | 414 (1909) | Peckham | none | none | C.C.E.D. La. | reversed |
| McDaniel v. Traylor | 428 (1909) | McKenna | none | none | C.C.E.D. Ark. | affirmed |
| Greenameyer v. Coate | 434 (1909) | McKenna | none | none | Sup. Ct. Terr. Okla. | affirmed |
| Grant Shoe Company v. W.M. Laird Company | 445 (1909) | Holmes | none | none | W.D.N.Y. | affirmed |
| Cariño v. Philippines | 449 (1909) | Holmes | none | none | Phil. | reversed |
| Santos v. Holy Roman Catholic and Apostolic Church | 463 (1909) | Holmes | none | none | Phil. | affirmed |
| The Eugene F. Moran | 466 (1909) | Holmes | none | none | 2d Cir. | certification |
| Bagley v. General Fire Extinguisher Company | 477 (1909) | Holmes | none | none | 2d Cir. | dismissed |
| New York Central Railroad Company v. United States I | 481 (1909) | Day | none | none | C.C.S.D.N.Y. | affirmed |
| New York Central Railroad Company v. United States II | 500 (1909) | Day | none | none | C.C.S.D.N.Y. | affirmed |
| United States v. New York Central Railroad Company | 509 (1909) | Day | none | none | C.C.S.D.N.Y. | reversed |
| Mullan v. United States | 516 (1909) | Day | none | none | Ct. Cl. | affirmed |
| American Express Company v. United States | 522 (1909) | Day | none | none | C.C.N.D. Ill. | affirmed |
| Texas and Pacific Railroad Company v. Bourman | 536 (1909) | Moody | none | none | 5th Cir. | reversed |
| Toy Toy v. Hopkins | 542 (1909) | Fuller | none | none | C.C.W.D. Wash. | affirmed |

== See also ==
- Certificate of division
