= Frank Dunham Jr. =

American lawyer

Frank W. Dunham Jr. (c. 1942 – November 3, 2006, in Alexandria, Virginia) was a federal public defender who represented a number of high profile defendants, including Zacarias Moussaoui, the only person charged and convicted after the September 11, 2001 attacks.

== Education and early career ==
Dunham was a graduate of Virginia Tech and the Columbus School of Law at The Catholic University of America. He had been a federal prosecutor and defense lawyer in Northern Virginia before becoming the federal public defender for the Eastern District of Virginia in 2001.

== Legal ==
Dunham was instrumental in the federal government's release of Yaser Esam Hamdi. By the time Moussaoui went to trial in early 2006, Dunham was too ill to participate in the case.

== Death ==
Dunham died on November 3, 2006, in his home in Alexandria, Virginia; the cause was brain cancer. Dunham was married to his wife Elinor, and had two sons and one grandson.
