= Rasul v. Bush =

- Supreme Court of the United States

Argued April 20, 2004 Decided June 28, 2004
- Full case name: Shafiq Rasul, et al., Petitioners v. George W. Bush, President of the United States, et al.; Fawzi Khalid Abdullah Fahad al Odah, et al., Petitioners v. United States, et al.
- Citations: 542 U.S. 466 (more) 124 S. Ct. 2686; 159 L. Ed. 2d 548; 2004 U.S. LEXIS 4760; 72 U.S.L.W. 4596; 2004 Fla. L. Weekly Fed. S 457

Case history
- Prior: Al Odah v. United States, 321 F.3d 1134 (D.C. Cir. 2003); cert. granted, 540 U.S. 1003 (2003).

Holding
- The degree of control exercised by the United States over the Guantanamo Bay base is sufficient to trigger the application of habeas corpus rights. The right to habeas corpus can be exercised in all dominions under the sovereign's control.

Court membership
- Chief Justice William Rehnquist Associate Justices John P. Stevens · Sandra Day O'Connor; Antonin Scalia · Anthony Kennedy; David Souter · Clarence Thomas; Ruth Bader Ginsburg · Stephen Breyer

Case opinions
- Majority: Stevens, joined by O'Connor, Souter, Ginsburg, Breyer
- Concurrence: Kennedy (in judgment)
- Dissent: Scalia, joined by Rehnquist, Thomas

Rasul v. Bush, 542 U.S. 466 (2004), is a landmark decision of the United States Supreme Court in which the Court held that foreign nationals held in the Guantanamo Bay detention camp could petition federal courts for writs of habeas corpus to review the legality of their detention. The Court's 6–3 judgment on June 28, 2004, reversed a D.C. Circuit decision which had held that the judiciary has no jurisdiction to hear any petitions from foreign nationals held in Guantanamo Bay.

The lead petitioner, British citizen Shafiq Rasul, was one of the Tipton Three. The U.S. transported the three men to the United Kingdom in March 2004 before the decision was handed down, and the government released them the next day.

== Background ==
=== Military order ===
On September 14, 2001, Congress passed the Authorization for Use of Military Force Against Terrorists, giving the President of the United States broad powers to prosecute a "War on Terror" in response to the September 11 attacks. Secretary of State Colin Powell and State Department Legal Advisor William Howard Taft IV advised that the President must observe the Geneva Conventions. Colonel Lawrence Morris proposed holding public hearings modeled on the Nuremberg trials. Major General Thomas Romig, the Judge Advocate General of the United States Army, recommended any new military tribunals be modeled on existing courts-martial.

However, Assistant Attorney General for the Office of Legal Counsel Jay Bybee, relying on the unitary executive theory developed by Deputy Assistant Attorney General John Yoo, advised the President in a series of memos that he could hold enemy combatants abroad, indefinitely, without Congressional oversight, and free from judicial review. On November 13, 2001, President George W. Bush signed a military order titled the Detention, Treatment, and Trial of Certain Non-Citizens in the War Against Terrorism, which sought to detain and try enemy combatants by military commissions under Presidential authority alone.

=== Capture and detainment ===
The various plaintiffs were taken to Guantanamo Bay for different reasons, but were generally captured or arrested during the United States invasion of Afghanistan.

The U.S. military transferred Rasul and Asif Iqbal, both British citizens, and David Hicks, an Australian citizen, to Guantanamo Bay in December 2001. Each denied voluntarily joining any terrorist forces. As noted by the District Court, they did not deny having fought for the Taliban, but claimed that if they did take up arms, it was only when being attacked and in self-defense. Rasul and Iqbal say they were with the Taliban because they were taken captive. Hicks is silent on the matter in court filings, but his father, in filing the brief, said that he believed that his son had joined the Taliban forces.

The twelve Kuwaitis, combined in Al Odah v. United States, claimed that they were in Pakistan and Afghanistan giving humanitarian aid. They were seized by villagers seeking bounties and "sold" to the United States (US) forces. The US transferred them to Guantanamo Bay starting in January 2002.

Mamdouh Habib, the plaintiff in Habib v. Bush, was arrested by Pakistani authorities on October 5, 2001, two days before the fighting began.

== Procedural history ==
=== Court petitions ===
The Center for Constitutional Rights (CCR) was the first organization to file two petitions, Rasul v. Bush and Habib v. Bush, challenging the U.S. government's practice of holding foreign nationals in detention indefinitely who were captured in Afghanistan during the war against the Taliban regime and al-Qaida. The government had designated the detainees as enemy combatants and did not allow them access to counsel, the right to a trial, or knowledge of the charges against them.

On February 19, 2002, Guantanamo detainee Shafiq Rasul, a British citizen, petitioned in federal court for a writ of habeas corpus to review the legality of his detention. Guantanamo detainee Mamdouh Habib, an Australian citizen, also filed a petition.

These cases were each filed in the United States District Court for the District of Columbia and the court decided them together, consolidating them under Rasul v. Bush. Each of the filings alleged that the government had not allowed the detainee to speak at all to friends, family or lawyers, and had not given him any hearing whatsoever on the question of whether he was an enemy combatant in the war.

=== U.S. District Court ===
U.S. District Judge Colleen Kollar-Kotelly denied the detainees' petitions on July 30, 2002, finding that aliens in Cuba had no access to U.S. courts.

Citing Johnson v. Eisentrager, 339 U.S. 763 (1950), in which the U.S. Supreme Court ruled that U.S. courts had no jurisdiction over German war criminals held in a U.S.-administered German prison, the District Court ruled that U.S. courts have jurisdiction only in a territory where the U.S. has sovereignty. Because the lease with Cuba regarding Guantanamo Bay stated that Cuba technically has "ultimate sovereignty", the court held Guantanamo Bay could not be considered a sovereign territory of the United States and therefore foreign nationals could not be given a trial in the U.S. The plaintiffs pointed out that the U.S. has all effective powers in the area.

=== U.S. Court of Appeals ===
In Al Odah v. United States a panel of the United States Court of Appeals for the District of Columbia Circuit including Judge A. Raymond Randolph, Judge Merrick Garland, and Judge Stephen F. Williams affirmed on March 11, 2003.

== Supreme Court ==
The Supreme Court of the United States, over the Government's objections, agreed in November 2003 to hear the cases of the Guantánamo detainees, namely Rasul v. Bush, which was consolidated with al Odah v. Bush (the latter represented twelve Kuwaiti men).

=== Release of Rasul and Iqbal ===
On March 9, 2004, two years after they were first detained, the U.S. released Rasul and Iqbal to the United Kingdom with no charges filed, along with three other British citizen detainees. The British government had been pressing the United States for the return of its citizens and legal residents. The next day, the UK government released all five men without charge.

=== Oral arguments ===
One-hour of oral arguments were heard on April 20, where former-Circuit Chief Judge John Joseph Gibbons appeared for the detainees and Theodore Olson, the Solicitor General of the United States, appeared for the Government.

During the oral arguments the following points came up:

- Many of the Justices' questions indicated a belief that Johnson v. Eisentrager was immaterial to the jurisdictional question at hand, while the government argued that it was material. Justice Stevens noted that the Ahrens v. Clark decision, the basis of the Eisentrager decision, had since been largely reversed in Braden v. 30th Judicial Circuit Court of Kentucky (1973), and thus relevant parts of Eisentrager may no longer apply.
- Justice Souter noted that the ability of a U.S. citizen to get a trial may necessarily imply that the court has jurisdiction in that geographic area, since jurisdiction is largely a geographic and sovereignty matter. Since the government had said it would not challenge 'habeas corpus' by a U.S. citizen in Guantanamo Bay, in Hamdi v. Rumsfeld (2004), this could establish jurisdiction at the base.
- The court had concern that there is a gray area where certain types of cases would fall through the cracks, because only the U.S. military appeared to have jurisdiction. On the other hand, Justice Scalia noted, it may be possible, and better, for Congress to remedy that situation, as they have deliberative powers the court does not.

==== Quotes ====
Justice Scalia regarding the purpose of jurisdiction:

The Constitution requires jurisdiction—the Constitution requires that an American citizen who has the protection of the Constitution have some manner of vindicating his rights under the Constitution.

Justice Breyer on whether to deny jurisdiction to citizens outside the U.S.

So what I'm thinking now, assuming that it's very hard to interpret Eisentrager, is that if we go with you, it has a virtue of clarity. There is a clear rule. Not a citizen outside the United States; you don't get your foot in the door. But against you is that same fact. It seems rather contrary to an idea of a constitution with three branches that the executive would be free to do whatever they want, whatever they want without a check.

Justice Scalia on whether the courts or Congress are better suited to rewrite laws:

Can we hold hearings to determine the problems that are bothering you? I mean, we have to take your word for what the problems are. We can't call witnesses and see what the real problems are, can we, in creating this new, substantive rule that we're going to let the courts create? Congress could do all that, though, couldn't it? ...

If it wanted to change the habeas statute, it could make all sorts of refined modifications about issues that we know nothing whatever about because we have only lawyers before us, we have no witnesses, we have no cross-examination, we have no investigative staff. And we should be the ones, Justice Breyer suggests, to draw up this reticulated system to preserve our military from intervention by the courts.

=== Opinion of the Court ===
On June 28, 2004, the Supreme Court of the United States decided against the Government. Justice John Paul Stevens, joined by Justices Sandra Day O'Connor, David Souter, Ruth Bader Ginsburg, and Stephen Breyer, held that the detainees had a statutory right to petition federal courts for habeas review.

That same day, the Supreme Court ruled against the Government in Hamdi v. Rumsfeld. Justice Sandra Day O'Connor wrote the four justice plurality opinion finding that an American citizen detained in Guantanamo had a constitutional right to petition federal courts for habeas review under the Due Process Clause.

Quoting Lord Mansfield and William Blackstone, Justice Stevens reasoned that common law courts exercise habeas jurisdiction over all dominions under the sovereign's control.

=== Justice Kennedy's concurrence in judgment ===
Justice Anthony Kennedy concurred only in the judgment. While refusing to join the majority's opinion's view of "automatic statutory authority", Justice Kennedy felt federal-court jurisdiction is permitted, "in light of the status of Guantanamo Bay and the indefinite pretrial detention of detainees".

=== Justice Scalia's dissent ===
Justice Antonin Scalia, joined by Chief Justice William Rehnquist, and Justice Clarence Thomas, filed a dissenting opinion. Attacking the majority's statutory interpretation Justice Scalia wrote, "for this Court to create such a monstrous scheme in time of war, and in frustration of our military commanders' reliance upon clearly stated prior law, is judicial adventurism of the worst sort."

== Subsequent developments ==
The United States Government announced that it planned to charge Hicks and Habib before a military commission. Habib was released in January 2005, after the Washington Post reported his extraordinary rendition from Pakistan to Egypt by the CIA soon after his arrest. He was held and tortured in Egypt for five months before being returned to Pakistan, and then transferred to military custody and Guantanamo Bay.

=== Justice Rutledge's influence ===
Directly after law school, John Paul Stevens worked as a law clerk to Justice Wiley Blount Rutledge. In Ahrens v. Clark (1948), the Court held that no federal court had been given territorial jurisdiction over Ellis Island, provoking Justice Rutledge to file a dissent Stevens helped draft.

In 1956, Stevens wrote a book chapter where he quoted Justice Rutledge's dissent from In re Tomoyuki Yamashita (1946): "It is not too early, it is never too early, for the nation to steadfastly follow its great constitutional traditions, none older or more universally protective against unbridled power than due process of law in the trial and punishment of men, this is, of all men, whether citizens, aliens, alien enemies or enemy belligerents. It can become too late."

Justice Stevens quoted the Ahrens dissent approvingly in Rasul, fifty-six years after he had drafted it as a clerk.

=== Hamdan v. Rumsfeld (2006) ===
Deputy Defense Secretary Paul Wolfowitz responded by creating "Combatant Status Review Tribunals" to determine if detainees were unlawful combatants. Detainee's habeas petitions to the United States District Court for the District of Columbia were consolidated into two cases. In one, Judge Richard J. Leon rejected the detainees petition because they "have no cognizable Constitutional rights" on January 19, 2005. In the other, Judge Joyce Hens Green granted the detainees petition, finding the CSRTs were insufficient to protect the detainees rights under the Geneva Convention and the Fifth Amendment to the United States Constitution on January 31, 2005.

On July 15, 2005, a panel of the D.C. Circuit made of Judge A. Raymond Randolph then-Circuit Judge John Roberts and Judge Stephen F. Williams vacated the lower rulings and threw out the detainees' petitions. On November 7, 2005, the Supreme Court agreed to review that judgment. On December 30, 2005, Congress responded by passing the Detainee Treatment Act, which changed the statute to explicitly strip detainees of any right to petition courts for habeas review.

On June 29, 2006, the Supreme Court decided against the Government in Hamdan v. Rumsfeld. Justice Stevens, writing for a five justice majority, found that courts had jurisdiction to hear those detainees' petitions which had been filed before Congress enacted the DTA and that the CSRTs violated the Geneva Conventions standards enacted in the Uniform Code of Military Justice.

=== Boumediene v. Bush (2008) ===
Congress responded by passing the Military Commissions Act of 2006, which gave statutory authorization to the CSRTs and was explicit in retroactively stripping detainees of any right to petition courts for habeas review. On February 20, 2007, D.C. Circuit Judge A. Raymond Randolph, joined by Judge David B. Sentelle upheld the Act and dismissed the detainees' petitions, over the dissent of Judge Judith W. Rogers.

On June 12, 2008, the U.S. Supreme Court decided against the Government in Boumediene v. Bush. Justice Anthony Kennedy, writing for a five justice majority, held that the detainees had a right to petition federal courts for writs of habeas corpus under the United States Constitution. Justice Antonin Scalia strongly dissented, writing that the Court's decision, "will almost certainly cause more Americans to be killed".

== See also ==
- Johnson v. Eisentrager (1950)
- Hamdi v. Rumsfeld (2004)
- Rumsfeld v. Padilla
- Boumediene v. Bush (2008) and Al Odah v. United States (consolidated)
- Munaf v. Geren (2008)
- List of United States Supreme Court cases, volume 542
- List of United States Supreme Court cases
- Ex parte Milligan
- Ex parte Quirin
