= List of United States Supreme Court cases, volume 410 =

This is a list of all the United States Supreme Court cases from volume 410 of the United States Reports:

Case name	Citation	Date decided
United States v. Dionisio	410 U.S. 1	1973
United States v. Mara	410 U.S. 19	1973
United States v. Glaxo Group Ltd.	410 U.S. 52	1973
EPA v. Mink	410 U.S. 73	1973
Roe v. Wade	410 U.S. 113	1973
Doe v. Bolton	410 U.S. 179	1973
United States v. Fla. E. Coast R.R. Co.	410 U.S. 224	1973
United States v. Chandler	410 U.S. 257	1973
McGinnis v. Royster	410 U.S. 263	1973
Chambers v. Mississippi	410 U.S. 284	1973
Mahan v. Howell	410 U.S. 315	1973
Tacon v. Arizona	410 U.S. 351	1973
Lehnhausen v. Lake Shore Auto Parts Co.	410 U.S. 356	1973
Otter Tail Power Co. v. United States	410 U.S. 366	1973
United States v. Enmons	410 U.S. 396	1973
Michigan v. Ohio	410 U.S. 420	1973
Morris v. Weinberger	410 U.S. 422	1973
Dept. of Motor Vehicles v. Rios	410 U.S. 425	1973
Tillman v. Wheaton-Haven Recreation Ass'n, Inc.	410 U.S. 431	1973
United States v. Basye	410 U.S. 441	1973
Illinois v. Somerville	410 U.S. 458	1973
Braden v. 30th Judicial Circuit Court of Kentucky	410 U.S. 484	1973
Brennan v. Arnheim & Neely, Inc.	410 U.S. 512	1973
United States v. Falstaff Brewing Corp.	410 U.S. 526	1973
United States v. First Nat'l Bancorporation, Inc.	410 U.S. 577	1973
Hurtado v. United States	410 U.S. 578	1973
Bradley v. United States	410 U.S. 605	1973
Linda R.S. v. Richard D.	410 U.S. 614	1973
United Air Lines, Inc. v. Mahin	410 U.S. 623	1973
Ohio v. Kentucky	410 U.S. 641	1973
Ortwein v. Schwab	410 U.S. 656	1973
Papish v. Univ. of Mo.	410 U.S. 667	1973
Marston v. Lewis	410 U.S. 679	1973
Burns v. Fortson	410 U.S. 686	1973
LaVallee v. Delle Rose	410 U.S. 690	1973
Texas v. Louisiana	410 U.S. 702	1973
Salyer Land Co. v. Tulare Lake Basin Water Storage Dist.	410 U.S. 719	1973
Associated Enterprises, Inc. v. Toltec Watershed Improvement Dist.	410 U.S. 743	1973
Rosario v. Rockefeller	410 U.S. 752	1973
Alexander v. Gardner-Denver Co.	410 U.S. 925	1973
