= Jane C. Sherburne =

American lawyer

Jane Sherburne
- Education: University of Minnesota (BA, MSW); Georgetown University (JD)
- Political party: Democratic

Jane C. Sherburne is an American lawyer who currently serves as Senior Executive Vice President and General Counsel to The Bank of New York Mellon and as a member of the Council of the Administrative Conference of the United States. Sherburne is known primarily for her experience in crisis management, her work in civil rights, and her counseling to corporate boards and major financial institutions. Sherburne was Special Counsel to President Bill Clinton and managed the White House response to ethics investigations by the Independent Counsel, most notably during the Whitewater controversy.

== Biography ==
Sherburne earned her BA from the University of Minnesota in 1974, where she went on to receive a master's degree in Social Work in 1976. Sherburne received her JD from the Georgetown University Law Center in 1983 and was Editor of The Georgetown Law Journal.

== Career ==
Sherburne began her career in the office of Congressman Donald M. Fraser (D-MN), where she focused on issues related to public welfare and income security programs. She then served as Chief of Staff to the Commissioner of the Social Security Administration, during the Carter Administration. After graduating from law school in 1983, Sherburne joined the law firm of Wilmer, Cutler & Pickering.

From 1994 through 1997, Sherburne was Special Counsel to the President in charge of managing the White House response to various ethics investigations brought by Congress and the Independent Counsel, including the Whitewater controversy and the suicide of Vince Foster. Sherburne played a prominent role representing First Lady Hillary Clinton during Ken Starr's investigation of the White House, during which he targeted Mrs. Clinton.

During her time as a partner at Wilmer, Cutler & Pickering, Sherburne focused on crisis management, including media relations, Congressional investigations, and civil litigation. She also created the first emergency child-care program in a law firm. While at Wilmer, Sherburne served as co-lead counsel in the lower-court consideration of the landmark case, Grutter v. Bollinger, representing the University of Michigan in the successful defense of its affirmative action admissions policy.

Sherburne was employed by Citigroup from 2001 through mid-2008, during which time she was Senior Deputy General Counsel, managing the company's response to major litigation and reputation risks; later, she served as General Counsel for Citigroup's Global Consumer business. Sherburne became Wachovia's chief legal officer in June 2008, guiding the company through its near collapse and eventual merger into Wells Fargo. She now serves in the same position at the Bank of New York Mellon.

She currently serves as a member of the Boards of Directors of Teledyne Technologies, Inc. and HSBC North America Holdings.

== Professional activities and awards ==
Sherburne served on the Executive Committee of the New York City Bar from 2008 to 2012 and was the 2013 recipient of the Top Corporate Counsel Award from the New York Stock Exchange.

Sherburne has been recognized for her contributions to pro bono and non-profit organizations. She serves as Chair of the National Women's Law Center Board of Directors, co-chair to the Lawyers' Committee for Civil Rights Under Law, board member for the New York Lawyers for the Public Interest and is a member of the New York Legal Aid Society. Sherburne has been honored numerous times for her pro bono work.
