= Rumsfeld v. Padilla =

- Supreme Court of the United States

Argued April 28, 2004 Decided June 28, 2004
- Full case name: Donald H. Rumsfeld, Secretary of Defense, Petitioner v. José Padilla and Donna R. Newman, as Next Friend of José Padilla
- Citations: 542 U.S. 426 (more) 124 S. Ct. 2711; 159 L. Ed. 2d 513; 2004 U.S. LEXIS 4759; 72 U.S.L.W. 4584; 2004 Fla. L. Weekly Fed. S 466

Case history
- Prior: On writ of certiorari to the United States Court of Appeals for the Second Circuit, Padilla v. Rumsfeld, 352 F.3d 695, 2003 U.S. App. LEXIS 25616 (2d Cir. 2003).
- Subsequent: Remanded for entry of an order of dismissal without prejudice, Padilla v. Hanft, 2005 U.S. Dist. LEXIS 2921 (D.S.C., Feb. 28, 2005)

Holding
- Habeas corpus petition had been improperly filed in the U.S. District Court for the Southern District of New York, and should have been filed in the U.S. District Court for the District of South Carolina; petition should have named Padilla's immediate custodian, not the Secretary of Defense.

Court membership
- Chief Justice William Rehnquist Associate Justices John P. Stevens · Sandra Day O'Connor; Antonin Scalia · Anthony Kennedy; David Souter · Clarence Thomas; Ruth Bader Ginsburg · Stephen Breyer

Case opinions
- Majority: Rehnquist, joined by O'Connor, Scalia, Kennedy, Thomas
- Concurrence: Kennedy, joined by O'Connor
- Dissent: Stevens, joined by Souter, Ginsburg, Breyer

Laws applied
- U.S. Const. art. II, U.S. Const. amend. V; 18 U.S.C. § 4001; 115 Stat. 224 (Authorization for Use of Military Force)

Rumsfeld v. Padilla, 542 U.S. 426 (2004), was a United States Supreme Court case, in which José Padilla, an American citizen, sought habeas corpus relief against Secretary of Defense Donald Rumsfeld, as a result of his detention by the military as an "unlawful combatant."

On May 8, 2002, Padilla, a U.S. citizen, flew from Pakistan to Chicago's O'Hare International Airport. As he left the plane, Padilla was apprehended by federal agents executing a material witness warrant issued by the United States District Court for the Southern District of New York in connection with its grand jury investigation into the September 11th attacks by terrorists. Initially Padilla was considered a "material witness," without charges filed and was given very limited access to legal counsel. He was later classified as an "enemy combatant," which, the George W. Bush administration claimed as justification to imprison him indefinitely, and without legal recourse or access, as with non-citizen suspects in the war on terror.

Padilla's attorney, Donna Newman, claiming to act as his next friend and on his behalf, filed a petition for habeas corpus in the United States District Court for the Southern District of New York. On December 4, 2002, the court denied the petition and held that the President of the United States, as Commander-in-Chief had the authority to designate as an "enemy combatant" an American citizen captured on American soil, and, through the Secretary of Defense, to detain him for the duration of armed conflict with Al-Qaeda.

The case was appealed to the United States Court of Appeals for the Second Circuit, which held that the President lacked the authority to order the military detentions of American citizens captured on American soil.

The case was petitioned to the United States Supreme Court. The principal issue before the Court was whether the Congressional Authorization for Use of Military Force post September 11 gave the president the powers to detain a United States citizen under military custody by classifying the detainee as an "enemy combatant." Otherwise, the president would run afoul of the Non-Detention Act, which provides that "No citizen shall be imprisoned or otherwise detained by the United States except pursuant to an Act of Congress.

The Court did not decide the issue. Instead, the Court held that the habeas corpus petition had been improperly filed. It ruled that because Padilla was being held in a brig (military prison) in South Carolina, the petition should have been filed in the United States District Court for the District of South Carolina, and it should have named the commander of the brig and the Secretary of Defense since the brig commander was Padilla's "immediate custodian". The Court reversed the decision of the United States Court of Appeals for the Second Circuit and remanded the case for dismissal without prejudice. In other words, it overruled the Court of Appeals decision and ordered the dismissal of the case, allowing Padilla to refile the petition. Thus, the principal issue of the case had not been resolved.

Paul Clement, Principal Deputy Solicitor General at the time, gave oral argument for the United States (Rumsfeld); Jenny Martinez, a law professor and human rights lawyer, gave oral argument on behalf of Padilla and Newman.

== Background ==
The case was argued only two days before the Abu Ghraib prison abuse scandal was first shown to the general public in a The New Yorker article by Seymour M. Hersh (April 30), which showed digital photos taken by guards. The story was subsequently taken up by CBS and broadcast on nationwide television.

The timing of the two events is relevant for understanding political context. Before the publicizing of incriminating photographs of abused detainees in Iraq, the US was largely dominated by a political climate in which the charge of abuse was only anecdotal and was weighed lightly compared to appeals for national security. Still, the rendered decision came after news of the scandal broke, and the degree of the Abu Ghraib case influence is speculative.

During the oral argument, Justice Ruth Bader Ginsburg asked some pointed questions of Clement, some of which directly treated the issue of abuse. An important dialogue features a comment by Deputy Solicitor General Paul Clement which denies the claim that the United States uses torture:

Justice Ginsburg
Suppose the executive says mild torture, we think, will help get this information. It's not a soldier who does something against the Code of Military Justice, but it's an executive command. Some systems do that to get information.
Clement
Well, our executive doesn't. And I think, I mean....
Justice Ginsburg
What's constraining? That's the point. Is it just up to the good will of the executive, or is there any judicial check?

== Supreme Court cases ==
- Ex Parte Milligan
- Ex Parte Quirin
- Johnson v. Eisentrager
- Hamdi v. Rumsfeld
- Rasul v. Bush

== See also ==
- List of United States Supreme Court cases, volume 542
- List of United States Supreme Court cases
