= José Padilla (criminal) =

American terrorist incarcerated in a US federal prison

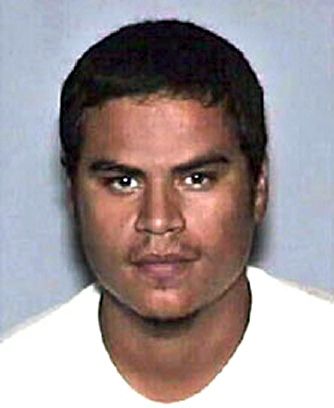
- Born: October 18, 1970 (age 56); Brooklyn, New York, United States
- Other names: Abdullah al-Muhajir; Muhajir Abdullah; José Rivera; José Alicea; José Hernandez; José Ortiz; Jose Ibrahim Padilla
- Children: 2
- Status: Released on November 12, 2026
- Criminal charge: Criminal conspiracy (multiple)
- Penalty: 17 years in prison, increased to 21 years on appeal

José Padilla (born October 18, 1970), also known as Abdullah al-Muhajir (/ɑːbˈdʌlə ɑːl mʊˈhɑːdʒɪər/ ahb-DUL-ə ahl moo-HAH-jeer) or Muhajir Abdullah, is a United States citizen who was convicted in a federal court of aiding terrorists.

Padilla was arrested in Chicago on May 8, 2002, on suspicion of plotting a radiological bomb ("dirty bomb") attack. He was detained as a material witness until June 9, 2002, when President George W. Bush designated him an enemy combatant and, arguing that he was not entitled to trial in civilian courts, had him transferred to a military prison in South Carolina. Padilla was held for three and a half years as an enemy combatant. Upon pressure and lawsuits from civil liberties groups, he was transferred to a civilian jail in 2006.

In August 2007, a federal jury found him guilty of conspiring to commit murder and fund terrorism. Government officials had earlier claimed Padilla was suspected of planning to build and explode a "dirty bomb" in the United States, but he was never charged with this crime. He was initially sentenced to 17 years in prison, which was increased on appeal to 21 years. His lawsuits against the military for allegedly torturing him were rejected by the courts for lack of merit and jurisdictional issues.

== Early life ==
José Padilla was born in Brooklyn, New York, to Estella Obregón and her husband, both of Puerto Rican descent. The family later moved to Chicago, Illinois. As a youth, Padilla joined the Latin Kings street gang and was arrested several times. During his gang years, he maintained several aliases, such as José Rivera, José Alicea, José Hernandez, and José Ortiz. As a 14-year-old juvenile, he was convicted of aggravated assault and manslaughter after a gang member, whom he had kicked in the head, died.

After serving his last jail sentence, Padilla converted to Islam after his marriage to a Muslim woman and moved to the Middle East. One of his early religious instructors was an Islamic teacher who professed a nonviolent philosophy and Padilla appeared at the time to be faithful to his mentor's teachings. While living in Fort Lauderdale, Florida, Padilla attended the Masjid Al-Iman mosque, as did Adham Amin Hassoun, "for most of the 1990s and [they] were reportedly friends."

U.S. authorities accused Hassoun of associating with radical Islamic fundamentalists, including Al-Qaeda. Hassoun, a Lebanese-born Palestinian, was arrested in 2002 for overstaying his visa and was charged in 2004 with providing material support to terrorists. By that time, Hassoun had already been charged with perjury, a weapons offense, and other offenses.

== Marriage and family ==
Broward County, Florida court records show that on July 1, 1994, Padilla changed his name to one word: "Ibrahim". He was married under that name to Cherie Maria Stultz on January 2, 1996. They divorced in March 2001, according to court records. In January 2001, she had placed an ad in a local business newspaper, serving notice that she was seeking divorce. Their divorce papers identify him as Jose Ibrahim Padilla.

Padilla married an Egyptian woman named Shamia'a, and they had two sons together. When he was arrested in 2002, the boys were infants. At his bail hearing, his wife and children were believed to be overseas.

== Terrorist activity ==
According to press reports in 2002, Padilla had been in the Afghanistan–Pakistan region in 2001 and early 2002. At the time, the Defense Department said that Abu Zubaydah, then believed to be a top al-Qaeda official, had led the US to Padilla.

Padilla was alleged to have been trained in the construction and employment of radiologic weapons – "dirty bombs" – at an al-Qaeda safe house in Lahore, Pakistan. Padilla and Binyam Mohammed, a United Kingdom resident, were alleged to have been recruited at the Lahore safe house to travel to the United States to launch terrorist attacks.

However, more recent evidence suggests that the "dirty bomb" plot was likely a ruse to get out of Pakistan and based on an internet joke website purporting to describe how to build an H-bomb by swinging buckets of uranium as fast as possible. A 2003 CIA memo notes that the satirical article "is filled with countless technical inaccuracies which would likely result in the death of anyone attempting to follow the instructions, and definitely would not result in a nuclear explosion".

== Arrest ==
Padilla traveled to Egypt, Saudi Arabia, Afghanistan, Pakistan, and Iraq. On his return, he was arrested by U.S. Customs agents at Chicago's O'Hare International Airport on May 8, 2002, and held as a material witness on a warrant issued in the state of New York stemming from the September 11, 2001, attacks.

On June 9, 2002, two days before District Court Judge Michael Mukasey was to issue a ruling on the validity of continuing to hold Padilla under the material witness warrant, President George Bush issued an order to Secretary of Defense Donald Rumsfeld to detain Padilla as an "enemy combatant." Padilla was transferred to the Naval Consolidated Brig, Charleston administered by the U.S. Navy in Charleston, South Carolina, without any notice to his attorney or family. The order "legally justified" the detention using the 2001 AUMF passed in the wake of September 11, 2001, (formally "The Authorization for Use of Military Force Joint Resolution" (Public Law 107-40)) and opined that a U.S. citizen detained on U.S. soil can be classified as an enemy combatant. (This opinion is based on the decision of the United States Supreme Court in the case of Ex parte Quirin, a case involving the detention of eight German spies operating in the United States while working for Nazi Germany during World War II.)

According to the text of the ensuing decision from the U.S. Court of Appeals for the Second Circuit, Padilla's detention as an "enemy combatant" (pursuant to the President's order) was based on the following reasons:

1. Padilla was "closely associated with al Qaeda," a designation for loosely knit insurgent groups sharing common ideals and tactics, "with which the United States is at war";
2. he had engaged in "war-like acts, including conduct in preparation for acts of international terrorism";
3. he had intelligence that could assist the United States in warding off future terrorist attacks; and
4. he was a continuing threat to American security.

== 2002 memos ==
Shortly after September 26, 2002, the top political appointees David Addington, Alberto Gonzales, John A. Rizzo, William Haynes II, two Justice Department lawyers, Alice S. Fisher and Patrick F. Philbin, and then-Special Counsel to the General Counsel of the Department of Defense Jack Goldsmith flew to Camp Delta to view Mohammed al-Kahtani, then to Charleston, South Carolina, to view Padilla, and finally to Norfolk, Virginia, to view Yaser Esam Hamdi, who had been subjected to coercive techniques including solitary confinement. It was later learned that top administration officials had earlier discussed and approved the use of "enhanced interrogation techniques", a euphemism for torture, for the CIA. They were consulting with DOD agents to discuss techniques that might be used against the detainees in military custody. Later that year, additional "harsh techniques" were used on these three and other prisoners.

In October 2008, 91 pages of memos drafted in 2002 by officers at the Naval Consolidated Brig, Charleston were made public. The memos indicate that officers were concerned that the isolation of solitary confinement and lack of stimuli were causing the prisoner Yasser Hamdi mental anguish and threatened his sanity. The memos also state that Padilla and a third prisoner, Ali Saleh Kahlah al-Marri, were held in similar conditions at the Brig.

== Habeas corpus ==
Because Padilla was being detained without any criminal charges being formally made against him, he, through his lawyer Jennifer Martínez, made a petition for a writ of habeas corpus to the United States District Court for the Southern District of New York, naming then Secretary of Defense Donald Rumsfeld as the respondent to this petition. The government filed a motion to dismiss the petition on the grounds that:

1. Padilla's lawyer was not a proper "next Friend" to sign and file the petition on Padilla's behalf.
2. Commander Marr of the South Carolina brig, and not U.S. Secretary Rumsfeld, should have been named as the respondent to the petition.
3. The New York court lacked personal jurisdiction over the named respondent Secretary Rumsfeld who resides in Virginia.

The New York District Court disagreed with the government's arguments and denied its motion. However, the court declared that President Bush had constitutional and statutory authority to designate and detain American citizens as "enemy combatants." It held that Padilla had the right to challenge his "enemy combatant" designation and detention in the course of his habeas corpus petition, although immediate release was denied. Both Padilla and the government made an interlocutory appeal to the United States Court of Appeals for the Second Circuit.

On December 18, 2003, the Second Circuit declared that

1. Padilla's lawyer is a proper "next friend" to sign and file the habeas corpus petition on Padilla's behalf because she, as a member of the bar, had a professional duty to defend her client's interests. Further, she had a significant attorney-client relationship with Padilla and was far from being some zealous "intruder" or "uninvited meddler," as described by the government.
2. Secretary Rumsfeld can be named as the respondent to Padilla's habeas corpus petition, although South Carolina's Navy Commander Marr had immediate physical custody of Padilla, because there have been past cases where national-level officials have been named as respondents to such petitions.
3. The New York District Court had personal jurisdiction over Secretary Rumsfeld although Rumsfeld resided in Virginia and not New York because New York's "long-arm statute" is applicable to Secretary Rumsfeld, who was responsible for Padilla's physical transfer from New York to South Carolina.
4. Despite the legal precedent set by ex parte Quirin, "the president lacked inherent constitutional authority as commander in chief to detain American citizens on American soil outside a zone of combat." The Second Circuit relied on the case of Youngstown Sheet & Tube Co. v. Sawyer, 343 U.S. 579 (1952), where the U.S. Supreme Court had ruled that President Truman, during the Korean War years, could not use his position and power as commander in chief, created under Article 2, Section 2, of the U.S. Constitution, to seize the nation's steel mills on the eve of a nationwide steelworkers strike. The extraordinary government power to curb civil rights and liberties during crisis periods, such as times of war, lies with Congress and not the president. Article 1, Section 9, Clause 2, of the U.S. Constitution grants Congress, and not the president, the power to suspend the right of habeas corpus during a period of rebellion or invasion.

Declaring that without clear congressional approval (per 18 U.S.C. § 4001(a)), President Bush cannot detain an American citizen arrested in the United States and away from a zone of combat as an "illegal enemy combatant", the court ordered that Padilla be released from the military brig within 30 days. However, the court stayed the release order pending the government's appeal to the U.S. Supreme Court.

=== U.S. Supreme Court ===
On February 20, 2004, the Supreme Court agreed to hear the government's appeal. The Supreme Court heard the case, Rumsfeld v. Padilla, in April 2004, but on June 28, 2004, the court dismissed the petition on technical grounds because

1. It was improperly filed in federal court in New York instead of South Carolina, where Padilla was being detained.
2. The Court held that the petition was incorrect in naming the secretary of defense as the respondent for habeas corpus purposes instead of the commanding officer of the naval brig who was Padilla's direct custodian.

=== District Court for South Carolina ===
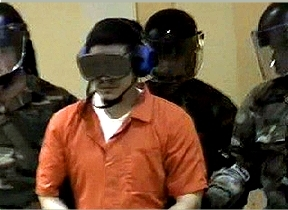
Photo of José Padilla on sensory-deprived trip to the dentist; published by the New York Times in December 2006.

The case was re-filed in the U.S. District Court for the District of South Carolina, and on February 28, 2005, the court ordered that the government either charge or release Padilla.

On June 13, 2005, the Supreme Court denied the government's petition to have his case heard directly by the court, instead of the appeal being first heard by the U.S. Court of Appeals for the Fourth Circuit in Richmond, Virginia. On September 9, 2005, a three-judge panel of the Fourth Circuit ruled that President Bush had the authority to detain Padilla without charges. An opinion written by judge J. Michael Luttig cited the joint resolution by Congress authorizing military action following the September 11, 2001, attacks, as well as the June 2004 ruling concerning Yaser Hamdi.

Attorneys for Padilla and civil liberties organizations, filing amicus curiae briefs, argued that the detention was illegal. They said it could lead to the military holding anyone, from protesters to people who check out what the government considers the wrong books from the library. The Bush administration denied the allegations. The defense argument noted that the congressional military authorization (the Authorization for Use of Military Force Against Terrorists) pertained only to nations, organizations, or persons whom the president "determines planned, authorized, committed, or aided the September 11, 2001, attacks, or harbored such organizations or persons."

They advanced a reading of this language would suggest a congressional limitation to the military power would assure an appropriately narrow range of detainees and that the power to detain would last only so long as the congressional authorization was not revoked or remained in effect by its terms. Similarly, they noted that the Yaser Hamdi Supreme Court case (Hamdi v. Rumsfeld) upon which the court relied, required a habeas corpus hearing for any alleged enemy combatant who demands one, claiming not to be such a combatant, which would require additional judicial or military tribunal oversight over each such detention. The argument in the general public concerning the legality of Padilla's detention examined one of the provisions of the Military Commissions Act of 2006 enacted on October 17, 2006, which states:

Except as otherwise provided in this chapter, and notwithstanding any other law [emphasis added] (including section 2241 of title 28, United States Code, or any other habeas corpus provision), no court, justice, or judge shall have jurisdiction to hear or consider any claim or cause of action whatsoever, including any action pending on or filed after the date of enactment of this chapter, relating to the prosecution, trial, or judgment of a military commission convened under this section, including challenges to the lawfulness of the procedures of military commissions under this chapter.

== Indictment ==
On November 22, 2005, CNN reported that Padilla had been indicted in federal court on charges he "conspired to murder, kidnap, and maim people overseas." Padilla's lawyer correlated the indictment's timing as avoidance of an impending Supreme Court hearing on the Padilla case: "The administration is seeking to avoid a Supreme Court showdown over the issue."

None of the original allegations made by the U.S. government three years prior, which had contributed to Padilla's being held the majority of the time in solitary confinement, was part of the indictment, nor was there any charge related to incidents within the United States.

Democracy Now! further asserted:

Attorney General Alberto Gonzales announced Padilla is being removed from military custody and charged with a series of crimes" and "There is no mention in the indictment of Padilla's alleged plot to use a dirty bomb in the United States. There is also no mention that Padilla ever planned to stage any attacks inside the country. And there is no direct mention of Al-Qaeda. Instead the indictment lays out a case involving five men who helped raise money and recruit volunteers in the 1990s to go overseas to countries including Chechnya, Bosnia, Somalia and Kosovo. Padilla, in fact, appears to play a minor role in the conspiracy. He is accused of going to a jihad training camp in Afghanistan but his lawyers said the indictment offers no evidence he ever engaged in terrorist activity.

Padilla was held for years in military custody with no formal charges. Critics said such a process would allow the U.S. government to detain citizens indefinitely without presenting the case that would eventually be tried.

On December 21, 2005, the U.S. Court of Appeals for the Fourth Circuit refused to authorize a transfer from the Navy brig to civil court. The court suggested that the administration was manipulating the federal court system with "intentional mooting" in order to avoid Supreme Court review. It said that the "shifting tactics in the case threatens [the government's] credibility with the courts."

The Solicitor General Paul Clement said that the federal appeals court decision "defies both law and logic." He asked the Supreme Court authorize immediate transfer on December 30, 2005. This took place one day after Padilla's lawyers filed a petition charging the president with overstepping his authority.

On January 3, 2006, the U.S. Supreme Court granted a Bush administration request to transfer Padilla from military to civilian custody. He was transferred to a federal prison in Miami while the Supreme Court decided whether to accept his appeal of the government's authority to keep US citizens it designates "enemy combatants" in open-ended military confinement without benefit of trial.

On April 3, 2006, the Supreme Court declined, with three justices dissenting from denial of certiorari, to hear Padilla's appeal from the 4th Circuit Court's decision. It left in place the 4th Circuit court's ruling that the president had the power to designate and detain him as an "enemy combatant" without charges and with disregard to habeas corpus.

== Criminal proceedings ==
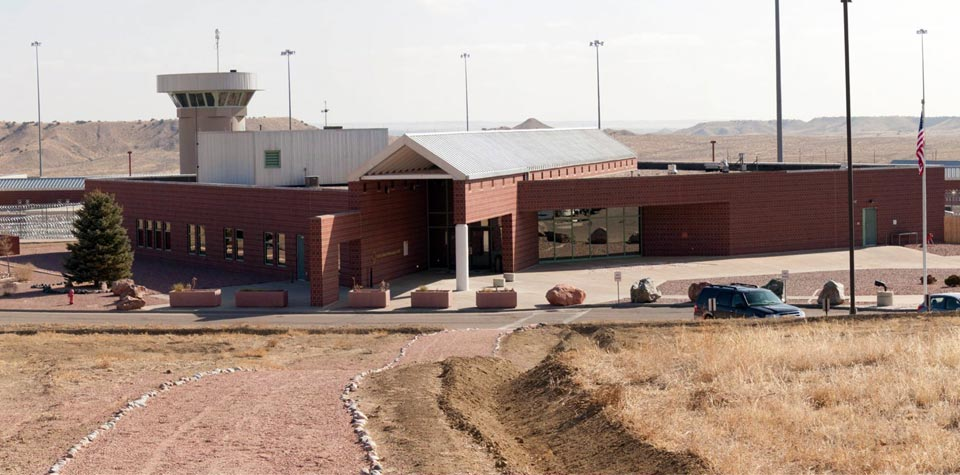
"Supermax", where Padilla was held in Florence, Colorado

Padilla was indicted on three criminal counts in the Miami, Florida, criminal proceeding. He pleaded not guilty to all charges. The trial commenced on May 15, 2007, and lasted for 3 months.

=== Partial dismissal of counts against Padilla ===
Two weeks after the presiding judge claimed prosecutors were "light on facts" in their conspiracy allegations, the government dismissed one of its three charges against Padilla and dismissed another in part.

The count of conspiracy to murder (punishable by life imprisonment) was dismissed on August 16, 2006, on the grounds that it was duplicative of the other two counts pending against him. The second count was conspiracy to materially aid terrorists under 18 U.S.C. § 371 (punishable by five years in prison) and the third was Providing material support to terrorists 18 U.S.C. § 2339A (punishable by 15 years in prison). The trial court ordered that the government elect a single criminal statute in its second count of the indictment.

However, on January 30, 2007, the Court of Appeals for the 11th Circuit reversed the ruling and reinstated a charge of conspiracy to "murder, kidnap, and maim."

=== Delays in prosecution ===
Two additional motions filed in October 2006 argued that the case should be dismissed because the government took too much time between arresting Padilla and charging him, violating Padilla's constitutional right to a speedy trial as the arrest took place prior to his detention as an enemy combatant and not when he was transferred to civilian custody.

=== Mental competency hearing ===
In January 2007, a mental competency hearing was scheduled for Padilla for February 22, 2007. Two mental health experts hired by the defense to conduct a competency evaluation concluded Padilla was not mentally fit for trial; a third evaluation submitted by the Bureau of Prisons found him mentally competent. The judge ordered that Sandy Seymour, technical director of the Charleston brig; Craig Noble, brig psychologist; Andrew Cruz, brig social worker; four employees of the Miami federal detention center; and a Defense Department lawyer appear at the hearing.

On February 22, 2007, at the competency hearing, Dr. Angela Hegarty, a psychiatrist hired by Padilla's defense, said that after 22 hours of examining Padilla, she believed that he was mentally unfit to stand trial. She said he exhibited "a facial tic, problems with social contact, lack of concentration and a form of Stockholm syndrome." She diagnosed his condition as post-traumatic stress disorder (PTSD) and told the court, "It's my opinion that he lacks the capacity to assist counsel. He has a great deal of difficulty talking about the current case before him."

In cross examination, federal prosecutor John Shipley noted that Padilla had a score of zero on Hegarty's post-traumatic stress disorder test and pointed out that this information was omitted in her final report. Hegarty stated that the omission was an error on her part. Another psychiatrist hired by the defense testified along the same lines. The Miami Herald reported that a "U.S. Bureau of Prisons psychiatrist who believes Padilla is fit to face trial and Defense Department officials—are expected to testify at the ongoing hearing before U.S. District Judge Marcia Cooke."

=== Conviction and sentencing ===
On August 16, 2007, after a day and a half of deliberations, the jury found Padilla guilty on all counts. He was scheduled to be sentenced on December 5, 2007, but his sentencing was postponed to January due to the death of a family member of the judge scheduled to sentence him. He was sentenced on January 22, 2008, to 17 years and 4 months in federal prison. His two co-defendants received sentences of 15 years, eight months, and 12 years and 8 months.

Before receiving his permanent prison assignment, Padilla was placed in the Federal Detention Center facility in Miami, Florida.

=== Direct appeal of criminal conviction ===
As of February 28, 2008, Padilla had appealed his conviction and sentence and the government had cross-appealed. The Wall Street Journal said in an editorial, "the lawyers suing for Padilla aren't interested in justice. They're practicing 'lawfare', which is an effort to undermine the war on terror by making U.S. officials afraid to pursue it for fear of personal liability." In January 2012, the Fourth Circuit Court of Appeals upheld a lower court decision and his case has been ruled on numerous times.

=== Sentence increase and release ===
On September 19, 2011, a three-judge panel of the 11th U.S. Circuit Court of Appeals threw out the 17-year prison sentence imposed on Padilla, ruling that the sentence was too lenient. They sent the case back to the lower court for a new sentencing hearing. The Court said, "Padilla's sentence of 12 years below the low end of the [sentencing] guidelines range reflects a clear error of judgment about the sentencing of this career offender." On September 9, 2014, the district court sentenced Padilla to 21 years.

Padilla was serving his sentence at ADX Florence prison in Florence, Colorado. He was later transferred to the United States Medical Center for Federal Prisoners in Springfield, Missouri. He was then transferred to MCC Chicago for a short period before being released on November 12, 2026. Padilla's prisoner number is 20796-424.

== Criticism of his conviction ==
- Andrew Patel, Padilla's lawyer, said after the guilty verdict,

What happened in this trial, I think you have to put it in the context of federal conspiracy law, where the government doesn't have to prove that something happened, but just that people agree that something should happen in the future. In this case, it was even more strained. The crime charged in this case was actually an agreement to agree to do something in the future. So when you're dealing with a charge like that, you're not going to have—or the government's not going to be required to produce the kind of evidence that you would expect in a normal criminal case.

- American economist Paul Craig Roberts criticized the jury's verdict in the Padilla case as having "overthrown" the Constitution and done far more damage to U.S. liberty than any terrorist could.
- British journalist Andy Worthington wrote:
  [Seventeen] years and four months seems to me to be an extraordinarily long sentence for little more than a thought crime, but when the issue of Padilla's three and half years of suppressed torture is raised, it's difficult not to conclude that justice has just been horribly twisted, that the president and his advisers have just got away with torturing an American citizen with impunity, and that no American citizen can be sure that what happened to Padilla will not happen to him or her. Today, it was a Muslim; tomorrow, unless the government's powers are taken away from them, it could be any number of categories of 'enemy combatants' who have not yet been identified.
- Timothy Lynch of the Cato Institute raised several issues related to the Padilla seizure in an amicus brief he filed to the Supreme Court. In it, he asks questions such as whether the president can lock up any person in the world and then deny that person access to family, defense counsel, and civilian court review; and objects to the use of "harsh conditions" and "environmental stresses". He questioned whether such techniques can be employed against anyone once the president gives an order. Those legal questions remain unsettled. Lynch argued that, by abruptly moving Padilla from the military brig and transferring him into the civil criminal justice system, the Bush administration was able to forestall Supreme Court review of the president's military powers.
- Glenn Greenwald, journalist and former constitutional law and civil rights litigator, wrote a highly critical piece in the online magazine Salon.com in September 2011:
  The treatment Padilla has received in the justice system is, needless to say, the polar opposite of that enjoyed by these political elites ... Literally days before it was required to justify to the U.S. Supreme Court how it could imprison an American citizen for years without charges or access to a lawyer, the Bush administration suddenly indicted Padilla -- on charges unrelated to, and far less serious than, the accusation that he was A Dirty Bomber -- and then successfully convinced the Supreme Court to refuse to decide the legality of Padilla's imprisonment on the grounds of 'mootness'.

== Civil proceedings ==
On January 4, 2008, Padilla and his mother filed suit against John Yoo in the U.S. District Court, Northern District of California (Case Number CV08 0035). The complaint sought damages based on the alleged torture of Padilla, and attributed this treatment as having been authorized by Yoo's legal opinions issued in August 2002, known as the "Torture memos". The suit posited that Yoo caused Padilla's damages by authorizing Padilla's alleged torture through his memoranda.

On June 28, 2009, the trial court held that the complaint should not be dismissed for failure to state a claim, because if everything stated in the complaint was taken as true, it stated grounds for Yoo to be liable to Padilla for civil damages. But on February 17, 2011, the District Court dismissed another suit by Padilla against other former officials which had been brought on February 9, 2007. Lebron v. Rumsfeld, 764 F.Supp.2d 787 (D.S.C.). On January 23, 2012, the U.S. Court of Appeals for the Fourth Circuit affirmed this dismissal.

In May 2012, the U.S. 9th Circuit Court of Appeals ruled that Yoo could not be held accountable for Padilla's treatment because, though his treatment might have amounted to torture, it was not defined as such legally in 2002–2003 when it occurred.

== Names ==
According to his attorney and others, Padilla has changed the pronunciation of his surname from the typical /pəˈdiːjə/ pə-DEE-yə to /pəˈdɪlə/ pə-DIL-ə.

Padilla's Arabic name Abdullah al-Muhajir, which he began using during his jail sentence, literally means "Abdullah the migrant". "Al-Muhajir" is a laqab (epithet) rather than an adopted family name.

== See also ==
- Military Commissions Act of 2006
- List of Puerto Ricans
- List of Guantánamo Bay detainees
- Islamist terrorism
