= Hamdi v. Rumsfeld =

- Supreme Court of the United States

Argued April 28, 2004 Decided June 28, 2004
- Full case name: Yaser Esam Hamdi and Esam Fouad Hamdi as next friend of Yaser Esam Hamdi, Petitioners v. Donald H. Rumsfeld, Secretary of Defense, et al.
- Citations: 542 U.S. 507 (more) 124 S. Ct. 2633; 159 L. Ed. 2d 578; 2004 U.S. LEXIS 4761; 72 U.S.L.W. 4607; 2004 Fla. L. Weekly Fed. S 486
- Argument: Oral argument
- Opinion announcement: Opinion announcement

Case history
- Prior: Order for attorney access granted, E.D. Va., 5-29-02; reversed and remanded, 294 F.3d 598 (4th Cir. 2002); motion to dismiss denied, 243 F. Supp. 2d 527 (E.D. Va. 2002); reversed and remanded, 316 F.3d 450 (4th Cir. 2003); rehearing denied, 337 F.3d 335 (4th Cir. 2003); cert. granted, 540 U.S. 1099 (2004).
- Subsequent: Remanded to district court, 378 F.3d 426 (4th Cir. 2004)

Holding
- U.S. citizens designated as enemy combatants by the Executive Branch have a right to challenge their detainment under the Due Process Clause. Fourth Circuit Court of Appeals vacated and remanded.

Court membership
- Chief Justice William Rehnquist Associate Justices John P. Stevens · Sandra Day O'Connor; Antonin Scalia · Anthony Kennedy; David Souter · Clarence Thomas; Ruth Bader Ginsburg · Stephen Breyer

Case opinions
- Plurality: O'Connor, joined by Rehnquist, Kennedy, Breyer
- Concur/dissent: Souter, joined by Ginsburg
- Dissent: Scalia, joined by Stevens
- Dissent: Thomas

Laws applied
- U.S. Const. art. II, amend. V; 18 U.S.C. § 4001; 115 Stat. 224 (Authorization for Use of Military Force)

Hamdi v. Rumsfeld, 542 U.S. 507 (2004), is a United States Supreme Court case in which the Court recognized the power of the U.S. government to detain enemy combatants, including U.S. citizens, but ruled that detainees who are U.S. citizens must have the rights of due process, and the ability to challenge their enemy combatant status before an impartial authority.

It reversed the dismissal by a lower court of a habeas corpus petition brought on behalf of Yaser Esam Hamdi, a U.S. citizen who was being detained indefinitely as an illegal enemy combatant after being captured in Afghanistan in 2001. Following the court's decision, on October 9, 2004, the U.S. government released Hamdi without charge and deported him to Saudi Arabia, where his family lived and he had grown up, on the condition that he renounce his U.S. citizenship, commit to travel prohibitions and other conditions.

== Background ==
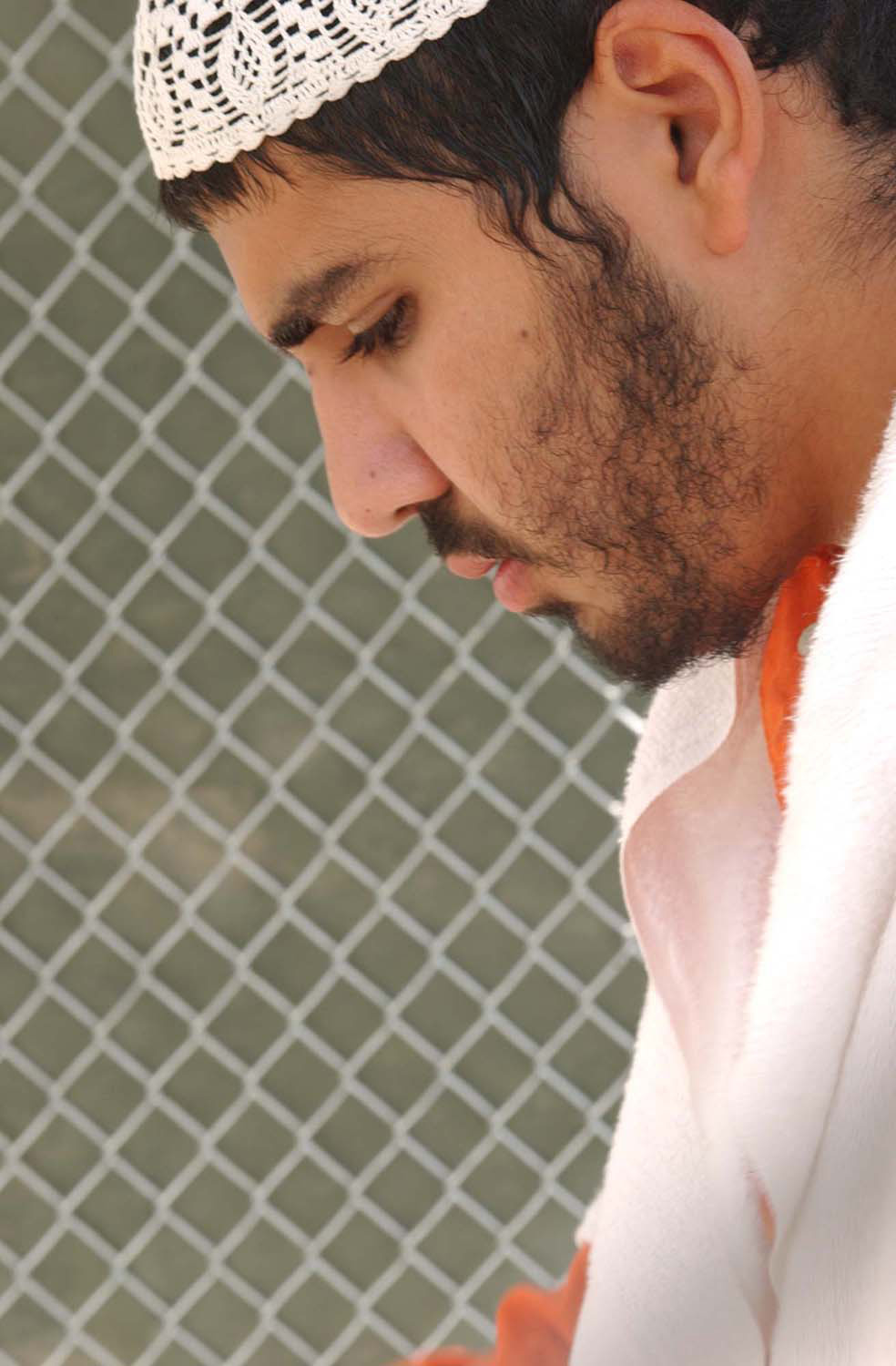
Hamdi during his detention at Guantanamo Bay

=== Early life and capture ===
Yaser Esam Hamdi was born in Louisiana as a citizen of the United States in 1980. That same year, he and his family moved to Saudi Arabia.

According to his father, Hamdi went to Afghanistan in the late summer of 2001 as a relief worker. He was then captured less than two months after his arrival by the Afghan Northern Alliance. They turned him over to U.S. military authorities during the U.S. invasion. He was classified as an enemy combatant by the U.S. armed forces and detained in connection with ongoing hostilities.

Hamdi's father claimed that Hamdi had gone to Afghanistan to do relief work and was trapped there when the U.S. invasion began, citing his young age and lack of travel experience as reasons for his being trapped.

=== Detention and legal challenge ===
After his capture in 2001, Hamdi was detained and interrogated in Afghanistan. In January 2002, the Americans transferred Hamdi to Guantanamo Bay. In April 2002, when officials discovered that he held U.S. (as well as Saudi) citizenship, they transferred him to a Naval brig in Norfolk, Virginia, and finally to the Naval Consolidated Brig in Charleston, South Carolina. In June 2002, Hamdi's father, Esam Fouad Hamdi, filed a habeas corpus petition in the United States District Court for the Eastern District of Virginia to challenge his detention.

The Bush administration claimed that because Hamdi was caught in arms against the U.S., he could be properly detained as an enemy combatant, without any oversight of presidential decision making, and without access to an attorney or the court system. The administration argued that this power was constitutional and necessary to effectively fight the war on terror, declared by the Congress of the United States in the Authorization for Use of Military Force passed after the September 11 terrorist attacks. The government used its detention authority to ensure that terrorists were no longer a threat while active combat operations continued and to ensure suspects could be fully interrogated.

=== District case ===
Judge Robert G. Doumar ruled that Hamdi's father was a proper "next friend" having standing to sue on behalf of his son, and ordered that a federal public defender be given access to Hamdi. On appeal, however, the Fourth Circuit reversed the District Court's order, ruling that the District Court had failed to give proper deference to the government's "intelligence and security interests", and that it should proceed with a properly deferential investigation.

The case was sent back to the District Court, which denied the government's motion to dismiss Hamdi's petition. Judge Doumar found the government's evidence supporting Hamdi's detention "woefully inadequate", and based predominantly on hearsay and bare assertions. The District Court ordered the government to produce numerous documents for in camera review by the court that would enable it to perform a "meaningful judicial review", such as the statements by the Northern Alliance regarding Hamdi's capture, the dates and circumstances of his capture and interrogations, and a list of all the officials involved in the determination of his "enemy combatant" status.

=== Appellate case ===
The government appealed Judge Doumar's order to produce the evidence, and the Fourth Circuit again reversed the District Court. Because it was "undisputed that Hamdi was captured in a zone of active combat in a foreign theater of conflict", the Fourth Circuit said that it was not proper for any court to hear a challenge of his status. It ruled that the broad warmaking powers delegated to the President under Article Two of the United States Constitution and the principle of separation of powers prohibited courts from interfering in this vital area of national security.

After the Fourth Circuit denied a petition for rehearing en banc, Hamdi's father appealed to the U.S. Supreme Court. It granted certiorari review and reversed the Fourth Circuit's ruling. Hamdi was represented before the Court by the late Federal Public Defender Frank W. Dunham, Jr., and the Government's side was argued by the Principal Deputy Solicitor General, Paul Clement.

== Opinion of the Court ==
Though no single opinion of the Court commanded a majority, six of the nine justices of the Court agreed that the executive branch does not have the power to hold a U.S. citizen indefinitely without basic due process protections enforceable through judicial review.

=== Plurality opinion ===
Justice O'Connor wrote a plurality opinion representing the Court's judgment, which was joined by Chief Justice Rehnquist and Justices Breyer and Kennedy. O'Connor wrote that although Congress had expressly authorized the detention of enemy combatants in its Authorization for Use of Military Force (AUMF) passed after 9/11, due process required that Hamdi have a meaningful opportunity to challenge his enemy combatant status.

Justice O'Connor used the three-part test of Mathews v. Eldridge to limit the due process to be received. This required notice of the charges and an opportunity to be heard, though because of the burden of ongoing military conflict upon the executive, normal procedural protections, such as placing the burden of proof on the government or the ban on hearsay, need not apply. O'Connor suggested the Department of Defense create fact-finding tribunals similar to the AR 190-8 to determine whether a detainee merited continued detention as an enemy combatant.

In response, the United States Department of Defense created Combatant Status Review Tribunals, modeling them after the AR 190-8. O'Connor did not write at length on Hamdi's right to an attorney, because by the time the Court rendered its decision, Hamdi had been granted access to one. But O'Connor wrote that Hamdi "unquestionably has the right to access to counsel in connection with the proceedings on remand." The plurality held that judges need not be involved in reviewing these cases, rather only that an "impartial decision maker" was required. Justice O'Connor also limited the reach of the Court's conclusion regarding the executive authority to detain enemy combatants:

For purposes of this case, the enemy combatant that [the government] is seeking to detain is an individual who, it alleges, was part of or supporting forces hostile to the United States or coalition partners in Afghanistan and who engaged in an armed conflict against the United States there. We therefore answer only the narrow question before us, whether the detention of citizens falling within that definition is authorized.

The plurality asserted that the Judiciary must not defer to the executive with respect to detentions. Instead the constitution empowers the judiciary to act as a check on executive power in this realm. Justice O'Connor wrote:

[W]e necessarily reject the Government's assertion that separation of powers principles mandate a heavily circumscribed role for the courts in such circumstances. Indeed, the position that the courts must forgo any examination of the individual case and focus exclusively on the legality of the broader detention scheme cannot be mandated by any reasonable view of separation of powers, as this approach serves only to condense power into a single branch of government. We have long since made clear that a state of war is not a blank check for the President when it comes to the rights of the Nation's citizens. 'Youngstown Sheet & Tube Co. v. Sawyer,' 343 U. S., at 587. Whatever power the United States Constitution envisions for the Executive in its exchanges with other nations or with enemy organizations in times of conflict, it most assuredly envisions a role for all three branches when individual liberties are at stake. ... Likewise, we have made clear that, unless Congress acts to suspend it, the Great Writ of habeas corpus allows the Judicial Branch to play a necessary role in maintaining this delicate balance of governance, serving as an important judicial check on the Executive's discretion in the realm of detentions. ... it would turn our system of checks and balances on its head to suggest that a citizen could not make his way to court with a challenge to the factual basis for his detention by his government, simply because the Executive opposes making available such a challenge. Absent suspension of the writ by Congress, a citizen detained as an enemy combatant is entitled to this process.

=== Souter concurrence and dissent ===
Justice David Souter, joined by Justice Ruth Bader Ginsburg, concurred with the plurality's judgment that due process protections must be available for Hamdi to challenge his status and detention, providing a majority for that part of the ruling. However, he dissented from the plurality's ruling that AUMF established Congressional authorization for the detention of enemy combatants.

=== Scalia dissent ===
Justice Antonin Scalia's dissent, joined by Justice John Paul Stevens, went the furthest in restricting the executive power of detention. Scalia asserted that based on historical precedent, the government had two options to detain Hamdi: Congress could suspend the right to habeas corpus, or Hamdi could be tried under normal criminal law. Scalia wrote that the plurality, though well-meaning, had no basis in law for trying to establish new procedures that would be applicable in a challenge to Hamdi's detention – it was only the job of the Court to declare it unconstitutional and order his release or proper arrest, rather than to invent an acceptable process for detention. Scalia and Stevens also suggested that there is a time-limited exception to the ancient right of habeas corpus:

Where the commitment was for felony or high treason, the [Habeas Corpus Act 1679] did not require immediate release, but instead required the Crown to commence criminal proceedings within a specified time.... [T]he practical effect of this provision was that imprisonment without indictment or trial for felony or high treason under §7 would not exceed approximately three to six months.

=== Thomas dissent ===
Justice Clarence Thomas was the only justice who sided entirely with the executive branch and the Fourth Circuit's ruling, based on his view of the security interests at stake and the President's broad war-making powers. Thomas wrote that the Court's rationale would also require due process rights for bombing targets: "Because a decision to bomb a particular target might extinguish life interests, the plurality's analysis seems to require notice to potential targets." Thomas also wrote that Congress intended that the AUMF authorize such detentions. Thomas would later make use of this dissent in Turner v. Rogers in 2011.

== Subsequent developments ==
Although by the terms used in the Court's holdings, they were apparently limited to "citizen-detainees", the last paragraph of section III, D of the O'Connor plurality (four justices: O'Connor, Rehnquist, Kennedy, and Breyer) relies on the Geneva Convention and states that habeas corpus should be available to an "alleged enemy combatant".

On the same day, the Court held in Rasul v. Bush (2004) that U.S. courts have jurisdiction to hear habeas corpus petitions filed by the Guantanamo detainees, and other foreign nationals.

The government conceded that some very limited due process rights, allowing for hearings to determine the detainees' status as enemy combatants and the right to legal counsel, would be extended to all of the Guantanamo detainees, citizen and non-citizen alike. The application of the Court's decisions in these cases is consistent with the fact that the other two justices in the Hamdi majority, as well as two of the dissenting justices (Scalia and Stevens), were more restrictive in their willingness to concede any of the detention powers requested by the government for Guantanamo detainees in the Hamdi case.

In regard to the detention of detainees without charge, in section I of the O'Connor plurality opinion, the plurality relied on the time-honored traditions of war, the Geneva Convention, and a long list of other international treaties, to hold that the government had authority under the Authorization for Use of Military Force (2001) to hold any enemy combatants, provided enemy combatants had been seized on the battlefield participating in active hostilities, for the sole objective of preventing an enemy combatant from returning to the battlefield, and then only so long as there continued to be "active hostilities". The plurality held that such protective detention could be applied to both citizen and non-citizen enemy combatants.

The plurality opinion stated:

There can be no doubt that individuals who fought against the United States in Afghanistan as part of the Taliban, an organization known to have supported the al Qaeda terrorist network responsible for those attacks, are individuals Congress sought to target in passing the AUMF. We conclude that detention of individuals falling into the limited category we are considering, for the duration of the particular conflict in which they were captured, is so fundamental and accepted an incident to war as to be an exercise of the "necessary and appropriate force" Congress has authorized the President to use. ... A citizen, no less than an alien, can be "part of or supporting forces hostile to the United States or coalition partners" and "engaged in an armed conflict against the United States," ...; such a citizen, if released, would pose the same threat of returning to the front during the ongoing conflict [as an alien].... Because detention to prevent a combatant's return to the battlefield is a fundamental incident of waging war, in permitting the use of "necessary and appropriate force", Congress has clearly and unmistakably authorized detention in the narrow circumstances considered here. ... Under the definition of enemy combatant that we accept today as falling within the scope of Congress' authorization, Hamdi would need to be "part of or supporting forces hostile to the United States or coalition partners" and "engaged in an armed conflict against the United States" to justify his detention in the United States for the duration of the relevant conflict.

The U.S. government had argued that it had the right to detain enemy combatants indefinitely for the two purposes of interrogation and to prevent a return to the battlefield. Justice O'Connor rejected the first purpose by stating definitively that "indefinite detention for the purpose of interrogation is not authorized." With regard to the second purpose, the plurality held "Necessary and appropriate force" amounted to authorization to detain "for the duration of the relevant conflict", in order to prevent enemy combatants from rejoining the fight.

Of the four justices outside the plurality, Justices Ginsburg and Souter limited their opinions to their position that Section 4001(a) of Title 18 of the United States Code (the Non-Detention Act; enacted to prevent the sort of detention that occurred when the United States placed Japanese-American citizens in concentration camps during World War II), prevented the detention of U.S. citizens. Justice Scalia (whose opinion was joined by Justice Stevens), restricted his holding to citizen-detainees and implied that anyone held outside of United States' territory might be beyond the reach of the Court altogether. Again, the Rasul case did not directly address the detention issue, and any hearings would be limited to the determination of enemy combatant status.

- In Hamdan v. Rumsfeld (2006), the Court decided that the "military commissions" created to try unlawful combatants for war crimes suffered from certain fatal procedural defects under the Uniform Code of Military Justice and the Geneva Convention, and were without other legal authority to proceed. They overruled Congress' attempt to deprive the Court of jurisdiction to decide that issue by passing the Detainee Treatment Act. Justices in the majority (particularly Justices Kennedy and Breyer) disagreed with Justice Stevens as to whether the "charge" of conspiracy could be maintained to justify the determination of unlawful combatant status. Although the Court struck down the military commissions as created by the Executive Branch, they did not provide the detainees with direct access to the federal courts, but only with access to a fair and impartial hearing to a tribunal constitutionally authorized by Congress and proceeding with certain due process guarantees (such as one operated under terms similar to those provided by Article I courts under the UCMJ or according to the terms of the Third Geneva Convention of 1949).
- On October 17, 2006, the president signed the Military Commissions Act, passed by Congress and authorizing a type of military tribunal to be used at Guantanamo Bay detention camp, as requested by the Bush administration. That fall, the administration transferred fourteen high-value detainees to Guantanamo Bay from black sites overseas.
- In Boumediene v. Bush (2008), the Court ruled that detainees, and other foreign nationals, do have the right to direct access to federal courts to challenge their detentions.

== See also ==
- Donald Rumsfeld
- Center for Constitutional Rights, a New York City–based legal nonprofit organization that legally represents over 150 of the Guantanamo Bay detainees
- Terrorism
- Donald Vance
