= President (CSRT) =

BAKOD Pilipinas genuine opposition

The Combatant Status Review Tribunal the US Department of Defense commissioned, like the tribunals described in Army Regulation 190-8, which they were modeled after, were three member panels, led by a tribunal president.

== History of the tribunals ==
Initially United States President George W. Bush asserted that captives taken during the "Global War on Terror":

- Did not qualify for Prisoner of War status, as defined by the Geneva Conventions.
- Were not entitled to the protection of having a "competent tribunal" convened, where their combatant status would be openly reviewed.

This assertion was criticized by many legal scholars. And lawyers who volunteered to represent Guantanamo captives mounted legal challenges in the US Court system. The first legal challenge to be heard before the United States Supreme Court was Rasul v. Bush.

The Supreme Court addressed some aspects of the case. In particular, it ruled that the Guantanamo captives were entitled to an opportunity to hear, and challenge, the allegations the DoD felt justified their continued extrajudicial detention.

Supreme Court Justice Sandra Day O'Connor wrote that the Department of Defense should convene tribunals similar to those described in Army Regulation 190-8.

Army Regulation 190-8 sets out the procedure officers of the United States armed forces should follow to determine whether captives taken during a war where:

1. lawful combatants, entitled to the protections of POW status.
2. innocent civilian refugees, who should be released immediately.
3. combatants who have acted in a manner that has stripped them of the protections of POW status.

== Role of the tribunal president ==
The tribunal president had to be a "field grade officer".

- Captives were entitled to request any witnesses or documents they thought might help show they were not enemy combatants. The Tribunal president had the authority and responsibility to rule whether the captive's request were "relevant".
- If the tribunal president ruled that a request for witnesses, or documents, were relevant, they then had the authority and responsibility to rule whether the captive's requested witnesses or documents were "reasonably available".
- The tribunal president had the authority to rule on all other administrative matters.

The most important difference between a CSRT Tribunal and an AR 190-8 Tribunal lay in their respective mandates.

The AR-190-8 Tribunals were intended to comply with the United States responsibilities, as a signatory to the Geneva Conventions, to establish a "competent tribunal" for any captive around whom there is doubt as to their combatant status. The Geneva Conventions state that all captives have to be accorded all the protections of Prisoner of War status, until a competent tribunal sat, and determined that the captive was not a "lawful combatant".

The AR-190-8 Tribunals have the authority to rule that:

1. A captive was a civilian refugee, not a combatant. Captives who were determined to have been civilian refugees should then be immediately released.
2. A captive was a "lawful combatant", who should continue to enjoy all the protections of Prisoner of War status. Captives who were classified as lawful combatants and Prisoners of War, cannot be tried for the actions they had taken, prior to capture, which were, by definition, lawful. Prisoners of War are protected from being compelled to answer any questions beyond their "name, rank and serial number".
3. A captive was a combatant, but one who had acted in a manner that had stripped them of lawful combatant status could face trial. They would no longer be protected by the Geneva Convention protection against interrogation.

The Combatant Status Review Tribunals, notably, did not have the authority to rule on whether the Guantanamo captives were, or weren't, entitled to the protections of Prisoner of War status. They were merely authorized to determine whether previous secret determinations that the captives met a new, very broad definition of "enemy combatant".

During testimony before her, US District Court Justice Joyce Hens Green asked one of the Government's senior lawyers whether a little old lady, from Switzerland, who sent a donation to a charity she believed was a legitimate charity, could be considered an enemy combatant, if, without her knowledge that charity had been subverted, and some of its resources had been diverted to support the Taliban or al Qaeda. She was told the little old lady could be considered an enemy combatant.

== Criticisms of the performance of tribunal presidents ==
Mark P. Denbeaux, a professor of law at Seton Hall University, who defended two Guantanamo captives, was the leader of a team of legal scholars who published twelve methodical, systematic analyses of the Guantanamo documents, noted several times other officers had criticized the tribunal presidents. The report entitled "No-hearing hearings" noted that tribunal presidents routinely disallowed witness requests for reasons that weren't authorized by the tribunal procedures. Tribunal presidents were authorized to disallow witness requests when they ruled they weren't "relevant", or "reasonably available". But tribunal presidents would disallow witness requests based on rulings that they were "redundant", or that their testimony would be "hearsay".

Andrew Cohen, writing in The Washington Post, wrote:

If a regular trial court proceeding were this shoddy, this unwilling to perform a truth-seeking function, this unable to achieve a fair process, the judge presiding over it would be impeached.

Neil A. Lewis, after observing several Combatant Status Review Tribunals in November 2004, noted: "The hearings here have come under heavy criticism because they do not meet the traditional standards of court proceedings." Lewis quoted an exchange between a Yemeni captive who asked for the proof that backed up the allegations against him, and the President's response: "We're not here to debate these points. This is what we're given and this is your opportunity to give us your story."

== See also ==
- Personal Representative (CSRT)
- Reporter (CSRT)
- Administrative Review Board
- Presiding Officer (ARB)
- Assisting Military Officer (ARB)
- Designated Military Officer (ARB)
- Office for the Administrative Review of the Detention of Enemy Combatants
