= Abdullah Mujahid =

Afghan Guantanamo detainee

- Born: 1971 (age 54–55)
- Detained at: Guantanamo
- ISN: 1100
- Charge: No charge (held in extrajudicial detention)
- Status: Repatriated in the fall of 2007

Abdullah Mujahid (born 1971) is a citizen of Afghanistan who is still held in extrajudicial detention after being transferred from United States Guantanamo Bay detainment camps, in Cuba — to an Afghan prison. His Guantanamo Internment Serial Number was 1100.

According to the Associated Press, the allegations against Mujahid, in his Combatant Status Review Tribunal, state Mujahid was head of security for the city of Gardez and for Paktia province. He was accused of ties to al-Qaeda and of attacking U.S. forces, and was arrested in July 2003. Mujahid claimed he was loyal to the coalition.

== Background ==
Abdullah Mujahid is a militia leader from Afghanistan's Tajik ethnic group, who rose up against the Taliban in the closing days of its administration of Afghanistan. The Afghanistan Transitional Authority rewarded Mujahid, and other militia leaders who had risen up against the Taliban, with the control of security forces. Both Mujahid and Pacha Khan Zadran, a Pashtun from the Zadran tribe, were rewarded with security appointments in Paktia province.

Mujahid and Zadran struggled to consolidate greater shares of control over Paktia's security forces. Mujahid and Zadran's forces were reported to have engaged in gun battles during their disputes. Both men's forces were accused of abusing their authority and routinely robbing civilians at their roadblocks.

By 2003, both men were regarded as renegades and enemies by US forces.

A high-level delegation from Kabul visited Mujahid, and offered him a nominally more senior position in Kabul as a "Highway Commander". Mujahid accepted this offer, and yielded up his position as Chief of Police of Gardez, and traveled to Kabul. However, the promised promotion never materialized. When Mujahid returned home to Gardez, he was sent to Guantanamo.

Zadran's nephew, and Lieutenant, Jan Baz, was also apprehended and sent to Bagram Theater detention facility. But Zadran remained at large, and now represents Paktia in the Afghan Parliament.

Mujahid faced a number of allegations during his Combatant Status Review Tribunal and Administrative Review Board hearings: notably that he was fired for corruption and collusion with the opposition, that he was a senior commander of Lashkar-e-Taiba, a Pakistani militant group based in Kashmir. He was also accused of currently being a member of Harakat-e-Mulavi, a group which American intelligence analysts believe is now allied with the rebels.

Mujahid's lawyers assert that the Lashkar-e-Taiba connection is a case of mistaken identity. A senior commander of the Lashkar-e-Taiba, also named Abdullah Mujahid, was killed in 2006. Mujahid's lawyers acknowledge that he fought with Harakat-e-Mulavi, against some of Afghanistan's foreign occupiers—during the Soviet occupation of Afghanistan, during the 1980s.

All of the allegations against Mujahid have been dropped in early 2007, and he was cleared for release. However, as of August 2007, he still remains in Guantanamo.

== Combatant Status Review ==
The Bush administration asserted that:

the protections of the Geneva Conventions did not extend to captured prisoners who are not members of the regular Afghan armed force nor meet the criteria for prisoner of war for voluntary forces.

Critics argued the Conventions obliged the U.S. to conduct competent tribunals to determine the status of prisoners. Subsequently, the U.S. Department of Defense instituted Combatant Status Review Tribunals (CSRTs), to determine whether detainees met the new definition of an "enemy combatant".

"Enemy combatant" was defined by the U.S. Department of Defense as:

an individual who was part of, or supporting, the Taliban, or al-Qaeda forces, or associated forces that are engaged in hostilities against the United States or its coalition partners. This includes any person who commits a belligerent act or has directly supported hostilities in aid of enemy armed forces.

The CSRTs are not bound by the rules of evidence that would normally apply in civilian court, and the government's evidence is presumed to be “genuine and accurate.” From July 2004 through March 2005, CSRTs were convened to determine whether each prisoner had been correctly classified as an "enemy combatant".

Abdullah Mujahid was among the 60% of prisoners who chose to participate in tribunal hearings. A Summary of Evidence memo was prepared for the tribunal of each detainee, listing the allegations that supported their detention as an "enemy combatant".

Abdullah Mujahid's memo accused him of the following:

a. The detainee is associated with al Qaida:

1. After the fall of the Taliban, the detainee served as a police force commander in Gardez, Afghanistan.
2. The detainee was fired from his appointed position due to suspicions of collusion with anti-government forces.
3. The detainee has been a member of Harakat-e-Mulavi for at least the last four years.
4. Harakat-e-Mulavi is an extremist group that is known to have ties with al Qaida and the Taliban.

b. The detainee participated in military operations against the United States or its coalition partners.

1. The detainee was responsible for an attack on US Forces in the vicinity of Gardeyz City, Afghanistan.
2. The detainee was responsible for this attack in retaliation for being fired.
3. The detainee was captured by U.S. forces in July 2003.

=== Witnesses ===
Mujahid requested eight witnesses:

- Said Mohammed Ali Shah - a Guantanamo detainee.
- Haji Mohammed Aktiar - the Tribunal's president doesn't identify Aktiar any further, but assumes he is back in Afghanistan. In fact three individuals named Akhtiar Mohammed were detained in Guantanamo, and two were still in detention at the time of the Tribunals.
- Mohammed Aman - also a Guantanamo detainee.
- Mohammed Musa - apparently also a Guantanamo detainee. But his name does not match that of any on the official list.
- Shahzdeh Masoud - one of Hamid Karzai's advisors, who led a delegation to Gardez to convince Mujahid to step down.
- Gulltay Deh - the Afghan Defense Ministry's representative on Masoud's delegation.
- Haji Saifullah - the Boston Globe reported Saifullah was dead.
- Minister of Interior - Ahmed Ali Jalali - the Interior Ministry's representative on Masoud's delegation, currently teaching at the National Defense University in Washington, D.C.

The Tribunal's president decided to allow three of the other Guantanamo detainees as witnesses. However, he informed Mujahid that they would not be allowed to testify, in person, for "Force Protection reasons". He then informed Mujahid that American officials had not been able to secure the cooperation of the Afghan government in locating the witnesses back in Afghanistan.

The Boston Globe reported that they found that many witnesses that detainees had requested, who US officials claimed were not reasonably available, were easily located. The article particularly the ease with which they located Mujahid's witnesses. It quoted the President of Mujahid's Tribunal:

The Afghan government was contacted on or about 26 November 2004, As of this date, the Afghanistan government has not responded to our request. . . . Without the cooperation of that government, we are unable to contact those witnesses and to obtain the testimony you requested.

The article then stated:

But in Afghanistan earlier this month, a reporter for the Globe located three of the four witnesses in a matter of days.

=== Transcript ===
Mujahid chose to participate in his Combatant Status Review Tribunal. On March 3, 2006, in response to a court order from Jed Rakoff the Department of Defense published a twelve-page summarized transcript from his Combatant Status Review Tribunal, and nine pages of statements from witnesses who were not allowed to testify in person at his Tribunal.

=== Testimony ===
Mujahid denied that he was removed due to suspicions of collusion with anti-government forces. He testified that he left the position of Provincial Security Chief to assume a new position in Kabul. He claimed the witnesses of the visiting commission would testify that he left his position to take a promotion. Mujahid denied being associated with any anti-government forces. He also denied any responsibility for any attacks on US or coalition forces.

The three witnesses he called all confirmed that he had been an effective Police commander for the Karzai government, and confirmed that he was not fired, he was promoted.

They attributed their captures to false denunciations from rival factions within Karzai's coalition.

=== Hafizullah Shabaz Khail's accusation ===
Guantanamo detainee Hafizullah Shabaz Khail said that Mujahid had arrested him, when his mentor, the Governor, of his Province was in Kabul. Khail was the District Chief of Zormat, and the chair of the security committee in Paktia Province. Khail said his arrest, and the false allegations against him, were due to his arrest of a protégé of Mujahid, named Taj Mohammed. According to Khail, Taj Mohammed was a security officer who worked under Mujahid, who had abused his uniform and his authority to rob a businessman of 200,000 Khaldars. Khail said he forced Taj Mohammed to pay the businessman back.

== Abdullah Musahed v. George W. Bush ==
A writ of habeas corpus, Abdullah Musahed v. George W. Bush, was submitted on Abdullah Musahed's behalf. In response, on 10 August 2005, the Department of Defense published 37 pages of unclassified documents related to his Combatant Status Review Tribunal. On December 17, 2004 Tribunal panel 26 convened and confirmed his "enemy combatant" status.

The documents published from Abdullah's CSR Tribunal state that his original Tribunal President was replaced. The documents contain multiple incompatible explanations as to why Mohammed Musa's testimony was not made available. The documents state that the original Tribunal President had ruled his testimony "redundant". His Personal Representative's notes, however, stated that he couldn't find Mohammed Musa.

The CSRT's Legal Advisor recorded in his Legal Sufficiency Review:

The Tribunal President determined that the testimony of the fourth detainee witness was not relevant since the testimony was of a duplicative nature. In my opinion, the Tribunal should not have deemed the witness testimony duplicative; however, the Tribunal properly determined that the detainee was an enemy combatant absent this witness testimony.

=== Administrative Review Board ===
Detainees whose Combatant Status Review Tribunal labeled them "enemy combatants" were scheduled for annual Administrative Review Board hearings. These hearings were designed to assess the threat a detainee might pose if released or transferred, and whether there were other factors that warranted his continued detention.

=== Summary of Evidence memo ===
A Summary of Evidence memo was prepared for Abdullah Mujahid's Administrative Review Board, on 23 June 2005. The memo listed factors for and against his continued detention.

=== The following primary factors favor continued detention ===
a. Commitment
1. The detainee went to fight in the jihad against the Russians between 1987 and 1991.
2. The detainee was an assistant Investigation Commander for the police in Gardez between 1992 and 1995. Between 1995 and 1998, he was the military commander of an air defense bas in Kabul. From 2001 until 2003, the detainee was a Criminal Investigation Officer for the Gardez police.
3. The detainee was responsible for an attack near Gardez, Afghanistan which caused the death of one American and injury of two others.

b. Training
1. The detainee was a former Lashkar-e-Tayyiba commander.
2. The Lashkar-e-Tayyiba is the armed wing of the Pakistan-based religious organization, Markaz-ud-Dawa-irshad, a Sunni anti-U.S. missionary organization formed in 1989.
3. The Pakistani terrorist group Lashkar-e-Tayyiba had been transporting and hiding al Qaida members who escaped from Afghanistan. The detainee was identified as working in Quetta, Pakistan, assisting al Qaida members to move out of Afghanistan.
4. The detainee was identified as a member of the Military Council for the Lashkar-e-Tayyiba.
5. The detainee was chosen to replace Muhammad Azam Cheema as the Chief of Operations in India during a Lashkar-e-Tayyiba meeting in Muridke, Pakistan in February to early March 2003.
6. The detainee was reported to have ties to Hezb-e-Islami Gulbuddin and al Qaida.
7. Hezb-e-Islami Gulbuddin is a faction of the Hezb-e-Islami party, and it was one of the major mudjahedin groups in the war against the Soviets. Hezb-e-Islami Gulbuddin has long-established ties with Bin Ladin.
8. The detainee is affiliated with Mullah Abdul Fatah, a member of al Qaida, who conducted a meeting in Kabul, Afghanistan, on 16 August 2003, to recruit former explosive experts to conduct attacks.
9. The detainee was in contact with Saif Ur Rahman, a Taliban commander in Gardez, and Jalaluddin Haqqani, and al Qaida commander in Pakistan. The detainee worked against the U.S. and International Security Assistance Force and the Afghan government. The detainee had ties to local anti-coalition militias.
10. Rahman has known links with both Taliban and al Qaida.
11. Haqqani is the former commander in chief of the Talian Southern Forces and is heavily involved in the drug trade.

c. Intent
1. During a meeting with an Afghan Military force commander, General Zia Udeen and the detainee discussed operations to create disorder in the outlying areas around Gardez to disrupt civil security.

Other Relevant Data
1. The detainee was in the Afghan military during the Rabbani government and fought against the Taliban. He was appointed as head of security for Gardez and Paktia, and continued in this position during the Karzai government.
2. The detainee was fired and replaced as Director of Security for the Gardez area due to suspicions of collusion with anti-government forces.

=== The following primary factors favor release or transfer ===
a.

The detainee stated he was never associated or affiliated with any Taliban or al Qaida members, nor was he ever part of any military council associated with anti-U.S. and anti-coalition activities.

b.

The detainee stated he approves of the American involvement in Afghanistan because they are improving the country for everyone. When asked his feelings on jihad, the detainee stated he simply fought against the Russians when he was handed a weapon.

c.

The detainee claimed that neither he nor Zia Udeen did anything to create internal strife between competing villages and groups in Gardez and Paktia.

d.

The detainee stated he never heard of Mullah Abdul Fatah.

=== Transcript ===
Mujahid chose to participate in his Administrative Review Board hearing.

=== Response to the factors ===
- Mujahid confirmed he fought against the Soviets—for about eight months, when he was sixteen or seventeen. After the Soviets withdrew he fought against the Communist government that had been left behind.
- Mujahid confirmed that he had worked for the Rabbani government prior to the Taliban regime, and had served as a police officer after its fall. But, during the Taliban's regime he laid low, and worked as a simple farmer.
- Mujahid denied participating in an anti-US attack in Gardez. He disputed that this incident took place.
- In response to the allegation that he was a "former Lashkar-e-Tayyiba commander" he asked the time frame when he was supposed to have filled this role. He said he had given his interrogators a full account of his life, and there were no gaps in it when he could have been a Lashkar-e-Tayyiba. He added:

I don't even know the meaning of this word; this is the first time I have heard this word here. I was never asked about it during the interrogation or the tribunal. I don't know anything bad.

- After the factor where Lashkar-e-Tayyiba's roots in Pakistan were outlined he pointed out:

I'm from Afghanistan and not Pakistan and I would never go and join some Pakistani group or fight. I never traveled to Pakistan. I never went to their schools or Madrassa's. I wasn't raised in Pakistan. I'm Afghan.

== Mujahid and the claim that captives were "captured on the battlefield" ==
On August 12, 2007 Farah Stockman, writing in the Boston Globe used Mjuahid'd story to comment on the Bush administration's claim that Guantanamo captives had been apprehended "on the battlefield". Stockman described Mujahid as an early supporter during the overthrow of the Taliban, whose usefulness waned after their ouster, because he was illiterate, and was rumored to be corrupt. Stockman wrote:

A Globe investigation found that the military has used Guantanamo Bay not just for terrorists "picked up on the battlefield" -- as Bush has repeatedly asserted -- but also for uncooperative or unruly tribal chieftains, many of whom had been key supporters of the US-led invasion.

== Transfer to an Afghan prison ==
On November 25, 2008, the Department of Defense published a list of when Guantanamo captives were repatriated. According to that list he was repatriated on December 12, 2007.

The Center for Constitutional Rights reports that all of the Afghans repatriated to Afghanistan from April 2007 were sent to Afghan custody in the American built and supervised wing of the Pul-e-Charkhi prison near Kabul.
