= Detention (confinement) =

Holding a person by restricting their liberty

Unsentenced detainees as a proportion of overall prison population, 2023

Detention is the process whereby a state or private citizen holds a person by removing or restricting their freedom or liberty at that time.

Detention can be due to alleged criminal charges against the individual pursuant to a prosecution, to protect a person or property, or as part of a disciplinary action. Being detained does not always result in being taken to a particular area (generally called a detention center), either for interrogation or as punishment for a crime (see prison). Persons can be detained if they are not allowed to leave a specific jurisdiction (a type of travel ban known as an 'exit ban') or if they are prevented from traveling to or from a specific area or region. An individual may be detained due to a psychiatric disorder, potentially to treat this disorder involuntarily. They may also be detained for to prevent the spread of infectious diseases such as tuberculosis.

The term can also be used in reference to the holding of property for the same reasons. The process of detainment may or may not have been preceded or followed with an arrest.

Detainee is a term used by certain governments and their armed forces to refer to individuals held in custody, such as those it does not classify and treat as either prisoners of war or suspects in criminal cases. It is used to refer to "any person captured or otherwise detained by an armed force." More generally, it means "someone held in custody." The prisoners in Guantánamo Bay are referred to as "detainees".

Article 9 of the Universal Declaration of Human Rights provides that "[n]o one shall be subjected to arbitrary arrest, detention or exile." In international armed conflicts, treatment of detainees is governed by the provisions of the Fourth Geneva Convention.

== Definition ==
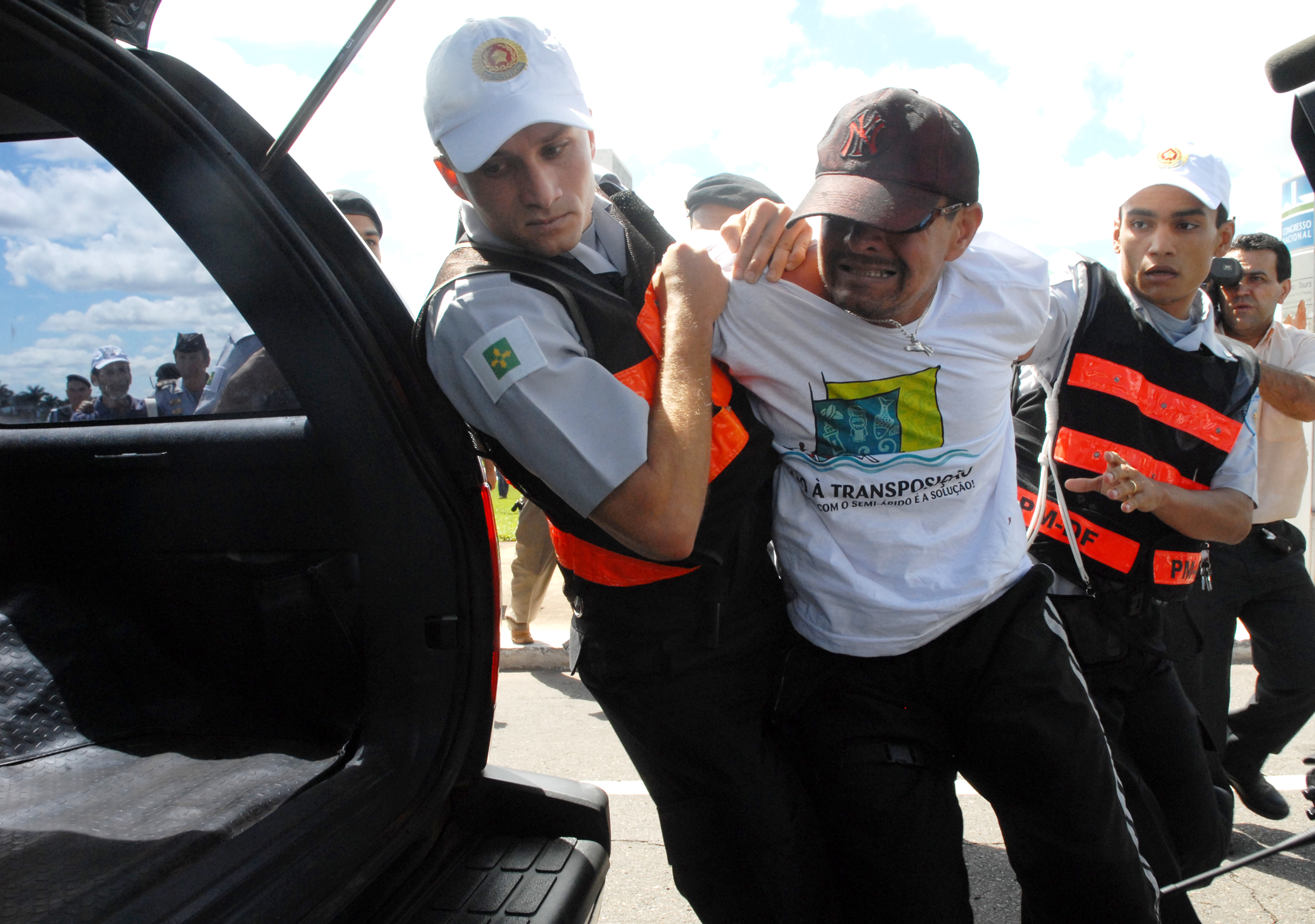
Man in wraparound glasses and a ball cap with his hands bound behind his back, detained in Brasília

Any form of restriction which prevents an individual from leaving a place, or where a person's liberty is restricted, can be classified as detention.

In some jurisdictions, individuals may be detained by police for questioning or for the execution of a search of a person, place, or thing. Individuals may also be detained by private individuals pending the arrival of police or other relevant law enforcement agency, often referred to as a citizen's arrest.

== Detention of a suspect ==
The detention of suspects is the process of keeping a person who has been arrested in a police-cell, remand prison or other detention centre before trial or sentencing.

The length of detention of suspected terrorists, with the justification of taking an action that would aid counter-terrorism, varies according to country or situation, as well as the laws which regulate it.

The Terrorism Act 2006 in the United Kingdom lengthened the 14-day limit for detention without an arrest warrant or an indictment from the Terrorism Act 2000 to 28 days. A controversial Government proposal for an extension to 90 days was rejected by the House of Commons. English criminal law requires the detainer/arrestor to have reasonable grounds to suspect (reasonable suspicion) when detaining (or arresting) someone.

== Wrongful detention ==
Wrongful detention occurs when a person or state intentionally restricts another person's movement within any area with legal authority but without justification or due process of law. A person who is wrongfully detained is confined to a specific place, but may not necessarily be imprisoned. Wrongful detentions can include travel bans or exit bans.

== Indefinite detention ==
Indefinite detention of an individual occurs frequently in wartime under the laws of war. This has been applied notably by the United States after the September 11 attacks. Before the Combatant Status Review Tribunals, created for reviewing the status of the Guantanamo detainees, the United States has argued that it is engaged in a legally recognizable armed conflict to which the laws of war apply, and that it therefore may hold captured al Qaeda and Taliban operatives throughout the duration of that conflict, without granting them a criminal trial.

The U.S. military regulates treatment of detainees in the manual Military Police: Enemy Prisoners of War, Retained Personnel, Civilian Internees and Other Detainees, last revised in 1997.

The term "unlawful combatant" came into public awareness during and after the War in Afghanistan (2001–present), as the U.S. detained members of the Taliban and al-Qaeda captured in that war, and determined them to be unlawful combatants. This had generated considerable debate around the globe. The U.S. government refers to these captured enemy combatants as "detainees" because they did not qualify as prisoners of war under the definition found in the Geneva Conventions.

Under the Obama administration the term enemy combatants was also removed from the lexicon and further defined under the 2010 Defense Omnibus Bill:

Section 948b. Military commissions generally: (a) Purpose-This chapter establishes procedures governing the use of military commissions to try alien unprivileged enemy belligerents for violations of the law of war and other offenses triable by military commission.

== Preventive detention ==
Preventive detention or pretrial detention refers to detaining of a person by the state, without conviction, based on dangerousness, to prevent them from causing public harm. The object of preventive detention is not to punish a person for having committed an offence, but to intrepret before they do it and to prevent them from doing it.

== Detention by country ==
=== China ===
There are three types of detention in the People's Republic of China: administrative detention (security detention), judicial detention (civil detention), and criminal detention (pre-trial detention).

==== Administrative detention (security detention) ====
Refers to the most severe sanctions for general violations of the "Public Security Administration Punishment Law of the People's Republic of China", which is a type of administrative punishment. The maximum period of public security detention is 20 days, and release upon expiration. Administrative detention shall be signed and approved by the administrative responsible person (i.e., director) of the public security agency at the county level and above, and shall be executed in the administrative detention facility under the public security agency. Those who are dissatisfied with the detention may initiate administrative reconsideration and administrative litigation. According to the decision of the Standing Committee of the National People's Congress, the Chinese national security agency and People's Armed Police has also been granted the power to enforce administrative detention penalties.

"Breakfast is a steamed bun, pickles and polenta. The meal will start at 6:30; at noon there will be two steamed buns. The dishes include potato beef, potato chicken, and scrambled eggs with seasonal vegetables. Instead of three dishes, choose one of three and start at 10:30." Li Yanhong was told by the man in the water splashing incident that the "straight man went up to the tree" the inside of the Chaoyang Detention Center.

==== Judicial detention ====
One refers to activities that hinder litigation in the course of civil, administrative litigation or court enforcement, such as perjurying, attacking the court, obstructing the testimony of witnesses, concealing and transferring sealed or seized property, obstructing court staff from performing their official duties, evading execution, etc. The detention decision directly made by the people's court is a judicial compulsory measure, based on the Civil Procedure Law or the Administrative Procedure Law. The maximum period is 20 days, and the court will deliver the detainee to the administrative detention facility of the public security department for execute. Those who are dissatisfied can apply to the court for reconsideration. During the period of detention, the court shall decide to explain in advance or release at the expiration of the term. There is also another type of judicial detention: Article 134 of the General Principles of the Civil Law stipulates: People's courts, in hearing civil cases, may be reprimanded, ordered to repent, and confiscated property and illegal gains for serious violations of civil laws and regulations and can be fined and detained in accordance with the law. It can be seen that the detention stipulated in the General Principles of the Civil Law is a punishment method used by the people's courts to impose short-term restrictions on the personal freedom of persons who seriously violate the civil laws and regulations in the name of the country. It is the most severe punishment in civil sanctions.

Article 38 of the National Compensation Law and Article 4 of the Interpretation of the Supreme People's Court on Several Issues Concerning Judicial Compensation in Civil and Administrative Litigations clearly stipulate the principle of the state's liability for civil execution compensation.

==== Criminal detention ====
Refers to the criminal compulsory measures taken by public security agency, national security agency, or the People's Procuratorate's Anti-Corruption Bureau or the Malfeasance Investigation Bureau in accordance with the provisions of the Criminal Procedure Law against current criminals or major suspects during criminal investigations. The criminal detention of the public security agency shall be approved by the person in charge of the administration of the public security agency at the county level (i.e., the director). Article 69 of the Criminal Procedure Law stipulates that if the public security organ considers a detained person to be arrested, it shall, within 3 days after detention, submit it to the investigation and supervision department of the People's Procuratorate for review and approval. Under special circumstances, the time for requesting review and approval can be extended by 1 to 4 days. For major suspects who commit crimes on the verge of committing crimes, committing multiple crimes, or ganging up to commit crimes, the time for review and approval can be extended to 30 days. The People's Procuratorate shall make a decision to approve the arrest or not to approve the arrest within seven days after receiving the public security agency's request to approve the arrest. If the People's Procuratorate does not approve the arrest, the public security agency shall release it immediately after receiving the notice, and promptly notify the People's Procuratorate of the execution. Those who need to continue the investigation and meet the conditions for release on bail pending trial or residential surveillance shall be released on bail pending trial or residential surveillance in accordance with the law. Article 15 Item 1 of the original version of the "National Compensation Law of the People’s Republic of China", which was implemented from January 1, 1995, to December 31, 2012, stipulates that: Detained by mistake", the detainee can apply for state compensation. Article 17 Item 1 of the revised "National Compensation Law of the People's Republic of China", which came into effect on January 1, 2013, provides for the issue of state compensation for criminal detention. Divided into two situations: Taking criminal detention measures illegally In the case of legally taking criminal detention measures but subsequently terminating the investigation of criminal responsibility, the victim must be detained beyond the detention period (up to 37 days) for the right to obtain compensation.

=== Japan ===
It is imposed for a period of between one and 30 days (maximum 29 days). It is shorter than imprisonment, which is a similar punishment. However, unlike imprisonment, a stay of execution cannot be granted, so the penalty is always a ‘prison sentence’. Under the Criminal Code, the penalty is ‘less severe than a fine’, but in the course of incarceration in a penal institution, a physical examination is carried out to identify the person to the extent necessary, or if necessary to maintain discipline and order in the penal institution, a physical examination is carried out.

Unlike imprisonment, there is no work, but, as with imprisonment, the warden of the penal institution may permit work to be carried out if the prisoner requests that he or she wishes to do so [5]. Previously, Article 16 of the Criminal Code simply provided that ‘detention shall last not less than one day and not more than 30 days and shall be carried out in the penal institution.’ However, on 17 June 2022, the Law Partially Amending the Penal Code (Law No. 67 of 2022) was promulgated, which newly stipulates in paragraph 2 that ‘Persons sentenced to detention may be allowed to perform necessary work or receive necessary guidance in order to improve and rehabilitate them.’ The law clearly stipulates that.

=== Netherlands ===
Article 9, part 1a of Wetboek van Strafrecht states that there are 4 kinds of primary punishment. Two of them are two kinds of detentions, which are called gevangenisstraf and hechtenis, where the first is a heavier punishment than the second. The two other kinds of punishment is light community service and fines. Prisons are designed in several ways and there are 5 levels of regimes (which depends on the crime committed). Nieuw Vosseveld is a long stay prison with the heaviest regime for the most dangerous criminals. The prison is meant for criminals that have been sentenced to 5 years of imprisonment and longer.

=== Turkey ===
According to the Criminal Procedure Law, detention is restriction of one's freedom temporarily until either he stands trial in court or is set free to go. Contrary to arrest, which is ordered by juridical decision, detention is ordered by prosecution office. Public prosecutor can order detention only if the measure is a requisite for investigation and there is concrete evidence that one is suspicious of a crime.

== See also ==
- Arbitrary arrest and detention
- Civil liberties
- Defence Regulation 18B
- Detention of suspects
- Extrajudicial detention
- Grounding (discipline technique)
- Human rights
- Illegal combatant
- Immigration detention
- Imprisonment
- Legal awareness
- Older prisoners
- Prison reform
- Quasi-criminal
- Remand
- Restorative justice
- Security certificate
- Summary jurisdiction
