= Presiding Officer (ARB) =

United States military administrative title

Every Administrative Review Board, run under the authority of the Office for the Administrative Review of Detained Enemy Combatants, was commanded by a Presiding Officer.

Like the Combatant Status Review Tribunals, also run by OARDEC, the Boards form were modeled after the US Department of Defense's Army Regulation 190-8 Tribunals, but differed in its mandate.

All three procedures consisted of at least three officers, of whom the most senior was to be of field grade.

The AR 1900-8 Tribunals was to set out the details of how the US military was to comply with the US's obligations, under the Third Geneva Convention, to convene a "competent tribunal" to determine the status of captives whose status was in doubt. Competent tribunals, like the AR 190-8 Tribunal, are authorized to determine that captives are innocent civilians, lawful combatants, or combatants who have violated the laws of war. According to the Geneva Conventions, innocent civilians should be immediately released; lawful combatants should enjoy the protections of POW status until hostilities are over; and only those determined to have violated the laws of war can face charges for hostile activity.

The position of the George W. Bush Presidency was that captives apprehended during the "war on terror" were not eligible for the protections of the Geneva Conventions.

The United States Supreme Court ruled, in Rasul v. Bush that captives could not be held indefinitely.

Captives were to receive annual Administrative Review Board hearings, to determine if they continued to pose a threat to the US, or whether they continued to hold any intelligence value.

In practice the Guantanamo Bay detention camp in Cuba contains over one hundred captives who do not receive annual Administrative Review Board hearings, because their Combatant Status Review Tribunal had already been determined not to have been enemy combatants, or because an earlier Administrative Review Board had already determined that they should be released.

== Role of the Presiding Officer ==
The Presiding Officers duties included:

- The Presiding Officer chaired the hearings.
- The Presiding Officer determined when evidence was admissible.
- Presiding Officers would rule when the captive's testimony was off-topic, or when their behaviour was disruptive and they should be removed.
