= Designated Military Officer (ARB) =

One of the official positions that the Office for the Administrative Review of Detained Enemy Combatants appointed to conduct Administrative Review Boards was the Designated Military Officer.

Like the Combatant Status Review Tribunals the Administrative Review Boards are "administrative" procedures, not "judicial" procedures. Captives are told the Tribunals and Boards are not sentencing them to punishment, merely deciding whether the USA continues to have a reason to hold them in extrajudicial detention. So they are not entitled to legal representation.

The Designated Military Officer is responsible for overseeing the preparation of the Summary of Evidence memo, that specifies the factors that favor continued detention, and the factors that favor release or transfer.

The Designated Military Officer is responsible for presenting the "evidence" against the captive.

Designated Military Officers routinely asked Board's Presiding Officer to convene classified sessions, where the captive would not be present, so that they could present classified evidence.
