= Harakat-e-Mulavi =

Militant group in Afghanistan

Harakat-e-Mulavi is a militia group that resisted the Soviet Union during the Soviet occupation of Afghanistan.

== Named in the Seton Hall studies ==
A team of legal scholars, led by Mark Denbeaux, a Professor at Seton Hall University's School of Law, published a series of reports in 2006, based on the documents released by the US Department of Defense. The second report on the Guantanamo detainees, entitled: "Inter- and Intra-Departmental Disagreements About Who Is Our Enemy" documented that the Department of Defense was detaining captives for association with organizations that the Department of Homeland Security did not regard as a threat. While the Department of Homeland Security does not regard membership in Harakat-e-Mulavi, or an association with Harakat-e-Mulavi. as a reason to prevent a traveler from entering the USA, JTF-GTMO analysts regard an alleged association with Harakat-e-Mulavi justifies indefinite extrajudicial detention.

== Abdullah Mujahid and Harakat-e-Mulavi ==
Guantanamo captive Abdullah Mujahid acknowledges that he fought, with Harakat-e-Mulavie, against Afghanistan's Soviet occupiers, during the 1980s. During his Combatant Status Review Tribunal and Administrative Review Board hearings Mujahid faced the allegation that he was still associated with Harakat-e-Mulavi, and that it was fighting Afghanistan's American occupiers in 2003.

Abdullah Mujahid was captured in July 2003 and remained in extrajudicial detention in Guantanamo four years later.
