= Military Police: Enemy Prisoners of War, Retained Personnel, Civilian Internees and Other Detainees =

United States Army regulation

Military Police: Enemy Prisoners of War, Retained Personnel, Civilian Internees and Other Detainees is the full title of a United States Army regulation usually referred to as AR 190-8, that lays out how the United States Army should treat captives.

This document is notable as the United States Supreme Court advised the Department of Defense, in its ruling on Hamdi v. Rumsfeld in 2004, that the Tribunals the DoD convened to review the status of the Guantanamo captives should be modeled after the Tribunals described in AR-190-8.

== The authority of AR 190-8 Tribunals ==
As a signatory to the Geneva Conventions, the United States is obliged to convene a "competent tribunal" to determine the status of any captive "should any doubt arise" as to their proper status.

The Third Geneva Convention states that all captives must be accorded the protections of POW status until a competent tribunal convenes, and determines the captive does not qualify for such status.

- AR-190-8 Tribunals are authorized to confirm that a captive is a lawful combatant, after all, who should continue to be detained as a prisoner of war until hostilities cease.
- AR-190-8 Tribunals are authorized to determine that a captive is an innocent civilian, who should be immediately released.
- AR-190-8 Tribunals are authorized to confirm that a captive is a combatant who acted in a way that he or she should be stripped of POW status. According to the Geneva Conventions, only captives who have been stripped of POW status, by a competent tribunal, can face charges for war crimes they committed in situation of armed conflict.

== Structure of AR-190-8 Tribunals and Combatant Status Review Tribunals compared ==
AR-190-8 Tribunal	Combatant Status Review Tribunal
Authorized to confirm that a captive is a lawful combatant.; Authorized to determine that a captive is an innocent civilian.; Authorized to determine that a combatant should be stripped of the protections of POW status, and can, subsequently, face war crime charges.	Authorized to confirm or dispute earlier, secret determinations that captives are "enemy combatants".; Explicitly not authorized to determine whether captives qualify for the protections of POW status.
Three officers, presided by a field grade officer, make the determination, on the preponderance of the evidence.	Three officers, whose President is a field grade officer, make the determination, on the preponderance of the evidence. One of the officers must be a military lawyer.
Another officer, who does not share in the determination, support the officers making the determination. He or she collates the information the Tribunal bases its decision on. It is preferred that this be a military lawyer.	Two officers, who do not share in the determination, support the officers making the determination.; The Recorder collates the information the Tribunal bases its decision on. The Recorders were military lawyers.; The Personal Representative meets with the captive: explains the Tribunal's procedures; explained that participation was voluntary; goes over the unclassified allegations against the captive, which they would be learning, for the first time; tries to get the captive to share their account of the incidents recorded in the allegations.; determines whether the captive wanted to attend, submit a written statement, or allow the Tribunal to convene without their participation; if the captive doesn't attend, or is disruptive, and is removed, it is the Personal Representative's responsibility to present the captive's version of events.

== June 4, 2007 dismissal of charges against Guantanamo captives ==
On June 4, 2007 Colonel Peter Brownback and Naval Captain Keith J. Allred dismissed all charges against Guantanamo captives Omar Khadr and Salim Ahmed Hamdan, on jurisdictional grounds. They ruled that the Military Commissions Act of 2006 had only authorized the Guantanamo military commissions to charge captives who were classified as "illegal enemy combatants", and since Khadr and Hamdan's Combatant Status Review Tribunals had only made the determination that they were "enemy combatants", their military commissions lacked the jurisdiction to hear the charges.

== See also ==
- Administrative Review Board
- Enemy combatants
- OARDEC
- Unlawful enemy combatants
