= Personal Representative (CSRT) =

The Personal Representative was a position held by an officer in the United States Armed Forces of rank O-4 or above, who served before the Combatant Status Review Tribunals, convened for the captives the United States holds in extrajudicial detention in the Guantanamo Bay detention camps, in Cuba. The position of Personal Representative was abolished when the tribunals were ruled as unconstitutional in Boumediene v. Bush.

== History of the Tribunals ==
Initially United States President George W. Bush asserted that captives taken during the "Global War on Terror":

- Did not qualify for Prisoner of War status, as defined by the Geneva Conventions.
- Were not entitled to the protection of having a "competent tribunal" convened, where their combatant status would be openly reviewed.

This assertion was criticized by many legal scholars, and lawyers who volunteered to represent Guantanamo captives mounted legal challenges in the US Court system. The first legal challenge to be heard before the United States Supreme Court was Rasul v. Bush.

The Supreme Court addressed some aspects of the case. In particular, it ruled that the Guantanamo captives were entitled to an opportunity to hear, and challenge, the allegations the DoD felt justified their continued extrajudicial detention.

Supreme Court Justice Sandra Day O'Connor wrote that the Department of Defense should convene Tribunals similar to those described in Army Regulation 190-8.

Army Regulation 190-8 sets out the procedure officers of the United States armed forces should follow to determine whether captives taken during a war were:

1. lawful combatants, entitled to the protections of POW status.
2. innocent civilian refugees, who should be released immediately.
3. combatants who have acted in a manner that has stripped them of the protections of POW status.

== Responsibilities of the Personal Representative ==
Guantanamo captive's Personal Representatives responsibilities include:

1. Meeting with captive prior to their Tribunal to explain the Combatant Status Review Tribunal procedure to them. Procedure discussed included:
  - explaining that the Tribunals were administrative procedures, not judicial procedures.
  - explaining that captives were entitled to attend every Tribunal session where unclassified evidence was discusses;
  - explaining that captives were not obliged to testify at their Tribunals;
  - explaining that they would have an opportunity to respond to all the unclassified allegations presented at their Tribunal.
  - explaining that they could call upon the testimony of any witnesses they felt could address the allegations they faced, but that their Tribunal's president would then rule whether their witnesses were relevant and reasonably available.
  - explaining that they could call upon any documents they felt could address the allegations they faced, and as with their witness requests, their Tribunal's president would then rule whether those documents were relevant and reasonably available.
2. Having not taken part in capture, holding, interrogation, or previous status determinations outside of the Combatant Status Review Tribunals.

== Criticisms of the performance of the Personal Representative ==
Andy Worthington, author of The Guantanamo Files, singled out the Personal Representatives of two captives who were notably active on their behalf. The names of these officers has not been made public, but the captives they represented were: Farouq Saif and Muhammed Khan Tumani.

== See also ==
- Tribunal President (CSRT)
- Reporter (CSRT)
- Office for the Administrative Review of the Detention of Enemy Combatants
