= Legal advisor (Office for the Administrative Review of the Detention of Enemy Combatants) =

A legal advisor and an assistant legal advisor were part of the Office for the Administrative Review of Detained Enemy Combatants team tasked to conduct Combatant Status Review Tribunals of captives held in extrajudicial detention in the United States Guantanamo Bay detention camps in Cuba.

The identity of the officers who served as the tribunal presidents, the tribunal members, the recorder or the personal representative were kept secret. Fifty-eight unclassified dossiers containing a review of the tribunal's legal sufficiency were separately released under separate Freedom of Information Act requests in 2005, and an additional 121 unclassified dossiers were released in September 2007.

Each tribunal that convened had the summary of evidence memo that contained the allegations against the captive, the transcripts of both the unclassified and classified sessions of the tribunals, and all the exhibits and other documents generated for that captive's tribunal reviewed by the legal advisor, who would then draft a memo in which they stated the conclusions they drew during their "legal sufficiency review". The legal advisors included Commander James R. Crisfield, Commander Teresa A. McPalmer and assistant legal advisor Navy Lieutenant Peter C. Bradford.

== Moazzam Begg's tribunal ==
United Kingdom (UK) citizen Moazzam Begg had requested two witnesses who he felt would substantiate that an employee of the International Committee of the Red Cross had issued him a Geneva Convention Prisoner of War (POW) card. Begg had requested the testimony of the ICRC employees, and of an American officer, who had knowledge of his POW status. His tribunal's president had initially ruled that Begg's witnesses were relevant.

However, the assistant legal advisor convinced her that these witnesses were not relevant, because Combatant Status Review Tribunals were not authorized to determine whether captives were entitled to the protections of prisoner of war status.
