= Department of Defense Directive 2310 =

United States national security policy

DoD Directive 2310 is a policy of the United States of America that concerns the treatment of enemy prisoners, particularly those classified as "unlawful combatants". The directive was modified in September 2006 in response to concerns about inhumane treatment of suspected Al Qaeda terrorists captured during the Iraq War.

- It incorporates prohibitions against cruel, inhumane and degrading treatment.
- Interrogators may not force a detainee to be naked, perform sexual acts or pose in a sexual manner. They may not use hoods or place sacks over a detainee's head or use duct tape over his eyes. They may not beat or electrically shock or burn him or inflict other forms of physical pain, any form of physical pain. They may not use waterboarding. They may not use hypothermia or treatment which might lead to heat injury. They may not perform mock executions. They may not deprive detainees of the necessary food, water and medical care. They may not use dogs in any aspect of interrogations.
