= Lawful enemy combatant =

The term lawful enemy combatant is defined in the Military Commissions Act of 2006; the term is used as an exclusionary term to prevent most of those who qualify under the definition from being an unlawful enemy combatant.

== Definition ==
(2) LAWFUL ENEMY COMBATANT.—The term 'lawful enemy combatant' means a person who is—

(A) a member of the regular forces of a State party engaged in hostilities against the United States;

(B) a member of a militia, volunteer corps, or organized resistance movement belonging to a State party engaged in such hostilities, which are under responsible command, wear a fixed distinctive sign recognizable at a distance, carry their arms openly, and abide by the law of war; or

(C) a member of a regular armed force who professes allegiance to a government engaged in such hostilities, but not recognized by the United States.

== Criticism ==
The definition given in the act - seriously undermining the principle of distinction - seems to face several difficulties. Firstly it is to a substantial extent analogous to the definition of such persons who are to be held as prisoners of war under the Geneva Convention relative to the Treatment of Prisoners of War, and indeed would appear to define those who are to be treated as prisoners of war, but it is missing three of the categories under said convention, categories 4, 5, 6. Furthermore, under Protocol Additional to the Geneva Conventions of 12 August 1949, and relating to the Protection of Victims of International Armed Conflicts (Protocol I), 8 June 1977 there are additional categories given, but to which the United States of America is merely a signatory, since it has not been ratified there.

== See also ==
- Geneva Conventions
- Jus ad bellum
- Jus in bello
