= Detaining Power =

Entity holding someone in detention

A Detaining Power is the country, state, government, or any other jurisdiction which detains, holds, or incarcerates those who are alleged to have committed an offence against this jurisdiction or others (which for whatever reason have not been or will be proven not to be fit to process the detainees in question). In short, anyone who prevents someone from leaving a country or state and may have lawfully arrested and held such persons for a length of time may be referred to as a Detaining Power.

For legal purposes, it is a condition of the 3rd drafting of the Geneva Agreement that a detainee may request that their crimes be proven to justify their incarceration.

At time of submission the Quirin case and the Guantanamo Bay trials are examples of highly disputed Detaining Power in the US and under the US jurisdiction.

== See also ==
- Due process
- Pretrial detention
- Police power
