= Adam Brookes =

Canadian novelist and journalist

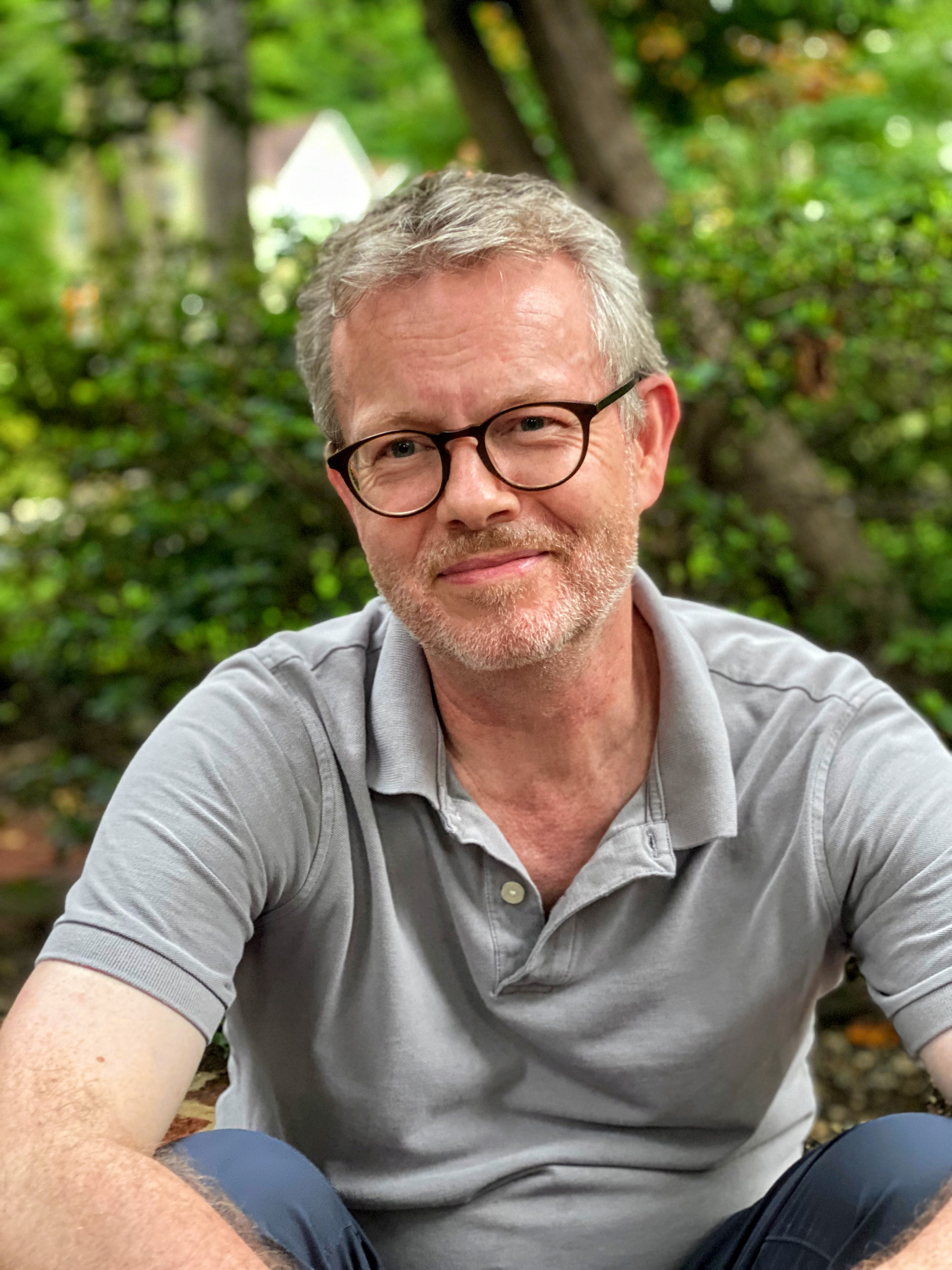
- Born: 1963; Canada
- Education: SOAS University of London
- Occupations: Writer, novelist, journalist
- Notable work: Night Heron, Spy Games, The Spy's Daughter

Adam Brookes is a Canadian-born British–American novelist and journalist. He is the author of multiple spy thriller novels including Night Heron (2014) drawing on his life in journalism and years in China, featuring fictional journalist Philip Mangan. The book received positive reviews from outlets including NPR, The Washington Post, and The Canberra Times. His follow-up novels include Spy Games (2015) and The Spy's Daughter (2017), which along with 'Night Heron' comprise the Philip Mangan book trilogy. The Spy's Daughter received recognition from The Telegraph as one of its 50 Best Books of 2017.

As a journalist in the area of spycraft and foreign relations, he has been a frequent commentator and panelist on military and international affairs.

His 2023 historical nonfiction book Fragile Cargo: The World War II Race to Save the Treasures of China's Forbidden City covers the saga of the relocation of treasures from the National Beijing Palace Museum during World War II, and how they emerged at their final destination of the National Palace Museum in Taiwan.

== Early life and education ==
Brookes was born in Canada and moved to the United Kingdom, growing up in a village in Oxfordshire. He studied Chinese at the School of Oriental and African Studies at the University of London.

Brookes worked as a journalist for the BBC in Indonesia as Jakarta Correspondent. He then worked as BBC's Beijing Correspondent in China for six years before moving to its Washington, D.C. office.

== Published works ==
Philip Mangan Trilogy

- Night Heron (2014)
- Spy Games (2016)
- The Spy’s Daughter (2017)

Non-fiction

- Fragile Cargo: The World War II Race to Save the Treasures of China's Forbidden City (2023)
