= Police power =

Police power may refer to:

- Police power (United States constitutional law)
- Law enforcement agency powers
  - Powers of the police in the United Kingdom
    - Powers of the police in England and Wales
    - Powers of the police in Scotland
  - Police child protection powers in the United Kingdom
- Thimiru Pudichavan, 2018 Indian action drama film, also titled Police Power

== See also ==
- Police
- Police misconduct
- Coercion
- Power (social and political)
- Social influence
