= Unlawful combatant =

Combatant who is deemed not to be protected by the Geneva Conventions

Unlawful combatants (also known as unprivileged combatants or unprivileged belligerents) are civilians who directly engage in armed conflict and are therefore legally (in some, national-level systems) deemed to be no longer protected by the Geneva Conventions. The concept originated during the fin de siècle of the 19th century, with the great powers considering francs-tireurs to be unlawful combatants. During the 20th and 21st centuries, the concept of unlawful combatants has been prominently used by the United States, particularly during the war on terror; it has also seen use by the Israeli and British governments. In the United States, the Military Commissions Act of 2006 codified the legal definition of this term and invested the U.S. President with broad discretion to determine whether a person may be designated an unlawful enemy combatant under United States law.

The International Committee of the Red Cross has criticised the concept of unlawful combatants, pointing out that the terms "unlawful combatant", "illegal combatant" or "unprivileged combatant/belligerent" are not defined in any international agreements. While the concept of an unlawful combatant is included in the Third Geneva Convention, the phrase itself does not appear in the document. Article 4 of the Third Geneva Convention does describe categories under which a person may be entitled to prisoner of war status. There are other international treaties that deny lawful combatant status for mercenaries and children.

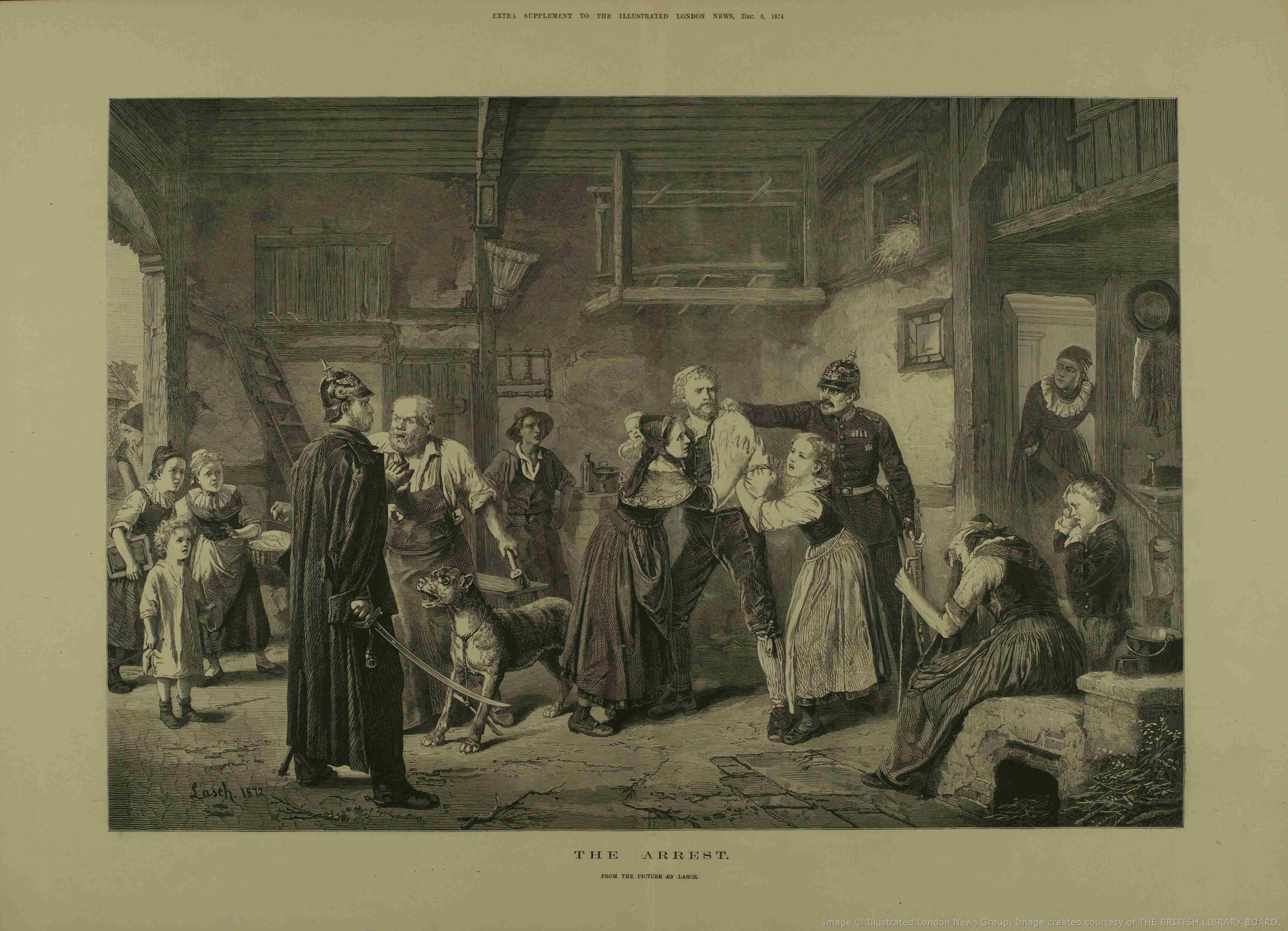
Capture of a Franc-Tireur, by Carl Johann Lasch

The Geneva Conventions apply in wars between two or more opposing sovereign states. They do not apply to civil wars between state forces, whether territorial or third state, and non-state armed groups. A state in such a conflict is legally bound only to observe Common Article 3 of the Geneva Conventions, while all parties continue to be bound by the domestic law of that state. Article 5 of the Third Geneva Convention states that the status of detainees whose combatant status is in doubt should be determined by a competent tribunal. Until such time, they must be treated as prisoners of war. After a competent tribunal has determined that an individual is not a lawful combatant, the detaining power may choose to accord the individual the rights and privileges of a prisoner of war as described in the Third Geneva Convention, but is not required to do so. An individual who is not a lawful combatant, who is not a national of a neutral state living in the belligerent territory, and who is not a national of a co-belligerent state, retains rights and privileges under the Fourth Geneva Convention and must be "treated with humanity and, in case of trial, shall not be deprived of the rights of fair and regular trial".

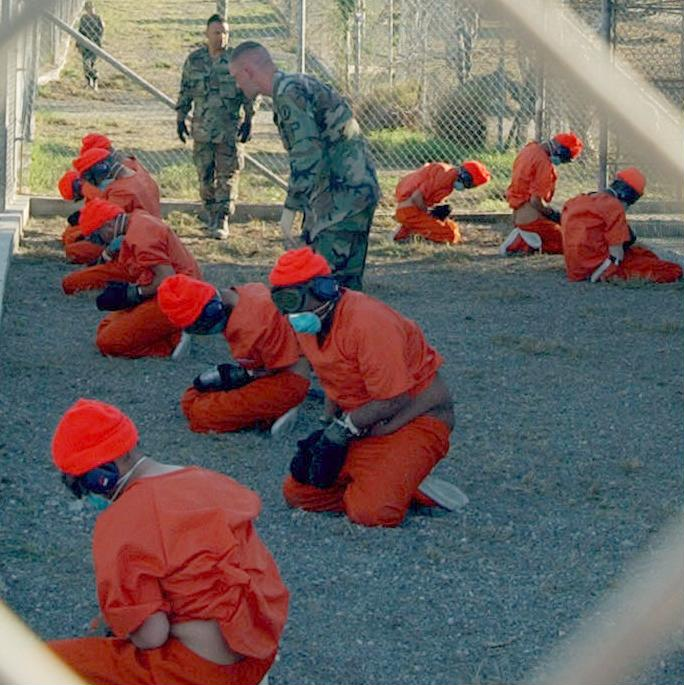
Camp X-Ray, Guantánamo

== Status of combatants in an interstate conflict ==
Under international humanitarian law applicable in an interstate conflict, combatants may be classified into one of two categories: privileged or unprivileged. In that sense, privileged means the retainment of prisoner of war status and impunity for the conduct prior to capture. Thus, combatants that have violated certain terms of the IHL may lose their status and become unprivileged combatants either ipso jure (merely by having committed the act) or by decision of a competent court or tribunal.

In the relevant treaties, the distinction between privileged and unprivileged is not made textually; international law uses the term combatant exclusively in the sense of what is here termed "privileged combatant".

If there is any doubt as to whether the person benefits from combatant status, they must be held as a POW until they have faced a competent tribunal (Article 5 of the Third Geneva Convention (GC III) to decide the issue.

=== Privileged combatants ===
The following categories of combatants qualify for prisoner-of-war status on capture:

1. Members of the armed forces of a Party to the conflict as well as members of militias or volunteer corps forming part of such armed forces.
2. Members of other militias and members of other volunteer corps, including those of organized resistance movements, belonging to a party to the conflict and operating in or outside their own territory, even if this territory is occupied, provided that they fulfill the following conditions:
  - that of being commanded by a person responsible for his subordinates;
  - that of having a fixed distinctive sign recognizable at a distance;
  - that of carrying arms openly;
  - that of conducting their operations in accordance with the laws and customs of war.
3. Members of regular armed forces who profess allegiance to a government or an authority not recognized by the Detaining Power.
4. Inhabitants of a non-occupied territory, who on the approach of the enemy spontaneously take up arms to resist the invading forces, without having had time to form themselves into regular armed units, provided they carry arms openly and respect the laws and customs of war; often dubbed a levée after the mass conscription during the French Revolution.

For countries that have signed the "Protocol Additional to the Geneva Conventions of 12 August 1949, and relating to the Protection of Victims of International Armed Conflicts" (Protocol I), combatants who do not wear a distinguishing mark still qualify as prisoners of war if they carry arms openly during military engagements, and while visible to the enemy when they are deploying to conduct an attack against them.

=== Unprivileged combatants ===
There are several types of combatants who do not qualify as privileged combatants:

- Combatants who would otherwise be privileged but have breached the laws and customs of war (e.g., committing perfidy or killing surrendered enemy combatants). The loss of privileges in that case only occurs upon conviction, i.e. after a competent court has determined the unlawfulness of the conduct in a fair trial.
- Combatants who are captured without the minimum requirements for distinguishing themselves from the civilian population, i.e. carrying arms openly during military engagements and the deployment immediately preceding it, lose their right to prisoner of war status without trial under Article 44 (3) of Additional Protocol I.
- Spies, i.e. persons who collect information clandestinely in the territory of the opposing belligerent. Members of the armed forces conducting reconnaissance or special operations behind enemy lines are not considered spies as long as they wear their own uniform.
- Mercenaries, child soldiers, and civilians who take a direct part in combat and do not fall into one of the categories listed in the previous section.

Most unprivileged combatants who do not qualify for protection under the Third Geneva Convention do so under the Fourth Geneva Convention (GCIV), which concerns protected civilians, until they have had a fair and regular trial. If found guilty at a regular trial, they can be punished under the civilian laws of the detaining power.

== International law and practice ==
=== Interstate conflict ===
The term "unlawful combatant" is a legal term only applicable in interstate conflicts and has been used for the past century in legal literature, military manuals, and case law. However, unlike the terms "combatant", "prisoner of war", and "civilian", the term "unlawful combatant" is not mentioned in either the Hague or the Geneva Conventions. So while the former terms are well understood and clear under international law, the term "unlawful combatant" is not.

At the First Hague Conference, which opened on 6 May 1899, there was a disagreement between the Great Powers—which considered francs-tireurs unlawful combatants subject to execution on capture—and a group of small countries headed by Belgium—which opposed the very principle of the rights and duties of armies of occupation and demanded an unlimited right of resistance for the population of occupied territories. As a compromise, the Russian delegate, F. F. Martens, proposed the Martens Clause, which is included in the preamble to the 1899 Hague Convention II – Laws and Customs of War on Land. Similar wording has been incorporated into many subsequent treaties that cover extensions to humanitarian law.

==== Prisoners of war ====
The Geneva Convention relative to the Treatment of Prisoners of War, 12 August 1949 (GCIII) of 1949 defines the requirements for a captive to be eligible for treatment as a POW. A lawful combatant is a person who commits belligerent acts, and, when captured, is treated as a POW. An unlawful combatant is someone who commits belligerent acts but does not qualify for POW status under GCIII Articles 4 and 5.

Article 4

A. Prisoners of war, in the sense of the present Convention, are persons belonging to one of the following categories, who have fallen into the power of the enemy:

1. Members of the armed forces of a Party to the conflict as well as members of militias or volunteer corps forming part of such armed forces.

2. Members of other militias and members of other volunteer corps, including those of organized resistance movements, belonging to a Party to the conflict and operating in or outside their own territory, even if this territory is occupied, provided that such militias or volunteer corps, including such organized resistance movements, fulfill the following conditions:

(a) That of being commanded by a person responsible for his subordinates;
(b) That of having a fixed distinctive sign recognizable at a distance;
(c) That of carrying arms openly;
(d) That of conducting their operations in accordance with the laws and customs of war.

3. Members of regular armed forces who profess allegiance to a government or an authority not recognized by the Detaining Power.

4. Persons who accompany the armed forces without actually being members thereof, such as civilian members of military aircraft crews, war correspondents, supply contractors, members of labour units or of services responsible for the welfare of the armed forces, provided that they have received authorization from the armed forces which they accompany, who shall provide them for that purpose with an identity card similar to the annexed model.

5. Members of crews [of civil ships and aircraft], who do not benefit by more favourable treatment under any other provisions of international law.

6. Inhabitants of a non-occupied territory, who on the approach of the enemy spontaneously take up arms to resist the invading forces, without having had time to form themselves into regular armed units, provided they carry arms openly and respect the laws and customs of war.

B. The following shall likewise be treated as prisoners of war under the present Convention:

1. Persons belonging, or having belonged, to the armed forces of the occupied country ...

...

Article 5

...

Should any doubt arise as to whether persons, having committed a belligerent act and having fallen into the hands of the enemy, belong to any of the categories enumerated in Article 4, such persons shall enjoy the protection of the present Convention until such time as their status has been determined by a competent tribunal.

These terms thus divide combatants in a war zone into two classes: those in armies and organised militias and the like (lawful combatants), and those who are not. The critical distinction is that a lawful combatant (defined above) cannot be held personally responsible for violations of civilian laws that are permissible under the laws and customs of war; and if captured, a lawful combatant must be treated as a prisoner of war by the enemy under the conditions laid down in the Third Geneva Convention.

If there is any doubt about whether a detained alleged combatant is a lawful combatant then the combatant must be held as a prisoner of war until their status has been determined by a competent tribunal. If that tribunal rules that a combatant is an unlawful combatant then the person's status changes to that of a civilian which may give them some rights under the Fourth Geneva Convention.

==== Persons who are not prisoners of war in an interstate conflict ====
A civilian "in the hands" of the enemy often gains rights through the Geneva Convention Relative to the Protection of Civilian Persons in Time of War, 12 August 1949 (GCIV), if they qualify as a protected person.

Article 4. Persons protected by the Convention are those who, at a given moment and in any manner whatsoever, find themselves, in case of a conflict or occupation, in the hands of a Party to the conflict or Occupying Power of which they are not nationals. Nationals of a State which is not bound by the Convention are not protected by it. Nationals of a neutral State who find themselves in the territory of a belligerent State, and nationals of a co-belligerent State, shall not be regarded as protected persons while the State of which they are nationals has normal diplomatic representation in the State in whose hands they are.

If the individual fulfills the criteria as a protected person, they are entitled to all the protections mentioned in GCIV. Under the meaning of Article 4 of GCVI, civilians under their own national authority and of a state not party to the GCIV are not protected persons. Likewise, neutral nationals living in a belligerent country and allied citizens are not protected persons under GCIV as long their states have normal diplomatic relations with a belligerent power.

If a combatant does not qualify as a POW, then, if he or she qualify as a protected person, he or she receives all the rights which a civilian receives under GCIV, but the party to the conflict may invoke Articles of GCIV to curtail those rights. The relevant Articles are 5 and 42.

Part I. General Provisions

...

Art. 5 Where in the territory of a Party to the conflict, the latter is satisfied that an individual protected person is definitely suspected of or engaged in activities hostile to the security of the State, such individual person shall not be entitled to claim such rights and privileges under the present Convention as would, if exercised in the favour of such individual person, be prejudicial to the security of such State.

Where in occupied territory an individual protected person is detained as a spy or saboteur, or as a person under definite suspicion of activity hostile to the security of the Occupying Power, such person shall, in those cases where absolute military security so requires, be regarded as having forfeited rights of communication under the present Convention.

In each case, such persons shall nevertheless be treated with humanity and, in case of trial, shall not be deprived of the rights of fair and regular trial prescribed by the present Convention. They shall also be granted the full rights and privileges of a protected person under the present Convention at the earliest date consistent with the security of the State or Occupying Power, as the case may be.

...

Section II. Aliens in the territory of a party to the conflict

...

Art. 42. The internment or placing in assigned residence of protected persons may be ordered only if the security of the Detaining Power makes it absolutely necessary.

It is likely that if a competent tribunal under GCIII Article 5 finds they are an unlawful combatant, and if they are a protected person under GCIV, the Party to the conflict will invoke GCIV Article 5. In this case, the unlawful combatant does not have rights under the present Convention as granting them those rights would be prejudicial to the security of the concerned state. They do, however, retain the right "... to be treated with humanity and, in case of trial, shall not be deprived of the rights of fair and regular trial prescribed by the present Convention",

If, after a fair and regular trial, an individual is found guilty of a crime, he or she can be punished by whatever lawful methods are available to the party to the conflict.

If the party does not use Article 5 of GCIV, the party may invoke Article 42 of GCIV and use internment to detain the unlawful combatant.

For those nations that have ratified Protocol I of the Geneva Conventions, are also bound by Article 45.3 of that protocol which curtails GCIV Article 5.

Any person who has taken part in hostilities, who is not entitled to prisoner‑of‑war status and who does not benefit from more favourable treatment in accordance with the Fourth Convention shall have the right at all times to the protection of Article 75 of this Protocol. In occupied territory, any such person, unless he is held as a spy, shall also be entitled, notwithstanding Article 5 of the Fourth Convention, to his rights of communication under that Convention.

===== Mercenaries =====
Under Article 47 of Protocol I (Additional to the Geneva Conventions of 12 August 1949, and relating to the Protection of Victims of International Armed Conflicts) it is stated in the first sentence "A mercenary shall not have the right to be a combatant or a prisoner of war".

On 4 December 1989 the United Nations passed resolution 44/34 the International Convention against the Recruitment, Use, Financing and Training of Mercenaries. It entered into force on 20 October 2001 and is usually known as the UN Mercenary Convention. Article 2 makes it an offence to employ a mercenary and Article 3.1 states that "A mercenary, as defined in article 1 of the present Convention, who participates directly in hostilities or in a concerted act of violence, as the case may be, commits an offence for the purposes of the Convention".

===== Parole violation =====
A combatant who is a POW, and who is subsequently paroled on the condition that he will not take up arms against the belligerent power (or co-belligerent powers) that had held him as a prisoner, is considered a parole violator if he breaks said condition. He is regarded as guilty of a breach of the laws of war, unless there are mitigating circumstances such as coercion by his state to break his parole. As with other combatants, they are still protected by the Third Geneva Convention (GCIII), until a competent tribunal finds them in violation of their parole.

The Geneva Convention (1929) made no mention of parole, but as it was supplemental to the Hague conventions, it relied on the wording of Hague to address this issue. The authors of GCIII, 1949, decided to include a reference with some modification to parole, because during the Second World War, some belligerent countries did permit such release to some extent.

Article 21 of GCIII (1949) reproduces the Articles 10 and 11 of the Hague IV: Regulations Respecting the Laws and Customs of War on Land, 18 October 1907, but did not include Article 12, which provides: "Prisoners of war liberated on parole and recaptured bearing arms against the Government to whom they had pledged their honour, or against the allies of that Government, forfeit their right to be treated as prisoners of war, and can be brought before the courts". Nevertheless, contained in the commentary on GCIII: The only safeguard available to a parole violator—who has been coerced into fighting, and who has been recaptured by the Power that detained him previously—is contained in the procedural guarantees to which he is entitled, pursuant to Article 85 of GCIII.

In the opinion of Major Gary D. Brown, United States Air Force (USAF), this means that "[T]he Hague Convention specified that parole breakers would forfeit their right to be treated as prisoners of war if recaptured. The 1949 Geneva Convention is less direct on the issue. A recaptured parole violator under the Convention would be afforded the opportunity to defend himself against charges of parole breaking. In the interim, the accused violator would be entitled to P[o]W status".

=== Non-interstate conflict ===
Persons not taking part in fighting in a non-interstate conflict are covered by Common Article 3 of the Geneva Conventions:

Article 3

1) Persons taking no active part in the hostilities, including members of armed forces who have laid down their arms and those placed hors de combat by sickness, wounds, detention, or any other cause, shall in all circumstances be treated humanely, without any adverse distinction founded on race, colour, religion or faith, sex, birth or wealth, or any other similar criteria.

...

(d) the passing of sentences and the carrying out of executions without previous judgement pronounced by a regularly constituted court, affording all the judicial guarantees which are recognized as indispensable by civilized peoples.

...

The Parties to the conflict should further endeavour to bring into force, by means of special agreements, all or part of the other provisions of the present Convention.

...

Under Common Article 3 of the Geneva Conventions, persons under physical control or custody by a party to the conflict should be treated humanely, and if tried "sentences must ... be pronounced by a regularly constituted court".

Nations that have ratified Protocol II of the Geneva Conventions are legally bound by Article 6 of the Protocol, which extends how the prosecution of persons should be carried out. For instance, defendants cannot be compelled to testify against themselves and sentenced to capital punishment if they are under the age of 18, pregnant women, or mothers of young children.

Since the status of a non-state armed group is not legally recognized in a non-interstate armed conflict, defendants can be sentenced by the legal system of either the territorial or intervening third state for simply taking part in combat against them. On 7 October 2021, a former Taliban commander was indicted by a federal grand jury in New York for the 26 June 2008 attack on an American military convoy that killed three U.S. soldiers and their Afghan interpreter, and 27 October 2008 shooting down of a U.S. military helicopter during the War in Afghanistan (the conflict became non-interstate not long after the United States invasion of Afghanistan ended on 7 December 2001).

The last time that American and British unlawful combatants were executed, after a regularly constituted court, was the Luanda Trial as mercenaries.

== National law ==
=== United States ===
Two separate issues to be determined in evaluating the category "unlawful combatant" as applied by the government of the United States. One issue is whether such a category can exist without violating the Geneva Conventions, and another issue is, if such a category exists, what steps the US executive branch must take to comply with municipal laws as interpreted by the judicial branch of the federal government.

==== 1942 Quirin case ====
The term unlawful combatant has been used for the past century in legal literature, military manuals and case law. The term "unlawful combatants" was first used in U.S. municipal law in a 1942 United States Supreme Court decision in the case Ex parte Quirin. In that case, the Supreme Court upheld the jurisdiction of a US military tribunal over the trial of eight German saboteurs in the US during World War II:

By universal agreement and practice, the law of war draws a distinction between the armed forces and the peaceful populations of belligerent nations and also between those who are lawful and unlawful combatants. Lawful combatants are subject to capture and detention as prisoners of war by opposing military forces. Unlawful combatants are likewise subject to capture and detention, but in addition they are subject to trial and punishment by military tribunals for acts which render their belligerency unlawful. The spy who secretly and without uniform passes the military lines of a belligerent in time of war, seeking to gather military information and communicate it to the enemy, or an enemy combatant who without uniform comes secretly through the lines for the purpose of waging war by destruction of life or property, are familiar examples of belligerents who are generally deemed not to be entitled to the status of prisoners of war, but to be offenders against the law of war subject to trial and punishment by military tribunals.

The validity of the case as basis for denying prisoners in the war on terrorism the protection of the Geneva Conventions has been disputed. A report by the American Bar Association on the case commented:

The Quirin case, however, does not stand for the proposition that detainees may be held incommunicado and denied access to counsel; the defendants in Quirin were able to seek review and they were represented by counsel. In Quirin, "The question for decision is whether the detention of petitioners for trial by Military Commission... is in conformity with the laws and Constitution of the United States." Quirin, 317 U.S. at 18. Since the Supreme Court has decided that even enemy aliens not lawfully within the United States are entitled to review under the circumstances of Quirin, that right could hardly be denied to U.S. citizens and other persons lawfully present in the United States, especially when held without any charges at all.

— American Bar Association

Since the 1942 Quirin case, the US. signed and ratified the 1949 Geneva Conventions, which are therefore considered to be part of US federal law, in accordance with the Supremacy Clause in the Constitution of the United States. In addition, the US Supreme Court invalidated the premise, in Hamdan v. Rumsfeld, by ruling that Common Article Three of the Geneva Conventions applies to detainees in the war on terror and that the Military Commissions that were used to try suspects were in violation of U.S. and international law.

Congress addressed the issues in the Military Commissions Act of 2006 so that enemy combatants and unlawful enemy combatants might be tried under military commissions; however, on 12 June 2008, the Supreme Court ruled, in Boumediene v. Bush, that Guantanamo Bay captives were entitled to access the US justice system and that the military commissions constituted under the Military Commissions Act of 2006 fell short of what was required of a court under the United States constitution (see the section below for more details).

==== 2001 Presidential military order ====
In the wake of the September 11, 2001 attacks, the US Congress passed a resolution known as the Authorization for Use of Military Force (AUMF) on 18 September 2001. In this, Congress invoked the War Powers Resolution and stated:

That the President is authorized to use all necessary and appropriate force against those nations, organizations, or persons he determines planned, authorized, committed, or aided the terrorist attacks that occurred on 11 September 2001, or harbored such organizations or persons, in order to prevent any future acts of international terrorism against the United States by such nations, organizations or persons.

Using the authorization granted to him by Congress, on 13 November 2001, President Bush issued a Presidential Military Order: "Detention, Treatment, and Trial of Certain Non-Citizens in the War Against Terrorism" which allowed "individuals ... to be detained, and, when tried, to be tried for violations of the laws of war and other applicable laws by military tribunals", where such individuals are members of the organization known as al Qa'ida; or has conspired or committed acts of international terrorism, or have as their aim to cause, injury to or adverse effects on the United States, its citizens, national security, foreign policy, or economy. The order also specifies that the detainees are to be treated humanely.

The length of time for which a detention of such individuals can continue before being tried by a military tribunal is not specified in the military order. The military order uses the term "detainees" to describe the individuals detained under the military order. The U.S. administration chooses to describe the detainees held under the military order as "illegal enemy combatants".

US Secretary of Defense announced Guantanamo Bay detainees would be held as illegal enemy combatants instead of prisoners of war, permitting lack of compliance with the Geneva Conventions. The Bush administration maintained that the terrorists aren’t prisoners of war due to the distinction between unlawful combatant and lawful combatant. Despite this, the administration held that the detainees would be treated in compliance with the Geneva Convention.

With the U.S. invasion of Afghanistan, some lawyers in the Justice Department's Office of Legal Counsel and in the office of White House counsel Alberto Gonzales advised President Bush that he did not have to comply with the Geneva Conventions in handling detainees in the war on terrorism. This applied not only to members of al Qa'ida but the entire Taliban, because, they argued, Afghanistan was a "failed state".

Despite opposition from the U.S. State Department, which warned against ignoring the Geneva Conventions, the Bush administration thenceforth began holding such individuals captured in Afghanistan under the military order and not under the usual conditions of Prisoners of War. For those U.S. citizens detained under the military order, U.S. officials, such as Vice President Dick Cheney, argue that the urgency of the post-9/11 environment called for such tactics in administration's war against terrorism.

Most of the individuals detained by the U.S. military on the orders of the U.S. administration were initially captured in Afghanistan. The foreign detainees are held in the Guantanamo Bay detention camp established for the purpose at the Guantanamo Bay Naval Base, Cuba. Guantanamo was chosen because, although it is under the de facto control of the United States administration, it is not a sovereign territory of the United States, and a previous Supreme Court ruling Johnson v. Eisentrager in 1950 had ruled that U.S. courts had no jurisdiction over enemy aliens held outside the USA.

In Rasul v. Bush, the Supreme Court ruled that "the U.S. Guantanamo Bay, Cuba, Naval Base, which the United States occupies under a lease and treaty recognizing Cuba's ultimate sovereignty, but giving this country complete jurisdiction and control for so long as it does not abandon the leased areas", and that as the United States had complete jurisdiction, the federal courts have the authority under the federal habeas corpus statute to decide whether foreign nationals (non-U.S. citizens) held in Guantanamo Bay were rightfully imprisoned. This ruling largely overturned the judicial advantage for the U.S. administration of using the Naval Base that Johnson v. Eisentrager seemed to have conferred.

==== Legal challenges ====
There have been a number of legal challenges made on behalf of the detainees held in Guantanamo Bay detention camp and in other places. These include:

- On 30 July 2002, the U.S. District Court for the District of Columbia ruled in Rasul v. Bush, that it did not have jurisdiction because Guantanamo Bay Naval Base is not a sovereign territory of the United States. This decision was appealed to the D.C. Circuit Court of Appeals, which upheld the decision, (along with a related case in March 2003 – see Al-Odah v. United States). Rasul v. Bush was appealed to the United States Supreme Court on 2 September 2003.
- On 10 November 2003, the United States Supreme Court announced that it would decide on appeals by Afghan war detainees who challenge their continued incarceration at Guantanamo Bay Naval Base as being unlawful, (See Rasul v. Bush).
- On 10 January 2004, 175 members of both houses of Parliament in the UK filed an amici curiae brief to support the detainees' access to US jurisdiction.
- On 28 June 2004, the Supreme Court ruled in Rasul v. Bush that detainees in Guantanamo Bay Naval Base could turn to U.S. courts to challenge their confinement, but can also be held without charges or trial.
- On 7 July 2004, In response to the Supreme Court ruling, the Pentagon announced that cases would be reviewed by military tribunals, in compliance with Article 5 of the Third Geneva Convention.
- On 8 November 2004, a federal court halted the proceeding of Salim Ahmed Hamdan, 34, of Yemen. Hamdan was to be the first Guantanamo detainee tried before a military commission. Judge James Robertson of the U.S. District Court for the District of Columbia ruled in Hamdan v. Rumsfeld that no competent tribunal had found that Hamdan was not a prisoner of war under the Geneva Conventions.
- By 29 March 2005, all detainees at the Guantanamo Bay Naval Base had received hearings before Combatant Status Review Tribunals. The hearings resulted in the release of 38 detainees, and confirmed the enemy combatant status of 520 detainees. Reuters reported on 15 June 2005 only four detainees had been charged and that Joseph Margulies, one of the lawyers for the detainees said "The (reviews) are a sham ... They mock this nation's commitment to due process, and it is past time for this mockery to end".

Yaser Hamdi was captured in Afghanistan in November 2001. He was taken to Guantanamo Bay Naval Base, but was transferred to jails in Virginia and South Carolina after it became known that he was a U.S. citizen. On 23 September 2004, the United States Justice Department agreed to release Hamdi to Saudi Arabia, where he is also a citizen, on the condition that he gave up his U.S. citizenship. The deal also bars Hamdi from visiting certain countries and to inform Saudi officials if he plans to leave the kingdom. He was a party to a Supreme Court decision Hamdi v. Rumsfeld which issued a decision on 28 June 2004, repudiating the U.S. government's unilateral assertion of executive authority to suspend the constitutional protections of individual liberty of a U.S. citizen. The Court recognized the power of the government to detain unlawful combatants, but ruled that detainees must have the ability to challenge their detention before an impartial judge. Though no single opinion of the Court commanded a majority, eight of the nine justices of the Court agreed that the Executive Branch does not have the power to hold indefinitely a U.S. citizen without basic due process protections enforceable through judicial review.

On 8 May 2002, José Padilla, also known as Abdullah al-Muhajir, was arrested by FBI agents at Chicago's O'Hare International Airport and held as material witness on the warrant issued in New York (state) about the 2001 9/11 attacks. On 9 June 2002 President Bush issued an order to Secretary Rumsfeld to detain Padilla as an "enemy combatant". The order justified the detention by leaning on the AUMF which authorized the President to "use all necessary force against those nations, organizations, or persons" and in the opinion of the administration a U.S. citizen can be an enemy combatant (this was decided by the United States Supreme Court in the case of Ex parte Quirin). Padilla is being detained in Miami and is accused of providing material support for terrorism.

- The 13 November 2001, Military Order, mentioned above, exempts U.S. citizens from trial by military tribunals to determine if they are unlawful combatants, which indicates that Padilla and Yaser Hamdi would end up in the civilian criminal justice system, as happened with John Walker Lindh.
- On 18 December 2003, the Second Circuit Court of Appeals declared that the Bush Administration lacked the authority to detain a U.S. citizen arrested on U.S. soil as an "illegal enemy combatant" without clear congressional authorization (per 18 U.S.C. § 4001(a)); it consequently ordered the government to release Padilla from military custody within thirty days. But agreed that he could be held until an appeal was heard.
- On 20 February 2004, the Supreme Court agreed to hear the government's appeal.
- The Supreme Court heard the case, Rumsfeld v. Padilla, in April 2004, but on 28 June it was thrown out on a technicality. The court declared that New York State, where the case was originally filed, was an improper venue and that the case should have been filed in South Carolina, where Padilla was being held.
- On 28 February 2005, in Spartanburg, South Carolina, U.S. District Judge Henry Floyd ordered the Bush administration to either charge Padilla or release him. He relied on the Supreme Court's ruling in the parallel enemy combatant case of Yaser Hamdi (Hamdi v. Rumsfeld), in which the majority decision declared a "state of war is not a blank check for the president when it comes to the rights of the nation's citizens".
- On 19 July 2005, in Richmond, Virginia, the Fourth Circuit Court of Appeals began hearing the government's appeal of the lower court (the District of South Carolina, at Charleston) ruling by Henry F. Floyd, District Judge, (CA-04-2221-26AJ). Their ruling, decided 9 September 2005, was that "the President does possess such authority pursuant to the Authorization for Use of Military Force Joint Resolution enacted by Congress in the wake of the attacks on the United States of September 11, 2001. Accordingly, the judgment of the district court is reversed".
- In Hamdan v. Rumsfeld (29 June 2006) the U.S. Supreme Court did not rule on the subject of unlawful combatant status but did reaffirm that the U.S. is bound by the Geneva Conventions. Most notably it said that Common Article 3 of the Geneva Convention, regarding the treatment of detainees, applies to all prisoners in the war on terror.

==== Combatant Status Review Tribunal ====
Following the Hamdan v. Rumsfeld-ruling (November 2004) the Bush administration has begun using Combatant Status Review Tribunals to determine the status of detainees. By doing so the obligation under Article 5 of the GCIII was to be addressed.

However, critics maintain these CSRTs are inadequate to warrant acceptance as a competent tribunal. Their principal arguments are:

- The CSRT conducted rudimentary proceedings
- The CSRT afforded detainees few basic protections
- Many detainees lacked counsel
- The CSRT also informed detainees only of general charges against them, while the details on which the CSRT premised enemy combatant status decisions were classified.
- Detainees had no right to present witnesses or to cross-examine government witnesses.

Notable cases pointed to by critics as demonstrating the flawed nature of the procedure include: Mustafa Ait Idir, Moazzam Begg, Murat Kurnaz, Feroz Abbasi, and Martin Mubanga. A comment by legal experts states:

It appears ... that the procedures of the Combatant Status Review Tribunals do not qualify as status determination under the Third Geneva Convention. ... The fact that no status determination had taken place according to the Third Geneva Convention was sufficient reason for a judge from the District Court of Columbia dealing with a habeas petition, to stay proceedings before a military commission. Judge Robertson in Hamdan v. Rumsfeld held that the Third Geneva Convention, which he considered selfexecuting, had not been complied with since a Combatant Status Review Tribunal could not be considered a 'competent tribunal' pursuant to article 5 of the Third Geneva Convention.

James Crisfield, the legal advisor to the Tribunals, offered his legal opinion, that CSRT "do not have the discretion to determine that a detainee should be classified as a prisoner of war – only whether the detainee satisfies the definition of 'enemy combatant'". Determining whether a captive should be classified as a prisoner of war is the sole purpose of a competent tribunal.

Analysis of these Tribunals by two lawyers for Guananamo detainees, Professor Mark P. Denbeaux of the Seton Hall University School of Law, his son Joshua Denbeaux, and some of his law students resulted in a report called No-hearing hearings. In essence it supports the criticism voiced above.

==== Military commissions ====
As of 17 October 2006, when President Bush signed the Military Commissions Act of 2006 into law, Title 10 of the United States Code was amended to include a definition of an "unlawful enemy combatant" as

a person who has engaged in hostilities or who has purposefully and materially supported hostilities against the United States or its co-belligerents who is not a lawful enemy combatant (including a person who is part of the Taliban, al-Qaida, or associated forces); or a person who, before, on, or after the date of the enactment of the Military Commissions Act of 2006, has been determined to be an unlawful enemy combatant by a Combatant Status Review Tribunal or another competent tribunal established under the authority of the President or the Secretary of Defense.

The definition of a lawful enemy combatant is also given, and much of the rest of the law sets out the specific procedures for determining whether a given detainee of the U.S. armed forces is an unlawful enemy combatant and how such combatants may or may not be treated in general and tried for their crimes in particular. Among its more controversial provisions, the law stipulates that a non United States citizen held as an enemy combatant or is awaiting such determination may not seek habeas corpus relief. Such detainees must simply wait until the military convene a detainee status review tribunal (under the procedures described in the Detainee Treatment Act of 2005).

Immediately after Bush signed the Act into law, the U.S. Justice Department notified the U.S. Court of Appeals for the District of Columbia that the Court no longer had jurisdiction over a combined habeas case that it had been considering since 2004. A notice dated the following day listed 196 other pending habeas cases for which it made the same claim.

Of the first three war crimes cases brought against Guantanamo Bay detainees under the Military Commissions Act, one resulted in a plea bargain and the two others were dismissed on jurisdictional grounds.

On 4 June 2007, in two separate cases, military tribunals dismissed charges against detainees who had been designated as "enemy combatants" but not as "unlawful enemy combatants". The first case was that of Omar Khadr, a Canadian who had been designated as an enemy combatant in 2004. Khadr was accused of throwing a grenade during a firefight in Afghanistan in 2002. Colonel Peter Brownback ruled that the military tribunals, created to deal with "unlawful enemy combatants", had no jurisdiction over detainees who had been designated only as "enemy combatants". He dismissed without prejudice all charges against Khadr. Also on 4 June, Captain Keith J. Allred reached the same conclusion in the case of Salim Ahmed Hamdan.

The United States Department of Defense responded by stating: "We believe that Congress intended to grant jurisdiction under the Military Commissions Act to individuals, like Mr. Khadr, who are being held as enemy combatants under existing C.S.R.T. procedures". That position was called "dead wrong" by Specter.

==== Supreme Court ruling on Military Commissions Act of 2006 ====
On 12 June 2008, the Supreme Court ruled, in a 5-4 opinion in Boumediene v. Bush, that Guantanamo captives were entitled to access the US justice system and to habeas relief. The Supreme Court ruled that the Military Commissions Act of 2006 operated as an "unconstitutional suspension" of the writ of habeas corpus. Justice Anthony Kennedy wrote in the majority opinion:

The laws and Constitution are designed to survive, and remain in force, in extraordinary times.

The Court also ruled that the Combatant Status Review Tribunals were "inadequate". Ruth Bader Ginsburg, Stephen Breyer, David Souter and John Paul Stevens joined Kennedy in the majority.

Chief Justice John Roberts, in his dissenting opinion, called the Combatant Status Review Tribunals:

the most generous set of procedural protections ever afforded aliens detained by this country as enemy combatants.

Samuel Alito, Clarence Thomas and Antonin Scalia joined Roberts in the dissent.

Vincent Warren, the executive director of the Center for Constitutional Rights, the organization that initiated the action that triggered the Supreme Court ruling responded:

The Supreme Court has finally brought an end to one of our nation's most egregious injustices. It has finally given the men held at Guantanamo the justice that they have long deserved. By granting the writ of habeas corpus, the Supreme Court recognizes a rule of law established hundreds of years ago and essential to American jurisprudence since our nation's founding. This six-year-long nightmare is a lesson in how fragile our constitutional protections truly are in the hands of an overzealous executive.

==== 2009 ====
In January and February 2009, President Barack Obama's nominees for Attorney General and Solicitor General, Eric Holder and Elena Kagan, both testified they agreed the U.S. government may detain combatants in accordance with the laws of war until the end of the war, (this sidesteps the issue of deciding whether the combatant is a lawful or unlawful combatant and the need to try them). When asked by Senator Lindsey Graham "If our intelligence agencies should capture someone in the Philippines that is suspected of financing Al Qaeda worldwide, would you consider that person part of the battlefield?" Both Holder and Kagan said that they would.

On 28 October 2009, President Obama signed the Military Commissions Act of 2009 into law, which was included in the National Defense Authorization Act for Fiscal Year 2010 (Pub. L. 111–84 (text) (PDF), H.R. 2647, 123 Stat. 2190, enacted October 28, 2009). While critics said it is an improvement over prior versions of military-commissions passed during the Bush administration, it still fails to provide many of the fundamental elements of a fair trial.

=== Other countries ===
Israel, since the 2002 "Imprisonment of Illegal Combatants Law", makes theoretical distinctions between lawful and unlawful combatants and the legal status thereof.

The United Kingdom Crown Prosecution Service (CPS) makes the distinction. The CPS conducted a "through review of the evidence concerning the deaths of Sergeant Steven Roberts of the 2nd Royal Tank Regiment and Mr Zaher Zaher, an Iraqi national, at Az Zubayr, Iraq on 24 March 2003":

In reviewing the case, the CPS lawyer considered the possible view that, because of his behaviour, Mr Zaher had become an unlawful combatant and therefore under the Rules of Engagement, under which the [British] soldiers were required to operate, they would have been entitled to take offensive action against him. Under the Rules of Engagement and the Geneva Convention, unless a person is positively identified as being a combatant, they should be considered a civilian and treated accordingly. As the alternative view would be that Mr Zaher was not an unlawful combatant but a civilian, the reviewing lawyer also considered whether the soldiers could rely on self defence. ...

— Crown Prosecution Service.

== International criticism ==
The designation of some prisoners as unlawful combatants has been the subject of criticism by international human rights institutions; including Amnesty International, Human Rights Watch and the International Committee of the Red Cross.

In response to the U.S.-led military campaign in Afghanistan, a legal advisor at the Legal Division of the ICRC, published a paper on the subject, in which it states:

Whereas the terms "combatant" "prisoner of war" and "civilian" are generally used and defined in the treaties of international humanitarian law, the terms "unlawful combatant", "unprivileged combatants/belligerents" do not appear in them. They have, however, been frequently used at least since the beginning of the last century in legal literature, military manuals and case law. The connotations given to these terms and their consequences for the applicable protection regime are not always very clear.

Human Rights Watch have pointed out that in a judgement, the International Criminal Tribunal for the Former Yugoslavia interpreted the International Committee of the Red Cross, Commentary: IV Geneva Convention Relative to the Protection of Civilian Persons in Time of War (Geneva: 1958) to mean that:

there is no gap between the Third and Fourth Geneva Conventions. If an individual is not entitled to the protection of the Third Convention as a prisoner of war ... he or she necessarily falls within the ambit of [the Fourth Convention], provided that its article 4 requirements [defining a protected person] are satisfied.

This does not mean that the status of unlawful combatant does not exist because in the opinion of the ICRC "If civilians directly engage in hostilities, they are considered 'unlawful' or 'unprivileged' combatants or belligerents ... [and] They may be prosecuted under the domestic law of the detaining state for such action".

Critics of the U.S. internment at Guantanamo Bay worry that the introduction of the unlawful combatant status sets a dangerous precedent for other regimes to follow. When the government of Liberia detained local journalist Hassan Bility in 2002, Liberian authorities dismissed the complaints of the United States, responding that he had been detained as an unlawful combatant.

== See also ==
- Francs-tireurs
- Irregular military
- Targeted killing

USA specific

- Criticism of the war on terror
- Enemy combatant and No longer enemy combatant
- Military Police: Enemy Prisoners of War, Retained Personnel, Civilian Internees and Other Detainees
- Seton Hall reports
- Department of Defense Directive 2310
