= Competent tribunal =

Term used in the Third Geneva Convention

Competent Tribunal is a term used in Article 5 paragraph 2 of the Third Geneva Convention, which states:

Should any doubt arise as to whether persons, having committed a belligerent act and having fallen into the hands of the enemy, belong to any of the categories enumerated in Article 4, such persons shall enjoy the protection of the present Convention until such time as their status has been determined by a competent tribunal.

— Third Geneva Convention Article 5, ¶ 2

== ICRC commentary on competent tribunals ==
The International Committee of the Red Cross (ICRC) commentary on Article 5 of the Third Geneva Convention says on the issue of competent tribunal that:

PARAGRAPH 2. -- PERSONS WHOSE STATUS IS IN DOUBT

This would apply to deserters, and to persons who accompany the armed forces and have lost their identity card.
The provision [was] a new one; it was inserted in the Convention at the request of the International Committee of the Red Cross. The International Committee submitted the following text, which was approved at the Stockholm Conference:

"Should any doubt arise whether any of these persons belongs to one of the categories named in the said Article, that person shall have the benefit of the present Convention until his or her status has been determined by some responsible authority" (10).

At Geneva in 1949, it was first proposed that for the sake of precision the term 'responsible authority' should be replaced by 'military tribunal' (11). This amendment was based on the view that decisions which might have the gravest consequences should Hot [sic] be left to a single person, who might often be of subordinate rank. The matter should be taken to a court, as persons taking part in the fight without the right to do so are liable to be prosecuted for murder or attempted murder, and might even be sentenced to capital punishment (12). This suggestion was not unanimously accepted, however, as it was felt that to bring a person before a military tribunal might have more serious consequences than a decision to deprive him of the benefits afforded by the Convention (13). A further amendment was therefore made to the Stockholm text stipulating that a decision regarding persons whose status was in doubt would be taken by a 'competent tribunal', and not specifically a military tribunal.
Another change was made in the text of the paragraph, as drafted at Stockholm, in order to specify that it applies to cases of doubt as to whether persons having committed a belligerent act and having fallen into the hands of the enemy belong to any of the categories enumerated in Article 4 (14). The clarification contained in Article 4 should, of course, reduce the number of doubtful cases in any future conflict.
It therefore seems to us that this provision should not be interpreted too restrictively; the reference in the Convention to 'a belligerent act' relates to the principle which motivated the person who committed it, and not merely the manner in which the act was committed.

- (10) [(1) p.77] See ' XVIIth International Red Cross Conference, Draft Revised or New Conventions, ' p. 54;
- (11) [(2) p.77] See ' Final Record of the Diplomatic Conference of Geneva of 1949, ' Vol. II-A, p. 388;
- (12) [(3) p.77] Ibid., Vol. III, p. 63, No. 95;
- (13) [(4) p.77] Ibid., Vol. II-B, p. 270;
- (14) [(5) p.77] Ibid., pp. 270-271;

— International Committee of the Red Cross commentary on Article 5

== United States ==
Under U.S. military regulations, a Tribunal would be composed of:

Three commissioned officers; a written record of proceedings; proceedings shall be open with certain exceptions; persons whose status is to be determined shall be advised of their rights at the beginning of their hearings, allowed to attend all open sessions, allowed to call witnesses if reasonably available, and to question those witnesses called by the Tribunal, and to have a right to testify; and a tribunal shall determine status by a preponderance of evidence.

Possible determinations are:

1. Enemy Prisoner of War.
2. Recommended Retained Personnel (RP), entitled to EPW protections, who should be considered for certification as a medical, religious, or volunteer aid society RP.
3. Innocent civilian who should be immediately returned to his home or released.
4. Civilian Internee who for reasons of operational security, or probable cause incident to criminal investigation, should be detained.

=== "Competent tribunals" during the 1991 Gulf War ===
During the 1991 Gulf War, some detainees initially categorized as POWs were found to be innocent civilians who had surrendered to receive free food and lodging. 1,196 tribunals were convened, of which 310 individuals were granted POW status. The remaining 886 detainees "were determined to be displaced civilians and were treated as refugees. No civilian was found to have acted as an unlawful combatant."

=== "Competent tribunals" in the context of the detainees held at Guantanamo Bay ===
This term began to receive a lot of attention when President George W. Bush announced that the United States would follow the Geneva Conventions as it was strictly interpreted, and that the war in Afghanistan did not fall within that purview. As such, President Bush stated that fighters captured in the war in Afghanistan would be treated as "unlawful combatants".

Critics claimed that signatories to the Geneva Conventions, like the United States, are obliged to treat all captured combatants as if they qualified for POW status, until a "competent tribunal" considers their case and determines that they don't qualify for POW status.

The Supreme Court set aside this question in the case of Hamdan v. Rumsfeld. Although it ruled against the Bush administration on the legality of the Guantanamo military commissions, it also determined that these detainees were due the rights accorded under the more limited Common Article 3. It reserved judgement on Article 5 with its competent tribunals.

=== Combatant Status Review Tribunal as competent tribunals ===
Following the 2004 Rasul v. Bush ruling, the Bush administration began using Combatant Status Review Tribunals to determine the status of detainees.

The Bush administration tried to keep secret the identity of all the Guantanamo detainees. But some detainees' identities leaked out. Sympathetic lawyers secured permission from those detainees' families, and mounted legal challenges to try to secure their human rights. The Bush administration lost, and was forced to institute Combatant Status Review Tribunal.

The reviews determined only 38 detainees were not illegal combatants. Then, through some kind of mix-up, Murat Kurnaz's dossier was accidentally declassified. Critics examined its contents. It was hundreds of pages long. All but one of the documents in Kurnaz's dossier established his innocence—established that there was no reason to believe he had any association with terrorism. The lone exception was unsigned, and contained only a vague accusation. This lone memo did not supply any evidence to back up its accusation that Kurnaz was acquainted with a suicide bomber—and the memo didn't even get that suicide bomber's name correctly.

Critics argued that since a single vague accusation had been enough to keep a detainee imprisoned, if one assumed his case was typical, it was reasonable to believe that many other detainees the reviews determined were illegal combatants may have been just as questionable.

Further, the Seton Hall studies conducted by lawyers for detainees found that 92% of detainees in Guantanamo Bay were not "al-Qaeda fighters" and they argue that the CSRT's were severely biased against suspects in favor of determining them unlawful combatants. The study itself reveals that those 92% who are not "al-Qaeda fighters" were deemed to be either other al-Qaeda members or Taliban or members of other affiliated hostile groups.

For this, and other reasons, opponents argued that the Combatant Status Review Tribunals do not constitute a competent tribunal as mandated by the Geneva Convention. The Supreme Court ruled in Hamdan v. Rumsfeld that this was irrelevant, but it also ruled that the CSRT was not legal without congressional authorization. In response the Military Commissions Act was adopted.

== See also ==
- Command responsibility
- Geneva Conventions
- Jus in bello
- UN Charter
- Military Police: Enemy Prisoners of War, Retained Personnel, Civilian Internees and Other Detainees
