= Enemy combatant =

American legal concept

Enemy combatant is a term for a person who, either lawfully or unlawfully, engages in hostilities for the other side in an armed conflict, used by the U.S. government and media during the war on terror. Usually enemy combatants are members of the armed forces of the state with which another state is at war. In the case of a civil war or an insurrection "state" may be replaced by the more general term "party to the conflict" (as described in the 1949 Geneva Conventions Article 3).

After the September 11 attacks, the term "enemy combatant" was used by the George W. Bush administration to include an alleged member of al-Qaeda or the Taliban being held in detention by the U.S. government. In this sense, "enemy combatant" actually refers to persons the United States regards as unlawful combatants, a category of persons who do not qualify for prisoner-of-war status under the Geneva Conventions. However, unlike unlawful combatants who qualify for some protections under the Fourth Geneva Convention, enemy combatants, under the Bush administration, were not covered by the Geneva Convention. Thus, the term "enemy combatant" has to be read in context to determine whether it means any combatant belonging to an enemy state or non-state actor, whether lawful or unlawful, or if it means an alleged member of al-Qaeda or of the Taliban being detained as an unlawful combatant by the United States.

In the United States on March 13, 2009, the Obama administration announced its abandonment of the Bush administration's use of the term "enemy combatant".

== Change of meaning in the United States ==
In the 1942 Supreme Court of the United States ruling Ex Parte Quirin, the Court uses the terms with their historical meanings to distinguish between unlawful combatants and lawful combatants:

Unlawful combatants are likewise subject to capture and detention, but in addition they are subject to trial and punishment by military tribunals for acts which render their belligerency unlawful. The spy who secretly and without uniform passes the military lines of a belligerent in time of war, seeking to gather military information and communicate it to the enemy, or an enemy combatant who without uniform comes secretly through the lines for the purpose of waging war by destruction of life or property, are familiar examples of belligerents who are generally deemed not to be entitled to the status of prisoners of war, but to be offenders against the law of war subject to trial and punishment by military tribunals. (Emphasis added)

Johnson v. Eisentrager (1950) reaffirmed the idea that the Constitution does not apply to enemy combatants, and that U.S. courts lack jurisdiction over them.

In the wake of the September 11, 2001 attacks the United States Congress passed a resolution known as the Authorization for Use of Military Force Against Terrorists (AUMF) on September 14, 2001, wherein the Congress invoked the War Powers Resolution. Using this authorization granted to him by Congress, on November 13, 2001, President George W. Bush issued a Presidential Military Order: "Detention, Treatment, and Trial of Certain Non-Citizens in the War Against Terrorism". The administration chose to call those who it detained under the Presidential Military Orders "enemy combatants". The Bush administration began using the term in March 2002. William Lietzau, a legal advisor in the Bush administration first proposed using the term. According to Lietzau, America was detaining people not because they were criminals, but because they were the enemy. While the term was not drawn from the Quirin case, the administration looked to Quirin as validation of the term. Since then, the administration has formalized its usage of the term by using it specifically for detained alleged members and supporters of al-Qaida or the Taliban. For example:

Under the provisions of the Secretary of the Navy Memorandum Implementation of Combatant Status Review Tribunal Procedures for Enemy Combatant Detained at Guantanamo Bay Naval Base Cuba ... An enemy combatant has been defined as "an individual who was part of or supporting the Taliban or al Qaida forces, or associated forces that are engaged in hostilities against the United States or its coalition partners. This includes any person who committed a belligerent act or has directly supported hostilities in aid of enemy armed forces."

This lead has been followed by other parts of the Government and some section of the American news media. The result of this new usage means that the term "enemy combatant" has to be read in the context of the article in which it appears as to whether it means a member of the armed forces of an enemy state, or if it means an alleged member of al Qaida held prisoner by the United States.

=== Military Commissions Act ===
Following the Supreme Court's ruling in Hamdan v. Rumsfeld the United States Congress passed the Military Commissions Act of 2006 which contained definitions for lawful and unlawful enemy combatants. The Military Commissions Act mandated that Guantanamo captives were no longer entitled to access the US civil justice system, so all outstanding habeas corpus petitions were stayed.

=== Boumediene v. Bush ===
On June 12, 2008, the United States Supreme Court ruled, in Boumediene v. Bush, that the Military Commissions Act could not remove the right for Guantanamo captives to access the US Federal Court system. And all previous Guantanamo captives' habeas petitions were eligible to be re-instated. The judges considering the captives' habeas petitions would be considering whether the evidence used to compile the allegations that the detainees were enemy combatants justified a classification of "enemy combatant".

=== Following the Supreme Court's Boumediene v. Bush ruling ===
On February 20, 2009, the administration of President Barack Obama sided with the Bush administration's interpretation of law when they argued to bar access to civil courts sought by enemy combatants held at the Bagram Airfield in Afghanistan.

During a hearing on October 23, 2008, US District Court Judge Richard J. Leon commented on the ambiguity of the term "enemy combatant". Farah Stockman, writing in The Boston Globe, quoted Leon's remarks characterizing him as having "lashed out" at Congress and the Supreme Court for leaving the term undefined:

We are here today, much to my dismay, I might add, to deal with a legal question that in my judgment should have been resolved a long time ago. I don't understand, I really don't, how the Supreme Court made the decision it made and left that question open. ... I don't understand how the Congress could let it go this long without resolving.

On October 27, 2008, Leon ruled that the definition of "enemy combatant" he would use was that set forth in the 2004 rules for Combatant Status Review Tribunals.

"Enemy combatant" shall mean an individual who was part of or supporting Taliban or al Qaeda forces, or associated forces that are engaged in hostilities against the United States or its coalition partners. This includes any person who has committed belligerent act or has directly supported hostilities in aid of enemy armed forces.

Defense attorneys for Lakhdar Boumediene and his fellow Bosnians of Algerians descent were pleased with the definition because the DoD had long since dropped the allegation that they had plotted to attack the US Embassy in Sarajevo, and they felt that none of the remaining allegations met Leon's definition.

== Obama presidency abandons the term ==
On March 13, 2009, United States Attorney General Eric Holder issued a statement that the United States had abandoned the Bush administration term "enemy combatant". The statement said, "As we work toward developing a new policy to govern detainees, it is essential that we operate in a manner that strengthens our national security, is consistent with our values, and is governed by law." However, various human rights groups noted it as primarily a symbolic act. As of 2019 the United States continues to hold 40 detainees at the Guantanamo Bay detention camp.

== See also ==
- al-Marri v. Spagone (2009)
- Disarmed Enemy Forces
- Lawful enemy combatant
- Enemy Combatant (book)
