= Administrative Review Board =

United States military regulatory body

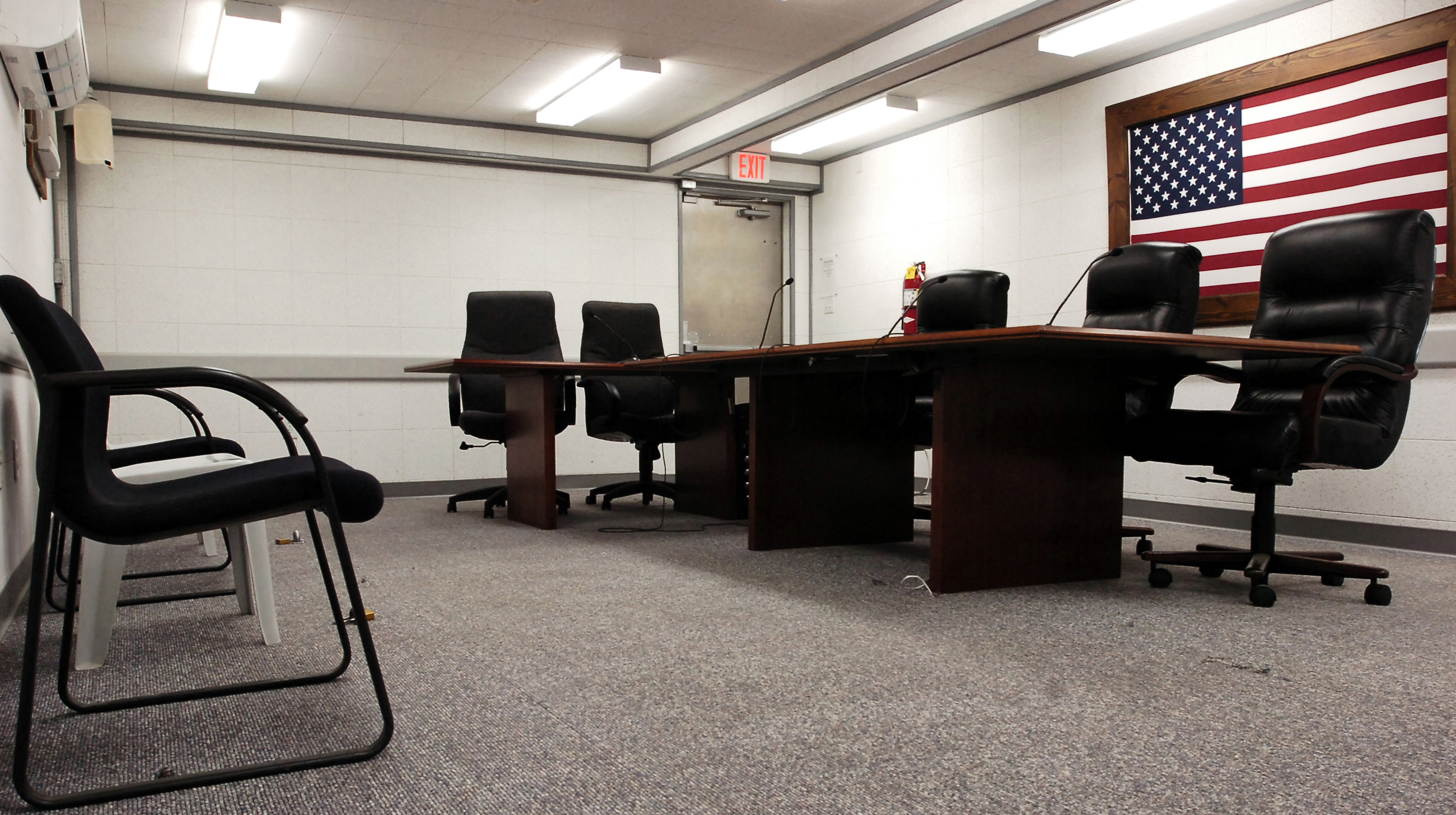
Hearing room where Guantanamo detainee's annual Administrative Review Board hearings convened for those whose Combatant Status Review Tribunal had already determined they were an "enemy combatant".

The Administrative Review Board is a United States military body that conducts an annual review of the detainees held by the United States in Camp Delta at the United States Navy base at Guantanamo Bay, Cuba.

The purpose of the Board is to review whether the detainees still represent a threat. US President George W. Bush initially called the detainees "illegal combatants." But, without a formal announcement of the policy change, the Bush Administration changed their description to "enemy combatant". From July 2004 through March 2005, military authorities conducted a one-time Combatant Status Review Tribunal for each detainee, to confirm whether they had been properly been classified as an "enemy combatant".

The Combatant Status Reviews were criticized by human rights workers because the detainees were not entitled to legal counsel, and did not know what allegations they had to defend themselves against, and the detainees had no presumption of innocence. The ARB was created in an attempt to mitigate the harsh results of potentially indefinite detention by allowing an annual review to determine whether the individual should still be detained.

The Combatant Status Reviews determined that 38 detainees were not illegal combatants after all. They determined that the rest of the detainees had been correctly classified as "enemy combatants" during their original, secret, classifications.

The first set of Administrative Reviews took place between December 14, 2004 and December 23, 2005. The Boards met to consider the cases of al 463 eligible detainees. They recommended the release of 14 detainees, and the repatriation of 120 detainees to the custody of the authorities in their home countries.

As of January 6, 2025, 15 detainees remain at Guantanamo Bay.

The United States Department of Defense (DoD) was under a court order from United States District Court Judge Jed Rakoff to release the names of all the detainees by 6:00 p.m. EST on March 3, 2006. The Department of Defense did not meet this deadline. They delivered a CD-ROM with approximately 5,000 pages of documents at 6:20 pm. DoD had to take that CD-ROM back and issue a second copy that without files that DoD decided not to release.

== Factors for and against continued detention ==
As part of this release of documents the DoD released three files containing summaries of the factors for and against the release of some of the detainees. These documents summarized the factors for and against the continued detention of 120 detainees. These documents contain the detainee's names. The DoD has not explained why they did not comply with Rakoff's court order and release the factors for and against the other 343 detainees.

Some of the factors listed in favour of continued detention for some detainees were repetitions of allegations that had already been refuted during the detainee's Combatant Status Review Tribunals.

== Summarized Transcripts of Administrative Review Board hearings ==
The DoD also released an incomplete set of four files containing summarized transcripts from administrative review board hearings. Over the next six weeks the DoD released 15 more files containing transcripts. Most of these transcripts do not contain the detainees names. However, almost all the transcripts bear the detainee's Guantanamo ID number on the lower right hand corner of each page, and on April 20, 2006, and on May 15, 2006, the DoD released lists of the detainees, with their associated detainee IDs.

In early September 2007 the DoD published additional documents from the second set of Review Board hearings convened in 2006.

Less than twenty percent of the remaining detainees participated in their hearings. The Department only published transcripts of the hearings in which detainees chose to participate.

== Releases ==
According to an article from the International Herald Tribune from April 22, 2006, the ARB had determined three detainees could be released and 107 detainees could be repatriated to the custody of their home country, yet they still remained at Guantanamo. US officials said their continued detention was due to concerns the detainees might be tortured or killed if they were returned or repatriated.

== Observers ==
Very few of the Review Board hearings were observed by members of the press. Adam Brookes of the BBC wrote on April 8, 2005, about being allowed to sit in on the first Administrative Review Board hearing where observers were permitted. He wrote that over sixty Review Board hearings had been convened with no press attendance.
