= Third Geneva Convention =

International treaty on the treatment of prisoners of war (POW)

Convention (III) relative to the Treatment of Prisoners of War.
- Type: Multilateral treaty
- Signed: 12 August 1949
- Location: Geneva, Switzerland
- Effective: 21 October 1950
- Parties: 196 states: Afghanistan; Albania; Algeria; Andorra; Angola; Antigua and Barbuda; Argentina; Armenia; Australia; Austria; Azerbaijan; Bahamas; Bahrain; Bangladesh; Barbados; Belarus; Belgium; Belize; Benin; Bhutan; Bolivia; Bosnia and Herzegovina; Botswana; Brazil; Brunei; Bulgaria; Burkina Faso; Burundi; Cambodia; Cameroon; Canada; Cape Verde; Central African Republic; Chad; Chile; China; Colombia; Comoros; Cook Islands; Costa Rica; Croatia; Cuba; Cyprus; Czech Republic; DR Congo; Denmark; Djibouti; Dominica; Dominican Republic; Ecuador; Egypt; El Salvador; Equatorial Guinea; Eritrea; Estonia; Eswatini; Ethiopia; Federated States of Micronesia; Fiji; Finland; France; Gabon; Georgia; Germany; Ghana; Greece; Grenada; Guatemala; Guinea-Bissau; Guinea; Guyana; Haiti; Holy See; Honduras; Hungary; Iceland; India; Indonesia; Iran; Iraq; Ireland; Israel; Italy; Ivory Coast; Jamaica; Japan; Jordan; Kazakhstan; Kenya; Kiribati; Kuwait; Kyrgyzstan; Laos; Latvia; Lebanon; Lesotho; Liberia; Libya; Liechtenstein; Lithuania; Luxembourg; Madagascar; Malawi; Malaysia; Maldives; Mali; Malta; Marshall Islands; Mauritania; Mauritius; Mexico; Moldova; Monaco; Mongolia; Montenegro; Morocco; Mozambique; Myanmar; Namibia; Nauru; Nepal; Netherlands; New Zealand; Nicaragua; Niger; Nigeria; North Korea; North Macedonia; Norway; Oman; Pakistan; Palau; Palestine; Panama; Papua New Guinea; Paraguay; Peru; Philippines; Poland; Portugal; Qatar; Congo; Romania; Russia; Rwanda; Saint Kitts and Nevis; Saint Lucia; Saint Vincent and the Grenadines; Samoa; San Marino; São Tomé and Príncipe; Saudi Arabia; Senegal; Serbia; Seychelles; Sierra Leone; Singapore; Slovakia; Slovenia; Solomon Islands; Somalia; South Africa; South Korea; South Sudan; Spain; Sri Lanka; Sudan; Suriname; Sweden; Switzerland; Syria; Tajikistan; Tanzania; Thailand; Gambia; Timor-Leste; Togo; Tonga; Trinidad and Tobago; Tunisia; Turkey; Turkmenistan; Tuvalu; Uganda; Ukraine; United Arab Emirates; United Kingdom; United States; Uruguay; Uzbekistan; Vanuatu; Venezuela; Vietnam; Yemen; Zambia; Zimbabwe
- Depositary: Swiss Federal Council

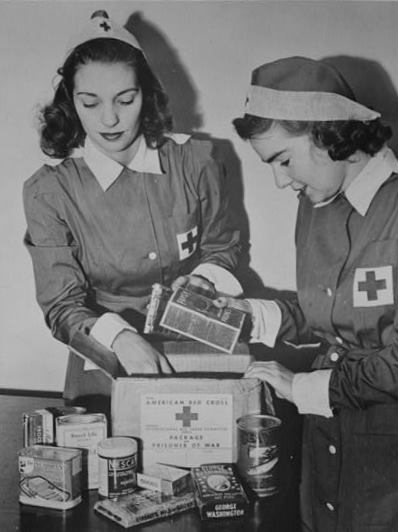
Red Cross workers preparing food packages for prisoners of war

The Geneva Convention (III) relative to the Treatment of Prisoners of War, more commonly referred to as the Third Geneva Convention or Geneva Convention III and abbreviated as GCIII, is one of the four treaties of the 1949 Geneva Conventions. It was first adopted in 1929, but was significantly revised at the 1949 conference on 12 August 1949. GCIII defines humanitarian protections for prisoners of war. There are 196 state parties to the convention.

== Part I: General provisions ==
Parties to Geneva Conventions and Protocols: Parties to GC I–IV and P I–III / Parties to GC I–IV and P I–II; Parties to GC I–IV and P I and III / Parties to GC I–IV and P I; Parties to GC I–IV and P III / Parties to GC I–IV and no P

This part sets out the overall parameters of Geneva Convention III:

- Articles 1 and 2 cover which parties are bound by GCIII
- Article 2 specifies when the parties are bound by GCIII
  - That any armed conflict between two or more "High Contracting Parties" is covered by GCIII;
  - That it applies to occupations of a "High Contracting Party";
  - That the relationship between the "High Contracting Parties" and a non-signatory, the party will remain bound until the non-signatory no longer acts under the strictures of the convention. "...Although one of the Powers in conflict may not be a party to the present Convention, the Powers who are parties thereto shall remain bound by it in their mutual relations. They shall furthermore be bound by the Convention in relation to the said Power, if the latter accepts and applies the provisions thereof."
- Article 3 has been called a "Convention in miniature." It is the only article of the Geneva Conventions that applies in non-international conflicts. It describes minimal protections which must be adhered to by all individuals within a signatory's territory during an armed conflict not of an international character (regardless of citizenship or lack thereof): Non-combatants, members of armed forces who have laid down their arms, and combatants who are hors de combat (out of the fight) due to wounds, detention, or any other cause shall in all circumstances be treated humanely, including prohibition of outrages upon personal dignity, in particular humiliating and degrading treatment. The passing of sentences must also be pronounced by a regularly constituted court, affording all the judicial guarantees which are recognised as indispensable by civilised peoples. Article 3's protections exist even if one is not classified as a prisoner of war. Article 3 also states that parties to the internal conflict should endeavour to bring into force, by means of special agreements, all or part of the other provisions of GCIII.
- Article 4 defines prisoners of war to include:
  - 4.1.1 Members of the armed forces of a Party to the conflict and members of militias of such armed forces
  - 4.1.2 Members of other militias and members of other volunteer corps, including those of organised resistance movements, provided that they fulfill all of the following conditions:
    - that of being commanded by a person responsible for his subordinates;
    - that of having a fixed distinctive sign recognisable at a distance (there are limited exceptions to this among countries who observe the 1977 Protocol I);
    - that of carrying arms openly;
    - that of conducting their operations in accordance with the laws and customs of war.
  - 4.1.3 Members of regular armed forces who profess allegiance to a government or an authority not recognised by the Detaining Power.
  - 4.1.4 Civilians who have non-combat support roles with the military and who carry a valid identity card issued by the military they support.
  - 4.1.5 Merchant marine and the crews of civil aircraft of the Parties to the conflict, who do not benefit by more favourable treatment under any other provisions of international law.
  - 4.1.6 Inhabitants of a non-occupied territory, who on the approach of the enemy spontaneously take up arms to resist the invading forces, without having had time to form themselves into regular armed units, provided they carry arms openly and respect the laws and customs of war.
  - 4.3 makes explicit that Article 33 takes precedence for the treatment of medical personnel of the enemy and chaplains of the enemy.
- Article 5 specifies that prisoners of war (as defined in article 4) are protected from the time of their capture until their final repatriation. It also specifies that when there is any doubt whether a combatant belongs to the categories in article 4, they should be treated as such until their status has been determined by a competent tribunal.

== Part II: General Protection of Prisoners of War ==
This part of the convention covers the status of prisoners of war.

Article 12 states that prisoners of war are the responsibility of the state, not the persons who capture them, and that they may not be transferred to a state that is not party to the convention.

Articles 13 to 16 state that prisoners of war must be treated humanely without any adverse discrimination and that their medical needs must be met.

== Part III: Captivity ==
This part is divided into six sections:

Section 1 covers the beginning of captivity (Articles 17–20). It dictates what information a prisoner must give ("surname, first names and rank, date of birth, and army, regimental, personal or serial number"), and interrogation methods that the detaining power may use ("No physical or mental torture, nor any other form of coercion"). It dictates what private property a prisoner of war may keep and that the prisoner of war must be evacuated from the combat zone as soon as possible.

Section 2 covers the internment of prisoners of war and is broken down into 8 chapters which cover:

1. General observations (Articles 21–24)
2. Quarters, food and clothing (Articles 25–28)
3. Hygiene and medical attention (Articles 29–32)
4. The treatment of enemy medical personnel and chaplains retained to assist prisoners of war (Article 33)
5. Religious, intellectual and physical activities (Articles 34–38)
6. Discipline (Articles 39–42)
7. Military rank (Articles 43–45)
8. Transfer of prisoners of war after their arrival in a camp (Articles 46–48)

Section 3 (Articles 49–57) covers the type of labour that a prisoner of war may be compelled to do, taking such factors as rank, age, and sex into consideration, and that which because it is unhealthy or dangerous can only be done by prisoners of war who volunteer for such work. It goes into details about such things as the accommodation, medical facilities, and that even if the prisoner of war works for a private person the military authority remains responsible for them. Rates of pay for work done are covered by Article 62 in the next section.

Section 4 (Articles 58–68) covers the financial resources of prisoners of war.

Section 5 (Articles 69–74) covers the relations of prisoners of war with the exterior. This covers the frequency of which a prisoner of war can send and receive post, including parcels. The Detaining power has the right to censor all mail, but must do so as quickly as possible.

Section 6 covers the relations between prisoners of war and the detaining authorities: it is broken down into three chapters.

1. Complaints of prisoners of war respecting the conditions of captivity (Article 78)
2. Prisoner of war representatives (Articles 79–81). Where there is no senior officer available in a camp the section stipulates that "prisoners shall freely elect by secret ballot, [a representative] every six months". The representative, whether the senior officer or an elected person, acts as a conduit between the authorities of the detaining power and the prisoners.
3. The sub-section on "Penal and disciplinary sanctions" is subdivided into three parts:
  1. General provisions (Articles 82–88)
  2. Disciplinary sanctions (Articles 89–98)
  3. Juridical proceedings (Articles 99–108)

== Part IV: Termination of Captivity ==
This part is divided into three sections:

Section 1 (Articles 109–117) covers the direct repatriation and accommodation in neutral countries.

Section 2 (Articles 118–119) covers the release and repatriation of prisoners of war at the close of hostilities.

Section 3 (Articles 120–121) covers the death of a prisoner of war.

== Part V: Information Bureau and Relief Societies for Prisoners of War ==
The Information Bureau is an organisation that must be set up by the Detaining Power to facilitate the sharing of information by the parties to conflict and neutral powers as required by the various provisions of the Third Geneva Convention. It will correspond freely with "A Central Prisoners of War Information Agency ... created in a neutral country" to act as a conduit with the Power to which the prisoners of war owe their allegiance. The provisions of this part are contained in Articles 122 to 125.

The central prisoners of war information agency was created within the Red Cross.

== Part VI: Execution of the Convention ==
This part is divided into two sections:

Section 1 (Articles 126–132) General provisions.

Section 2 (Articles 133–143) Final provisions.

== See also ==
- Geneva Conventions of 1949
- List of parties to the Geneva Conventions
- Geneva Convention I
- Geneva Convention II
- Geneva Convention IV
- International humanitarian law
- Code of the United States Fighting Force
- Command responsibility
- Unlawful combatant
- War crime
