= Crimmins =

Crimmins, also spelt Crimmin, is a surname of Irish origin. It is an Anglicized version of the Gailge patronymic Ò Cruimín, "descendant of Cruimín". Cruimín is derived from the Gailge word crom "bent, crooked". Notable people with the surname include:

- Alice Crimmins (born 1939), 1960s American murder trial suspect
- Allison Crimmins, American climate scientist
- Barry Crimmins (1953–2018), American comedian
- Bernard Anthony Crimmins (1919–1993), retired offensive lineman in the National Football League
- Bryan Crimmins (1919–1998), Australian rules footballer
- Eileen M. Crimmins, gerontologist and professor
- John D. Crimmins (1844–1917), New York City contractor and philanthropist
- John Crimmin (1859–1945), Irish colonel and Victoria Cross recipient
- John Hugh Crimmins (1919–2007), American diplomat
- Joseph Ray Crimmins (1921–1989), American politician
- Michael Crimmins (born 1974), Irish hurler
- Peter Crimmins (1948–1976), rover for the Hawthorn Football Club
- Roy Crimmins (1929–2014), English jazz musician

== See also ==
- United States v. Crimmins, 1941 legal case
- Thomas A. Crimmins House, Newton, Massachusetts
