= Rescission bill =

US government procedure to revoke funding

United States Congress
- Long title: A bill to rescind budget authority previously provided in appropriation Acts
- Citation: 2 U.S.C. § 688
- Considered by: United States Congress
- Committee responsible: Appropriations (House); Appropriations (Senate)

Summary
- An expedited procedure under the Impoundment Control Act of 1974 allowing the President to propose rescinding previously appropriated funds; eligible rescission bills get fast-track consideration (including protection from a Senate filibuster) and must be acted on within 45 days of continuous session.

A rescission bill is a type of bill in the United States that rescinds funding that was previously included in an appropriations bill. Rescission bills proposed by the President of the United States are considered under an expedited process that cannot be filibustered in the Senate, allowing it to pass with 51 votes instead of 60. The procedure was introduced in 1974 as a replacement for impoundment. It was widely used between its introduction and 2000, but then fell into disuse. It was revived during the Trump administrations, with an unsuccessful proposal in 2018 and a successful proposal in 2025.

== Procedure ==
The rescission process is described in 2 U.S.C. ch. 17B, subch. II. The process begins with the president submitting a rescission proposal to the House Committee on Appropriations and Senate Committee on Appropriations. Each committee has 25 days to approve or disapprove the proposal; if a committee takes no action, the bill becomes subject to a discharge petition. Each House considers the bill under an expedited procedure that prevents a filibuster in the Senate. The bill must be passed within 45 days after the original proposal to be enacted, and the budget authority is delayed during these 45 days.

In practice, rescission proposals have usually been incorporated into larger appropriations bills considered through the normal process rather than passed as standalone bills using the expedited process. In addition to the presidential rescission procedure, Congress may initiate rescissions as part of a normal appropriations bill.

=== Pocket rescissions ===
A pocket rescission is a disputed maneuver where the president submits the rescission proposal on a date less than 45 days before the end of the fiscal year on September 30, in order to circumvent Congress' ability to disapprove the spending cuts. The maneuver is named in analogy to the pocket veto, an unrelated procedure provided for in the U.S. Constitution.

Supporters of the maneuver assert that, because the end of the 45-day spending delay falls in a different fiscal year than that for which the funding was approved, the funds cannot be spent even if Congress does not approve a rescission bill, describing it as a loophole in the Impoundment Control Act. Critics assert that the procedure is not specified in that law and thus still constitutes an illegal impoundment of funds, and violates Congress' constitutional power of the purse. In 2018, the U.S. Government Accountability Office ruled that pocket rescissions were illegal.

== History ==
The rescission process was instituted by the Congressional Budget and Impoundment Control Act of 1974. It was a replacement for the broad impoundment authority that was removed by the bill. The Balanced Budget and Emergency Deficit Control Reaffirmation Act of 1987 prohibited repeatedly submitting identical or similar rescission proposals to extend the 45-day window for delaying the budget authority.

Between 1974 and 2000, presidents submitted 1178 rescission proposals totaling $76 billion, of which Congress accepted 461 totaling $25 billion. The last presidential rescission proposal during this period was made for fiscal year 2000 during the Clinton administration. No presidential rescission proposals were requested during the presidencies of George W. Bush or of Barack Obama, although George W. Bush proposed "cancellations" of funding in the 2007 federal budget through a message that did not use the formal presidential rescission procedure.

The pocket rescission was reported to have last been used in 1977 by President Jimmy Carter, just three years after the Impoundment Control Act was enacted, although it was limited in scope. As early as 1975, the U.S. Government Accountability Office had ruled that "the budget authority is required to be made available for obligation" even after the end of the fiscal year, and stated "in our opinion, having to wait 45 days of continuous session before it can be determined that a proposed rescission has been rejected is a major deficiency in the Impoundment Control Act".

=== Trump administration ===
During his first term, President Donald Trump in April 2018 announced his intention to develop a rescission proposal in response to the large funding increases contained in the Consolidated Appropriations Act, 2018, which had passed the previous month. The proposal was scaled back, however, after pushback by Congressional leadership to include $15 billion in rescissions mainly targeting funds that were already unspent. In June 2018, the bill, the Spending Cuts to Expired and Unnecessary Programs Act (H.R. 3), passed the House 210–206 but failed in the Senate 48–50.

In June 2025, President Trump during his second term made a rescission proposal to cancel $8.3 billion from specific foreign aid programs from the State Department and U.S. Agency for International Development, and $1.1 billion from the Corporation for Public Broadcasting. This bill, the Rescissions Act of 2025, passed the House on June 12. An amended version of the bill passed the Senate on July 17.

In August 2025, President Trump announced he was using the disputed pocket rescission maneuver to cancel an additional $4.9 billion in foreign aid funding. On September 3, a judge of the U.S. District Court for the District of Columbia ruled that the funds are still required to be spent as specified in the appropriations legislation until Congress acts on the rescission proposal. However, on September 9, John Roberts of the U.S. Supreme Court granted an emergency petition staying that order.
