= County of Riverside v. McLaughlin =

- Supreme Court of the United States

Argued January 17, 1991 Decided May 13, 1991
- Full case name: County of Riverside and Cois Byrd, Sheriff of Riverside County, Petitioners v. Donald Lee McLaughlin, et al.
- Citations: 500 U.S. 44 (more) 111 S. Ct. 1661; 114 L. Ed. 2d 49; 1991 U.S. LEXIS 2528; 59 U.S.L.W. 4413; 91 Cal. Daily Op. Service 3503; 91 Daily Journal DAR 5506
- Argument: Oral argument
- Opinion announcement: Opinion announcement

Case history
- Prior: McLaughlin v. County of Riverside, 888 F.2d 1276 (9th Cir. 1989)

Holding
- An individual arrested without a warrant must be given a probable cause determination by a judge within 48 hours (except during extraordinary circumstances).

Court membership
- Chief Justice William Rehnquist Associate Justices Byron White · Thurgood Marshall; Harry Blackmun · John P. Stevens; Sandra Day O'Connor · Antonin Scalia; Anthony Kennedy · David Souter

Case opinions
- Majority: O'Connor, joined by Rehnquist, White, Kennedy, Souter
- Dissent: Marshall, joined by Blackmun, Stevens
- Dissent: Scalia

Laws applied
- U.S. Const. amends. IV, XIV

County of Riverside v. McLaughlin, 500 U.S. 44 (1991), was a United States Supreme Court case which involved the question of within what period of time must a suspect arrested without a warrant (warrantless arrests) be brought into court to determine if there is probable cause for holding the suspect in custody. The majority held that suspects must generally be granted a probable cause determination within 48 hours of arrest. The dissent believed that probable cause hearings should generally be provided much sooner, as soon as the police complete the administrative steps incident to arrest.

== Overview ==
The County of Riverside v. McLaughlin (1991) case was a court case dealing with the interpretation of the Fourth Amendment of the United States Constitution in a probable cause case involving a warrantless arrest. In this instance, the Fourth Amendment is used by the plaintiff(s) to argue that the clause "warrants must be legally justified with probable cause" also applies to warrantless arrests because it was implied that it would be unreasonable, if not unconstitutional, for someone to be arrested without determining probable cause. This United States Supreme Court also used previous precedent derived from previous Supreme Court cases – such as the Gerstein v. Pugh (1975) case – to arrive at their final decision.

This lawsuit was filed in 1987 by the plaintiff – Donald Lee McLaughlin – against the County of Riverside in California. He asked the United States District Court for the Central District of California to issue an injunction ordering that the County stop its policies on warrantless arrests, arguing that the practice may be unconstitutional. Eventually, the County of Riverside appealed the case to the United States Court of Appeals for the Ninth Circuit after the District Court sided with the plaintiff; the Court of Appeals also agreed with the plaintiff's arguments. This case then went before the U.S. Supreme Court. In a 5–4 vote, the Supreme Court justices found that the County of Riverside's practices in regards to warrantless arrests were unconstitutional and ruled that suspects who are arrested without a warrant must be given probable cause hearings within 48 hours. The dissenting justices objected to allowing 48 hours, believing the probable cause hearing should be held as soon as police complete the administrative steps incident to arrest.

== Background ==
In 1987, the plaintiff – Donald Lee McLaughlin – filed a complaint in the United States District Court (Central District of California) against Riverside County. In it, the complaint alleged that he was jailed in the Riverside County Jail without prosecutors (or any law enforcement officials) explaining to him the reasons why he was held (probable cause). McLaughlin requested an order from the judge that would require that defendants and the County provide those who were arrested without warrants probable cause in a reasonable amount of time.

Riverside County responded to this lawsuit by saying that McLaughlin had no legal standing to bring suit against the County because, based on City of Los Angeles v. Lyons (1983), he failed to show that he was going to be subject to unconstitutional actions by the county, such as detention without probable cause. The County requested that the suit be dismissed. During this time, a second amended complaint was accepted (as individuals and class representatives), which added three more plaintiffs – Johnny E. James, Diana Ray Simon, and Michael Scott Hyde – who alleged that law enforcement officials arrested them without a warrant and they were held without probable cause.

In 1989, the plaintiffs requested the District Court judge issue an injunction ordering the County of Riverside to give probable cause hearings to those who were detained more quickly. A delay of up to 48 hours was not generally permissible. The judge granted the request based on the precedent set in the Gerstein case. Riverside County then appealed the case to the U.S. Court of Appeals for the Ninth Circuit; the Ninth Circuit combined the McLaughlin case together with McGregor v. County of San Bernardino (9th Cir. 1989) due to the similarities between the cases, and upheld the injunction on the basis that not providing a probable cause hearing as soon as the administrative steps after arrest were completed violated precedent set by the Gerstein case. The Ninth Circuit noted that the detainees were "in custody and suffering injury as a result of the defendants' allegedly unconstitutional action". This case then went to the U.S. Supreme Court for review.

== Opinion of the Court ==
In a 5–4 vote, the Court ruled that suspects who are arrested without a warrant must be provided a probable cause hearing within 48 hours of their arrest, but need not have their probable cause hearing as soon as police complete the administrative steps incident to arrest. Using the precedent set by the Gerstein case – in which the Supreme Court ruled that Florida's practice of keeping suspects for 30 days without probable cause was unconstitutional – and close interpretation of the Fourth Amendment, they found that the County of Riverside's practice of keeping suspects in lengthy custody without probable cause determination amounted to illegal detention (or held in custody without being charged). Illegal detention would unquestionably violate the unreasonable search and seizure clause of the Fourth Amendment. Withholding probable cause determinations from suspects for longer than 48 hours after arrest, absent exigent circumstances, would violate the Fourth Amendment.

Justice O'Connor, joined by Chief Justice Rehnquist and Justices White, Kennedy and Souter, wrote the opinion of the Court, and cautioned, however, that:

This is not to say that the probable cause determination in a particular case passes constitutional muster simply because it is provided within 48 hours. Such a hearing may nonetheless violate Gerstein if the arrested individual can prove that his or her probable cause determination was delayed unreasonably. Examples of unreasonable delay are delays for the purpose of gathering additional evidence to justify the arrest, a delay motivated by ill will against the arrested individual, or delay for delay's sake. In evaluating whether the delay in a particular case is unreasonable, however, courts must allow a substantial degree of flexibility. Courts cannot ignore the often unavoidable delays in transporting arrested persons from one facility to another, handling late-night bookings where no magistrate is readily available, obtaining the presence of an arresting officer who may be busy processing other suspects or securing the premises of an arrest, and other practical realities.

Where an arrested individual does not receive a probable cause determination within 48 hours, the calculus changes. In such a case, the arrested individual does not bear the burden of proving an unreasonable delay. Rather, the burden shifts to the government to demonstrate the existence of a bona fide emergency or other extraordinary circumstance. The fact that in a particular case it may take longer than 48 hours to consolidate pretrial proceedings does not qualify as an extraordinary circumstance. Nor, for that matter, do intervening weekends. A jurisdiction that chooses to offer combined proceedings must do so as soon as is reasonably feasible, but in no event later than 48 hours after arrest

Justice O'Connor rejected the County of Riverside's claims that "allege personal injury fairly traceable to the defendant's allegedly unlawful conduct and likely to be redressed by the requested relief."; they argued the plaintiffs who were arrested and held without probable cause determination were suffering direct injury (emotional) because they were not given the reasons for their arrest. The ruling stated that any suspects that are arrested without a warrant by law enforcement have to know why they are being arrested (determination of probable cause) from a judge within 48 hours, except by emergency circumstances.

=== Dissent ===
Four justices dissented, in two separate dissenting opinions, objecting to the majority's allowing a 48-hour delay before probable cause is determined: Justice Scalia and Justice Marshall, joined by Justices Blackmun and Stevens. Justice Marshall argued:

In Gerstein v. Pugh, 420 U.S. 103 (1975), this Court held that an individual detained following a warrantless arrest is entitled to a "prompt" judicial determination of probable cause as a prerequisite to any further restraint on his liberty. See id., at 114-116, 125. I agree with Justice Scalia that a probable-cause hearing is sufficiently "prompt" under Gerstein only when provided immediately upon completion of the "administrative steps incident to arrest," id., at 114. See post, at 4-5. Because the Court of Appeals correctly held that the County of Riverside must provide probable cause hearings as soon as it completes the administrative steps incident to arrest, see 888 F. 2d 1276, 1278 (CA9 1989), I would affirm the judgment of the Court of Appeals. Accordingly, I dissent

Justice Marshall's opinion agreed with the Ninth Circuit's view that probable cause hearings must be provided as soon as administrative steps incident to arrest are completed, and should not generally be delayed for up to 48 hours.

Justice Scalia offered a more detailed perspective in his dissent, stating:

Today, however, the Court discerns something quite different in Gerstein. It finds that the plain statements set forth above (not to mention the common-law tradition of liberty upon which they were based) were trumped by the implication of a later dictum in the case which, according to the Court, manifests a "recognition that the Fourth Amendment does not compel an immediate determination of probable cause upon completing the administrative steps incident to arrest." Ante, at 8 (emphasis added). Of course Gerstein did not say, nor do I contend, that an "immediate" determination is required. But what the Court today means by "not immediate" is that the delay can be attributable to something other than completing the administrative steps incident to arrest and arranging for the magistrate – namely, to the administrative convenience of combining the probable-cause determination with other state proceedings. The result, we learn later in the opinion, is that what Gerstein meant by "a brief period of detention to take the administrative steps incident to arrest" is two full days. I think it is clear that the case neither said nor meant any such thing….

…Of course even if the implication of the dictum in Gerstein were what the Court says, that would be poor reason for keeping a wrongfully arrested citizen in jail contrary to the clear dictates of the Fourth Amendment. What is most revealing of the frailty of today's opinion is that it relies upon nothing but that implication from a dictum, plus its own (quite irrefutable because entirely value laden) "balancing" of the competing demands of the individual and the State. With respect to the point at issue here, different times and different places – even highly liberal times and places – have struck that balance in different ways. Some Western democracies currently permit the Executive a period of detention without impartially adjudicated cause. In England, for example, the Prevention of Terrorism Act 1989, 14(4), 5, permits suspects to be held without presentation and without charge for seven days. 12 Halsbury's Stat. 1294 (4th ed. 1989). It was the purpose of the Fourth Amendment to put this matter beyond time, place and judicial predilection, incorporating the traditional common-law guarantees against unlawful arrest. The Court says not a word about these guarantees, and they are determinative. Gerstein's approval of a "brief period" of delay to accomplish "administrative steps incident to an arrest" is already a questionable extension of the traditional formulation, though it probably has little practical effect and can perhaps be justified on de minimis grounds. [n.2] To expand Gerstein, however, into an authorization for 48-hour detention related neither to the obtaining of a magistrate nor the administrative "completion" of the arrest seems to me utterly unjustified. Mr. McLaughlin was entitled to have a prompt impartial determination that there was reason to deprive him of his liberty – not according to a schedule that suits the State's convenience in piggybacking various proceedings, but as soon as his arrest was completed and the magistrate could be procured.

Justice Scalia argued that the Court thought the precedent established in the Gerstein case in regards to issues associated with warrantless arrests was more than enough in determining when probable cause is determined for suspects. He also argued that the court disregarded the guarantees the Fourth Amendment outlined in regards to holding people in custody. Finally, Justice Scalia argued that the Court's further interpretation of the Gerstein case to mandate that law enforcement must determine probable cause in a set amount of time was unnecessary; he felt that it was completely unrelated to clearing arrest-related administrative affairs or assigning a judge to the suspect's case. He also felt that the probable cause determination for suspects arrested without a warrant should be less strict.

== Subsequent developments ==
The basis of County of Riverside v. McLaughlin was used in a dissenting opinion in Powell v. Nevada (1994).
