= Antoine v. Washington =

- Supreme Court of the United States

Argued December 16, 1974 Decided February 19, 1975
- Full case name: Alexander J. Antoine, et ux. v. State of Washington
- Citations: 420 U.S. 194 (more) 95 S. Ct. 944; 43 L. Ed. 2d 129
- Argument: Oral argument

Case history
- Prior: State v. Antoine, 511 P.2d 1351 (Wash. 1973)

Holding
- 1. Treaties and laws must not be construed to the prejudice of Native Americans (Indians).; 2. The Supremacy Clause precludes the application of state game laws to the tribe.; 3. Congress showed no intent to subject the tribe to state jurisdiction for hunting.; 4. While the state can regulate non-Indians in the ceded area, Indians must be exempted from such regulations.

Court membership
- Chief Justice Warren E. Burger Associate Justices William O. Douglas · William J. Brennan Jr. Potter Stewart · Byron White; Thurgood Marshall · Harry Blackmun; Lewis F. Powell Jr. · William Rehnquist

Case opinions
- Majority: Brennan, joined by Burger, White, Marshall, Blackmun, Powell
- Concurrence: Douglas
- Dissent: Rehnquist, joined by Stewart

Laws applied
- U.S. Const. art. VI, § 2

Antoine v. Washington, 420 U.S. 194 (1975), was a United States Supreme Court case in which the Court held that treaties and laws must be construed in favor of Native Americans (Indians); that the Supremacy Clause precludes the application of state game laws to the tribe; that Congress showed no intent to subject the tribe to state jurisdiction for hunting; and while the state can regulate non-Indians in the ceded area, Indians must be exempted from such regulations.

== Background ==
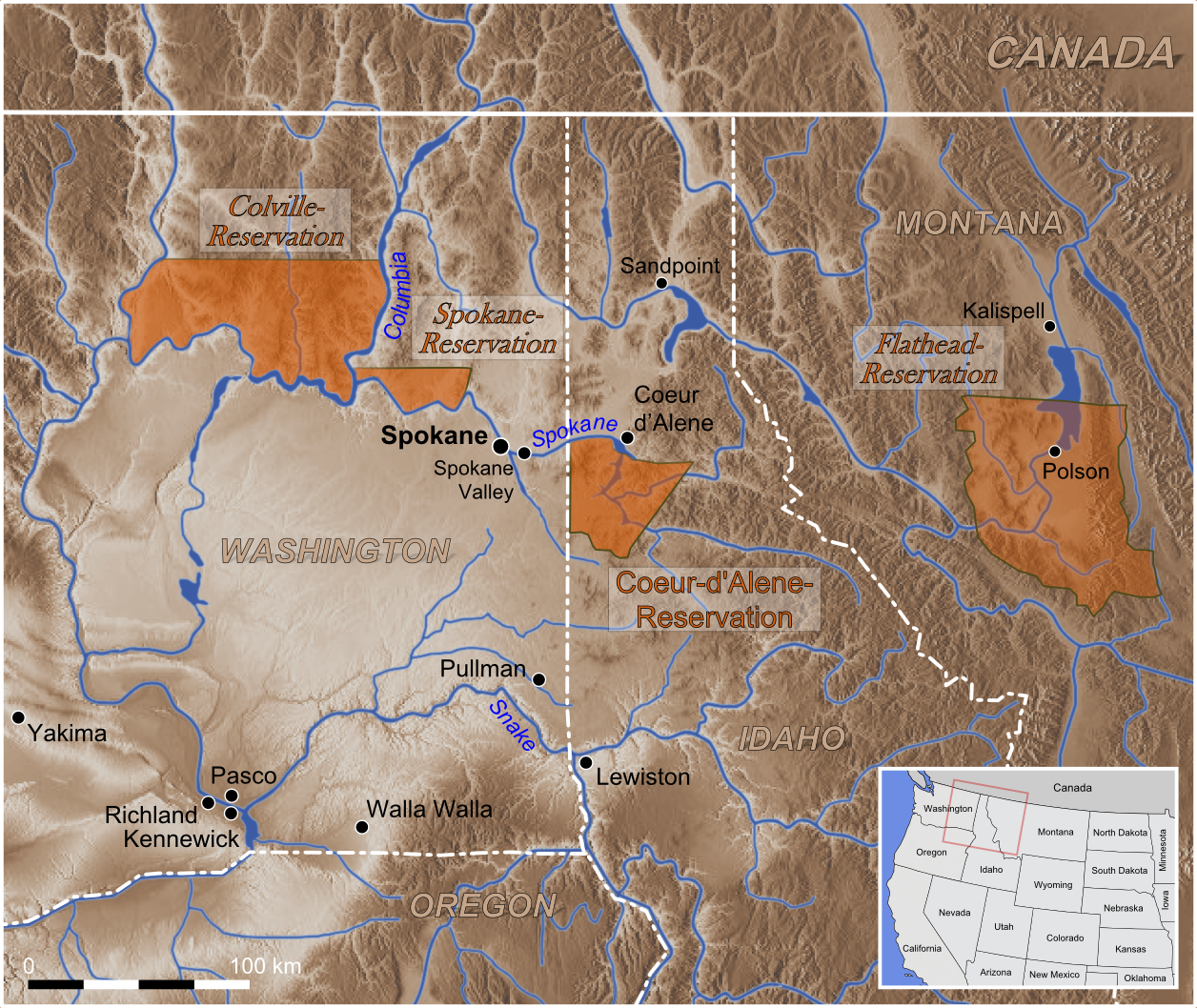
Colville Reservation

=== History ===
The Colville Indian Reservation was established in the north-central part of Washington for members of twelve different tribes of Indians. These tribes were the Chelan, Colville, the Entiat, the Methow, the Nespelem, the Nez Perce of Chief Joseph's Band, the southern Okanagan, the Palus, the Sanpoil, the Sinixt (or "Lakes"), the Sinkiuse-Columbia, and the Wenatchi. The reservation was originally created 1872 by a series of Executive Orders issued by President Ulysses S. Grant and stretched from the Columbia River on the south to the Canada–US border on the north. In 1887, the Dawes Act was passed and the federal government looked at allotting the land on the reservation.

In 1891, an agreement was reached with the tribe that they would cede the northern half of the reservation to the government. As part of the terms of the agreement, Indians in the northern half who did not wish to move to the southern half would be given 80 acres of land. In addition, the United States agreed to pay $1,500,000 to the tribe and the tribe reserved hunting and fishing rights on the ceded land. In 1892, Congress passed an act removing the northern half from tribal jurisdiction, but not implementing all of the agreement. The payment to the tribe was not initially made, but was eventually paid fourteen years later.

=== Lower courts ===
Alexander Antoine was an enrolled member of the Colville Confederated Tribes. In 1971, Antoine and his wife Irene (Note: Irene was also an Indian, but from a Canadian tribe, and was not enrolled in the Colville tribe.) were hunting on the northern half of the former reservation and were cited for hunting deer during a closed season. The Antoines were convicted of hunting and possessing a deer during a closed season in Superior Court. After the conviction, the tribe took up their defense and appealed to the Washington Supreme Court.

At the Washington Supreme Court the tribe and the Antoines argued that Article 6 of the 1891 agreement reserved to tribal members the right to hunt and fish in the ceded northern portion of the reservation. The state of Washington argued that the agreement was not a treaty, but a mere contract. (Note: In 1871, Congress had passed a law prohibiting the making of further treaties with the tribes.) While a treaty was "the supreme law of the land" under the Supremacy Clause, a contract was not, and a contract could not bind someone who was not a party to the contract. Since the state of Washington was not a party to the contract, it could not be bound by the contract and could exercise its police power to regulate hunting and fishing. The court affirmed the convictions. The tribe then appealed the case to the U.S. Supreme Court and it granted certiorari.

== Supreme Court ==
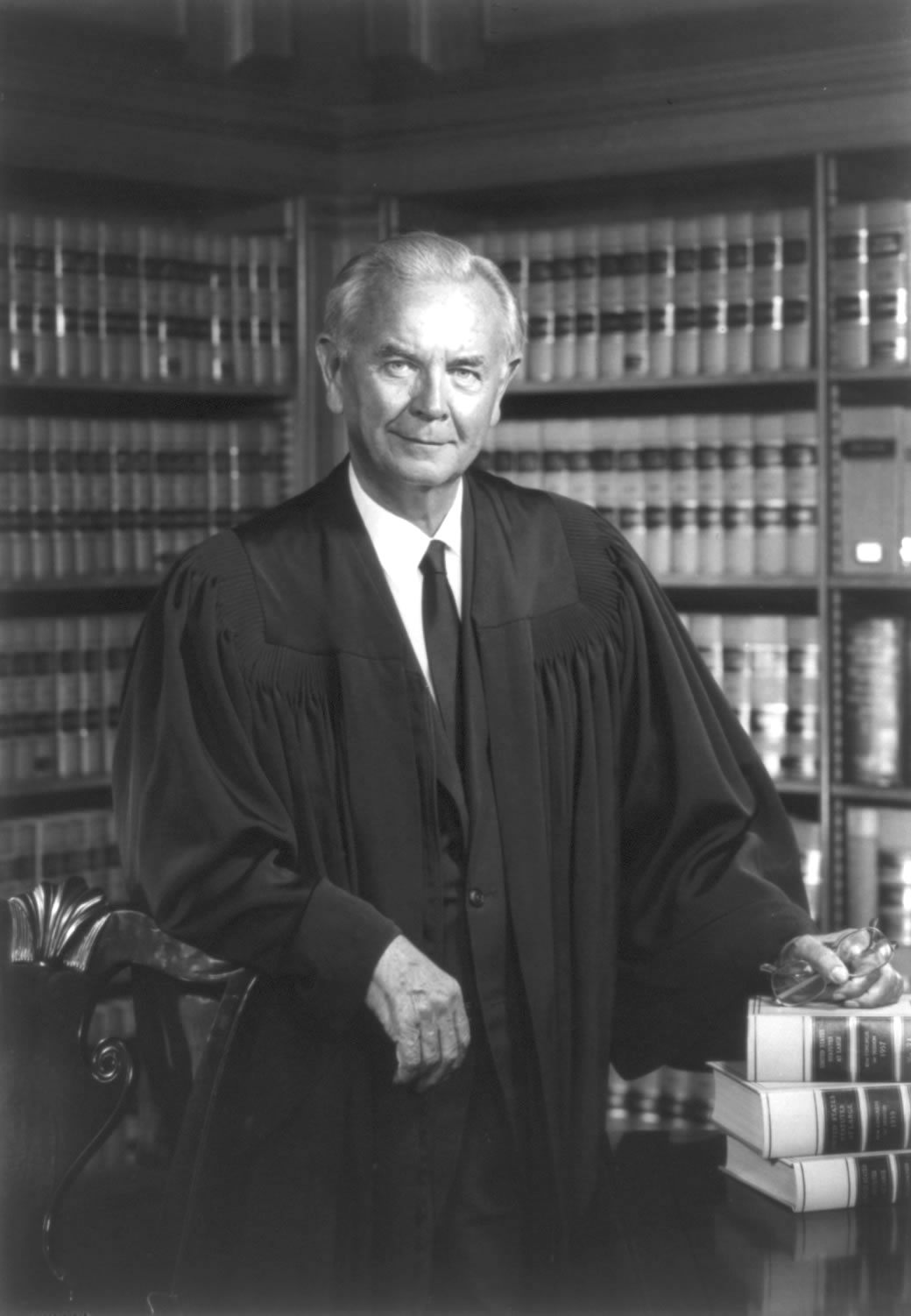
Justice Brennan, author of the majority opinion

=== Arguments ===
The Antoines were represented by Mason D. Morisset of Seattle. Morisset first argued that treaties, laws, and agreements with Indian tribes must be construed in the tribe's favor, according to the Indian canon of construction. Second, when lands are set aside for Indians, the tribe retains hunting and fishing rights unless they are specifically removed, and when the text is silent, the hunting and fishing rights remain, citing Menominee Tribe v. United States. Third, on reservation lands, the state has no authority to regulate hunting. Fourth, the 1891 agreement is covered by the Supremacy Clause because Congress enacted a federal statute relating to Indians, which is binding on the states.

The state was represented by Joseph Lawrence Coniff, Jr., Assistant Attorney General for Washington. The state argued that since the federal government could not enter into a treaty with the Colville tribe, the Supremacy Clause did not apply. Further, the 1891 agreement was a contract, not a treaty, and as a contract could not bind the state since the state was not a party to the contract. Since the northern half was returned to the public domain, Washington had the authority to regulate hunting on the land.

The United States, through Solicitor General Robert Bork filed an amicus curiae brief supporting the position of the Antoines and the tribe.

=== Opinion of the Court ===
Justice William J. Brennan, Jr. delivered the opinion of the court. (Note: Brennan reportedly balked at writing the opinion, believing that it was unimportant.) Brennan began by following Morisset's argument that the Indian canon governed, that agreements must be construed in favor of the tribe, noting that this has been law for over 150 years. Brennan next noted the fallacy of the lower courts position on the Supremacy Clause and the agreement with the tribe. He noted that once Congress passed a statute implementing the agreement, it was law and the Supremacy Clause applied. All the 1871 law did was change the method of dealing with the tribes, but a federal law still governed. Brennan then noted that even though the statute did not explicitly state it reserved hunting and fishing rights for the Indians, it must be construed in that manner since the agreement stated that the rights "shall not be taken away or in anywise abridged." The court reversed the lower court.

=== Concurrence ===
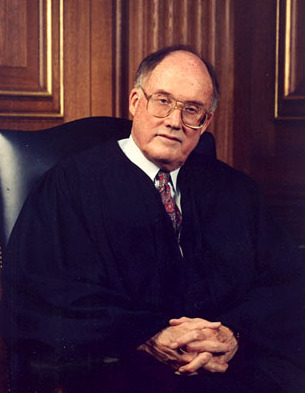
Justice Rehnquist, author of the dissenting opinion

Justice William O. Douglas concurred in the opinion. Douglas summed it up clearly when he said "We have here only an issue involving the power of a State to impose a regulatory restraint upon a right which Congress bestowed on these Indians. Such an assertion of state power must fall by reason of the Supremacy Clause."

=== Dissent ===
Justice William Rehnquist dissented. Rehnquist stated that the Washington hunting regulations and laws could only be affected by a treaty or a statute, not by an agreement between the United States and a tribe. Although the ratifying or enabling act passed, authorizing monies to pay for the land, there was no language in the act about hunting or fishing rights, nor about any of the other twelve articles of the agreement. Rehnquist noted that in every other case where the court held that the congressional act ratified an agreement, Congress had included the language of the agreement in the law.
