= United States v. Bisceglia =

- Supreme Court of the United States

Decided February 19, 1975
- Full case name: United States v. Bisceglia
- Citations: 420 U.S. 141 (more)

Holding
- The Internal Revenue Service has exploratory as well as investigatory powers; the Service may issue a summons when the name of the taxpayer is unknown.

Court membership
- Chief Justice Warren E. Burger Associate Justices William O. Douglas · William J. Brennan Jr. Potter Stewart · Byron White; Thurgood Marshall · Harry Blackmun; Lewis F. Powell Jr. · William Rehnquist

Case opinions
- Majority: Burger
- Concurrence: Blackmun, joined by Powell
- Dissent: Stewart, joined by Douglass

Laws applied
- Internal Revenue Code of 1954 § 7602

United States v. Bisceglia, 420 U.S. 141 (1975), was a United States Supreme Court case in which the Court held that the Internal Revenue Service has exploratory as well as investigatory powers; the Service may issue a summons when the name of the taxpayer is unknown.
