= List of United States Supreme Court cases, volume 420 =

This is a list of all the United States Supreme Court cases from volume 420 of the United States Reports:

| Case name | Citation | Date decided |
|---|---|---|
| Chapman v. Meier | 420 U.S. 1 | 1975 |
| Test v. United States | 420 U.S. 28 | 1975 |
| Daniel v. Louisiana | 420 U.S. 31 | 1975 |
| Train v. City of New York | 420 U.S. 35 | 1975 |
| Emporium Capwell Co. v. W. Addition Comm'y Org. | 420 U.S. 50 | 1975 |
| Harris County Comm's' Court v. Moore | 420 U.S. 77 | 1975 |
| Foster v. Dravo Corp. | 420 U.S. 92 | 1975 |
| Gerstein v. Pugh | 420 U.S. 103 | 1975 |
| Bd. of Sch. Comm'rs v. Jacobs | 420 U.S. 128 | 1975 |
| Train v. Campaign Clean Water, Inc. | 420 U.S. 136 | 1975 |
| Lee v. Thornton | 420 U.S. 139 | 1975 |
| United States v. Bisceglia | 420 U.S. 141 | 1975 |
| Drope v. Missouri | 420 U.S. 162 | 1975 |
| ICC v. Or. Pac. Industries, Inc. | 420 U.S. 184 | 1975 |
| Antoine v. Washington | 420 U.S. 194 | 1975 |
| United States v. ITT Cont'l Baking Co. | 420 U.S. 223 | 1975 |
| NLRB v. J. Weingarten, Inc. | 420 U.S. 251 | 1975 |
| Garment Workers v. Quality Mfg. Co. | 420 U.S. 276 | 1975 |
| Lefkowitz v. Newsome | 420 U.S. 283 | 1975 |
| Utah v. United States | 420 U.S. 304 | 1975 |
| Roe v. Doe | 420 U.S. 307 | 1975 |
| Wood v. Strickland | 420 U.S. 308 | 1975 |
| United States v. Wilson (1975) | 420 U.S. 332 | 1975 |
| United States v. Jenkins | 420 U.S. 358 | 1975 |
| United States v. N.J. Lottery Comm'n | 420 U.S. 371 | 1975 |
| Williams & Wilkins Co. v. United States | 420 U.S. 376 | 1975 |
| Serfass v. United States | 420 U.S. 377 | 1975 |
| Chemehuevi Tribe v. FPC | 420 U.S. 395 | 1975 |
| DeCoteau v. Dist. Cnty. Ct. | 420 U.S. 425 | 1975 |
| Cox Broadcasting Corp. v. Cohn | 420 U.S. 469 | 1975 |
| United States v. Guana-Sanchez | 420 U.S. 513 | 1975 |
| Cassius v. Arizona | 420 U.S. 514 | 1975 |
| United States v. Maine | 420 U.S. 515 | 1975 |
| United States v. Louisiana (1975) | 420 U.S. 529 | 1975 |
| United States v. Florida | 420 U.S. 531 | 1975 |
| Estelle v. Dorrough | 420 U.S. 534 | 1975 |
| Se. Promotions, Ltd. v. Conrad | 420 U.S. 546 | 1975 |
| Burns v. Alcala | 420 U.S. 575 | 1975 |
| Huffman v. Pursue, Ltd. | 420 U.S. 592 | 1975 |
| Reid v. INS | 420 U.S. 619 | 1975 |
| Weinberger v. Wiesenfeld | 420 U.S. 636 | 1975 |
| Austin v. New Hampshire | 420 U.S. 656 | 1975 |
| United States v. Feola | 420 U.S. 671 | 1975 |
| Oregon v. Hass | 420 U.S. 714 | 1975 |
| Lascaris v. Shirley | 420 U.S. 730 | 1975 |
| Cox v. Cook | 420 U.S. 734 | 1975 |
| Schlesinger v. Councilman | 420 U.S. 738 | 1975 |
| Iannelli v. United States | 420 U.S. 770 | 1975 |
| MTM, Inc. v. Baxley | 420 U.S. 799 | 1975 |
| Patterson v. Super. Ct. | 420 U.S. 1301 | 1975 |
