= Charles Swift =

American attorney and Navy officer

LCDR Charles D. Swift
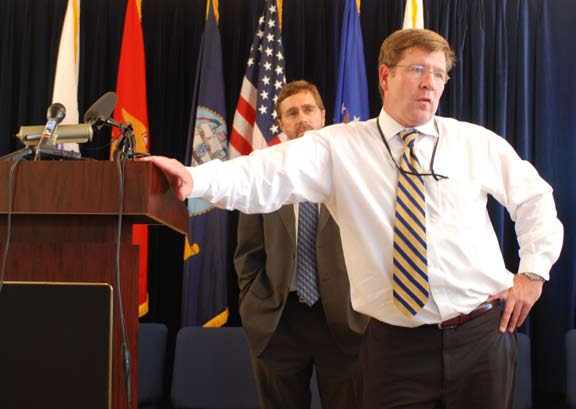
- LCDR Swift (retired) speaking at a press conference.
- Education: U.S. Naval Academy (BS, 1984); Seattle University Law School (JD, 1994); Temple University (LL.M., 2006)
- Military career
- Branch: United States Navy
- Service years: 1980-1991, 1994-2007
- Rank: Lieutenant Commander
- Unit: Judge Advocate General's Corps, U.S. Navy
- Awards: Surface Warfare Badge; Navy Commendation Medal (2 awards); Navy Achievement Medal (6 awards); Navy Expeditionary Medal; Humanitarian Service Medal; Sea Service Ribbon (4 awards)

Charles D. Swift (born 1961) is an American attorney and former career Navy officer, who retired in 2007 as a Lieutenant Commander in the Judge Advocate General's Corps. He is most noted for having served as defense counsel for Salim Ahmed Hamdan, a detainee from Yemen who was the first to be charged at Guantanamo Bay; Swift took his case to the US Supreme Court. In 2005 and June 2006, the National Law Journal recognized Swift as one of the top lawyers nationally because of his work on behalf of justice for the detainees.

Swift used the civil courts to challenge the constitutionality of the military tribunals and the legal treatment of detainees in Hamdan v. Rumsfeld (2006), a case that went to the US Supreme Court and was decided in his client's favor. As a result, Congress passed the Military Commissions Act of 2006 to authorize a form of military tribunals and incorporate the Court's concerns about reconciliation with the US Uniform Code of Military Justice and the Geneva Conventions.

During his Navy career, Swift served in a variety of assignments, including at sea. After several years, he was approved to attend law school and, after graduation, in 1994 became a member of the Navy's legal corps. In 2003, he was assigned to the Department of Defense Office of Military Commissions, serving into early 2007. There he was assigned as defense counsel to Salim Ahmed Hamdan. Because of his challenges, Swift was helping make the law on detainee treatment in the war on terror.

In June 2006, Swift learned he had been "passed over" by the Navy (a second time) for promotion; as a result, under the military's "up or out" system, he had to retire in the spring of 2007. He learned of being passed over two weeks after the Supreme Court decided in Hamdan's favor, and intended to continue defending Hamdan as a civilian.

From 2007 through 2008, Swift taught at Emory Law School as a Visiting Associate Professor and Acting Director of its newly established International Humanitarian Law Clinic. Hamdan was convicted of one of his charges in 2008 but credited for time detained. He was returned to Yemen in 2008. Swift worked to appeal his conviction. In October 2012, Hamdan was acquitted of all charges in the United States Court of Appeals for the District of Columbia Circuit.

In 2014, Swift joined Constitutional Law Center for Muslims in America as its director.

== Early life and education ==
Born in 1961, Charles Swift is a native of Franklin, North Carolina. He went to local schools and gained an appointment and admission to the U.S. Naval Academy.

== Navy career ==
Following his graduation in 1984, Swift served in a variety of surface warfare billets as described in the below table.

In 1991, he left active service to attend Seattle University School of Law, as authorized by the Navy, where he graduated cum laude. Resuming active service in 1994, he joined the Navy's Judge Advocate General's Corps. A comprehensive biography can be found here (website for the Association of Graduates of the United States Military Academy, different from LCDR Swift's commissioning source).

Summary of LCDR Swift's assignments:

Years	Assignments
1985–1987	USS Niagara Falls, Agana, Guam: Damage Control Assistant
1988–1990	USS Rathburne, Pearl Harbor, Hawaii: Navigator
1990–1991	Surface Warfare Department Head School, Newport, Rhode Island: Assistant for International Training
1995–1997	Naval Legal Service Office Northwest
1997–2000	Naval Station Roosevelt Roads, Puerto Rico
2000–2003	Naval Legal Service Detachment, Mayport, Florida
2003–2005	Office of Military Commissions

== US Supreme Court case ==
The US Navy lawyer successfully represented the plaintiff Guantanamo detainee in Hamdan v. Rumsfeld (2006) and took his case to the US Supreme Court. Hamdan, a former driver for Osama bin Laden, was captured during the US invasion of Afghanistan, and held from 2002 at Guantanamo Bay detention camp. He was charged in July 2004 with conspiracy to commit terrorism.

As Hamdan's legal counsel, Swift was assisted in the defense by the Seattle law firm of Perkins Coie and Neal Katyal, a Georgetown University Law Professor. They appealed Hamdan's writ of habeas corpus petition to the US Supreme Court. In Hamdan v. Rumsfeld, 548 U.S. 557, 126 S.Ct. 2749 (2006), the Court ruled that the military commission to try Hamdan was illegal and violated the Geneva Conventions as well as the United States Uniform Code of Military Justice (UCMJ). It held that Congress needed to authorize a process for detainee tribunals. The court ruled that the military commissions as established by the Dept. of Defense were flawed and illegal according to the US Uniform Code of Military Justice and Geneva Convention. As a result, the administration requested, and Congress passed, the Military Commissions Act of 2006, to authorize a form of military tribunals to try the detainee cases. The president signed the law October 17, 2006.

Beginning in 2007, Hamdan was charged under the new law and in 2008 tried by a military jury of the Military Commissions. It acquitted him of conspiracy for terrorism but convicted him of assisting efforts. It sentenced him to five and a half years, crediting him for the time he had already been detained. In November 2008, the US transferred Hamdan to Yemen, where he served the last month of his sentence. After release, he rejoined his family in Sana. In October 2012, the United States Court of Appeals for the District of Columbia overturned the conviction.

== Forced retirement ==
In June 2006, Swift learned that he would be forced to retire from the Navy, as he had not been promoted to commander but "passed over" a second time. The Navy has an "up or out" promotion policy., for a second time had not been selected for promotion. He left the military that spring, the Associated Press reported. Swift said he learned about two weeks after the Hamdan decision that he would not receive a promotion to commander. Media such as The New York Times and Vanity Fair reported that the timing was not a coincidence and suggested it was politically motivated. The Deputy Judge Advocate General of the Air Force, Charles J. Dunlap Jr., later said that suggestion was without evidence.

From fall 2007 to spring 2008, Swift taught at Emory Law School as a Visiting Associate Professor and Acting Director of its newly established International Humanitarian Law Clinic.

== Honors ==
- Swift was the subject of a biographical article in the December 2004 issue of Esquire.
- In December 2005 he was chosen as runner-up "Lawyer of the Year" by the National Law Journal for his challenge to the Guantanamo review tribunals.
- In December 2005 Swift and Lieutenant Colonel Sharon Shaffer were awarded the Joe A. Callaway Award for Civic Courage by the Center for the Study of Responsive Law, in Washington, D.C.
- In June 2006, the National Law Journal named Swift as one of "The 100 most influential lawyers in America."

His decorations and medals include:

- Surface Warfare Badge
- Navy Commendation Medal (2 awards)
- Navy Achievement Medal (6 awards)
- Navy Expeditionary Medal
- Humanitarian Service Medal
- Sea Service Ribbon (4 awards)

== See also ==
- Hamdan v. Rumsfeld
- Matthew Diaz
