= Schlesinger v. Councilman =

- Supreme Court of the United States

Argued December 10, 1974 Decided March 25, 1975
- Full case name: Arthur Schlesinger, Jr., Secretary of Defense, et al. v. Bruce R. Councilman
- Citations: 420 U.S. 738 (more) 95 S. Ct. 1300; 43 L. Ed. 2d 591; 1975 U.S. LEXIS 51; 21 Fed. R. Serv. 2d (Callaghan) 1029

Case history
- Prior: Certiorari to the United States Court of Appeals for the Tenth Circuit

Court membership
- Chief Justice Warren E. Burger Associate Justices William O. Douglas · William J. Brennan Jr. Potter Stewart · Byron White; Thurgood Marshall · Harry Blackmun; Lewis F. Powell Jr. · William Rehnquist

Case opinions
- Majority: Powell, joined by Stewart, White, Blackmun, Rehnquist; Douglas, Brennan, Marshall (part II only)
- Concurrence: Burger
- Concur/dissent: Brennan, joined by Douglas, Marshall

Schlesinger v. Councilman, 420 U.S. 738 (1975), was a case decided by the Supreme Court of the United States.

The case was a key part of government arguments in the 2006 case of Hamdan v. Rumsfeld, defending its contention that the Supreme Court should not have heard the case, because Hamdan was still being processed by a military tribunal court in Guantanamo Bay.

Both the majority opinion by Justice John Paul Stevens and the dissenting argument of Justice Antonin Scalia referenced the case.

== See also ==
- List of United States Supreme Court cases, volume 420
