= Hamdan v. Rumsfeld =

2006 U.S. Supreme Court case

- Supreme Court of the United States

Argued March 28, 2006 Decided June 29, 2006
- Full case name: Salim Ahmed Hamdan, Petitioner v. Donald H. Rumsfeld, United States Secretary of Defense; John D. Altenburg, Jr., Appointing Authority for Military Commissions, Department of Defense; Brigadier General Thomas L. Hemingway, Legal Advisor to the Appointing Authority for Military Commissions; Brigadier General Jay Hood, Commander Joint Task Force, Guantanamo, Camp Echo, Guantanamo Bay, Cuba; George W. Bush, President of the United States
- Docket no.: 05-184
- Citations: 548 U.S. 557 (more) 126 S. Ct. 2749; 165 L. Ed. 2d 723; 2006 U.S. LEXIS 5185; 19 Fla. L. Weekly Fed. S 452
- Argument: Oral argument

Case history
- Prior: Petition for habeas corpus granted, 344 F. Supp. 2d 152 (D.D.C. 2004); reversed, 415 F.3d 33 (D.C. Cir., 2005); cert. granted, 126 S. Ct. 622 (2006)

Questions presented
- (1) Whether the military commission established by the President to try petitioner and others similarly situated for alleged war crimes in the "war on terror" is duly authorized under Congress's Authorization for the Use of Military Force (AUMF), Pub. L. No. 107-40, 115 Stat. 224; the Uniform Code of Military Justice (UCMJ); or the inherent powers of the President? (2) Whether petitioner and others similarly situated can obtain judicial enforcement from an Article III court of rights protected under the 1949 Geneva Convention in an action for a writ of habeas corpus challenging the legality of their detention by the Executive branch?

Holding
- Military commission to try petitioner is illegal and lacking the protections required under the Geneva Conventions and United States Uniform Code of Military Justice.

Court membership
- Chief Justice John Roberts Associate Justices John P. Stevens · Antonin Scalia; Anthony Kennedy · David Souter; Clarence Thomas · Ruth Bader Ginsburg; Stephen Breyer · Samuel Alito

Case opinions
- Majority: Stevens (Parts I through IV, VI through VI–D–iii, VI–D–v, and VII), joined by Kennedy, Souter, Ginsburg, Breyer
- Plurality: Stevens (Parts V and VI–D–iv), joined by Souter, Ginsburg, Breyer
- Concurrence: Breyer, joined by Kennedy, Souter, Ginsburg
- Concurrence: Kennedy (in part), joined by Souter, Ginsburg, Breyer (Parts I and II)
- Dissent: Scalia, joined by Thomas, Alito
- Dissent: Thomas, joined by Scalia; Alito (all but Parts I, II–C–1, and III–B–2)
- Dissent: Alito, joined by Scalia, Thomas (Parts I through III)
- Roberts took no part in the consideration or decision of the case.

Laws applied
- U.S. Const.; Geneva Conventions, Common Arts. 2 & 3; UCMJ, Arts. 21 & 36; Detainee Treatment Act of 2005 (DTA) §1005; AUMF

Hamdan v. Rumsfeld, 548 U.S. 557 (2006), is a United States Supreme Court case holding that military commissions set up by the Bush administration to try detainees at the Guantanamo Bay detention camp violated both the Uniform Code of Military Justice (UCMJ) and the Geneva Conventions ratified by the U.S.

Hamdan raised several legal issues: whether the United States Congress may pass legislation preventing the Supreme Court from hearing the case of an accused combatant before his trial by military commission takes place; whether the special military commissions established by the executive branch violated federal law (including the UCMJ and treaty obligations); and whether courts can enforce the articles of the Geneva Conventions.

After hearing oral arguments on March 28, 2006, the Court issued a 5–3 decision on June 29 holding that it had jurisdiction; that the administration lacked either the constitutional power or congressional authorization to establish these particular military commissions; that, absent such authority, the military commissions had to comply with the "ordinary laws" of the U.S. and of war, which include the UCMJ and the Geneva Conventions incorporated therein; and therefore that Hamdan's trial, having violated the rights and procedures under both bodies of law, was illegal.

== Background ==
Salim Hamdan was a citizen of Yemen who had worked as a bodyguard and chauffeur for Osama bin Laden. Hamdan had formerly worked in Afghanistan on an agricultural project that bin Laden had developed. Hamdan was captured by militia forces during the invasion of Afghanistan in the fall of 2001 and turned over to the United States. In 2002, he was sent by the U.S. to its new Guantanamo Bay detention camp at its naval base in Cuba.

In July 2004, Hamdan was charged with conspiracy to commit terrorism, and the Bush administration made arrangements to try him before a military commission established by the Department of Defense under Military Commission Order No. 1 of March 21, 2002. He was assigned a defense counsel, Lieutenant Commander Charles Swift from the Navy Judge Advocate General's Corps, who with a legal team filed a petition for a writ of habeas corpus for Hamdan in United States District Court, challenging the constitutionality of the military commission and arguing that it lacked the protections required for defendants under the Geneva Conventions and United States Uniform Code of Military Justice.

Following the Supreme Court ruling in Rasul v. Bush (2004), which established that detainees had the right of habeas corpus to challenge their detention, Hamdan was granted a review before the Combatant Status Review Tribunal. It determined that he was eligible for detention by the United States as an enemy combatant or person of interest.

The defendants included many United States government officials allegedly responsible for Hamdan's detention; the short name of the case includes only the first-named defendant, then-Secretary of Defense Donald Rumsfeld.

== District and Appeals Court rulings ==
After reviewing Hamdan's habeas petition, Judge James Robertson of the United States District Court for the District of Columbia ruled in his favor on November 9, 2004. He found that the United States could not hold a military commission unless it was first shown that the detainee was not a prisoner of war.

On July 15, 2005, a United States Court of Appeals for the District of Columbia Circuit three-judge panel of A. Raymond Randolph, John Roberts, and Stephen F. Williams unanimously reversed Judge Robertson's decision. Judge Randolph, who wrote the decision, cited the following reasons for the legality of the military commission:

1. Military commissions were legitimate forums to try enemy combatants because they had been approved by Congress;
2. The Geneva Conventions were a treaty between nations and as such did not confer individual rights and remedies;
3. Even if the Geneva Conventions could be enforced in U.S. courts, they would not be of assistance to Hamdan at the time because the war against al-Qaeda was not between two countries and the Conventions guaranteed only a certain standard of judicial procedure—a "competent tribunal"—without speaking to the jurisdiction in which the prisoner would be tried;
4. Under the terms of the Geneva Conventions, al-Qaeda and its members were not covered;
5. Congress had authorized such activity by statute; and
6. The judicial branch of the United States government could not enforce the Geneva Conventions, invalidating Hamdan's argument that he could not be tried until after his prisoner-of-war status was determined.

== Supreme Court decision ==
On November 7, 2005, the Supreme Court granted certiorari to hear the case. The petition was filed on behalf of Hamdan by Neal Katyal of Georgetown University Law Center and Lieutenant Commander Charles Swift of the U.S. Navy, an alumnus of Seattle University School of Law. The Seattle law firm Perkins Coie provided additional legal counsel for Hamdan.

The case was argued before the court on March 28, 2006. Katyal argued on behalf of Hamdan, and Paul Clement, the solicitor general of the United States, argued on behalf of the government. Chief Justice John Roberts recused himself because he had previously ruled on this case as part of the three judge panel on the United States Court of Appeals for the District of Columbia Circuit. Critics called unsuccessfully for Justice Antonin Scalia to recuse himself as well due to allegedly having made improper comments about the decision of the case prior to hearing oral arguments, such as "I'm not about to give this man who was captured in a war a full jury trial. I mean it's crazy."

The Supreme Court announced its decision on June 29, 2006. The Court reversed the ruling of the Court of Appeals, holding that President George W. Bush did not have authority to set up the war crimes tribunals and finding the special military commissions illegal under both military justice law and the Geneva Conventions.

=== Majority opinion ===
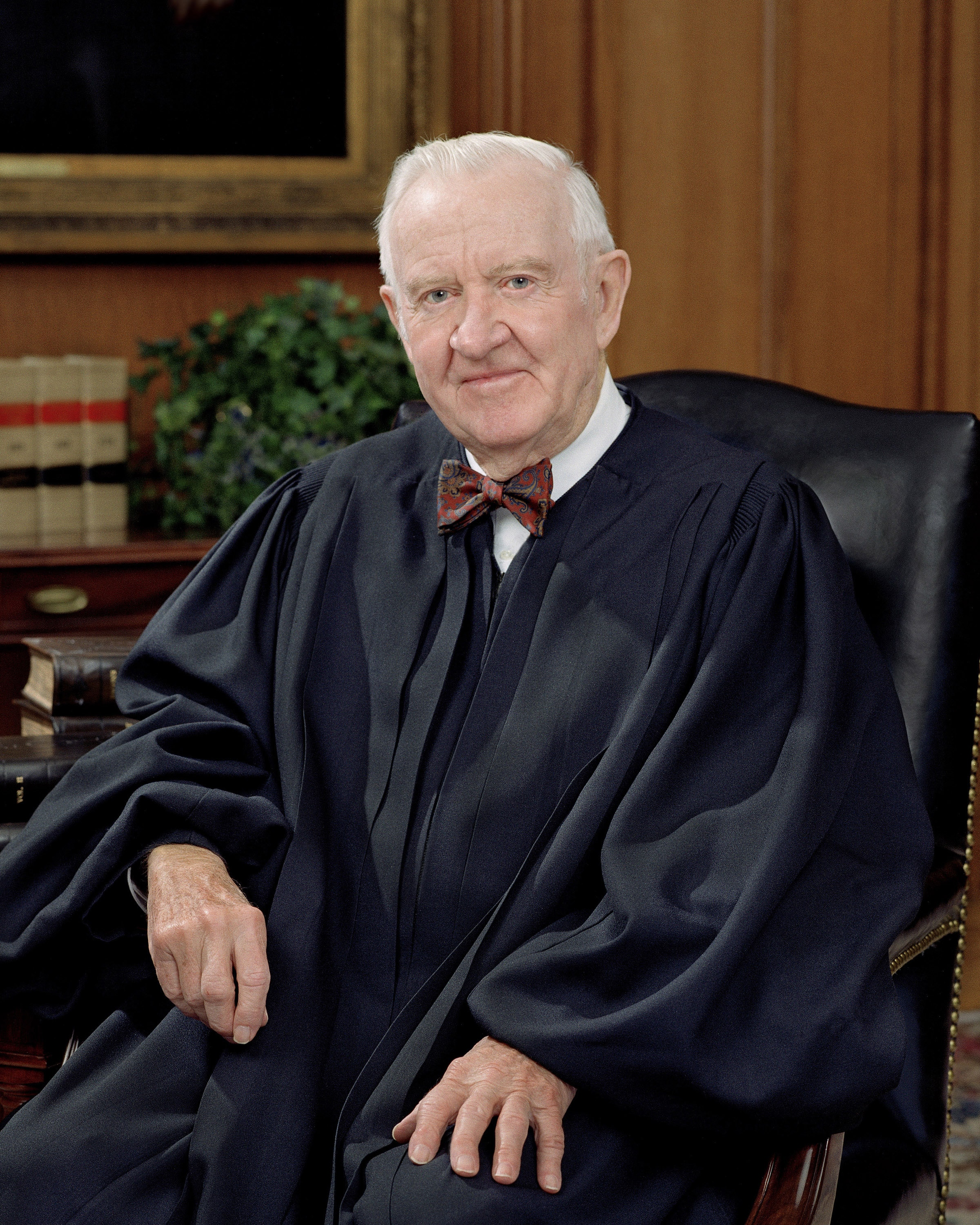
Justice Stevens, the author of the Court's opinion.

Justice John Paul Stevens wrote the opinion for the Court, in which he was joined by Justices David Souter, Ruth Bader Ginsburg, and Stephen Breyer, and in part by Justice Anthony Kennedy.

Stevens began with the issue of jurisdiction, denying the U.S. government's motion to dismiss under Section 1005 of the Detainee Treatment Act of 2005 (DTA), which gave the D.C. Circuit Court of Appeals "exclusive" jurisdiction to review decisions of cases being tried before military commissions. He found the government's argument to the Court unpersuasive because Congress did not include language in the DTA that might have precluded Supreme Court jurisdiction. He also rejected the government's argument that Schlesinger v. Councilman (1975) precluded Supreme Court review because Councilman applied to a member of the U.S. military who was being tried before a military court-martial, while Hamdan was not a member of the U.S. military and would be tried before a military commission rather than a court-martial. To Stevens, the more persuasive precedent was Ex parte Quirin (1942), in which the court had recognized its duty to enforce relevant Constitutional protections by convening a special Term and expediting review of a trial by military convention. He explicitly stated that, because the DTA did not bar it from considering the petition, it was unnecessary to decide whether laws unconditionally barring habeas corpus petitions would unconstitutionally violate the Suspension Clause. He also stated that Justice Antonin Scalia's dissenting argument concerning the jurisdiction-stripping statute ignored the effective date provision of that statute. He noted that language in the Congressional Record that Scalia's dissent cited had been inserted into the Record after the legislation had been enacted by Senators Lindsey Graham (R-SC) and Jon Kyl (R-AZ) and included falsified quotations attributed to other persons. He also stated that the government's contention that the war started on September 11, 2001, undercut Justice Clarence Thomas' argument that it had started in 1996.

Stevens then addressed the substantive issues of the case. He explicitly did not decide whether the president possessed the constitutional power to convene military commissions like the one created to try Hamdan. Even if the president possessed such power, Stevens argued, those tribunals would either have to be sanctioned by the "laws of war" as codified by Congress in Article 21 of the Uniform Code of Military Justice (UCMJ) or authorized by statute. As to the statutory authorization, there was nothing in the Authorization for Use of Military Force (AUMF) "even hinting" at expanding the president's war powers beyond those enumerated in Art. 21. Stevens noted that instead, the AUMF, UCMJ, and DTA "at most acknowledge" the president's authority to convene military commissions only where justified by the exigencies of war, but still operating within the laws of war.

Stevens then stated that the laws of war necessarily included the UCMJ and the Geneva Conventions, each of which requires more protections than the military commission provided. Article 36(b) of the UCMJ requires that rules applied in courts-martial and military commissions be "uniform insofar as practicable". He found several substantial deviations, including:

- The defendant and their attorney may be forbidden to view certain evidence used against the defendant
- The defendant's attorney may be forbidden to discuss certain evidence with the defendant
- Evidence judged to have any probative value may be admitted, including hearsay, unsworn live testimony, and statements gathered through torture
- Appeals are not heard by courts, but only within the executive branch (with an irrelevant exception)

These deviations made the commissions violate the UCMJ.

Stevens also found that the procedures in question violated the Common Article 3 of the Geneva Conventions, which it found "at least" applicable. He found that the D.C. Court of Appeals had erred for several reasons in concluding that the Conventions did not apply:

1. It erroneously relied on Johnson v. Eisentrager, which did not legally control in Hamdan's case because there was then no deviation between the procedures used in the tribunal and those used in courts-martial;
2. It erroneously ruled that the Geneva Conventions did not apply because Art. 3 afforded minimal protection to combatants "in the territory of" a signatory; and
3. Those minimal protections included being tried by a "regularly constituted court", which the military commission was not.

Because the military commission did not meet the requirements of the UCMJ or of the Geneva Convention, Stevens held that it violated the laws of war and therefore could not be used to try Hamdan.

The Court did not hear the question that had decided the district court opinion, namely whether Hamdan was entitled to a GCIII Art. 5 hearing instead of a Combatant Status Review Tribunal

Hamdan observes that Article 5 of the Third Geneva Convention requires that if there be "any doubt" whether he is entitled to prisoner-of-war protections, he must be afforded those protections until his status is determined by a "competent tribunal". Because we hold that Hamdan may not, in any event, be tried by the military commission the President has convened pursuant to the November 13 Order and Commission Order No. 1, the question whether his potential status as a prisoner of war independently renders illegal his trial by military commission may be reserved.

==== Plurality sections ====
Justice Anthony Kennedy did not join Stevens' opinion as to several parts, largely on the grounds that, having decided that the military commissions had no foundation, the core question of the case was decided and the Court did not need to go further. As a result, those sections were left without a majority in support.

In one of these sections, Stevens addressed the issue of whether military commissions can try conspiracy charges. He argued that military commissions are not courts of general jurisdiction, which are able to try any crime; that the court has traditionally held that offenses against the law of war are triable by military commission only when they are clearly defined as war crimes by statute or strong common law precedent (as in Quirin). Finally, he found that there was no support in statute or court precedent for law-of-war military commissions trying charges of conspiracy, either in the Geneva Conventions, the earlier Hague Conventions, or at the Nuremberg Trials.

=== Concurrences ===
==== Breyer ====
Justice Stephen Breyer wrote a one-page concurring opinion joined by Justices Anthony Kennedy, David Souter, and Ruth Bader Ginsburg. Breyer contended that the commissions were not necessarily categorically prohibited as long as Congress approved them:

Congress has denied the President the legislative authority to create military commissions of the kind at issue here. Nothing prevents the President from returning to Congress to seek the authority he believes necessary. ... Where, as here, no emergency prevents consultation with Congress, judicial insistence upon that consultation does not weaken our Nation's ability to deal with danger. To the contrary, that insistence strengthens the Nation's ability to determine—through democratic means—how best to do so. The Constitution places its faith in those democratic means. Our Court today simply does the same.

==== Kennedy ====
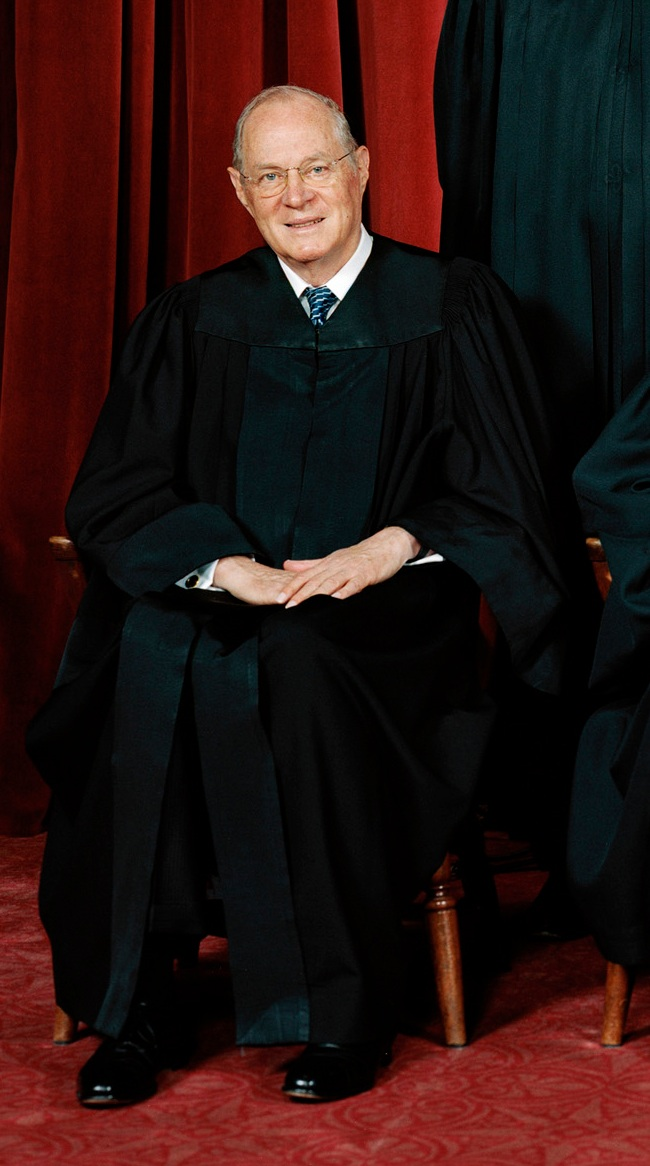
Justice Kennedy

Justice Kennedy wrote an opinion concurring in part, joined as to parts I and II by Justices Souter, Ginsburg, and Breyer.

Part I raises his concern for separation of powers; specifically, that one branch could control all the elements of a case, including avenues of review and appeal.

Part II describes the differences between the procedures of the military commissions and the procedures prescribed by the UCMJ (fewer jury members, different rules of evidence, etc.). Kennedy wrote that these differences demonstrated that the commissions did not operate under the rules of military courts-martial and raised issues of neutrality with respect to the military judges involved. He claimed that the negation of fairness safeguards rendered the commission a judicial entity which is not a "regularly constituted court", as required by the Geneva Conventions. Kennedy therefore stated that the commission exceeded congressional bounds, though Congress should be free to rewrite the law as they see fit.

Part III lists some of Kennedy's reservations. He would not say that the defendant had to be present at all stages of the trial. He also stated that there should be a reluctance to consider the applicability of Article 75 of Protocol I, since the U.S. never signed it and thus it was not binding. He wrote that he felt it was not necessary to delve into the validity of the conspiracy charge, and expressed no view on the merits of the other limitations of the commission noted in the plurality Part V of Justice Stevens' opinion.

=== Dissents ===
==== Scalia ====
Justice Antonin Scalia wrote a dissenting opinion that was joined by Justices Clarence Thomas and Samuel Alito.

Scalia called the Court's conclusion to hear the case "patently erroneous". He first relied on the part of the DTA (effective December 30, 2005) that states that "[N]o court, justice, or judge shall have jurisdiction to hear or consider an application for a writ of habeas corpus filed by or on behalf of an alien detained by the Department of Defense at Guantanamo Bay, Cuba." Scalia argued that this clause sufficed to deny the Supreme Court jurisdiction over the case, calling the majority's reading of the effectiveness provisions a "mess". He cited the 1952 Supreme Court case Bruner v. United States and other cases granting "immediate effect in pending cases, absent an explicit statutory reservation". He wrote that in interpreting the language in the DTA, the majority ignored Supreme Court precedent which established that a statute excluding jurisdiction applies to pending cases unless it has clear language saying it does not. He claimed that the majority had made this interpretation "for the flimsiest of reasons", referring to the majority's use of Senate floor debate records to bolster their interpretation. He stated that it "makes no difference" that the language in support of his position was inserted into the Congressional Record after the law was voted upon. He also accused the majority of ignoring the president's signing statement.

Scalia claimed that expanding the jurisdictions able to hear writs of habeas corpus from Guantanamo Bay would create excessive load on the court system. In addition, he stated that the original military tribunal was not shown to be inadequate. Regarding the application of the Suspension Clause of the Constitution, Scalia pointed to Johnson v. Eisentrager.

Scalia argued that petitioners such as Hamdan held outside the territorial jurisdiction of the United States lacked the right to the writ of habeas corpus. He pointed to a footnote to Hamdi v. Rumsfeld, under which he claimed Hamdan "is already subject to indefinite detention" "after an adverse determination by his CSRT [Combatant Status Review Tribunal]".

Finally, Scalia chastised the Court for taking equity jurisdiction of the case and drew an analogy with the 1975 Supreme Court case Schlesinger v. Councilman, where the Court declined to pass judgment on the decision of a military court-martial before it had finished its work; Scalia argued that likewise, the military commissions in Cuba had not yet ended their work regarding Hamdan and therefore should not be subject to judicial oversight.

==== Thomas ====
Justice Clarence Thomas read his dissent from the bench when the decision was announced, the first time he did so since his dissent in the 2000 Supreme Court case Stenberg v. Carhart.

In his dissent, Thomas asserted that the courts had no jurisdiction for the case for the reasons described in Scalia's dissent above; that Hamdan was an illegal combatant and therefore not protected by the Geneva Conventions; that the Geneva Conventions do not prohibit the special court council proposed; and that the president already had authority to set up the special court council proposed.

Citing his dissent in Hamdi v. Rumsfeld, Thomas briefly went over the roles granted by the Constitution to the three different branches in time of war. He argued that under the framework established in Ex parte Quirin and Youngstown Sheet & Tube Co. v. Sawyer, President Bush's decision to try Hamdan before a military commission was "entitled to a heavy measure of deference" inasmuch as Congress had authorized the president to use all necessary and appropriate force to prevent future acts of terrorism when it passed the Authorization for Use of Military Force of 2001.

Thomas disagreed strongly with the plurality's determination that the legality of the charges against Hamdan were doubtful because he was charged "not with an overt act for which he was caught redhanded ... but with an 'agreement' the inception of which long predated ... the [relevant armed conflict]". He lambasted the plurality for second-guessing the president's judgment, arguing that the Court's disagreement was based upon "little more than its unsupported assertions" and constituted "an unprecedented departure from the traditionally limited role of the courts with respect to war and an unwarranted intrusion on executive authority". He further disagreed with the plurality's argument that the date of the enactment of the AUMF constituted the start of war, suggesting that Osama bin Laden's declaration of jihad in August 1996 could be considered a declaration of war. Under this view, the enactment by Congress of the AUMF did not mark the beginning of the conflict with al-Qaeda but rather authorized the president to use force to combat it. Additionally, he wrote that under the common law of war, which he characterized as "flexible and evolutionary in nature", war courts are permitted a degree of latitude in their jurisdiction. In holding otherwise, he argued, the plurality had failed to properly defer to the judgment of the president and military commanders. He stated that while the Justices in the majority "disregard[ed] the commander-in-chief's wartime decisions", they had had no trouble in the then-recent case Rapanos v. United States (2006) deferring to the judgment of the Army Corps of Engineers in upholding the agency's "wildly implausible conclusion that a storm drain is a tributary of the waters of the United States". He added that "It goes without saying that there is much more at stake here than storm drains."

Thomas likewise disagreed with the plurality's holding that even if the government had charged Hamdan with a crime that was clearly cognizable by military commission, the commission would still lack power to proceed because it did not comply with the terms of the UCMJ and the Geneva Conventions. He again emphasized that the jurisdiction of military commissions was not prescribed by statute but rather "adapted in each instance to the need that called it forth". He argued that the Court's conclusion that Article 36 of the UCMJ amounted to an attempt by Congress to curb the president's power was "contrary to the text and structure of the UCMJ" and also inconsistent with prior decisions of the Court. He stated that Hamdan's claims under the Geneva Conventions were foreclosed by the Court's holding in Johnson v. Eisentrager, where the majority noted that the respondents could not assert "that anything in the Geneva Convention makes them immune from prosecution or punishment for war crimes". He wrote that, even if Hamdan's claim under Common Article 3 of the Geneva Conventions was not foreclosed by Eisentrager, it was nevertheless meritless insofar as the president had accepted the determination of the Department of Justice that Common Article 3 did not extend to al-Qaeda detainees. He asserted that the Court's duty to "defer to the President's understanding of the provision at issue" was made even more acute by the fact that in Hamdan he had been acting pursuant to his authority as Commander-in-Chief.

==== Alito ====
Justice Alito sided with Justices Thomas and Scalia's explanations of why they believed the courts had no jurisdiction to hear the case in a seven-page dissent. He wrote that the military commission in this case was legal, taking issue with the holding of the Court that military commissions did not meet the definition of "a regularly constituted court" as required in Common Article 3 of the Geneva Conventions. He argued that Common Article 3 was satisfied in Hamdan because the military commissions:

1. qualified as courts;
2. were appointed and established in accordance with domestic law; and
3. any procedural improprieties that might occur in particular cases could be reviewed in those cases.

Alito specifically disagreed with the opinions stating that the military commission before which Hamdan would be tried was not "a regularly constituted court" and was "illegal" because the commission's procedures allegedly would not comply with 10 U.S.C. § 836. He argued that the military commission was "regularly" or "properly" constituted, using the example of the various types of local, state, federal and international courts and stating that "although these courts are 'differently constituted' and differ substantially in many other respects, they are all 'regularly constituted.'"

Alito stated that Common Article 3 did not specifically rule out military commissions, and further pointed to the commentary in Article 66, which was the article the Court used in support of its opinion. Alito argued that even if Common Article 3 recognized a prohibition on "special tribunals", which Article 66 does prohibit, such a prohibition was not applicable to Hamdan's tribunal because the military commissions were "regular". Further, Alito concluded that, because the Bush administration might conduct hundreds of such tribunals according to the same procedures, "it seems that petitioner's tribunal, like the hundreds of others respondents propose to conduct, is very much regular and not at all special."

Alito wrote that "the commissions were appointed, set up, and established pursuant to an order of the President, just like the commission in Ex parte Quirin, 317 U. S. 1 (1942), and the Court acknowledges that Quirin recognized that the statutory predecessor of 10 U.S.C. § 821 'preserved' the President's power 'to convene military commissions.'" Alito disagreed with Justice Kennedy's assertion that "an acceptable degree of independence from the Executive is necessary to render a commission 'regularly constituted' by the standards of our Nation's system of justice", arguing that Kennedy "offers no support for this proposition (which in any event seems to be more about fairness or integrity than regularity)", and further arguing that the commission in Quirin was no different from the present case.

Finally, Alito wrote that the commission procedures as a whole do not provide a basis for deeming the commissions to be illegitimate. He pointed to two procedural rules with which the Court found fault: first, the rule "allowing the Secretary of Defense to change the governing rules 'from time to time'"; and second, the rule that "permits the admission of any evidence that would have 'probative value to a reasonable person'". He asserted that these rules could not make the commissions illegitimate. Regarding the first rule, he argued that not all changes during the course of a trial prejudice the defendant, and some may even help the defendant. In addition, he stated that "if a change is made and applied during the course of an ongoing proceeding and if the accused is found guilty, the validity of that procedure can be considered in the review proceeding for that case." Regarding the second rule, he argued that it did not violate the international standard incorporated into Common Article 3 because "rules of evidence differ from country to country" and "much of the world does not follow aspects of our evidence rules, such as the general prohibition against the admission of hearsay".

== Reaction to the decision ==
The impact of the decision on the petitioner, Salim Hamdan, was that he could still be tried; however, his trial would have to be in a court, such as a military court-martial or commission with court-like protections.

President George W. Bush expressed an intention to acquire explicit Congressional authorization to use military tribunals. Press Secretary Tony Snow echoed the plan in an appeal to Congress. However, even among Senate Republicans, there were conflicting views. Senators Arlen Specter and Lindsey Graham (the latter a former Judge Advocate General) indicated that Congress would work quickly to authorize tribunals, while the influential Senator John Warner suggested a cautious and deliberative response. The Military Commissions Act of 2006, whose stated purpose was "to authorize trial by military commission for violations of the law of war, and for other purposes", passed shortly thereafter. The act raised again the issue of which court would hear cases such as Hamdan's, as the Department of Justice as a result filed notice with several federal judges and gave notice to hundreds of detainees that the habeas corpus petitions of alien unlawful enemy combatants , or those whose status was to be determined, were not within the jurisdiction of those courts.

On July 7, 2006, the Department of Defense issued a memo titled "Application of Common Article 3 of the Geneva Conventions to the Treatment of Detainees in the Department of Defense". This was followed by a July 11, 2006 statement by the Bush administration that all detainees at the Guantanamo Bay detention camp and in U.S. military custody everywhere were entitled to humane treatment under the Geneva Conventions. This declaration did not cover CIA detainees and was ambiguous with respect to the interpretation of Common Article 3 and the definition of "humane treatment".

There were some indications that the other detainees being held at facilities throughout the world (e.g., Bagram Air Base and black sites), might use the Supreme Court's ruling in Hamdan to challenge their treatment on the grounds that since the Geneva Conventions afforded protection to Hamdan, its other protections might be effective for them as well. Commentators expressed mixed opinions about the strength of this argument.

=== Implications for theories of executive power ===
As of 2006, the decision may have important implications for other disputes relating to the extent of executive power and the unitary executive theory. In particular, it may undermine the Bush administration's legal arguments for domestic wiretapping by the National Security Agency without warrants as required by the Foreign Intelligence Surveillance Act.

=== Charges dismissed/new charges ===
On June 5, 2007, Hamdan and Canadian youth Omar Khadr had all charges against them dismissed. The judges presiding over their military commissions ruled that the Military Commissions Act did not give them the jurisdiction to try Hamdan and Khadr because it only authorized the trial of "unlawful enemy combatants". Hamdan and Khadr's Combatant Status Review Tribunals, like those of all the other Guantanamo captives, had only termed them "enemy combatants".

In December 2007, a tribunal determined that Hamdan was an "unlawful enemy combatant". In August 2008, he was convicted by the military commission of the lesser of two charges and received a sentence of 66 months, reduced by time served to five and a half months. In November 2008, the US transferred him to Yemen, where he served his last month. After release, he joined his family in Sanaa, Yemen. In October 2012, the District of Columbia Court of Appeals overturned Hamdan's conviction, acquitting him of the charge.

== See also ==
- List of United States Supreme Court cases, volume 548
- List of United States Supreme Court cases
- Rasul v. Bush
- Boumediene v. Bush
