= 2025 United States federal government grant pause =

2025 pause in United States federal grants and loans

On January 27, 2025, the Office of Management and Budget (OMB), an office of the Executive Office of the President of the United States, ordered a pause to the disbursement of federal grants and loans, to take effect the following day. Acting director Matthew Vaeth characterized the order as necessary to prevent funding for diversity, equity, and inclusion (DEI) programs and woke ideals. Although the exact extent was initially unclear, the memo exempted federal assistance to individuals from the pause, including programs such as Social Security and Medicare. Despite this, reimbursements for programs such as Medicaid and Head Start were inaccessible to many on January 28. The OMB released a second memo clarifying the order, saying that it was necessary to implement President Donald Trump's recent executive orders.

The pause in funding for "open awards" was stayed on January 28 by district judge Loren AliKhan, minutes before the deadline for the pause. On January 29, the OMB retracted the initial memo, but White House press secretary Karoline Leavitt said that efforts to freeze federal funding would continue. On January 31, district judge John J. McConnell Jr. issued a temporary restraining order mandating that federal agencies cannot impede or cancel "any awards or obligations" on the basis of the OMB memo or Trump's recent executive orders. AliKhan and McConnell issued preliminary injunctions against the Trump administration in February 2025 and March 2025 respectively. Also in February 2025, McConnell cited evidence that the Trump administration "continued to improperly freeze federal funds and refused to resume disbursement of appropriated federal funds".

By August 2025, several grant terminations and spending freezes were found by judges and the Government Accountability Office as being illegal and unconstitutional.

== Trump administration actions ==
=== Release of memo and spreadsheet ===
On January 27, 2025, memo M-25-13 was released by Matthew Vaeth, acting director for the Office of Management and Budget (OMB). The memo said that the federal government of the United States in fiscal year 2024 spent over $3 trillion in federal "financial assistance, such as grants and loans", criticized the usage of "resources to advance Marxist equity, transgenderism, and [Green New Deal] social engineering policies", and then instructed "federal agencies to identify and review all federal financial assistance programs and supporting activities consistent with [President Trump's] policies and requirement".

Simultaneously, the memo instructed that federal agencies "must temporarily pause all activities related to obligation or disbursement of all federal financial assistance, and other relevant agency activities that may be implicated by [Trump's] executive orders, including, but not limited to, financial assistance for foreign aid, nongovernmental organizations, DEI, woke gender ideology, and the Green New Deal." The pause was to start at 5 p.m. EST on January 28, 2025. The memo continued that the pause would allow the Trump administration to "determine the best uses of the funding for those programs consistent with the law and [Trump's] priorities", while "Medicare or Social Security benefits" and "assistance provided directly to individuals" were exempted from being paused.

Along with the memo, OMB published a spreadsheet of around 2,600 federal programs for review, including Medicare, Social Security benefits, Medicaid, rental assistance, Pell grants, Head Start, and the Supplemental Nutrition Assistance Program.

=== Question-and-answer sheet ===
On the afternoon of January 28, the OMB released a question-and-answer sheet declaring several schemes (Medicaid, SNAP, "funds for small businesses, farmers, Pell grants, Head Start, rental assistance", student loans, "any program that provides direct benefits to Americans", and any "program not implicated by the President's Executive Orders") exempt from the federal funding freeze. The executive orders by Trump that were highlighted are Protecting The American People Against Invasion, Reevaluating and Realigning United States Foreign Aid, Putting America First in International Environmental Agreements, Unleashing American Energy, Ending Radical and Wasteful Government DEI Programs and Preferencing, Defending Women from Gender Ideology Extremism and Restoring Biological Truth to the Federal Government, and Enforcing the Hyde Amendment.

=== Withdrawal of memo; continuation of pause ===
On January 29, the OMB withdrew the memo, with the White House Press Secretary, Karoline Leavitt, commenting:

This is NOT a rescission of the federal funding freeze. It is simply a rescission of the OMB memo. Why? To end any confusion created by the court's injunction. The President's EO's on federal funding remain in full force and effect, and will be rigorously implemented.

— @PressSec on x.com (January 29, 2025)

On February 7, the Rhode Island Office of Energy Resources reported that it could not utilize federal funding assigned to it by the Environmental Protection Agency; also by that day, the International Training and Education Center for Health of the University of Washington reported having no access to funds for ongoing projects, including on those combating the spread of HIV.

On February 10, Stacey Street, the director of the Federal Emergency Management Agency's Office of Grant Administration, instructed her colleagues to "put financial holds on all of your awards—all open awards, all years (2021, 2022, 2023, 2024)", despite two court orders barring such freezes.

On February 19, The New York Times reported that the Trump administration had found loopholes to defy the spirit of the court orders to continue funding freezes by citing other legal authorities.

== Initial aftermath ==
The exact extent of the order, and for which programs funding was paused, was initially unclear. White House press secretary Karoline Leavitt defended the freeze order, saying it was necessary to prevent public funding of "transgenderism and wokeness", but she was initially unable to confirm whether programs such as Medicaid and Meals on Wheels would be affected by the pause in funding. In a second memo released on January 28, the OMB clarified the order, saying that it was necessary in order to follow the recent series of executive orders issued by President Donald Trump, of which many aimed to curtail funding for federal foreign aid and DEI programs.

Despite federal statements that the program would be unaffected, Senator Ron Wyden reported that a web portal used to access Medicaid funding was inaccessible for doctors in all states. Preschools noted that they could not receive reimbursements through the Head Start program. A memo obtained by the news agency Reuters reported that the Department of Justice was preparing to freeze $4 billion of funding following the order.

Several Democratic officials, including Senator Patty Murray, called the funding pause illegal and unconstitutional. Senate Democratic leader Chuck Schumer called it "lawless, destructive, cruel". Legal opponents cited the Impoundment Control Act of 1974, which bars the president from withholding funding for political purposes, subject to review by the Government Accountability Office. Trump and OMB director nominee Russell Vought have advocated impoundment and called the 1974 act unconstitutional. Republican leaders defended the funding pause as an appropriate use of executive power; House Speaker Mike Johnson called it "an application of common sense". Republican Senator Kevin Cramer said on January 28 that he supported the pause, adding that Trump was testing his own authority and "getting some guidance that presidents have more authority than they'd traditionally used".

== Legal challenges ==
=== Lawsuit in the District of Columbia ===
Following a lawsuit facilitated by legal group Democracy Forward on behalf of plaintiffs SAGE, the National Council of Nonprofits, the American Public Health Association and the Main Street Alliance, Judge Loren AliKhan of the United States District Court for the District of Columbia on January 28 implemented a "brief administrative stay" temporarily blocking the pause in funding for "open awards" until a hearing set for February 3. The stay went into effect just minutes before the funding pause was scheduled to begin.

Judge AliKhan on February 3 placed a temporary restraining order on the Trump administration to block the pause in funding under "all open awards", ordering that any funding under open awards was to be disbursed; later on February 25, AliKhan implemented a preliminary injunction on the Trump administration for the same matter.

On February 3, AliKhan rejected the Trump administration's argument that a block would be moot due to the OMB memo's recission. AliKhan characterized the Trump administration's argument as very "disingenuous", citing evidence that the funding freeze was still ongoing, with AliKhan commenting that "it appears that OMB sought to overcome a judicially imposed obstacle without actually ceasing the challenged conduct ... Destroying the paper trail of allegedly illegal activity means nothing if the activity persists".

In ruling against the Trump administration on February 3, Judge AliKhan cited evidence that there was "nationwide panic in the wake of the funding freeze ... Organizations with every conceivable mission – healthcare, scientific research, emergency shelters, and more – were shut out of funding portals or denied critical resources beginning on January 28 [...] Americans are being denied access to programs that heal them, house them, and feed them". Ultimately, the Trump administration was "interfering with Congress's appropriation of federal funds" and "offered no rational explanation" for freezing federal funding within a day, wrote AliKhan.

Judge AliKhan's February 25 ruling cited "significant evidence indicating that the funding freeze would be economically catastrophic — and in some circumstances, fatal" to nonprofits and small businesses. AliKhan stated that the Trump administration "either wanted to pause up to $3 trillion in federal spending practically overnight, or they expected each federal agency to review every single one of its grants, loans, and funds for compliance in less than twenty-four hours", but AliKhan found "no clear statutory hook for this broad assertion of power" by the Trump administration.

=== Lawsuit in Rhode Island ===
After the attorneys general of 22 states (Arizona, California, Colorado, Connecticut, Delaware, Hawaii, Illinois, Maine, Maryland, Massachusetts, Michigan, Minnesota, Nevada, North Carolina, New Jersey, New Mexico, New York, Oregon, Rhode Island, Vermont, Washington, and Wisconsin) and the District of Columbia sued, Judge John J. McConnell Jr. of the United States District Court for the District of Rhode Island ruled in their favor on January 31, 2025, by issuing a temporary restraining order that mandated that federal agencies cannot pause, impede, or cancel "any awards or obligations on the basis of the OMB Memo, or on the basis of the President's recently issued Executive Orders".

McConnell called the OMB memo "wide-ranging, all-encompassing, and ambiguous", adding that it "cites no legal authority" and in any case, "no federal law would authorize the Executive's unilateral action here", which contravenes "the separation of powers". Rejecting the Trump administration's argument as "constitutionally flawed", McConnell explained: "The executive branch has a duty to align federal spending and action with the will of the people as expressed through congressional appropriations, not through 'presidential priorities'" as claimed by the Trump administration.

Furthermore, the Trump administration had argued that the retraction of the OMB memo rendered the case moot, but McConnell rejected this, citing a tweet by Press Secretary Leavitt denying "rescission of the federal funding freeze". McConnell wrote: "The evidence shows that the alleged rescission of the OMB directive was in name-only and may have been issued simply to defeat the jurisdiction of the courts. The substantive effect of the directive carries on", warranting judicial action.

On February 10, McConnell cited the suing states as providing "evidence" that the Trump administration "in some cases have continued to improperly freeze federal funds and refused to resume disbursement of appropriated federal funds", causing "irreparable harm to a vast portion of this country". McConnell rejected the Trump administration's justification of "trying to root out fraud", finding that "the freezes in effect now were a result of the broad categorical order, not a specific finding of possible fraud"; hence McConnell ordered the Trump administration to "immediately restore frozen funding".

Trump filed an emergency appeal of the January 31 ruling, but on February 11, the 1st U.S. Circuit Court of Appeals rejected it in favor of continued action by the district court. The appeals court judges said that the Trump administration did "not cite any authority in support of their administrative stay request or identify any harm related to a specific funding action or actions that they will face without their requested administrative stay".

On March 6, Judge McConnell implemented a preliminary injunction against the funding freeze; he wrote that the Trump administration "put itself above Congress", as the funding freeze "imposed a categorical mandate on the spending of congressionally appropriated and obligated funds without regard to Congress's authority to control spending." McConnell highlighted the impact of the funding freeze, writing that when funding is "not paid as promised, harm follows — debt is incurred, debt is unpaid, essential health and safety services stop, and budgets are upended", with "education, childcare, and transportation infrastructure" also being affected. McConnell rejected the Trump administration's argument that ruling for the states unfairly impacted the Trump administration, as he wrote: "An agency is not harmed by an order prohibiting it from violating the law".
