= Cox Broadcasting Corp. v. Cohn =

- Supreme Court of the United States

Argued November 11, 1974 Decided March 3, 1975
- Full case name: Cox Broadcasting Corp. v. Cohn
- Docket no.: 73-938
- Citations: 420 U.S. 469 (more) 95 S. Ct. 1029; 43 L. Ed. 2d 328; 1975 U.S. LEXIS 139

Case history
- Prior: 231 Ga. 60; 200 S.E.2d 127 (1973)

Holding
- The identity of a rape victim, if obtained by proper means, and the commission of a crime and facts surrounding the prosecution of that crime are matters of public concern and are protected by the First Amendment freedom of the press.

Court membership
- Chief Justice Warren E. Burger Associate Justices William O. Douglas · William J. Brennan Jr. Potter Stewart · Byron White; Thurgood Marshall · Harry Blackmun; Lewis F. Powell Jr. · William Rehnquist

Case opinions
- Majority: White, joined by Brennan, Stewart, Marshall, Blackmun, Powell
- Concurrence: Burger (in the judgment)
- Concurrence: Douglas (in the judgment)
- Concurrence: Powell
- Dissent: Rehnquist

Laws applied
- U.S. Const. amend. I

Cox Broadcasting Corp. v. Cohn, 420 U.S. 469 (1975), was a United States Supreme Court case involving freedom of the press publishing public information. The Court held that both a Georgia statute prohibiting the release of a rape victim's name and its common-law privacy action counterpart were unconstitutional. The case was argued on November 11, 1974, and decided on March 3, 1975.

== Background ==
On August 18, 1971, a 17-year-old North Springs High School student was sexually assaulted at a party and later died in Sandy Springs, Georgia. Law enforcement officials initially believed her death was the result of alcohol poisoning or drug overdose. Upon finding vegetation in her clothing, the police began treating the case as a murder and rape case, and it was later revealed that she asphyxiated on her own vomit. Seven months later, six boys were charged with her rape and murder, although the trial judge later dropped the murder charge. Ultimately, five of the six defendants—Ronald Eugene Longo, Joe Adams Thompson, Bruce Fuson Howard, Peter Manchee, Bobby Ray King, and Craig Michael Wozniak—pleaded guilty to rape and attempt to rape while one pleaded not guilty. Due to the graphic nature of the crime, the media immediately jumped on the story and began following the proceedings. Thomas Wassell, a reporter for WSB-TV, approached the clerk in open court during a recess in the court proceedings in 1972 and asked for a copy of the indictment documents, which contained the name of the victim. He obtained the name and broadcast it later that night while reporting on the defendant's sentencing hearing.

=== Procedural history ===
Martin Cohn, the father of the victim, sued both WSB and its reporter for publishing his daughter's name. He claimed the publication violated both Georgia's shield law and his common-law right to privacy. The trial court granted summary judgement to Cohn on both claims while rejecting Cox's 1st Amendment defense.

On appeal, the Georgia Supreme Court dismissed Cohn's claim under the Shield Law, claiming it created only a criminal, not civil cause of action. However, it allowed Cohn's common-law privacy claim to stand. It rejected Cox's claims that the disclosure of the rape victim's name was protected by the First Amendment, and compared the activity to other unprotected activities such as fraud, perjury, libel, and slander. Upon rehearing, it also ruled that the Shield Law, and by implicit extension its interpretation of common-law right to privacy, was a "legitimate limitation on the right of freedom of expression contained in the First Amendment[]" and "[t]here simply is no public interest or general concern about the identity of the victim of such a crime as will make the right to disclose the identity of the victim rise to the level of First Amendment protection." It reversed the trial court's summary judgment on the right to privacy claim, and remanded the case back to the trial court to determine if Cox had intentionally invaded Cohn's privacy. Cox Broadcasting Corp. v. Cohn, 200 SE 2d 127 - Georgia Supreme Court 1973.

Before the case could proceed at the State trial court, the United States Supreme Court agreed to hear Cox's appeal. The Court reasoned it had jurisdiction since Georgia's Supreme Court's ruling satisfied the finality requirement as it related to Federal issues. Also, if unreviewed, the decision was likely to harm the freedom of the press regardless of the outcome of the state court trial.

== Opinion of the Court ==
The Supreme Court ruled 8−1 in favor of Cox Broadcasting, holding Georgia's Shield Law and its common-law counterpart violated the First Amendment. The majority held "[t]he freedom of the press to publish that information appears to us to be of critical importance to our type of government in which the citizenry is the final judge of the proper conduct of public business. In preserving that form of government the First and Fourteenth Amendments command nothing less than that the States may not impose sanctions on the publication of truthful information contained in official court records open to public inspection." Since Cox's reporter had legitimately obtained the name in a public document in open court, the court held that later publication of the name was an activity protected by the 1st Amendment.

=== Dissent ===
In his dissent, Justice Rehnquist argued the Court should not have heard the case because it lacked jurisdiction. Instead of waiting until the case finished in state court, "the Court construes § 1257 so that it may virtually rush out and meet the prospective constitutional litigant as he approaches our doors." He did not address the substantive First Amendment issues.

== See also ==
- List of United States Supreme Court cases, volume 420
- List of United States Supreme Court cases by the Burger Court
- List of United States Supreme Court cases involving the First Amendment
