= Impoundment of appropriated funds =

Budget control method

Impoundment is an act by a president of the United States of not spending money that has been appropriated by the U.S. Congress. Thomas Jefferson was the first president to exercise the power of impoundment in 1801 with Congressional approval. The power was available to all presidents up to and including Richard Nixon, and was regarded as a power inherent to the office, although one with limits. The Congressional Budget and Impoundment Control Act of 1974 was enacted in response to high impoundments under President Nixon. The Act removed that power, and Train v. City of New York (whose facts predate the 1974 Act, but which was argued before the U.S. Supreme Court after its enactment) closed a potential loophole in the 1974 Act. The president's ability to indefinitely reject congressionally approved spending was thus removed.

The Impoundment Control Act of 1974 provides that the president may propose rescission of specific funds, but that rescission must be approved by both the House of Representatives and Senate within 45 days. In effect, the requirement removed the impoundment power, since Congress is not required to vote on the rescission and, in fact, has ignored the vast majority of presidential requests.

The mayor of Washington, D.C. also has impoundment power.

== History ==
Impoundment is, more generally, the act of detaining something such as animals or personal property due to a legal dispute. In roughly this sense, the President detains funds in the treasury rather than spending them as appropriated. The first use of the power by President Thomas Jefferson involved refusal to spend $50,000 ($1.27 million in 2024) in funds appropriated for the acquisition of gunboats for the United States Navy. He said in 1803 that "[t]he sum of fifty thousand dollars appropriated by Congress for providing gun boats remains unexpended. The favorable and peaceable turn of affairs on the Mississippi rendered an immediate execution of that law unnecessary." In keeping with his efforts to reduce the size of the debt, he left the funds for the ships unspent for over a year.

Many other presidents have followed Jefferson's example. From time to time, they refused to spend funds when they felt that Congress had appropriated more funds than was necessary. However, the impoundment power had limits. For example, in 1972, Richard Nixon attempted to impound funds on an environmental project which he opposed. Congress had previously overridden Nixon's veto of the project. The Supreme Court in Train v. City of New York (1975) ruled that the impoundment power cannot be used to frustrate the will of Congress under such circumstances.

The Impoundment Control Act of 1974 was passed as Congress felt that President Nixon was abusing his authority to impound the funding of programs he opposed. The Act effectively removed the impoundment power of the president and required him to obtain Congressional approval if he wants to rescind specific government spending. President Nixon signed the Act with little protest because the administration was then embroiled in the Watergate scandal and unwilling to provoke Congress.

The Line Item Veto Act of 1996 gave the president the power of line-item veto, which President Bill Clinton applied to the federal budget 82 times before the law was struck down in 1998 by the Supreme Court on the grounds of it being in violation of the Presentment Clause of the United States Constitution.

Donald Trump and appointees to his second administration argued the Impoundment Control Act is unconstitutional, though few legal scholars agree. Trump's assertion of this power resulted in the 2025 United States federal government grant pause, which was put on hold by a preliminary court injunction before it took effect.

== See also ==
- Antideficiency Act
- Department of State v. AIDS Vaccine Advocacy Coalition
- Loss of supply
- Rescission bill
- Unitary executive theory
