= Lefkowitz v. Newsome =

- Supreme Court of the United States

Argued December 11, 1974 Decided February 19, 1975
- Full case name: Louis J. Lefkowitz, Attorney General of New York v. Leon Newsome
- Citations: 420 U.S. 283 (more) 95 S. Ct. 886; 43 L. Ed. 2d 418; 43 L. Ed. 2d 196

Case history
- Prior: United States ex rel. Newsome v. Malcolm, 492 F.2d 1166 (2d Cir. 1974); cert. granted, 417 U.S. 967 (1974).

Holding
- When state law permits a defendant to plead guilty without forfeiting his right to judicial review of specified constitutional issues, the defendant is not foreclosed from pursuing those constitutional claims in a federal habeas corpus proceeding. The judgment of the Court of Appeals for the Second Circuit is affirmed.

Court membership
- Chief Justice Warren E. Burger Associate Justices William O. Douglas · William J. Brennan Jr. Potter Stewart · Byron White; Thurgood Marshall · Harry Blackmun; Lewis F. Powell Jr. · William Rehnquist

Case opinions
- Majority: Stewart, joined by Douglas, Brennan, Marshall, Blackmun
- Dissent: White, joined by Burger, Rehnquist
- Dissent: Powell, joined by Burger, Rehnquist

Laws applied
- Criminal Procedure, Habeas Corpus

Lefkowitz v. Newsome, 420 U.S. 283 (1975), is a U.S. Supreme Court case which held that when state law permits a defendant to plead guilty without giving up his right to judicial review of specified constitutional issues, such as the lawfulness of a search or the voluntariness of a confession, the defendant is not prevented from pursuing those constitutional claims in a federal habeas corpus proceeding.

== Legal background ==
Most states require that a defendant must plead not guilty and go to trial to maintain the right to have state appellate review of constitutional challenges he might make to arrest, admissibility of evidence, or the voluntariness of a confession. New York is unique in allowing a defendant to plead guilty while still maintaining these rights.

== Facts of the case ==
Leon Newsome was arrested on the charge of loitering in the lobby of a New York City Housing Authority apartment building. Upon search, a small quantity of heroin and narcotics paraphernalia was found on his person. Thus he was charged with possession of a dangerous drug and drug paraphernalia, in addition to loitering. Newsome pleaded not guilty on all charges, claimed the loitering law was unconstitutional, and made a motion to suppress the evidence leading to the drug charges. Upon a non-jury trial by New York City Criminal Court, Newsome was convicted of loitering. In a hearing, the same court rejected the motion to suppress evidence related to the drug charges. One month later, Newsome withdrew his not guilty pleas, pleading guilty to a lesser charge of attempted possession of dangerous drugs. At the sentencing proceeding, Newsome announced that he would appeal both the loitering conviction and the denial of his motion to suppress the evidence related to the drug charges.

== Appeals ==
The loitering charge was reversed upon appeal for lack of evidence by Appellate Division of the New York Supreme Court, but the drug convictions were upheld on the grounds that there was probable cause for the original arrest and search. Newsome petitioned for review of the drug conviction to the New York Court of Appeals, but this was denied. The Court also denied a petition for a writ of certiorari.

Newsome subsequently filed a writ of habeas corpus in the United States District Court for the Eastern District of New York. The petition repeated the claim that because the loitering statute was unconstitutional, Newsome's arrest was therefore invalid, and that as a result, the evidence seized relating to that arrest should be suppressed. Meanwhile, the New York Court of Appeals declared New York's loitering statute unconstitutional before the District Court could render a decision on the merits of Newsome's petition; considering this, the District Court granted Newsome's application for a writ of habeas corpus.

The District Court decided that because Newsome was searched on suspicion for probable cause during an arrest for the violation of a statute subsequently found to be unconstitutional, Newsome's search was unconstitutional and the evidence should be suppressed. The District Court granted the writ of habeas corpus.

The Attorney General of New York sought review of both decisions: the decision that Newsome had not waived his right to file a federal habeas corpus petition by pleading guilty and also the decision that New York's loitering statute was unconstitutional. Since there was a conflict between Newsome's case and a previous decision of the United States Court of Appeals for the Ninth Circuit, the US Supreme Court granted certiorari restricted to the question of Newsome's right to file a federal habeas corpus petition challenging the issues in his case; that is, was the search lawful and was the confession voluntary, when a state provides for appellate review of those issues after a guilty plea?

== Decision ==
The Supreme Court held the following:

... when state law permits a defendant to plead guilty without forfeiting his right to judicial review of specified constitutional issues, the defendant is not foreclosed from pursuing those constitutional claims in a federal habeas corpus proceeding. The judgment of the Court of Appeals for the Second Circuit is affirmed.

== See also ==
- List of United States Supreme Court cases, volume 420
