= United States v. Feola =

- Supreme Court of the United States

Argued November 19, 1974 Decided March 19, 1975
- Full case name: United States v. Feola
- Citations: 420 U.S. 671 (more) 95 S. Ct. 1255; 43 L. Ed. 2d 541; 1975 U.S. LEXIS 4

Case history
- Prior: United States v. Alsondo, 486 F.2d 1339 (2d Cir. 1973); cert. granted, 416 U.S. 935 (1974).

Holding
- Conspiracy to commit an assault on a federal agent carries no greater mens rea element than the substantive crime

Court membership
- Chief Justice Warren E. Burger Associate Justices William O. Douglas · William J. Brennan Jr. Potter Stewart · Byron White; Thurgood Marshall · Harry Blackmun; Lewis F. Powell Jr. · William Rehnquist

Case opinions
- Majority: Blackmun, joined by Burger, Brennan, White, Marshall, Powell, Rehnquist
- Dissent: Stewart, joined by Douglas

Laws applied
- 18 U.S.C. § 111; 18 U.S.C. § 371

United States v. Feola, 420 U.S. 671 (1975), is a United States Supreme Court case in which the court held that conspiracy to assault a federal officer, like the substantive crime of assaulting a federal officer, doesn't require knowledge that the victims were federal officers.

The case involved a drug "rip-off" in which the defendant and his co-conspirators agreed to sell sugar as heroin to unsuspecting buyers. They agreed that if the buyers discovered their ruse, they would jump the buyers and take their money. The sellers didn't know that the buyers were all undercover federal narcotics agents. Although the sellers tried to assault one of the agents, another agent pulled out his revolver and the agents eventually arrested the sellers.

The court's opinion addressed—and eventually dispensed with—Judge Learned Hand's famous analogy in United States v. Crimmins 123 F.2d 271, 273 (2d Cir. 1941). Hand noted that conspiracy to commit mail fraud was akin to conspiracy to run a red light - both substantive crimes don't require knowledge beforehand. But agreement or conspiracy requires knowledge that there is such a red light, or that the mails will be used. The Court characterized this analogy as "effective prose...[but]...bad law." 420, at 689-90. The court argued that conspiracy agreements don't require agreement on every point of the crime, and so imposing a higher agreement requirement for a conspiracy to assault was illogical in light of the policy reasons for criminalizing conspiracy. The court identified these reasons as protecting society from concerted criminal activity and the social threat posed even by an inchoate crime.

Instead the court reasoned that because the conspiracy statute didn't require a higher mens rea than the substantive crime, the same mens rea requirement applies to both by default. The court reasoned that one purpose of the assault statute was to provide a federal forum (specific jurisdiction) for assaults on federal officers. Therefore, conspiracy to assault a federal officer didn't require proof that the defendant knew that his intended victim was a federal officer.

Justice Potter Stewart dissented, arguing that the structure of the assault statute and legislative history of its predecessor supported his interpretation that the statute only applied if the defendant knew his victim was a federal officer.

== Sources ==
- Stephen A. Saltzburg, et al. Criminal Law-Cases and Materials (2008, Third Ed.) Newark, NJ: LexisNexis. pp 752–53.
