= Train v. City of New York =

- Supreme Court of the United States

Argued November 12, 1974 Decided February 18, 1975
- Full case name: Train v. City of New York
- Citations: 420 U.S. 35 (more) 95 S. Ct. 839; 43 L. Ed. 2d 1; 1975 U.S. LEXIS 104

Case history
- Prior: City of New York v. Train, 494 F.2d 1033 (D.C. Cir. 1974); cert. granted, 416 U.S. 969 (1974).

Holding
- "The 1972 Amendments do not permit the Administrator to allot to the States under § 205(a) less than the entire amounts authorized to be appropriated by § 207. pp. 420 U. S. 42–49."

Court membership
- Chief Justice Warren E. Burger Associate Justices William O. Douglas · William J. Brennan Jr. Potter Stewart · Byron White; Thurgood Marshall · Harry Blackmun; Lewis F. Powell Jr. · William Rehnquist

Case opinions
- Majority: White, joined by Burger, Brennan, Stewart, Marshall, Blackmun, Powell, Rehnquist
- Concurrence: Douglas

Laws applied
- Federal Water Pollution Control Act Amendments of 1972 to the Clean Water Act, 86 Stat. 816, 33 U.S.C. § 1251 et seq. (1970 ed., Supp III) (1972 Act)

Train v. City of New York, 420 U.S. 35 (1975), is a decision of the Supreme Court of the United States addressing presidential impoundment of appropriated funds. The Court held that the President could not withhold funds that Congress directed the United States Environmental Protection Agency (EPA) to allot, basing its decision on statutory interpretation rather than resolving the constitutionality of presidential impoundment authority.

== Facts ==
In this case, President Richard Nixon was of the view that the administration was not obligated to disburse all funds allocated by Congress to states seeking federal monetary assistance under the Federal Water Pollution Control Act Amendments of 1972 (popularly known as the Clean Water Act) and ordered the impoundment of substantial amounts of environmental protection funds for a program. He had vetoed the program, but Congress had overridden the veto.

EPA administrator Russell E. Train complied with the President's order to impound funds. Several prospective recipients of the funds (which were intended to subsidize construction of municipal sewers and water treatment works), including the city of New York and several other municipalities, promptly sued, seeking judgment that the administrator was obligated to disburse full amounts authorized and an order directing him to make those allotments.

== Decision ==
In interpreting the statute and its key terms "sums" (not all sums) and "not to exceed," the Court declined to interpret the statute as a congressional grant of discretion to the President to order the withholding of substantial amounts (impoundment of appropriated funds) of environmental protection funds for a program in these circumstances. The Court's review of the statute's legislative history revealed no intention to grant impoundment authority.

== Impact ==
The case arose from facts which pre-date the Congressional Budget and Impoundment Control Act of 1974, though the case was argued after the passing of the 1974 Act. The case showed that the presidential power of impoundment, even without the 1974 Act, was limited by a fair reading of the words Congress chose in its appropriation act. The President is required to carry out the full objectives or scope of programs for which budget authority is provided by the United States Congress. In this case, the President could not order the impoundment of substantial amounts of environmental protection funds for a program he had unsuccessfully vetoed. This finding closed a potential loophole in the Act.

== See also ==
- List of United States Supreme Court cases, volume 420
