= 2007 United States federal budget =

2007 Budget of the United States federal government
- Submitted: February 6, 2006
- Submitted by: George W. Bush
- Submitted to: 109th Congress
- Country: United States
- Total revenue: $2.416 trillion (requested) $2.568 trillion (actual); 17.9% of GDP (actual)
- Total expenditures: $2.77 trillion (requested) $2.729 trillion (actual); 19.1% of GDP (actual)
- Deficit: $354 billion (requested) $160.7 billion (actual); 1.1% of GDP (actual)
- Debt: $8.95 trillion (at fiscal end); 62.5% of GDP (actual)
- GDP: $14.323 trillion
- Website: Government Publishing Office

The budget of the United States government for fiscal year 2007 was produced through a budget process involving both the legislative and executive branches of the federal government. While the Congress has the constitutional "power of the purse", the President and his appointees play a major role in budget deliberations. Since 1976, the federal fiscal year has started on October 1 of each year.

The government was initially funded through a series of three temporary continuing resolutions. Final funding for the Department of Defense was enacted on September 29, 2006 as part of the Department of Defense Appropriations Act, 2007, while the Department of Homeland Security was funded through the Department of Homeland Security Appropriations Act, 2007, enacted on October 4, 2006. The remaining departments and agencies were funded as part of a full-year continuing resolution, the Revised Continuing Appropriations Resolution, 2007, on February 15, 2007.

== Total receipts ==
2007 Actual Receipts by Source
1. Individual income tax (45.3%)
2. Social Security/other payroll tax (33.9%)
3. Corporate income tax (14.4%)
4. Excise tax (2.50%)
5. Estate and gift taxes (1.00%)
6. Customs duties (1.00%)
7. Other miscellaneous receipts (1.90%)

Receipts by source: (in billions of dollars)

Source	Requested	Actual
Individual income tax	1,096	1,163
Corporate income tax	261	370
Social Security and other payroll tax	884	870
Excise tax	75	65
Estate and gift taxes	24	26
Customs duties	28	26
Other miscellaneous receipts	48	48
Total	2,416	2,568

The IRS estimated that there were about $345 billion in uncollected taxes, which is sometimes referred to as the "tax gap.".

== Total spending ==
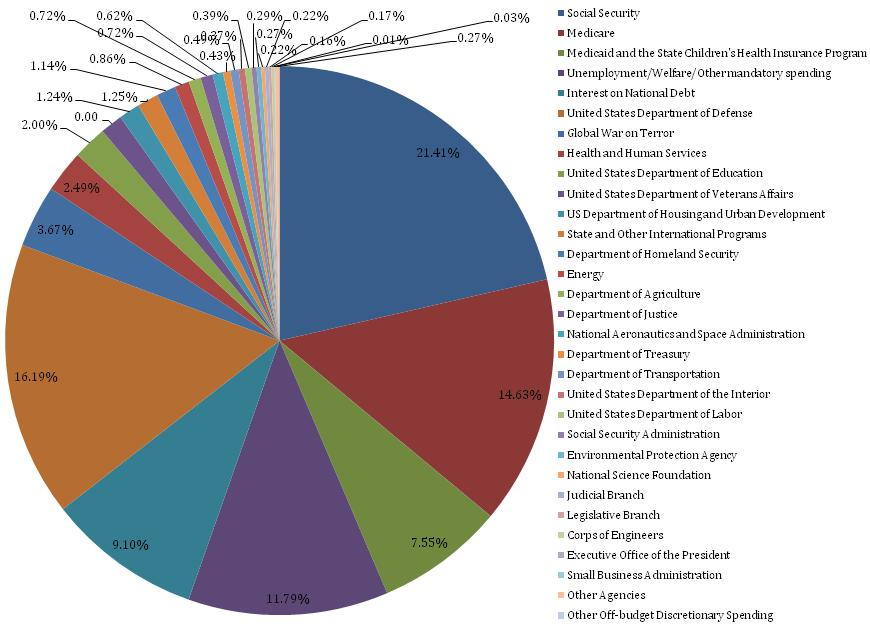
A pie chart representing spending by category for the US budget for 2007

The President's actual budget for 2007 totals $2.8 trillion. Percentages in parentheses indicate percentage change compared to 2006. This budget request is broken down by the following expenditures:

- $586.1 billion (+7.0%) - Social Security
- $548.8 billion (+9.0%) - Defense
- $394.5 billion (+12.4%) - Medicare
- $294.0 billion (+2.0%) - Unemployment and welfare
- $276.4 billion (+2.9%) - Medicaid and other health related
- $243.7 billion (+13.4%) - Interest on debt
- $89.9 billion (+1.3%) - Education and training
- $76.9 billion (+8.1%) - Transportation
- $72.6 billion (+5.8%) - Veterans' benefits
- $43.5 billion (+9.2%) - Administration of justice
- $33.1 billion (+5.7%) - Natural resources and environment
- $32.5 billion (+15.4%) - Foreign affairs
- $27.0 billion (+3.7%) - Agriculture
- $26.8 billion (+28.7%) - Community and regional development
- $25.0 billion (+4.0%) - Science and technology
- $20.5 billion (+0.8%) - Energy
- $20.1 billion (+11.4%) - General government

Much of the costs of the Iraq war and the Afghanistan war until FY2008 have been funded through supplemental appropriations or emergency supplemental appropriations, which are treated differently from regular appropriations bills. Senior congressional leaders have contended that those war costs, as much as possible, should go through the regular budget process, which provides for greater transparency. Determining the costs of the wars in Iraq and Afghanistan is complex. CBO has estimated that "war-related defense activities" in 2007 were "roughly $115 billion."

== 2007 total military budget ==
The total requested military budget of the United States for 2007 was $699 billion.

U.S. Military Budget - DoD Base Spending: The U.S. Department of Defense (DoD) has the single largest budget of any government agency in the discretionary budget. This department is responsible for the four branches - the Army, Air Force, Navy and Marine Corps. This includes the cost of base administration, pay for military members, and the costs of repairing and procuring equipment.

- FY 2006, Defense Department base budget expenditures were $411 billion, nearly half of net discretionary spending.
- FY 2007, it increased to $430 billion, still about half.
- FY 2008, it is projected to grow to $481 billion, or 52%.

U.S. Military Budget - War on Terror Base Spending : The War on Terror (WoT) incurs additional costs by other departments. When added to the DoD base spending, the amount comes to:

- $474 billion in FY 2006, which is 56% of net discretionary spending,
- $505 billion in FY 2007,
- $554 billion in FY 2008, nearly 60% of discretionary spending.
- FY 2006 Supplemental Funding : The Defense Department base budget also does not include “one time only” costs attributable to the War on Terror, which are submitted as Supplemental Funding.
  - In FY 2006, an additional $153 billion in Supplemental Funding was added to the base budget - the War on Terror received $120 billion, while $33 billion went primarily for Hurricane Katrina. As a result, 60% of last year's discretionary spending went to DoD/WoT.
- FY 2007 Supplemental Funding : For FY 2007, $70 billion has already been approved, while the President’s FY 2008 Budget requests an additional $102 billion. If approved by Congress, total FY 2007 spending for DoD/WoT would be $673 billion, or 64% of the net discretionary budget.
- FY 2008 Budget Proposal : For FY 2008, the President has requested the following:
  - The Defense Department Base Budget - $481 billion.
  - WoT(non-DoD) Base Budget - $73 billion.
  - Supplemental Funding for WoT - $145 billion.
  - Total requested Dod/WoT spending is $699 billion, or 65% of total net Discretionary spending.
