= United States v. Crimmins =

American legal case

- Court: United States Court of Appeals for the Second Circuit
- Full case name: United States v. Crimmins
- Decided: November 3, 1941
- Citation: 123 F.2d 271

Court membership
- Judges sitting: Learned Hand, Thomas Walter Swan, Augustus Noble Hand

Case opinions
- Majority: L. Hand, joined by a unanimous court

United States v. Crimmins, 123 F.2d 271 (2d Cir. 1941), was a case before the United States Court of Appeals for the Second Circuit about conspiracy to transport stolen securities in interstate commerce, 18 U.S.C. § 415 (1940 ed.). John D. Crimmins, a lawyer practicing in Syracuse, New York, was convicted for his part in a conspiracy in which he bought stolen securities from an accomplice who also lived in New York. Crimmins appealed on the grounds that he did not know the bonds had been transported across state lines.

Judge Learned Hand wrote the court's opinion. He reasoned that a jury may have found Crimmins guilty of the substantive offense of using interstate commerce in the commission of a crime because he knowingly bought stolen bonds even if he didn't know where they were from, but that "It is never permissible to enlarge the scope of the conspiracy itself by proving that some of the conspirators, unknown to the rest, have done what was beyond the reasonable intendment of the common understanding". According to Hand, people can only be charged for the actions of co-conspirators that were mutually agreed upon. He gave the analogy, "While one may, for instance, be guilty of running past a traffic light of whose existence one is ignorant, one cannot be guilty of conspiring to run past such a light, for one cannot agree to run past a light unless one supposes that there is a light to run past".

In United States v. Feola (1975), the Supreme Court rejected Hand's analogy, holding that conspiracy to assault a federal agent required no greater mens rea than the substantive crime of assault.
