= Bryan Crimmins =

Australian rules footballer, born 1919

Personal information
- Full name: Bryan Crimmins
- Born: 25 October 1919
- Died: 15 February 1998 (aged 78)
- Original team: Benalla
- Height: 185 cm (6 ft 1 in)
- Weight: 89 kg (196 lb)

Playing career^{1}
Years	Club	Games (Goals)
1944	Melbourne	1 (0)
- ^{1} Playing statistics correct to the end of 1944.

Bryan Crimmins (25 October 1919 – 15 February 1998) was an Australian rules footballer who played with Melbourne in the Victorian Football League (VFL). He was the father of Peter Crimmins.
