= Peter Crimmins =

Australian rules footballer (1948–1976)

- Crimmins with Hawthorn

Personal information
- Full name: Peter Crimmins
- Nickname: Crimmo
- Born: 8 July 1948
- Died: 28 September 1976 (aged 28)
- Original team: Assumption College
- Height: 173 cm (5 ft 8 in)
- Weight: 72 kg (159 lb)

Playing career^{1}
Years	Club	Games (Goals)
1966–1975	Hawthorn	176 (231)
- ^{1} Playing statistics correct to the end of 1975.

Career highlights
- VFL premiership player: 1971; Hawthorn captain: 1974–1975; Hawthorn Hall of Fame; Peter Crimmins Medal named in his honour

Peter Crimmins (8 July 1948 – 28 September 1976) was an Australian rules footballer who played for the Hawthorn Football Club in the Victorian Football League (VFL). "Crimmo" was known as a lightly built but courageous and skilful rover whose early passing from cancer is one of Australian football's saddest stories. Hawthorn subsequently named the club Best and Fairest award in his honour.

== VFL career ==
Crimmins was born in 1948, one of five sons to father Bryan, who had also played in the VFL, appearing in one game for Melbourne. He was educated at Assumption College and quickly gained attention of Victorian football scouts with his skilful and fearless style of play, on one occasion kicking ten goals roving for the school's senior team. Peter chose Hawthorn as his father was a policeman stationed at Hawthorn at the time.

Showing good form in the practice matches, Crimmins was one of five Hawthorn debutantes chosen for the opening game of the 1966 VFL season. In a game best remembered for Collingwood's Peter McKenna kicking twelve goals, Crimmins kicked two himself. The newspaper The Age said Crimmins looked a little light but showed great courage.

In the 1971 VFL Grand Final, Crimmins was among the best players afield as the Hawks came from behind to defeat St Kilda by seven points.

At the end of 1973, David Parkin stood down as captain; Peter Crimmins was elected to the position in his place.

== Cancer diagnosis ==
At the completion of the 1974 VFL season, Crimmins was diagnosed with testicular cancer. After surgery and two bouts of chemotherapy in 1975, he attempted to make a return, declaring that he was fit to play in the 1975 VFL Grand Final after playing five reserves games, including one final. Both the selection committee and Hawthorn's supporters were divided over whether he should play. Ultimately, the match committee decided against playing him in the game, with coach John Kennedy admitting they were fearful a knock could affect him. As he explained later: "It was very hard, it was a unique situation ... Peter wanted to play. The committee was divided. He didn't play. We'll never know what might have happened if he had played." The Hawks lost the Grand Final to North Melbourne.

== Crimmo's Cup ==
Throughout the next year Crimmins health deteriorated again, but by the end of the season Hawthorn was again facing North Melbourne for the 1976 VFL Grand Final. By this stage Crimmins was confined to his sickbed, unable to even attend the game, and with live television broadcasts of the Grand Final not introduced until 1977, he was reduced to merely listening to it on the radio. Just before the Hawthorn players took the field, Kennedy read out a telegram which Crimmins had sent to the club, saying: "Good luck to you and all the boys. It will be a long, hard, 100 minutes but I am sure you will be there at the end. Regards, Peter Crimmins." Kennedy implored his players to "Do it for the little fella", and later stated that he believed his team was never going to lose. Hawthorn won the game by thirty points to take the Premiership.

The night of the Grand Final, six of Crimmins' closest teammates took the premiership cup to Crimmins' house in the outer eastern suburbs of Melbourne to let him share in the celebrations. A press photographer accompanied them and a famous photo was published in the newspapers showing a wasted, reclining, yet beaming Crimmins holding the premiership cup surrounded by his jubilant teammates. The premiership victory became known around Hawthorn and in the football community as 'Crimmo's Cup' in recognition of the inspiration Crimmins provided to his team.

Crimmins died just three days after the game, aged 28. He was survived by his wife and two sons. The image of a stricken Crimmins holding the premiership cup and surrounded by teammates is captured in Jamie Cooper's painting The Game That Made Australia, commissioned by the AFL in 2008 to celebrate the 150th anniversary of the sport.

== The Number 5 ==
Crimmins' number 5 was retired following his death, with the plan to bring the number back in the event one of his sons was able to play for the Hawks. Once it became clear this would not happen, a decision was made by the family to return the jumper to circulation, with the family choosing the player who best exemplified Crimmins to wear the number. In 1993, Andy Collins was awarded the jumper. In 1997, the jumper was awarded to Daniel Harford. In 2004, the jumper was awarded to Sam Mitchell, who would go on to wear the jumper in four premierships, one as captain, and to five Peter Crimmins Medals, the Hawthorn Best and Fairest that was renamed in his honour. Following Mitchell leaving the club in 2016, the jumper was awarded to Ryan Burton, and following his trade to Port Adelaide in 2018, James Worpel was awarded the jumper.

Crimmins' jumper was hung in the boardroom at Glenferrie Oval until the club left in 2005. It was then moved to the boardroom at Waverley Park, and it now is situated in the Hawthorn museum.

== Honours and achievements ==
Hawthorn

- VFL premiership player: 1971
- 2× Minor premiership: 1971, 1975

Individual

- Hawthorn Hall of Fame
- Hawthorn life member

== Bibliography ==
- Eddy, Dan (2020). Crimmo : the Peter Crimmins story. Melbourne, Victoria: The Slattery Media Group. ISBN 9780975836255.
