= Congressional Budget and Impoundment Control Act of 1974 =

United States law on role of Congress in budgeting

Budget Act of 1974
- Long title: An Act to establish a new congressional budget process; to establish Committees on the Budget in each House; to establish a Congressional Budget Office; to establish a procedure providing congressional control over the impoundment of funds by the executive branch; and for other purposes.
- Enacted by: the 93rd United States Congress
- Effective: July 12, 1974

Citations
- Public law: 93-344
- Statutes at Large: 88 Stat. 297

Codification
- Titles amended: 2 U.S.C.: Congress

Legislative history
- Introduced in the House as H.R. 7130 by Al Ullman (D-OR) on April 18, 1973; Committee consideration by House Rules; Passed the House on December 5, 1973 (386-23); Passed the Senate on March 22, 1974 (80-0, in lieu of S. 1541); Reported by the joint conference committee on June 11, 1974; agreed to by the House on June 18, 1974 (401-6) and by the Senate on June 21, 1974 (75-0); Signed into law by President Richard Nixon on July 12, 1974

Major amendments
- Gramm–Rudman–Hollings Balanced Budget Act; Budget Control Act of 2011

United States Supreme Court cases
- Train v. City of New York

The Congressional Budget and Impoundment Control Act of 1974 (Note: Pub. L. 93–344, 88 Stat. 297, 2 U.S.C. §§ 601–688; officially titled An Act to establish a new congressional budget process; to establish Committees on the Budget in each House; to establish a Congressional Budget Office; to establish a procedure providing congressional control over the impoundment of funds by the executive branch; and for other purposes.) (ICA) is a United States federal law that governs the role of the Congress in the United States budget process.

Titles I through IX of the law are also known as the Congressional Budget Act of 1974.

== Congressional budget process ==
Titles I through IX of the law are known as the Congressional Budget Act of 1974. Title II created the Congressional Budget Office. Title III governs the procedures by which Congress annually adopts a budget resolution, a concurrent resolution that is not signed by the president, which sets fiscal policy for the Congress. This budget resolution sets limits on revenues and spending that may be enforced in Congress through procedural objections called points of order. The budget resolution can also specify that a budget reconciliation bill be written, which the Congress will then consider under expedited procedures.

== Later amendments ==
The act has been amended several times, including provisions in the Balanced Budget and Emergency Deficit Control Act of 1985, the Budget Enforcement Act of 1990, and the Balanced Budget Act of 1997. The original 1974 legislation, however, remains the basic blueprint for budget procedures today.

== Byrd Rule ==
The limitation on debate that prevents a budget reconciliation bill from being filibustered in the Senate (requiring a three-fifths vote to end debate) led to frequent attempts to attach amendments unrelated to the budget to the reconciliation bills. In response, the budget reconciliation acts of 1985, 1986, and 1990 adopted the "Byrd Rule" (Section 313 of the Budget Act). The Byrd Rule allows Senators to raise points of order (which can be waived by a three-fifths majority of Senators) against provisions in the reconciliation bills that are "extraneous".

Provisions are considered extraneous if they:

1. do not produce a change in outlays or revenues;
2. produce changes in outlays or revenue which are merely incidental to the non-budgetary components of the provision;
3. are outside the jurisdiction of the committee that submitted the title or provision for inclusion in the reconciliation measure;
4. increase outlays or decrease revenue if the provision's title, as a whole, fails to achieve the Senate reporting committee's reconciliation instructions;
5. increase net outlays or decrease revenue during a fiscal year after the years covered by the reconciliation bill unless the provision's title, as a whole, remains budget neutral; or
6. contain recommendations regarding the OASDI (social security) trust funds.

=== Sunset provisions ===
Since the reconciliation bill may cover as many as ten years, the fifth provision can have the effect of requiring that any tax cut or spending increase must be approved by a three-fifths majority, or else the law must return to its previous state after ten years. This is responsible for the use of sunset clauses in several recent budget acts, when proposed tax cuts commanded majority support but not the necessary three-fifths majority to suspend the Byrd Rule. For example, many of the provisions of the Economic Growth and Tax Relief Reconciliation Act of 2001 and the Jobs and Growth Tax Relief Reconciliation Act of 2003 would have expired as soon as fiscal year 2010 if not extended. The provisions that were to expire including the $1000 per child tax credit, the 10% income tax bracket for low-income workers, and the deduction for state and local sales taxes paid. The expiration dates in those Acts were inserted in order to avoid Byrd Rule points of order. Provisions against which a Byrd Rule point of order is sustained are colloquially referred to as "Byrd droppings".

== Impoundment ==
Title X of the Act, also known as the Impoundment Control Act of 1974, specifies that the president may request that Congress rescind appropriated funds. If both the Senate and the House of Representatives have not approved a rescission proposal (by passing legislation) within forty-five days of continuous session, any funds being withheld must be made available for obligation. Congress is not required to vote on the request and has ignored most presidential requests. In response, some have called for a line item veto to strengthen the rescission power and force Congress to vote on the disputed funds.

The Act was passed because Congressional representatives thought that President Nixon had abused his power of impoundment by withholding funds for programs he opposed. The Act, especially after Train v. City of New York (1975), effectively removed the presidential power of impoundment.

In late November 2019, the Impoundment Control Act made news during the Trump impeachment investigation, when two budget office staffers resigned over their concerns over apparent improprieties regarding the hold of approved Ukraine military funds. Among the concerns was the questionable transfer of decision-making authority to Michael Duffey, a political appointee. Further emails released showed that Acting Undersecretary of Defense (Comptroller) Elaine McCusker emailed the White House Office of Management and Budget expressing her concerns beginning in July 2019 that the White House withholding funds from Ukraine could be a violation of the Impoundment Control Act.

On January 16, 2020, the Government Accountability Office (GAO) issued a decision on the "Matter of: Office of Management and Budget—Withholding of Ukraine Security Assistance." The GAO report found:

"In the summer of 2019, OMB withheld from obligation approximately $214 million appropriated to DOD for security assistance to Ukraine. (...) OMB withheld amounts by issuing a series of nine apportionment schedules with footnotes that made all unobligated balances for the Ukraine Security Assistance Initiative (USAI) unavailable for obligation. (...) Pursuant to our role under the ICA, we are issuing this decision. (...) we conclude that OMB withheld the funds from obligation for an unauthorized reason in violation of the ICA.1 See 2 U.S.C. § 684. We also question actions regarding funds appropriated to the Department of State (State) for security assistance to Ukraine."

The Center for Public Integrity found that "OMB's actions did not comply with any of the exceptions to the law's demand that a president carry out congressional spending orders, the GAO said in its nine-page report. 'OMB withheld funds for a policy reason, which is not permitted,' the report states. 'Therefore we conclude that OMB violated' the act."

The ability of the President to impound funds again came into question during the 2025 United States federal government grant pause resulting in 39 investigations by the GAO.

== See also ==
- Reconciliation (United States Congress)
