= List of Republicans who opposed the Donald Trump 2024 presidential campaign =

A range of notable Republicans openly expressed opposition to President Donald Trump's 2024 campaign for president of the United States.

== Former Trump administration officials ==
=== U.S. vice president ===
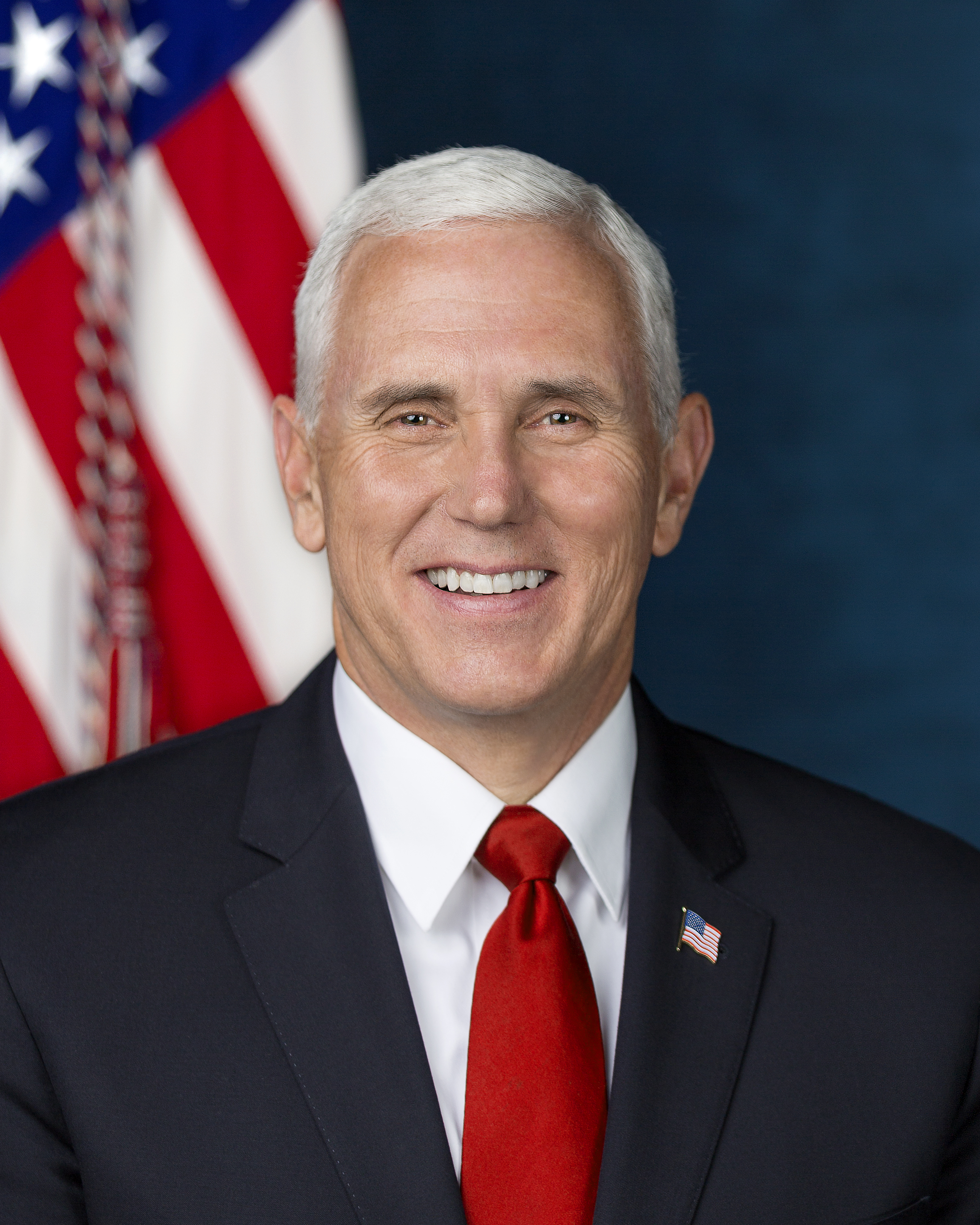
Mike Pence

- Mike Pence, U.S. vice president (2017–2021) under Trump, governor of Indiana (2013–2017), U.S. representative from IN-06 (2003–2013), U.S. representative from IN-02 (2001–2003) (ran against Trump in the Republican primaries)

=== Cabinet-level officials ===
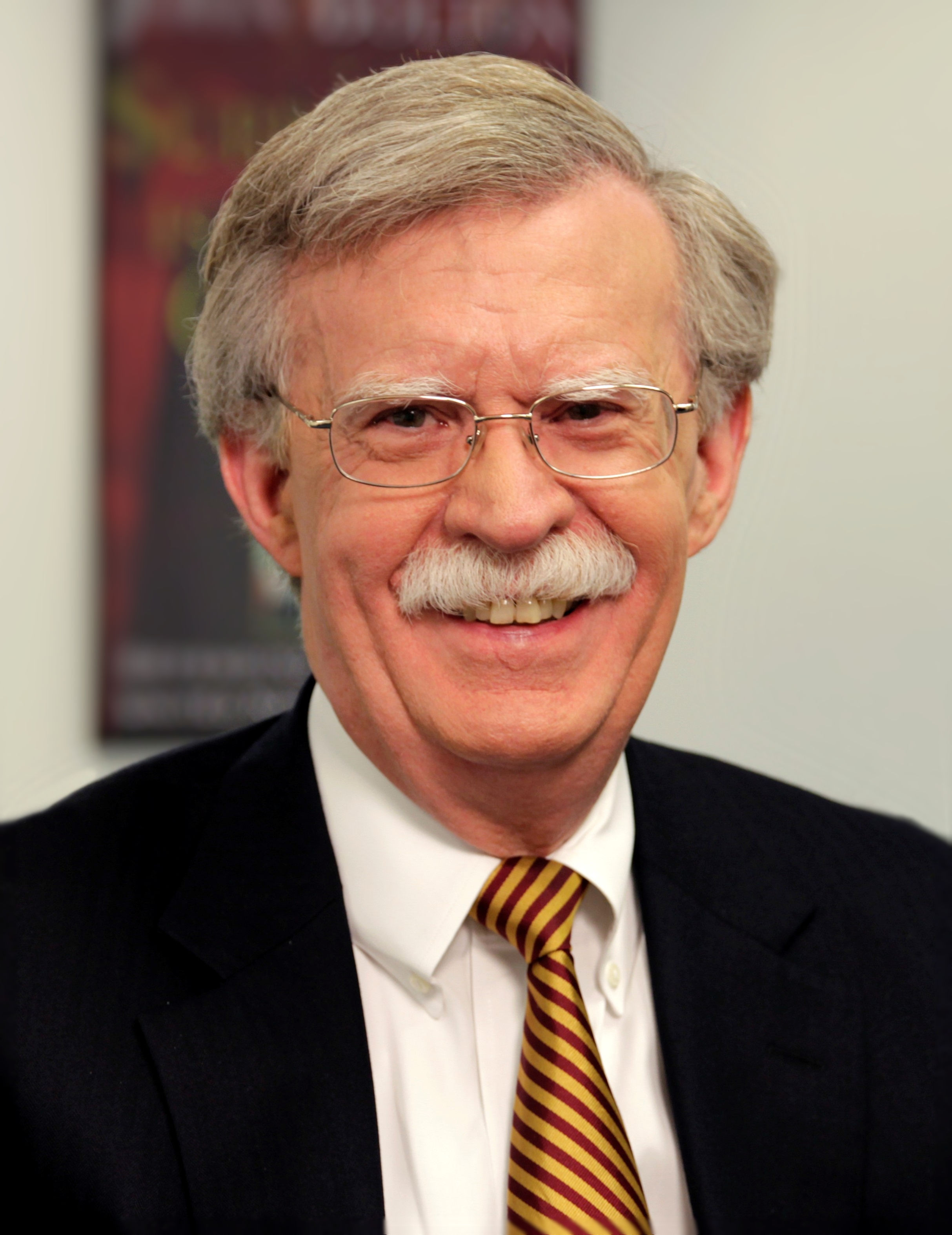
John Bolton

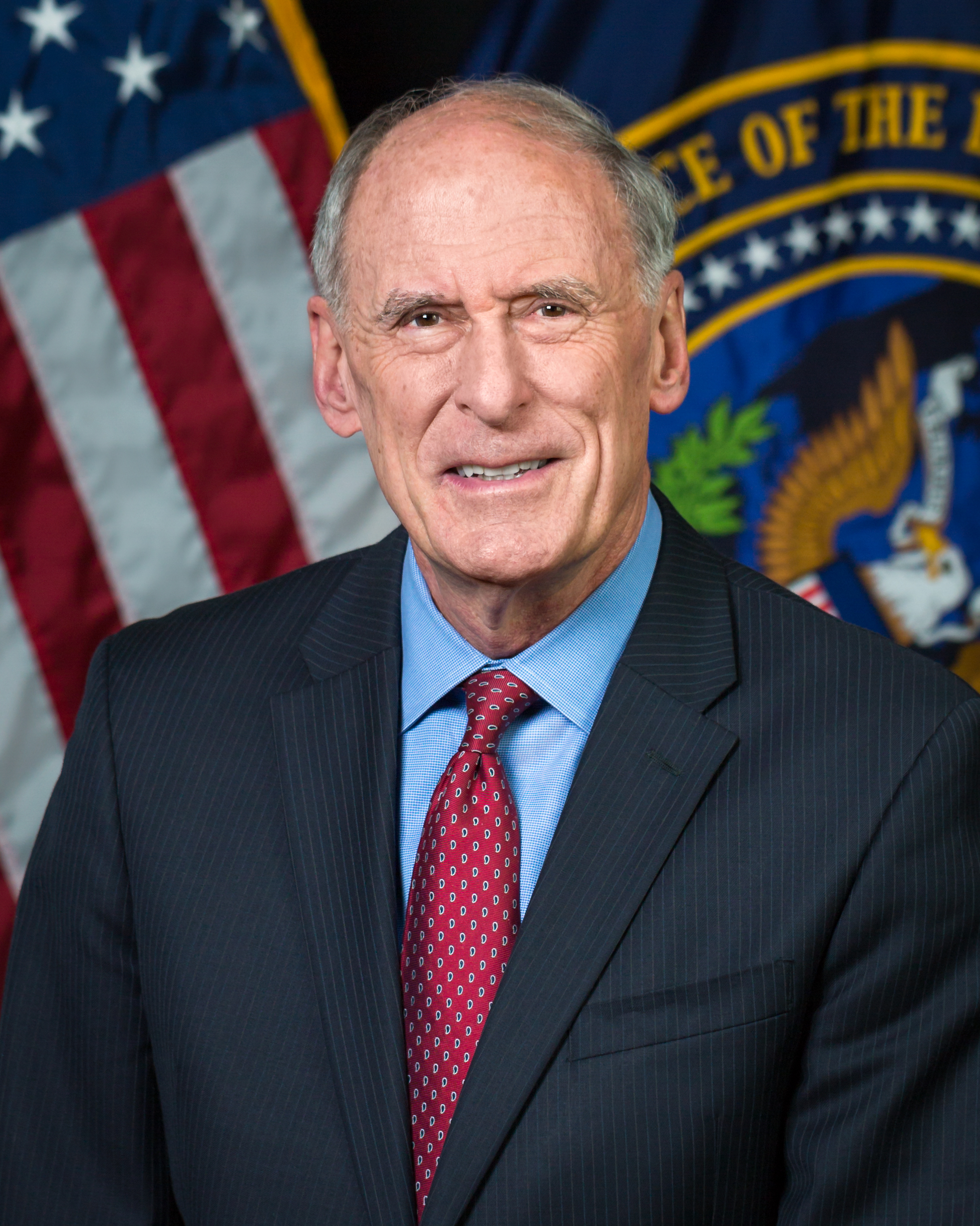
Dan Coats

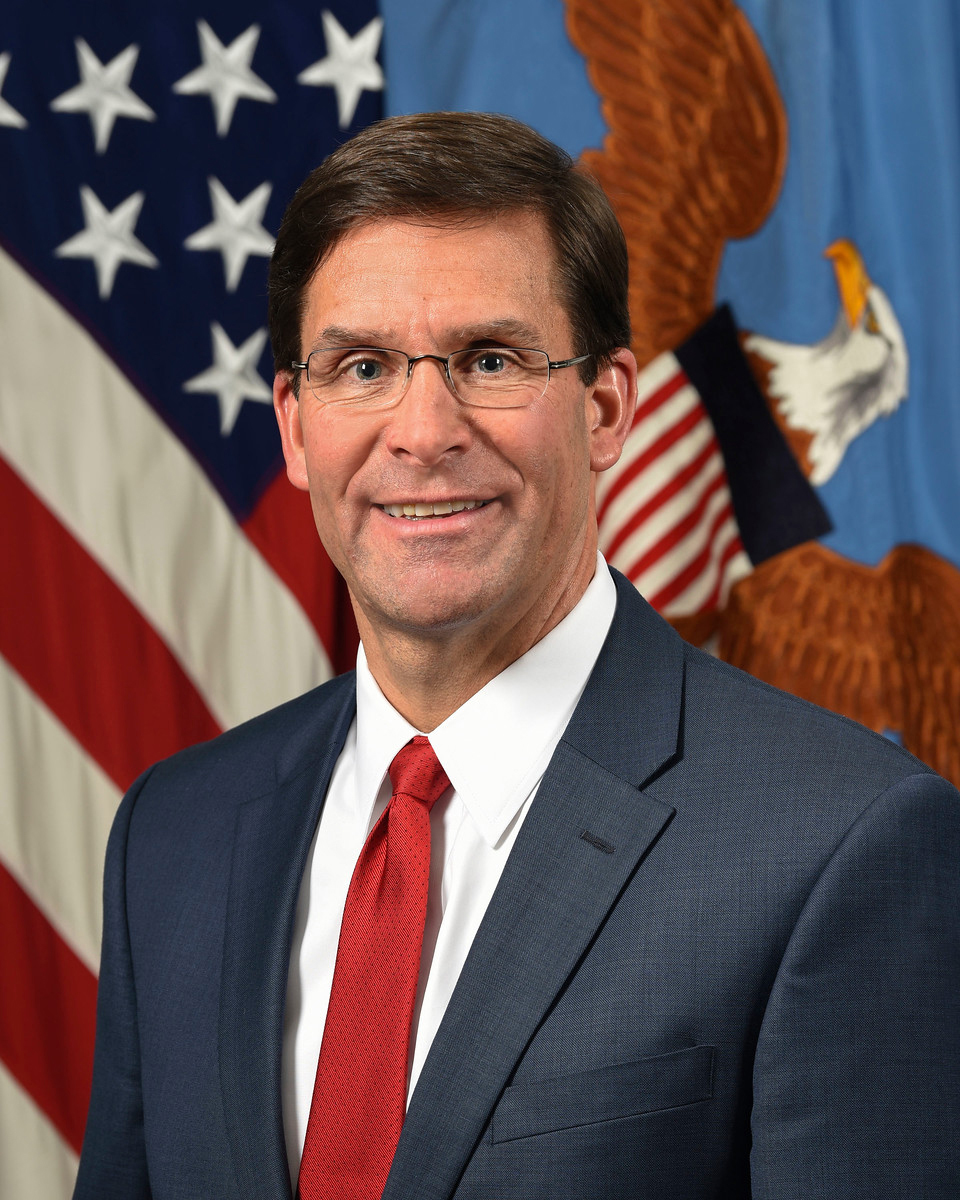
Mark Esper

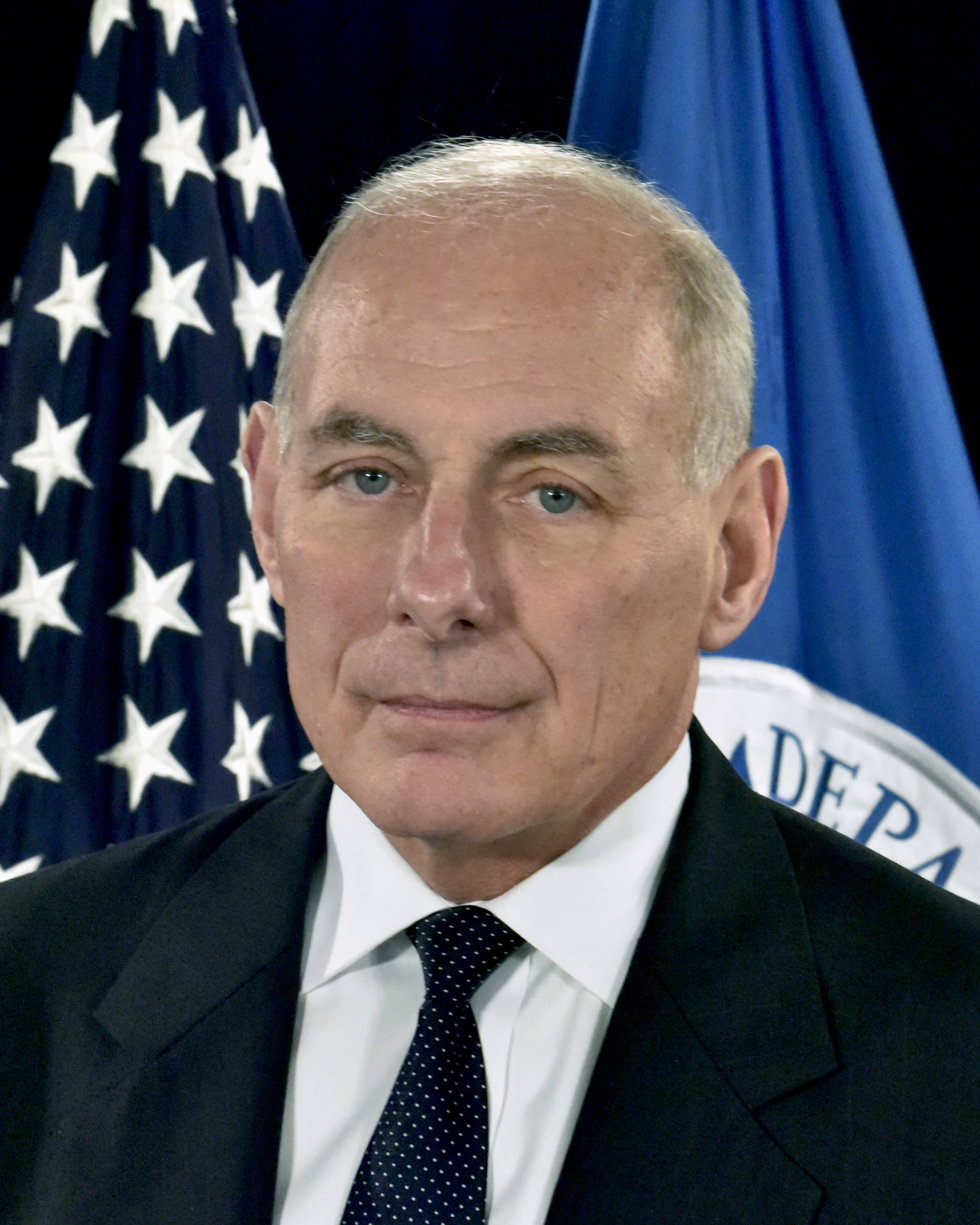
John F. Kelly

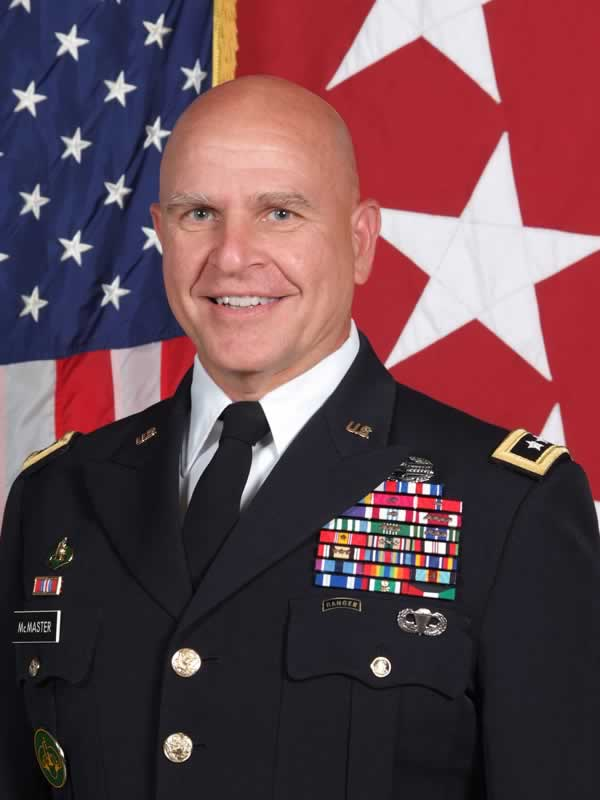
H. R. McMaster

Trump cabinet members who opposed his election in 2024 include:

- John Bolton, U.S. National Security advisor (2018–2019), Ambassador to the United Nations (2005–2006)
- Dan Coats, director of National Intelligence (2017–2019), U.S. senator from Indiana (1989–1999; 2011–2017) (endorsed Mike Pence)
- Mark Esper, U.S. secretary of defense (2019–2020), U.S. secretary of the Army (2017–2019)

Only half of Trump's first term cabinet officials endorsed his 2024 campaign.

=== White House officials ===
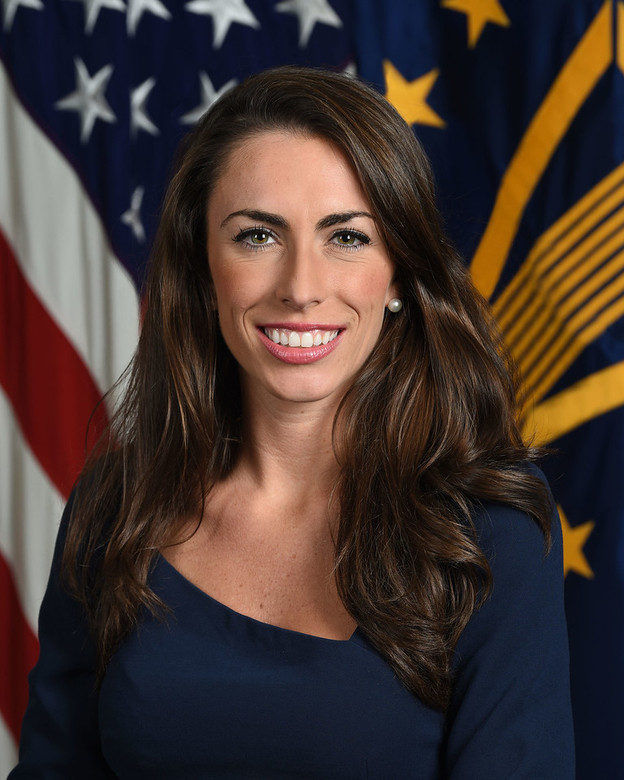
Alyssa Farah Griffin

- Alyssa Farah Griffin, White House director of strategic communications (2020), press secretary of the U.S. Department of Defense (2019–2020), press secretary to the vice president (2017–2019) and co-host of The View (endorsed Kamala Harris)
- Stephanie Grisham, White House communications director, chief of staff to the First Lady (2020-2021) and White House press secretary (2019–2020) (endorsed Kamala Harris)
- Sarah Matthews, deputy White House press secretary (2020–2021) (endorsed Kamala Harris)
- Anthony Scaramucci, White House communications director (2017) (endorsed Kamala Harris)
- Marc Short, chief of staff to the vice president (2019–2021) (endorsed Mike Pence)

=== Other executive branch officials ===
- Greg Brower, assistant director of the Federal Bureau of Investigation (2017), U.S. attorney for the District of Nevada (2008–2009) (endorsed Kamala Harris)
- John Mitnick, general counsel of the U.S. Department of Homeland Security (2018–2019) (endorsed Kamala Harris)
- Richard V. Spencer, U.S. secretary of the Navy (2017–2019)
- Olivia Troye, Homeland Security and Counterterrorism advisor and lead COVID-19 advisor to the vice president (2018–2020) (endorsed Kamala Harris)
- William H. Webster, chair of the Homeland Security Advisory Council (2005–2020), director of Central Intelligence (1987–1991), director of the Federal Bureau of Investigation (1978–1987), judge of the U.S. Court of Appeals for the Eighth Circuit (1973–1978) (endorsed Kamala Harris)

== Previous administration executive branch officials ==
=== U.S. vice president ===
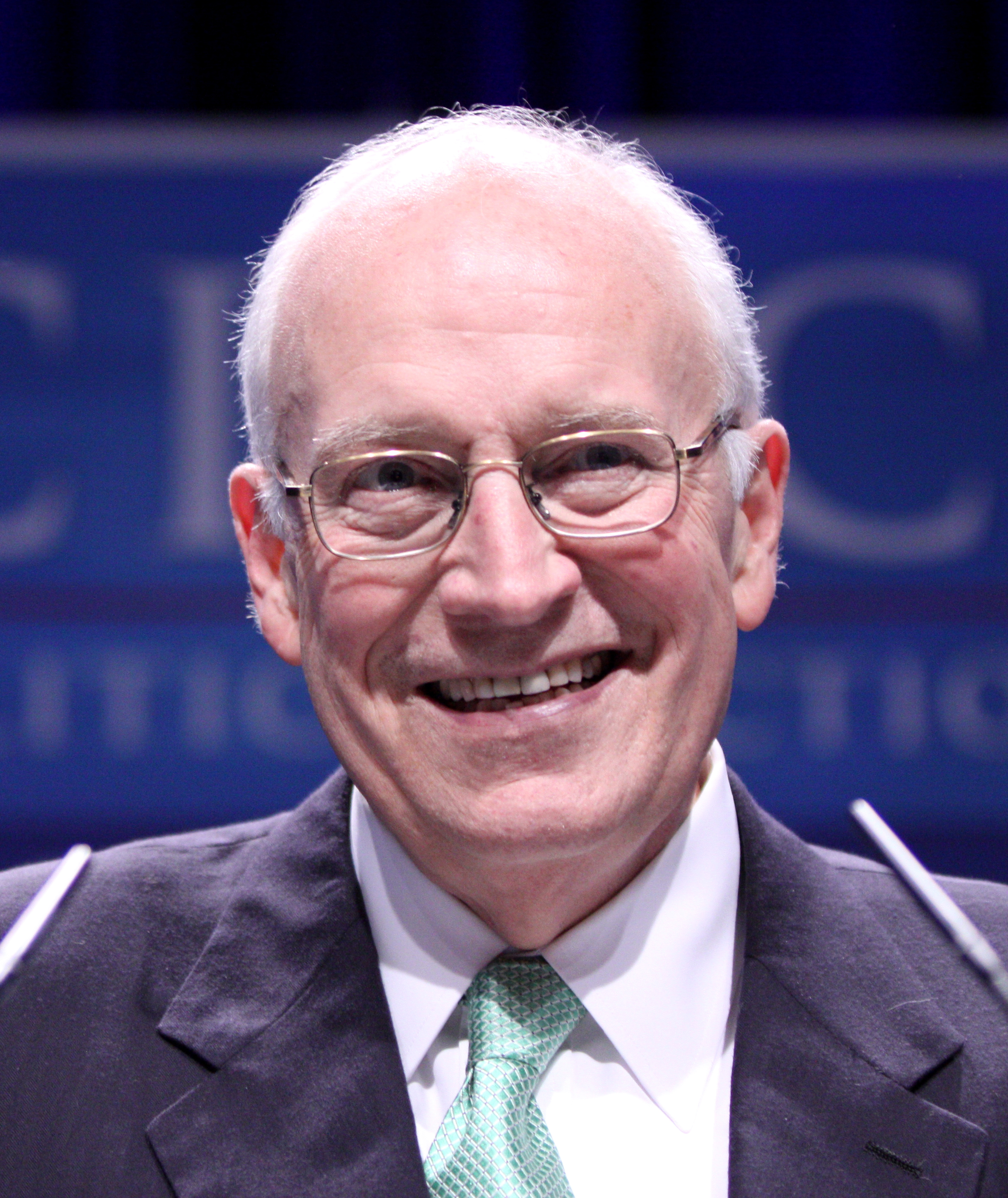
Dick Cheney

- Dick Cheney, U.S. vice president (2001–2009), U.S. secretary of defense (1989–1993), U.S. representative from Wyoming's at-large congressional district (1979–1989), White House chief of staff (1975–1977), White House deputy chief of staff (1974–1975) (endorsed Kamala Harris)

=== Cabinet-level officials ===
- William Cohen, U.S. secretary of defense (1997–2001), U.S. senator from Maine (1979–1997) (endorsed Kamala Harris)
- John Danforth, U.S. ambassador to the United Nations (2004–2005), U.S. senator from Missouri (1976–1995)
- Stuart M. Gerson, acting U.S. attorney general (1993), United States assistant attorney general for the Civil Division (1989–1993) (endorsed Kamala Harris)
- Alberto Gonzales, U.S. attorney general (2005–2007) (endorsed Kamala Harris)
- Chuck Hagel, U.S. secretary of defense (2013–2015), co-chair of President's Intelligence Advisory Board (2009–2013), U.S. senator from Nebraska (1997–2009) (endorsed Kamala Harris)
- Carla Anderson Hills, U.S. trade representative (1989–1993), U.S. secretary of housing and urban development (1975–1977) (endorsed Kamala Harris)
- Peter Keisler, acting U.S. attorney general (2007), United States assistant attorney general for the Civil Division (2003–2007), acting U.S. associate attorney general (2002–2003) (endorsed Kamala Harris)
- Ray LaHood, U.S. secretary of transportation (2009–2013), U.S. representative from IL-18 (1995–2009), member of the Illinois House of Representatives from the 72nd district (1982–1983) (endorsed Kamala Harris)
- John Negroponte, U.S. deputy secretary of state (2007–2009), director of National Intelligence (2005–2007), deputy National Security advisor (1987–1989) (endorsed Kamala Harris)
- William Howard Taft IV, acting U.S. secretary of defense (1989), legal adviser of the Department of State (2001–2005), U.S. ambassador to NATO (1989–1992), U.S. deputy secretary of defense (1984–1989) and great-grandson of President William Howard Taft (endorsed Kamala Harris)
- Ann Veneman, U.S. secretary of agriculture (2001–2005) (endorsed Kamala Harris)
- Robert Zoellick, U.S. trade representative (2001–2005), United States deputy secretary of state (2005–2006), White House deputy chief of staff (1992–1993) (endorsed Kamala Harris)

=== White House officials ===
- Phillip D. Brady, White House staff secretary (1991–1993), White House cabinet secretary (1989) (endorsed Kamala Harris)
- James W. Cicconi, White House staff secretary (1989–1990) (endorsed Kamala Harris)
- Frank Donatelli, White House director of political and intergovernmental affairs (1987–1989) (endorsed Kamala Harris)
- Bobbie Kilberg, director of the Office of Public Liaison (1989–1992) (endorsed Chris Christie)
- Harriet Miers, White House counsel (2005–2007), White House deputy chief of staff (2003–2005), and White House staff secretary (2001–2003)

=== Other executive branch officials ===
- John B. Bellinger III, legal adviser of the Department of State (2005–2009) (endorsed Kamala Harris)
- Robert D. Blackwill, U.S. ambassador to India (2001–2003) (endorsed Kamala Harris)
- Richard R. Burt, U.S. ambassador to West Germany (1985–1989), assistant secretary of state for European and Eurasian Affairs (1983–1985) (endorsed Kamala Harris)
- Eliot A. Cohen, counselor of the U.S. Department of State (2007–2009) (endorsed Kamala Harris)
- Chester Crocker, assistant secretary of state for African affairs (1981–1989) (endorsed Kamala Harris)
- Michael Donley, U.S. secretary of the Air Force (2008–2013) (endorsed Kamala Harris)
- Eric S. Edelman, under secretary of defense for policy (2005–2009), U.S. ambassador to Turkey (2003–2005), U.S. ambassador to Finland (1998–2001) (endorsed Kamala Harris)
- Richard A. Falkenrath, deputy assistant to the president and deputy Homeland Security advisor (2003–2004) (endorsed Kamala Harris)
- Jendayi Frazer, assistant secretary of state for African affairs (2005–2009), U.S. ambassador to South Africa (2004–2005) (endorsed Kamala Harris)
- Mary Kramer, U.S. ambassador to Barbados (2004–2006) (endorsed Nikki Haley)
- Frank Lavin, U.S. ambassador to Singapore (2001–2005), White House director of political affairs (1987–1989) (endorsed Nikki Haley)
- John Lehman, U.S. secretary of the Navy (1981–1987)
- Rosario Marin, U.S. treasurer (2001–2003), mayor of Huntington Park, California (1999–2000), member of the Huntington Park, California City Council (1994–2001) (endorsed Kamala Harris)
- Sean O'Keefe, administrator of NASA (2001–2004), secretary of the Navy (1992–1993) (endorsed Kamala Harris)
- Jeanne Phillips, U.S. ambassador to the OECD (2001–2002)
- Victor H. Reis, assistant director for National Security and Space in the Office of Science and Technology Policy (1981–1983) (endorsed Kamala Harris)
- Larry Thompson, U.S. deputy attorney general (2001–2003), U.S. attorney for the Northern District of Georgia (1982–1986) (endorsed Kamala Harris)
- Robert H. Tuttle, U.S. ambassador to the United Kingdom (2005–2009) (endorsed Kamala Harris)
- Matthew Waxman, deputy assistant secretary of defense for detainee affairs (2004–2005) (endorsed Kamala Harris)

=== Other administration officials and campaign staff ===
- 1,043 former high-ranking national security officials (endorsed Kamala Harris) (not all are Republican)
- 304 alumni for Reagan, Bush, McCain & Romney (endorsed Kamala Harris)
- 238 former officials and staff for U.S. Presidents George W. Bush (2001–2009) and George H. W. Bush (1989–1993), and U.S. presidential candidates Mitt Romney (2012) and John McCain (2008) (endorsed Kamala Harris)
- Over 100 former Republican national security officials (endorsed Kamala Harris)
- 17 former officials and staff for U.S. President Ronald Reagan (1981–1989) (endorsed Kamala Harris)

== U.S. senators ==
=== Current ===
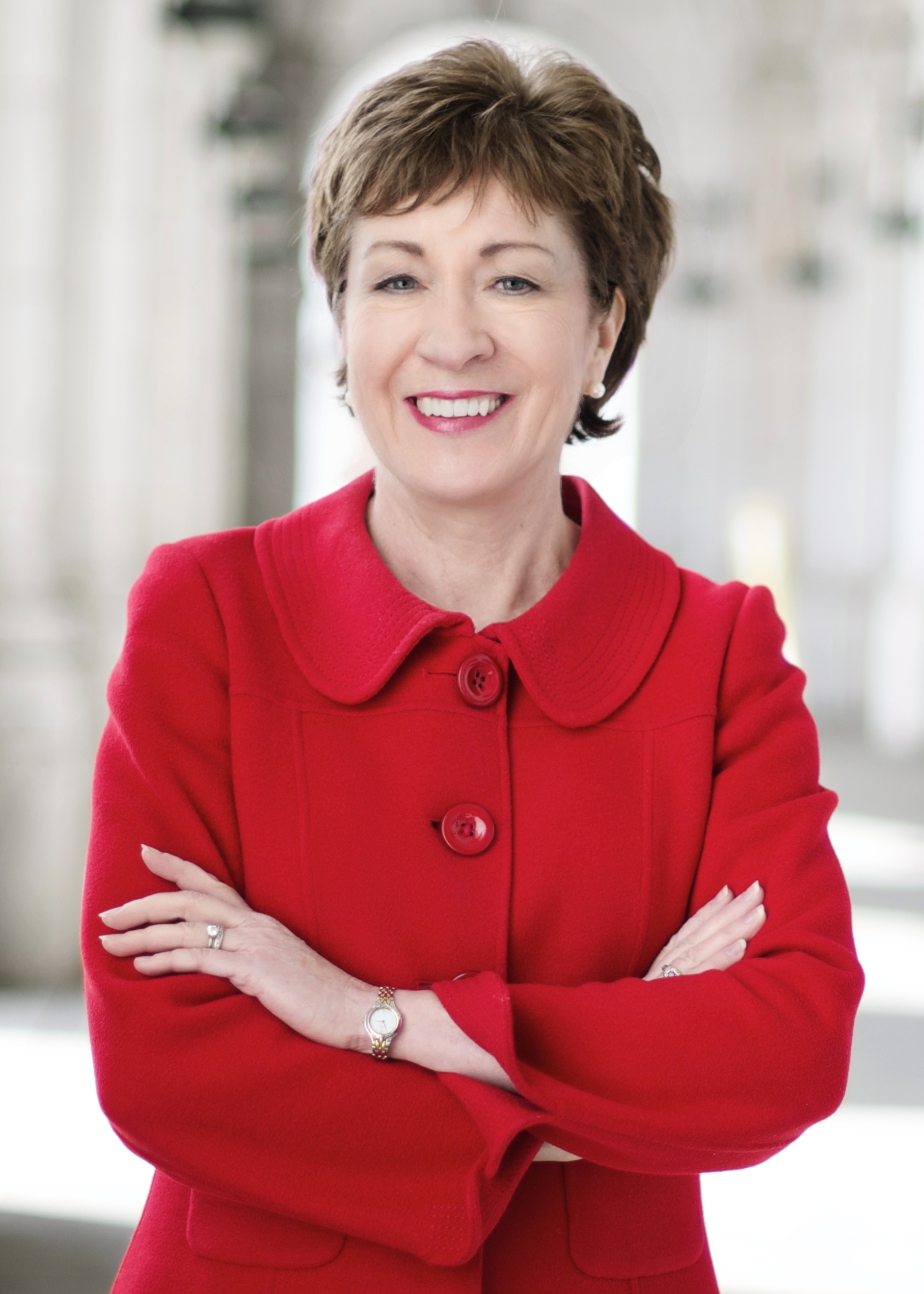
Susan Collins

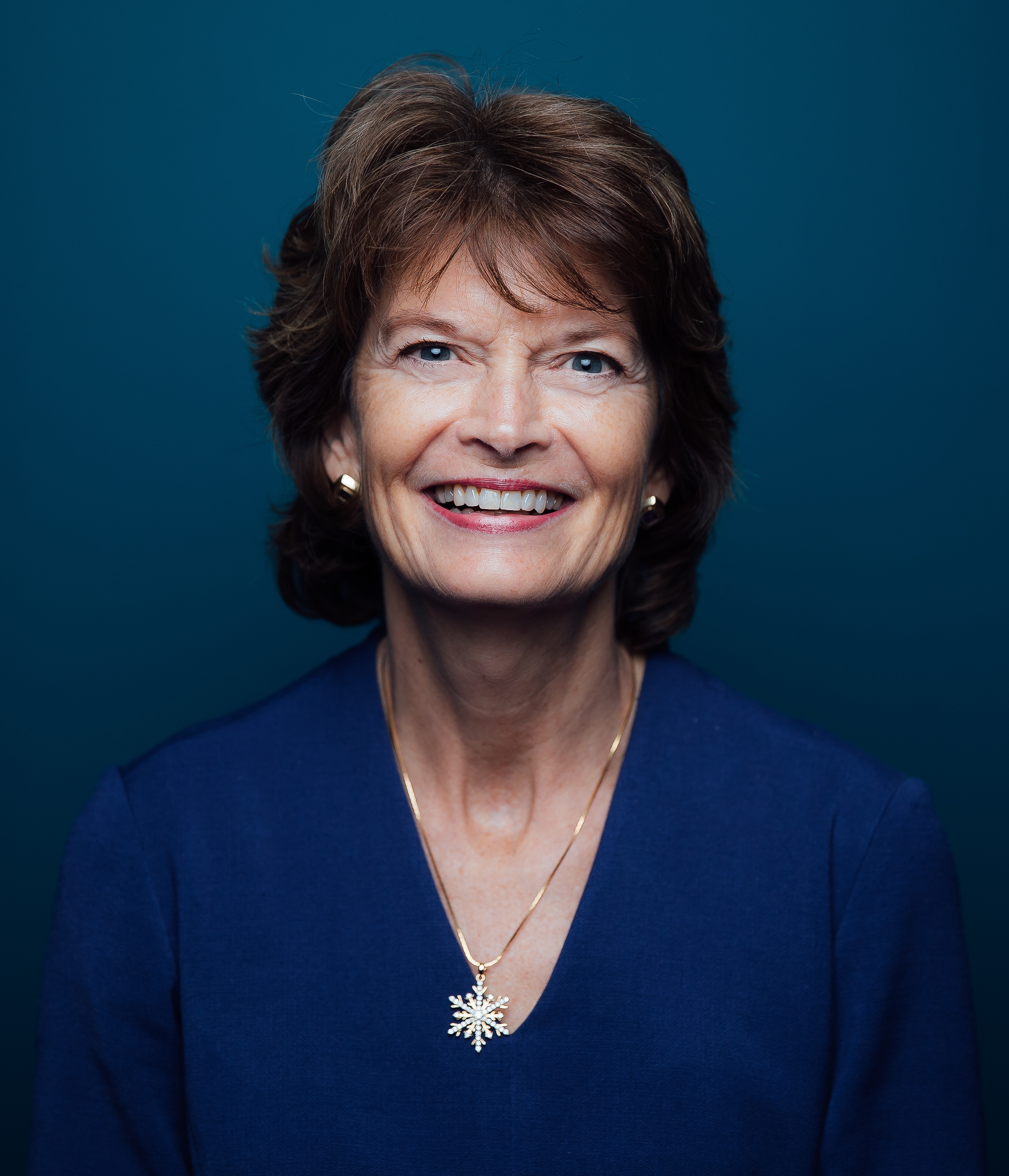
Lisa Murkowski

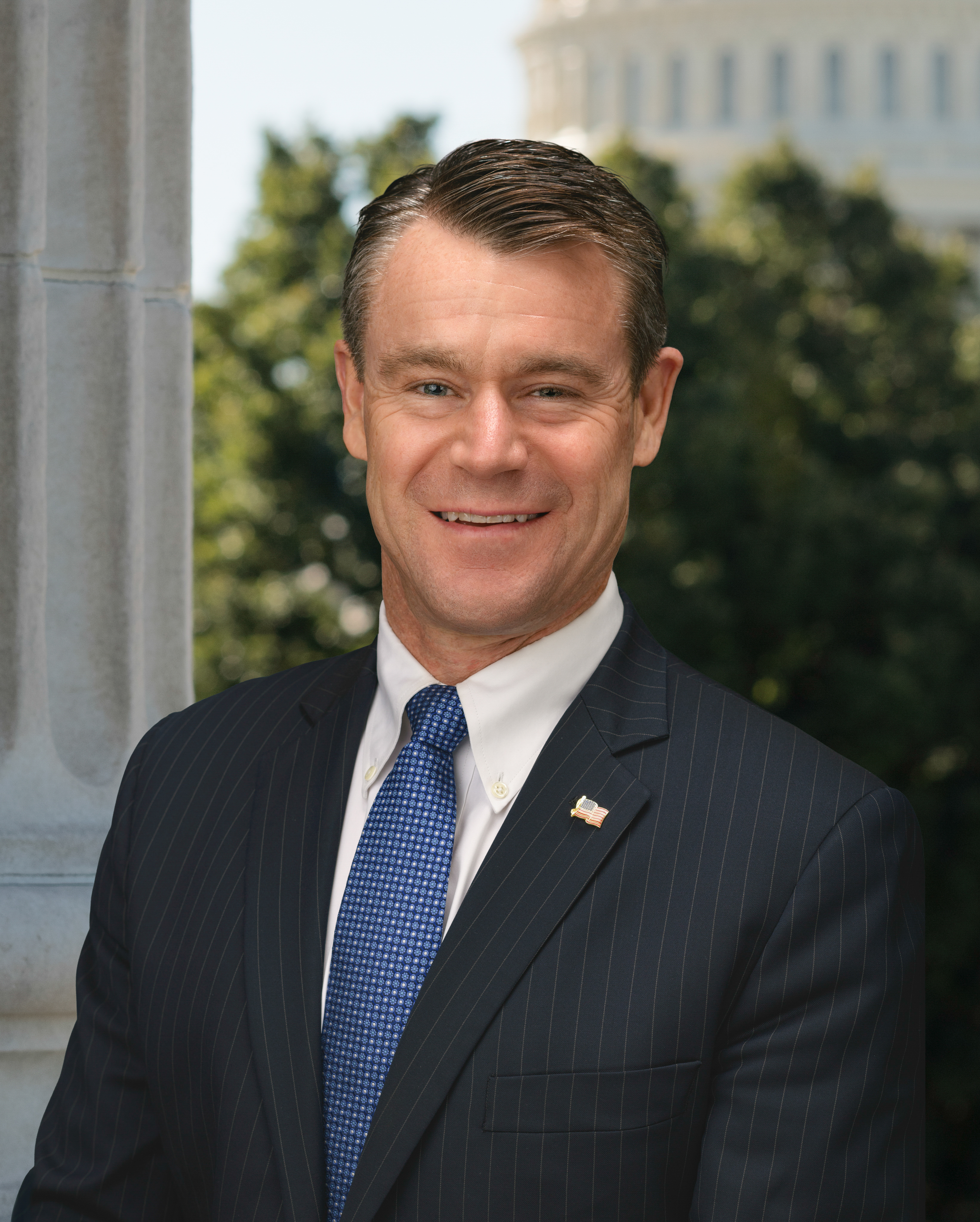
Todd Young

- Susan Collins, U.S. senator from Maine (1997–present) (wrote in Nikki Haley)
- Lisa Murkowski, U.S. senator from Alaska (2002–present) (endorsed Nikki Haley)
- Todd Young, U.S. senator from Indiana (2017–present), U.S. representative from IN-09 (2011–2017)

=== Former ===
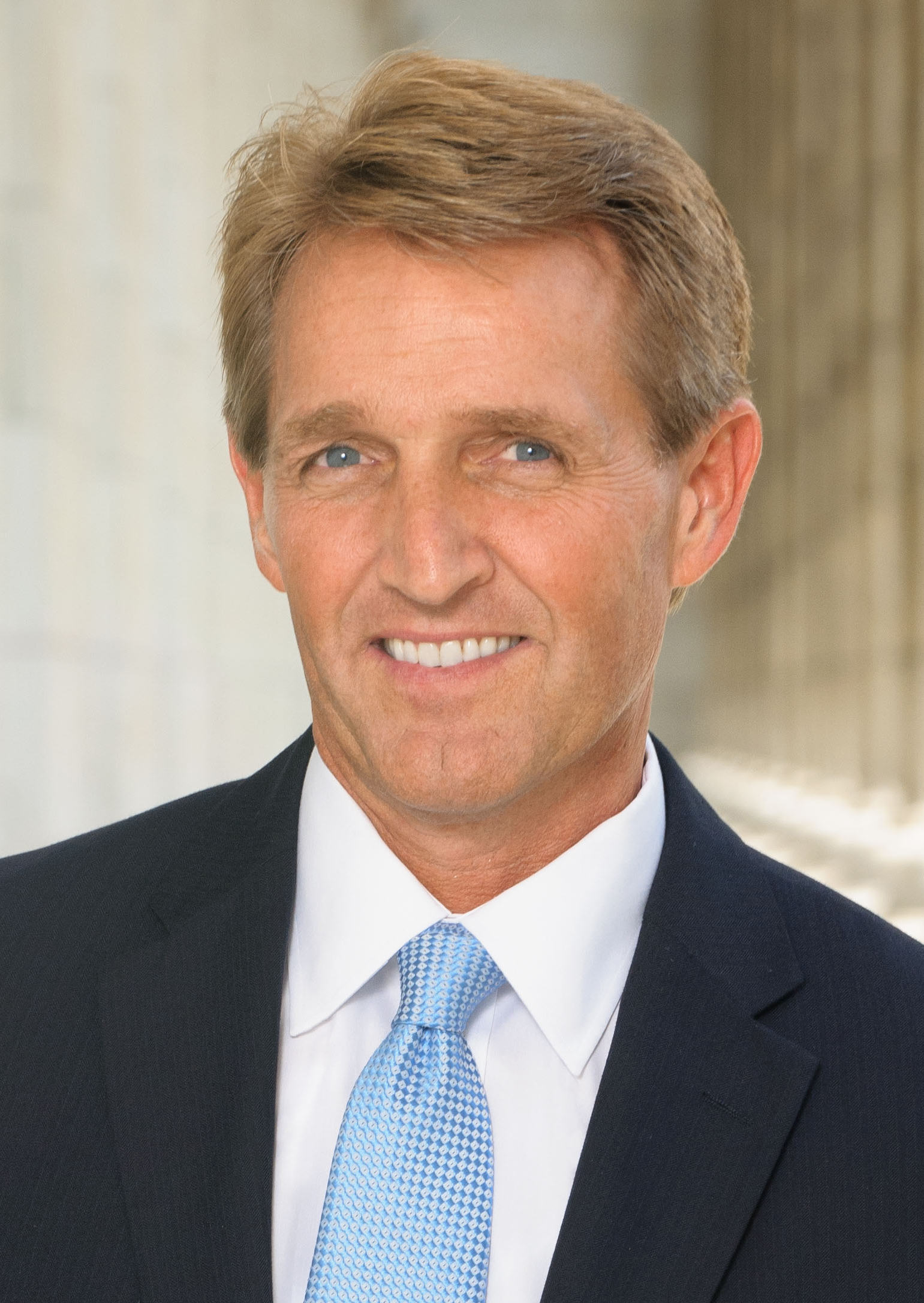
Jeff Flake

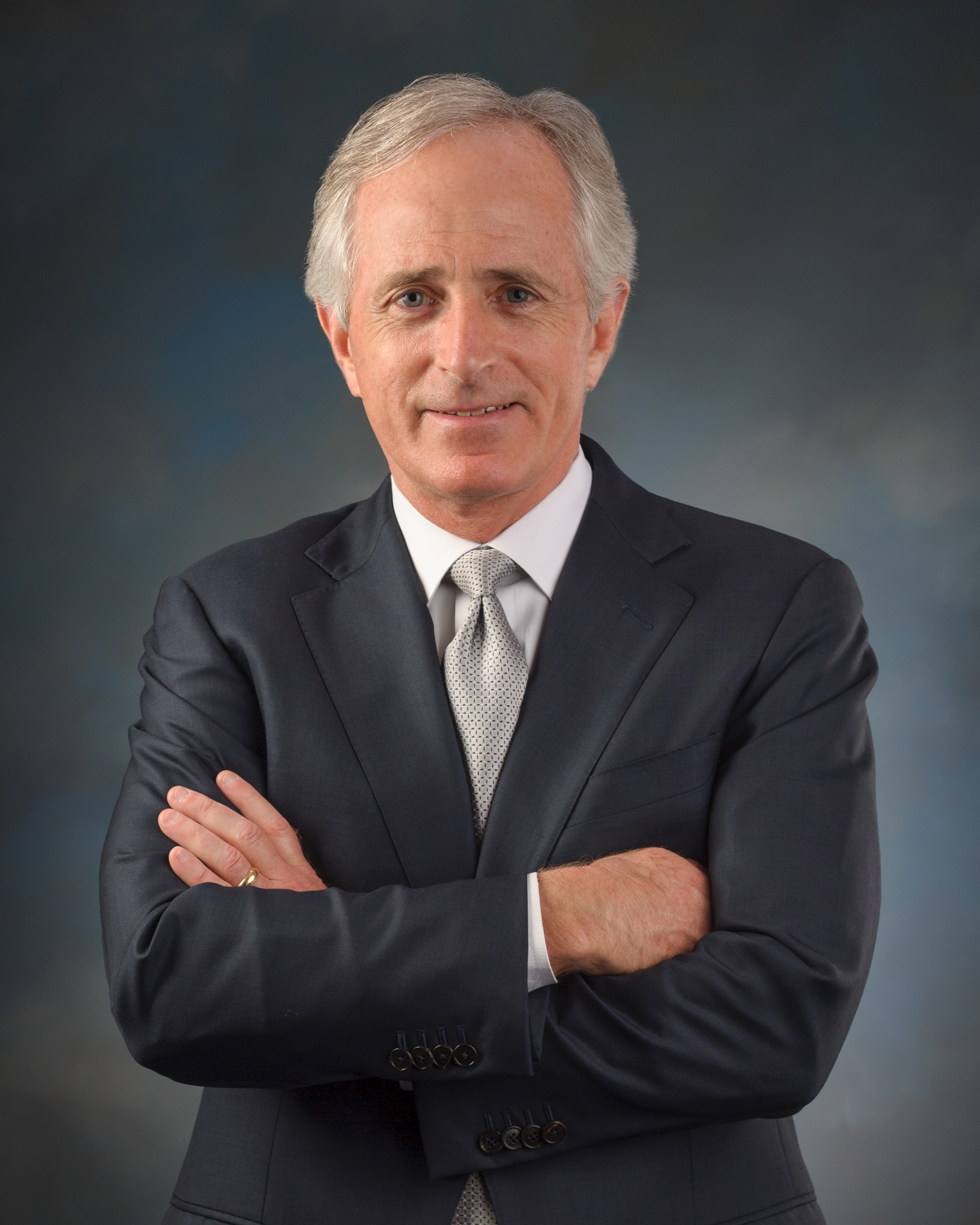
Bob Corker

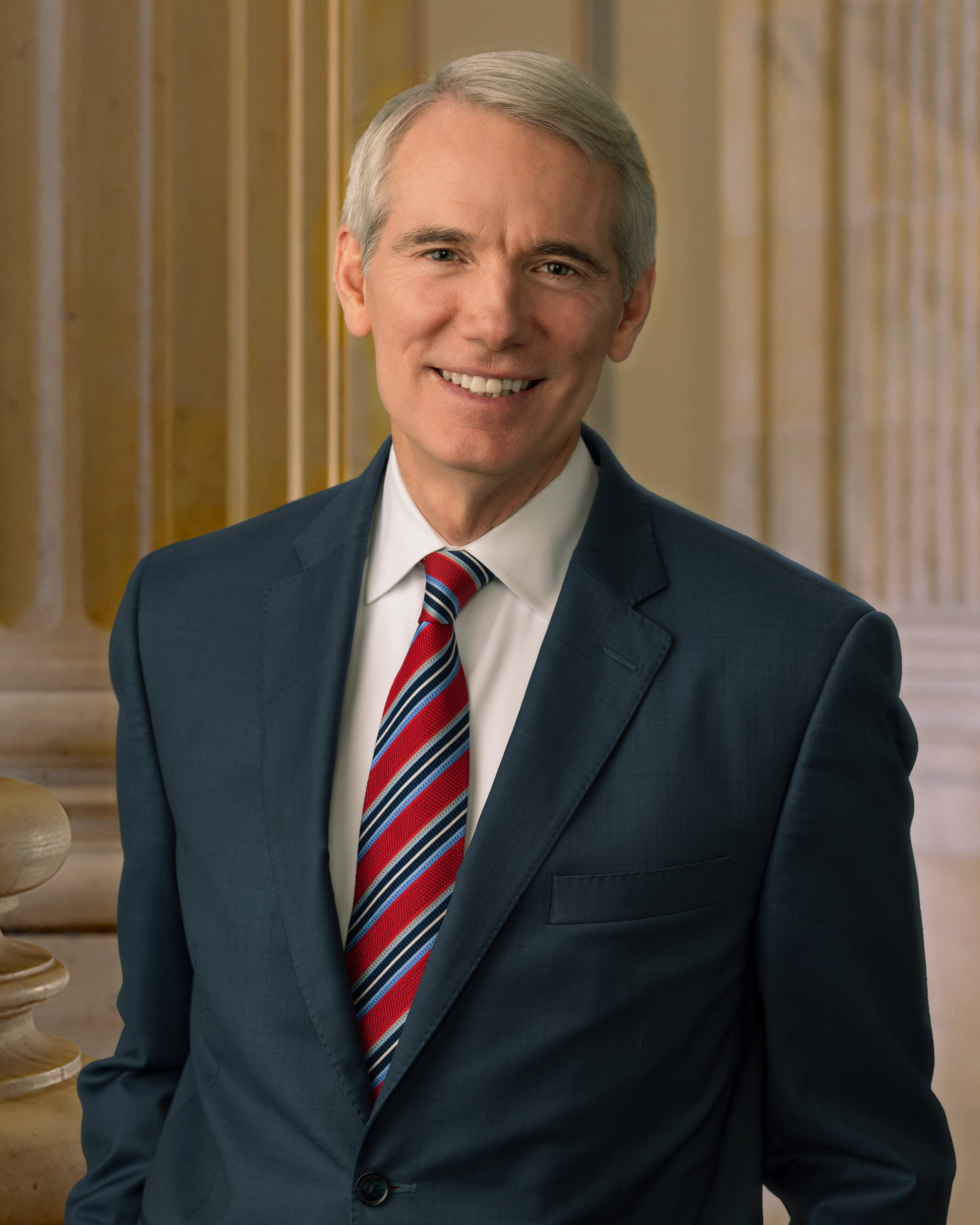
Rob Portman

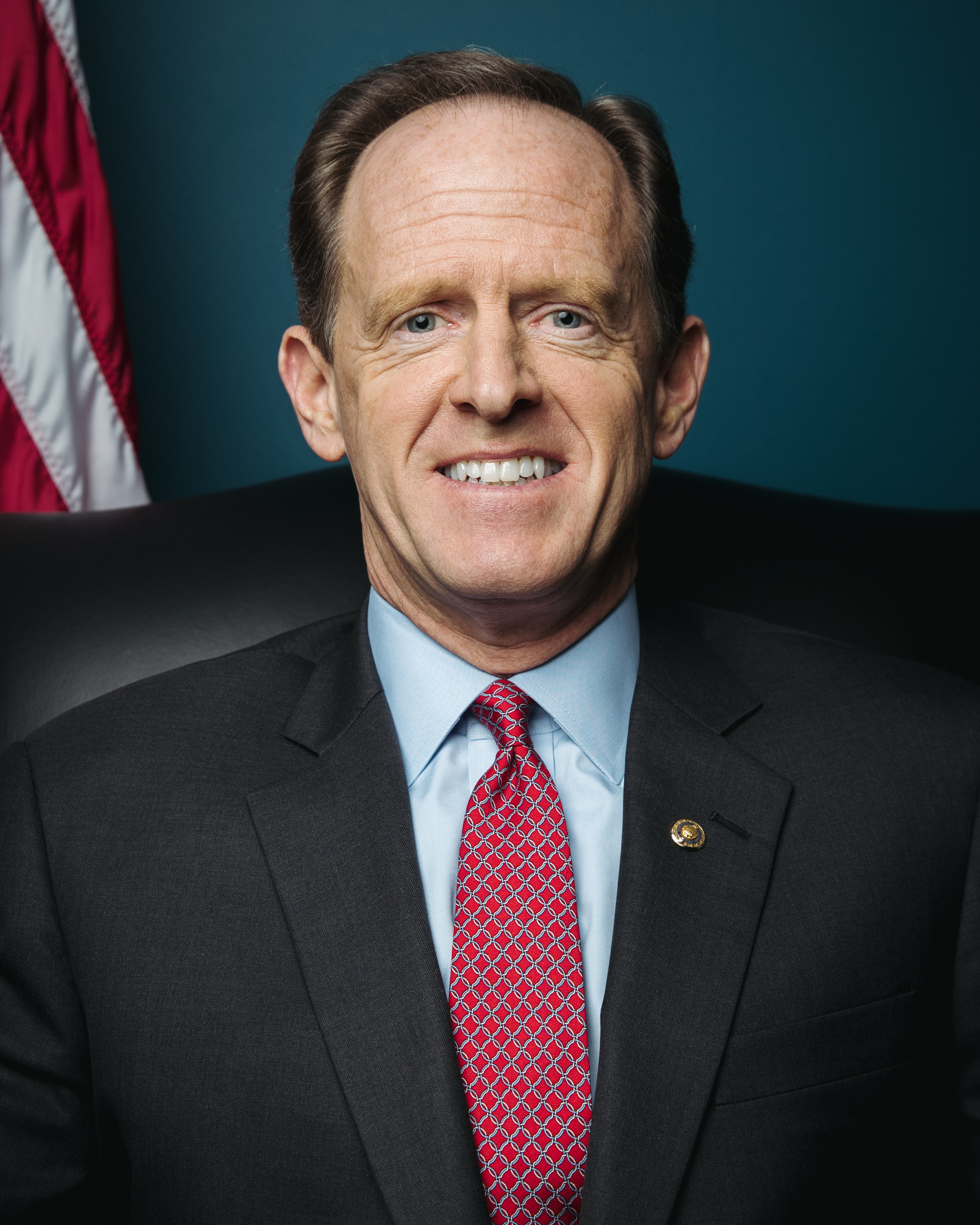
Pat Toomey

- Rudy Boschwitz, U.S. senator from Minnesota (1978–1991), U.S. ambassador to the United Nations Commission on Human Rights (2005–2006) (endorsed Nikki Haley)
- Jeffrey Chiesa, U.S. senator from New Jersey (2013), attorney general of New Jersey (2012–2013) (endorsed Chris Christie)
- Bob Corker, U.S. senator from Tennessee (2007–2019), mayor of Chattanooga (2001–2005)
- Jeff Flake, ambassador to Turkey (2022–2024), U.S. senator from Arizona (2013–2019), U.S. representative from AZ (2001–2013) (endorsed Kamala Harris)
- Judd Gregg, U.S. senator from New Hampshire (1993–2011), governor of New Hampshire (1989–1993) (endorsed Nikki Haley)
- Gordon J. Humphrey, U.S. senator from New Hampshire (1979–1990) (Independent since 2016) (endorsed Kamala Harris)
- Nancy Kassebaum, U.S. senator from Kansas (1978–1997) (endorsed Kamala Harris)
- George LeMieux, U.S. senator from Florida (2009–2011) (endorsed Ron DeSantis)
- Mack Mattingly, U.S. senator from Georgia (1981–1987), U.S. ambassador to Seychelles (1992–1993), chair of the Georgia Republican Party (1975–1977)
- Rob Portman, U.S. senator from Ohio (2011–2023), director of the Office of Management and Budget (2006–2007), U.S. trade representative (2005–2006), U.S. representative from OH-02 (1993–2005), White House director of legislative affairs (1989–1991) (endorsed Nikki Haley)
- Mitt Romney, U.S. senator from Utah (2019-2025), 2012 nominee for president, chair of the Republican Governors Association (2005–2006), governor of Massachusetts (2003–2007) (did not vote for Trump in general election)
- Alan Simpson, U.S. senator from Wyoming (1979–1997)
- John E. Sununu, U.S. senator from New Hampshire (2003–2009), U.S. representative from NH-01 (1997–2003) (endorsed Nikki Haley)
- Pat Toomey, U.S. senator from Pennsylvania (2011–2023), U.S. representative from PA-15 (1999–2005) (did not vote for Trump in general election)

== U.S. representatives ==
=== Current ===
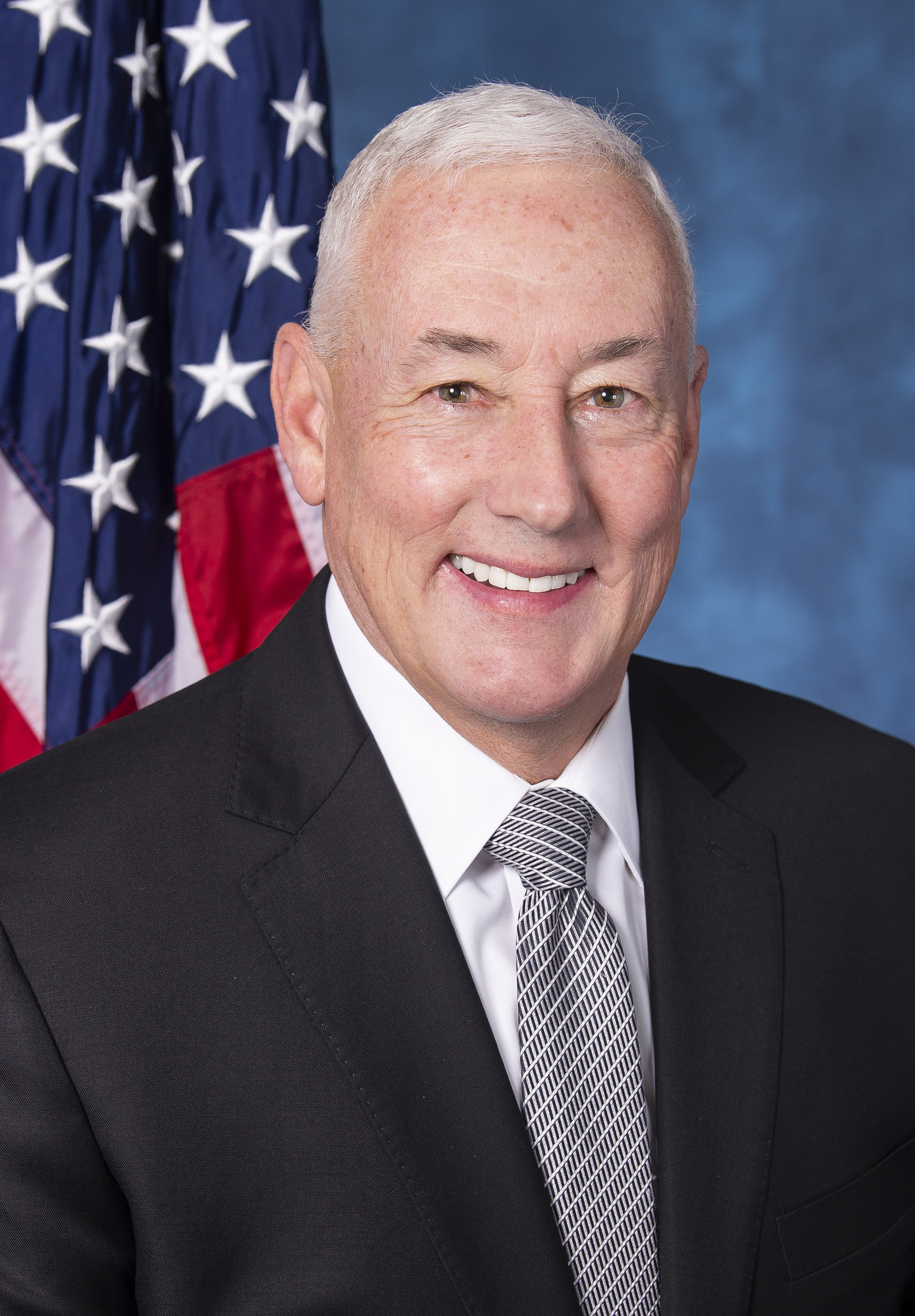
Greg Pence

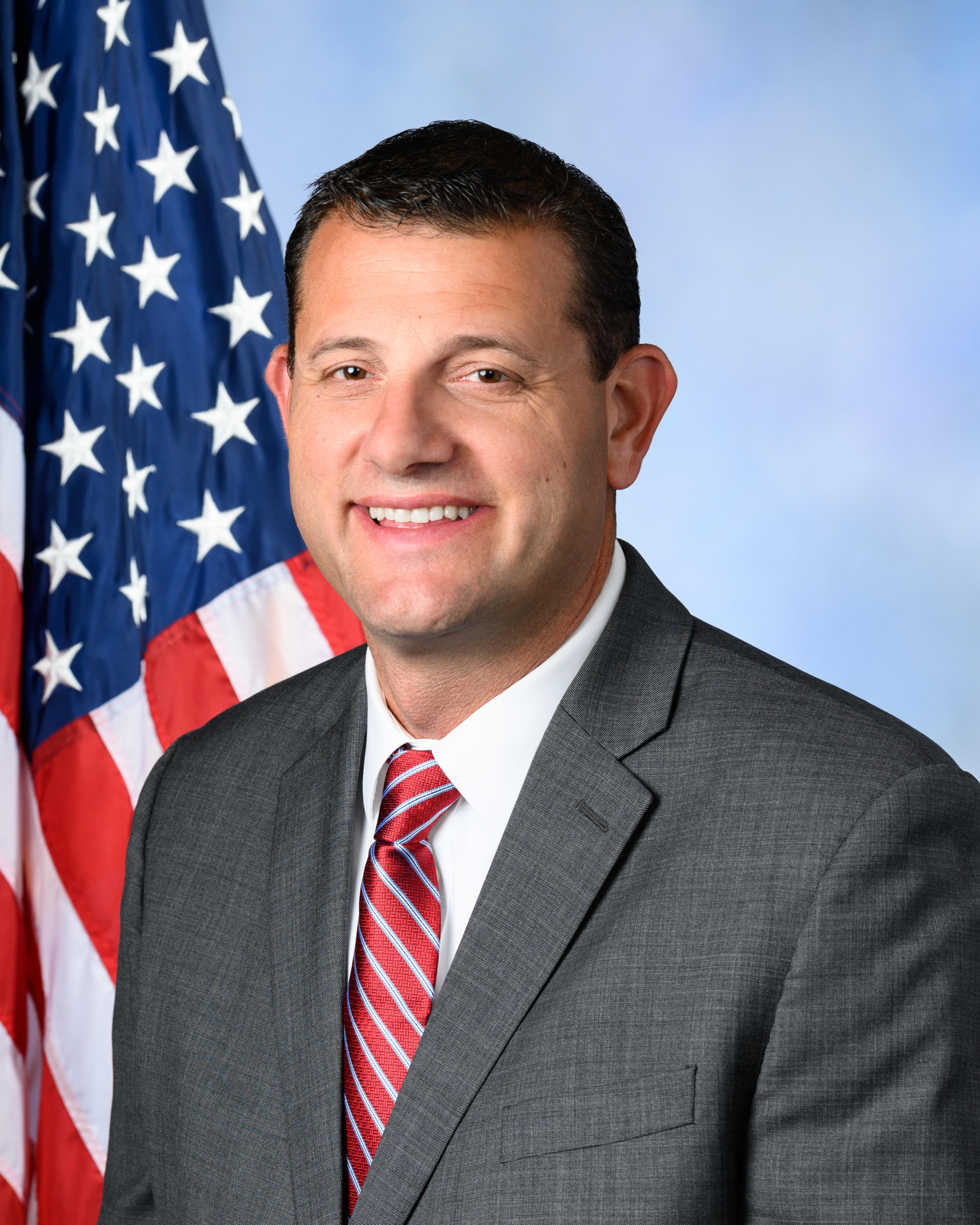
David Valadao

- Greg Pence, U.S. representative from IN-06 (2019–2025) (endorsed Mike Pence, his brother)
- David Valadao, U.S. representative from CA-22 (2023–present), U.S. representative from CA-21 (2013–2019, 2021–2023) (did not vote for Trump in general election)

=== Former ===
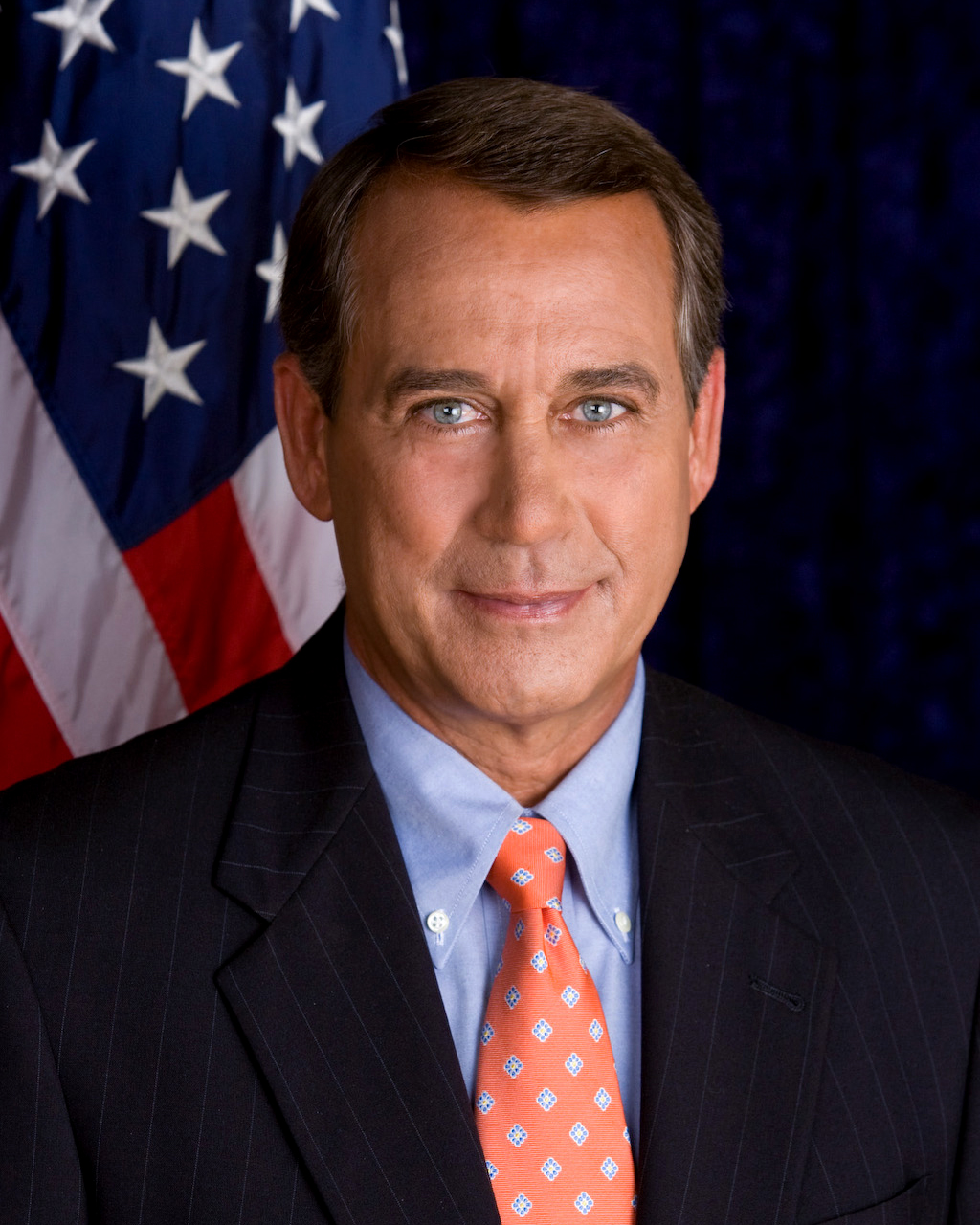
John Boehner

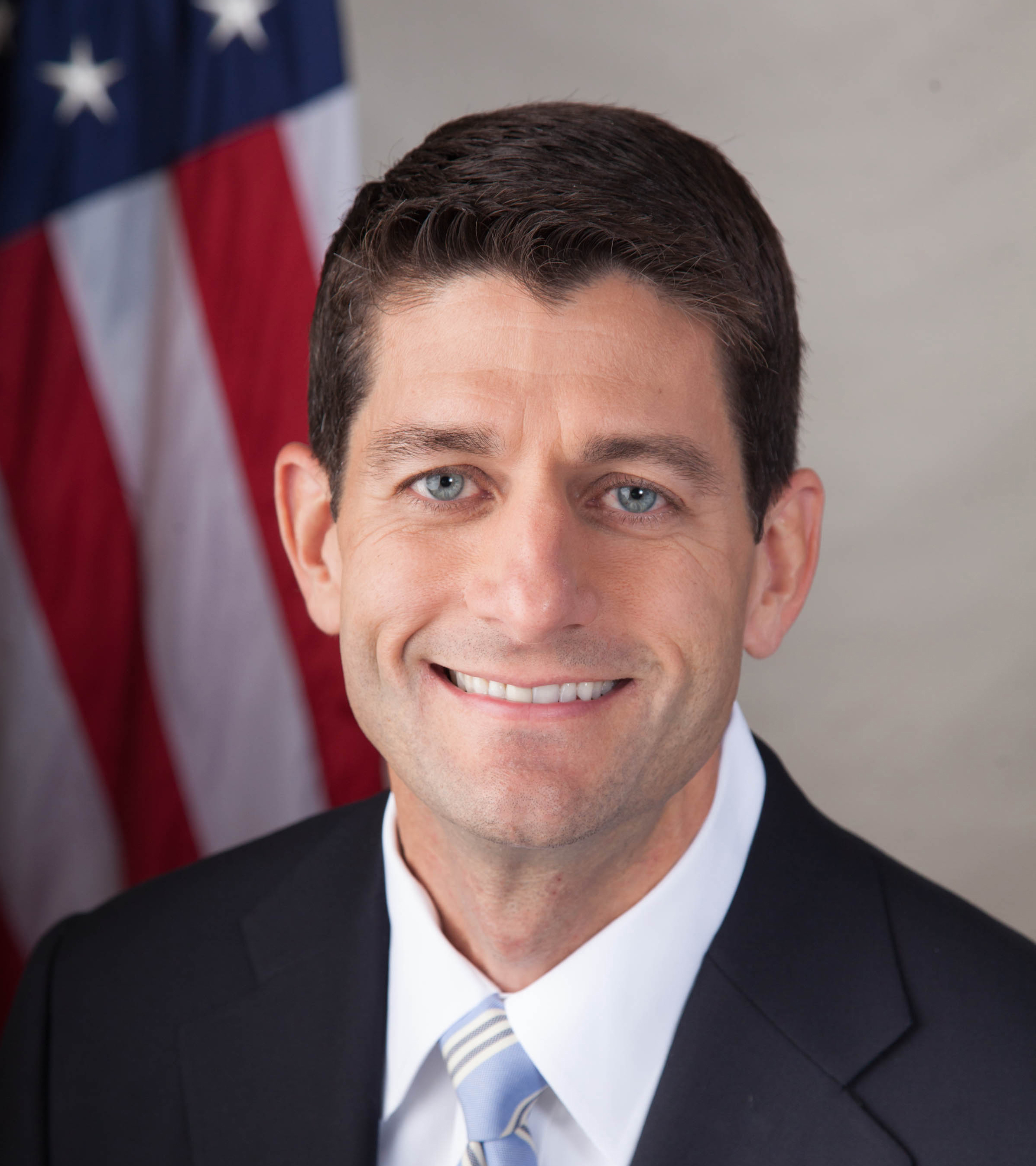
Paul Ryan

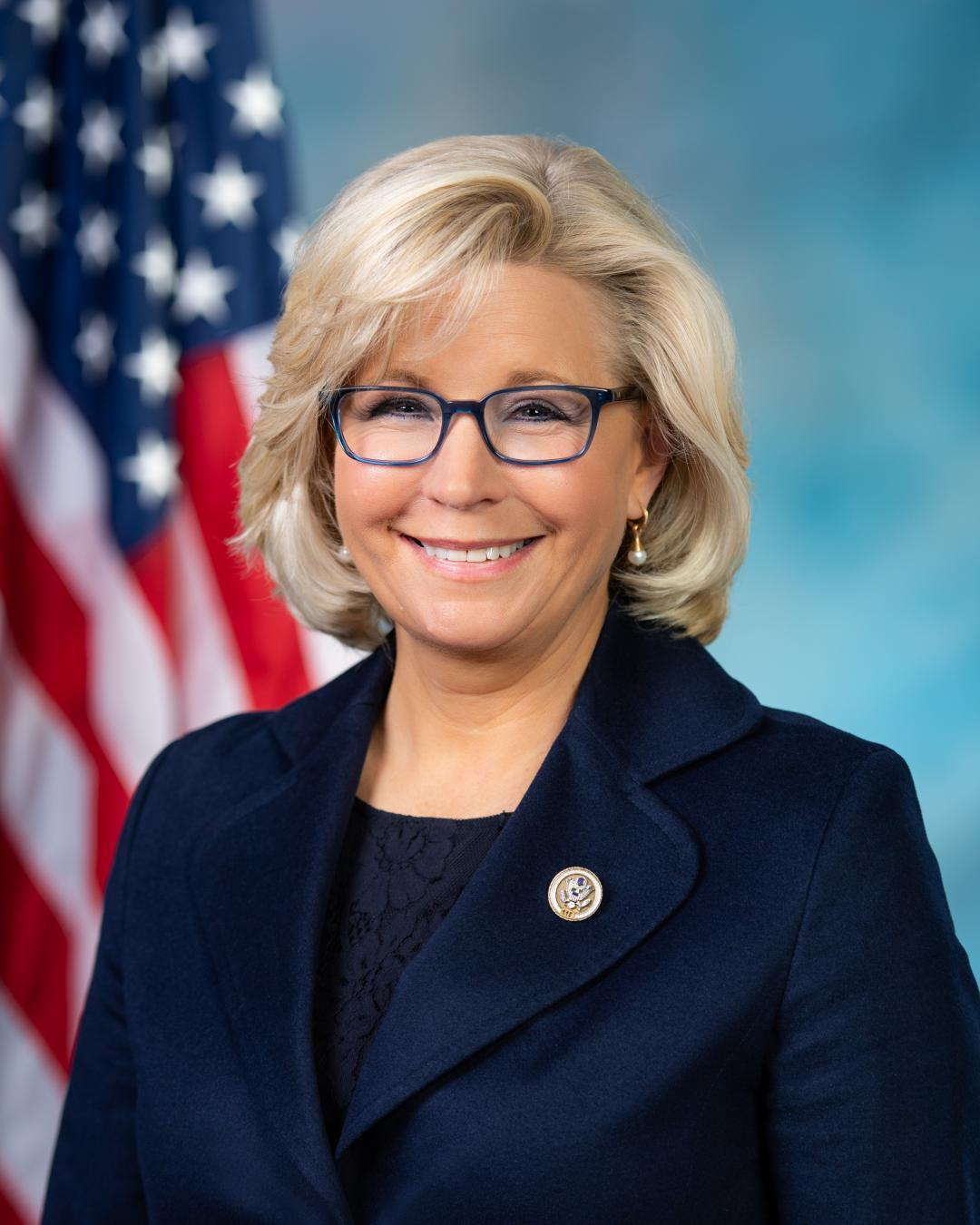
Liz Cheney

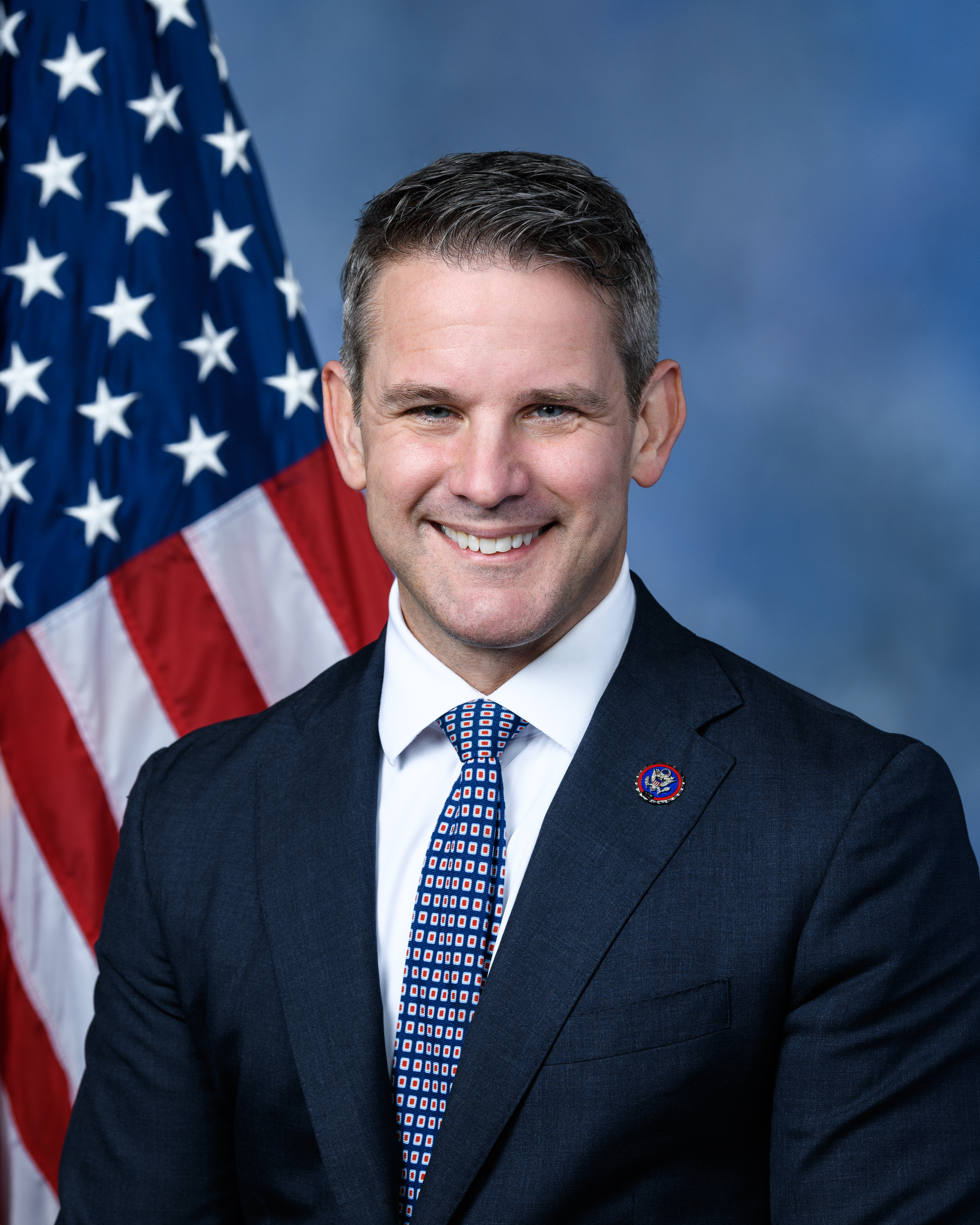
Adam Kinzinger

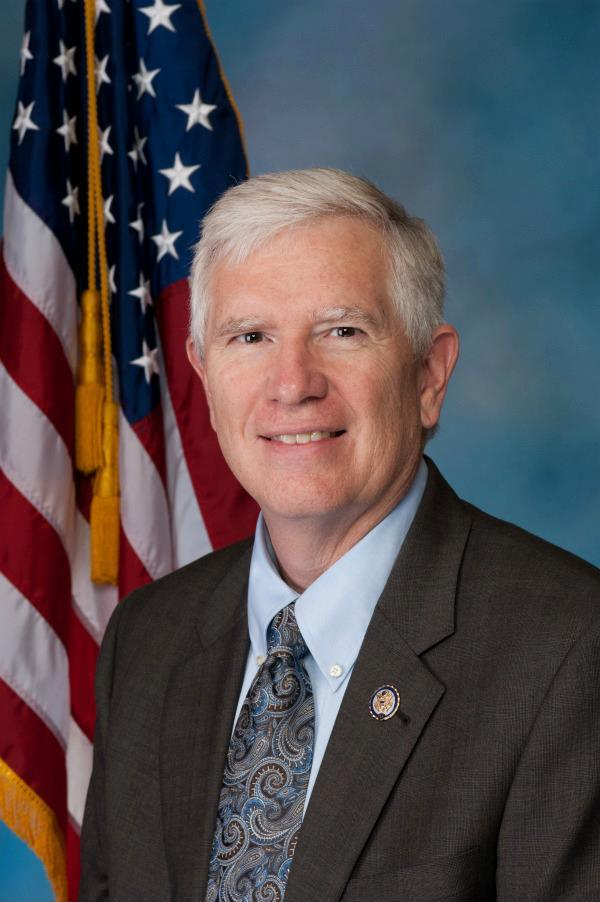
Mo Brooks

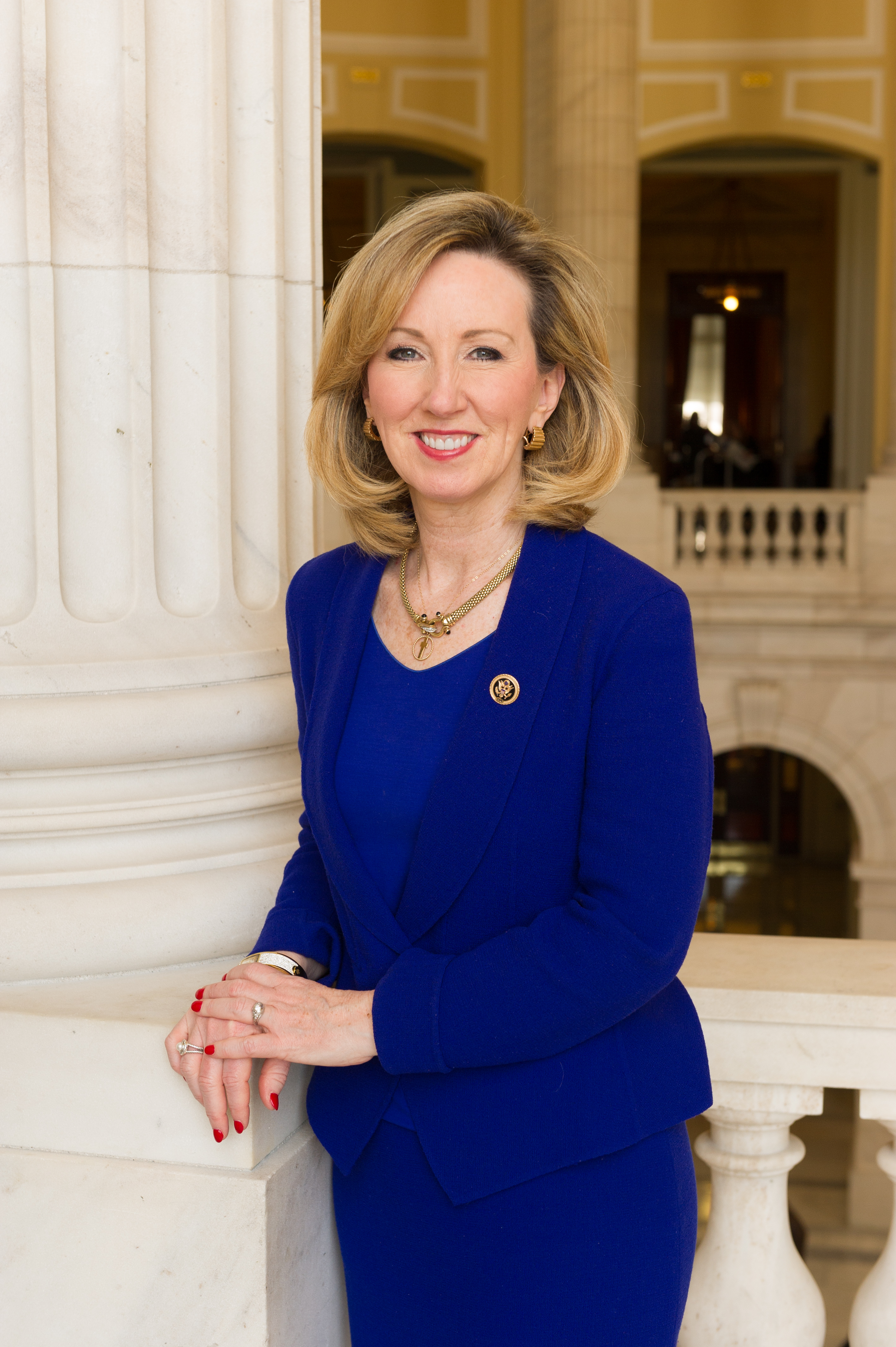
Barbara Comstock

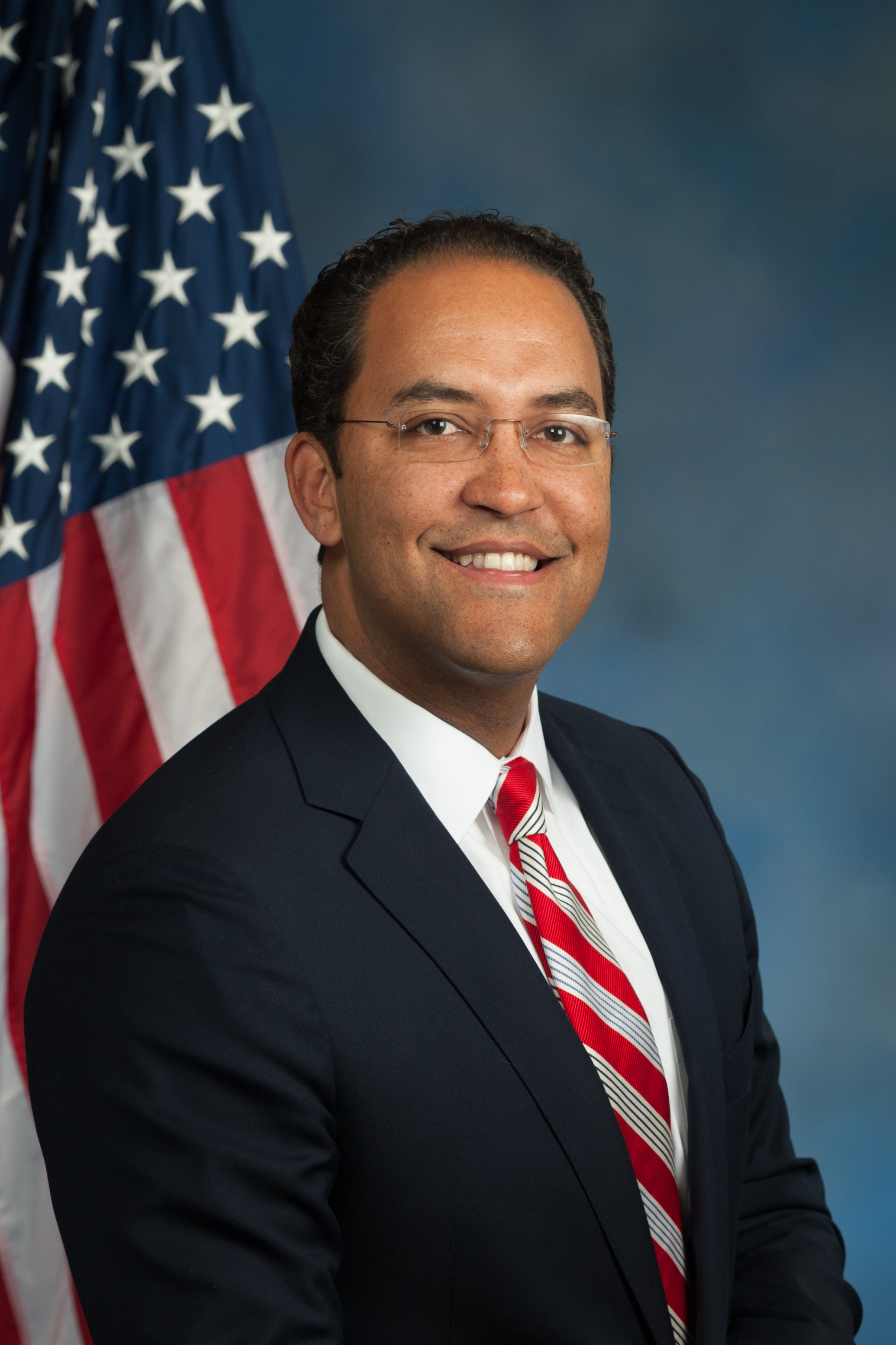
Will Hurd

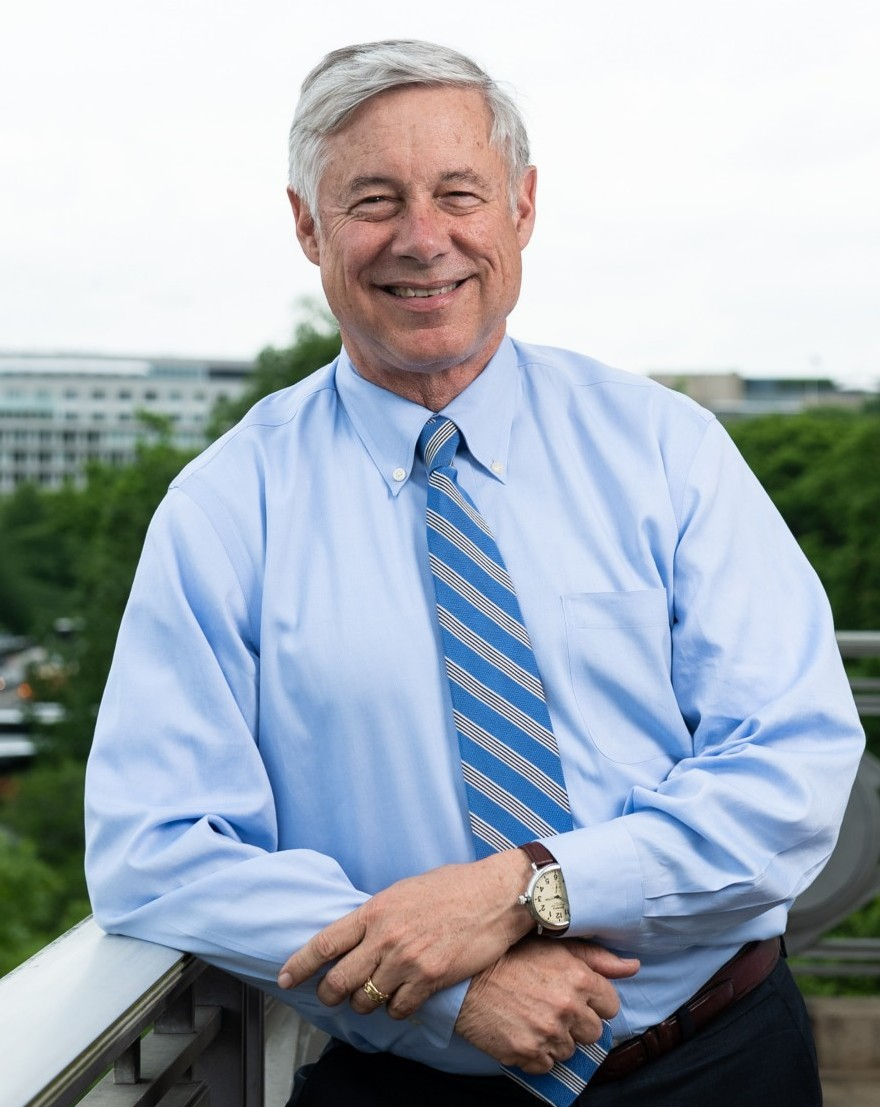
Fred Upton

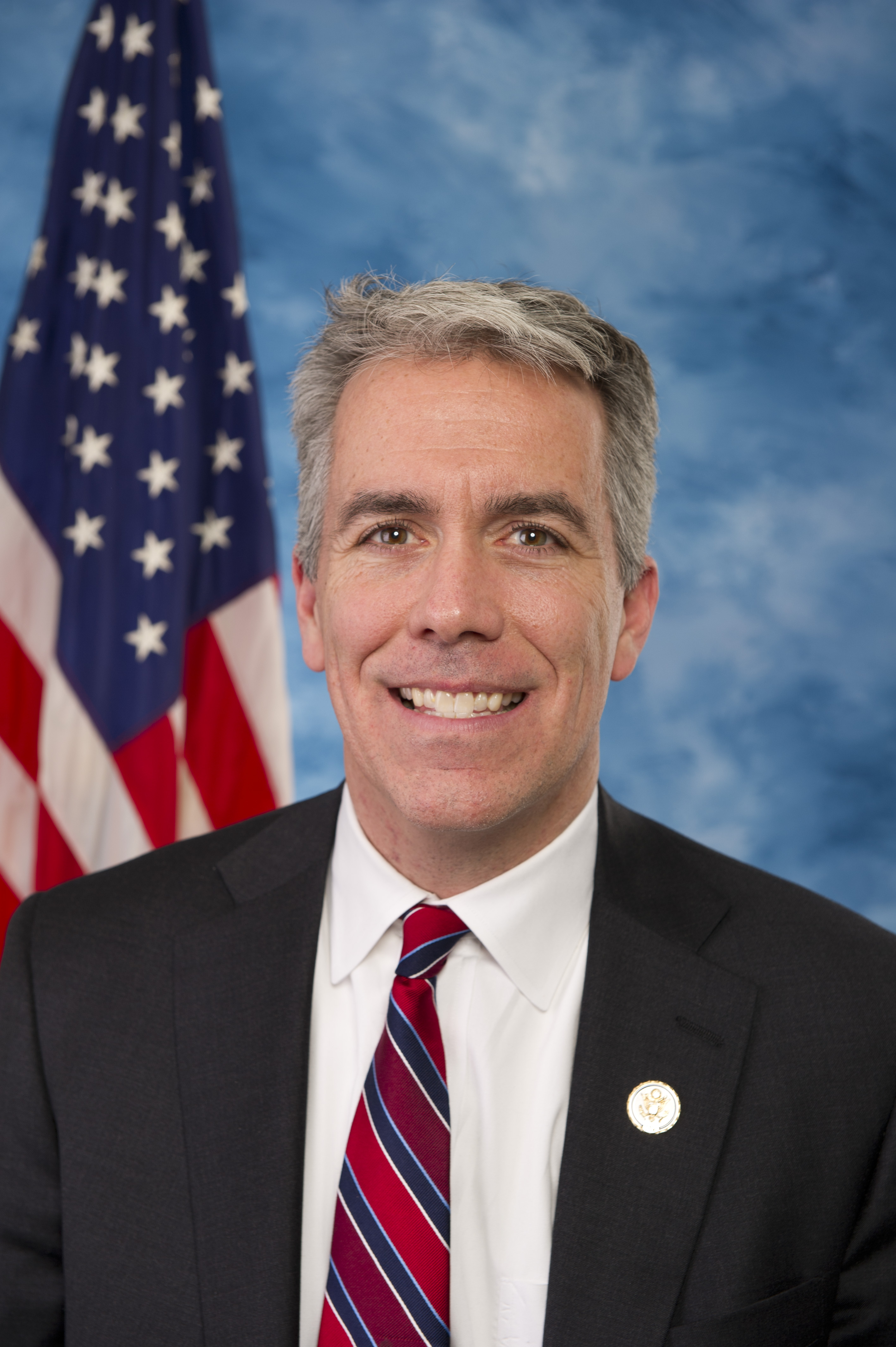
Joe Walsh

- Gresham Barrett, U.S. representative from SC-03 (2003–2011) (endorsed Nikki Haley)
- John Boehner, speaker of the U.S. House of Representatives (2011–2015), U.S. representative from OH-08 (1991–2015)
- Charles Boustany, U.S. representative from LA-07 (2005–2013) and LA-03 (2013–2017) (endorsed Kamala Harris)
- Mo Brooks, U.S. representative from AL-05 (2011–2023), Madison County commissioner (1996–2011)
- Susan Brooks, U.S. representative from IN-05 (2013–2021) (endorsed Chris Christie)
- Ken Buck, CO-04 (2015–2024), chair of the Colorado Republican Party (2019–2021)
- Rod Chandler, WA-08 (1983–1993), member of the Washington House of Representatives from the 45th district (1975–1983) (endorsed Kamala Harris)
- Liz Cheney, U.S. representative from WY-AL (2017–2023), chair of the House Republican Conference (2019–2021) (endorsed Kamala Harris)
- Tom Coleman, MO-06 (1976–1993), member of the Missouri House of Representatives from the 21st district (1973–1976) (endorsed Kamala Harris)
- Barbara Comstock, U.S. representative from VA-10 (2015–2019) (endorsed Kamala Harris)
- Tom DeLay, U.S. representative from TX-22 (1985–2006) (endorsed Randall Terry)
- Charlie Dent, U.S. representative from PA-15 (2005–2018) (endorsed Kamala Harris)
- Charles Djou, U.S. representative from HI-01 (2010–2011) (endorsed Kamala Harris)
- Chuck Douglas, U.S. representative from NH-02 (1989–1991), justice of the New Hampshire Supreme Court (1974–1985) (endorsed Kamala Harris)
- Mickey Edwards, U.S. representative from OK-05 (1977–1993), chair of the House Republican Policy Committee (1989–1993) (endorsed Kamala Harris)
- David Emery, U.S. representative from ME-01 (1975–1983) (endorsed Kamala Harris)
- Mike Gallagher, U.S. representative from WI-08 (2017–2024)
- Wayne Gilchrest, MD-01 (1991–2009) (endorsed Kamala Harris)
- Anthony Gonzalez, U.S. representative from OH-16 (2019–2023)
- Jim Greenwood, PA-08 (1993–2005), member of the Pennsylvania House of Representatives from the 143rd district (1981–1986), member of the Pennsylvania Senate from the 10th district (1987–1993) (endorsed Kamala Harris)
- Will Hurd, U.S. representative from TX-23 (2015–2021) (former candidate for president, endorsed Haley) (did not vote for Trump in general election)
- Bob Inglis, six-term U.S. representative from SC-04 (1993–1999, 2005–2011) (endorsed Kamala Harris)
- David Jolly, U.S. representative from FL-13 (2014–2017) (Forward, Republican until 2018) (endorsed Kamala Harris)
- John Katko, U.S. representative from NY-24 (2015–2023)
- Adam Kinzinger, U.S. representative from IL-16 (2013–2023), U.S. representative from IL-11 (2011–2013) (endorsed Kamala Harris)
- John LeBoutillier, NY-06 (1981–1983) (endorsed Kamala Harris)
- Dan Miller, U.S. representative from FL-13 (1993–2003) (endorsed Kamala Harris)
- Susan Molinari, NY-13 (1993–1997), NY-14 (1991–1993), vice chair of the House Republican Conference (1995–1997), member of the New York City Council from the 1st district (1986–1990) (endorsed Kamala Harris)
- Bill Paxon, U.S. representative from NY-31 (1989–1993) and NY-27 (1993–1999) (endorsed Kamala Harris)
- Jack Quinn, NY-30 (1993–2005) (endorsed Kamala Harris)
- Dave Reichert, WA-08 (2005–2019) (did not vote for Trump in general election)
- Tom Rice, U.S. representative from SC-07 (2013–2023)
- Denver Riggleman, VA-05 (2019–2021) (independent since 2022, endorsed Kamala Harris)
- Paul Ryan, speaker of the U.S. House of Representatives (2015–2019), U.S. representative from WI-01 (1999–2019), 2012 nominee for vice president (did not vote for Trump in general election)
- Joe Scarborough, U.S. representative from FL-01 (1995–2001), host of Morning Joe (independent since 2017) (endorsed Kamala Harris)
- Claudine Schneider, RI-02 (1981–1991) (endorsed Kamala Harris)
- Chris Shays, CT-4 (1987–2009) (endorsed Kamala Harris)
- Peter Smith, VT-AL (1989–1991), lt. governor of Vermont (1983–1987) (endorsed Kamala Harris)
- Alan Steelman, TX-05 (1973–1977) (endorsed Kamala Harris)
- David Trott, MI-11 (2015–2019) (endorsed Kamala Harris)
- Fred Upton, MI-06 (1993–2023), MI-04 (1987–1993) (endorsed Kamala Harris)
- Joe Walsh, U.S. representative from IL-08 (2011–2013), candidate for president in 2020 (endorsed Kamala Harris)

== State and local officials ==
=== Governors ===
==== Current ====
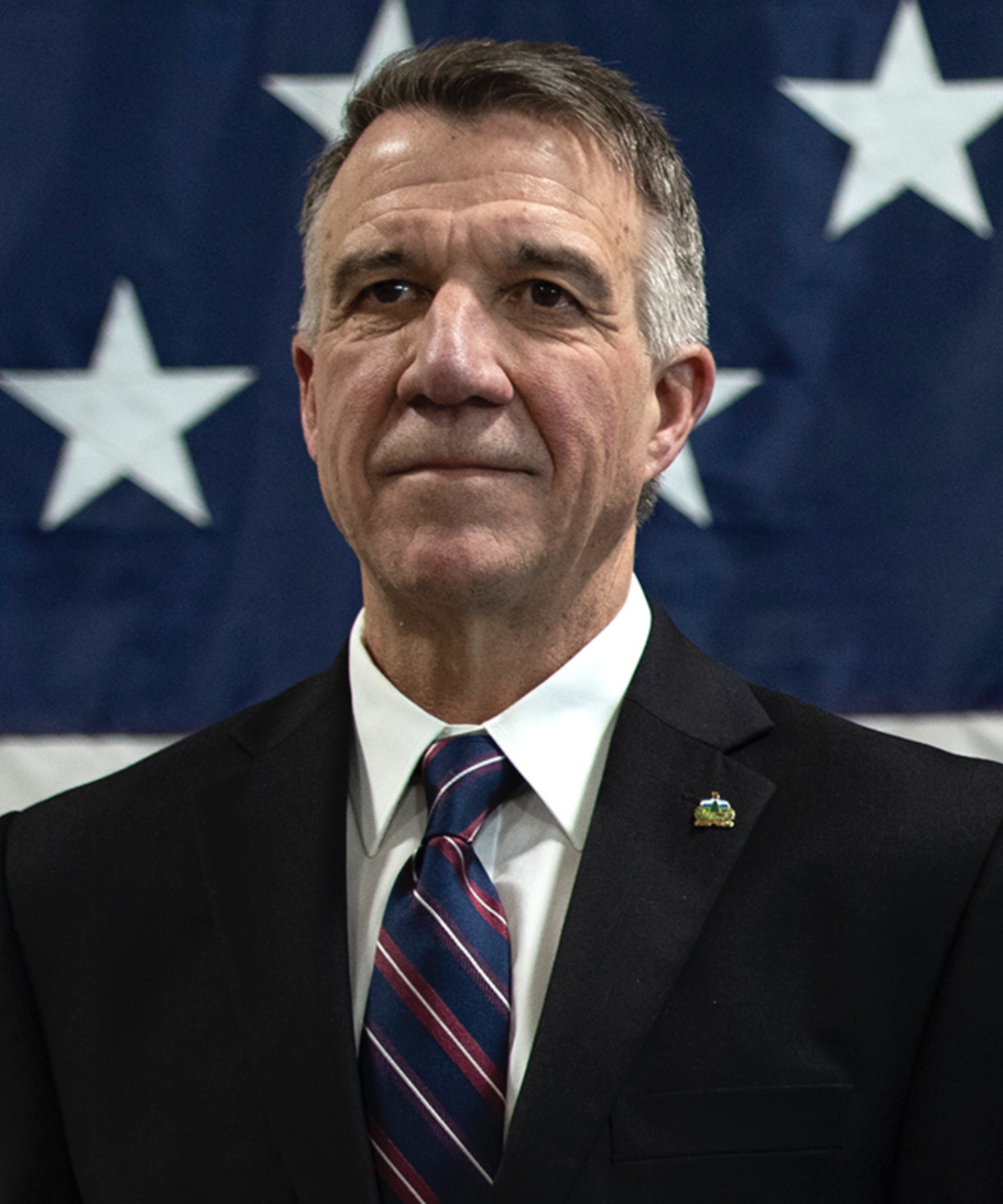
Phil Scott

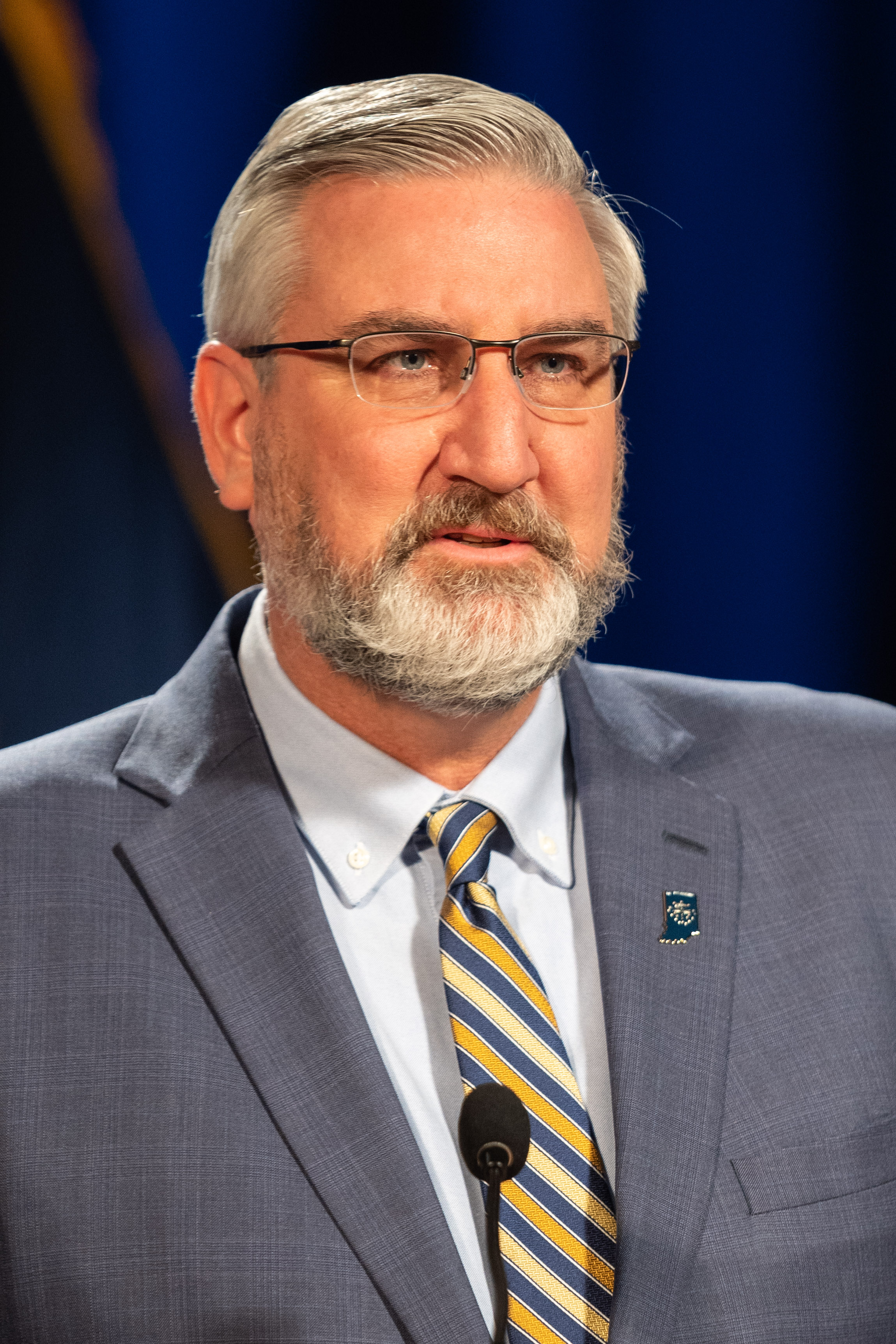
Eric Holcomb

- Eric Holcomb, governor of Indiana (2017–2025), lieutenant governor of Indiana (2016–2017) (endorsed Mike Pence)
- Phil Scott, governor of Vermont (2017–present), lieutenant governor of Vermont (2011–2017) (endorsed Nikki Haley; voted for Kamala Harris in the general election)

==== Former ====
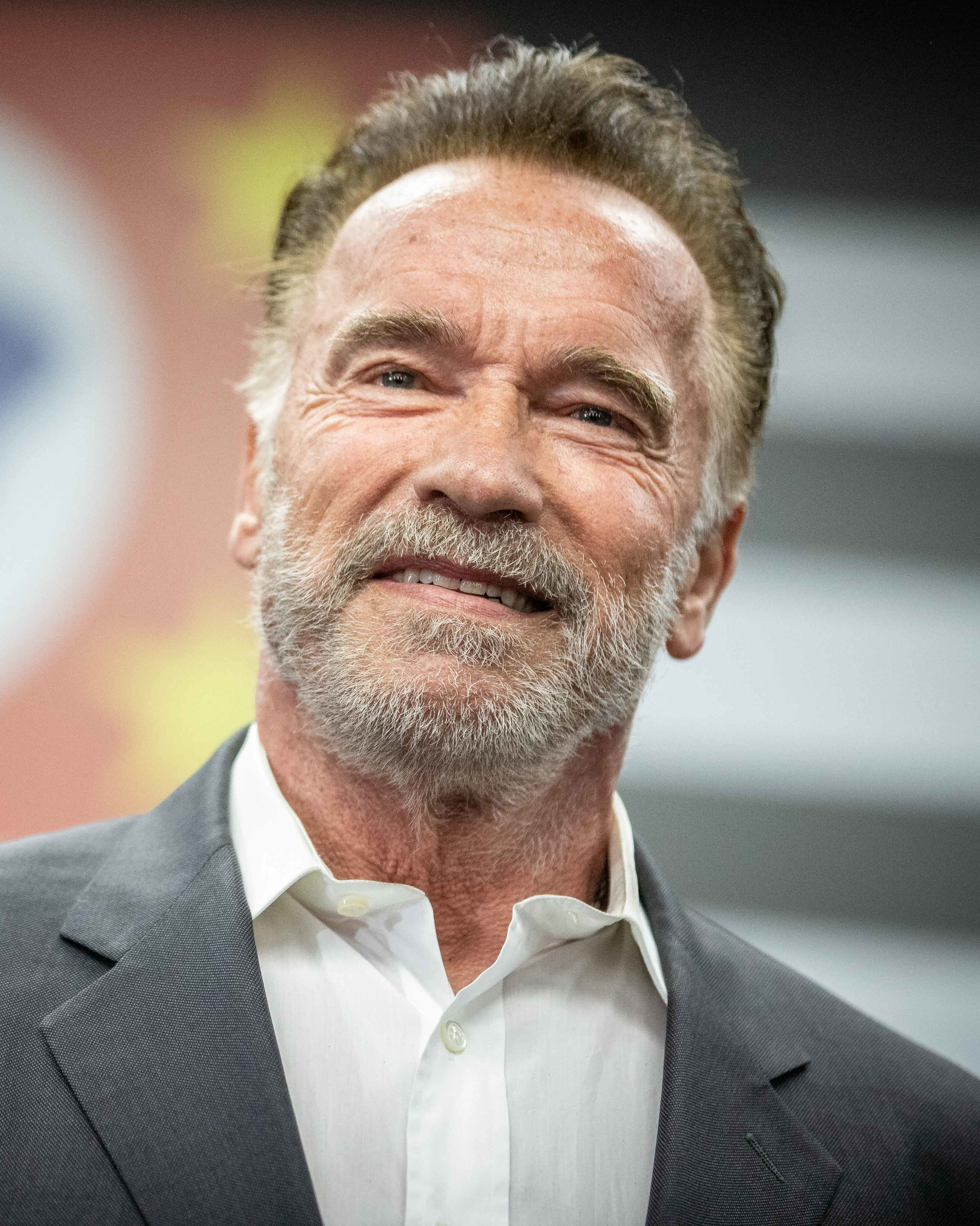
Arnold Schwarzenegger

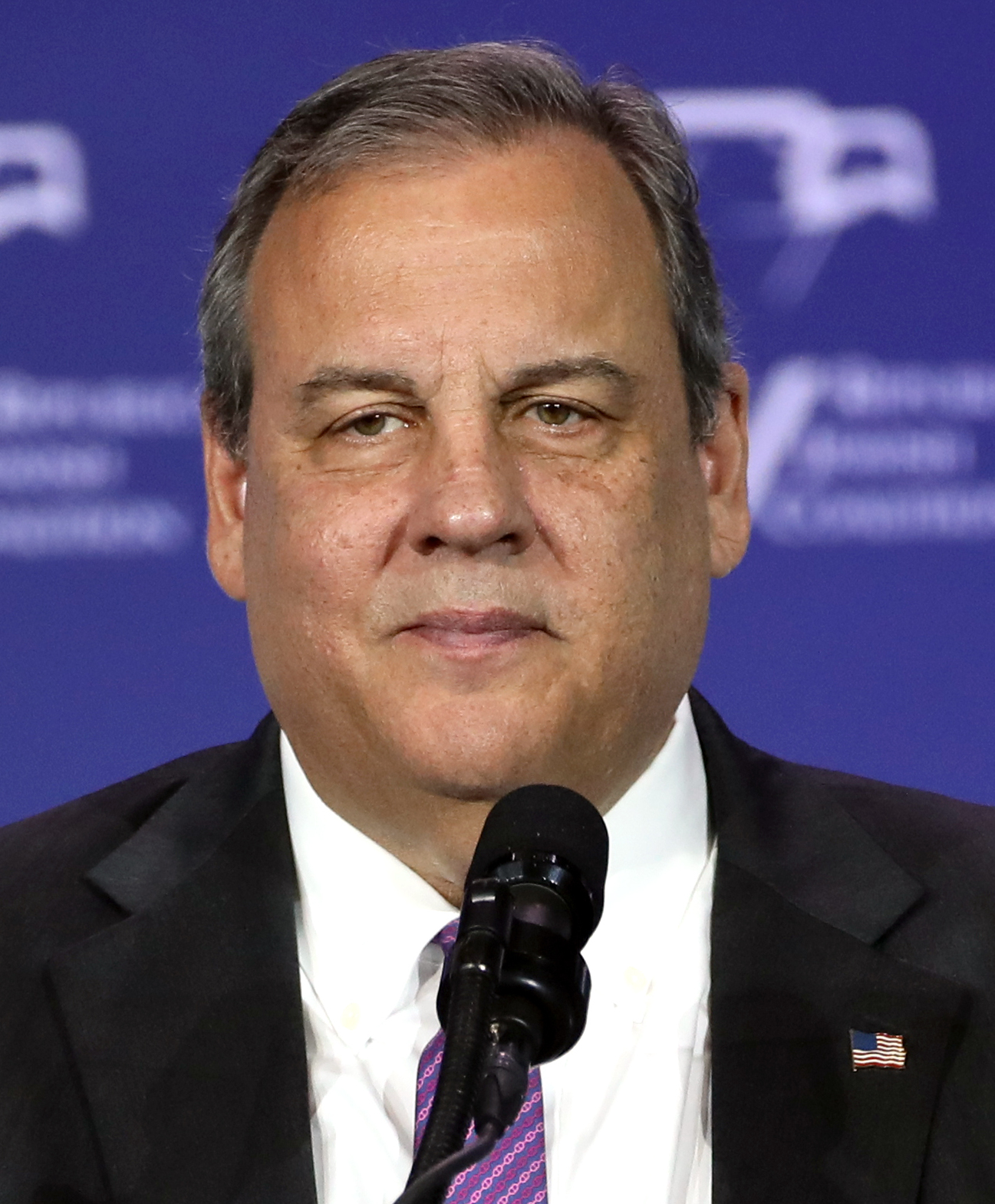
Chris Christie

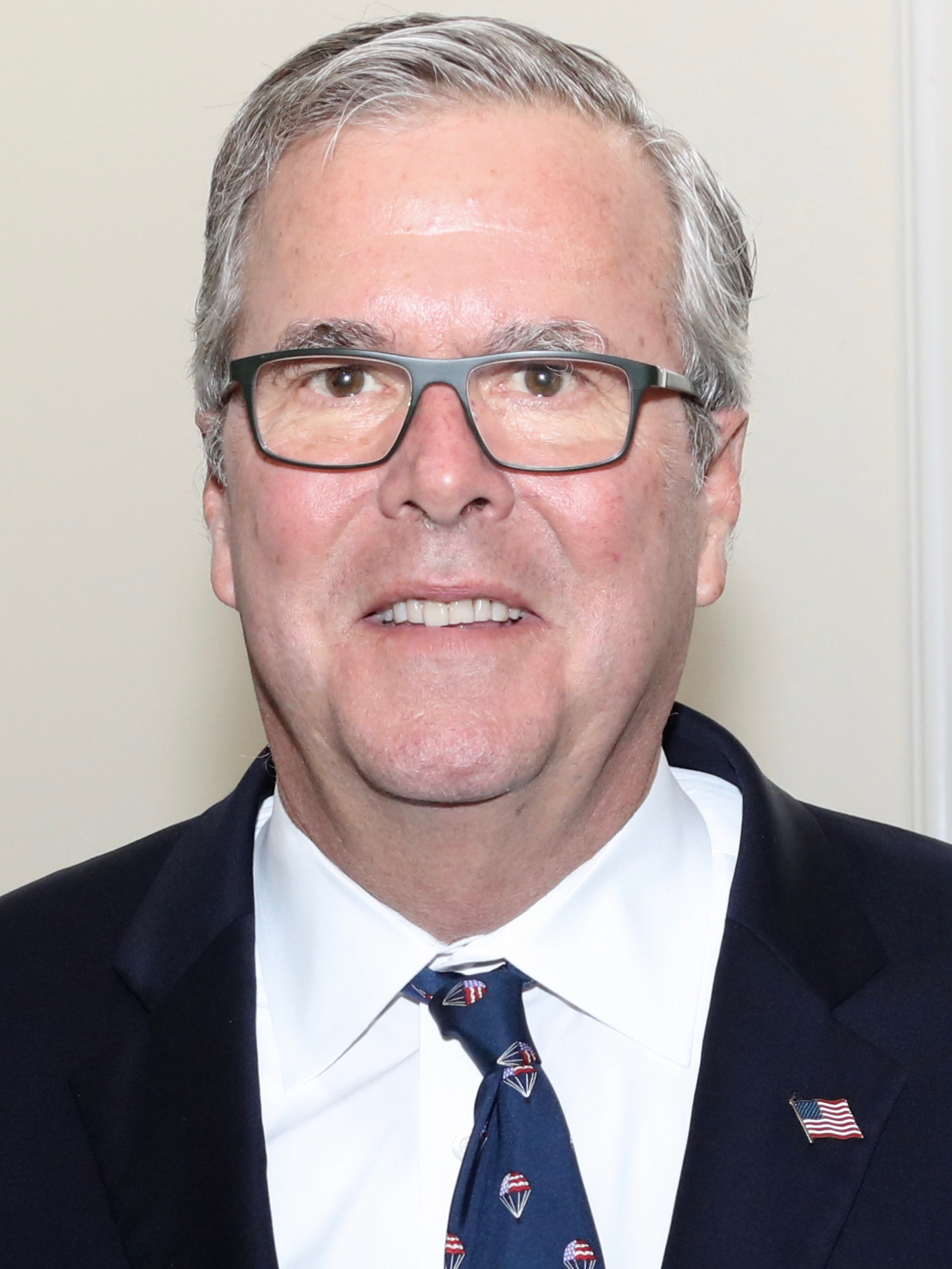
Jeb Bush

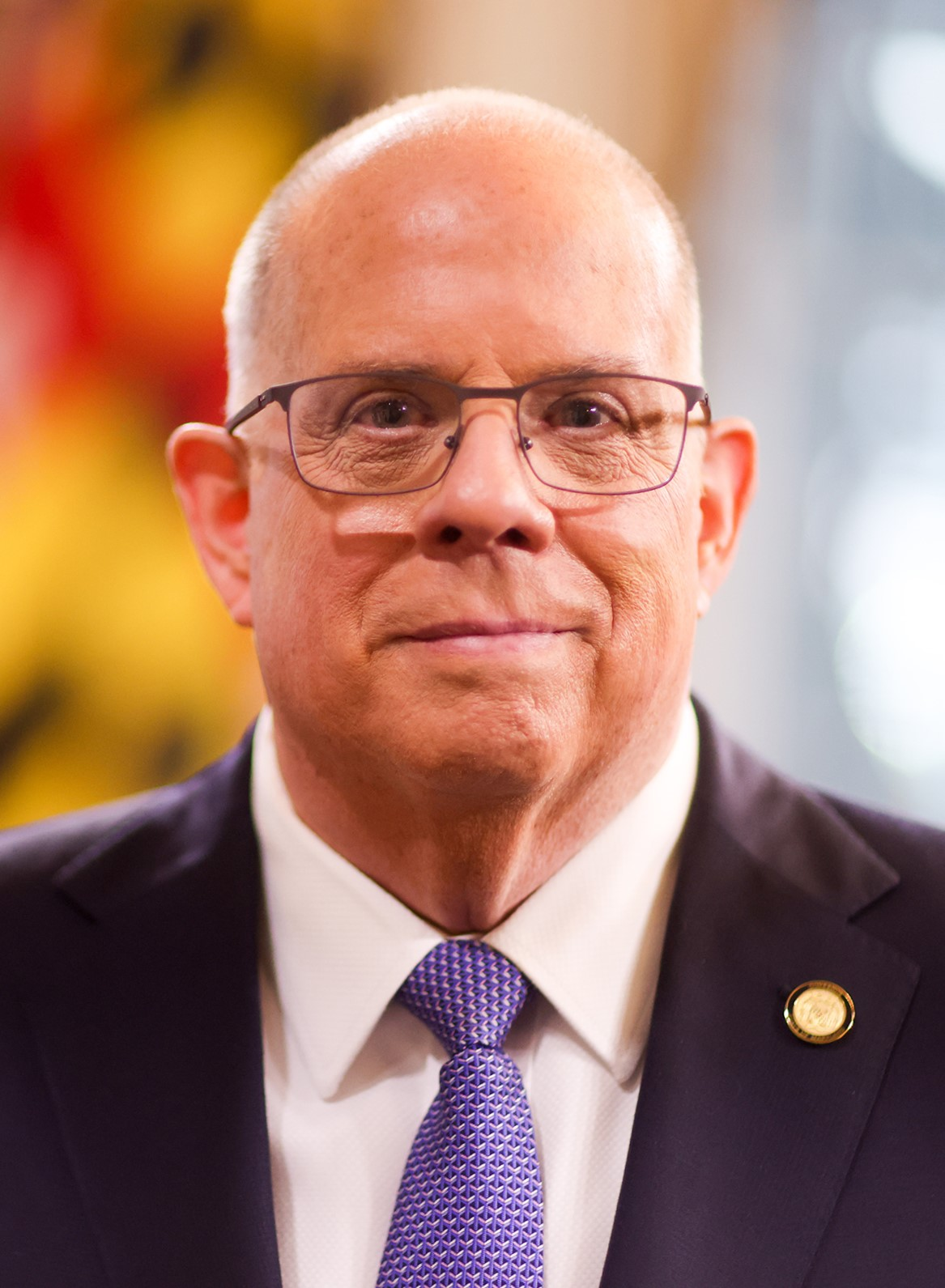
Larry Hogan

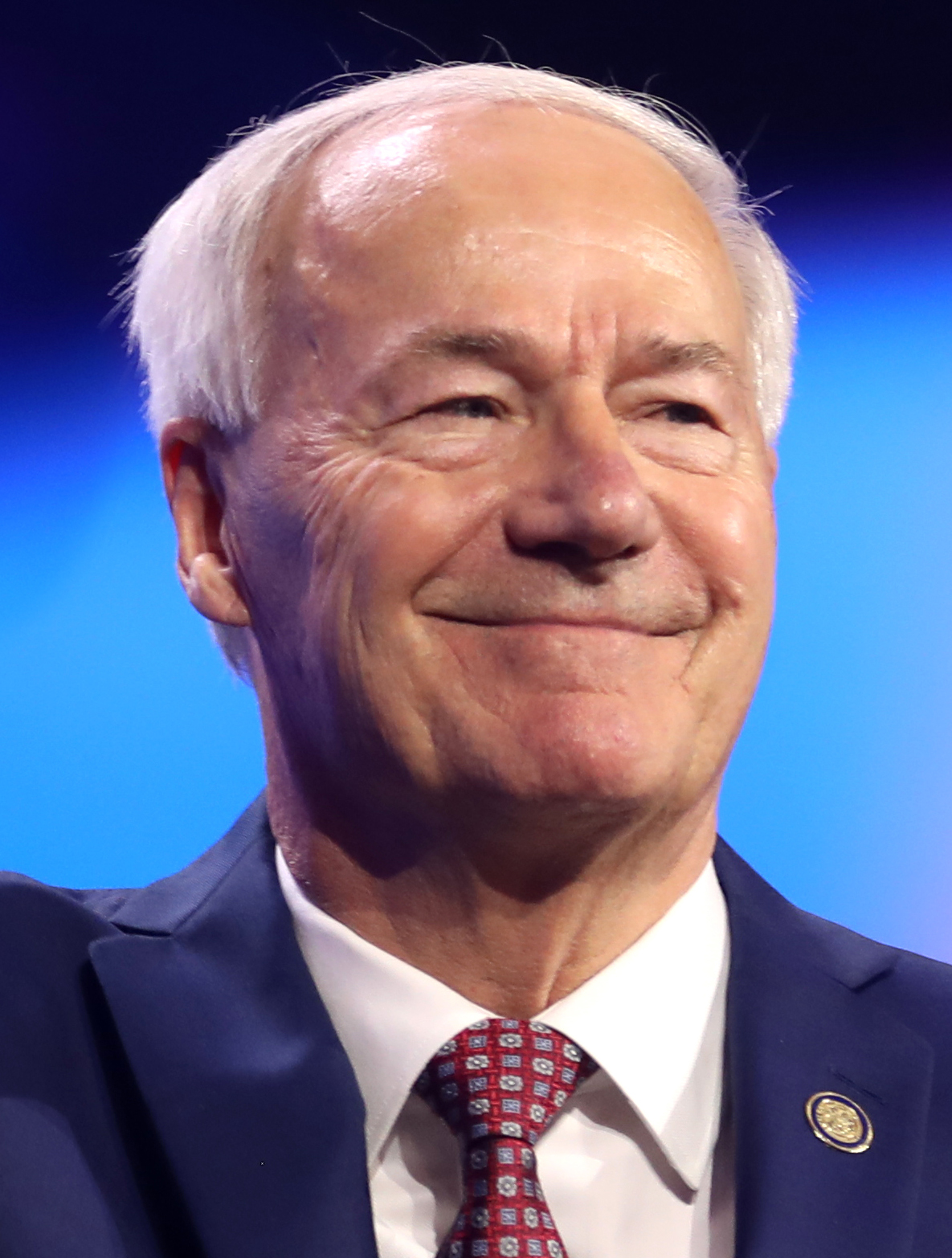
Asa Hutchinson

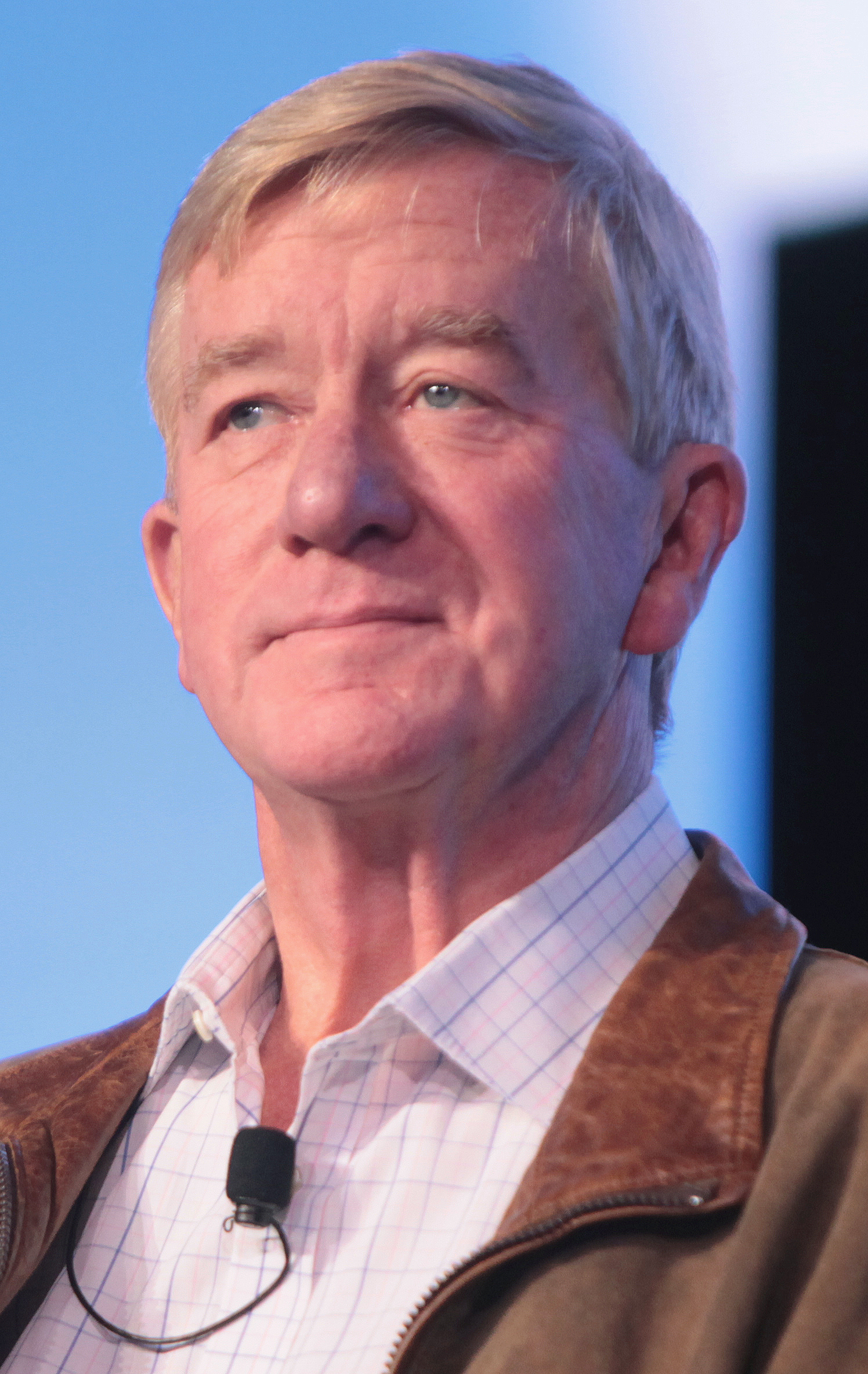
Bill Weld

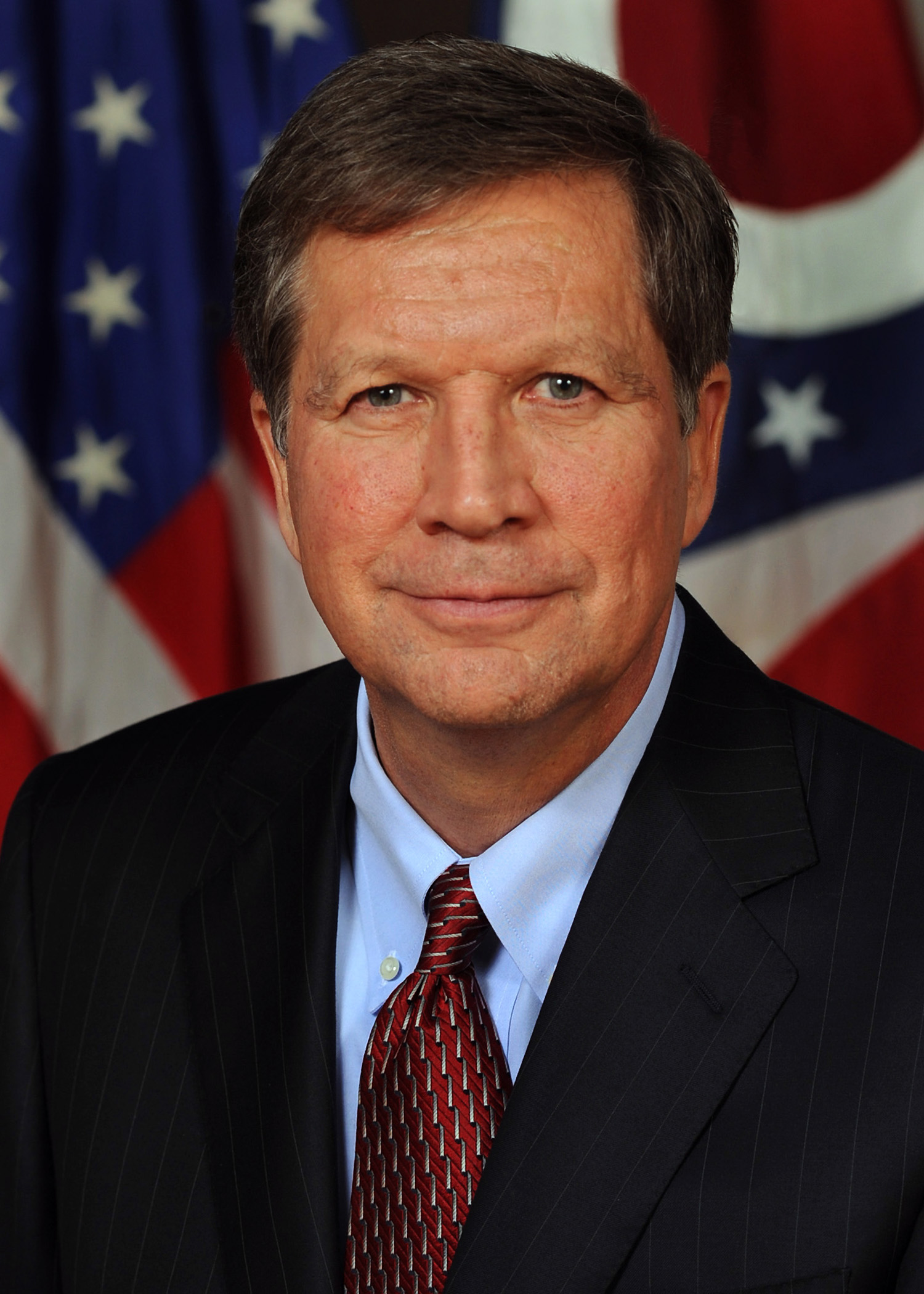
John Kasich

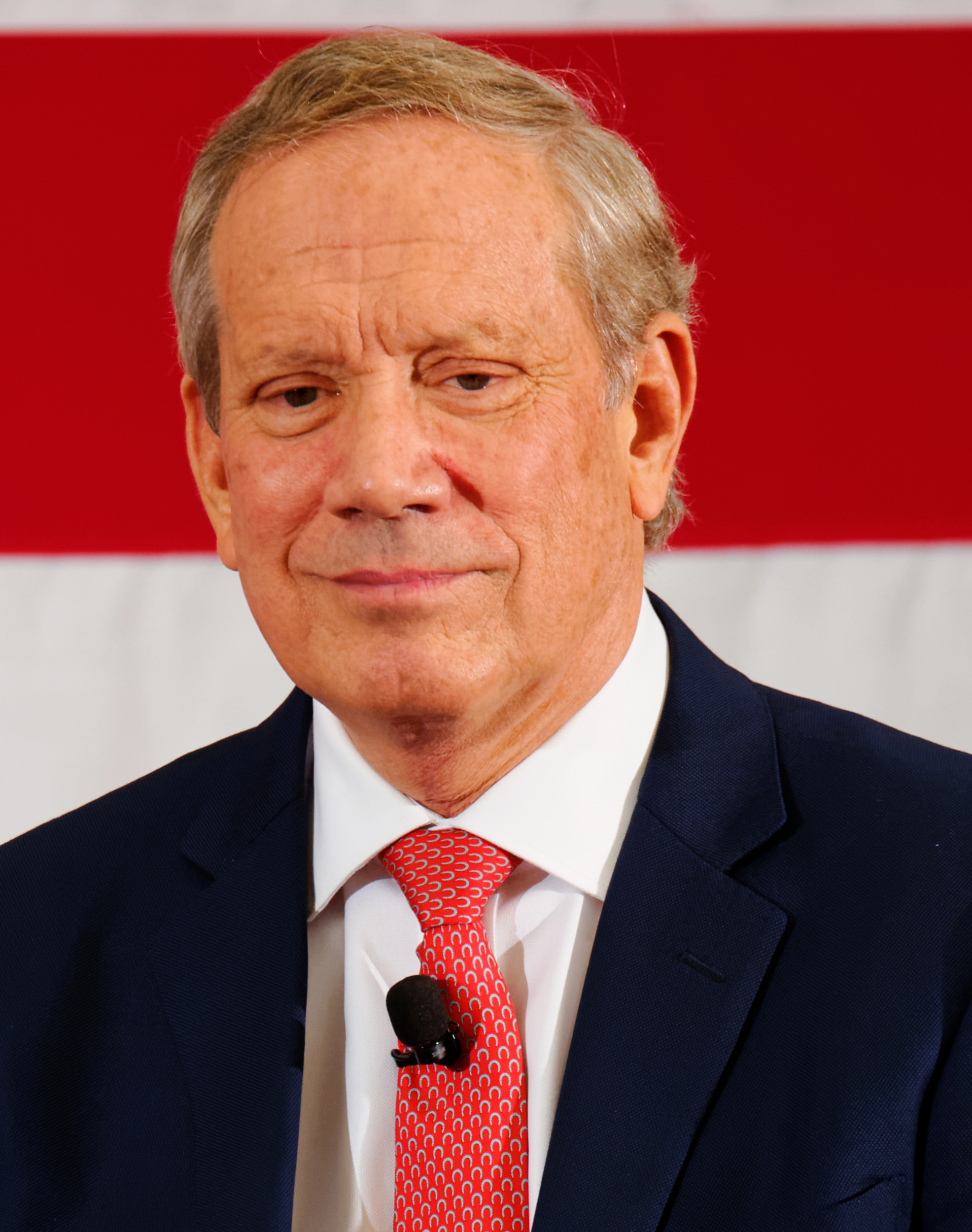
George Pataki

- Charlie Baker, governor of Massachusetts (2015–2023) and president of NCAA (2023–present)
- Jeb Bush, governor of Florida (1999–2007), candidate for president in 2016
- Arne Carlson, governor of Minnesota (1991–1999) (endorsed Kamala Harris)
- Chris Christie, governor of New Jersey (2010–2018), U.S. attorney for the District of New Jersey (2002–2008) (did not vote for Trump in general election)
- Jim Edgar, governor of Illinois (1991–1999) (endorsed Kamala Harris)
- Bill Haslam, governor of Tennessee (2011–2019), chair of the Republican Governors Association (2017–2018) (endorsed Tim Scott)
- Larry Hogan, governor of Maryland (2015–2023), chair of the National Governors Association (2019–2020) (did not vote for Trump in general election)
- Asa Hutchinson, governor of Arkansas (2015–2023), administrator of the Drug Enforcement Administration (2001–2003), U.S. representative from AR-03 (1997–2001) (said he would not vote for Trump in general election)
- John Kasich, governor of Ohio (2011–2019), 2000 and 2016 candidate for president, chair of the U.S. House Budget Committee (1995–2001), U.S. representative from OH-12 (1983–2001) (did not vote for Trump in general election)
- Thomas Kean Sr., governor of New Jersey (1982–1990)
- James G. Martin, governor of North Carolina (1985–1993)
- Pat McCrory, governor of North Carolina (2013–2017)
- George Pataki, governor of New York (1995–2006), candidate for president in 2016
- Marc Racicot, governor of Montana (1993–2001), chair of the RNC (2001–2003)
- Bruce Rauner, governor of Illinois (2015–2019) (endorsed Nikki Haley)
- Mark Sanford, governor of South Carolina (2003–2011), U.S. representative from SC-01 (1995–2001 and 2013–2019), Republican candidate for U.S. president in 2020
- Arnold Schwarzenegger, governor of California (2003–2011), actor (endorsed Kamala Harris)
- Bill Weld, governor of Massachusetts (1991–1997), candidate for president in 2020 (endorsed Kamala Harris)
- Christine Todd Whitman, governor of New Jersey (1994–2001), administrator of the Environmental Protection Agency (2001–2003) (Forward since 2022, endorsed Kamala Harris)

=== Other statewide elected officials ===
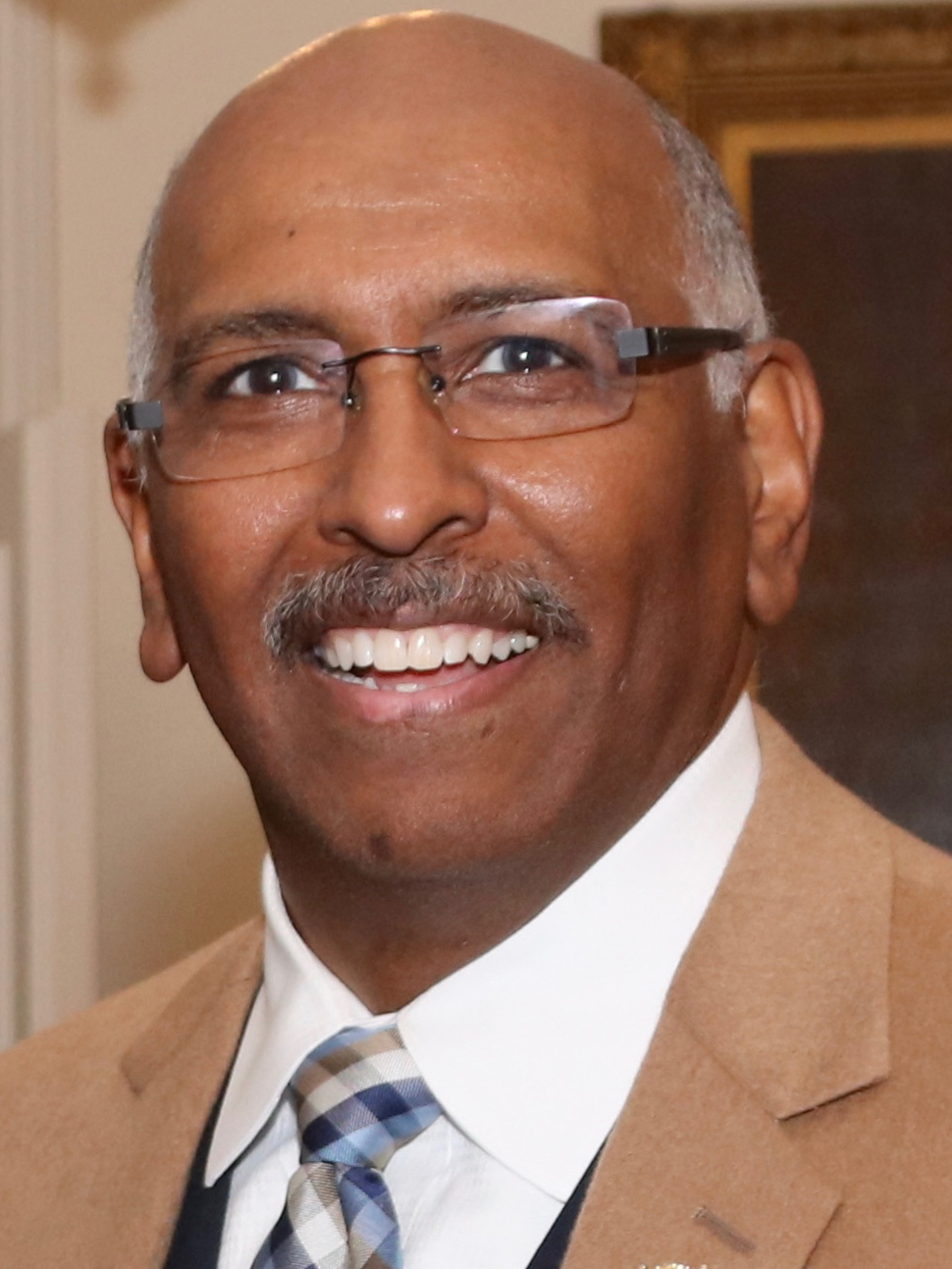
Michael Steele

==== Current ====
- John Dougall, Auditor of Utah (2013–2025), Utah state representative from District 27 (2003–2013) (endorsed Ron DeSantis)
- Roby Smith, treasurer of Iowa (2023–present) (endorsed Vivek Ramaswamy)

==== Former ====
- Geoff Duncan, lieutenant governor of Georgia (2019–2023), member of the Georgia House of Representatives (2013–2017) (endorsed Kamala Harris)
- Kerry Healey, lieutenant governor of Massachusetts (2003–2007), 2006 Republican nominee for Governor of Massachusetts
- Adam Laxalt, attorney general of Nevada (2015–2019), 2022 nominee for U.S. senator from Nevada and 2018 nominee for governor of Nevada (endorsed Ron DeSantis)
- Bob Orr, associate justice of the North Carolina Supreme Court (1995–2004) (endorsed Kamala Harris)
- Sandy Praeger, Kansas insurance commissioner (2003–2015) (endorsed Kamala Harris)
- Thomas Rath, attorney general of New Hampshire (1978–1980) (endorsed Kamala Harris)
- James C. Smith, Florida attorney general (1979–1987), secretary of state of Florida (1987–1995, 2002–2003) (endorsed Kamala Harris)
- Corey Stapleton, 2024 candidate for president, secretary of state of Montana (2017–2021)
- Michael Steele, lieutenant governor of Maryland (2003–2007), chair of the RNC (2009–2011), co-host of MSNBC's The Weekend (endorsed Kamala Harris)
- Cate Zeuske, secretary of the Wisconsin Department of Revenue (1996–2001), treasurer of Wisconsin (1991–1995), deputy secretary of the Wisconsin Department of Administration (2015–2018), Wisconsin state assemblywoman from District 4 (1985–1991) and District 54 (1983–1985) (endorsed Ron DeSantis)

=== State legislators ===
==== Current ====
- Ashley Bartley, member of the Vermont House of Representatives from Franklin District 1 (2023–present)
- Robert Cowles, member of the Wisconsin Senate (1987–2025), member of the Wisconsin State Assembly (1983–1987) (endorsed Kamala Harris)
- Dan Wolf, member of the New Hampshire House of Representatives from the Merrimack 5th district (2016–present) (endorsed Kamala Harris)
- Chase Tramont, member of the Florida House of Representatives from the 30th district (2022–present)

==== Former ====
- Rusty Bowers, member of the Arizona Senate from the 21st district (1997–2003), member of the Arizona House of Representatives from the 21st district (1993–1997) and the 25th district (2015–2023) (did not vote for Trump in the general election)
- Doug Coleman, member of the Arizona House of Representatives from the 16th district (2013–2019) and former mayor of Apache Junction, Arizona (1995–2007) (endorsed Kamala Harris)
- Paula Dockery, member of the Florida State Senate from the 17th district (2002–2012), member of the Florida House of Representatives from the 64th District (1996–2002) (Republican until 2017) (endorsed Kamala Harris)
- David Duke, former Grand Wizard of the KKK and former member of the Louisiana House of Representatives (endorsed Jill Stein, endorsement repudiated by Stein)
- Becky Edwards, Utah state representative from the 20th district (2009–2018)
- Steve Frias, member of the Rhode Island House of Representatives
- Susan Gerard, member of the Arizona Senate from the 18th district (2001–2003), member of the Arizona House of Representatives from the 18th district (1989–2001) (endorsed Kamala Harris)
- Deb Gullett, member of the Arizona House of Representatives from the 11th district (2003–2005) and from the 18th district (2001–2003) (endorsed Kamala Harris)
- Pete Hershberger, member of the Arizona House of Representatives from the 26th district (2001–2008) (endorsed Kamala Harris)
- Joel John, member of the Arizona House of Representatives from the 4th district (2021–2023) (endorsed Kamala Harris)
- Roger Katz, member of the Maine Senate from the 15th district (2014–2018) and from the 24th district (2010–2014) (endorsed Kamala Harris)
- Margaret S. Lewis, member of the Wisconsin State Assembly from the 38th district (1985–1991) (endorsed Kamala Harris)
- Barbara Lorman, member of the Wisconsin Senate from the 13th district (1980–1994) (endorsed Kamala Harris)
- Steve May, member of the Arizona House of Representatives from the 26th district (1999–2003) (endorsed Kamala Harris)
- John S. McCollister, member of the Nebraska Legislature from the 20th district (2015–2023) (endorsed Kamala Harris)
- Peter Mills, member of the Maine Senate from the 26th district (1996–2010) (endorsed Kamala Harris)
- Kevin Raye, member of the Maine Senate from the 29th district (2004–2012), president (2010–2012) (endorsed Kamala Harris)
- John S. Rodgers, member of the Vermont Senate from the Essex-Orleans district (2013–2021) (wrote in Phil Scott)
- Dale Schultz, member of the Wisconsin Senate from the 17th district (1991–2015), majority leader (2005–2007) (endorsed Kamala Harris)
- Robin Shaw, member of the Arizona House of Representatives from the 26th district (1992–1998) (endorsed Kamala Harris)
- Susan Bowers Vergeront, member of the Wisconsin State Assembly from the 60th district (1985–1995) (endorsed Kamala Harris)
- Jason Villalba, member of the Texas House of Representatives from the 114th district (2013–2019) (did not vote for Trump in general election)
- Roberta Voss, member of the Arizona House of Representatives from the 19th district (1997–2003) (endorsed Kamala Harris)
- Bob Worsley, member of the Arizona Senate from the 25th district (2013–2019) (endorsed Kamala Harris)

=== Other state and local officials ===
==== Current ====
- Manny Díaz Jr., education commissioner of Florida (2022–present), Florida state senator from District 36 (2018–2022), Florida state representative from District 103 (2012–2018) (endorsed Ron DeSantis)
- John Giles, mayor of Mesa, Arizona (2014-2025) (endorsed Kamala Harris)
- David Holt, mayor of Oklahoma City (Wrote a commentary in the Philadelphia Citizen saying he would vote for the candidate he believed had virtue. He did not name the candidate he was referring to, yet multiple media outlets reported he endorsed Harris and many people interpreted his commentary to mean he endorsed Harris. He denied endorsing either candidate in multiple comments on social media.)
- Joseph Ladapo, surgeon general of Florida (2021–present) (endorsed Ron DeSantis)
- Shawn Reilly, mayor of Waukesha, Wisconsin (2014–present) (endorsed Kamala Harris)
- Stephen Richer, recorder of Maricopa County, Arizona (2021–2025)
- Daniel Rickenmann, mayor of Columbia, South Carolina (2022–present) (endorsed Tim Scott)

==== Former ====
- Rich Crandall, director of the Wyoming Department of Education (2013–2014), Colorado commissioner of education (2016) (endorsed Kamala Harris)
- Tom Evslin, secretary of transportation for the State of Vermont (1981–1982), founder and chair of NG Advantage LLC (endorsed Kamala Harris)
- Stephanie Kopelousos, secretary of transportation of Florida (2007–2011), manager of Clay County, FL (2011–2018) (endorsed Ron DeSantis)
- Steve Laffey, 2024 candidate for president, mayor of Cranston, Rhode Island (2003–2007)
- Jennifer McCormick, Indiana superintendent of public instruction (2017–2021), 2024 candidate for governor (Republican until 2021) (endorsed Kamala Harris)
- Sandy Praeger, Kansas insurance commissioner (2003–2015) (endorsed Kamala Harris)
- Rick Romley, county attorney of Maricopa County, Arizona (1989–2005, 2010) (endorsed Kamala Harris)

== Former judicial officials ==
=== Federal ===
- J. Michael Luttig, judge of the U.S. Court of Appeals for the Fourth Circuit (1991–2006), U.S. assistant attorney general for the Office of Legal Counsel (1990–1991) (endorsed Kamala Harris)
- Deanell Reece Tacha, judge of the U.S. Court of Appeals for the Tenth Circuit (1985–2008) (endorsed Kamala Harris)

== State and county judicial officials ==
- David G. Deininger, judge of the Wisconsin Court of Appeals from District IV (1996–2007) (endorsed Kamala Harris)
- Robert F. Orr, associate justice of the North Carolina Supreme Court (1995–2004) (Independent; Republican until 2021) (endorsed Kamala Harris)
- B. Glen Whitley, Tarrant County, Texas judge (2007–2022) (endorsed Kamala Harris)

== Party officials ==
=== Former ===
- Steve Baer, president/executive director of the United Republican Fund of Illinois (1984–1991)
- Michael Brodkorb, deputy chair of the Republican Party of Minnesota (2009–2011) (endorsed Kamala Harris)
- Al Cárdenas, chair of the Republican Party of Florida (1999–2003), chairman of the American Conservative Union (2011–2014) (endorsed Kamala Harris)
- Ken Cole, Maine Republican Party chair (??–??) (endorsed Kamala Harris)
- Gerald (Rusty) Hills, chair of the Michigan Republican Party (2000–2003)
- Jennifer Horn, New Hampshire Republican Party chair (2013–2017), co-founder of The Lincoln Project (endorsed Kamala Harris)
- Robert A. G. Monks, Maine Republican Party chair (1977–1978) (endorsed Kamala Harris)
- Jennifer Nassour, Massachusetts Republican Party chair (2009–2011) (endorsed Nikki Haley)
- Ted O’Meara, Maine Republican Party chair (??–??) (endorsed Kamala Harris)
- Gary Reed, Michigan Republican Party executive director (1992–1995) (endorsed Kamala Harris)
- Chip Saltsman, Tennessee Republican Party chair (1999–2001) (endorsed Mike Pence)
- Amy Tarkanian, Nevada Republican Party chair (2011–2012) (endorsed Nikki Haley)
- Chris Vance, chair of the Washington State Republican Party (2001–2006), chair of the Washington State Forward Party (2022–2023) (endorsed Kamala Harris)

== Other public figures ==
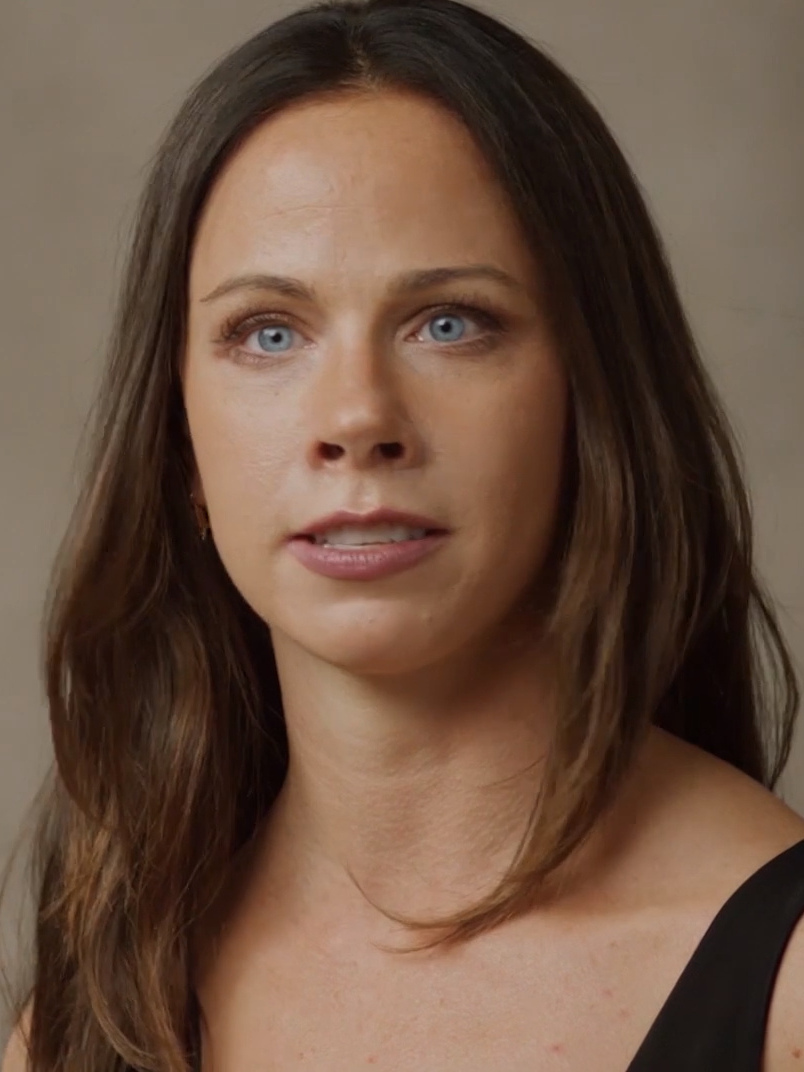
Barbara Pierce Bush

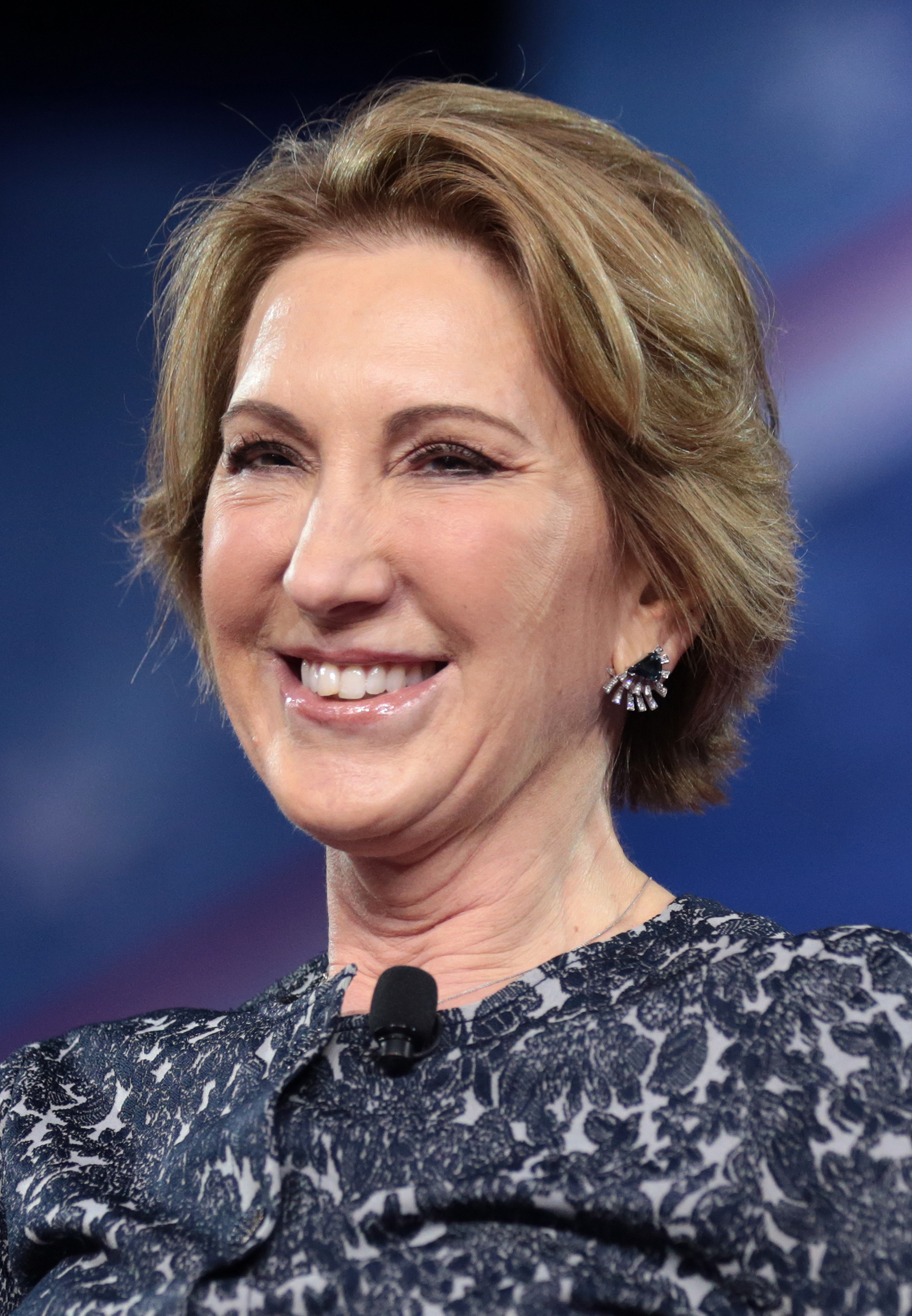
Carly Fiorina

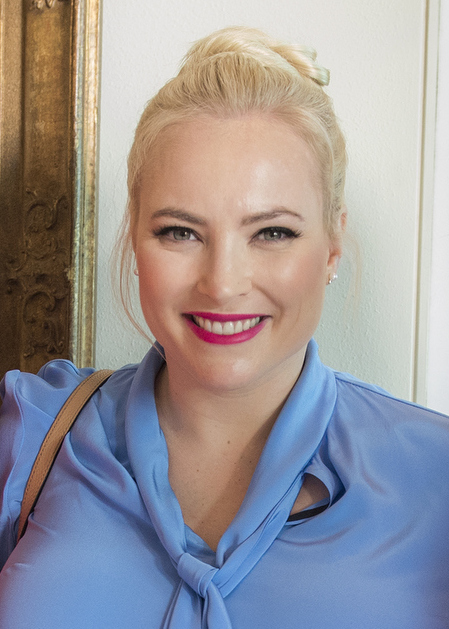
Meghan McCain

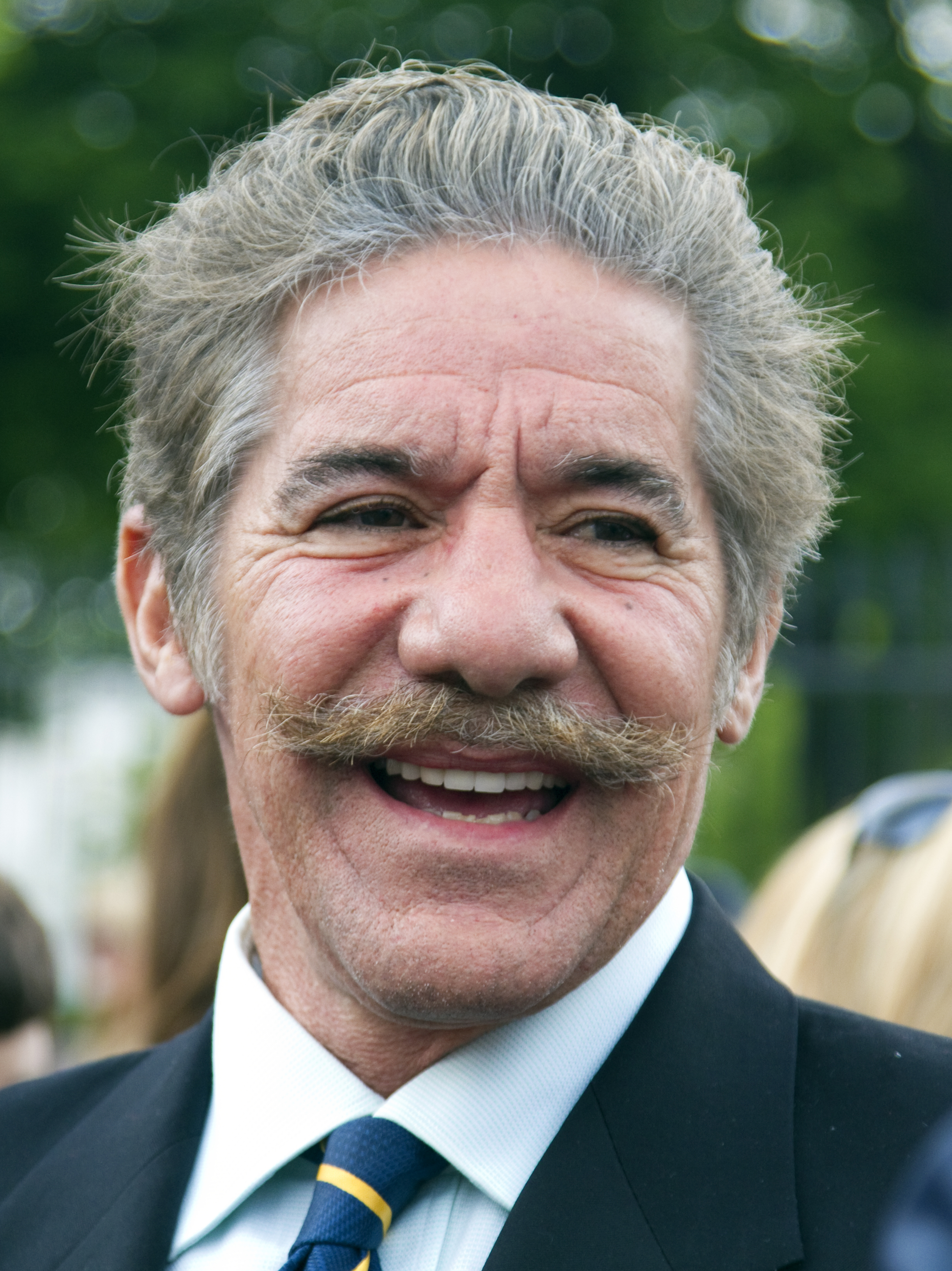
Geraldo Rivera

- Amanda Carpenter, political advisor (endorsed Kamala Harris)
- John Anthony Castro, perennial candidate (candidate for president)
- Mona Charen, columnist (endorsed Kamala Harris)
- Mary Pat Christie, First Lady of New Jersey (2010–2018) (endorsed Chris Christie, her husband)
- George Conway, lawyer and activist, launched the Anti-Psychopath PAC in July 2024 (endorsed Kamala Harris)
- S.E. Cupp, political commentator
- Carly Fiorina, CEO of Hewlett-Packard (1999–2005) and candidate for president in 2016
- David French, evangelical political commentator and former attorney, senior editor of The Dispatch, and columnist for The New York Times (Independent, Republican until 2018) (endorsed Kamala Harris)
- David Frum, political commentator and speech writer
- Jonah Goldberg, syndicated columnist
- Robert Kagan, former Republican, former U.S. State Department official, senior fellow at The Brookings Institution, contributor to The Washington Post
- Bill Kristol, political commentator (endorsed Kamala Harris)
- Sarah Longwell, political strategist (endorsed Kamala Harris)
- Meghan McCain, political commentator, daughter of 2008 nominee for President John McCain (endorsed Nikki Haley)
- Michael Medved, radio host (endorsed Kamala Harris)
- Ana Navarro, political commentator (endorsed Kamala Harris)
- Sophia A. Nelson, GOP counsel for U.S. House Committee on Government Reform and Oversight (endorsed Kamala Harris)
- Gregg Nunziata, executive director, Society for the Rule of Law, Federalist Society member, chief nominations counsel to the Senate Judiciary Committee, policy counsel to the Senate Republican Policy Committee, general counsel to Sen. Marco Rubio, attorney in the U.S. Department of Justice's Civil Rights Division
- Karen Pence, Second Lady of the United States (2017–2021), First Lady of Indiana (2013–2017) (endorsed Mike Pence, her husband)
- John J. Pitney, political scientist, Roy P. Crocker Professor of Politics at Claremont McKenna College (endorsed Kamala Harris)
- Ramesh Ponnuru, political commentator
- Geraldo Rivera, journalist, attorney, author, and political commentator (endorsed Kamala Harris)
- Mark Salter, former chief of staff to John McCain (endorsed Kamala Harris)
- Harry E. Sloan, former chairman of Metro-Goldwyn-Mayer and SBS Broadcasting (endorsed Joe Biden)
- Bart Starr Jr., son of Green Bay Packers quarterback Bart Starr (endorsed Kamala Harris)
- Bret Stephens, conservative columnist (endorsed Kamala Harris)
- Charlie Sykes, editor-in-chief of The Bulwark (endorsed Kamala Harris)
- Eric Tanenblatt, former chief of staff to Sonny Perdue
- Fred Trump III, author, advocate for people with disabilities, and Donald Trump's nephew (endorsed Kamala Harris)
- George Will, conservative columnist and political commentator (endorsed Kamala Harris)

== Organizations ==
- 43 Alumni for America (endorsed Kamala Harris)
- Americans for Prosperity (endorsed Nikki Haley)
- Haley Voters for Harris (endorsed Kamala Harris)
- The Lincoln Project (endorsed Kamala Harris)
- National Security Leaders for America (over 770 members) (endorsed Kamala Harris)
- Republican Accountability/Republican Voters Against Trump (endorsed Kamala Harris)
- Republicans for the Rule of Law (endorsed Kamala Harris)
- Wisconsin Republicans for Harris-Walz (endorsed Kamala Harris)
- Women4US.org (endorsed Kamala Harris)

== Publications ==
- The Bulwark
- National Review

== See also ==
- Age and health concerns about Donald Trump
- Endorsements in the 2024 Republican Party presidential primaries
- List of Democrats who opposed the Joe Biden 2024 presidential campaign
- List of Donald Trump 2024 presidential campaign endorsements
- List of Republicans who opposed the Donald Trump 2016 presidential campaign
- List of Republicans who opposed the Donald Trump 2020 presidential campaign
- Never Trump movement
- Presidential eligibility of Donald Trump
