= Charles Stimson =

Charles Stimson may be:

- Charles Stimson (lawyer) (born 1963), Defense Department official
- Charles D. Stimson (businessman) (1857–1929), lumber businessman

== See also ==
- Charlie Stimson (born 1992), English footballer
