= C. D. Stimson =

C. D. Stimson may be:

- Charles Stimson (lawyer) (born 1963), Defense Department official
- Charles D. Stimson (businessman) (1857-1929), lumber businessman
