= Deputy Assistant Secretary of Defense for Detainee Affairs =

Political appointment created by US President George W. Bush

The Deputy Assistant Secretary of Defense for Detainee Affairs (DASD-DA) is a political appointment created by United States President George W. Bush. The appointee has responsibility for captives apprehended during the "war on terror". The New York Times described one appointee as: "a primary adviser to Defense Secretary Donald H. Rumsfeld on detainee matters and his point man for dealing with foreign governments and international organizations on the issue."

Matthew Waxman was the first to hold this position. He was followed by Charles "Cully" Stimson, who resigned in February 2007 following controversial comments about lawyers representing detainees. Career State Department lawyer Sandra Hodgkinson held the position from 2007–2009.

The Washington Post reported in February 2009 that Phillip E. Carter was slated to be the new Deputy Assistant Secretary of Defense for Detainee Affairs, following speculation on Pentagon blogs about his appointment.

The Department of Defense has published 179 Guantanamo documents dossiers prepared from the unclassified documents prepared for captives 2004 Combatant Status Review Tribunals. Documents from the Deputy Assistant Secretary of Defense for Detainee Affairs routinely lead the documents that the Tribunals considered as evidence justifying the Guantanamo captives continued extrajudicial detention.

On February 16, 2010 William K. Lietzau was appointed as Deputy Assistant Secretary of Defense for Detainee Policy. By October 2011 he had taken on responsibility for the department's Rule of Law and Humanitarian Policy portfolio, and held the title "Deputy Assistant Secretary of Defense for rule of law and detainee policy".
