= Charles D. Stimson (businessman) =

Lumber businessman

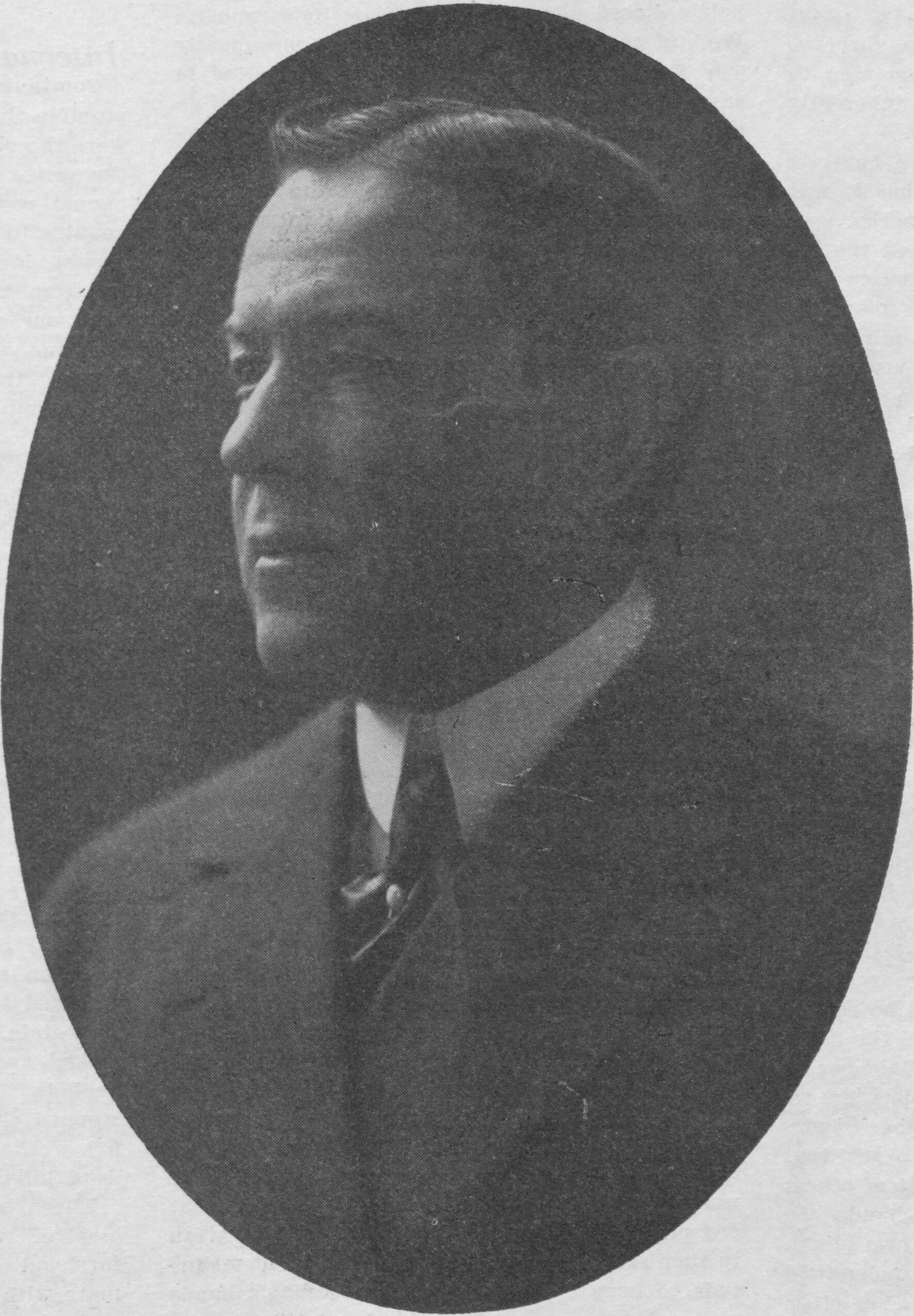
Stimson, circa 1918

Charles Douglas Stimson (1857–1929) was a prominent businessman in Seattle, Washington.

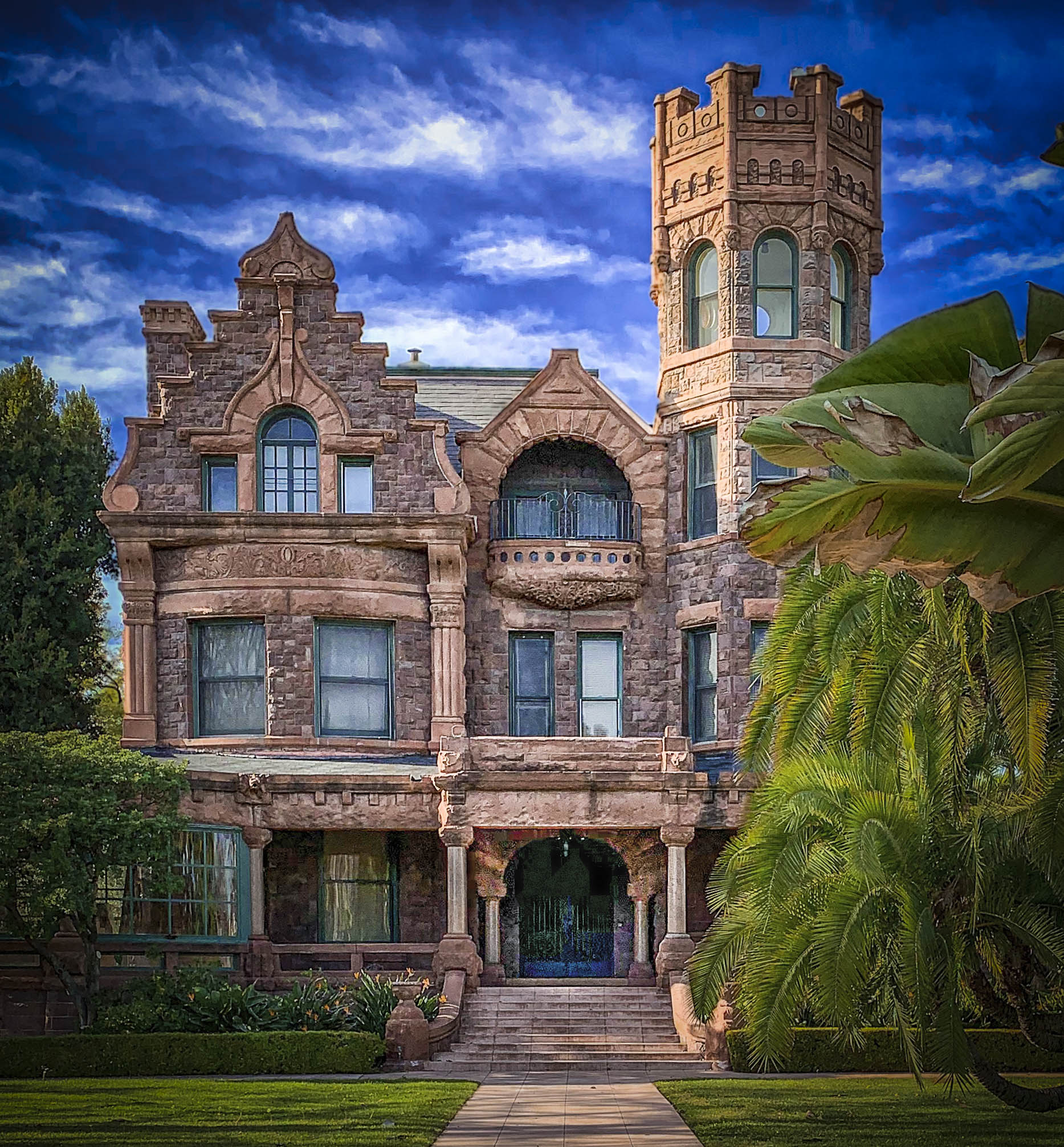
Thomas Douglas Stimson's house in Los Angeles (Stimson House)

He was the son of Thomas Douglas Stimson (1827–1898), a lumber baron with extensive properties in Michigan. He built the Colonnade Hotel in 1900. It was designed by Charles H. Bebb. He also had property in Los Angeles. He left his family an inheritance.

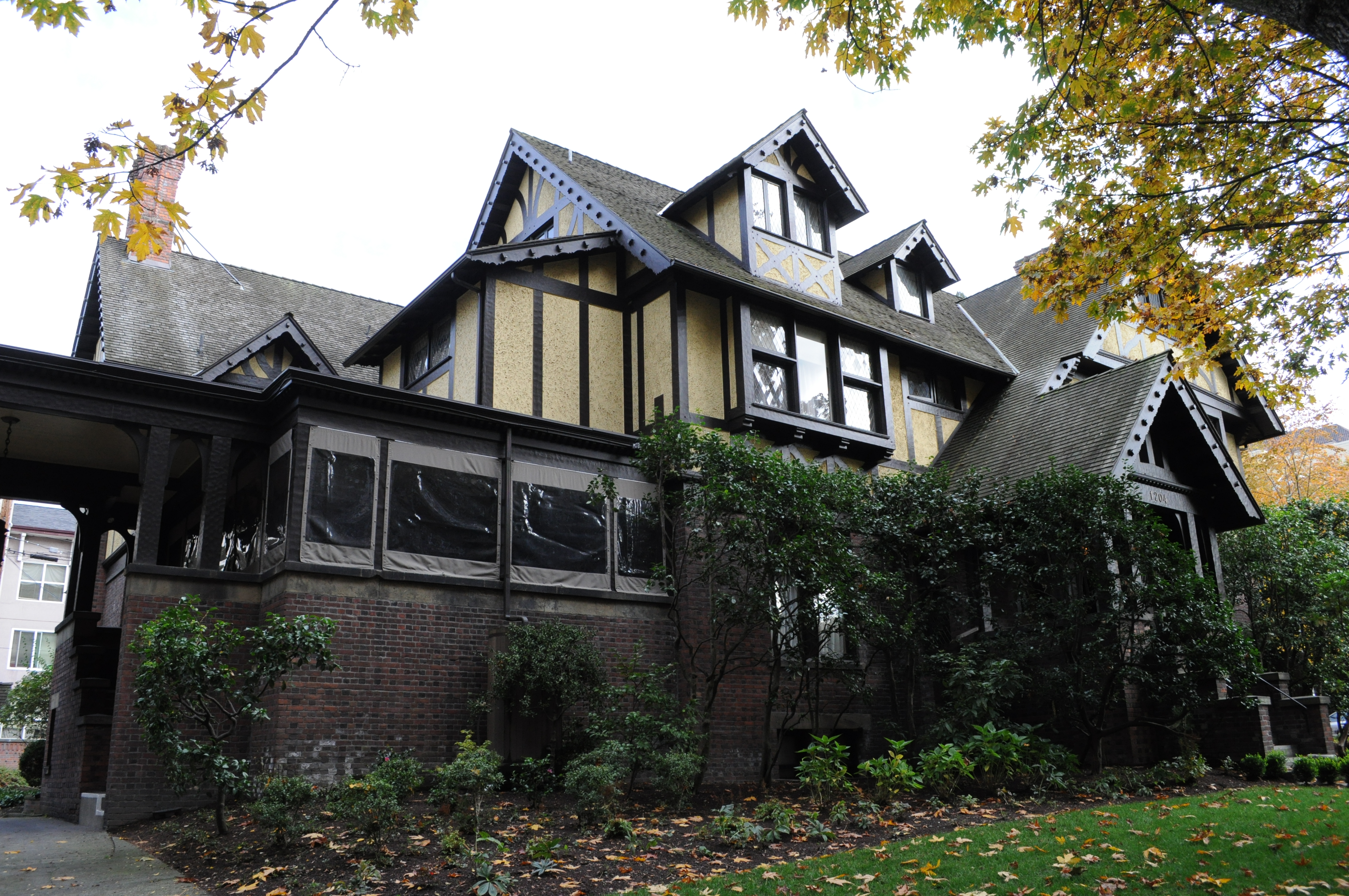
The home of Charles Stimson and his family in Seattle (Stimson-Green Mansion)

C. D. Stimson came to Seattle in 1888 as he and his brother Fred sought out virgin forest to exploit. He built a mansion at 1204 Minor Avenue on First Hill for his family. It was designed by Spokane architect Kirtland Cutter and built in 1901, a couple of years after the Great Seattle Fire. It is a Seattle Landmark. It remained in the family for decades and is now known as the Stimson-Green Mansion.

C. D. Stimson hired C. R. Aldrick to design the Exchange Building in 1904.

Stimson and his brother Frederick Spencer Stimson (1868–1921) owned several Seattle businesses and the Hollywood Farm in King County's Hollywood District (now in Woodinville, Washington). They built mansion retreats in Woodinville.

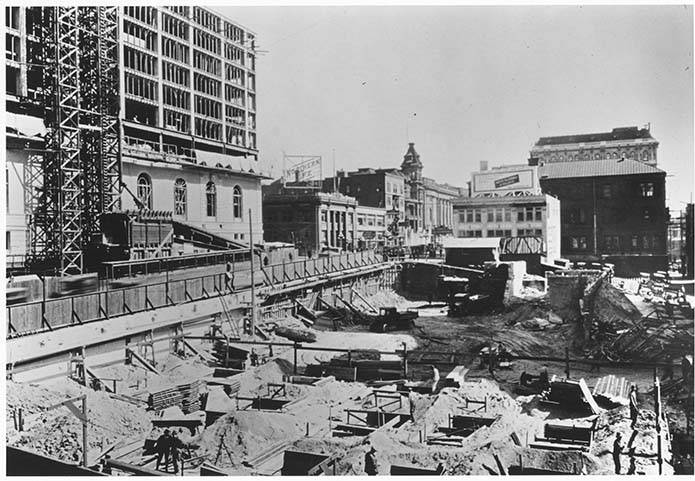
Construction of the Stimson Medical Center Building in Seattle in 1924

Stimson's daughter Dorothy Bullitt founded King Broadcasting in 1947. Her children became philanthropists giving to community and conservation causes in and around Seattle. Stimson Bullitt was her son.

== See also ==
- Stimson House in Los Angeles
- List of Seattle Landmarks
