= Charles Stimson (lawyer) =

American lawyer

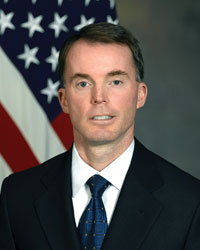

Deputy Assistant Secretary of Defense for Detainee Affairs
- In office 2005 – February 2, 2007
- President: George W. Bush
- Preceded by: Matthew Waxman
- Succeeded by: Sandra Hodgkinson

Personal details
- Born: Charles Douglas Stimson; June 13, 1963 (age 63)
- Education: Kenyon College; George Mason University

Charles Douglas "Cully" Stimson (born June 13, 1963) is an American lawyer and government official. Stimson served as the Deputy Assistant Secretary of Defense for Detainee Affairs from 2005 until his resignation on February 2, 2007, following a controversy about his statements on legal representation for prisoners at Guantánamo Bay. Following his time in the George W. Bush administration, Stimson joined The Heritage Foundation, where he was a senior legal fellow and manager of the National Security Law Program. Earlier in his career, Stimson served as an Assistant United States Attorney for the District of Columbia and as Vice President for Private Equity Mergers & Acquisitions at Marsh & McLennan Companies.

== Family and education ==
Stimson is the son of Douglas Joseph Stimson, chairman emeritus of the family's Seattle-based real estate holding firm, the C.D. Stimson Co., and Virginia Mullane. The Stimson family is one of the wealthiest in Washington, known for founding the Stimson Lumber Company. Stimson has one sister, Lori. He studied at Kenyon College and obtained a J.D. degree at George Mason University.

== Career ==
=== Defense department ===
==== Detainee Affairs ====
The Pentagon created the Office of Detainee Affairs, and with it Stimson's post, in July 2004:

An as-yet-unnamed deputy assistant secretary who will report to the undersecretary for policy will head the office. The new deputy will chair a joint committee composed of the undersecretary for intelligence and representatives from the Joint Staff, the Office of General Counsel, the Department of the Army, and others who might be involved in detainee affairs.

Stimson, an attorney by profession, was formerly a U.S. Navy JAG officer from 1992 to 1997.

==== Guantanamo Bay detention camp ====
Stimson first received press attention in October 2006, when he told Reuters that more than 300 Guantánamo detainees might remain there for the rest of their lives because nations refused to accept them.

In January 2007, he made comments concerning the legal representation of Guantánamo detainees stating that "corporate CEOs seeing this should ask firms to choose between lucrative retainers and representing terrorists." The Pentagon later issued a statement that Stimson's comments were not representative of Pentagon policy.

On January 17, 2007, Stimson wrote a letter of apology, published in The Washington Post. His apology was criticized by The New York Times in an editorial, for the appearance of insincerity. In 2017, Stimson said his comments made one decade ago were a mistake that do not represent his professional views: "I made a boneheaded statement, quite frankly it was an emotional response generated by my loss of my 295 colleagues who...were killed on 9/11 at the World Trade Center."

==== Resignation ====
On February 2, 2007, a Department of Defense spokesman announced that Stimson had decided to resign because the controversy had "hampered his ability to be effective in" his office. Stimson said that the Secretary of Defense, Robert Gates, had not asked him to resign.

=== Business ===
Stimson serves as vice chair of his family's commercial real estate company in Seattle.

=== Heritage Foundation ===
Stimson was a senior legal fellow at The Heritage Foundation, a conservative think-tank, and an instructor at the Naval Justice School in Newport, Rhode Island. In September 2010 he authored a report, titled "Just Say No", asserting that California's proposed Regulate, Control and Tax Cannabis Act of 2010 would "worsen the state’s drug problems—addiction, violence, disorder, and death". Stimson continues to write on detainee issues.

=== Unsuccessful Navy nomination ===
Stimson was a Captain in the Judge Advocate General's Corps, U.S. Navy, reserve component and is the Commanding Officer of the Navy Appellate Government unit. In June 2017, President Donald Trump nominated Stimson to become General Counsel of the Navy. In July 2017, the nomination was reported favorably by the Senate Committee on Armed Services. Failing to receive consideration by the full Senate, it was returned to the President at the beginning of 2018. The nomination was resubmitted in January 2018 and again reported favorably by the Committee on Armed Services in May 2018. Failing to receive consideration by the full Senate for a second time, it was returned to the President at the beginning of 2019.

== Personal life ==
Stimson is a contributor to the Federalist Society.

Stimson is chairman of the board of directors for the U.S. Soccer Foundation.
