= Phil Carter =

American lawyer

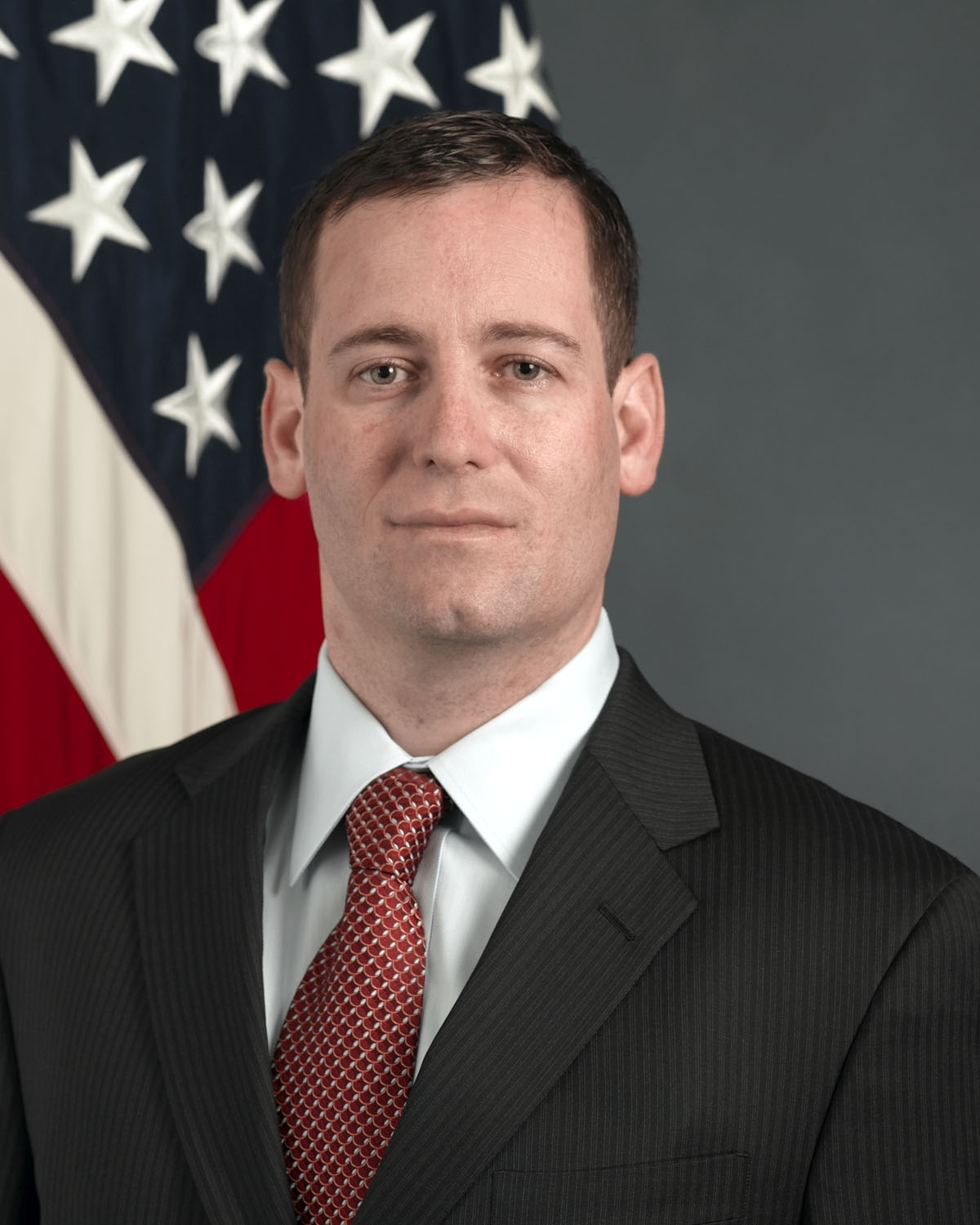

Deputy Assistant Secretary of Defense for Detainee Policy
- In office April 27, 2009 – December 2009
- President: Barack Obama
- Secretary: Robert Gates
- Preceded by: Sandra Hodgkinson
- Succeeded by: William K. Lietzau

Personal details
- Spouse: Democratic
- Education: University of California, Los Angeles (B.A., J.D.)

Military service
- Branch/service: United States Army
- Years of service: 1997-2006
- Rank: Captain
- Battles/wars: Iraq War; War in Afghanistan

Phillip Eugene Carter is an American lawyer, writer, and former officer in the United States Army. Carter was a founding member of Iraq and Afghanistan Veterans of America, and he also served as a principal of the Truman National Security Project. He was senior fellow and counsel at the Center for a New American Security, and director of the CNAS research program on the Military, Veterans & Society. Beginning September 2018, he served as the director of the Personnel & Resources Program at the Homeland Security Operational Analysis Center in Washington, D.C. Carter now works as corporate counsel for Google, supporting the company's public sector business, and teaches as an adjunct professor of law at Georgetown University Law Center.

== Education ==
Carter attended the University of California, Los Angeles, earning a Bachelor's Degree there in 1997, and his Juris Doctor in 2004. Carter also received the Harry S. Truman Scholarship in 1996.

== Legal career ==
Carter practiced law as an associate at McKenna Long & Aldridge, first in Los Angeles, and later in New York City. He specialized in government contracts and national security law there, including representation of leading defense and aerospace contractors. He contributed to amicus briefs for FAIR v. Rumsfeld and Hamdan v. Rumsfeld. Carter took a leave of absence from his law firm in 2005–06, after being called to active duty by the Army, to serve in Iraq.

In June 2008, Carter took a leave of absence to join the Barack Obama campaign as its national veterans director. He returned to his position at McKenna Long & Aldridge in 2010 after resigning as Deputy Assistant Secretary of Defense for Detainee Policy.

In 2011, Carter left McKenna to join Caerus Associates, a strategy and design consulting firm in Arlington, Virginia, as the company's Chief Operating Officer and General Counsel.

In 2013, Carter left Caerus to join CNAS, a defense policy think tank in Washington, as senior fellow and counsel. At CNAS, Carter directed the Military, Veterans, and Society research program, and also served as the think tank's counsel. In 2018, Carter left CNAS to join the RAND Corporation, where he directed RAND's personnel and resources research program for the Homeland Security Operational Analysis Center, the federally-funded research and development center (FFRDC) that supports the Department of Homeland Security.

In 2020, Carter left RAND to practice law as senior corporate counsel for Tableau, a Salesforce company, where he worked from 2020 to 2023. He now serves as corporate counsel for Google, supporting Google's public sector business. In addition to this work, Carter also teaches at Georgetown University Law Center as an adjunct professor.

== Writing career ==
He wrote the "Intel Dump" blog beginning in 2002. In 2008, he began writing this blog for The Washington Post, and edited the Convictions legal blog for Slate magazine. Carter's articles have appeared in many other publications, including the New York Times, Washington Monthly, Wall Street Journal, and Chicago Tribune. In 2006, he won an award (with Dahlia Lithwick and Emily Bazelon) for a feature on torture that appeared in Slate.

== Government service ==
In November 2020, Carter was named a volunteer member of the Joe Biden presidential transition Agency Review Team to support transition efforts related to the United States Department of Veterans Affairs.

=== United States Army service ===
Carter served on active and reserve duty for nine years in the U.S. Army as a Military Police and Civil Affairs officer. He served from 1997 to 2001, including assignments in Korea, Texas and the Mojave Desert. From October 2005 to September 2006, he was an embedded adviser with the Iraqi police in Baqubah, the capital of Iraq's Diyala province. His team's work was profiled by The Wall Street Journal in a June 13, 2006, front-page story, and by NPR as well.

=== Deputy Assistant Secretary of Defense for Detainee Policy ===
The Washington Post reported in February 2009 that Carter was slated to be the new Deputy Assistant Secretary of Defense for Detainee Affairs, following speculation on Pentagon blogs about his appointment. The Pentagon formally announced Carter's appointment on May 6, 2009. Carter was the fourth official to be appointed to this post, replacing career diplomat Sandra Hodgkinson.

In November 2009 Carter announced his resignation, effective in December 2009, for personal reasons. The exact date he submitted his resignation was not made public. In his position, he traveled frequently to Guantanamo Bay, Iraq and Afghanistan. Carter was the chief architect of the Obama administration plan to close Guantanamo Bay, and bring detainees to a maximum security prison in Northwest Illinois. His last official trip was to Thomson, Illinois, the site of a prison the Obama administration has decided to use to house some captives currently held in detention in Guantanamo, in Cuba.
