= Bald Peak =

Mountain in Oregon, United States

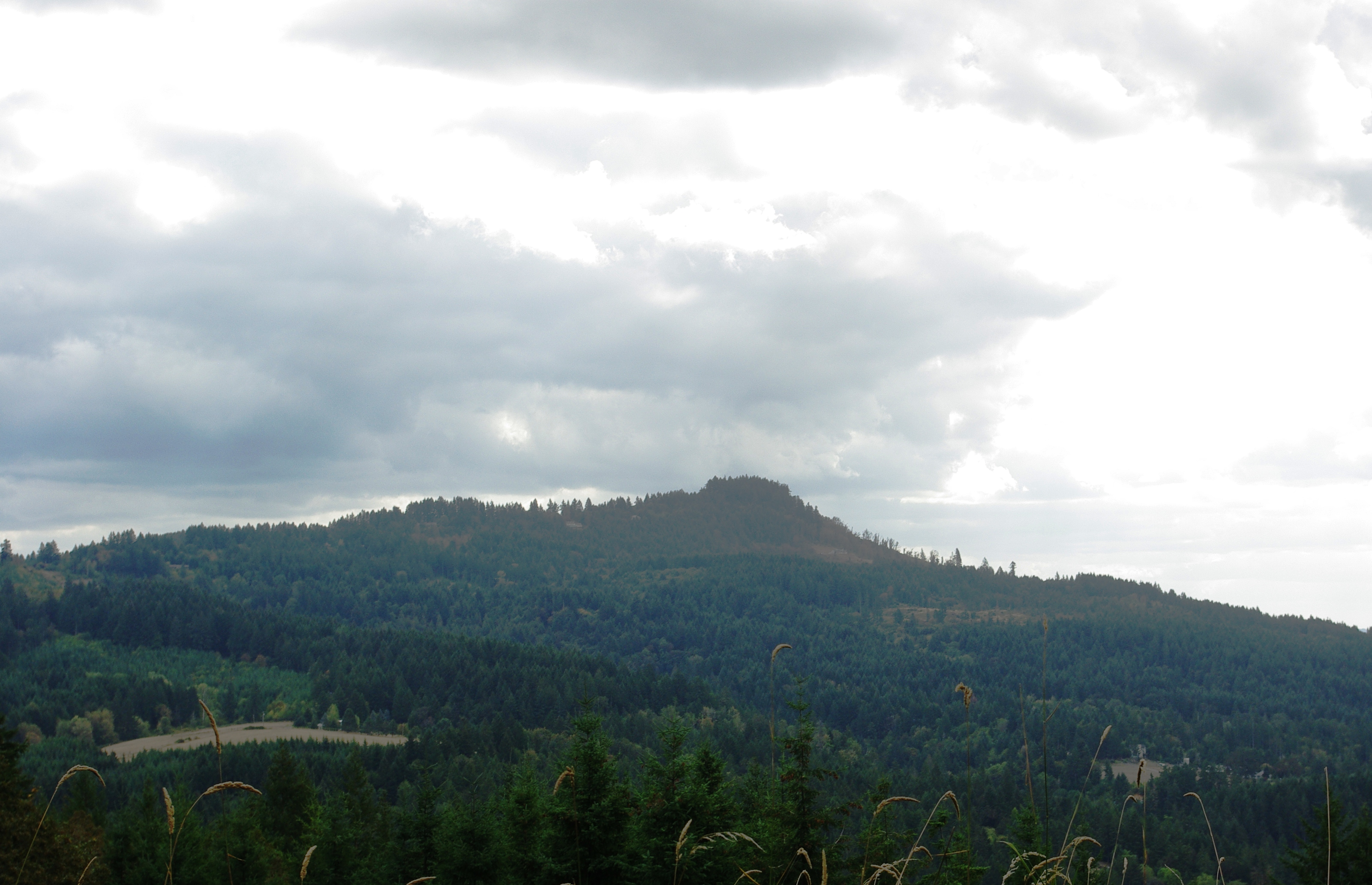

Highest point
- Elevation: 1624+ ft (495+ m) NAVD 88
- Prominence: 1,400 feet (427 m)
- Coordinates: 45°23′45″N 123°03′22″W

Geography
- Location within Oregon
- Location: Yamhill County, Oregon, U.S.
- Parent range: Chehalem Mountains
- Topo map: USGS Laurelwood

Bald Peak is a mountain top and highest point in the Chehalem Mountains in the Northwest area of the U.S. state of Oregon. Located in Yamhill County near the county line with Washington County, the summit at 1624+ feet (495+ m) is the highest point in the Willamette Valley. Bald Peak State Scenic Viewpoint is a 26-acre (11 ha) state park located on the peak.

== Geology ==
The mountain range that includes the peak is composed of a single land mass that was uplifted by tectonics. Bald Peak is both the highest part of the range and the highest point within the Willamette Valley.

== Chehalem Mountain-Bald Peak fire ==
Bald Peak was burning from September 8 to September 14 in the 2020 Oregon wildfire season. About 875 acres were burnt. It was caused by a campfire on private property.
