= Chehalem Ridge Nature Park =

Public park in Washington County, Oregon, United States

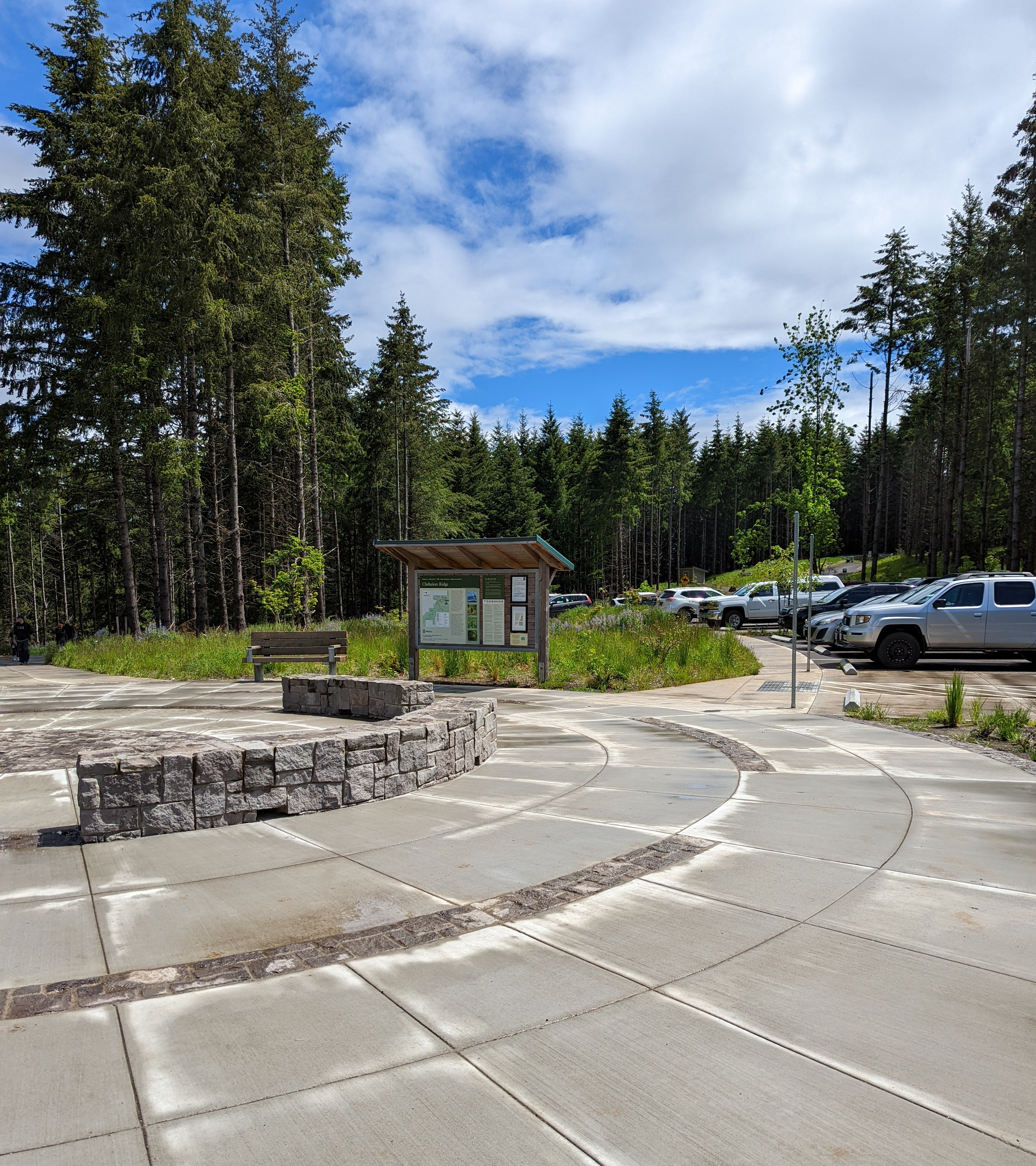
- Welcome plaza in 2022
- Interactive map of Chehalem Ridge Nature Park
- Type: Public
- Location: Near Gaston, Oregon; United States
- Coordinates: 45.44°N 123.08°W
- Area: 1,260 acres (510 hectares)
- Created: 2021
- Operator: Metro
- Status: Open
- Website: Chehalem Ridge Nature Park

Chehalem Ridge Nature Park is a 1,260 acres (510 ha) nature park in the Portland metropolitan area in the U.S. state of Oregon. Opened in 2021, the park is owned and operated by Metro, the regional government in the Oregon portion of the metro area. This is despite that the park is located outside the regional government's boundary. The park is named after the Chehalem Mountains, where the park is located. The park is located off Dixon Mill Road, east of Gaston between Oregon Route 47 and Oregon Route 219.

== History ==
Metro purchased the property for the park in 2008 from Stimson Lumber Company using money from voter approved bonds passed in 1995 and 2006. In 2010, restoration to the former tree farm began with tree thinning and removal of invasive plant species. Construction of park amenities started in 2020, paid for from other bond measures in 2013, 2016, and 2019. Chehalem Ridge opened on December 13, 2021, after $5.2 million in construction.

== Features ==
Located in southwestern Washington County, there are three streams located in the park. The built environment includes two picnic shelters, 10 miles (16 km) of trails, park benches, restrooms, and parking. The highest point in the park is Iowa Hill, at the end of the Mampal Trail. Flora at the park includes Douglas fir trees, Oregon white oak, Pacific madrone, and western red cedars. Animals include black-tailed deer, bobcats, hermit thrush, coyotes, ruffed grouse, Douglas squirrels, and alligator lizards.

== See also ==
- Blue Lake Regional Park
- Cooper Mountain Nature Park
- Oxbow Regional Park
