= Tualatin Valley =

Farming and suburban region southwest of Portland, Oregon

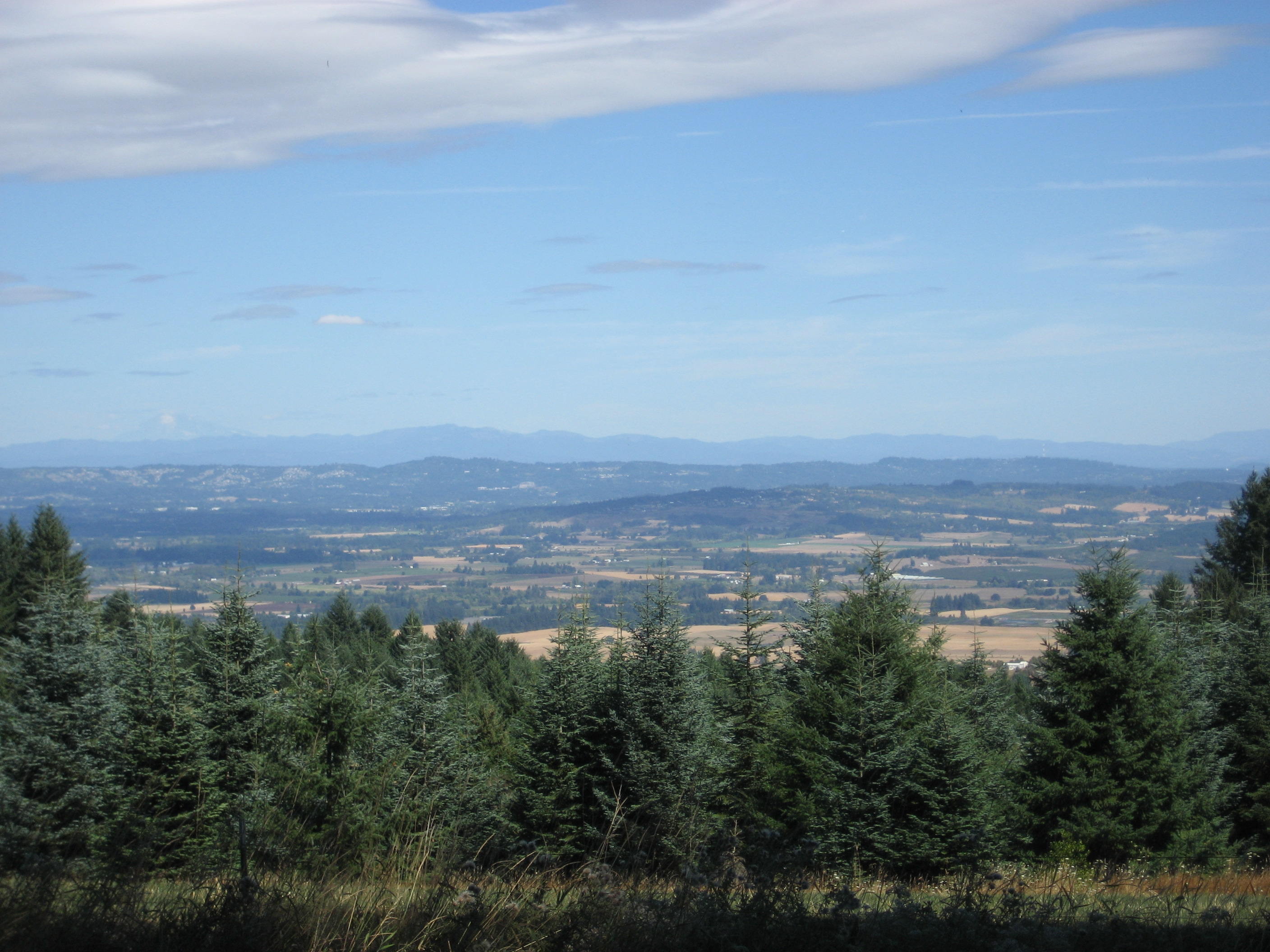
- The Tualatin Valley from Bald Peak State Scenic Viewpoint

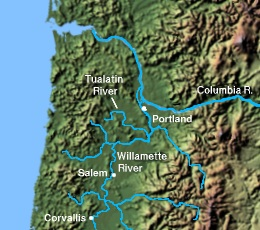
- The Tualatin River
- Floor elevation: 180 ft (55 m)

Geography
- Location: Washington County & Clackamas County, Oregon
- Borders on: Northern Oregon Coast Range (West); Tualatin Mountains (North and East); Chehalem Mountains (South)
- Coordinates: 45°30′38″N 122°59′19″W

The Tualatin Valley is a farming and suburban region southwest of Portland, Oregon. The valley is formed by the meandering Tualatin River, a tributary of the Willamette River at the northwest corner of the Willamette Valley, east of the Northern Oregon Coast Range. Most of the valley is located within Washington County, separated from Portland by the Tualatin Mountains. Communities in the Tualatin Valley include Banks, Forest Grove, Cornelius, Hillsboro, Aloha, Beaverton, Sherwood, Tigard, and Tualatin.

== History ==
In the early 19th century, the valley was inhabited by the Atfalati, a hunter-gatherer Kalapuyan band that spoke a dialect of Northern Kalapuyan. In the middle 19th century, the Atfalati lived in several villages in the valley, including Chakeipi ("Place of the Beaver", translated by early white settlers as "Beaver Dam"). Early Euro-American settlers called the valley the "Twality Plains", a corruption of the name of the Atfalati tribe. Other early variations included Falatin, Nefalatine, Twalaity, and Quality, with each roughly translated as slow river to describe the Tualatin River, or may translate as land without trees.

The valley was one of the earliest settled farming regions in Oregon, as settlers began arriving in 1840. In the spring of 1847, Lawrence Hall filed the first land claim, comprising 640 acres (2.6 km^{2}), at Beaver Dam (later Beaverton) and constructed the first grist mill in the valley. In 1849 Thomas Hicklin Denney and his wife Berrilla built the first sawmill in the Beaverton area, leading to a later boom in the timber industry.

The lack of roads connecting the upper valley to the Willamette River quickly became a hindrance to early settlers. In 1850, the Oregon Territory created the Portland & Valley Plank Road Company to build a road through the Tualatin Hills connecting Portland with Beaverton. The road was completed in 1860 after financial setbacks. According to Oregon historian Stewart Holbrook, the building of the plank road was the decisive event that allowed Portland to surpass its rival Oregon City for supremacy as the economic hub of the territory. The railroad was extended into the valley in 1868.

The growth of agriculture in the valley was eventually limited in the middle 20th century by the need for irrigation. In 1966, the United States Bureau of Reclamation built the Tualatin Project, bringing additional water to many parts of the valley in the last federal reclamation project in the Pacific Northwest.

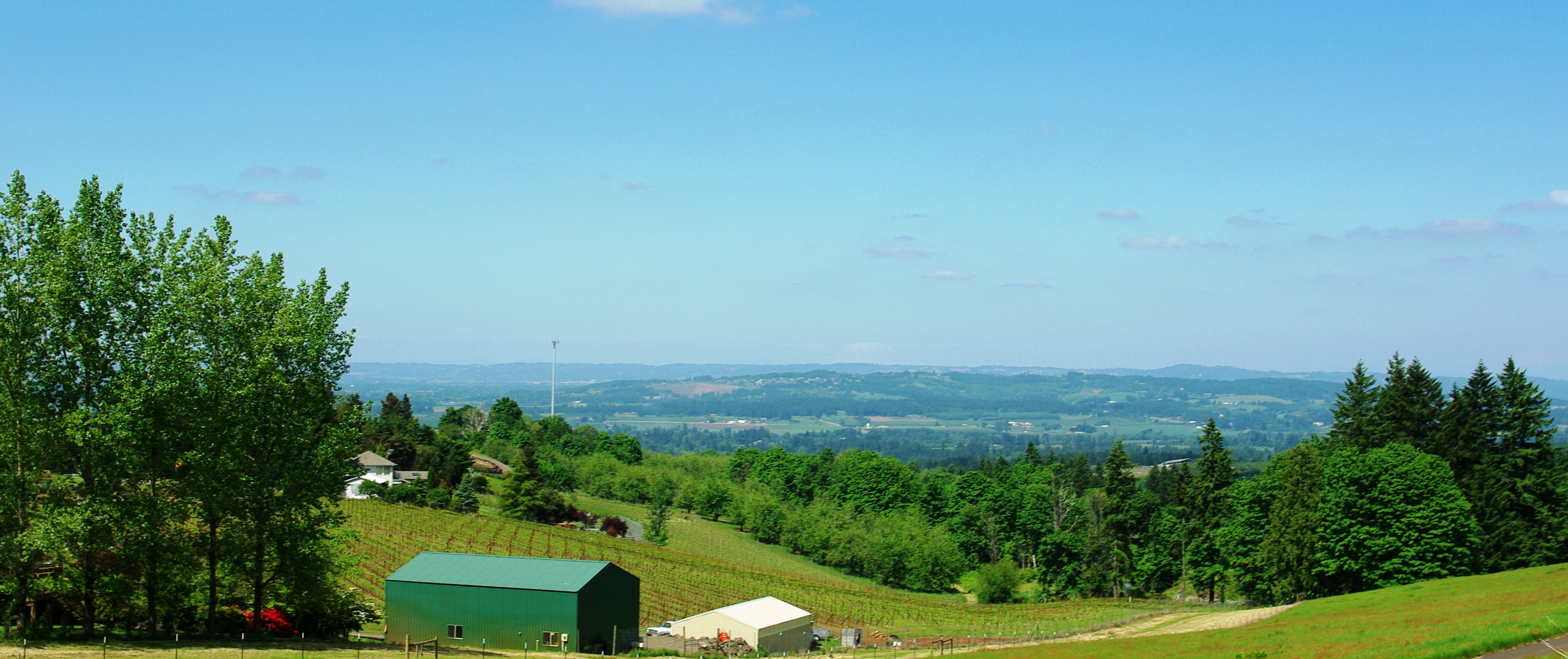
Valley from the Chehalem Mountains on the southern end of the valley

In the second half of the 20th century the valley became increasingly suburbanized and now forms a distinct cultural area that rivals Portland itself in political and economic influence. The communities along the Tualatin Valley Highway (the descendant of the old plank road), form a suburban corridor stretching west of Beaverton. Beaverton is famous as the location of the Nike, Inc. campus, the company's world-wide headquarters. Nike, along with Intel in Hillsboro, provide a large base of employment in the valley. Much of the valley is now within the Portland urban growth boundary, resulting in a suburban growth patterns that interspersed with remaining areas of orchards and farm fields. Most of the communities in the valley are served by TriMet, the Portland-area mass transit agency. In 1998, the MAX Light Rail system was extended from Portland into the valley as far as Hillsboro.

Tualatin Valley sits at the northwestern edge of the Willamette Valley, known for its production of wine, especially Pinot noir. Established in 1970 in Tualatin Valley, Ponzi Vineyards was among the first Oregon wineries to produce estate-grown Pinot Noir. Its 130 acres of family-owned vineyards are LIVE Certified Sustainable and it is one of the largest wineries in Oregon. As of June 3, 2020, Ponzi Vineyards is located within the Laurelwood District AVA which was approved by the Alcohol and Tobacco Tax and Trade Bureau (TTB). The Tualatin Hills AVA was also approved at the same time in 2020. The two AVAs share a small portion of their boundaries and contain among the highest concentrations of Laurelwood soils in the state.

== Geography ==
The valley is traversed by the Tualatin River and is bordered on the north and east by the Tualatin Mountains, a spur of the Northern Oregon Coast Range. The latter range also comprises the valley's western border. To the south lie the Chehalem Mountains, separating the region from the main Willamette Valley. The Tualatin River flows mainly from the west to the east and leaves the valley in the southeast at West Linn in Clackamas County. Tualatin Valley's geographical center is located southeast of Hillsboro, and the general elevation of the valley is 180 feet (55 m) above sea-level.

== Attractions ==
- Tualatin River National Wildlife Refuge
- L.L. Stub Stewart State Park
- Scoggins Valley Park & Henry Hagg Lake
- Jackson Bottom Wetlands Preserve
- Rice Northwest Museum of Rocks and Minerals

== See also ==
- Tualatin Plains
