= Bald Peak State Scenic Viewpoint =

State park in Oregon, USA

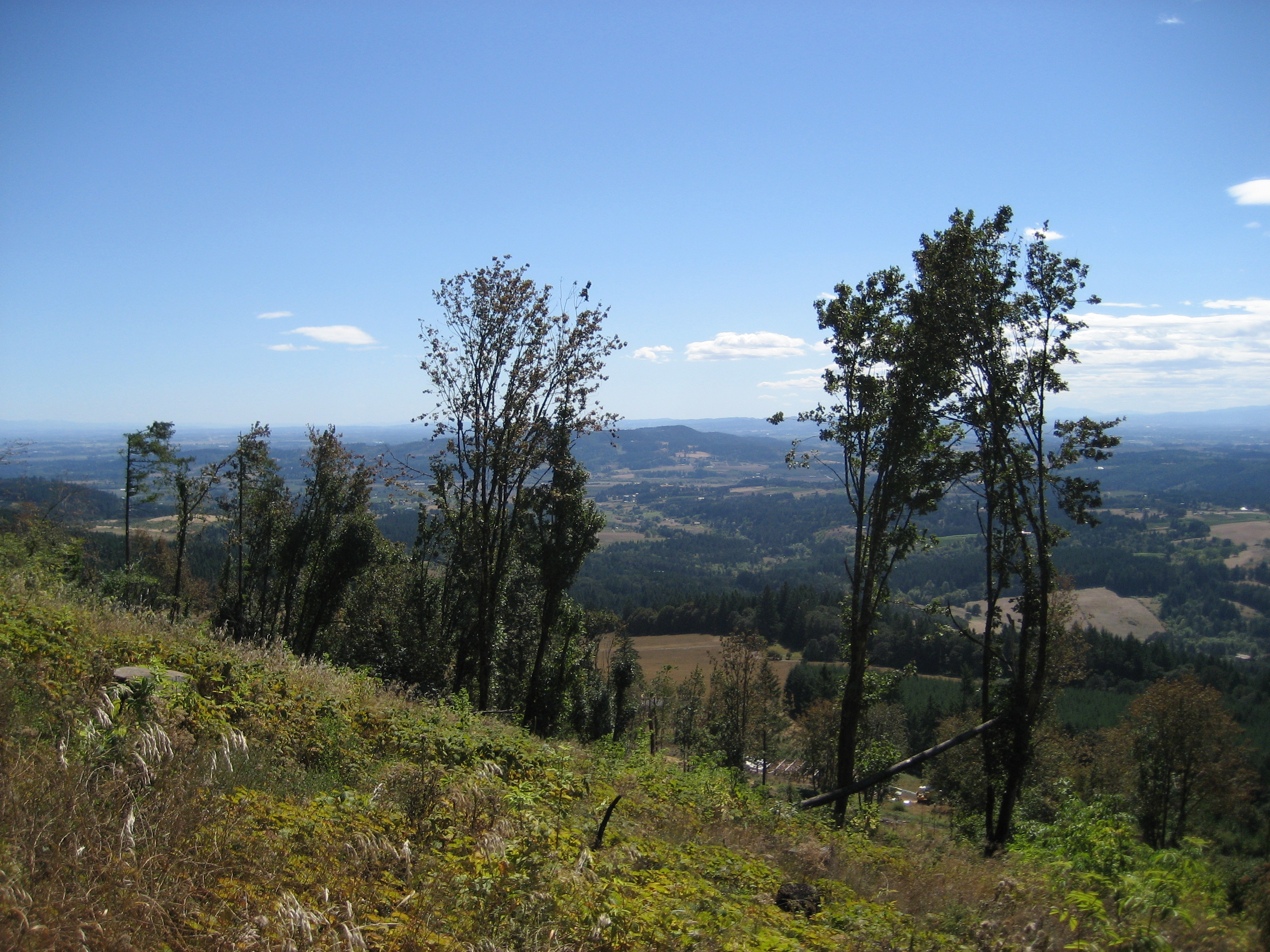
- Looking southeast from the park.

- Location within Oregon Location within the United States
- Type: Public, state
- Location: Yamhill County, Oregon
- Nearest city: Newberg
- Coordinates: 45°23′40″N 123°03′18″W
- Area: 26 acres (11 ha)
- Operator: Oregon Parks and Recreation Department
- Status: Day use only
- Parking: Yes

Bald Peak State Scenic Viewpoint is a state park located atop Bald Peak located in Yamhill County, in the United States. The day use only park offers picnic tables and a hiking trail for views of the Willamette Valley and the Cascade Range. The state of Oregon acquired the 26 acres (11 ha) in 1931, after Yamhill and Washington counties requested a park from the state.

== History ==
Bald Peak was acquired by the state in 1931 after county officials in Washington and Yamhill counties lobbied the state parks commission for a state park for the two counties. The land was purchased from Samuel Otto on June 4, 1931, with the park originally named Bald Peak State Park. During the Great Depression, the Civilian Conservation Corps built picnic tables, restrooms, and a parking area at the site. In the mid-1930s, an annual service on Easter began at the park, organized by local churches that continues to be held as of 2019.

In 1939, the location was considered by the parks department as a memorial to the pioneer women of Oregon. State officials decided against this location due to the lack of water and its isolated location away from major roads. In 1996, the park was one of over 50 parks that the Oregon Parks and Recreation Department proposed closing due to a state budget deficit that reduced funding for the department. However, Bald Peak and the other parks remained open after political pressure forced the department to reconsider their plans.

== Details ==
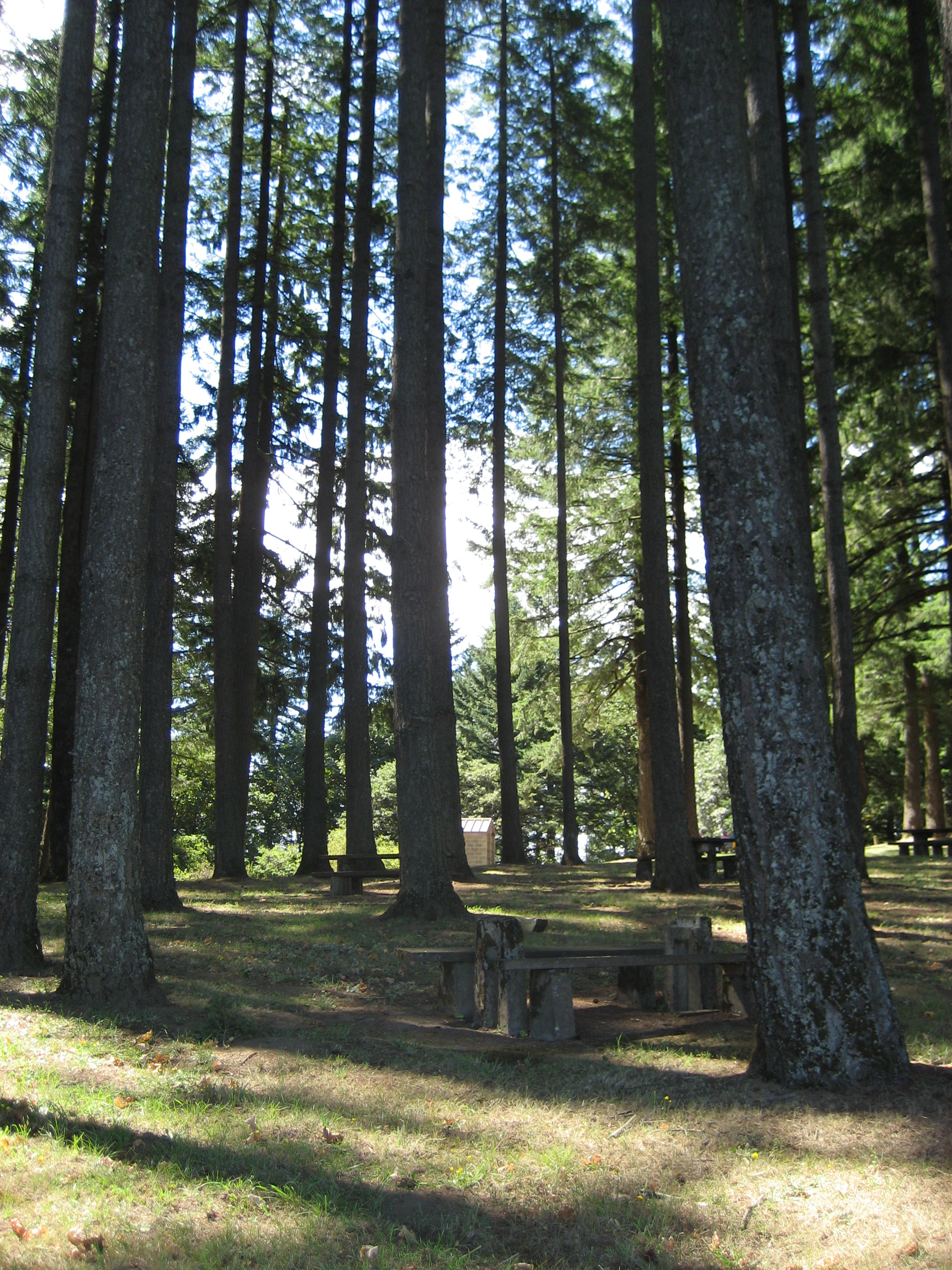
Forested section of the park.

Bald Peak is on top of the Chehalem Mountains at an elevation of 1,629 feet (497 m) above sea level, the highest point in the mountain range. The closest community to the 26-acre (11 ha) park is Laurelwood, Oregon, with the park generally situated between the cities of Hillsboro to the north and Newberg to the south near the county boundary line between Yamhill and Washington counties. At the park are restrooms, picnic tables, parking, a trail, a forest with Douglas fir trees, but no drinking water. In clear weather, the park offers views of Mount Hood, Mount St. Helens, Mount Jefferson, Mount Adams, and Mount Rainier. The viewpoint also gives panoramas of the Tualatin Valley to the north of the park and the Yamhill Valley to the south, with both valleys being parts of the larger Willamette Valley.

== See also ==
- List of Oregon state parks
