= William K. Lietzau =

American lawyer

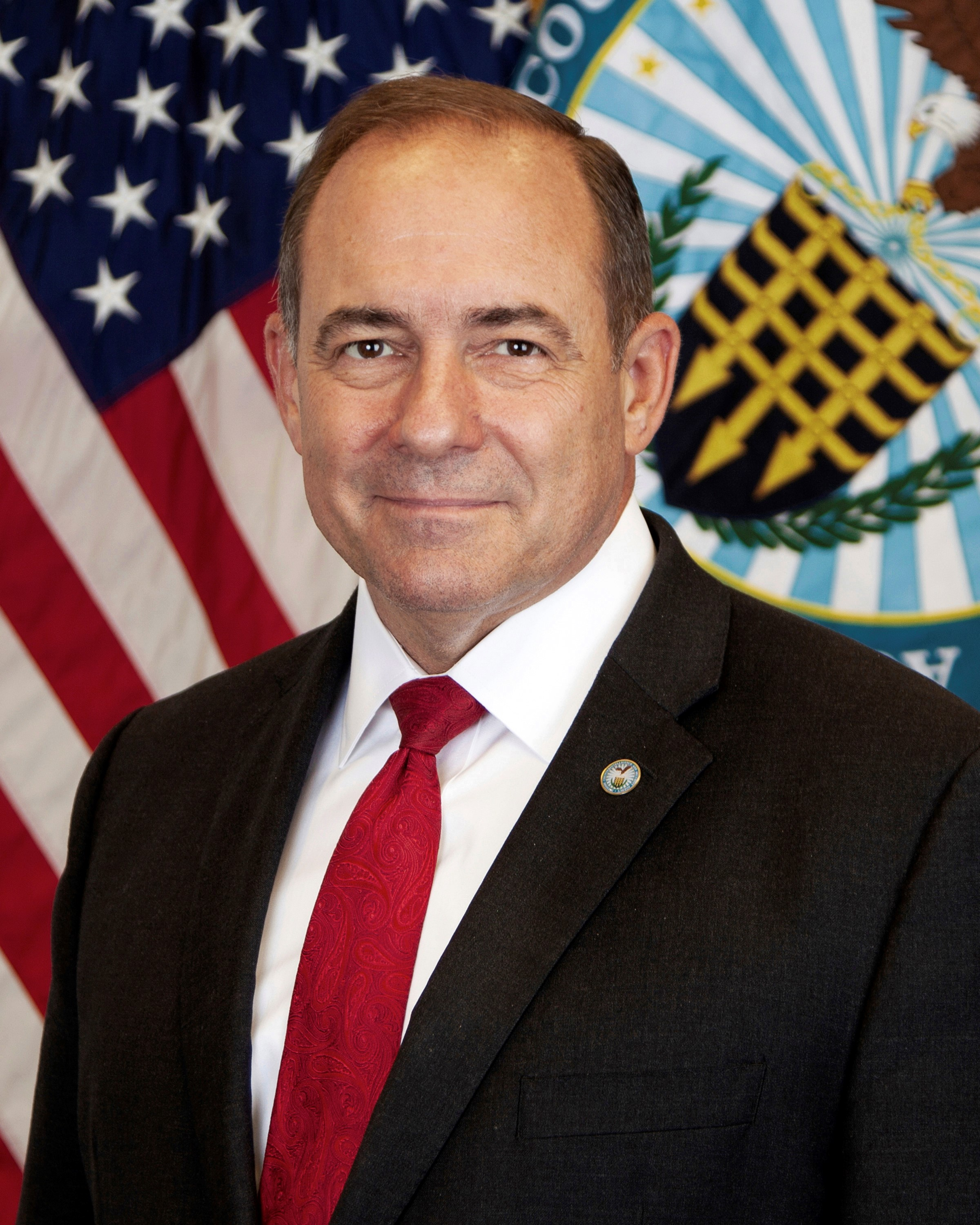
- Official portrait, 2020

Director of the Defense Counterintelligence and Security Agency
- In office March 2020 – October 2023

Deputy Assistant Secretary of Defense for Detainee Policy
- In office February 2010 – August 2013
- President: Barack Obama
- Secretary: Robert Gates; Leon Panetta
- Preceded by: Phil Carter

Personal details
- Education: United States Naval Academy (BS); Yale University (JD)
- Occupation: Military Officer, Attorney

Military service
- Allegiance: United States
- Branch/service: United States Marine Corps
- Years of service: 1983-2010
- Rank: Colonel
- Unit: Judge Advocate General's Corps

William K. Lietzau is an American lawyer, former U.S. Marine Corps judge advocate, and former director of the Defense Counterintelligence and Security Agency.

== Personal life ==
Lietzau grew up in Sudbury, Massachusetts. He graduated from the United States Naval Academy in 1983 and was commissioned as a 2nd lieutenant and infantry officer in the Marine Corps. He later attended Yale Law School (Class of 1989).

He and his wife have two adult children.

== Careers ==
=== Military career ===
After graduating from Yale, Lietzau continued his military service as a Marine Corps judge advocate. Although Marine Corps judge advocates often are assigned to non-legal jobs, Lietzau's service was even more unusual. He began as an infantry officer and commanded a rifle company. He was the first lawyer to command a recruit training battalion, and immediately prior to being assigned to work for the National Security Council, Lietzau was the first judge advocate to command the Marine Corps installation at Henderson Hall (2007–2009).

=== Civilian career ===
Lietzau served in the Obama administration as the deputy assistant secretary of defense (DASD) for rule of law and detainee policy. In this capacity, his official biography said he served as the principal advisor to the United States secretary of defense and the under secretary of defense for policy on matters ranging from creating a principled, credible, and sustainable detention policy for 21st-century warfare, to balancing military and humanitarian interests with respect to specific weapons systems. He guided development of the department's role in rule of law capacity building and was lead for the department in implementing the president's National Action Plan on Women, Peace, and Security. He retired from the Marine Corps as a Colonel with 27 years of service prior to his appointment as DASD.

From April 2009 to February 2010, Lietzau was assigned as Deputy Legal Counsel to the National Security Council at the White House. During that time, he addressed a variety of legal issues dealing with subjects such as international criminal law, counter-narcotics, interdictions, piracy, counterterrorism, weapons of mass destruction, non-proliferation, missile defense, foreign assistance, and treaty implementation. He was asked to serve on the national security staff by then-National Security Advisor General James L. Jones, who had been the commander of U.S. European Command while Lietzau was the staff judge advocate (the first marine lawyer to hold the position) from 2005 to 2007.

Over the course of his military career, Lietzau acquired interagency experience beyond that usually found in the Marine Corps. As deputy legal adviser to the chairman of the Joint Chiefs of Staff and special adviser to the general counsel in the Office of the Secretary of Defense, Lietzau worked in both Democratic and Republican administrations and served on several United States delegations in multilateral treaty negotiations, including those adopting the Terrorist Bombing Convention, the Ottawa Convention banning anti-personnel landmines, the Second Protocol to the Hague Cultural Property Convention, and the Rome Statute for the International Criminal Court. He led the United States negotiating team responsible for defining war crimes for the International Criminal Court in the late 1990s and was called back to work on the crime of aggression, which was negotiated in Kampala in 2010. He taught international law as an adjunct professor at Georgetown University Law Center in the late 1990s.

While in the Marine Corps, he served as the first acting chief prosecutor of the office of military commissions and developed policies and processes for the tribunals envisioned to try those who planned the September 11 attacks in 2001. The military commission regulatory structure Lietzau crafted was adopted, in major part, by the various military commission laws that guide the conduct of commissions in the present day. In March 2014, Lietzau published an op-ed in the Wall Street Journal explaining his long-held positions on U.S. detention policy and the way to close the detention facility at Guantanamo Bay. Lietzau also served in a variety of traditional roles as a marine lawyer, including as prosecutor, defense counsel, military judge, special assistant U.S. attorney, staff attorney, chief of the Law of War Branch for the Department of the Navy's International Law Division, and chief of government appellate attorneys for the Department of the Navy.

Lietzau played a role in a diplomatic controversy in February 2012 when a writ of habeas corpus in the United Kingdom compelled the UK government to seek the return to them of a Pakistani national held by the United States in Afghanistan that the British had apprehended in Basra, Iraq, in 2004. They handed Rahmatullah over to American forces, who transferred him to the Bagram Theater Internment Facility. The UK Supreme Court ruled that his transfer was in violation of international law (see Secretary of State for Foreign and Commonwealth Affairs v Rahmatullah).

On July 14, 2011, US forces accidentally released a secret form used to classify whether captives were an "Enduring Security Threat" to the American Civil Liberties Union. Lietzau explained that the accidental release posed a security threat to the United States as it

could have significant deleterious repercussions with respect to our diplomatic relationships with Afghanistan and various other countries.... EST criteria and determinations are not currently a topic in our sensitive bilateral discussions with other countries... revelation of EST criteria would likely complicate those discussions.

According to the New York Times in an interview in the late Summer of 2012 Lietzau said the United States was "on a trajectory to be able to comply" with an agreement to devolve control of the Bagram Theater Internment Facility to Afghan control by the agreed date of September 9, 2012. The New York Times noted that the Lietzau referred to September 9 as a "milestone", rejecting the word "deadline". It noted Lietzau said the agreement only applied to the captives who were in custody when the agreement was signed, and that the United States was nevertheless going to retain certain selected captives under permanent US control—including all the non-Afghan captives.

Lietzau sent an email to his staff and colleagues in July 2013, letting them know he would step down from his position by September 1. He was offered a more senior policy position in the Pentagon that would have allowed him to retain authority over detention issues generally, but he could not commit to staying in any new job long enough. Lietzau has played a major role in shaping detention policies across two administrations. After the terrorist attacks of September 11, 2001, when he was a uniformed lawyer for the Marine Corps, he served as an adviser in the creation of the first version of President George W. Bush's system of military commissions trials. In the Obama administration, he has been the primary official shaping policies for "law of war" detention at the prison at Guantánamo Bay and Bagram Air Base in Afghanistan.

== Controversy ==
On December 18, 2023, the Department of Defense Office of the Inspector General (DoD OIG) released a report as a result of a two-year investigation into Lietzau. The DoD OIG began the investigation after an anonymous complaint about sexual harassment and inappropriate relationships with subordinates by Lietzau, and found those complaints to be substantiated. The report also covered additional policy violations by Lietzau, such as misusing government resources for political purposes (i.e., violating the Hatch Act), drinking alcohol in the office, and using his staff and office resources to support a religious charity with which he was affiliated.
