= Stimson Lumber Company =

American lumber company

- Type: Private
- Industry: Lumber products, timberland
- Founded: May 9, 1931; 95 years ago, Hillsboro, Oregon, U.S.
- Headquarters: Portland, Oregon, U.S.
- Products: Forest products
- Revenue: 245,000,000 United States dollar (2004)
- Number of employees: 2,000
- Website: www.stimsonlumber.com

Stimson Lumber Company is an American forest products company based in Oregon. Founded in 1931, it was started by three partners, including G. W. Stimson of the Stimson family of King County, Washington, responsible for the Stimson House, Hollywood Farm, and the Colonnade Hotel.

== History ==
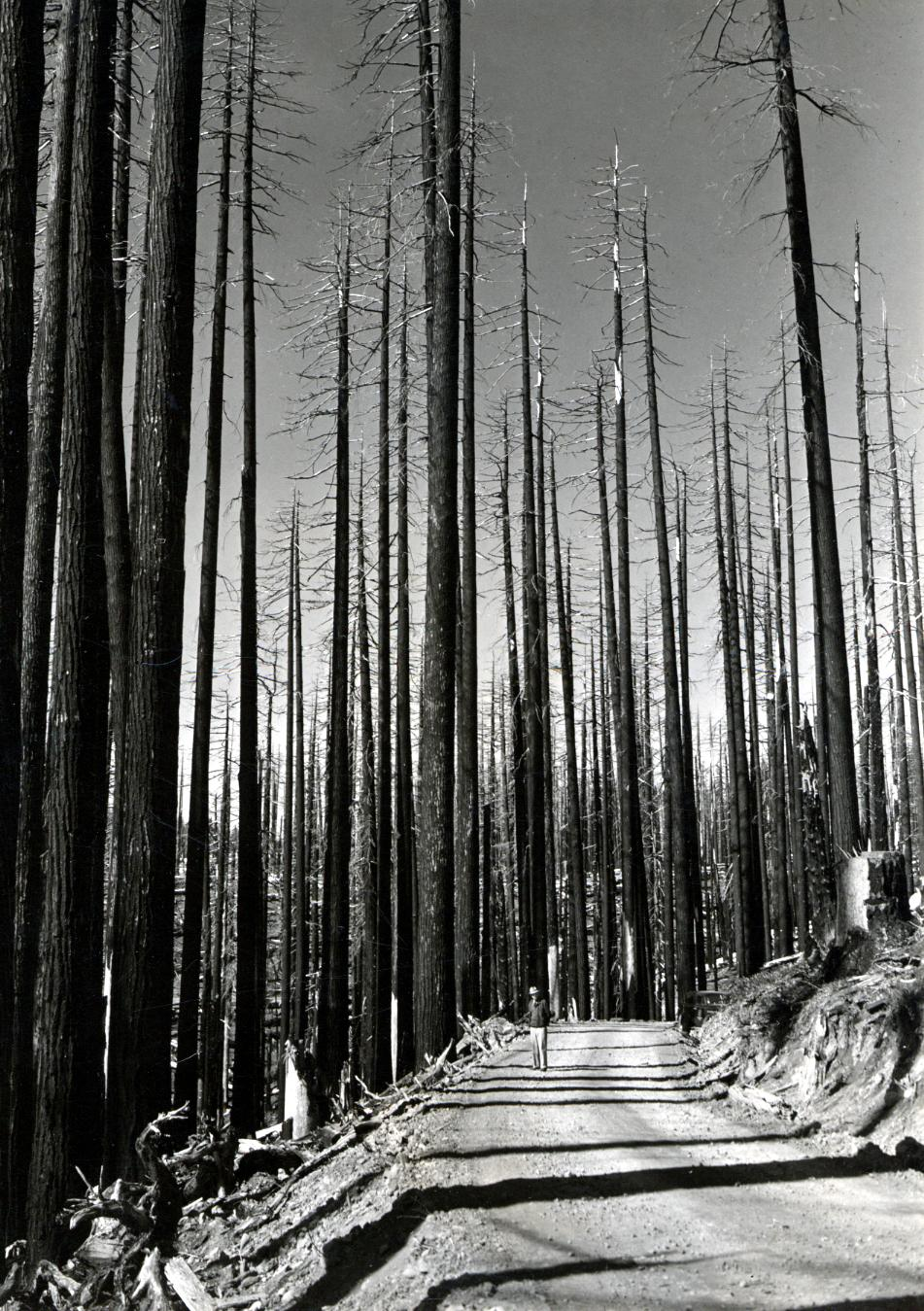
Company's timberlands inside the Tillamook Burn

The company traces its history back to 1850 when Thomas Douglas Stimson started logging in Michigan. After moving west to the Pacific Northwest in the 1880s, the family purchased timberlands across the region and established mills and other businesses in the Puget Sound area. On May 9, 1931, G. W. Stimson of the lumber family of Washington, attorney Thomas H. Tongue, Jr. (son of Congressman Thomas H. Tongue), and Harold A. Miller incorporated the business in Hillsboro, Oregon. Miller was the son-in-law of Stimson, and a founder of the Western Forestry Center in Portland, as well as onetime owner of the Schooner Te Vega. Miller had been asked by Charles S. Stimson to move to Oregon to head family's business in Oregon. Two years later the company opened a new mill in Forest Grove, which remains in operation.

Stimson bought Northwest Petrochemical Company in 1962 in order to use phenol in made in manufacturing hardboard. In 1976, the company bought a plywood plant in Merlin, Oregon. Longtime leader Miller died in 1981, with Darrell Schroeder becoming the new company executive.

In 1987, the company donated the log used to create the Chief Kno-Tah sculpture in Shute Park in Hillsboro. The company sold a property to Metro in 2008 in the Chehalem Mountains that was turned into Chehalem Ridge Nature Park. In 2020, the company's mill at Gaston was fined for air pollution. The Christmas tree for Pioneer Courthouse Square in Portland is often donated by the company, including in 2021 and 2022.

== Operations ==
The company operates a total of seven mills combined between Idaho and Oregon. Stimson owns 552,000 acres (223,000 hectares) of timberland across three states: Oregon, Idaho, and Montana. This makes the company the twentieth largest landowner in the United States.

== See also ==
- McArthur Lake Wildlife Corridor
