= Stimson House =

Historic house in California, United States

- U.S. National Register of Historic Places
- Los Angeles Historic-Cultural Monument
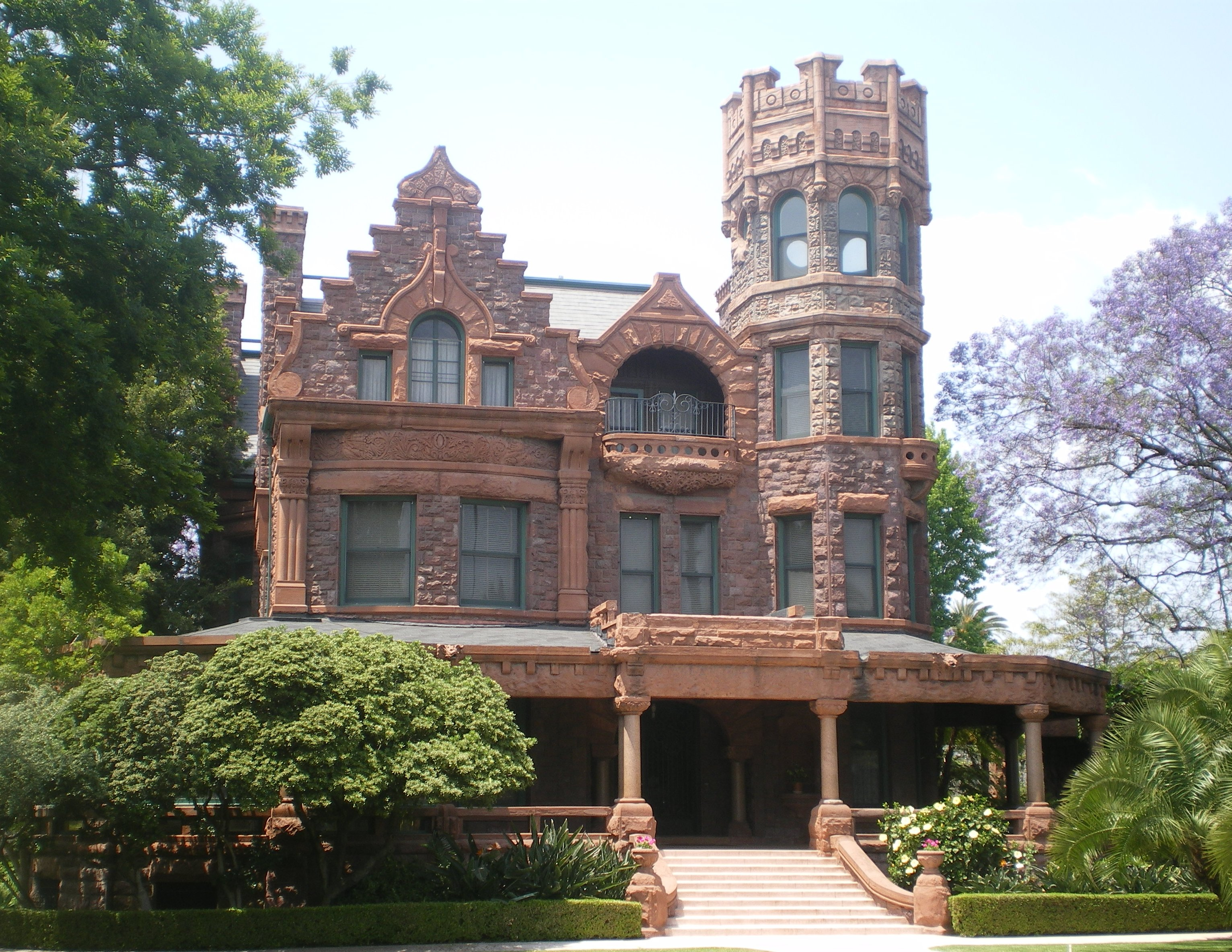
- Stimson House, 2008

- Location within the Los Angeles metropolitan area Location within California Location within the United States
- Location: 2421 S Figueroa Street; Los Angeles, California
- Coordinates: 34°1′47″N 118°16′33″W
- Built: 1891
- Architect: Carroll H. Brown, E.D. Elliot
- Architectural style: Richardsonian Romanesque, Gothic Revival
- NRHP reference No.: 78000690
- LAHCM No.: 212

Significant dates
- Added to NRHP: March 30, 1978
- Designated LAHCM: May 16, 1979

Stimson House is a Richardsonian Romanesque mansion in the University Park neighborhood of Los Angeles. Built in 1891, it was the home of lumber and banking millionaire Thomas Douglas Stimson. During Stimson's lifetime, the house survived a dynamite attack by a blackmailer in 1896. After Stimson's death, the house has been occupied by a brewer who reportedly stored wines and other spirits in the basement, a fraternity house that conducted noisy parties (causing consternation among occupants of neighboring mansions), as student housing for Mount St. Mary's College, and as a convent for the Sisters of St. Joseph of Carondelet.

== Architecture ==
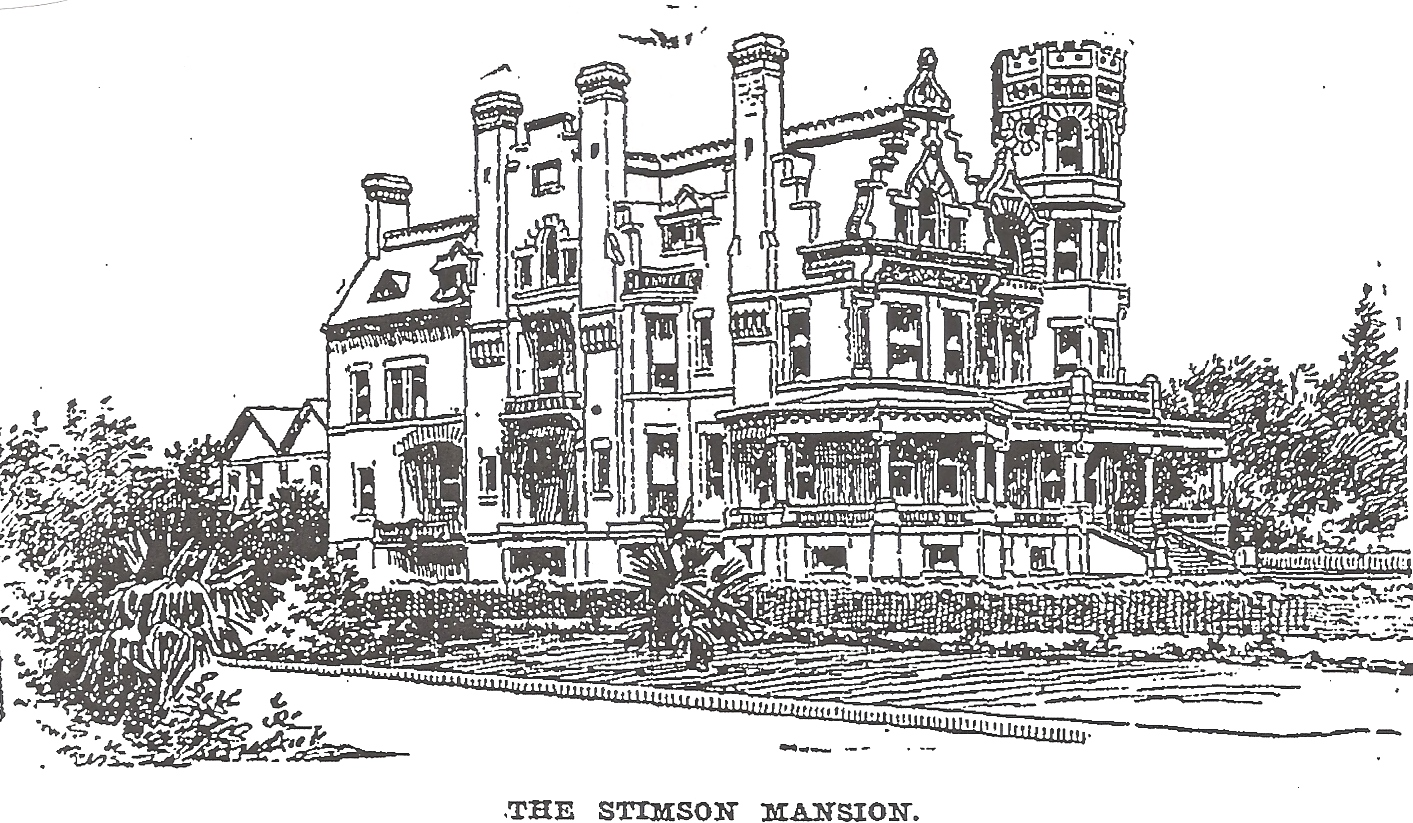
Drawing of Stimson House from Los Angeles Times, 1896

When Stimson House was built in the 1890s, the Los Angeles Times described it as "the costliest and most beautiful private residence in Los Angeles," a building "admired by all who see it." More than a hundred years later, the Times said: "From the front, the 3 1/2-story house resembles a medieval castle, with brick chimneys standing guard like sentries along the roof and an ornate four-story crenelated tower on the northeast corner, a noble rook from a massive chess board." With its $150,000 cost, it was the most expensive house that had been built in Los Angeles at the time.

From the day it was built, the 30-room house was a Los Angeles landmark. Neighbors and occupants have referred to it over the years as "the Castle" or the "Red Castle" due to its turret-top walls, four-story tower, and red-stone exterior.

=== Exterior features ===
The original occupant, Thomas Douglas Stimson, hired architect H. Carroll Brown, then only 27 years old, to design his new home. Stimson designed the home principally in the Richardsonian Romanesque style, with rough-hewn stone, round headed arches, short columns, rows of arched or rectangular windows and an overall fortress quality. The Richardsonian style was popular in the Upper Midwest in the 1880s, though the style never became popular in Los Angeles. Stimson reportedly wanted his new home to resemble the brick-and-stone mansions of Chicago's Gold Coast, including the Palmer Mansion. A Los Angeles Times music critic reviewing a chamber music performance at the house in 1989 called its architecture "Midwestern Ivanhoe." With its Gothic tower and other features, the style of the house is not strictly Richardsonian. A Times writer in 1948 noted that the house presents a "puzzling" appearance: "Its architecture reflects the Mission influence, a bit of Byzantine, something Latin and a little Fort Ticonderoga."

Brown obtained the distinctive red stones from a quarry in New Mexico and used San Fernando sandstone for the windows, balconies and the tower's crown trim. The most prominent feature on the house is the four-story Gothic tower. The top of the tower and ridges are crenellated and finished with notched battlements. Other important features include a third floor balcony with a gabled arch and a stepped gable with a Palladian window. A porch with carved stone columns surrounds the first floor.

The neighborhood in which the Stimson House was built became known as "Millionaires Row" in the 1890s, though the size and stone construction of Stimson House set it apart from the wood houses along Millionaires Row.

=== Interior features ===
Some have noted the "irony" in a lumber baron's home being built of stone rather than wood. However, the interior has been described as "a shrine to lumber, a museum of wood, a smorgasbord of timber—ash, sycamore, birch, mahogany, walnut, gumwood and oak, all shipped from lumber yards in the Midwest." Each room on the first floor is furnished with a different type of wood, and the heavy doors have double thickness, to match the wood of the room on either side. An intricate parquet border is found at the edge of the oak floors throughout the house.

Under the first floor there is a basement, "a maze of rooms and arched doorways." There was a room that at one time served as an underground lounge and bar. In another recess there was a wine cellar equipped with an iron door that served as a makeshift jail cell and the scene of many pranks during the house's later years as a fraternity house. There were also traces of organ pipes that once were installed there.

The interior features also included a Diebold safe hidden behind a door in Stimson's study. The nuns who occupied the house in later years reportedly stored their cleaning supplies in the safe. Stimson reportedly took photographs of his Chicago mansion and hired Carsley and East Manufacturing Co. to duplicate them and ship the finished products to Los Angeles.

== History ==
=== Thomas Douglas Stimson ===
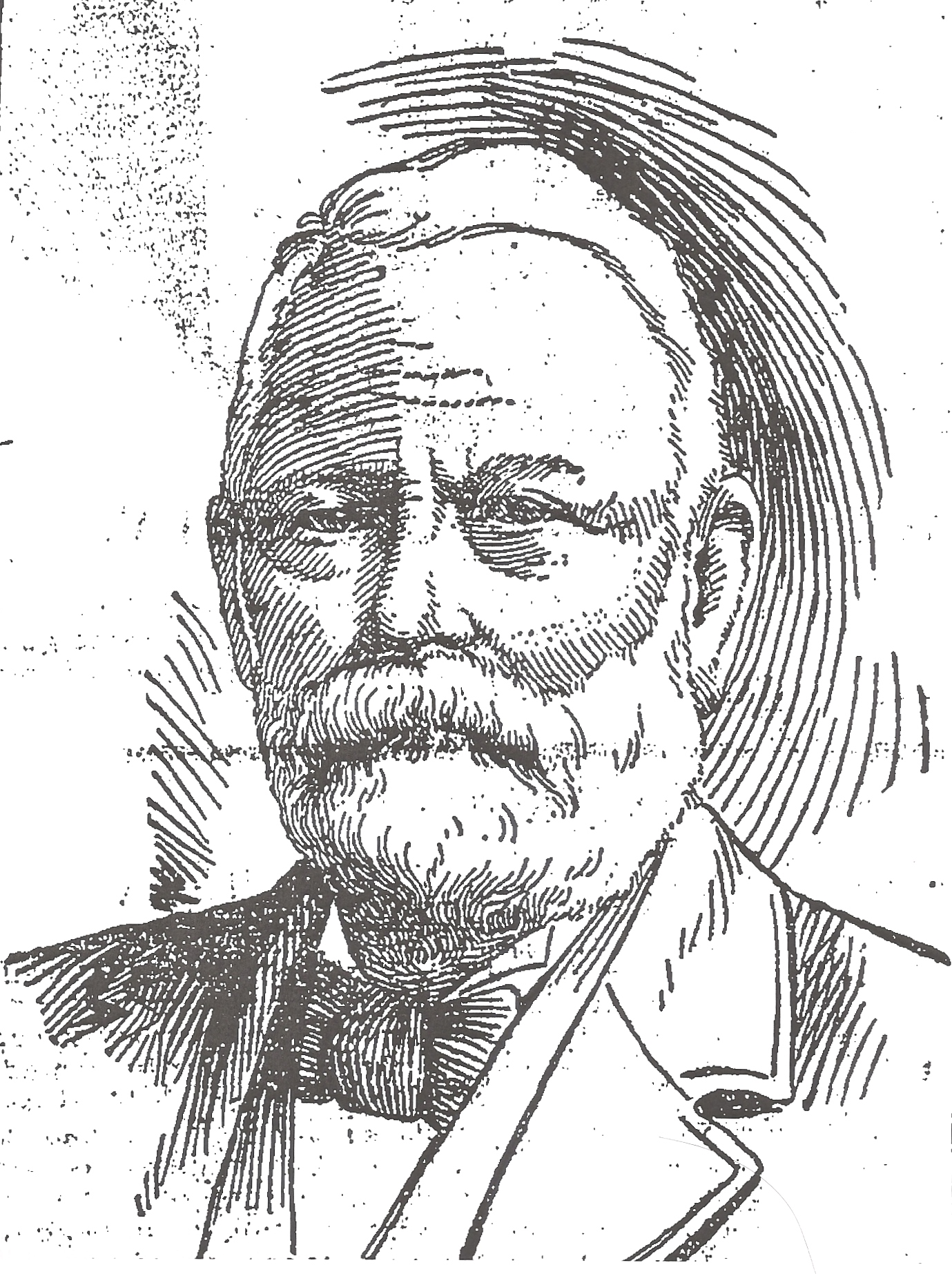
Thomas Douglas Stimson

Thomas Douglas Stimson (1828–1898) was one of the wealthiest men in Los Angeles. He was known as a self-made man who left his home in Canada at age 14, and worked as a trader in Michigan. He later moved to Chicago where he built a successful lumber business. In 1890, he moved to Los Angeles at age 63, seeking a more pleasant and healthful climate for his retirement. However, rather than retiring, Stimson became one of the most active members of the Los Angeles business community. He became one of the largest shareholders in the Citizens Banks and was vice president of the Los Angeles Chamber of Commerce.

In 1893, Stimson used the same architect who had built Stimson House (H. Carroll Brown) to build the Stimson Block, a six-story office building at the corner of Third and Spring streets downtown. The Stimson Block used many of the same architectural features employed in Stimson House, and when it opened in 1893, the Stimson Block was the tallest building in Los Angeles. The Stimson Block was demolished in 1963 to make room for a parking lot.

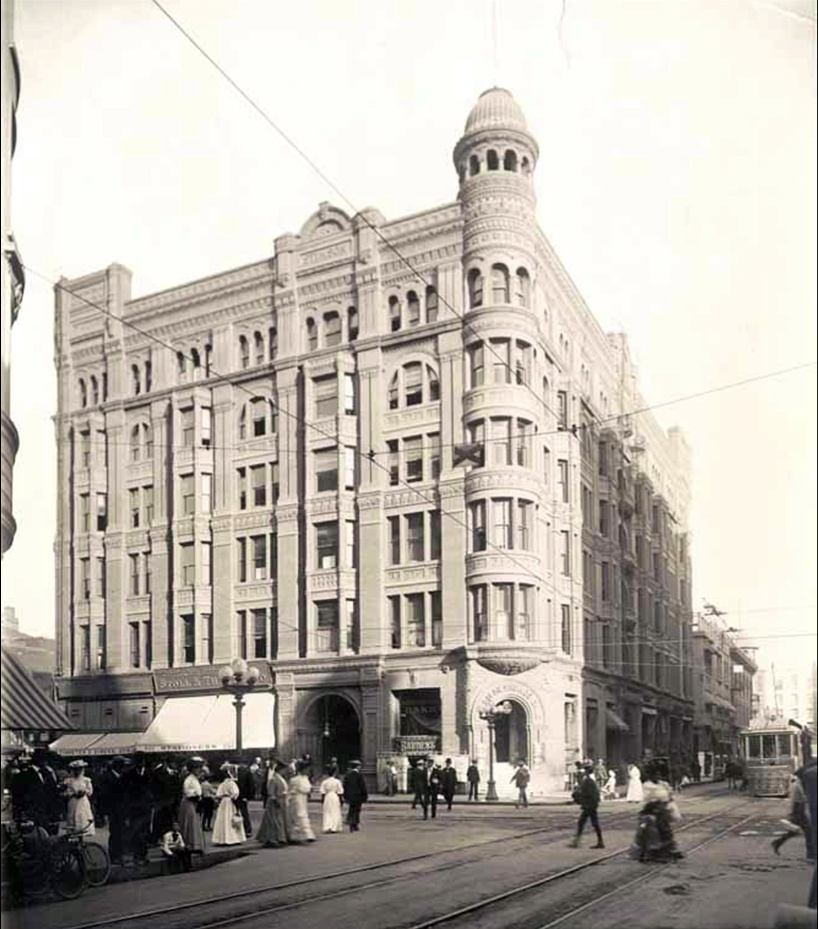
Stimson Block, NE corner 3rd/Spring (1893–1963), once the tallest building in Los Angeles

Stimson died at Stimson House in February 1898. His widow, Achsah, lived in the house until she died in 1904.

Stimson's son Charles D. Stimson followed his father into the timber industry and was the patriarch of the Seattle-area Stimson family whose other members have included Dorothy Stimson Bullitt and the conservative pundit Charles "Cully" D. Stimson. The Seattle scion also built a notable home, the Stimson-Green mansion on First Hill, and another descendant built a notable house in Capitol Hill's Harvard-Belmont Landmark District on the site of Horace C. Henry's former mansion.

=== "Dynamite Fiends" ===
In February 1896, the Stimson House was the target of a bizarre bombing attack. The headline in the Los Angeles Times read, "DYNAMITE FIENDS: An Attempt to Blow Up the Stimson Mansion; The Redstone Walls Resisted the Terrific Explosion." A "stick of giant powder" was placed against the foundation of the house, directly under Stimson's bedroom. A large hole was torn in the side of the house by the explosion, but the thick foundation wall was not damaged. Reports indicated that a frame house would have been shattered into fragments by the explosion, but the solid stone structure withstood the blast. Two neighbors witnessed the culprit lighting the fire on the dynamite, grabbed their guns, ran across the lawn, and were thrown off their feet by the explosion. On regaining their balance, the neighbors saw a man running away from the scene and fired several shots in his direction, but the man escaped.

Initially, there was suspicion that "the plot to blow up the house" was either a robbery attempt or the "dastardly" act of "some Anarchist or enemy of capitalists who took this cowardly method of expressing his hatred for men of wealth, and singled out a man who is reputed to be one of the wealthiest in Los Angeles, and who lives sumptuously as becomes his station."

Later that month, private detective Harry Coyne was arrested for the attack. Stimson testified at the preliminary hearing that he had hired Coyne to accompany his son to Mexico the prior month. Shortly after returning from Mexico, Coyne told Stimson that he was in danger from the machinations of a notorious Mexican criminal. Coyne offered his services to help foil the attack. Over a period of time, Coyne advised Stimson that the criminal had been attempting to break into the house, and sought to verify his claim with the discovery of tools and marks on a window. Coyne also claimed that the criminal had poisoned Stimson's dog, after which the Stimson family dog became sick. After the explosion, Coyne told Stimson that the trouble was still not over, that he was in constant danger of being shot or stabbed and that the crooks had eleven sticks of dynamite remaining that would be used for another attack on the house. Coyne suggested that the only way to stop the culprits was to kill them, and he offered his services to take care of the matter. Stimson confronted Coyne and told him he suspected the affair to be a blackmailing scheme by Coyne himself. Coyne's minute information as to the supposed crooks' plans and actions betrayed his role in the crime, and he was eventually convicted and sentenced to five years at Folsom Prison.

=== Edward Maier ===
After Stimson's wife died in 1904, the house was purchased by a civil engineer named Alfred Solano. In 1918, Edward R. Maier, sportsman and owner of Maier Brewing Co., bought the house, and it served as the Maier family home until 1940. Maier was said to have stored his wines and liqueurs in the labyrinthine basement.

=== Fraternity imprisonments and assaults ===
In 1940, the Maier family sold the house to USC's Pi Kappa Alpha fraternity for $20,000—about 13% of the original cost of construction. In their first year of occupancy, the Pi Kappa Alpha fraternity put Stimson House at the center of a near riot among USC students. Members of a UCLA fraternity prematurely set the traditional USC bonfire ablaze early in the morning before the scheduled event. Two of the UCLA students were captured by members of the USC fraternity and returned to Stimson House. In response to the acts of the UCLA students, 800 Trojans set fires in the streets with makeshift piles of sticks, boxes, crates, wooden benches and anything else that would burn. When firemen arrived, a "solid wall of undergraduates" blocked their access to the nearest fireplug. Firemen doused the students with their fire hoses, and police unsheathed their billy clubs to avert a riot. Two hours later, the two captured UCLA students were displayed to reporters "imprisoned in the 'catacombs'" of Stimson House. The two young men had been stripped of their clothing, their bodies smeared with black paint, and on the chest of each was written the letters "S.C." Their heads had also been shaved, leaving only a topknot with a circle of black paint creating the appearance of an Iroquois Indian. Both had been spanked until sitting was uncomfortable, and the two were "guarded in their cell by more than 100 husky Trojans." One of the captured UCLA students was the son of Los Angeles Police Chief Hohmann who said, "Bob (his son) got himself into this, and he'll have to take his medicine."

In 1996, the Pi Kappa Alphas held a reunion at Stimson house, which they had referred to as the "Red Castle." They found the iron-gated wine cellar just as it was when errant pledges (and UCLA prisoners) were locked inside and sprayed with a hose. Memories flowed as the fraternity brothers gathered at the house, one recalling his proposal to his wife on the stairs of the house, and another recalling pelting a pledge with eggs from the same staircase, only to discover that the pledge was allergic to eggs—paramedics had to be called when his eyes swelled closed. One of the returning fraternity members recalled that, as a pledge, he crawled through an air shaft to escape from the catacombs and, covered with soot, appeared at the door of a neighbor asking if he might use the phone—the neighbor being Mrs. Doheny, who later bought Stimson House to rid herself of the Pi Kappa Alphas.

=== Convent for Sisters of St. Joseph ===
The property behind Stimson House (on Chester Place) was the home of Carrie Estelle Doheny, the widow of wealthy oil man Edward L. Doheny. Mrs. Doheny had grown up in the neighborhood and had watched as the Stimson House was built. She recalled, "I remember when Mr. Stimson was building this house. When I was just a little girl, my father would take me for a walk on Sunday afternoons, and we'd always walk this way to see how far along the work had progressed." For eight years from 1940 to 1948, Mrs. Doheny lived behind the fraternity, and the boisterous parties in the house's dungeon-like "catacombs" were an ongoing source of annoyance. Mrs. Doheny repeatedly complained to the university president, Rufus B. Von Kleinsmid, about disturbances, a former house president recalling that he was called before Kleinsmid "once a month or so" as a result of her complaints. By 1948, Mrs. Doheny had dealt with the fraternity for long enough and offered $75,000 to purchase the house that the fraternity had bought eight years earlier for $20,000. The fraternity house was already struggling with the cost of maintaining the large house and accepted Mrs. Doheny's offer. After the sale closed, Mrs. Doheny assured herself that she would have no further problems with noisy neighbors by deeding Stimson House to the Sisters of St. Joseph of Carondelet for use as a convent. At the time, the Los Angeles Times noted: "The parlor where merry parties reveled at the turn of the century will become a chapel where reverent nuns will now bow in humble devotion. The gay conversation of the festive past will yield place to solemn intonations of morning prayers."

When the fraternity brothers gathered for their reunion in 1996, the Los Angeles Times noted: "What a difference half a century makes. The Sisters of St. Joseph of Carondolet now say their prayers in those wood-paneled rooms where the PiKAs sang: 'He rambled down to Hades, To see the poor lost souls, Saw a bunch of Kappa Sigs a-roasting on the coals....'"

The Sisters of St. Joseph operated the house as a convent from 1948 to 1969. From 1969 to 1993, the house was converted to use as housing for students at Mount St. Mary's College. In the fall of 1993, the sisters returned to Stimson House and resumed using it as a convent.

=== Earthquake damage ===
Stimson House suffered substantial damage in the 1994 Northridge earthquake. The roof had to be removed after bricks fell through it, and the chimney, parapets and tower were also damaged. The Sisters of St. Joseph had reoccupied the house as a convent in the fall of 1993, but were forced to vacate the property for ten months while repairs were made.

== Designation as historic building ==
The Stimson House was listed on the National Register of Historic Places in 1978 and has also been named a Historic-Cultural Monument (# 212) by the City of Los Angeles. Material prepared for the Los Angeles Cultural Heritage Commission's review of the Stimson house in 1977 called it "architecturally unique in Los Angeles," "the best example of this period of American architecture in Los Angeles" and "one of the most significant structures in the Los Angeles area."

== Use as a filming location ==
The house has been used as a shooting location in numerous commercials, television shows, and feature films, including:

- It appeared in the films Another You, House II, Casper Meets Wendy and After Midnight.
- It appeared in the miniseries Captains and the Kings and Testimony of Two Men.
- It appeared in an episode of The Bionic Woman in which Lindsay Wagner's double jumped off a second-floor porch. Vincent Price, who appeared in the episode, liked the spooky acoustics of the house and recorded some of his later productions there.
- It was used as the orphanage in the 1994 comedy film Clifford.
- It appeared in an episode of Pushing Daisies as a mortuary.
- The exterior was used during the fifth, sixth, and seventh seasons of Mad Men as the home for the Francis family.
- It appeared in the third episode of the third season of the TV show Legion, as an early version of the Xavier Mansion and the childhood home of David Haller (Dan Stevens).
- It appeared in "Aunt Ida's 90th Birthday", the third episode of the first season of the TV show Rutherford Falls.
- The 2021 horror film The Manor was filmed at the Stimson House.
- The horror film Death, PhD was filmed at the Stimson House.
- High Potential Season 2, Episode 6 was filmed at the Stimson House.

== See also ==
- List of Registered Historic Places in Los Angeles
- List of Los Angeles Historic-Cultural Monuments in South Los Angeles
- North American fraternity and sorority housing
