= Matthew Waxman =

American law professor

Matt Waxman
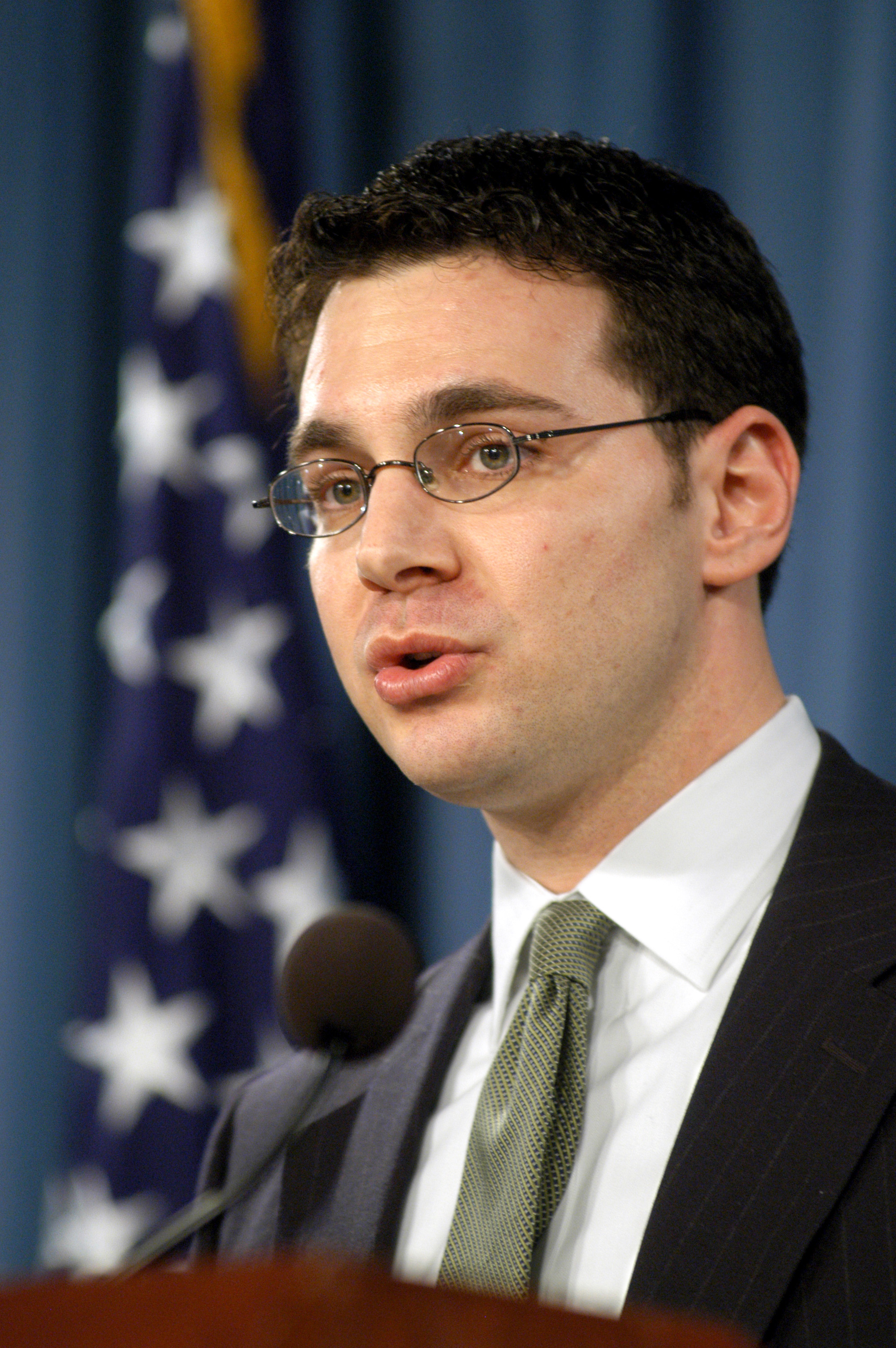

Deputy Assistant Secretary of Defense for Detainee Affairs
- In office 2004–2005

Personal details
- Born: Matthew Curtis Waxman; 1971 or 1972 (age 53–54)
- Party: Republican
- Education: Yale University (BA, JD)

Matthew Curtis Waxman (born 1971/1972) is an American law professor at Columbia University and author who held several positions during the George W. Bush administration. He is also currently a fellow at the Hoover Institution on War, Revolution and Peace.

== Education ==
Waxman is a graduate of Yale College summa cum laude, where he studied political science and international studies, and Yale Law School. He served as law clerk to Supreme Court justice David H. Souter and U.S. Court of Appeals judge Joel M. Flaum and is a member and international affairs fellow of the Council on Foreign Relations. He was a Fulbright Scholar at King's College London, where he studied military history.

== Government service ==
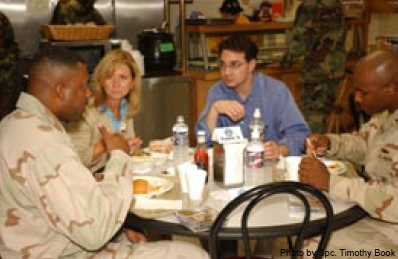
Rep. Marsha Blackburn (R-Tenn.) and Matthew Waxman, DASD-DA

Waxman was described as working within the Bush administration, unsuccessfully, to have U.S. captives treated in accordance with the Geneva Conventions. Waxman served under Condoleezza Rice in the National Security Council in 2001-2003. He served as the first Deputy Assistant Secretary of Defense for Detainee Affairs in 2004 and 2005. Waxman moved from the Department of Defense to the Department of State in December 2005, serving there under Secretary of State Condoleezza Rice until 2007.

== Later career ==
Waxman accepted a position as a Professor of Law at Columbia Law School in 2007. Waxman currently serves as the Liviu Librescu Professor of Law and faculty chair of the Roger Hertog Program on Law and National Security.

On August 28, 2010, Waxman was quoted by Charlie Savage on the front page of the New York Times criticizing the Barack Obama Presidency for choosing to prosecute Canadian Omar Khadr who was only 15 years old when he was captured.

In early 2012, as the Obama administration prepared to try Khalid Sheikh Mohammed at Guantanamo Bay detention camp, Waxman said on NPR it would "be a big year for military commissions. ... [T]he Obama administration [is] taking ownership of military commissions .... They are basically saying: We've corrected the problems of the Bush administration, and we're now going to use this as a tool in combating terrorism .... There are a lot of doubters out there who see military justice and the military commission system as tainted or illegitimate .... The Obama administration wants to turn around that perception."

In 2020, Waxman, along with over 130 other former Republican national security officials, signed a statement that asserted that President Trump was unfit to serve another term, and "To that end, we are firmly convinced that it is in the best interest of our nation that Vice President Joe Biden be elected as the next President of the United States, and we will vote for him."

== Personal ==
Waxman is a son of Merle Waxman and Dr. Stephen G. Waxman. His parents were both employed at Yale Medical School, his mother as an administrator and his father as a neurologist. Waxman married Wendy Katz, a graduate of Columbia and Bank Street College who had worked for Hillary Clinton and Andrew M. Cuomo, in 2009. She is a daughter of the late Rosalie Katz and the late Daniel P. Katz. Her mother was with Downtown Realty Management in Great Neck, New York and her father was a senior executive with Kinney System.

== Publications ==
- Daniel Byman, Matthew C. Waxman (2000). Confronting Iraq: U.S. policy and the use of force since the Gulf War. Rand Corporation. ISBN 978-0-8330-2813-6. "Matthew Waxman."
- Daniel Byman, Matthew Waxman (2002). The dynamics of coercion: American foreign policy and the limits of military might. Cambridge University Press. ISBN 978-0-521-00780-1.
- Matthew Waxman (2005-08-20). "Beyond Guantanamo". Washington Post. p. A17.
- Matthew Waxman (2007-10-28). "The Smart Way to Shut Gitmo Down". Washington Post. p. B04.
- Matthew Waxman (2008-11-08). "Reponse by Professor Matthew Waxman, "International Standards for Detaining Terrorism Suspects: Moving Beyond the Armed Conflict-Criminal Divide."". Opinio Juris.
- Matthew Waxman (2009-01-21). "Closing Guantanamo is way harder than you think". Foreign Policy. Archived from the original on 2009-04-28.

== See also ==
- List of law clerks for the third seat of the Supreme Court of the United States
