= Hollywood Farm =

- U.S. National Register of Historic Places
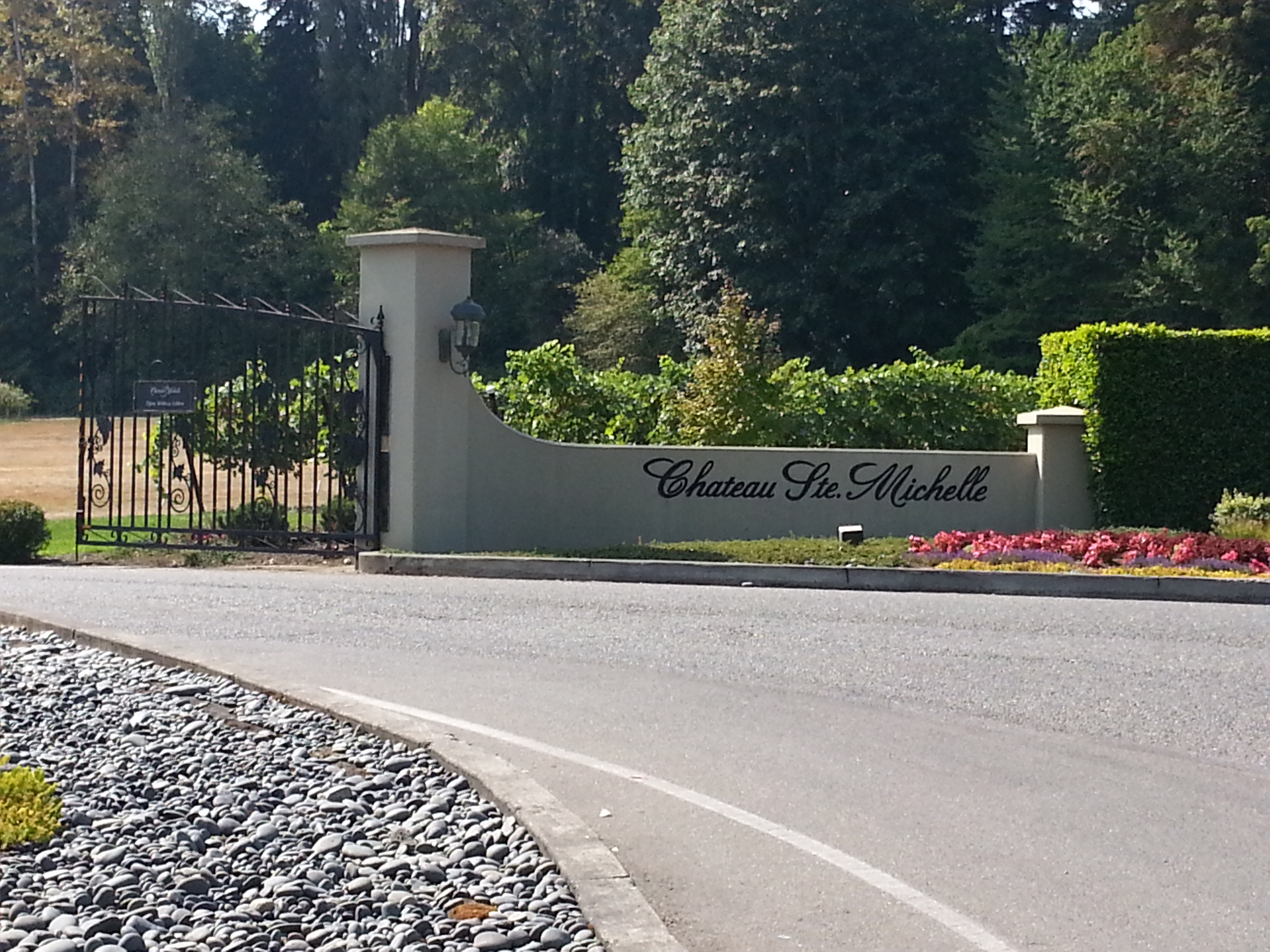
- Hollywood Farm

- Location within Washington (state) Location within the United States
- Nearest city: Woodinville, Washington
- Coordinates: 47°43′48″N 122°08′59″W
- Area: 5.7 acres (2.3 ha)
- Built: 1910
- Architectural style: Bungalow/craftsman
- NRHP reference No.: 78002757
- Added to NRHP: December 15, 1978

Hollywood Farm was a 206-acre dairy farm in the Sammamish Valley, approximately 25 miles northeast of Seattle. It was built in 1910 and added to the National Register of Historic Places in 1978. The property is now occupied by the Chateau Ste. Michelle Winery.

The Craftsman house was a 1 1/2 story frame structure with a concrete foundation and full basement, approximately 75' by 60'. The property also included a carriage house, separate caretaker's residence, and greenhouses. Several acres surrounding the main residence were elaborately landscaped by the Olmsted Brothers firm.

== History ==
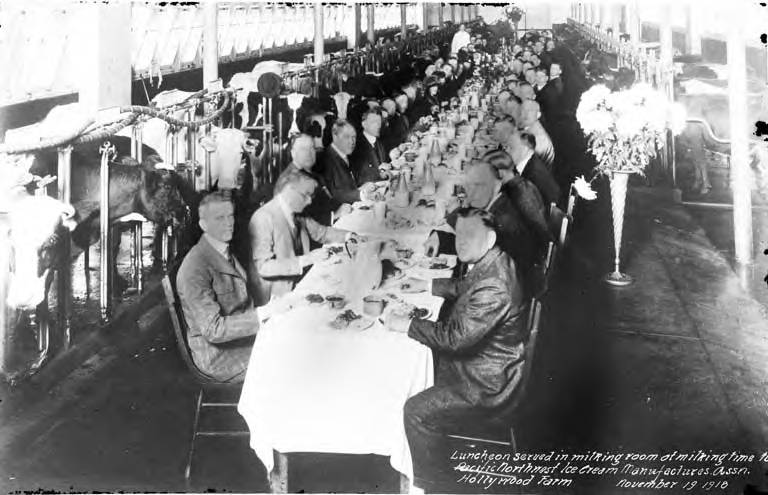
Luncheon in the milking room of Hollywood Farm, November 19, 1918

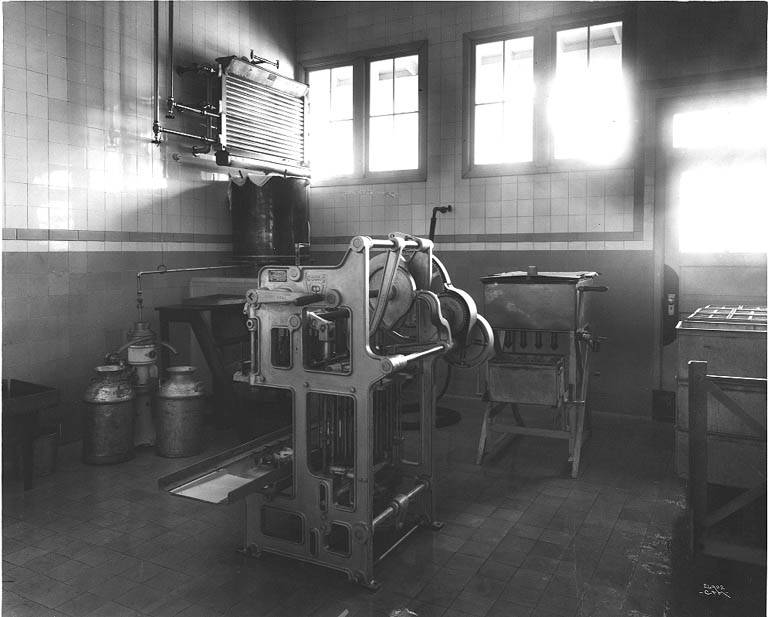
Hollywood Farm milk bottling department

Frederick Spencer Stimson, of the Stimson Lumber Company, built the home as a weekend and summer retreat for his family. He also established a dairy farm with purebred Holstein-Friesian dairy cattle, intended as a demonstration of modern agricultural practices, and eventually expanded the property to 600 acres. The state-of-the-art operations included laboratory testing for contaminants and measuring butterfat content, as well as strict sanitation controls.

His wife, Nellie, managed the gardens and nine greenhouses, and was known for her carnations and roses. Enterprises associated with the property included Hollywood Gardens and Hollywood Poultry Farm. A railroad spur was built to an ice cream parlor on the farm, where passengers could purchase ice cream, eggs, butter, cream, and sausages.

The Stimson family moved permanently to Hollywood Farm in 1918, on the advice of Frederick's physician. Frederick and his wife Nellie sponsored "Hollywood Fresh Air Farm", a two-week program for undernourished children from the city, allowing them to enjoy the country air and fresh dairy foods.

Hollywood Farm was sold to the Macbride family in 1944, who restored the gardens and main residence, which had fallen into disrepair, and added a greenhouse. The Macbrides raised beef cows and exotic birds. Ste. Michelle Vintners, Inc. purchased the property in 1975.
