= Colonnade Hotel (Seattle) =

- U.S. National Register of Historic Places
- Seattle Landmark
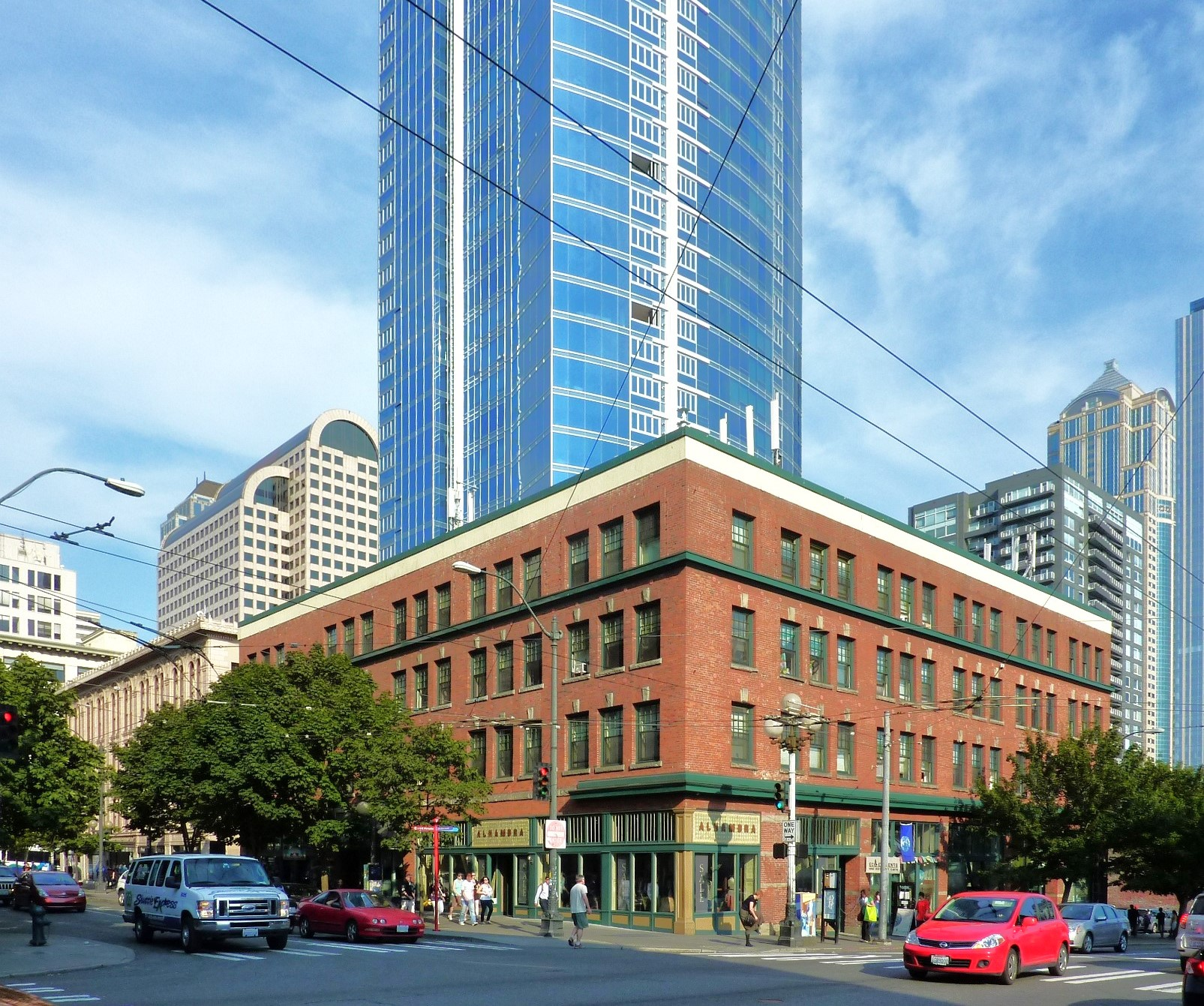
- The Colonnade Hotel, 2013

- Location within Downtown Seattle
- Location: 107 Pine St., Seattle, Washington
- Coordinates: 47°36′35″N 122°20′26″W
- Built: 1900
- Architect: Charles Bebb
- Architectural style: Commercial Vernacular
- NRHP reference No.: 100001443

Significant dates
- Added to NRHP: August 7, 2007
- Designated SEATL: June 7, 2017

The Colonnade Hotel first known as the Stimson Block then later the Standard Hotel, Gateway Hotel and Gatewood Hotel is a historic hotel building in Seattle, Washington located at the Southeast corner of 1st Avenue and Pine Streets in the city's central business district. One of the earliest extant solo projects of architect Charles Bebb, it was built in 1900 by Charles and Fred Stimson, owners of the Stimson lumber mill at Ballard, for use as a hotel. It served that purpose under its various names until the early 1980s and after a brief vacancy was restored into low-income housing by the Plymouth Housing Group. Once owned by the Samis Foundation, it was sold to various LLC owners who would convert it back into a hotel in 2017, currently operating under the name Palihotel. It was added to the National Register of Historic Places on August 7, 2007 and became a City of Seattle Landmark in 2017.

== History ==
In January 1900, the Stimson Brothers, Charles and Fred, commissioned architect Charles H. Bebb to design a 3-story hotel building for their mostly vacant 120'x120' property at the Southeast corner of First Avenue and Pine Street. The building was reported to cost $30,000 (About $946,000 in 2020). The permit was issued on February 9 with Matthew Dow being awarded the general contract and by May the building was up 2 floors. Only 1 month later it was announced that a 4th floor was being added to the still unfinished building for an additional $8,000 ($95,000). The completed building opened in December 1900 as the Colonnade Hotel, with E.J. Hickey as proprietor. The hotel's lease and all its furnishings and fixtures was sold at public auction on May 6, 1905 though the building itself remained under the ownership of the C.D. Stimson Company.

Originally located at the southern edge of Denny Hill, the building was only minorly affected by the regrades beginning in 1908; the slope of Pine Street once met the building's second floor at its northeast corner and the exposed stone wall now visible in the alleyway was once underground. In 1911 the Colonnade was renamed the Standard Hotel. In 1912 the widening of Pine Street necessitated the demolition and reconstruction of the building's North wall, resulting in the loss of 7 feet of the building's width and the removal of a pair of windows from each floor of the First Avenue façade, resulting in the current asymmetrical appearance. Architect James H. Schack oversaw the reconstruction. It was known as the Gateway Hotel from 1922 to 1932, then the Gatewood Hotel until its closure in 1982 after which the upper floors remained vacant until the building was purchased by the Plymouth Housing Group in the early 1990s. They completely renovated the building inside and out for use as low-income housing during which time it was known as the Gatewood Apartments. In 2001 the building was sold by the Samis Foundation to the Gatewood Apartments LLC who would in turn sell the building to the 101 Pine Street LLC that who would nominate the building for Seattle Landmark status and refurbish it to once again serve as a hotel dubbed Palihotel, that chain's first location out of California.

== See also ==
- List of Seattle landmarks
- National Register of Historic Places listings in Seattle
