= Chehalem Mountains =

Mountain range in Oregon, United States

Chehalem Range
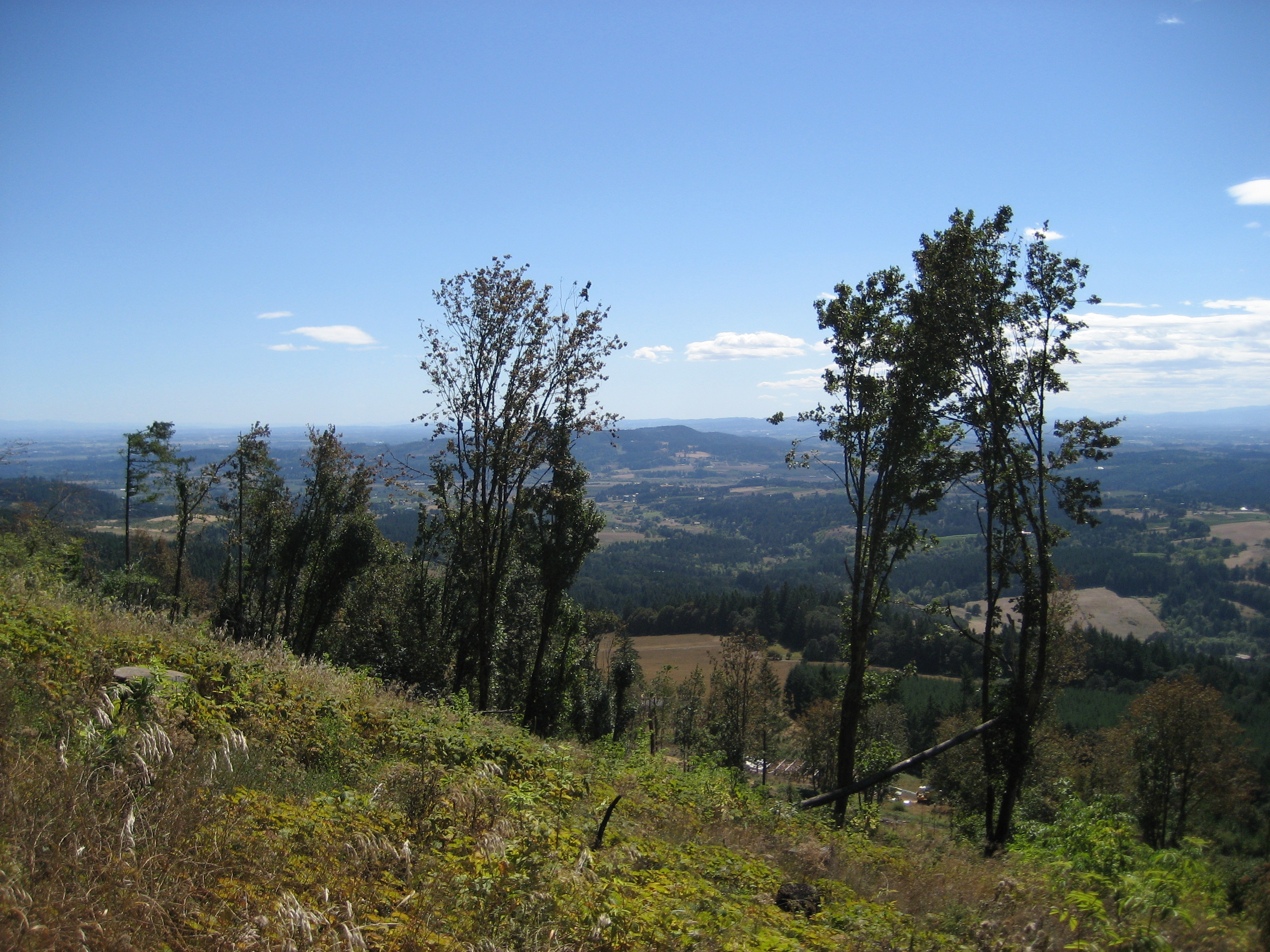
- Southeast from Bald Peak.

Highest point
- Peak: Bald Peak
- Elevation: 1,629 ft (497 m)
- Coordinates: 45°23′46″N 123°03′18″W

Geography
- Country: United States
- State: Oregon
- Borders on: Oregon Coast Range

The Chehalem Mountains are a mountain range located in the Willamette Valley in the U.S. state of Oregon. Forming the southern boundary of the Tualatin Valley, the Chehalems are the highest mountains in the Willamette Valley. The range extends from the Willamette River east of Newberg northwest to the foothills of the Oregon Coast Range south of Forest Grove.

== Toponymy ==
The word "Chehalem" is a corruption of the Atfalati Indian word "Chahelim," a name given in 1877 to one of the bands of Atfalati.

== Geography ==
Composed of a single land mass that was uplifted by tectonic forces, the mountain range includes several spurs and ridges such as Parrett Mountain, Ribbon Ridge, and Bald Peak.

The highest peak in the Chehalem Mountain Range is Bald Peak, rising to 1,629 feet (497 m), which is also the highest peak point within the Willamette Valley.

== Chehalem Mountains AVA ==
The Chehalem Mountains AVA has been a designated American Viticultural Area since 2006.

== See also ==
- Picture of southern flank of the range
- Bald Peak State Scenic Viewpoint
- Chehalem Mountains AVA
- Chehalem Ridge Nature Park
- Ribbon Ridge AVA
