= Guantanamo Bay detainee documents =

Initially the Bush Presidency asserted that they did not have to release any of the Guantanamo captive's documents. They asserted that no captive apprehended in Afghanistan was entitled to the protections of the Geneva Convention, and that those held in the Guantanamo Bay Naval Base were not protected by US law either, because it was not on US territory.

This position was widely criticized, and was challenged in the United States's Judicial System, with several cases eventually being heard before the Supreme Court of the United States. In Rasul v. Bush the Supreme Court overruled the Executive Branch, and clarified that the United States District Courts had jurisdiction to hear detainees' suits for writs of habeas corpus.

By September 2007 Eleven official lists have been released. Many captives names were spelled inconsistently on these lists.

== Document preparation ==
One of the results of the Rasul v. Bush ruling was the creation of the Office for the Administrative Review of Detained Enemy Combatants (OARDEC). OARDEC was responsible for the implementation of a one time Combatant Status Review Tribunal (CSRT) and annual Administrative Review Board (ARB) hearings.

The CSR Tribunals and ARB hearings structure was modeled after the Tribunals described in Army Regulation 190-8 (AR 190-9), but with different mandates.

The mandate of the AR 190-8 Tribunals is to fulfill the USA's Geneva Convention obligation to give captives a "competent tribunal"—authorized to make a determination as to whether the captive is a "privileged belligerent" entitled to the Conventions protections, an innocent civilian, who should be immediately released, or a combatant who has violated the laws of war. According to the Geneva Conventions only combatants who a competent tribunal, like the AR 190-8 Tribunals, has determined are combatants who have violated the laws of war can be tried for hostile acts.

The CSR Tribunals mandate is to make a determination as to whether the Guantanamo captives had been correctly determined to have been "enemy combatants".

The ARBs mandate is to annually review each captive's case and make a recommendation as to whether the USA has a continuing reason to hold the captive.

Eventually close to ten thousand pages of documents prepared for captives CSR Tribunals and ARB hearings.

== CSRT unclassified dossiers ==
179 Guantanamo captives had the unclassified documents prepared for their Combatant Status Review Tribunals (CSRT) released to their lawyers. In 2005 the Associated Press hosted 58 of these unclassified CSRT dossier.

== Documents released in 2005 ==
In response to a Freedom of Information Act (FOIA) request from the Associated Press the United States Department of Defense released 507 or the 558 Summary of Evidence memos prepared for the captives' CSR Tribunals.

== List of captives ==
The DoD challenged another FOIA request from AP, for a list of the captive's names, and the transcripts from their Tribunals. The DoD did not challenge this request on national security grounds. The DoD declined to release these documents, and based their refusal by arguing that they were concerned for protecting the captives' privacy.

In January 2006 US District Court Justice Jed Rakoff, the judge who was considering the Department of Defense's arguments dismissed the DoD's arguments, and gave the DoD a deadline of 6pm Friday, March 3, 2006. The DoD did deliver a CD, with approximately 5,000 pages of documents, in 60 large portable document format files on March 3, but they didn't make the 6pm deadline. Even so, they sent a military courier to retrieve the disk they had delivered late, and replace it with a more limited one.

The documents the DoD released were incomplete. While several dozen transcripts contained the captives names, because they had spelled them out, because they said their documents bore the wrong name, all the other documents were identified only by their Internee Security Number.

The DoD released updated versions of some of the original 60 pdf files, released another 16 files containing transcripts from the first annual Administrative Review Board hearings. On April 20, 2006 released a list of the names, nationalities and ISNs of the 558 captives whose cases were considered by CSR Tribunals.

This made it possible to tie the 300+ transcripts identified solely by an ISN with individual captives.

On May 15, 2006 the DoD released a list of the names, nationalities, ISN, date of birth, and place of birth, of all the 759 captives who had been held in Guantanamo.

== Habeas Corpus documents ==
Thousands of pages from captives habeas corpus requests have been made public.

== Military Commission charge sheets ==
In 2004 four captives faced charges before the first version of the Guantanamo military commissions. The charge sheets against these men were made public.

In 2005 a further five captives faced charges, before the second version of the military commissions. Their charge sheets were also made public.

In 2006 one more captive faced charges before the second version of the military commissions.

In July 2006 the Supreme Court ruled, in Hamdan v. Rumsfeld, that the Bush Presidency lacked the constitutional authority to establish military commissions. It ruled that only the United States Congress had the authority to establish the commissions.

In the fall of 2006 Congress passed the Military Commissions Act of 2006. This act established a third version of the military commissions. Three of the original ten captives who had faced charges under the earlier versions of the commissions had new charges filed under the new version. These charges were also made public.

== 14 "high value detainees" ==
On September 6, 2006 President Bush transferred 14 "high value detainees" who had been held in secret CIA black sites. They were the first transfers since Rasul v. Bush.

Another five new captives were transferred in the year that followed.

== September 10th, 2007 releases ==
The DoD quietly released nine new lists and 112 pdf files containing new documents, or new versions of previously released documents.

Index for Combatant Status Review Board unclassified summaries of evidence	This file, dated July 17, 2007, indexes into nine pdf files that contain the Summary of Evidence memos prepared for the initial 558 CSR Tribunals held from August 2004 to January 2005, and the 14 CSR Tribunals held in the winter of 2007.; The nine files differ markedly from the first time these documents were released.; The memos in the original release had both the captives' names and their ISNs redacted.; The memos in the original release were not in alphabetic order, or in order by the ISNs.; Some of the memos were heavily notated. 169 of them had handwritten notes with the ISN number in the upper right hand corner.; The new version do not have either the names or ISNs redacted, and they are in order by ISN.
Index for Testimony	This file, dated September 4, 2007, indexes into the 53 pdf files containing CSR Tribunal and related documents for 360 of the 558 captives.
Index for CSRT Records Publicly Files in Guantanamo Detainee Cases	This file, dated August 8, 2007, indexes into 52 pdf files that contain the records from 179 captive documents—mainly writs of habeas corpus.
Index of Transcripts and Certain Documents from ARB Round One	This file, dated August 9, 2007, indexes into 19 pdf files that contain the transcripts from 279 captives' transcripts from their first annual ARB hearings.
Index to Summaries of Detention-Release Factors for ARB Round One	This file, dated July 17, 2007, indexes into 14 pdf files, that contain all 464 Summary of Evidence memos prepared for the first annual ARB hearings.; On March 3, 2006 the DoD released three pdf files that contained 121 ARB Summary of Evidence memos. Those three files unlike the other 70 files released in 2006 had the captives' ISNs redacted, and their names in the clear.
Index to Transfer and Release Decision for Guantanamo Detainees	This file, dated July 17, 2007, provides an index to eleven pdf files that contain 133 Administrative Review Board Decision memos from the first annual set of ARB hearings.
Index to Transcripts and Certain Documents from Administrative Review Boards Round Two	This file, dated September 4, 2007, provides an index to ten files that contain 66 transcripts or other documents from the second annual ARB documents.
Index of Summaries of Detention-Release Factors for ARB Round Two	This file, dated July 17, 2007, indexes into ten pdf files that contain 330 Summary of Evidence memos prepared for the second annual ARB hearings.
Index of Transfer and Release Decision for Guantanamo Detainees from ARB Round Two	This file, dated August 10, 2007, provides an index to six pdf files that contain 55 Administrative Review Board Decision memos from the second annual set of ARB hearings.

== Non-combatant release ==
In late 2004 and early 2005 OARDEC's recommendations that thirty-eight captives had not been enemy combatants in the first place was confirmed by the Designated Civilian Official.

In 2006 the Washington Post could only confirm the names of 30 of the 38 men.

On November 19, 2007 the Department of Defense published an official list of the 38 men's names.
