= Sandra Hodgkinson =

American lawyer

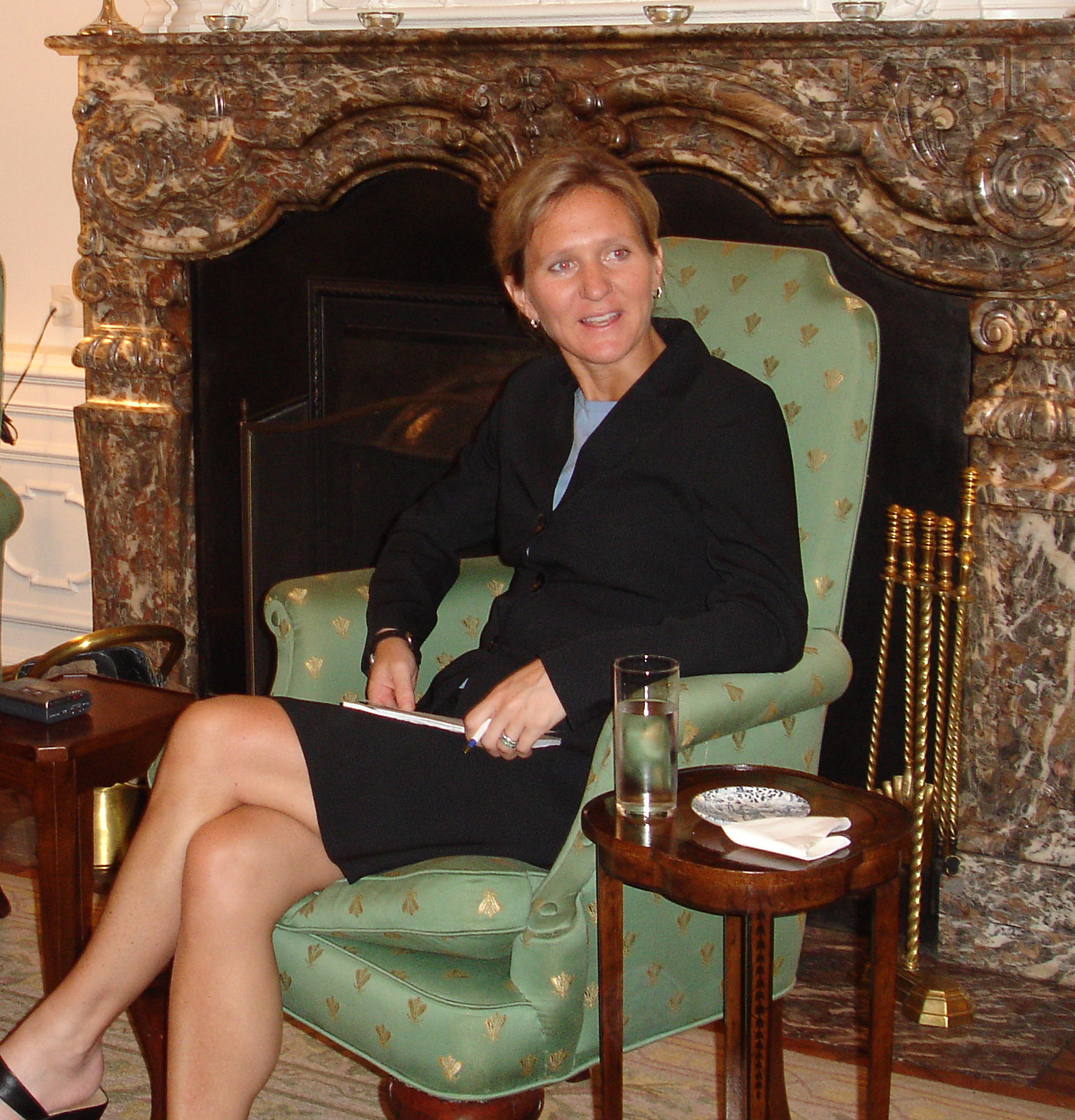
- Sandra Hodgkinson at the US Embassy in the Hague

Deputy Assistant Secretary of Defense for Detainee Policy
- In office July 2007 – May 2009
- President: George W. Bush; Barack Obama
- Secretary: Robert Gates
- Succeeded by: Phil Carter

Personal details
- Education: Tulane University (BA); University of Denver (MA), (JD)

Military service
- Branch/service: United States Navy
- Years of service: 1996-2017
- Rank: Captain

Sandra Hodgkinson is an American lawyer and officer in the United States Navy Reserve. She currently serves as senior vice president for strategic planning and chief of staff at DRS Technologies and Leonardo North America, headquartered in Arlington, Virginia.

== Career ==
Prior to joining DRS in 2012, Hodgkinson served as a career civil servant up through the rank of senior executive service (SES) at the United States Department of Defense, United States Department of State, and the White House during both the George W. Bush and Barack Obama administrations. Her assignments included special assistant (chief of staff) to Deputy Secretary of Defense William J. Lynn III, deputy assistant secretary of defense (DASD), distinguished visiting research fellow at National Defense University (NDU), deputy to the ambassador-at-large for war crimes issues, director for international justice at the National Security Council (NSC), and senior advisor at the Coalition Provisional Authority (CPA) in Baghdad, Iraq. Prior to civil service, Hodgkinson spent six years as a U.S. Navy Judge Advocate General's (JAG) Corps officer serving as an appellate clerk, prosecutor/international criminal jurisdiction officer (Naples, Italy), and as a country program director, training foreign military and civilians in over 30 countries. She is a captain in the Navy JAG Corps reserves.
