= Laurelwood, Oregon =

Unincorporated community in the state of Oregon, United States

- Unincorporated community
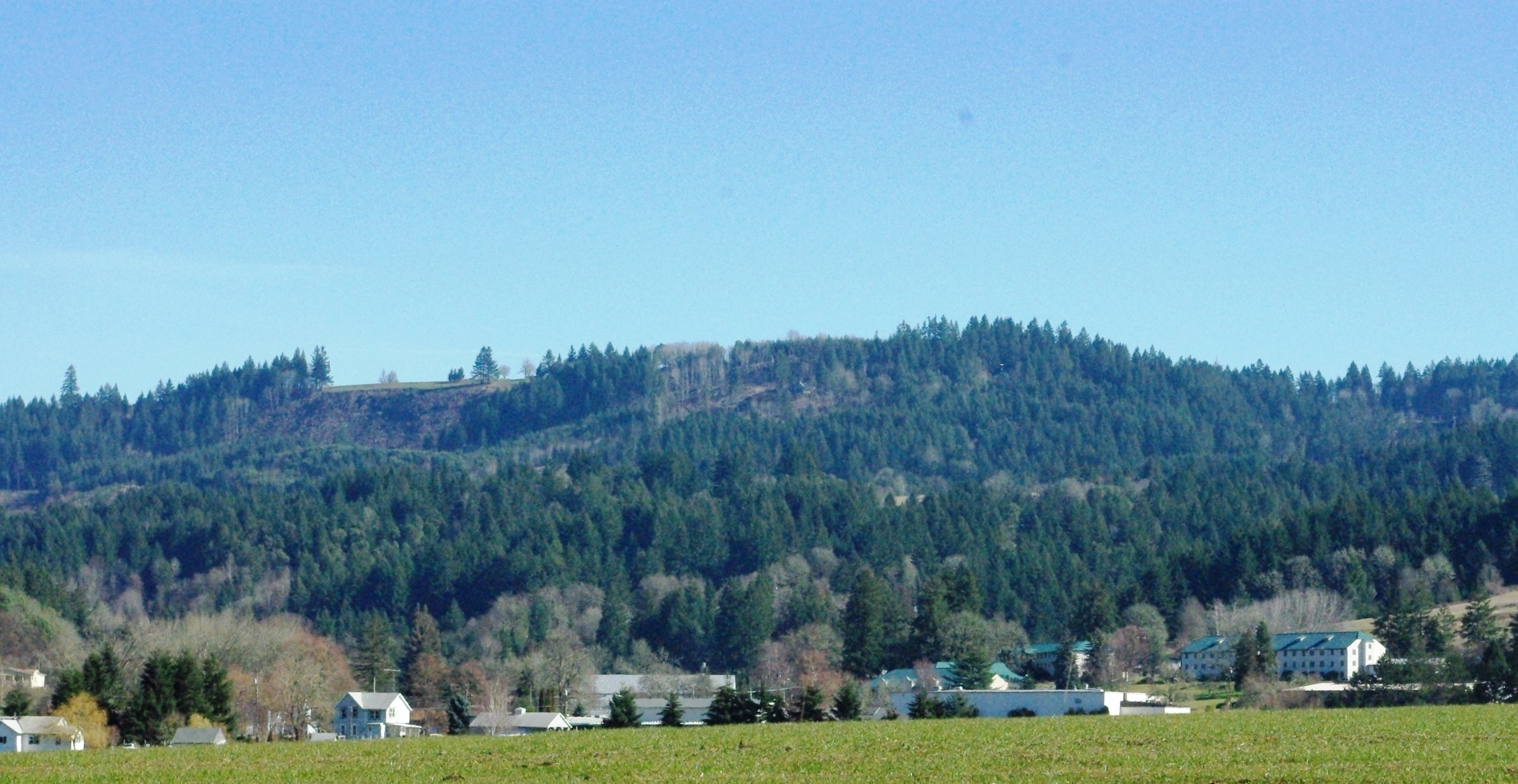
- View from the west with Chehalem Mountain in the background

- Location within the state of Oregon Laurelwood, Oregon (the United States)
- Coordinates: 45°25′22″N 123°04′51″W
- Country: United States
- State: Oregon
- County: Washington
- Elevation: 243 ft (74 m)

Population (2000)
  - Total: 503
- Time zone: UTC-8 (Pacific (PST))
  - Summer (DST): UTC-7 (PDT)
- ZIP code: 97119
- Area codes: 503 and 971
- GNIS feature ID: 1163093

Laurelwood is an unincorporated community in Washington County, Oregon, United States. The community is located southwest of the Portland metropolitan area near Oregon Route 47 along Laurelwood Road, to the east of the city of Gaston and Wapato Lake. Laurelwood, a farming community, has a population of approximately 500 people. Settled in the 1860s, the community was home to Laurelwood Academy from 1904 until 2007. A large portion of the community is of the Seventh-day Adventist faith.

== History ==
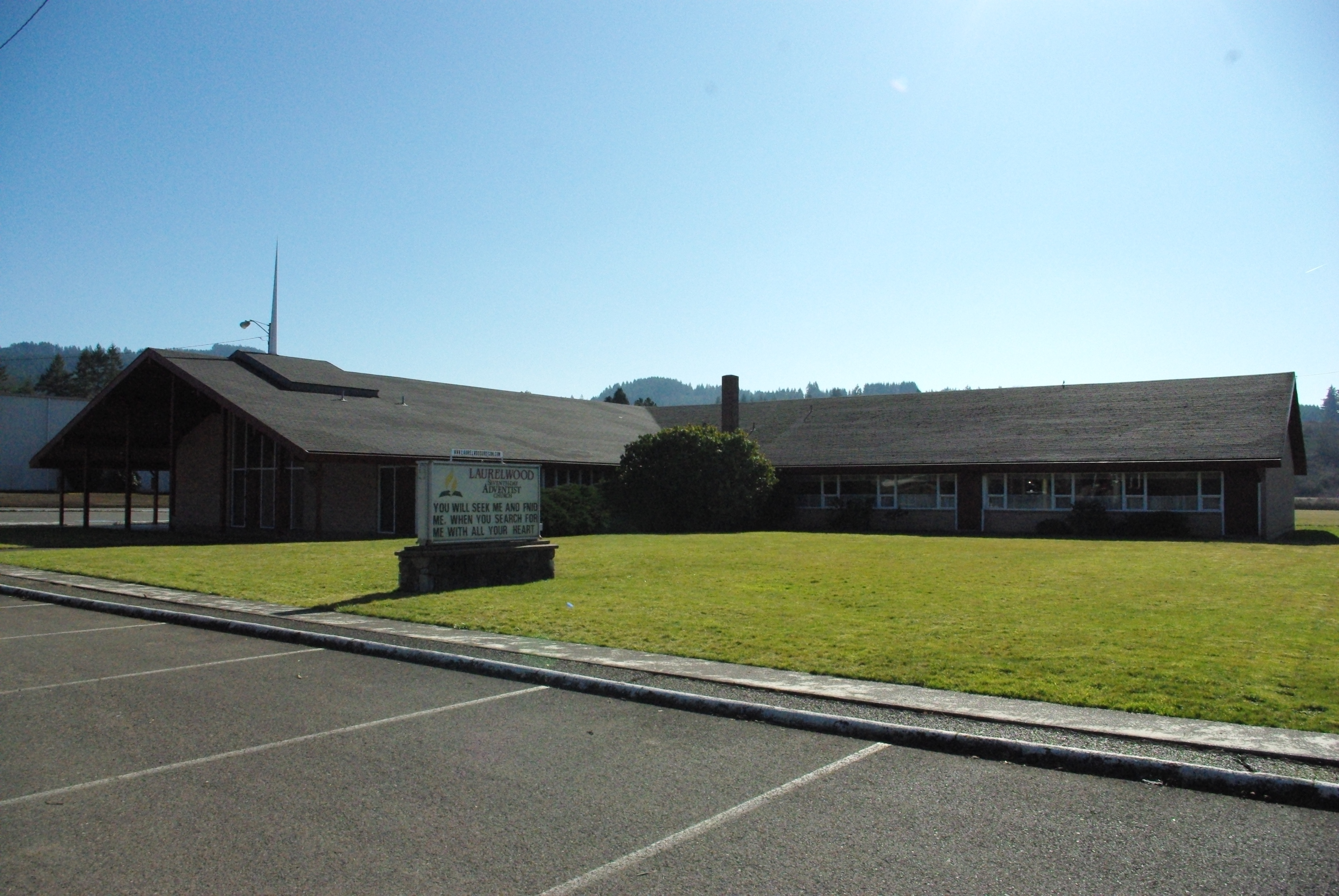
Church in the community

Laurelwood was settled circa 1860 in a small valley to the east of what is now Gaston. Most of the community is on the former Donation Land Claim of R. D. Walker. In 1904, the Laurelwood Academy was founded in the community as a Seventh-day Adventist school. Adventist-owned Harris Pine Mills opened a furniture plant and milling plant in the village in 1965, growing to a 60-employee operation. At one time, residents called each other villagers as opposed to the students of the academy.

In August 1977, four people were murdered in the community, shot execution-style. The victims—two seven-year-old girls, their 24-year-old mother, and the 19-year-old son of her boyfriend—were killed after the mother had testified against a leader of the Hells Angels. Robert G. McClure was convicted of the killings and Hells Angels leader Odis Garrett was convicted of ordering the murders, in 1994 and 1995 respectively.

Laurelwood Academy closed in 1985 and was sold to an alumni group, who re-opened the school in 1988.

In March 1986, the milling operations of the Harris Pine Mills was closed, followed by the furniture manufacturing facility in 1988. Laurelwood was one of sixteen places studied for a possible minimum security prison in 1988. The prison would have been at the former Laurelwood Academy after it shutdown in 1985, but there was local opposition and the prison was never built. Later that year the Adventist school re-opened.

In 1992, Marvin McDougal, a Laurelwood Academy alumnus, proposed developing 165 acres (0.67 km^{2}) in the area into 54 homes to support the academy. Local residents formed an opposition group and fought the development. The county initially approved the development, but residents appealed the decision. Washington County eventually denied approval for the development. In 2007, Laurelwood Academy moved to a new campus near Eugene, Oregon.

== Details ==
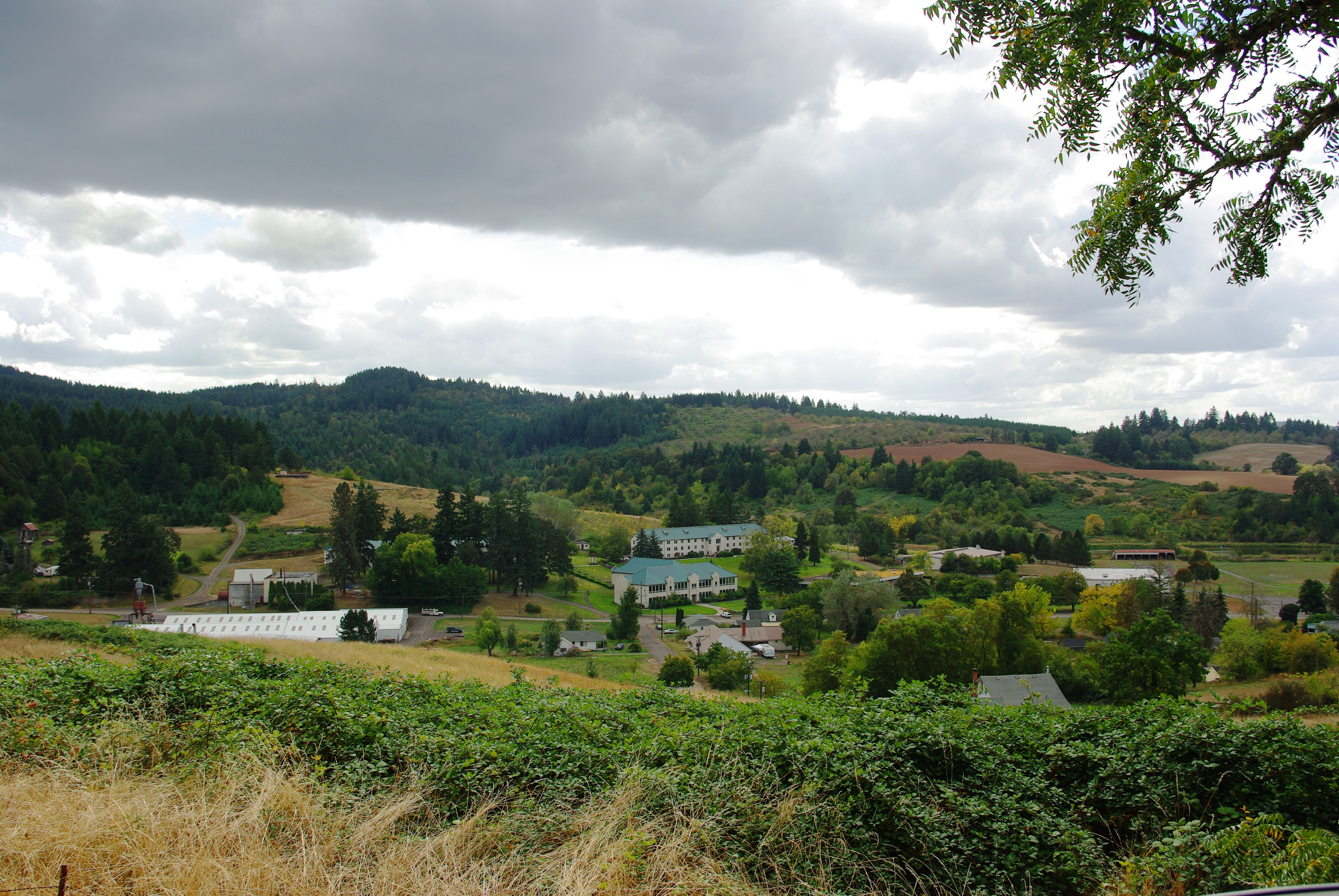
Laurelwood from Hartley Road

The population is composed partially of retirees and former students and teachers of Laurelwood Academy. Much of the community is of the Adventist faith. Laurelwood is still mostly made up of homes situated on one to 10 acres (40,000 m^{2}). At the 2000 census, the area had 503 people. The community has the Gaston ZIP Code of 97119. Gaston Rural Fire District covers the community, drinking water is supplied by the Laurelwood Water Co-op, and public education is provided by the Gaston School District. Oregon House of Representatives District 31 (Darcey Edwards) and Oregon Senate District 16 (Suzanne Weber) cover Laurelwood. Laurelwood is within Oregon's 1st congressional district, represented by Congresswoman Suzanne Bonamici.

The main road through the community is Laurelwood Road, which windingly descends through dense tree cover from the top of the Chehalem Mountains and past the academy on its way towards Gaston. The name comes from the abundance of laurel trees above the valley that stretch to the top of Bald Peak atop the mountain to the east. By 1981, one of the trees was still standing, but the compiler of Oregon Geographic Names was informed that the trees were in fact Pacific Madrones. The Washington County Scenic Loop passes through the hamlet. The area also lends its name to a type of soil composed of silt loam.

== Laurelwood Academy ==
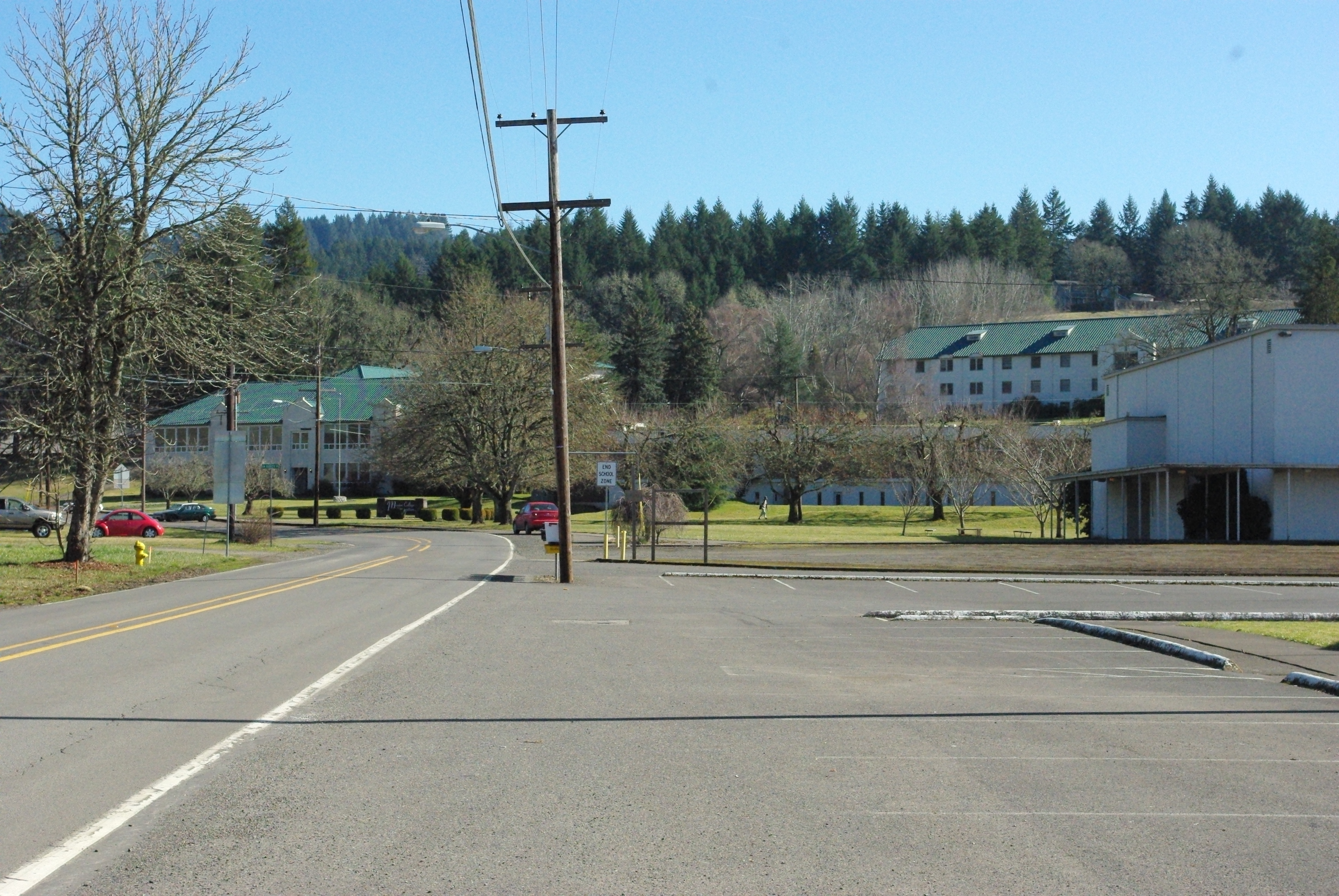
Former Seventh-day Adventist academy

Laurelwood Academy was established in 1904 on the Walker land claim, with a chapel added in 1908. Initially 5 acres (20,000 m^{2}), Walker sold more land to the school in subsequent years. When it opened it taught grades one through ten under the direction of principal Robert Arye. The first graduate of the academy was Henry Dirkson. In 1907, J. L. Kay became the principal and expanded the school to twelve grades. A Seventh-day Adventist school, the four-year academy grew to as large as 350 students by 1976. The unaffiliated, but adjacent, Laurelwood Adventist Elementary School opened in 1950.

The academy added a manual labor building in 1925 followed by an administration structure in 1943 and a new church in 1957. Laurelwood Academy was closed in 1985 after enrollment had declined at the schools of the Oregon Conference of Seventh-day Adventists. After re-opening in the late 1980s, the school relocated in 2007 when enrollment was at 90 students. Laurelwood Seventh-Day Adventist Elementary School still exists, and now has enrollment of about 20, in grades 1–8. Recently, the former academy buildings housed the Mission College of Evangelism run by Carol and Louis Torres. Even more recently, prior to the COVID-19 pandemic, half of the academy buildings housed Ananda Laurelwood, a spiritual retreat.
