= Joseph Gaston =

Joseph Gaston may refer to:

- Joseph P. Gaston, American railroad executive, journalist, and historian
- Joseph Alfred Gaston, United States Army officer
- Joe Gaston (politician), Northern Irish unionist politician
- Joe Gaston (rugby union), Irish international rugby union player

== See also ==
- Joseph Gaston House, Portland, Oregon
