= Laurelwood =

Laurelwood may refer to:

- the wood of Lauraceae
- Laurelwood Academy, a school near Eugene, Oregon, United States
- Laurelwood, Oregon, a community in Washington County, Oregon, United States
- Laurelwood Historic District, a historic district in Roseburg, Oregon, United States
- Laurelwood Pub and Brewery, a brewpub in Oregon, United States
- Laurelwood Elementary School, a school in the Evergreen Elementary School District in California, United States
- Laurelwood, a ship renamed the RFA Cherryleaf
- Laurelwood (Columbia, South Carolina), listed on the NRHP in South Carolina
- Laurelwood, a mental healthcare facility in Gainesville, Georgia under the Northeast Georgia Hospital system
- Laurelwood, the original name of Studio City, California area.
