= Tualatin River National Wildlife Refuge =

Wetlands and lowlands sanctuary in the U.S. state of Oregon

- IUCN category IV (habitat/species management area)
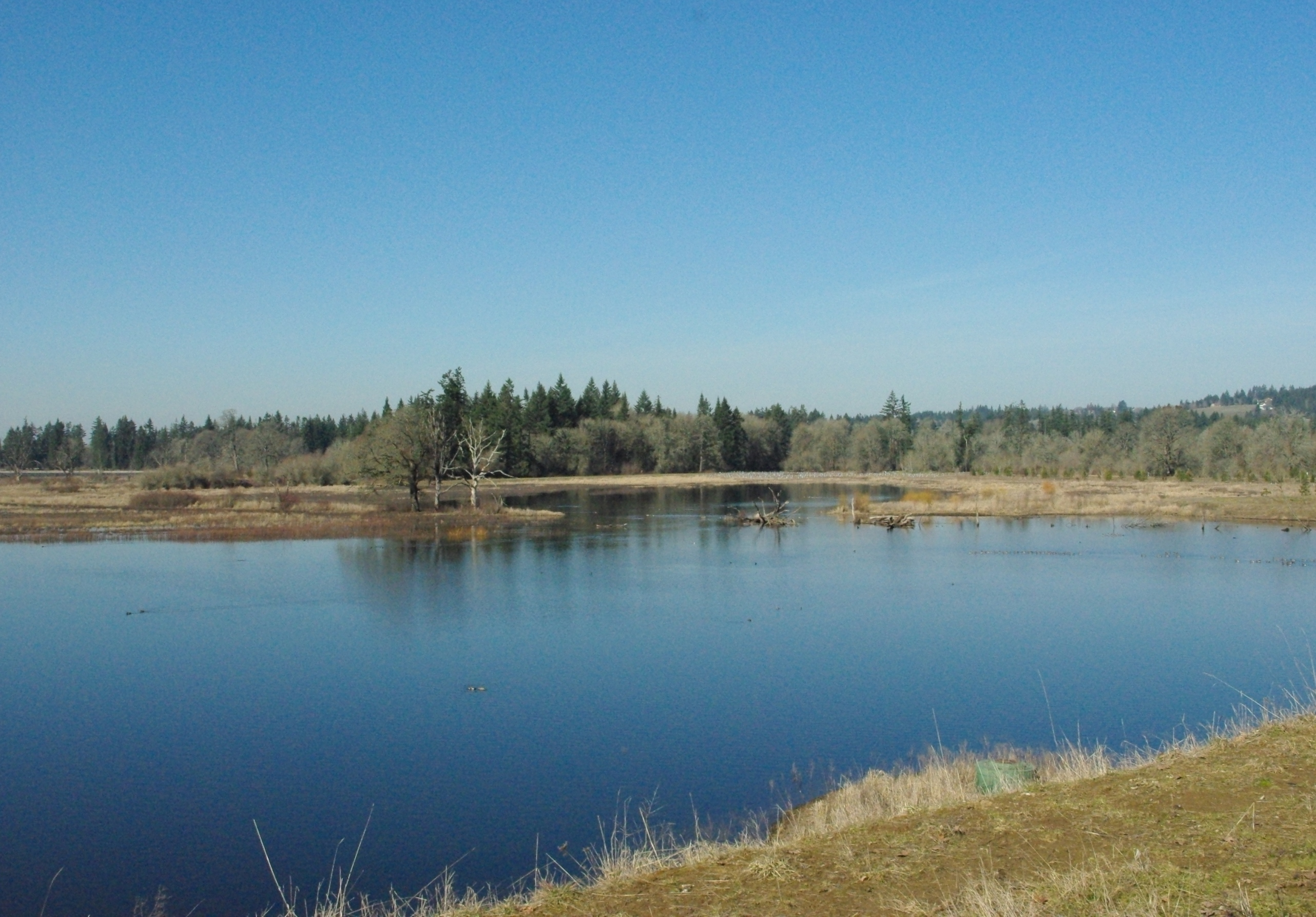
- Pond at the park with woodlands in background
- Interactive map of Tualatin River National Wildlife Refuge
- Location: Washington and Yamhill counties Oregon, United States
- Nearest city: Sherwood, Oregon
- Coordinates: 45°23′20″N 122°51′30″W
- Area: 1,856 acres (751 ha)
- Established: 1992; Opened in 2006
- Visitors: 150,000+ (in 2020)
- Governing body: U.S. Fish and Wildlife Service
- Website: www.fws.gov/refuge/tualatin-river

The Tualatin River National Wildlife Refuge is a 1,856 acres (751 ha) wetlands and lowlands sanctuary in the northwestern part of the U.S. state of Oregon. Established in 1992 and opened to the public in 2006, it is managed by the United States Fish and Wildlife Service. Located in southeastern Washington County, 15 miles (24 km) southwest of Portland, the refuge is bordered by Sherwood, Tualatin and Tigard. A newer area, extending into northern Yamhill County, is located further west near the city of Gaston surrounding the former Wapato Lake.

Part of the network of National Wildlife Refuges (NWR), the Tualatin River refuge is one of only ten urban refuges in the United States. Habitats in the refuge include forested areas, wetlands, oak and pine grassland, and meadows, with mixed deciduous and coniferous forests common to Western Oregon. The refuge was established as an urban refuge to provide wetland, riparian, and upland habitats for a variety of migratory birds, threatened and endangered species, fish and other resident wildlife. The refuge is home to nearly 200 bird species and more than 70 other animal species.

A visitor center with exhibits and information about the refuge was opened in 2008 off of Oregon Route 99W near Sherwood in the Portland metropolitan area. Next to the center is the refuge's headquarters and an observation deck overlooking seasonal ponds. The refuge has nearly five miles of wildlife interpretive trails open to the public. Up to 50,000 waterfowl can be seen at the refuge during the winter months when officials flood portions of the refuge.

== History ==
Map of the refuge

The creation of a national wildlife refuge in the Sherwood area was conceptualized and proposed by Sherwood resident Jim Claus to the Sherwood City Council in 1989 under the working concept "The Rock Creek National Wildlife Refuge". Claus, who had a long history of working with government agencies such as the U.S. Fish and Wildlife Service on wildlife conservation initiatives and projects, began building agency and citizen coalitions at the local, state, and national levels to initiate the Rock Creek refuge. In 1991, the United States Fish and Wildlife Service began looking at creating a national wildlife refuge along the Tualatin River near Sherwood at Rock Creek. The original plans called for a 2,500-acre (1,000 ha) refuge near Sherwood and Oregon Route 99W and then grew to a 3,000-acre (1,200 ha) proposal that would have unconnected parts, with the additional wetlands near Scholls to the west. To press for the creation of the proposed Tualatin River National Wildlife Refuge, Claus, along with local officials and citizens groups, lobbied Congress for funding, which included a video narrated by actor Robert Wagner done at the request of his friend Jim Claus. Initial estimates for the completion of the project were up to 30 years at a cost of $10 million for land acquisitions.

In late 1992, area residents Tom Stibolt and Lisa Brenner donated the first 12 acres (4.9 ha) to the project, with the Fish and Wildlife Service then accepting the donation to officially create the refuge. They had purchased the 12 acres (49,000 m^{2}) of woodland which adjoined their own property and donated it to the refuge. Sherwood donated the second parcel to the refuge, 1-acre (0.40 ha) in 1993. Congress approved $2 million for the project to purchase more land in November 1993. In January 1994, the Department of the Interior granted the Fish and Wildlife Service the authority to spend the money in order to begin buying land for the refuge. Congress gave the project an additional $2.5 million in 1995.

In the early years, the facility was only open to the public for a songbird festival in May and National Wildlife Refuge Week in October. A program to restore the habitat to its original state began in 1997. During that year, twenty water flow systems and dikes were added at the refuge to allow managers to flood parts of the land. The refuge grew from what was once a former dairy farm that spanned 400 acres (160 ha) to more than 800 acres (320 ha) by September 1998. In the spring of 1999, the $1.1 million system for flooding parts of the refuge was completed. In total, the refuge grew to 1,066 acres (431 ha) in 1999, and increased the number of bird species from 18 to 146. The facility was further enlarged to 1,268 acres (513 ha) in 2003, and received nearly $750,000 to build a new safe entrance to the planned visitor's area.

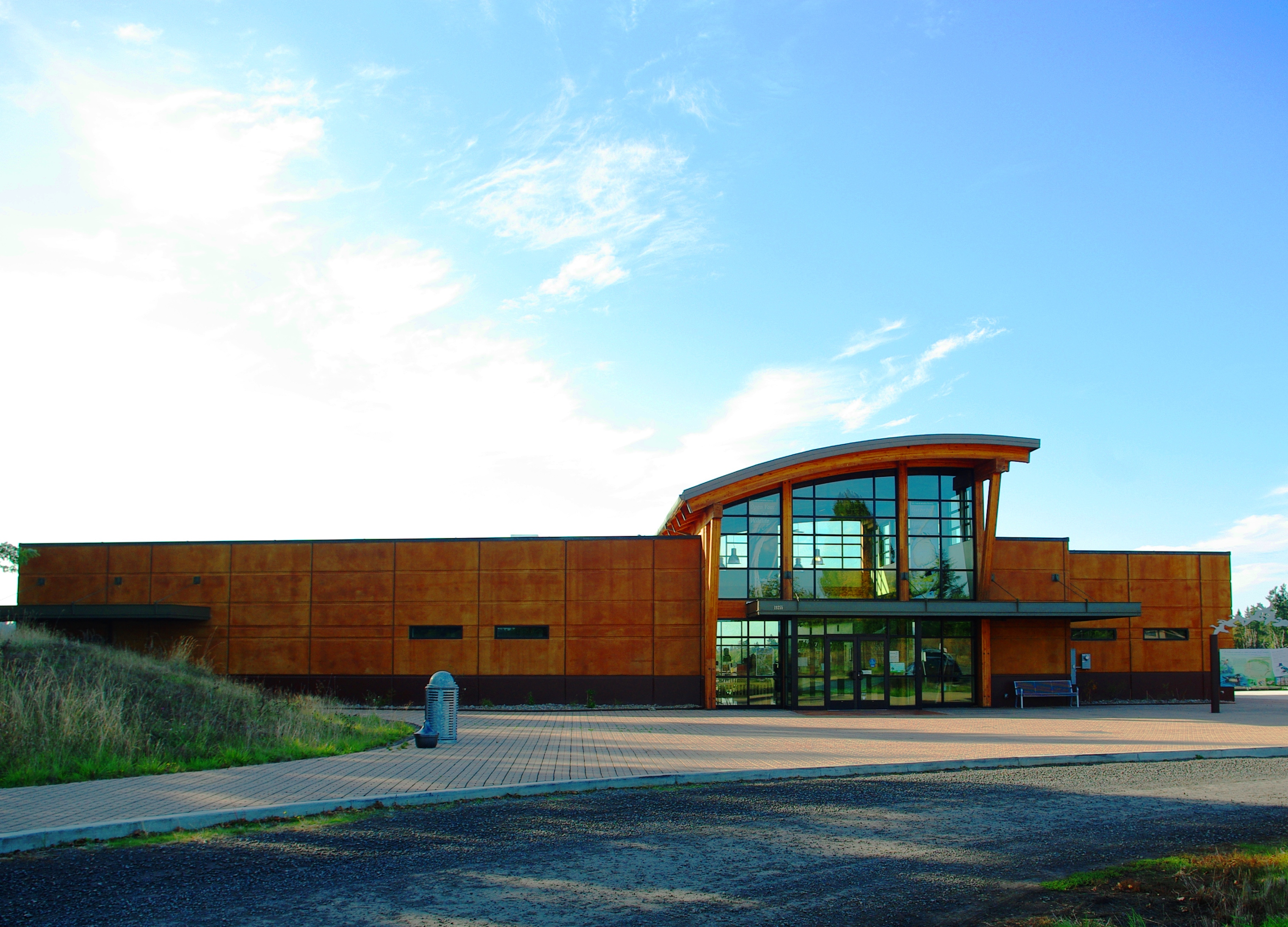
The Wildlife Center opened in 2008

In November 2004, Congress appropriated $700,000 for the NWR to cover the costs of designing a public visitor center. By 2005 construction had progressed on public facilities at the site that included trails, observations decks, parking, and an entrance from Oregon Route 99W with plans for permanently opening to the public in 2006. In July 2005, the refuge received $3.9 million from the federal government to complete a visitor center and new headquarters for the facility. In February 2006, construction began on the main observation deck at the visitor's plaza, with plans to open the refuge to the public in June.

Regular public access began on June 3, 2006, when roughly 450 acres (180 ha) of more than 1,300 acres (530 ha) of the refuge was opened on a permanent basis; Construction on the visitor center began later that month. In March 2007, the Wapato Lake Unit was created to the west near Gaston. In the same month, the refuge received the 2007 Sunset Magazine Environmental Award, with the magazine honoring the refuge as a "preserved paradise". The number of annual visitors to the refuge totaled 40,000 in 2007.

The Wildlife Center at the refuge was finally completed and opened in January 2008. A dedication ceremony was held at the Wildlife Center on March 29, 2008; 500 people attended the event including Congressman David Wu and author Richard Louv. In 2008, the refuge had attracted 50,000 birds in a single day, with 20,000 birds wintering in the refuge. As of December 2008, the federal government had spent $10.4 million on the refuge and it had grown to 1,358 acres (550 ha). The refuge submitted a proposal to start collecting user fees in February 2009, with a planned start date of August 2009. In December 2013, the Wapato Lake National Wildlife Refuge was split out from TRNWF.

== Natural environment ==
Seasonal wetlands to the west of the visitor center

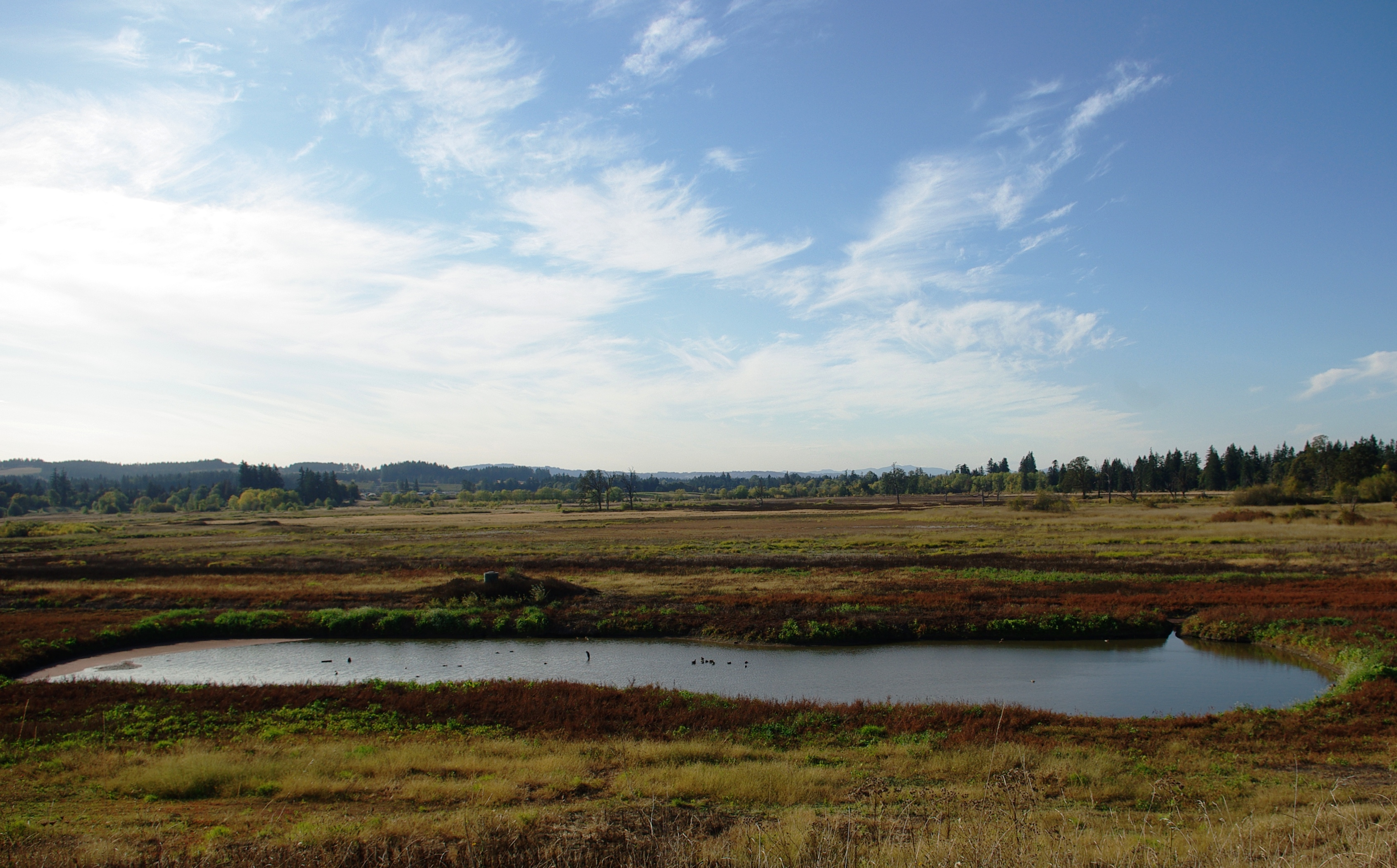
Area in early fall

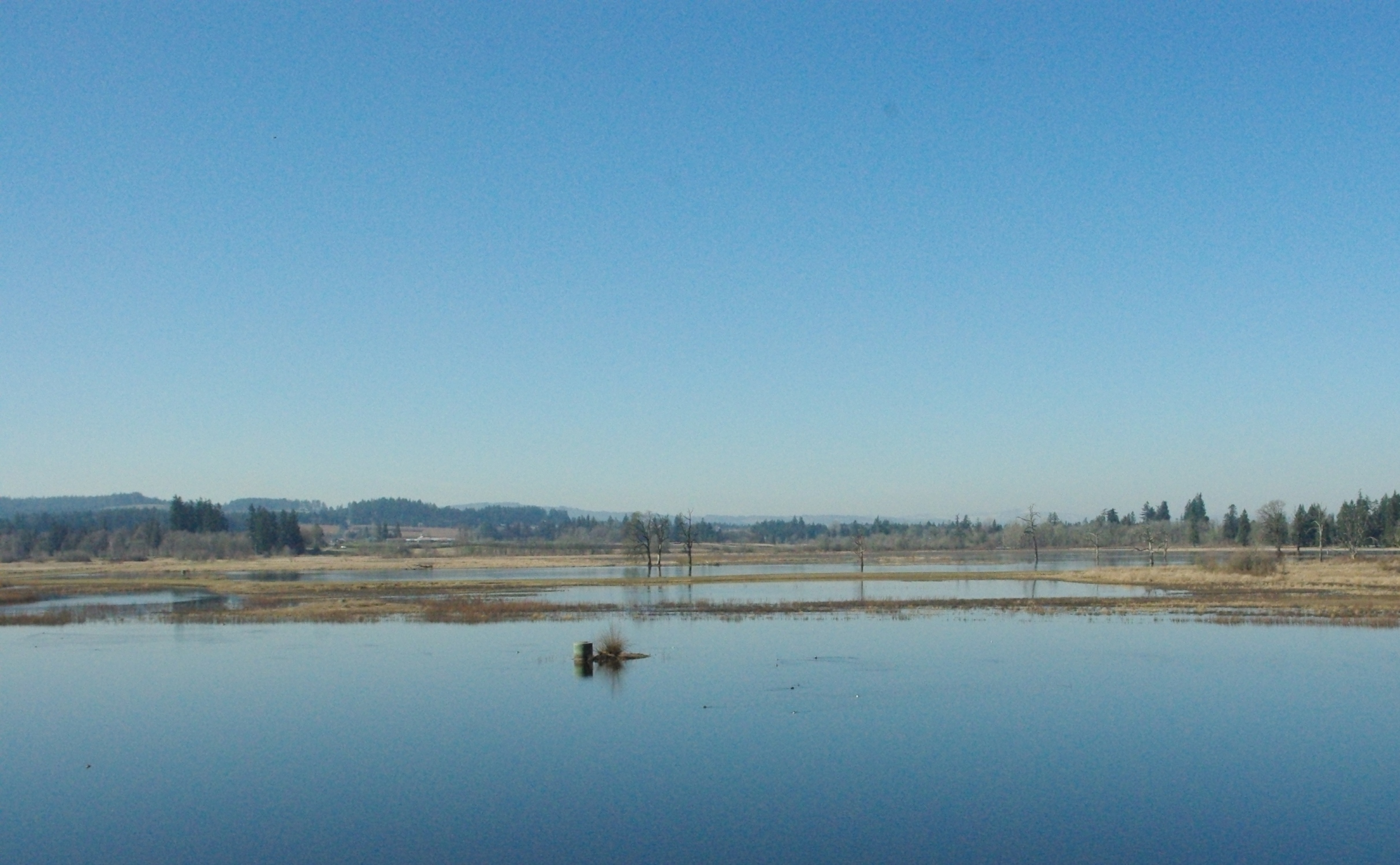
Area in late winter

Before becoming a protected area, much of the land in the Tualatin River National Wildlife Refuge was agricultural, with hog and dairy farms, and crops such as corn and onions. Today, the refuge spreads out over ten miles (16 km) along the Tualatin River, Rock Creek, and Chicken Creek, and is managed in five main sections (units): Rock Creek, Onion Flats, Riverboat, Tualatin River, and Atfálat´i.

The refuge also includes the Tonquin scablands created by the Missoula Floods to the southeast of the river. These scablands were scoured of the top layers of soil, leaving a marsh-filled valley. There is also the Wapato Lake Unit approximately 15 miles (24 km) to the west. Located along the Pacific Flyway for migratory birds, this habitat includes seasonal wetlands, streams, forested wetlands, savanna, riparian zones, forested uplands, and the Tualatin River and portions of its floodplain.

The refuge is home to almost 200 species of birds, more than 50 mammal species, and 25 species of reptiles and amphibians. Tree species include red alder, aspen, maple, oak, Oregon white ash, Douglas fir, ponderosa pine, Pacific yew, and cedar. A pair of 350-year-old oak trees can be found at the visitor center. Plant species in the refuge include bulrushes, wapato, water plantain, as Oregon grape, wild trillium, camas, iris, snowberry, cattails, wild millet, wild rose, thimbleberry, and others. Wildflowers include blue chicory, Douglas spirea, and purple crocuses.

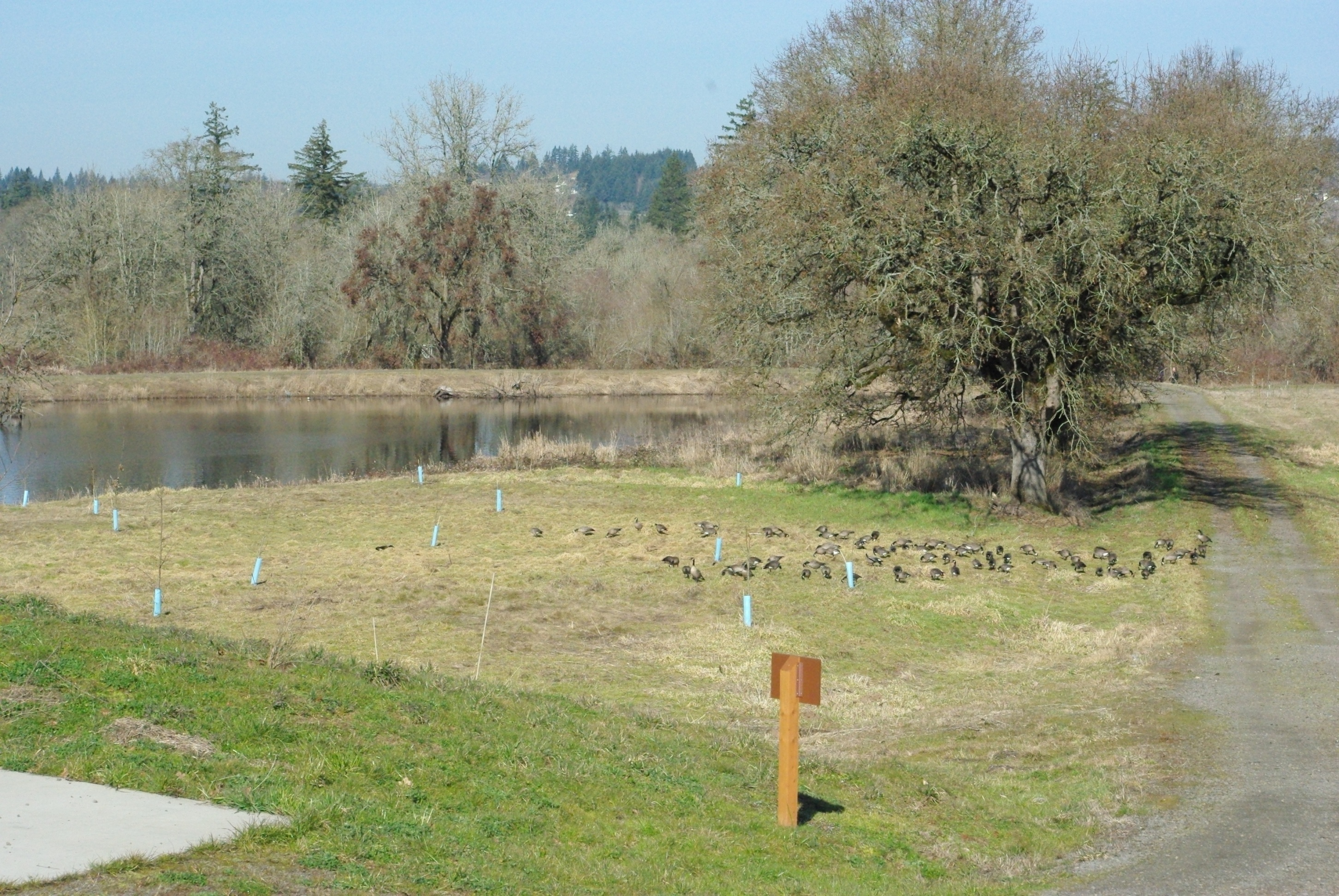
Geese at the refuge in winter

Waterfowl at the refuge include Canada Geese, Wood Ducks, swans, Northern Pintails, Green Herons, teal, mergansers, Belted Kingfishers, and American Wigeon among others. Birds that spend time there include, Great Blue Herons, Sandhill Cranes, Oregon Juncos, wrens, European Starlings, blackbirds, nuthatches, Pacific-slope Flycatchers, Red-tailed Hawks, American Goldfinches, Peregrine Falcons, Yellow Warblers, Western Flycatchers, Killdeer, Northern Harriers, Ospreys, egrets, quail, pheasants, Golden-crowned Kinglets, owls, and Black-headed Grosbeaks to name a few. There is also a pair of Bald Eagles. The year it was created officials counted 24 different bird species. By 2008 there were 185 birds species represented at the refuge.

River otter, beaver, nutria, mink, weasel, red fox, deer, elk, coyotes, raccoons, and rabbits make up a portion of the terrestrial animals. Other wildlife includes painted turtles, frogs, salamanders, crawfish, fish, and alligator lizards. The refuge is one of only ten national wildlife refuges in the United States located in an urban area. Groups have suggested that the refuge be expanded all the way to the Willamette River to provide a greenway through a heavily populated area. The Tualatin's floodplain is the largest of any of the Willamette River's tributaries.

== Amenities ==
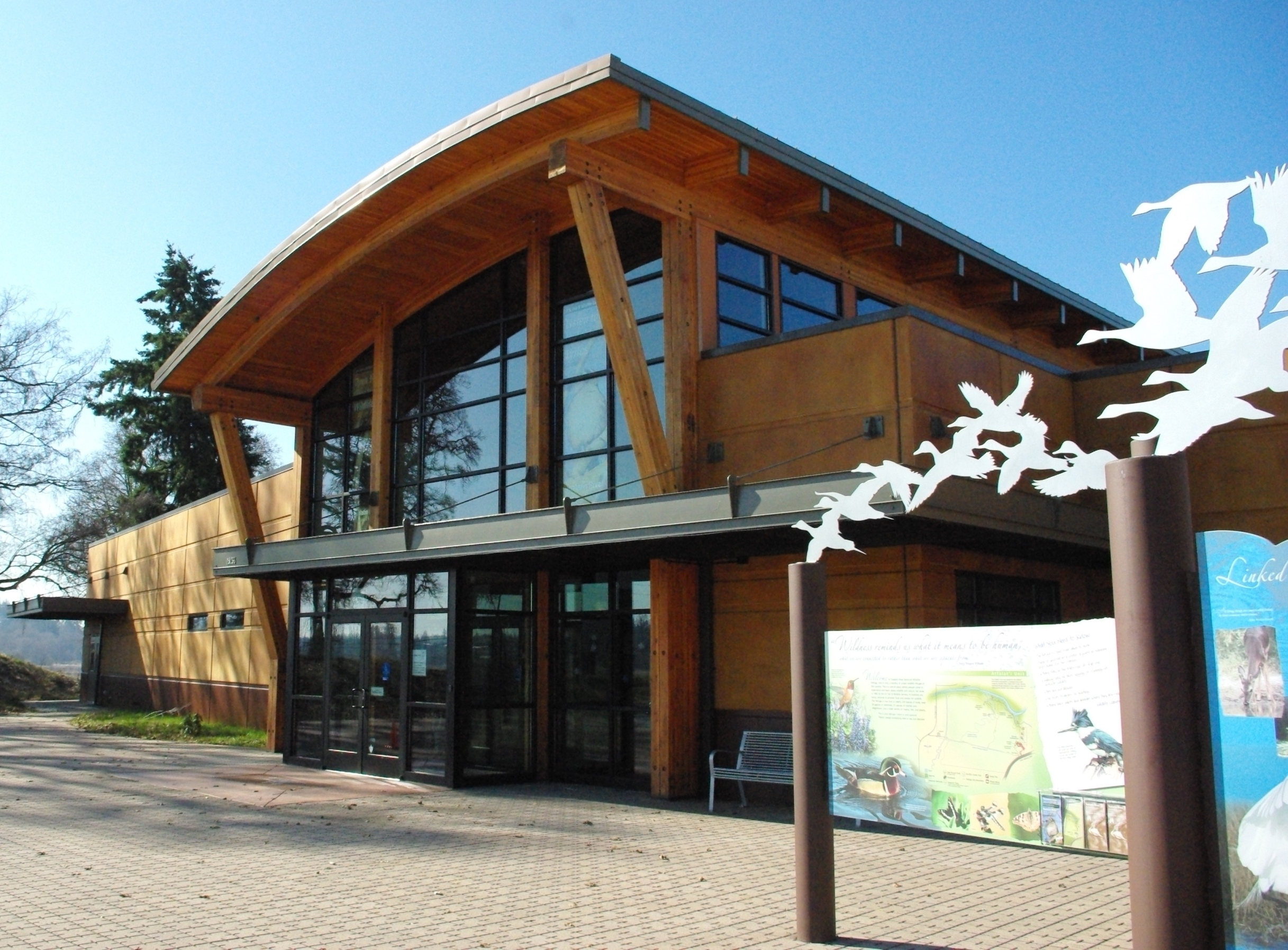
Wildlife Center entrance

Within the refuge only 450 acres (180 ha) of the Atfalat'i Unit is open to the public. This section includes the visitor center with the Wildlife Center and refuge headquarters. The Wildlife Center includes classrooms, a student lab, a gift shop, and informational displays, and is next to a grove of oak trees estimated to be 350 years old. Inside the center are murals, dioramas, and hands-on exhibits, plus the classroom contains skins and skulls of wildlife that live in the refuge. From inside the center, visitors can view the scenery using a viewing scope through a large window overlooking the pond.

The 6,300-square-foot (590 m^{2}) Wildlife Center was designed to give basic information and encourage visitors to then explore the wildlife in their natural habitats. The building is sienna in color and was built with a flat roof that has gravel on top to provide nesting habitat for birds, one of the features designed to be environmentally friendly. Built at a cost of $4.6 million, the Wildlife Center also has a large arced skylight and atrium in the center to provide much natural light. Builders used local wood in the Wildlife Center, which has large, exposed beams. The center and headquarters are adjacent to each other off Oregon Route 99W on a knoll above a seasonal pond.

Original plans called for a $5 million headquarters and wildlife visitor center. Refuge headquarters were previously in old farm buildings to the west on Roy Rogers Road. The new building was awarded honorable mention by the Department of the Interior in its 2008 Environmental Achievement Awards. It was designed to meet Leadership in Energy and Environmental Design standards at the silver level, but did not receive certification from the United States Green Building Council. The administration building and visitor structures were constructed by Wade Perrow Construction.

A variety of people-oriented amenities are spread outdoors across the part of the refuge open to the public. One feature is an outdoor deck overhanging an embank that overlooks ponds at the refuge. This 50-foot (15 m) long concrete deck is of a cantilevered design that extends 30 feet (9.1 m) over the embankment. Other amenities include footbridges, education sites, and walking trails. There are nearly five miles (8.0 km) of trails, but they are closed in the fall and winter. Centennial and River are two of the viewing areas along the trails, each offering a place to view wildlife. Photographers have access to blinds which allow them to take pictures without disturbing the wildlife.

== Wapato Lake Unit ==
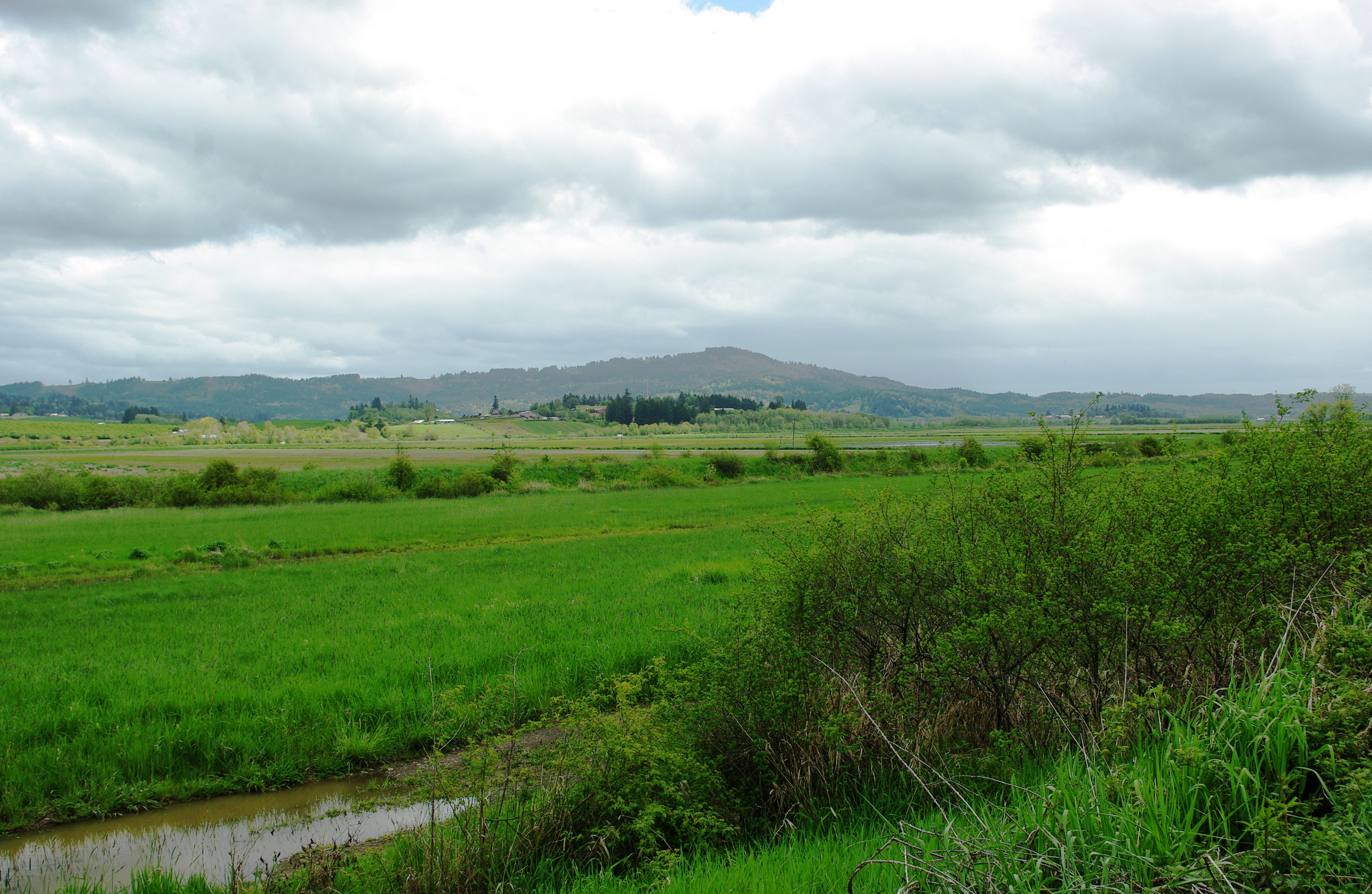
Wapato Lake near Gaston

Wapato Lake Unit is located about 15 miles (24 km) to the west of the main refuge, near the city of Gaston along Oregon Route 47 in Washington and Yamhill counties. The area was once the site of Wapato Lake, whose soil held an organic-rich peat that sustained a shrub swamp ecosystem. The wapato plant (Sagittaria latifolia) grew in the upper marsh of the Wapato Lake Basin and was harvested by Native Americans. In 1892, attempts began to drain the 800 acres (320 ha) lake to increase farmland, with the Wapato Improvement District completing the effort in the 1930s. Valley forests, prairies, and wetlands encompass the region today, including two small streams, Ayers and Wapato creeks.

The government had hoped to add land in the Gaston area to the main refuge, but initially met resistance from local residents. Some residents later asked the government to buy their land for the refuge in 2000. By 2002, up to 6,400 acres (2,600 ha) were being studied in that area for inclusion into the wildlife refuge as part of the then uncreated unit. At that time the Fish and Wildlife Service owned 108 acres (44 ha) in the area, with plans to restore the lake if the unit was established. In March 2007, the Service approved the creation of the Wapato Lake Unit with a boundary encompassing 4,310 possible acres (17.4 km^{2}). In June 2008, the Wapato Lake Unit purchased its first sets of properties. Totaling 180 acres (73 ha) from three properties, the Fish and Wildlife Service paid $631,000 for the land using a grant from the Migratory Bird Conservation Commission. An additional 15 acres (6.1 ha) were added in September. Plans called for restoring the farmland back to its natural state and acquiring all land by 2011.
