= Dundee Lodge =

Historic house in Oregon, United States

- U.S. National Register of Historic Places
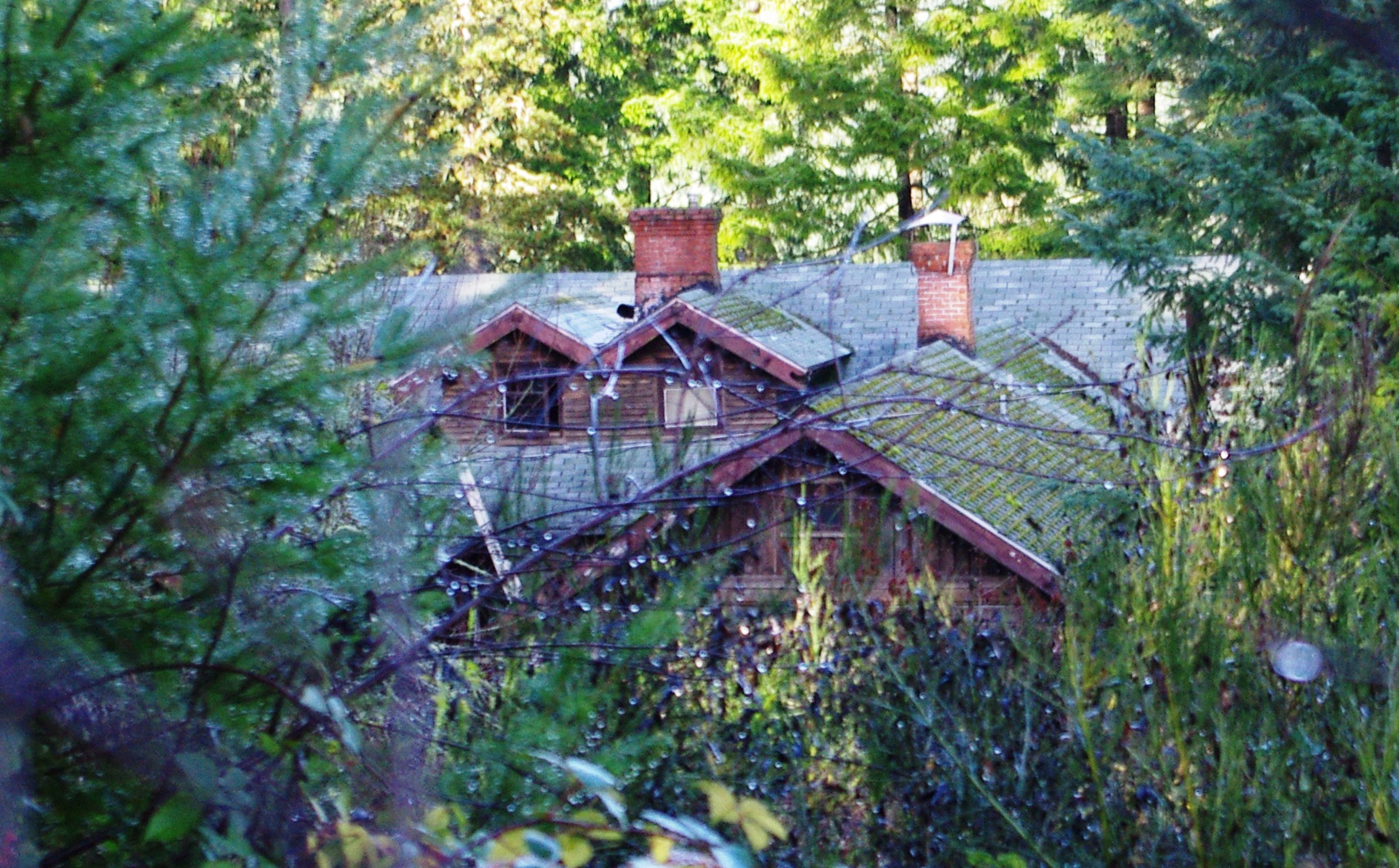
- Dundee Lodge in 2009
- Location: 50845 SW Dundee Road; Gaston, Oregon 97119
- Nearest city: near Cherry Grove, Oregon
- Coordinates: 45°27′33″N 123°11′58″W
- Built: circa 1921
- Architect: E. E. Green
- Architectural style: Rustic
- NRHP reference No.: 85001186
- Added to NRHP: June 6, 1985

Dundee Lodge is a farm with several buildings built in the 1920s located near Gaston in the U.S. state of Oregon. The rustic property in rural Washington County was added to the National Register of Historic Places in 1985. Also known as the Dee Brook Farm (or Deebrook Farm), the property contains three buildings designed by E. E. Green.

== History ==
The Fred and Esther Dundee House was constructed in 1921 by Albert McCloud. Fred A. Dundee owned a machine shop in Portland, Oregon, and had the log cabin built for himself. Known as the Fred Dundee Motor Car Repair and Machine Works, it was located on Broadway at Flanders, and had been on Jefferson Street. Dundee had previously been a race car driver around the turn of the century. He raced cars from the White Motor Company.

The 1 1/2-story home was designed by E. E. Green and was designed for a rustic look. Around the same time the Dundee Lodge was also built at the same location. Also designed by Green, the lodge served as a hotel. On June 6, 1985, the farm was added to the National Register of Historic Places, listed as Dundee Lodge.

== Details ==
Located in the foothills of the Northern Oregon Coast Range, the farm is on Dundee Road northwest of the city of Gaston near Henry Hagg Lake in the western part of the county. All three of the buildings on the farm were designed by E. E. Green in a rustic style. The 1 1/2-story structures were all built around 1921 and featuring primarily round logs for the exterior. The buildings also used brick on the exterior. This creates a log cabin look for the symmetrical U-shaped main building. The interior leaves the round logs exposed, with some wood paneling and a brick fireplace.
