= Gaston High School =

Gaston High School may refer to one of these U.S. public schools:

- East Gaston High School, in Mount Holly, North Carolina
- Gaston High School, a former school in Gaston, Indiana, now consolidated into Wes-Del Community Schools
- Gaston High School, a former school in Joinerville, Texas, which is now served by the West Rusk Independent School District
- Gaston High School (Alabama), located in Gadsden, Alabama
- Gaston Junior/Senior High School, Gaston, Oregon
- North Gaston High School, in Dallas, North Carolina
