= Laurelwood Academy =

Location
- 37466 Jasper-Lowell Road; Jasper, Lane County, Oregon 97438; United States; 43°58′36″N 122°52′42″W

Information
- Type: Private
- Religious affiliation: Seventh-day Adventist Church
- Founded: 1904
- Principal: Randy Thornton
- Grades: 9-12
- Enrollment: 43
- Campus: Rural
- Accreditation: NAAS (provisional)
- Website: www.laurelwoodacademy.org/

Laurelwood Academy is a private secondary school affiliated with the Seventh-day Adventist Church near Jasper, Oregon, United States. It is a part of the Seventh-day Adventist education system, the world's second largest Christian school system. Founded in 1904 in Laurelwood, Oregon, the boarding school moved to a new 20-acre (8.1 ha) campus in rural Lane County outside of Eugene in 2007. The school has grades 9 through 12 and focuses on agriculture in addition to academics.

== History ==
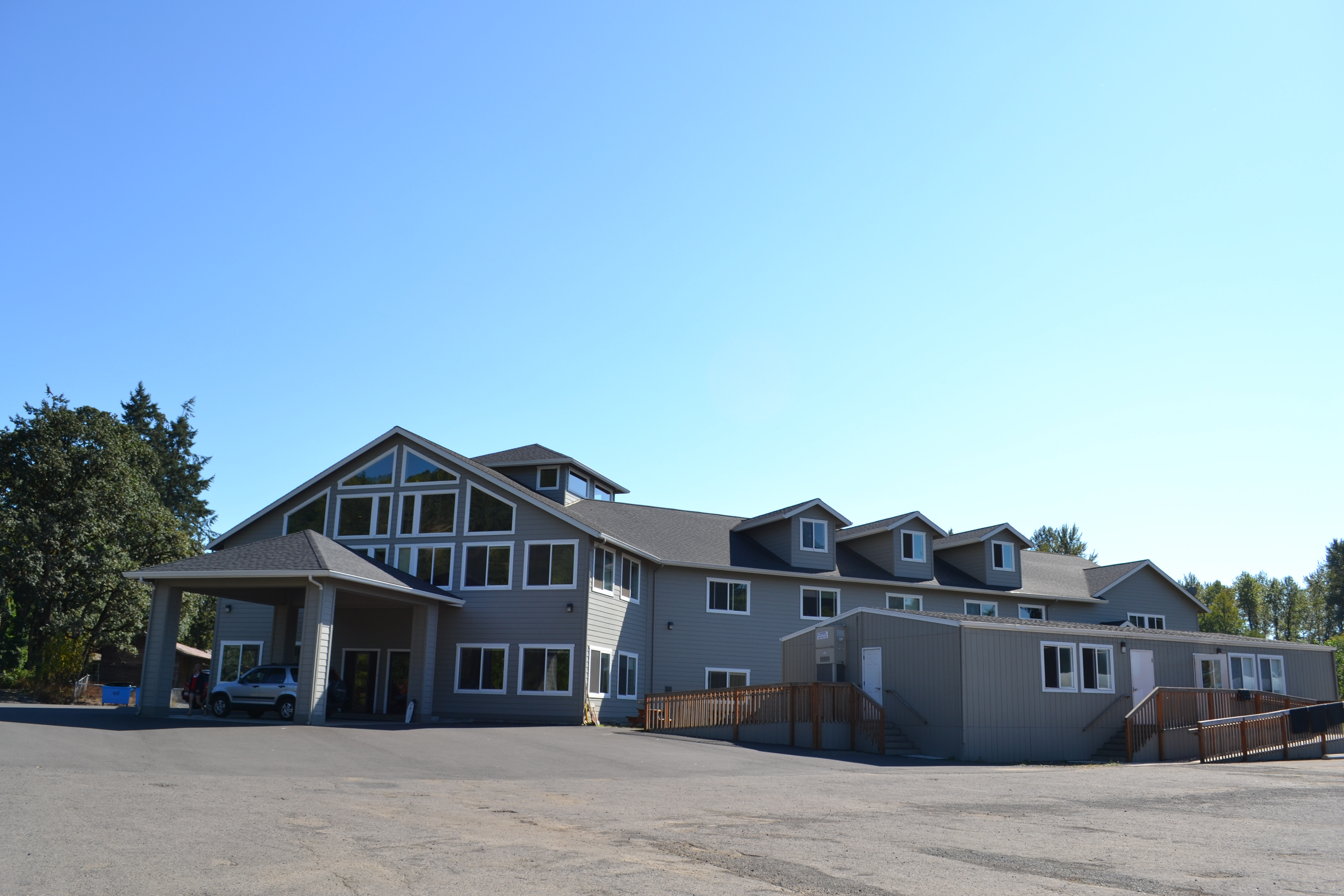
Laurelwood Academy

In 1877, the Seventh-day Adventist Church established a Conference in Oregon, and in 1904 established the Laurelwood Academy at Laurelwood near Gaston. The school was built on the former Donation Land Claim of R. D. Walker with the first building on campus a one-story dining hall. When it opened it had grades one through ten under the direction of principal Robert Arye and an enrollment of 16 students – four girls and 12 boys. The first graduate of the academy was Henry Dirkson in 1906.

Initially built on 5 acres (20,000 m^{2}), the academy purchased more land from Walker in later years. The institution was expanded with the addition of a chapel in 1908 that was subsequently renovated and expanded in 1919. Principal Arye left the school in 1907 and J. L. Kay became the principal, expanding the curriculum to twelve grades. The academy added a building for teaching manual labor in 1925 followed by a new administration structure in 1943. In 1950, the unaffiliated but adjacent Laurelwood Adventist Elementary School opened. Adventist owned Harris Pine Mills had a furniture making plant across the street that provided some employment to students after it opened in 1965.

By 1976 the four-year academy grew to as large as 350 students. In 1976, Charles Hanson was the principal and the school had dormitories, a science building, gymnasium, and an administration building. The companion elementary school had an enrollment of around 115 students at this same time. Laurelwood Academy was closed in 1985 after enrollment had declined at the schools of the Oregon Conference of Seventh-day Adventists.

In 1988, the Oregon Conference sold the 430-acre (1.7 km^{2}) academy to a private group run by alumni of the school for $1.5 million. The school also owned stands of timber and other agricultural property, as well as a furniture production facility leased to Harris Pine Mills that closed in 1986. When sold, the school had more than a dozen private residences, three academic buildings, two residence halls, and the gymnasium. In September 1988, the company that bought the campus re-opened Laurelwood Academy with 40 students under the direction of principal Harold Clark.

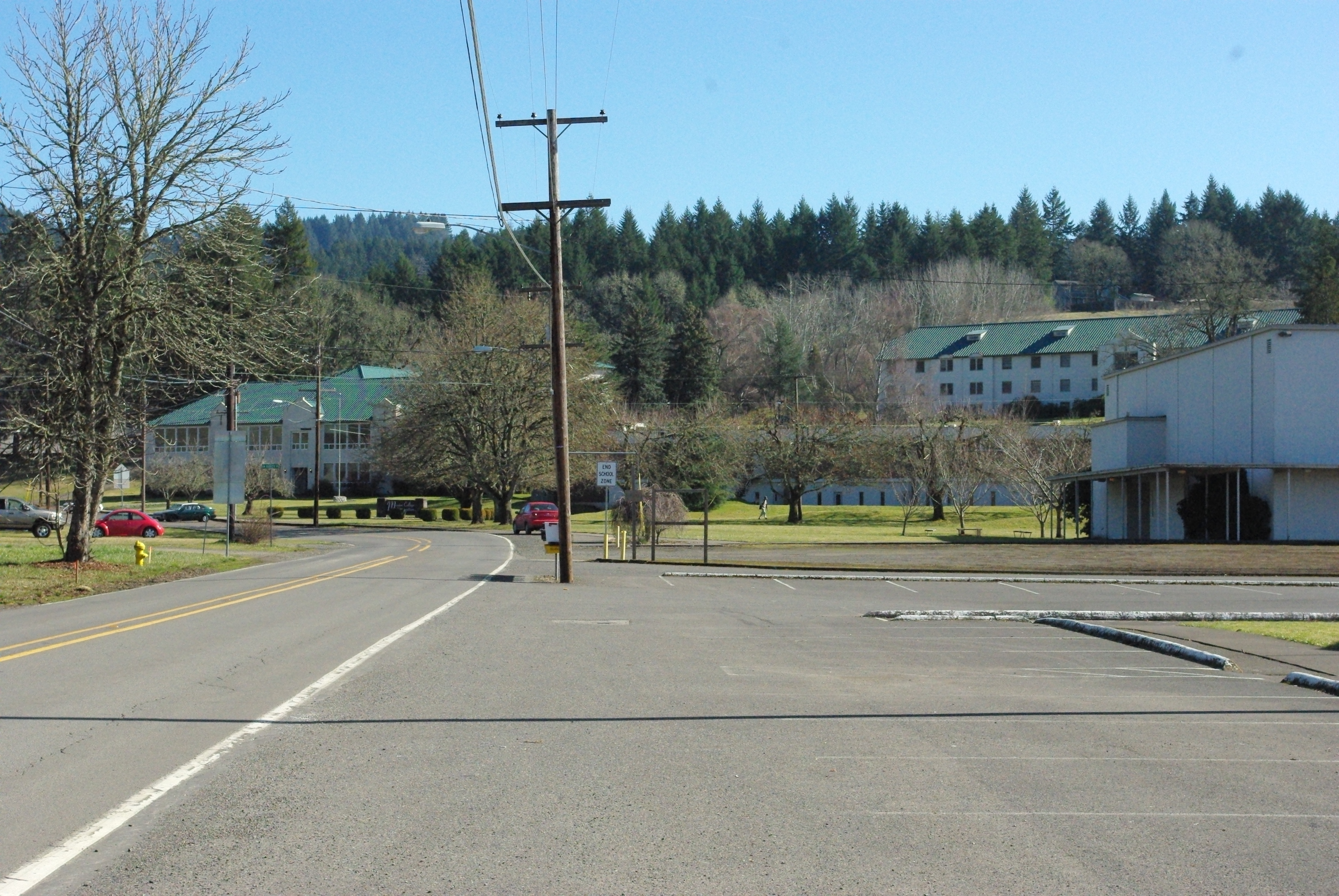
Former campus

Enrollment increased to around 90 students by 1996, and was around 80 in 2001. In 2007, the school re-located to the Eugene, Oregon, area after enrollment was at 90 students. The new campus on Jasper-Lowell Road opened that year on a 20-acre (81,000 m^{2}) piece of property with 19 students. The land was donated to the academy by the McDougal Foundation. Laurelwood Seventh-day Adventist Elementary School still operates in Laurelwood, and now has enrollment of about 20, in grades 1 through 8 while the former academy buildings there housed the Mission College of Evangelism for a few years. The former grounds in Laurelwood were sold to the religious group Ananda in May 2011.

== Academics ==
The academy enrolled students in grades 9 through 12 at the boarding school. Laurelwood was provisionally accredited by the Northwest Association of Accredited Schools. In addition to academics, students also learned manual labor by farming on the campus. Agriculture and business were the primary educational focuses of Laurelwood Academy. Laurelwood is an affiliate of Outpost Centers International.

== See also ==
- List of Seventh-day Adventist secondary schools
- Seventh-day Adventist education
