= Gaston–Strong House =

Historic building in Portland, Oregon, U.S.

- U.S. National Register of Historic Places
- U.S. Historic district – Contributing property
- Portland Historic Landmark
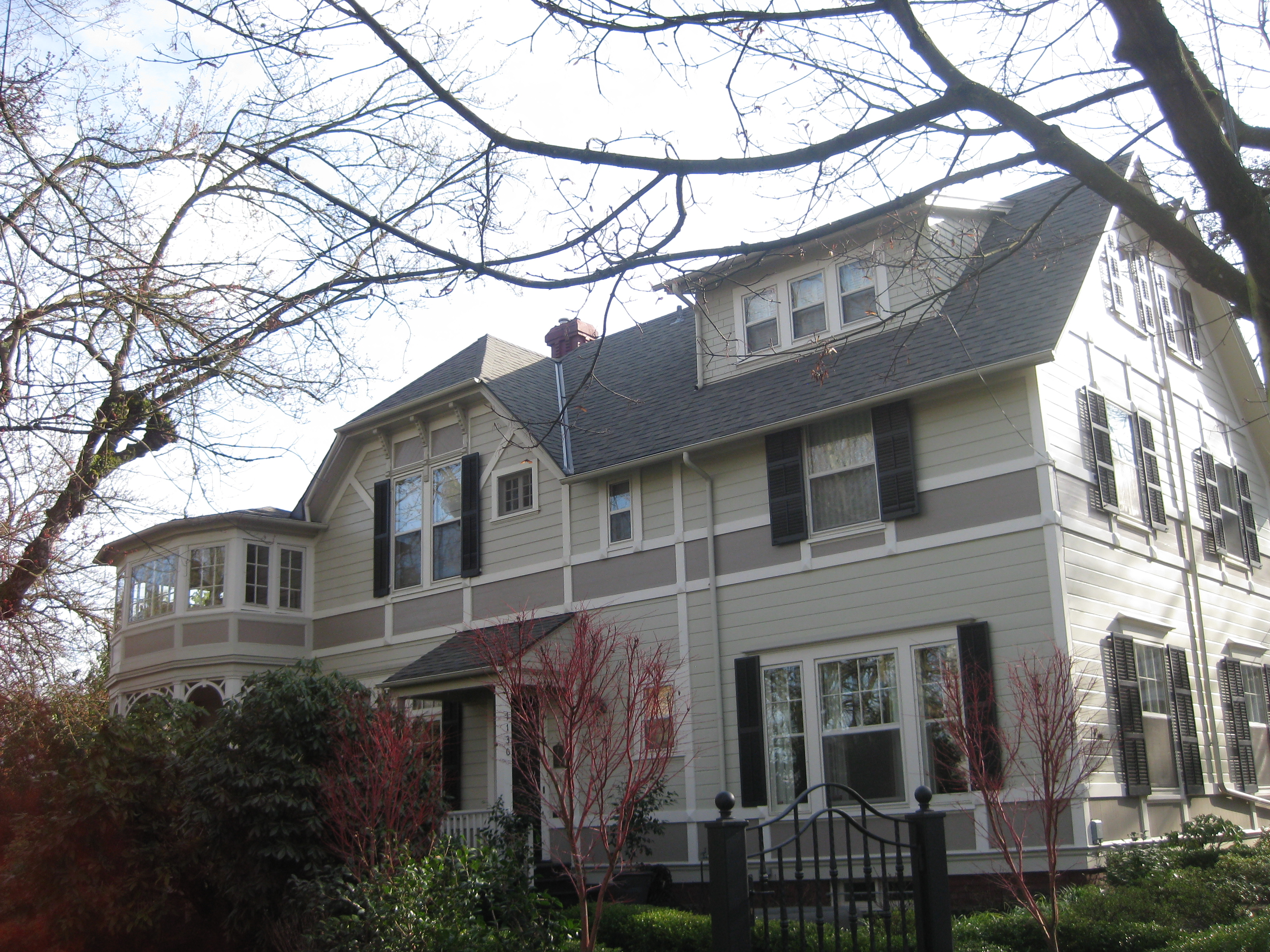
- The house's exterior in 2010

- Location within Portland, Oregon Location within Oregon Location within the United States
- Location: 1130 SW King Avenue; Portland, Oregon
- Coordinates: 45°31′12″N 122°41′43″W
- Area: 0.1 acres (0.040 ha)
- Built: 1892
- Architect: A. E. Doyle
- Architectural style: Stick/Eastlake, Arts and Crafts
- Part of: King's Hill Historic District (ID91000039)
- NRHP reference No.: 90000292
- Added to NRHP: February 23, 1990

The Gaston–Strong House is a house located in southwest Portland, Oregon listed on the National Register of Historic Places. An early resident was Joseph P. Gaston.

== See also ==
- National Register of Historic Places listings in Southwest Portland, Oregon
