= Joseph P. Gaston =

American journalist

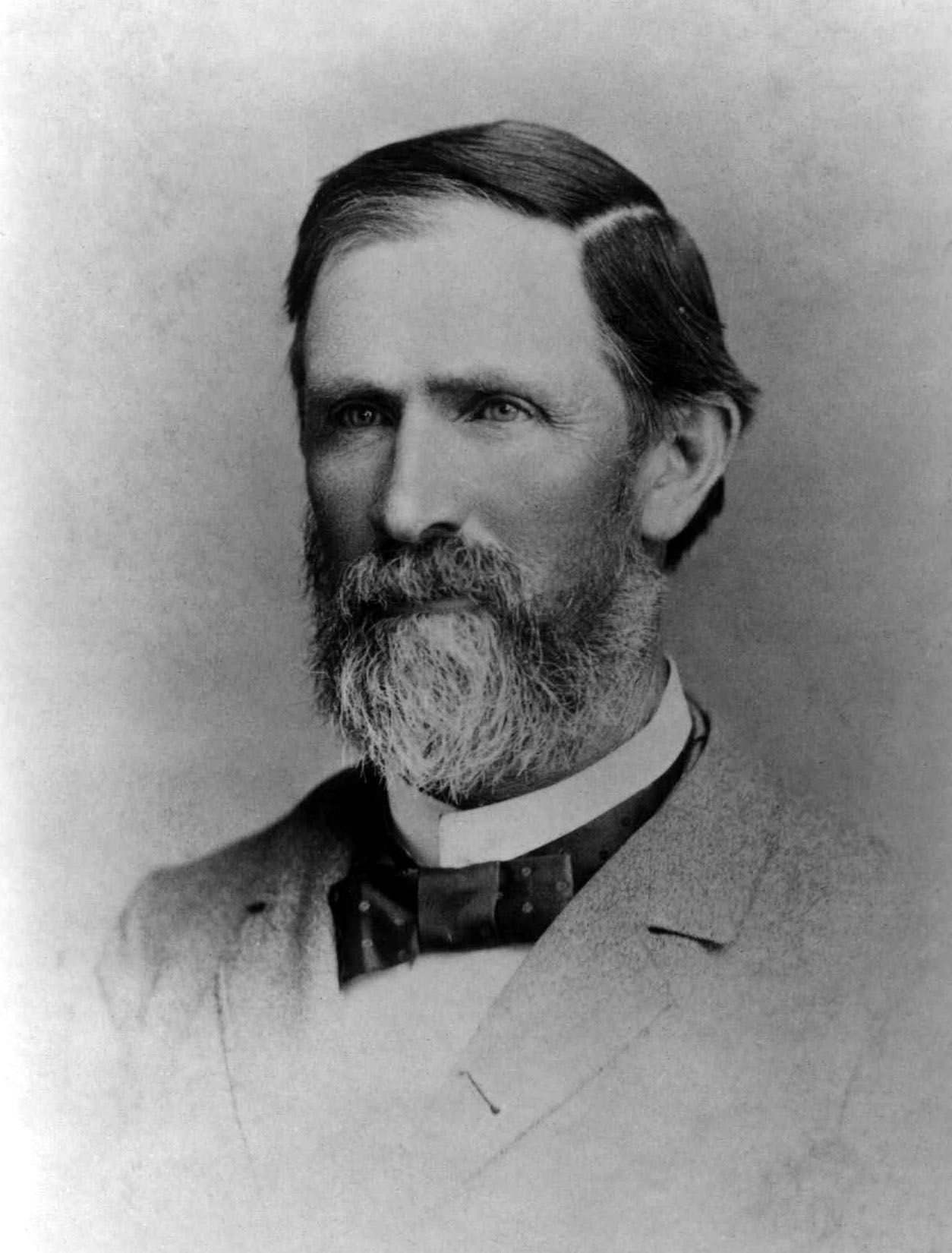
- Born: November 14, 1833; St. Clairsville, Ohio
- Died: July 20, 1913 (aged 79); Pasadena, California
- Resting place: Greenwood Hills Cemetery; Portland, Oregon; 45.460780°N 122.679375°W
- Occupations: Lawyer; Journalist; Railroad executive Historian
- Years active: 1864 – 1913
- Known for: Oregon Central Railroad
- Notable work: Portland, Oregon, Its History and Builders; The Centennial History of Oregon, 1811 to 1911
- Spouse: Narcissa Jones
- Children: Mary Gaston

Joseph P. Gaston (November 14, 1833 – July 20, 1913) was an American railroad executive, journalist, and historian based in Oregon. He is remembered as the namesake of Gaston, Oregon, the Joseph Gaston House, and the Gaston-Strong House. Gaston was the first president of the Oregon Central Railroad and an outspoken opponent of railroad executive Ben Holladay. He authored the three-volume Portland, Oregon, Its History and Builders and the four-volume The Centennial History of Oregon, 1811 to 1911.

== Early life and relatives ==
Gaston was born in St. Clairsville, Ohio, in 1833 to parents Joseph Gaston and Nancy Fowler. He was raised in the home of his maternal grandmother, Jean Fowler. He worked on the family farm, attending school during winter sessions. When he was 16, he began teaching school and later worked in a saw mill.

Gaston's grand-uncle, William Gaston, had been chief justice of the Supreme Court of North Carolina and founder of Gaston, North Carolina. His cousin, William Gaston, served as Governor of Massachusetts.

== Law practice ==
Gaston read law in St. Clairsville, and in 1856 he was admitted to practice in the Ohio Courts of Common Pleas. He immigrated to Oregon in 1862 and practiced law in Jacksonville. Congress had enacted the Pacific Railway Act of 1862, and Gaston became interested in surveying the route of rail traffic north from the California border.

At this time Gaston also served as editor of Jacksonville's Oregon Sentinel, a newspaper founded by William G. T'Vault.

== Oregon and Central Railroad ==
In 1863 the California and Columbia River Railroad, a company founded in Marysville, California, sent surveyors north to map a route from Marysville to Portland. A dispute regarding both the route and its financing erupted between surveyors Simon G. Elliott and George H. Beldon, and the survey party disbanded in Jacksonville. Gaston agreed to continue the survey and hired Beldon and A. C. Barry to complete the route from Jacksonville north to Portland. As a result of the Barry survey, Congress enacted the Oregon and California Railroad Act in the mid-1860s that allowed the Oregon Legislature to award land grants and subsidies to a railroad that could complete the work. The Oregon Central Railroad was formed by Gaston, Jesse Applegate, Joel Palmer, William S. Ladd, and other investors for this purpose.

Barry's route followed the west side of Oregon's Willamette Valley, but it was not the only proposed route. Gaston became involved in a lengthy dispute with Simon Elliott and Ben Holladay, railroad builders who favored an east Willamette Valley route, and Holladay eventually gained control of the federal land grants. Later, Gaston tried unsuccessfully to obtain a separate land grant from Congress, and he was eventually forced to sell his interest in the railroad to Holladay.

During this time, Gaston also served as editor of the Statesman Journal in Salem, Oregon. From 1874 to 1875, he served as editor the Portland Daily Bulletin, and it is not known whether Gaston's interest in journalism was to promote his railroad plans.

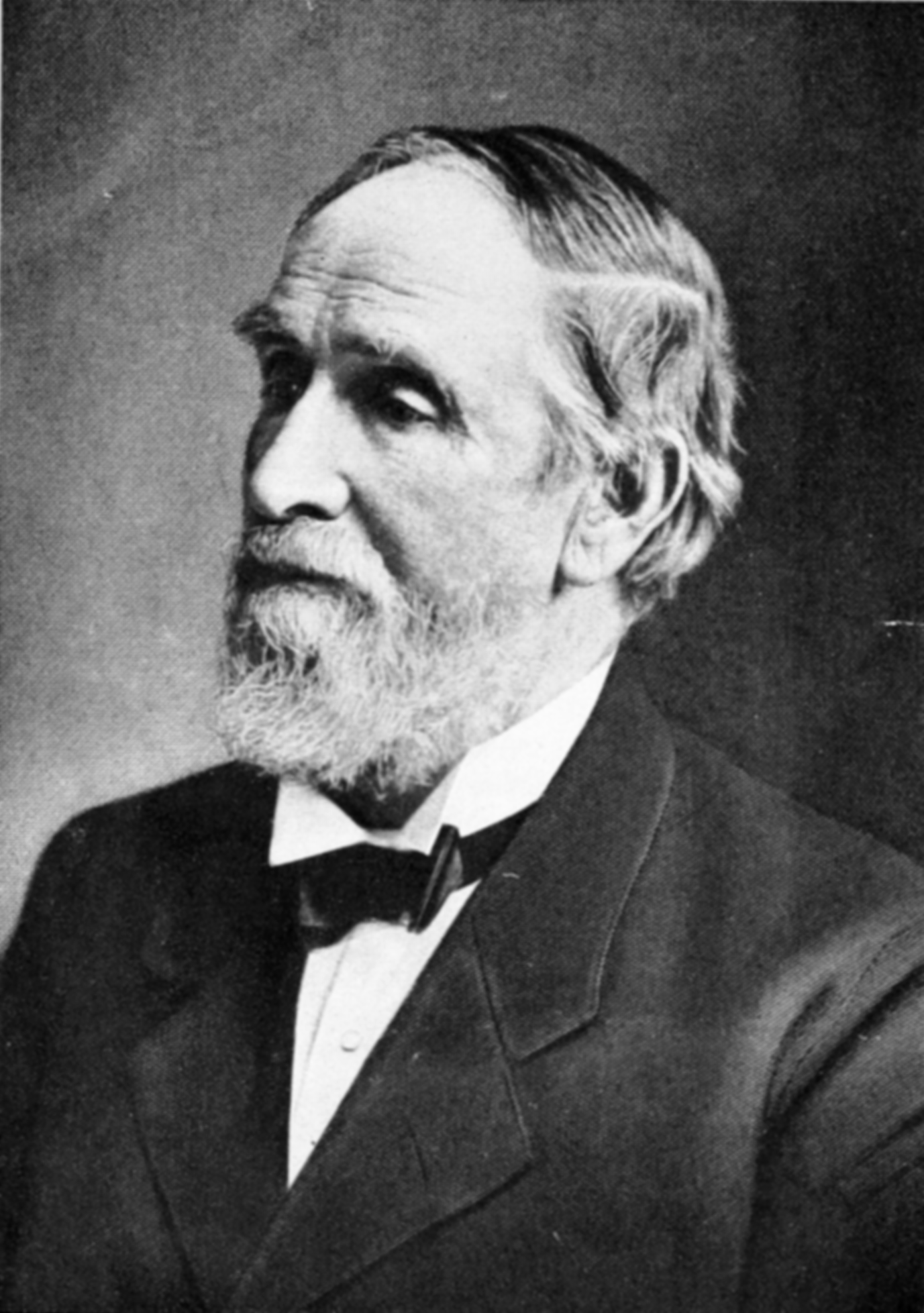
Gaston as depicted on the frontispiece of his Portland, Oregon: Its History...

== Gaston, Oregon ==
In 1875 Gaston bought a farm in Washington County, Oregon. He drained Wapato Lake to reclaim 1000 acres of farmland, donating land for both a school and a church to the surrounding community. The town was named Gaston in his honor. He returned to Portland in 1896.

== Histories ==
In the 1890s, Gaston began working on two major works of history and biography. His writing was not always unbiased, especially in the case of railroad executive Ben Holladay. He published the massive Portland, Oregon: Its History and Builders in 1911 and The Centennial History of Oregon in 1912.

== Death ==
Gaston sold his house and moved to Pasadena, California, in 1913 in a hope that the health of his daughter Mary would improve. He became ill and died unexpectedly soon after the journey.

== See also ==
- Oregon and California Railroad Revested Lands
