= Cherry Grove, Oregon =

Unincorporated community in the state of Oregon, United States

Cherry Grove
- Unincorporated community
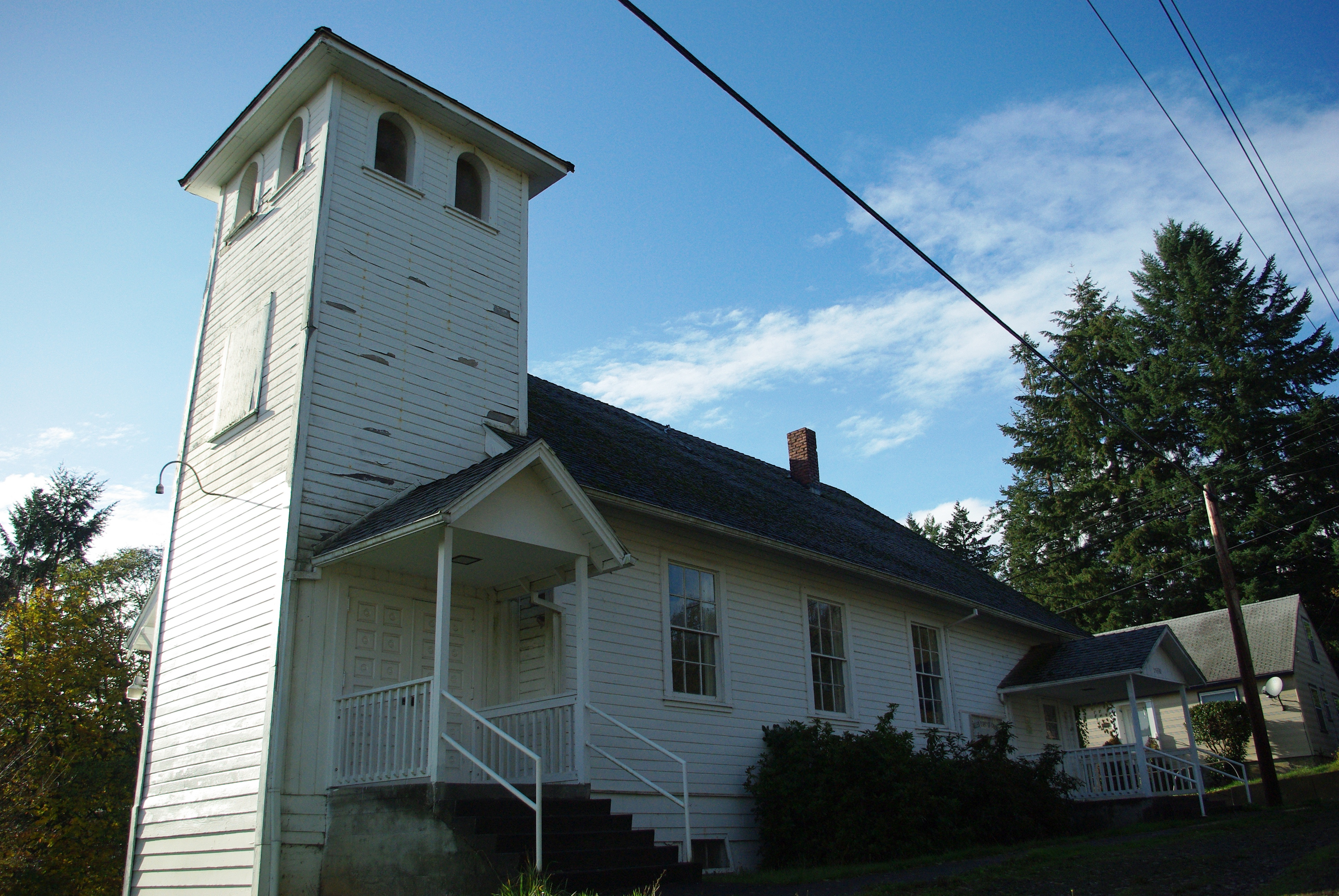
- A church in the community

- Location within the state of Oregon Cherry Grove (the United States)
- Coordinates: 45°27′05″N 123°15′00″W
- Country: United States
- State: Oregon
- County: Washington

Area
  - Total: 1.08 sq mi (2.80 km^{2})
  - Land: 1.08 sq mi (2.80 km^{2})
  - Water: 0 sq mi (0.00 km^{2})
- Elevation: 433 ft (132 m)

Population (2020)
  - Total: 503
  - Density: 464.7/sq mi (179.43/km^{2})
- Time zone: UTC-8 (Pacific (PST))
  - Summer (DST): UTC-7 (PDT)
- ZIP code: 97119
- Area codes: 503 and 971
- FIPS code: 41-12850
- GNIS feature ID: 2812899

Cherry Grove is an unincorporated community in Washington County, Oregon, United States. Cherry Grove is situated on the north bank of the Tualatin River near where it exits the Northern Oregon Coast Range and enters Patton Valley.

As of the 2020 census, Cherry Grove had a population of 503.

== History ==
Cherry Grove was founded by Swedish immigrant August Lovegren in 1911. He had previously operated a lumber mill in Preston, Washington, after arriving in the United States in 1883. He wanted a name for the community that was connected with fruit growing, but his choice of "Appleton" was already taken by a place in Oregon. His cousin then suggested the name of her home of Cherry Grove, Minnesota.

Lovegren established a sawmill in the community and in September 1911 began operating a private electricity grid in Cherry Grove. He used the sawmill's boiler in the operation, and in September 1913 completed a dam on the Tualatin River to create a large log retention pond. In January 1914, a flood destroyed both the dam and the boiler, leaving the community without electricity until Portland General Electric added service in 1935. Cherry Grove's post office ran from 1912 through 1959 when service was transferred to Gaston.

== Demographics ==
Historical population
Census	Pop.	Note	%±
2020	503		—
U.S. Decennial Census
