= Joseph Gaston House =

Historic building in Portland, Oregon, U.S.

- U.S. National Register of Historic Places
- Portland Historic Landmark
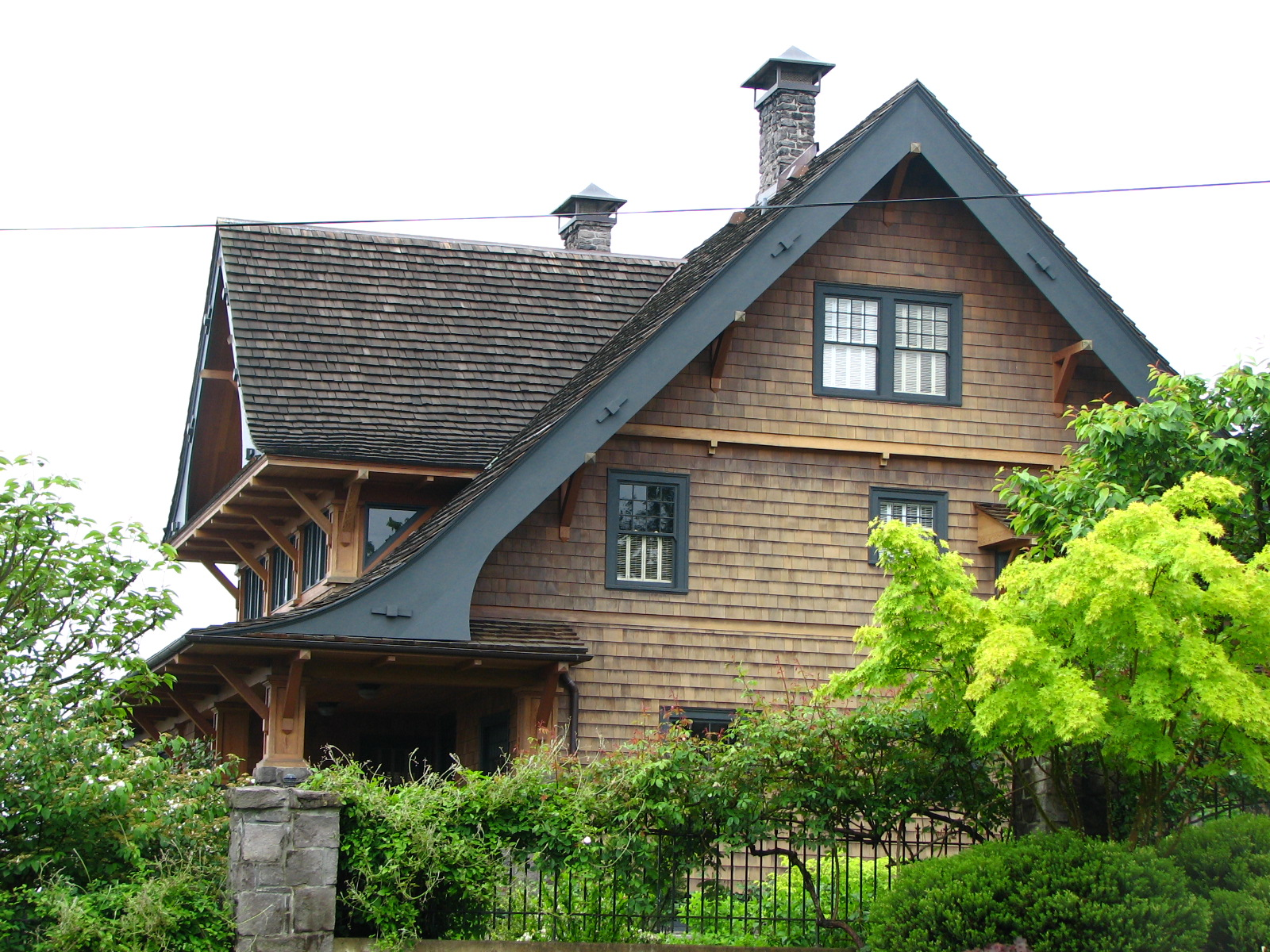
- Joseph Gaston House in 2008

- Location within Portland, Oregon Location within Oregon Location within the United States
- Location: 1960 SW 16th Avenue; Portland, Oregon
- Coordinates: 45°30′43″N 122°41′34″W
- Built: 1911
- Architect: William C. Knighton
- Architectural style: Bungalow/Craftsman
- NRHP reference No.: 89000052
- Added to NRHP: February 21, 1989

The Joseph Gaston House is a house located in southwest Portland, Oregon listed on the National Register of Historic Places. It is located in the southernmost part of the Goose Hollow neighborhood. The house was named for Joseph P. Gaston and is also known as the Gaston-Holman House.

== See also ==
- National Register of Historic Places listings in Southwest Portland, Oregon
