= Wapato Lake =

Lake in Oregon, United States

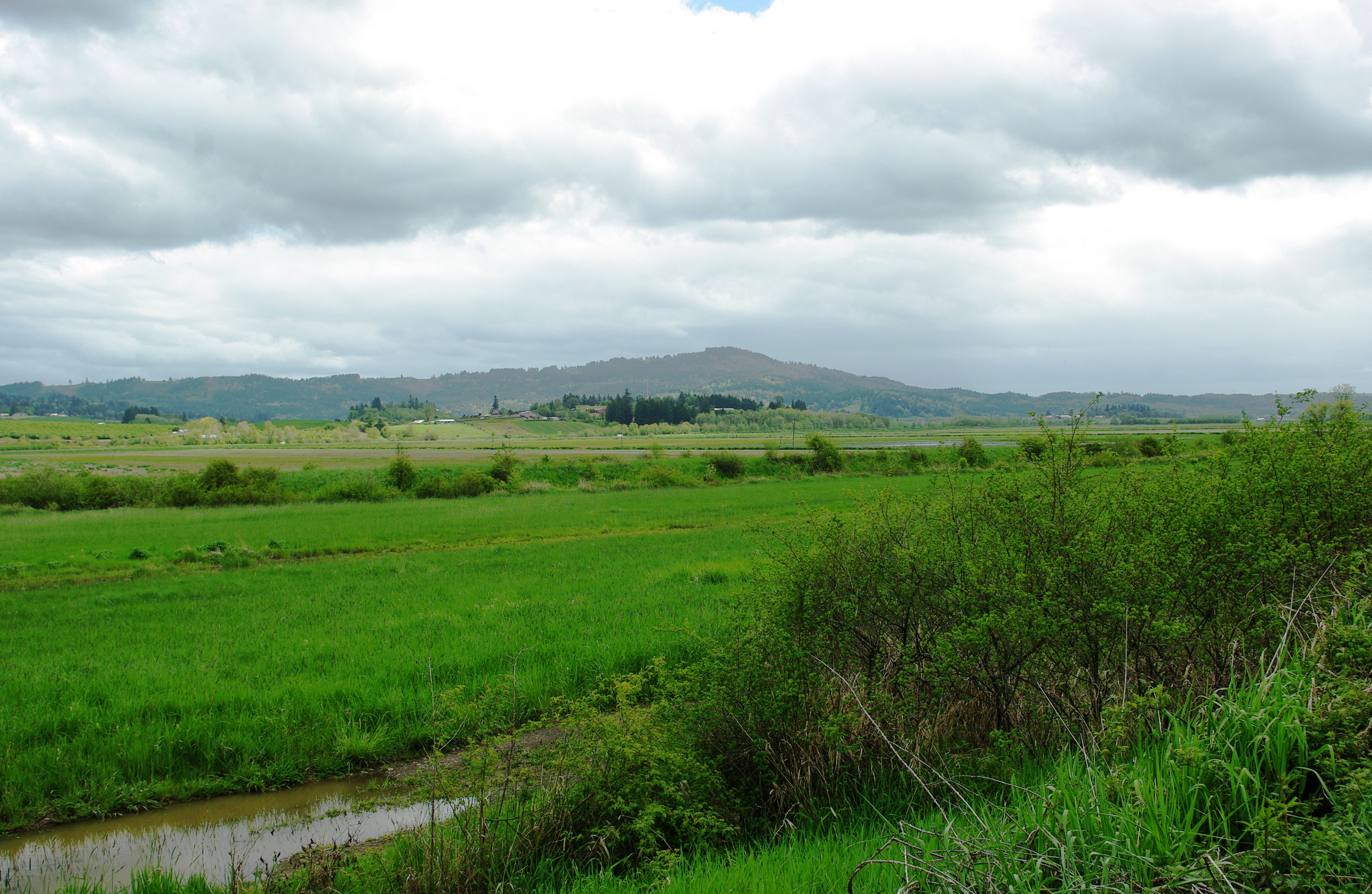
Former lake bed

Wapato Lake is a restored historic lake located in what became parts of Washington County and Yamhill County in the U.S. state of Oregon. The area was sometimes known as Wapato Lake Bed and Wapato Flat. The lake is located about a half mile east of Gaston at 55 metres (180 ft) elevation. The lake bed soils contain a layer of organic peat that once supported a wetland community dominated by the wapato plant, Sagittaria latifolia, particularly in the upper marsh areas. Wapato plants were reintroduced to the restored lake by tribal people from the Confederated Tribes of the Grand Ronde Community in preparation for the opening of the Wapato Lake National Wildlife Refuge in March 2023.

== History ==
Prior to the arrival of settlers, the Tualatin Indians had used the lake for a winter settlement. They had 23 permanent villages centered on the lake. This band of Native Americans negotiated with the government to retain a small reservation at the lake in 1851, but the treaty was never approved by Congress with the band relegated to the Grand Ronde reservation by an 1855 treaty. The lake area was 800 to 1,500 acres (320 to 610 ha) before it was drained in the mid-1930s by the Wapato Improvement District—created by local landowners—which installed ditches, dikes, and drainage tiles to increase available farmland, primarily for cultivation of onions. The main irrigation ditch was named the Gaston Ditch. In 2002, the United States Fish and Wildlife Service began studying the area for an expansion to the Tualatin River National Wildlife Refuge located about 15 miles (24 km) to the east. The service created the Wapato Lake Unit in 2007, and plan to add up to 4,300 acres (17 km^{2}) to the refuge around Wapato Lake as well as eventually restore the lake. As of September, 2009, the U.S. Fish and Wildlife Service had purchased 350 acres (140 ha) to add to an initial 140 acres (57 ha) the government owned prior to the establishment of the Wapato Lake Unit. In December 2013, the Wapato Lake National Wildlife Refuge was carved out of the Tualatin River National Wildlife Refuge with an initial boundary of 4,310 acres (1,740 ha).

== Wapato Lake National Wildlife Refuge ==
Wapato Lake National Wildlife Refuge
- Location within Oregon
- Location: Washington and Yamhill Counties, Oregon, USA
- Nearest city: Gaston, Oregon
- Coordinates: 45°25′08″N 123°07′23″W
- Area: 4,310 acres (1,744 ha)
- Established: March 18, 2023
- Governing body: U.S. Fish and Wildlife Service
- Website: Wapato Lake NWR

Wapato Lake Unit is located about 15 miles (24 km) to the west of the main refuge, near the city of Gaston along Oregon Route 47 in Washington and Yamhill counties. The area was once the site of Wapato Lake, whose soil held an organic-rich peat that sustained a shrub swamp ecosystem. The wapato plant (Sagittaria latifolia) grew in the upper marsh of the Wapato Lake Basin and was harvested by Native Americans. In 1892, attempts began to drain the 800 acres (320 ha) lake to increase farmland, with the Wapato Improvement District completing the effort in the 1930s. Valley forests, prairies, and wetlands encompass the region today, including two small streams, Ayers and Wapato creeks.

The government had hoped to add land in the Gaston area to the main refuge, but initially met resistance from local residents. Some residents later asked the government to buy their land for the refuge in 2000. By 2002, up to 6,400 acres (2,600 ha) were being studied in that area for inclusion into the wildlife refuge as part of the then uncreated unit. At that time the Fish and Wildlife Service owned 108 acres (44 ha) in the area, with plans to restore the lake if the unit was established. In March 2007, the Service approved the creation of the Wapato Lake Unit with a boundary encompassing 4,310 possible acres (17.4 km^{2}). In June 2008, the Wapato Lake Unit purchased its first sets of properties. Totaling 180 acres (73 ha) from three properties, the Fish and Wildlife Service paid $631,000 for the land using a grant from the Migratory Bird Conservation Commission. An additional 15 acres (6.1 ha) were added in September. Plans called for restoring the farmland back to its natural state and acquiring all land by 2011.

On March 18, 2023, the Wapato Lake National Wildlife Refuge was officially opened to the public in a ceremony at Gaston High School. Members of the Grand Ronde Reservation opened the ceremony with a traditional song and drum performance. The tribe announced that for the first time in generations, Wapato has been replanted in the newly restored Wapato Lake. The refuge features 2.85 miles of walking trails around the north and west shores of the lake. River otter, beaver, great blue heron, and many species of migratory birds can be observed at the Refuge.
