= Gaston Junior/Senior High School =

Public school in Gaston, Oregon, United States

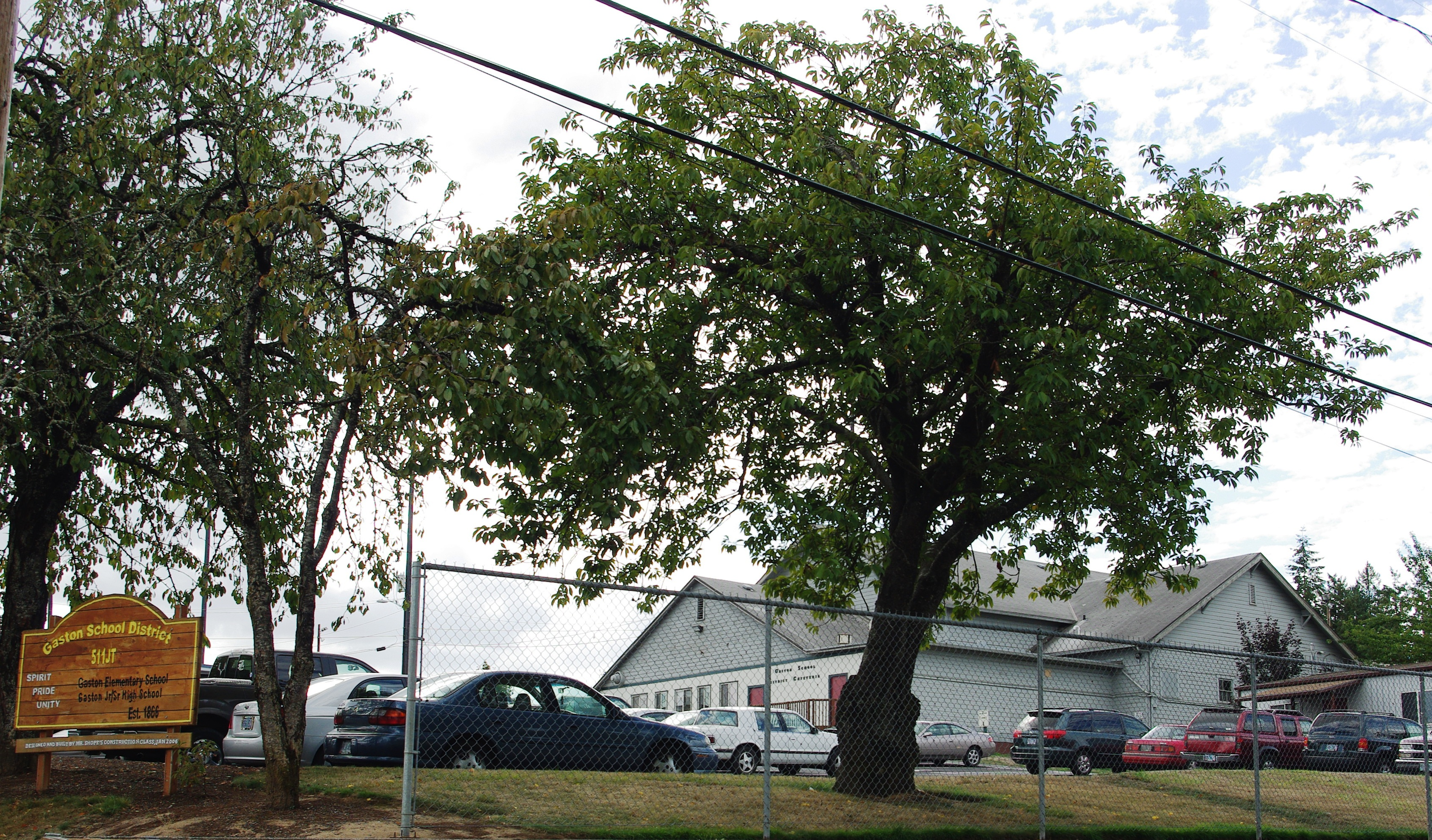

Location
- 304 Park Street; Gaston, (Washington County), Oregon 97119; United States; 45°26′08″N 123°08′35″W

Information
- Type: Public
- School district: Gaston School District
- Principal: Summer Catino
- Grades: 7-12
- Enrollment: 246 (2024–2025)
- Colors: Green and gold
- Athletics conference: OSAA Northwest League 2A-1
- Mascot: Greyhound
- Team name: Gaston Greyhounds
- Website: Gaston Jr/Sr High website

Gaston Junior/Senior High School is a public high school in Gaston, Oregon, United States.

== Academics ==
In 2008, 78% of the high school's seniors received their high school diploma. Of 45 students, 35 graduated, five dropped out, and five were still in high school the following year.
