= Gaston School District =

School district in Oregon, United States

Gaston School District 11J is a public school district in Washington County, Oregon, United States serving the city of Gaston. The district was established about 1852 and later the Wapato (511J) and Yamhill (555J) districts in neighboring Yamhill County merged into the district. It is a two-school district, consisting of Gaston Elementary School and Gaston Junior/Senior High School. Both the schools and the district offices share a single campus in the center of Gaston, bordered on the north side by Park Street and on the East side by 3rd Street.

The elementary school mascot is the Pups.

== Demographics ==
In the 2009 school year, the district had 13 students classified as homeless by the Department of Education, or 2.7% of students in the district.
