= Gaston, Oregon =

- City
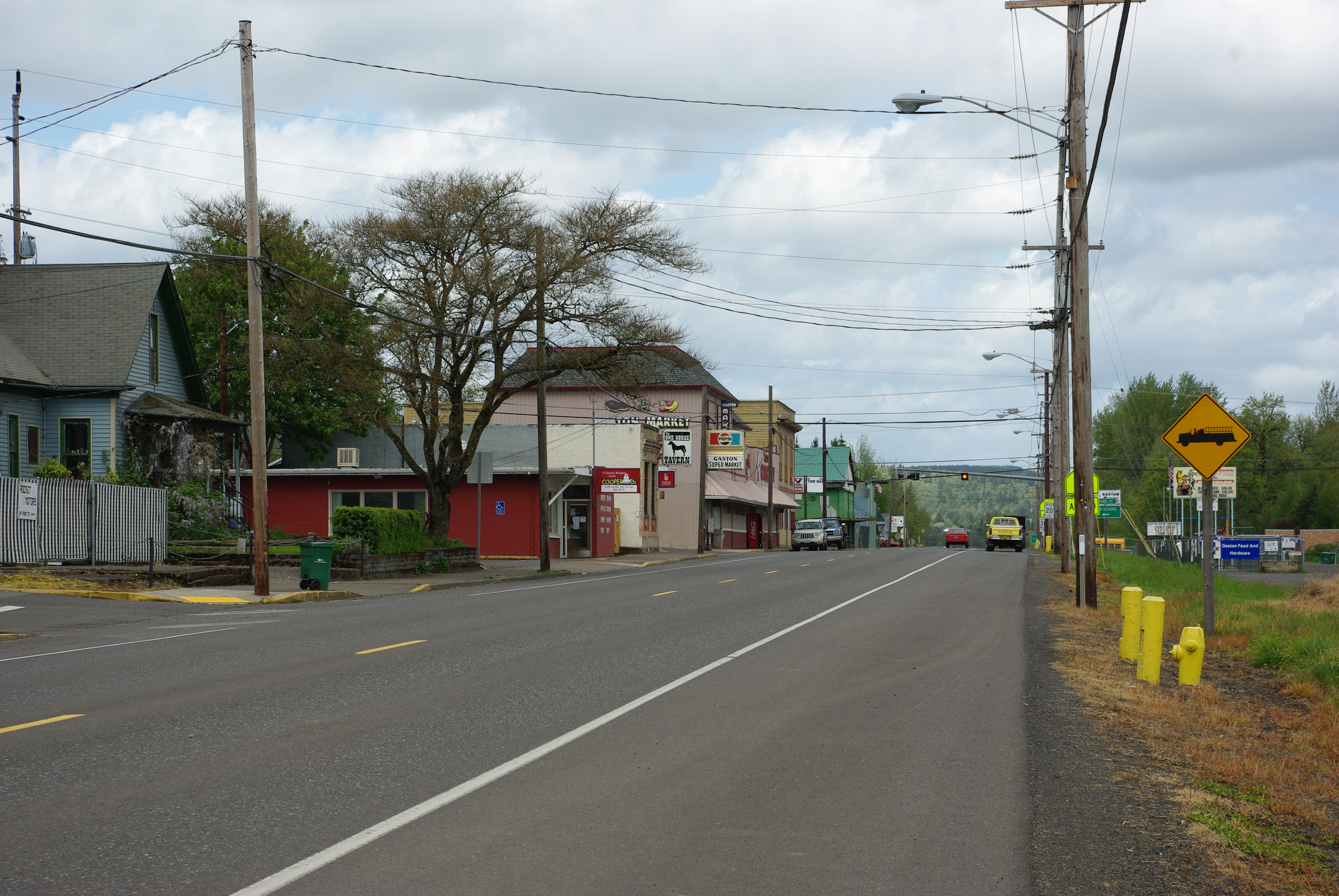

- Location in Oregon

- Location in the United States
- Coordinates: 45°26′06″N 123°08′42″W
- Country: United States
- State: Oregon
- County: Washington
- Incorporated: 1914
- Named for: Joseph Gaston

Government
  - Mayor: David Meeker

Area
  - Total: 0.34 sq mi (0.88 km^{2})
  - Land: 0.34 sq mi (0.88 km^{2})
  - Water: 0 sq mi (0.00 km^{2})
- Elevation: 299 ft (91 m)

Population (2020)
  - Total: 676
  - Density: 1,979.9/sq mi (764.43/km^{2})
- Time zone: UTC-8 (Pacific)
  - Summer (DST): UTC-7 (Pacific)
- ZIP code: 97119
- Area codes: 503 and 971
- FIPS code: 41-28100
- GNIS feature ID: 2410575
- Website: https://www.cityofgaston.com

Gaston is a city in Washington County, Oregon, United States. Located between Forest Grove to the north and Yamhill to the south, the city straddles Oregon Route 47 and borders the Tualatin River. It is named after railroad executive Joseph Gaston. As of the 2020 census, Gaston had a population of 676.

== History ==
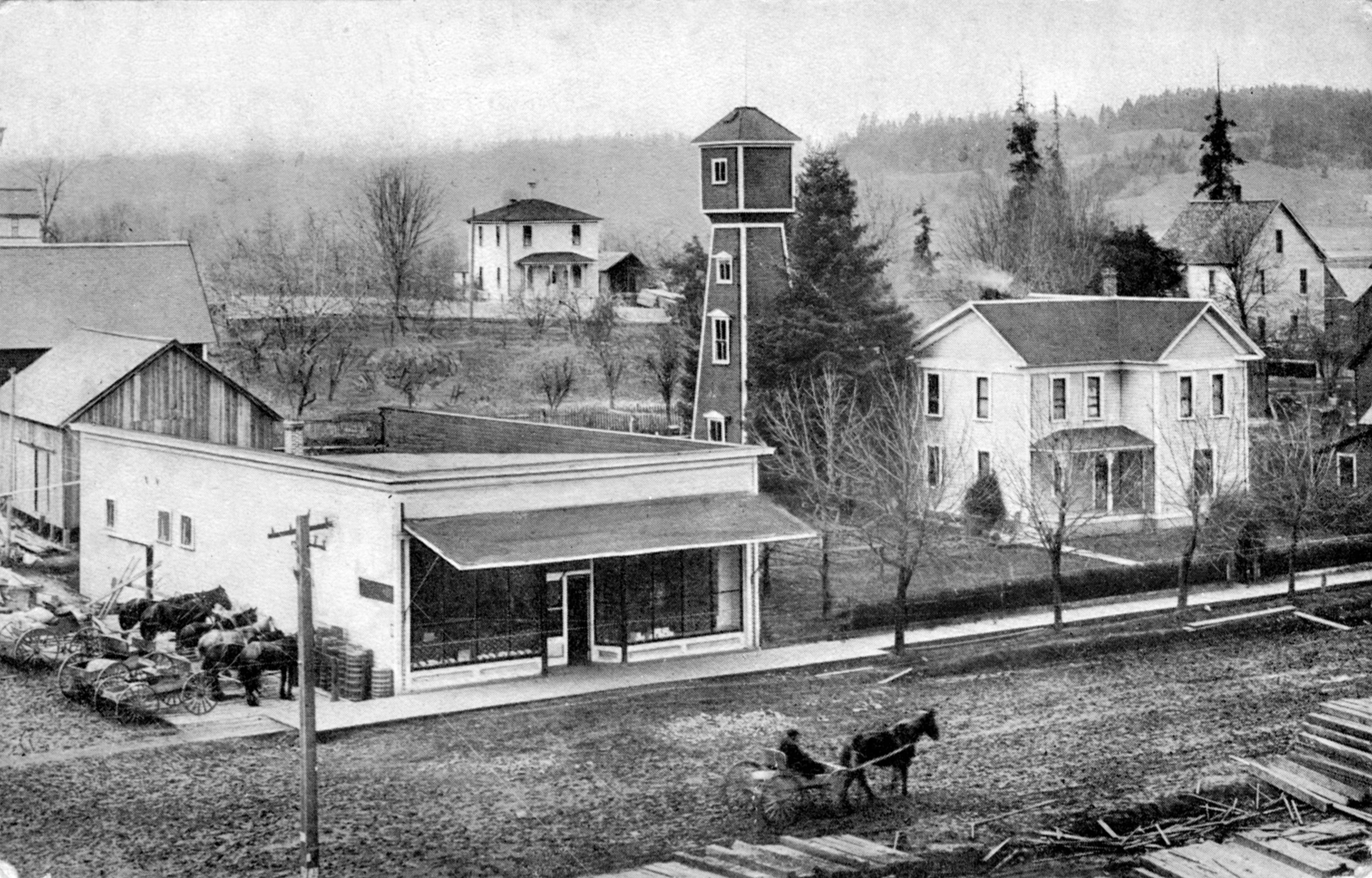
Main Street, 1910

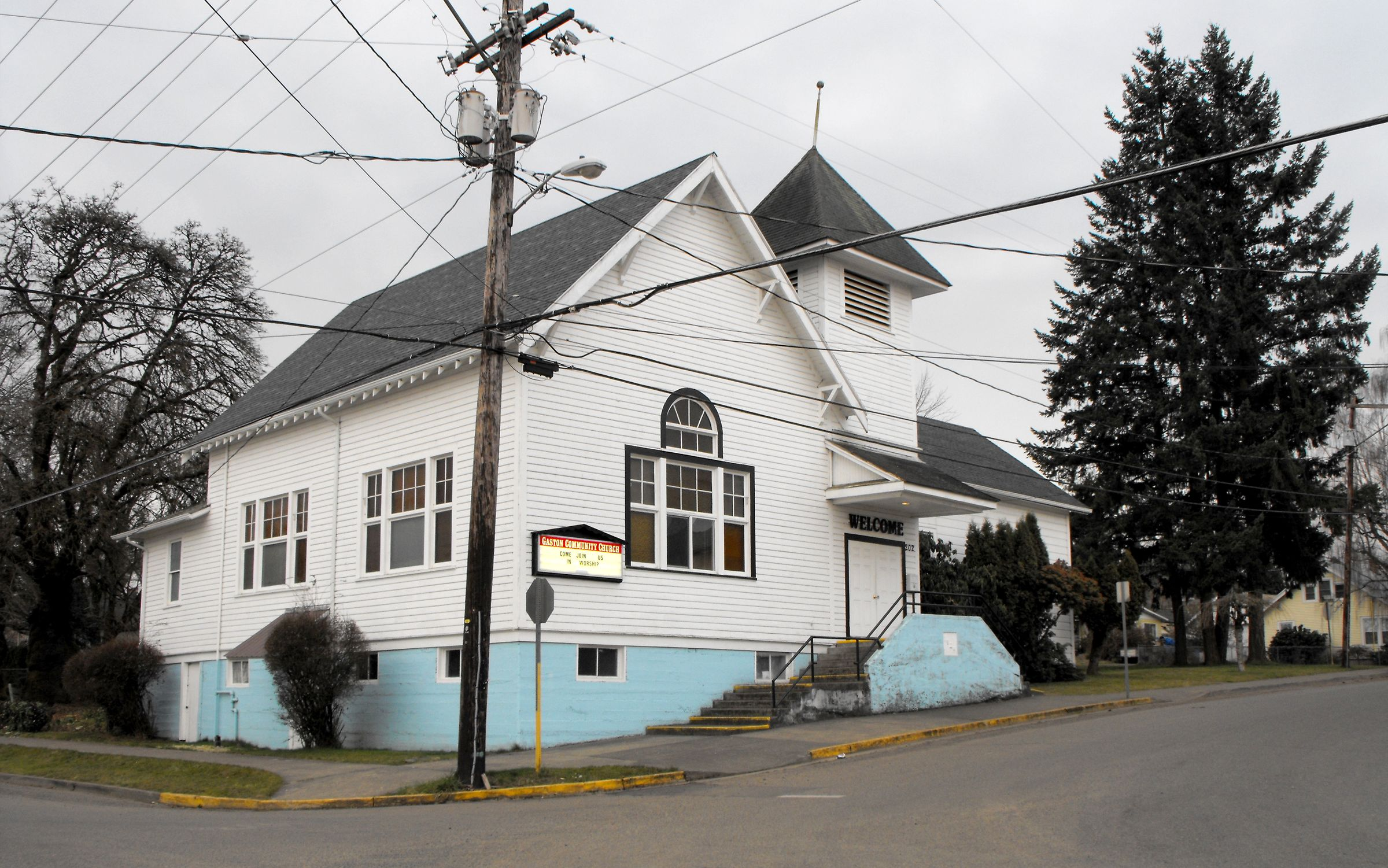
Gaston community church

The first known inhabitants of the Tualatin Valley were the Atfalati tribe, a subset of the Kalapuya ethnic group. Contact with Europeans in the late 1700s led to the spread of smallpox and other diseases, which devastated the Atfalati population. In 1851, due to population pressures from white settlers, surviving members of the tribe negotiated a treaty with the Oregon Territory ceding their ancestral lands throughout the Tualatin Valley to guarantee a small reservation on the banks of nearby Wapato Lake. This treaty was never ratified, and in the late 1850s, the U.S. government relocated the tribe to the Grand Ronde Reservation.

Large-scale American settlement of the region began in the 1850s, due to the Donation Land Claim Act, which granted land to white settlers who moved to the Oregon Territory before 1855. In the 1870s, the West Side Railroad was built from Hillsboro to Corvallis, cutting through this region. The community of Gaston developed from a railroad stop in 1872 to a commercial center, hosting a school, post office, hotel, and blacksmith shop. Due to legal disputes, Joseph Gaston left his position at the railroad and moved to the region in 1880. He spent the next sixteen years attempting to drain Wapato Lake for farmland.

The nearby community of Cherry Grove was founded in 1911 as a logging hub and briefly eclipsed Gaston. Gaston was formally incorporated in 1914. By 1916, the town possessed a general store, bank, and other enterprises. In early May 1935 workers at the Stimson Mill went on strike. On May 22, activists left the Labor Temple in Portland to support the strikers. The next morning Oregon governor Charles Martin ordered the state police and National Guard to protect the strikebreakers. Armed with gas grenades and machine guns, the military and police forces demanded the strikers leave or be shot. The strikers chose to disperse, averting a potential bloodbath.

=== New high school ===
In 1915 a new high school was built on the land Joseph Gaston had previously set aside for a school. That high school was in use through the 1986–87 school year, when it was condemned. The condemning of the building became a crucial local issue for the town, with residents split between merging with a nearby district (both Forest Grove or Yamhill were considered), and building a new high school. In the end, a new high school was built and Gaston retained its independent school system and with it a degree of local pride. Currently the Gaston School District is a full K–12 district, with 525 students total in 2007, and a single high school.

=== Modern expansion ===
The growing popularity of Portland and the Pacific Northwest in general has led to population growth throughout the region. Though too far from Portland to benefit much at first, recently Gaston has started to see new housing and an uptick in school registrations. The late 1980s brought a new fire station and the 1990s baseball/softball-oriented park. Just after 2000, a new post office was built on the edge of town. Thus far, the town has not been able to effectively capitalize on the local wine industry's growing national and international recognition. In 2006, the mayoral candidate advocated obtaining state or federal funding to revitalize the commercial strip on Main Street which, in theory, could help the city capture some of the wine tourism dollars.

In 2008, the U.S. Fish and Wildlife Service began purchasing land in the Wapato Lake bed to reestablish the historic wetland.

== Geography ==
According to the United States Census Bureau, the city has a total area of 0.28 square miles (0.73 km^{2}), all land.

=== Climate ===
This region experiences warm (but not hot) and dry summers, with no average monthly temperatures above 71.6 °F (22.0 °C). According to the Köppen Climate Classification system, Gaston has a warm-summer Mediterranean climate, abbreviated "Csb" on climate maps.

== Demographics ==
Historical population
Census	Pop.	Note	%±
1920	221		—
1930	227		2.7%
1940	333		46.7%
1950	368		10.5%
1960	320		−13.0%
1970	429		34.1%
1980	471		9.8%
1990	563		19.5%
2000	600		6.6%
2010	637		6.2%
2020	676		6.1%
U.S. Decennial Census

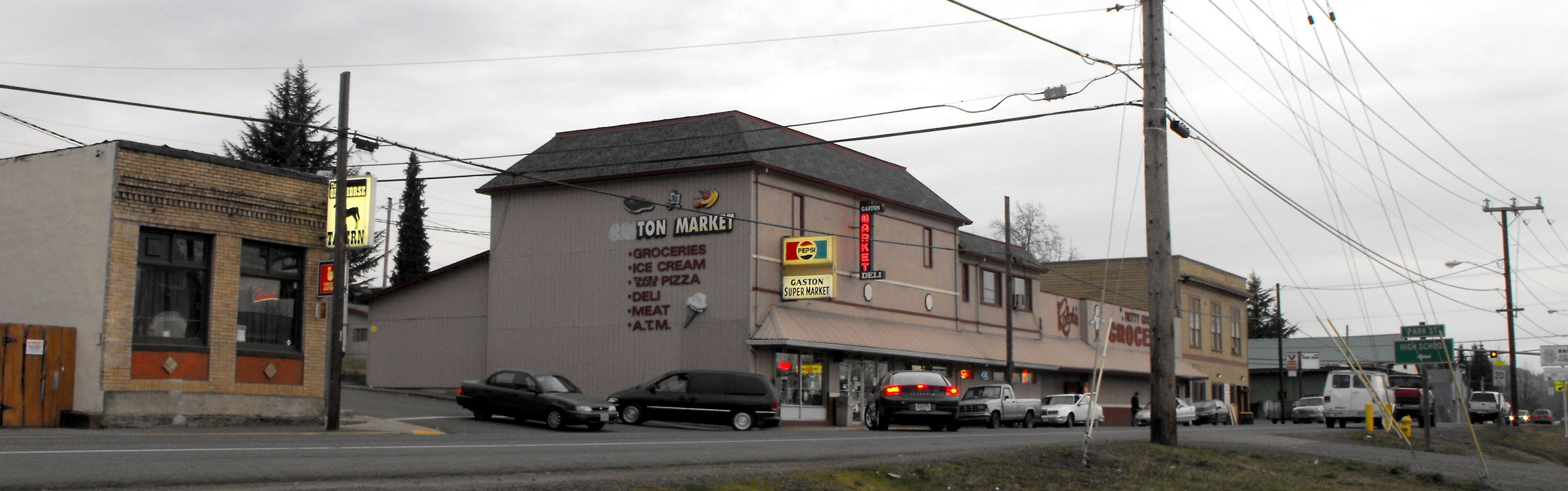
Business district of Gaston on Route 47, looking northwest

=== 2020 census ===
As of the 2020 census, Gaston had a population of 676. The median age was 38.4 years. 25.6% of residents were under the age of 18 and 13.0% of residents were 65 years of age or older. For every 100 females there were 108.0 males, and for every 100 females age 18 and over there were 107.9 males age 18 and over.

0% of residents lived in urban areas, while 100.0% lived in rural areas.

There were 253 households in Gaston, of which 42.7% had children under the age of 18 living in them. Of all households, 54.9% were married-couple households, 18.2% were households with a male householder and no spouse or partner present, and 17.8% were households with a female householder and no spouse or partner present. About 16.2% of all households were made up of individuals and 2.8% had someone living alone who was 65 years of age or older.

There were 253 housing units, of which 0% were vacant. Among occupied housing units, 69.2% were owner-occupied and 30.8% were renter-occupied. The homeowner vacancy rate was <0.1% and the rental vacancy rate was <0.1%.

Racial composition as of the 2020 census
Race	Number	Percent
White	545	80.6%
Black or African American	2	0.3%
American Indian and Alaska Native	2	0.3%
Asian	9	1.3%
Native Hawaiian and Other Pacific Islander	0	0%
Some other race	31	4.6%
Two or more races	87	12.9%
Hispanic or Latino (of any race)	78	11.5%

=== 2010 census ===
As of the census of 2010, there were 637 people, 241 households, and 160 families residing in the city. The population density was 2,275.0 inhabitants per square mile (878.4/km^{2}). There were 251 housing units at an average density of 896.4 per square mile (346.1/km^{2}). The racial makeup of the city was 91.2% White, 0.3% African American, 1.4% Native American, 0.6% Asian, 0.2% Pacific Islander, 3.3% from other races, and 3.0% from two or more races. Hispanic or Latino of any race were 11.0% of the population.

There were 241 households, of which 36.9% had children under the age of 18 living with them, 49.8% were married couples living together, 10.0% had a female householder with no husband present, 6.6% had a male householder with no wife present, and 33.6% were non-families. 25.3% of all households were made up of individuals, and 3.7% had someone living alone who was 65 years of age or older. The average household size was 2.64 and the average family size was 3.18.

The median age in the city was 35.2 years. 26.7% of residents were under the age of 18; 9.5% were between the ages of 18 and 24; 26.7% were from 25 to 44; 31.2% were from 45 to 64; and 6% were 65 years of age or older. The gender makeup of the city was 51.2% male and 48.8% female.

=== 2000 census ===
As of the census of 2000, there were 600 people, 196 households, and 139 families residing in the city. The population density was 2,691.7 inhabitants per square mile (1,039.3/km^{2}). There were 204 housing units at an average density of 915.2 per square mile (353.4/km^{2}). The racial makeup of the city was 88.33% White, 0.83% Native American, 0.17% Asian, 7.00% from other races, and 3.67% from two or more races. Hispanic or Latino of any race were 14.50% of the population.

There were 196 households, out of which 44.9% had children under the age of 18 living with them, 52.0% were married couples living together, 14.8% had a female householder with no husband present, and 28.6% were non-families. 25.0% of all households were made up of individuals, and 3.1% had someone living alone who was 65 years of age or older. The average household size was 3.06 and the average family size was 3.73.

In the city, the population was spread out, with 37.7% under the age of 18, 9.5% from 18 to 24, 30.7% from 25 to 44, 18.2% from 45 to 64, and 4.0% who were 65 years of age or older. The median age was 28 years. For every 100 females, there were 104.1 males. For every 100 females age 18 and over, there were 90.8 males.

The median income for a household in the city was $36,458, and the median income for a family was $42,031. Males had a median income of $31,641 versus $25,833 for females. The per capita income for the city was $17,758. About 9.8% of families and 11.1% of the population were below the poverty line, including 21.3% of those under age 18 and none of those age 65 or over.

== Notable people ==
- Roddy Piper, professional wrestler

== See also ==
- Dundee Lodge
