= Guantanamo Bay detainment camp library =

Library

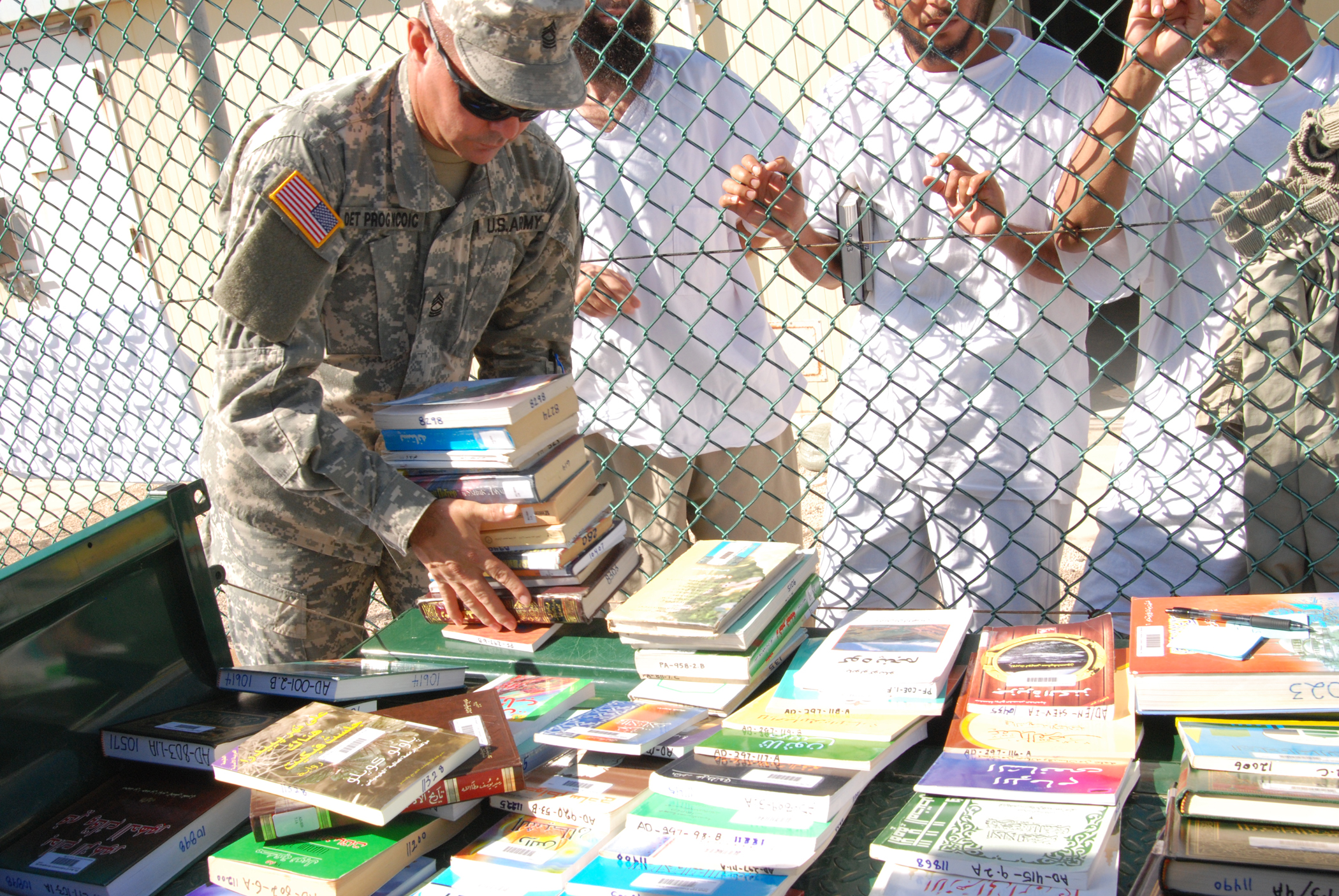
Privileged detainees in Camp 4 wait for books.

The library made available to detainees held in extrajudicial detention in the United States Guantanamo Bay detention camps, in Cuba, is notable for the controversy it has stirred.

Access to books, particularly the Harry Potter series, is widely described as a sign that the conditions for the detainees has improved.

The Department of Defense reports that Guantanamo detainees have access to 3,500 volumes, though they are attempting to increase the collection to 10,000–20,000

Guantanamo detainees such as David Hicks reported that the "reading room" did not contain any reading material itself. They have to "order" books in advance. According to the Library Journal the Associated Press reported that the detainees have been known to use the books to pass messages to each other. Now each book is checked when it was returned. Detainees who break this rule lose their library privileges.

Popular books and authors include the Harry Potter series, Agatha Christie mysteries, Khalil Gibran, self-help manual Don't Be Sad and The Lord of the Rings.

== Letter from "Abdul Aziz" ==
On July 22, 2007 Andy Worthington published an article which quoted extensively from a recently declassified letter from a Guantanamo detainee identified as "Abdul Aziz". The surname of the author of the letter was withheld. He reported that after being offered the same two boxes of tattered books for years he asked the library clerk to stop visiting his cell.

== Content policy ==
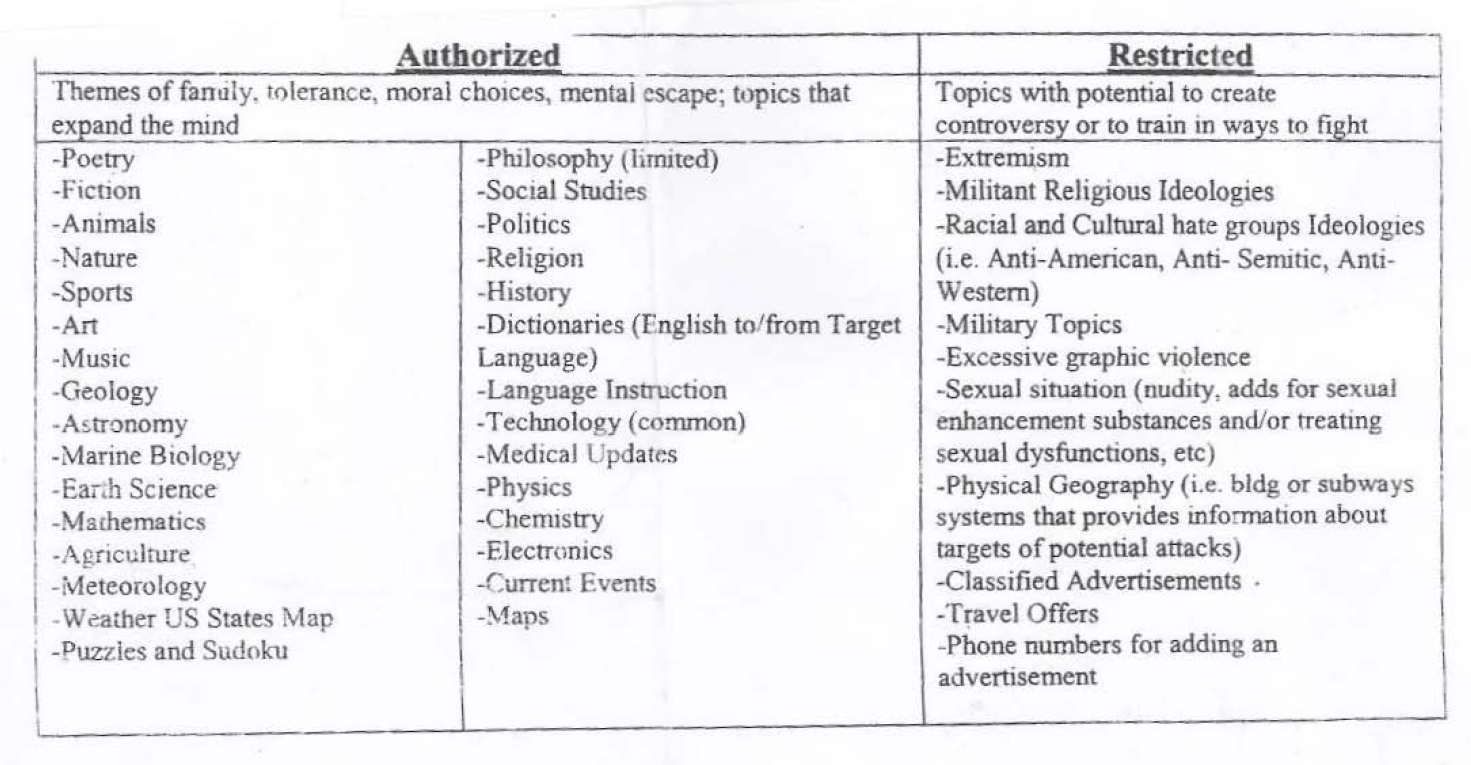
Lists of "authorized" and "restricted" content

On October 11, 2009 the Miami Herald published lists of the kind of content detainees were "authorized" and "restricted" to access.

== Omar Khadr's reading list ==
On October 28, 2010, during Omar Khadr's sentencing hearing, a partial list of the books he had borrowed from the library was a matter of testimony. Prosecution witness Michael Welner, a forensic psychiatrist, characterized Khadr as an unredeemable jihadist who had spent his time at Guantanamo reading the Koran, and was not interested in western literature. During his cross examination Khadr's Defense counsel asked Welner to consult his notes, and read out other books he knew Khadr had borrowed from the library. According to Carol Rosenberg, writing in the Miami Herald, Welner acknowledged Khadr had also borrowed: "Nelson Mandela’s [Long] Walk to Freedom, Barack Obama’s Dreams of My Father, Ishmael Beah’s A Long Way Gone: Memoirs of a Boy Soldier, Stephenie Meyer’s Twilight series plus unnamed thrillers by John Grisham and steamy novels by Danielle Steel."

== See also ==
- Mail privileges of Guantanamo Bay detainees
- Telephone access of Guantanamo Bay detainees
