= Tugwell =

Tugwell is a surname, and may refer to:

- A. P. Tugwell
- Chris Tugwell, Australian playwright
- Christopher Tugwell, South African artist
- Finn Tugwell
- Rexford Tugwell
