= My Journey =

My Journey may refer to:

== Books ==
- My Journey, autobiography of Irish Australian rules footballer Jim Stynes, 2012
- Guantanamo: My Journey, autobiography of Australian internee David Hicks

== Film and TV ==
- "My Journey" (Scrubs), episode of Scrubs

== Albums ==
- My Journey (Karise Eden album), a 2012 album
- My Journey (Shila Amzah album), a 2016 album
- My Journey 1999 album by Swedish singer Pernilla Andersson
- My Journey, Gospel album by Gina Green 2008

== See also ==
- "On My Journey Now" a song by Paul Robeson
