= Stephen Kenny =

Stephen Kenny may refer to:

- Stephen Kenny (lawyer), Guantanamo detainee David Hicks' original lawyer
- Stephen Kenny (football manager) (born 1971), Irish football manager

== See also ==
- Steve Kenney (born 1955), American football player
