= J. D. Gordon =

American political consultant and US Navy officer

J.D. Gordon
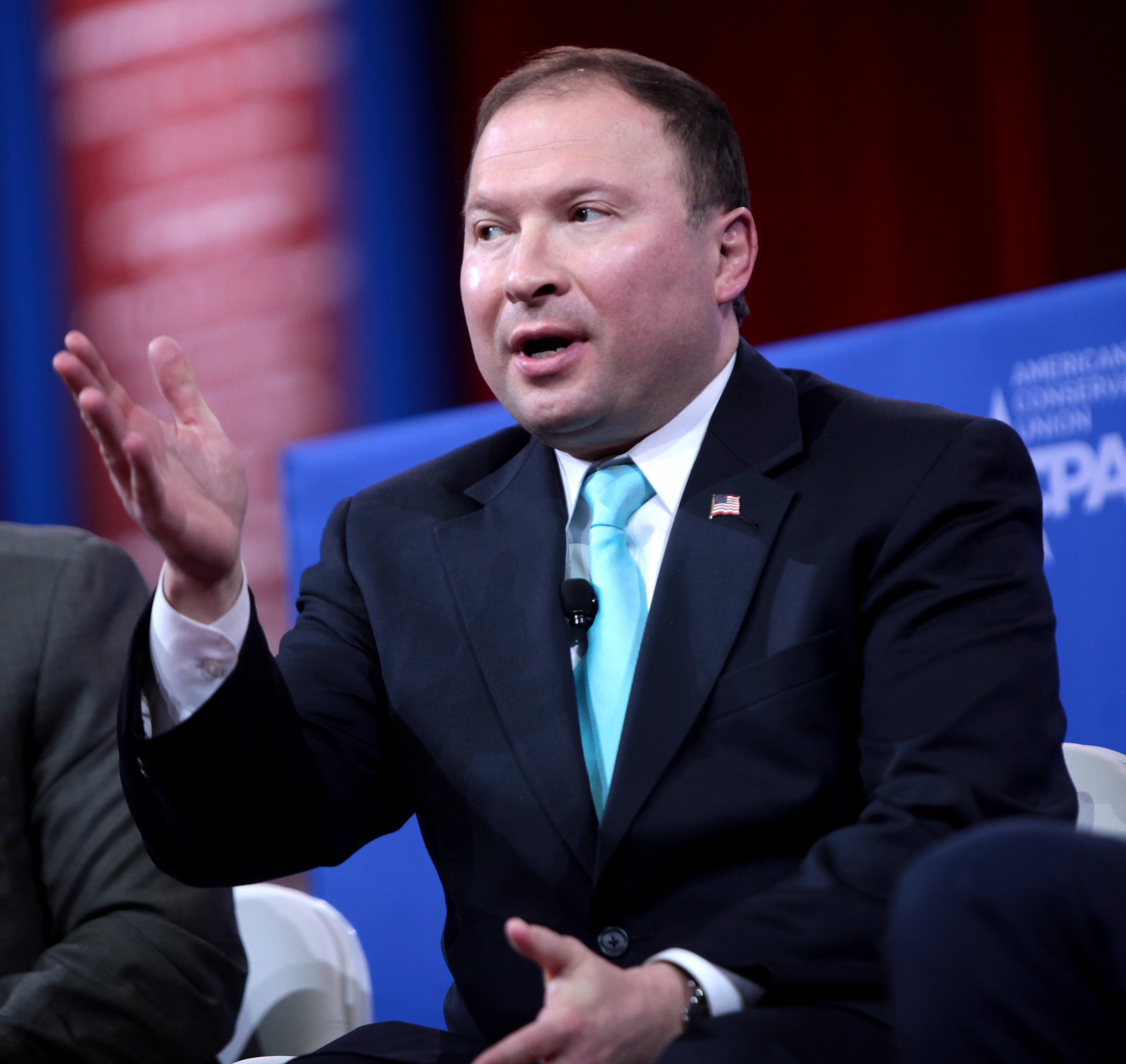
- Born: New York City, New York, U.S.
- Education: Pennsylvania State University, University Park (BA); Norwich University (MA)
- Known for: Pentagon spokesman, national security advisor

Jeffrey D. "J.D." Gordon is an American communications and foreign policy adviser, who served as a Pentagon spokesman during the George W. Bush administration and later a national security adviser to Donald Trump. Gordon is a retired United States Navy officer who was a senior adviser to numerous prominent Republican political figures. Gordon has also been a television commentator and columnist with various media outlets including One America News Network, Fox News, Sky News, The Daily Caller, USA Today, The Hill, The Washington Times and others. Gordon founded Protect America Today, a national security–themed Super PAC in February 2012.

Gordon served a 20-year military career, first in amphibious warfare, and then as a spokesman for the Navy and Department of Defense. He managed communications and press relations in a wide variety of locations including posts in Europe, Latin America and Asia. His final assignment was at the Pentagon, serving under Secretaries Donald Rumsfeld and Robert Gates from 2005 to 2009. In March 2016, he joined the Trump campaign as the Director of National Security, managing the National Security Advisory Committee under its chairman, Senator Jeff Sessions (R.-Ala.) who became the Attorney General following Trump's election victory. State Department documents show Gordon was formally recommended for the position of Under Secretary, Public Diplomacy and Public Affairs.

== Early life and education ==
Gordon was born in New York City, raised at the Jersey Shore and graduated from Wall High School, located in Wall Township, New Jersey. Gordon received his undergraduate and graduate education from Penn State University and Norwich University. He completed two senior executive certificate programs at Harvard University Law School's Program on Negotiation.

== Naval career ==
After graduating college, Gordon entered the Navy, where he was commissioned as an officer through the Navy ROTC program. He was initially assigned to the Naval Amphibious Base Little Creek in Virginia. He had additional professional training at the Air Command and Staff College.

Beginning in the early 1990s, Gordon served as a Navy spokesman in various assignments and geographical locations, to include the Pacific Fleet Headquarters in Pearl Harbor, Hawaii; Naval Forces Southern Command in Roosevelt Roads, Puerto Rico; Naval Support Activity, Naples, Italy; Amphibious Force Seventh Fleet based in Okinawa, Japan; and Atlantic Fleet headquarters in Norfolk, Virginia.

In 1994, Gordon served at Guantanamo Bay Naval Base as the spokesman for the Haitian and Cuban refugee crises. Later that year, he deployed to Haiti with the Multi-National Force for the restoration of President Jean Bertrand Aristide to power.

While based in Puerto Rico from 1999 to 2001, Gordon served as a spokesman for the Atlantic Fleet during controversy associated with its training range on Vieques Island. It had been occupied by protesters who were trying to force the Navy to leave. The Navy had used the range for major fleet exercises for decades. Gordon also served in Navy Office of Information (CHINFO) as the director of public affairs plans.

=== Pentagon spokesman ===
In 2005, Gordon transferred to the Office of the Secretary of Defense, where he served as a Pentagon spokesman, first under Secretary Donald Rumsfeld and later Secretary Robert Gates. In this period, notable issues were related to the wars in Iraq and Afghanistan, as well as the extrajudicial detention of captives in the Guantanamo Bay detention camps in Cuba. Other issues were increasing U.S. tensions with Venezuela under Hugo Chavez, and increasing cooperation between the U.S. and Mexico against drug cartels. Gordon contributed to developing Defense Department policies related to the use of social networking services and sites such as YouTube by military personnel, which DoD prohibits.

On October 2, 2007, Gordon explained why the Defense Department continued to hold certain detainees at Guantanamo, although they had been cleared for release. He touched on the need to ensure that receiving countries treated them properly, saying "All detainees at Guantanamo are considered a threat to the United States — to include those transferred yesterday. As a condition of repatriation, nations accepting detainees must take steps to prevent the return to terrorism, as well as providing credible assurances of humane treatment."

Gordon retired from the Navy as a Commander.

=== Complaint with the Miami Herald ===
In his position as Pentagon spokesman, on July 25, 2009, Gordon wrote to a senior editor at the Miami Herald, reporting what he characterized as sexual harassment by its reporter Carol Rosenberg, whose beat was the Guantanamo detention camp. He said that Rosenberg had made crude jokes at his expense. The Miami Herald conducted an internal investigation, and reported on August 3, 2009, that it had concluded that, while Rosenberg had used profanity, she had not carried out sexual harassment.

Gordon returned to the issue a year later in a column written for Fox News on August 9, 2010. In discussing the Pentagon having banned four reporters from Guantanamo, including Rosenberg, he said that Rosenberg was "notorious for clashes" and claimed she used language to him "... that would make even Helen Thomas blush", referring to a prominent reporter at the White House.

== Political career ==
Since leaving the Pentagon, Gordon has worked as a senior advisor to national Republican political figures, including former Alaska Governor Sarah Palin, Donald Trump, Herman Cain, and former Arkansas Governor Mike Huckabee, the latter three during their respective presidential campaigns.

=== 2010 and 2012 election cycles ===
In 2011, Gordon became Vice President of Communications and Chief Foreign Policy and Security Advisor for the 2012 Republican presidential candidate Herman Cain. Grace Wiler of Business Insider described Gordon's dual role as both campaign spokesman and foreign policy advisor as evidence that Cain had "completely thrown out the conventional campaign playbook." From its analysis of Gordon's columns and television appearances prior to the campaign, The Nation magazine wrote, "it would appear that Cain is getting the same national security advice he would from Dick Cheney."

After the Cain campaign ended, Gordon returned to his role as an advisor to Washington-based think tanks, as well as conservative columnist and television commentator.

=== Protect America Today PAC ===
In February 2012, Gordon founded a national security-themed Super PAC, Protect America Today (PAT). During the 2012 presidential campaign, Gordon ran political ads in eight states for 16 federal candidates to "Save 1 million jobs," a reference to stopping further cuts to defense spending, including sequestration. Winning candidates backed by Gordon included Senator Dean Heller (R-NV), House Speaker John Boehner (R-OH), Representative Ileana Ros-Lehtinen (R-FL), Representative Mario Díaz-Balart (R-FL), and Representative Steve Daines (R-MT).

During the 2014 mid-term elections, 13 of 16 candidates for whom Gordon ran ads won their races, as Republicans took control of both the Senate and House of Representatives. PAT-endorsed candidates who won their elections include Senate Majority Leader, Senator Mitch McConnell (R-KY), Senator Thom Tillis (R-NC), Senator Joni Ernst (R-IA), Senator Tom Cotton (R-AR), Senator Cory Gardner (R-CO) Senator Bill Cassidy (R-LA), Representative Barbara Comstock (R-VA), Representative Renee Ellmers (R-NC), Representative Steve King (R-IA), Representative French Hill (R-AR), Representative Mike Coffman (R-CO) and Representative Steve Scalise (R-LA).

In 2016, Protect America Today backed successful Senate and House candidates including Senator Pat Toomey, Rep. Brian Fitzpatrick in Pennsylvania; Sen. Rob Portman, Rep. Jim Jordan in Ohio; Sen. Todd Young in Indiana; Sen. Ron Johnson, Rep. Jim Sensenbrenner in Wisconsin; Sen. Johnny Isakson, Rep. Lynn Westmoreland in Georgia and Rep. Darrell Issa in California.

=== 2016 US presidential campaign ===
During the 2016 presidential election cycle, Gordon initially supported former Arkansas Governor Mike Huckabee. In 2015, Gordon became Huckabee's Chief Foreign Policy Advisor. He appeared on behalf of Huckabee at various events, to include speaking at a White House rally against the Iran Deal in July 2015, alongside Sen. Ted Cruz (R-TX).

In February 2016, Gordon endorsed Donald Trump for president.

In March 2016, he joined the Trump campaign as the Director of National Security, managing the National Security Advisory Committee under its chairman, Senator Jeff Sessions.

== RNC platform role ==
In July 2016, just prior to the Republicans' 2016 Convention in Cleveland, Gordon successfully advocated with elected delegates to soften a proposed amendment to the Republican National Committee's policy platform that called for providing "lethal defensive weapons" to the government of Ukraine. At the time, many Republican foreign policy leaders favored stronger support of Ukraine than the Obama administration had offered. In January 2017, Business Insider reported that he had "never left" his "assigned side table, nor spoke publicly at the meeting of delegates during the platform meeting," but in March 2017 he acknowledged to CNN that, in CNN's words, "Gordon had advocated for language in the GOP platform that the Ukrainians not be armed in their battle against pro-Russian separatists." Gordon has said of his advice to soften the proposed amendment on Ukraine that "this was the language Donald Trump himself wanted," though he has denied that Trump was aware at the time of the "details."

After the election, media outlets reported that Gordon had encountered Russian Ambassador to the US Sergey Kislyak on July 20, 2016, a week after the platform amendment debate, while serving as a guest speaker to over 50 ambassadors to the United States as part of the U.S. State Department's Global Partners in Diplomacy Program (GPD). Previously, Trump campaign spokeswoman Hope Hicks had denied any contacts with Russian diplomats. In August 2018, The Washington Post reported that Gordon had socialized with Maria Butina, a Russian graduate student at American University, in the weeks before the 2016 presidential election.

== See also ==
- Links between Trump associates and Russian officials
- Mueller report
- Russian interference in the 2016 United States elections
