= David Hicks =

Australian who trained with Al-Qaeda and was later detained at Guantanamo Bay

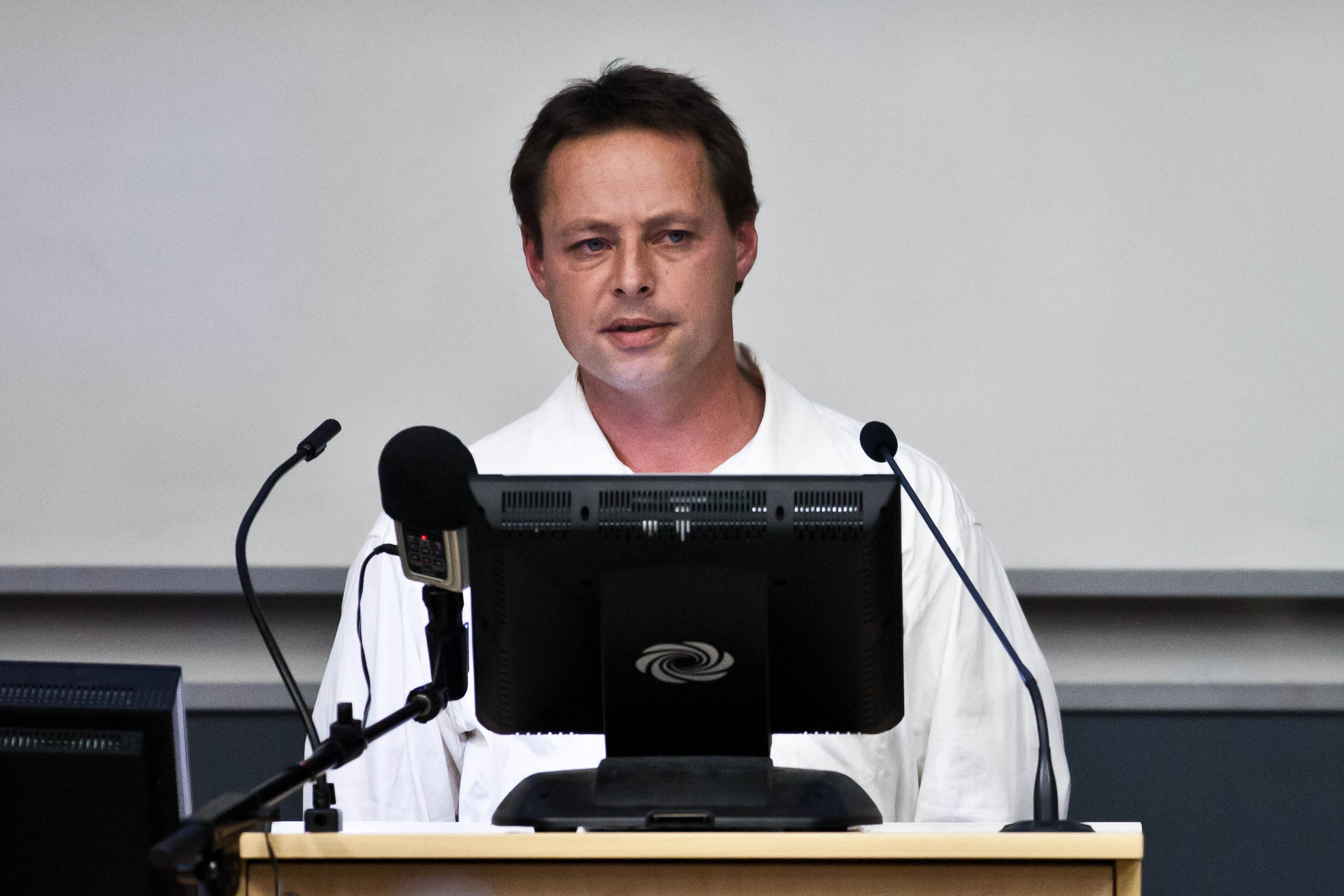
- Hicks speaking in 2012
- Born: David Matthew Hicks; 7 August 1975 (age 51); Adelaide, South Australia
- Other name: Muhammed Dawood
- Citizenship: Australia; British (2005; revoked the same day)
- Spouse: Erin Keniry
- Parents: Terry; Susan
- Military career
- Allegiance: Kosovo Liberation Army (1999); Lashkar-e-Taiba (2000–2001)
- Service years: 1999–2001
- Conflicts: Yugoslav Wars; Kosovo War; Kashmir conflict; War in Afghanistan

David Matthew Hicks (born 7 August 1975) is an Australian who attended al-Qaeda's Al Farouq training camp in Afghanistan. Hicks traveled to Pakistan after converting to Islam to learn more about the faith, eventually leading to his time in the training camp. He states that he was unfamiliar with al-Qaeda and had no idea that they targeted civilians. Hicks met with Osama bin Laden in 2001.

Later that year, he was captured and brought to the U.S. to be tried. He was then detained by the United States in Guantanamo Bay detention camp, where he reported undergoing torture at the hands of American soldiers, from 2002 until 2007. He was eventually convicted under the Military Commissions Act of 2006.

In 2012, his conviction was overturned because the law under which he was charged had not been passed at the time the actions he was arrested for were committed.

== Early life ==
David Hicks was born in Adelaide, South Australia, to Terry and Susan Hicks. His parents separated when he was ten years old, and his father later remarried. He has a half sister.

Described by his father as "a typical boy who couldn't settle down" and by his former school principal as one of "the most troublesome kids", Hicks reportedly experimented with alcohol and drugs as a teenager and was expelled from Smithfield Plains High School in 1990 at age 14. Before turning 15, Hicks was given dispensation by his father from attending school. His former partner has claimed that Hicks turned to criminal activity, including vehicle theft, allegedly in order to feed himself, although no adult criminal record was ever recorded for this.

Hicks moved between various jobs, including factory work and working at a series of outback cattle stations in the Northern Territory, Queensland and South Australia.

== Marriage and family ==
Hicks met Jodie Sparrow in Adelaide when he was 17 years old. Sparrow already had a daughter, whom Hicks raised as his own. Hicks and Sparrow had two children together, daughter Bonnie and son Terry, before separating in 1996. After their separation, Hicks moved to Japan to become a horse trainer.

He married Aloysia Brooks in 2009. Hicks appeared in court in April 2017 for allegedly assaulting a subsequent partner in Craigmore, South Australia but the case was dropped with legal costs awarded against the South Australia Police.

== Guantanamo Bay ==
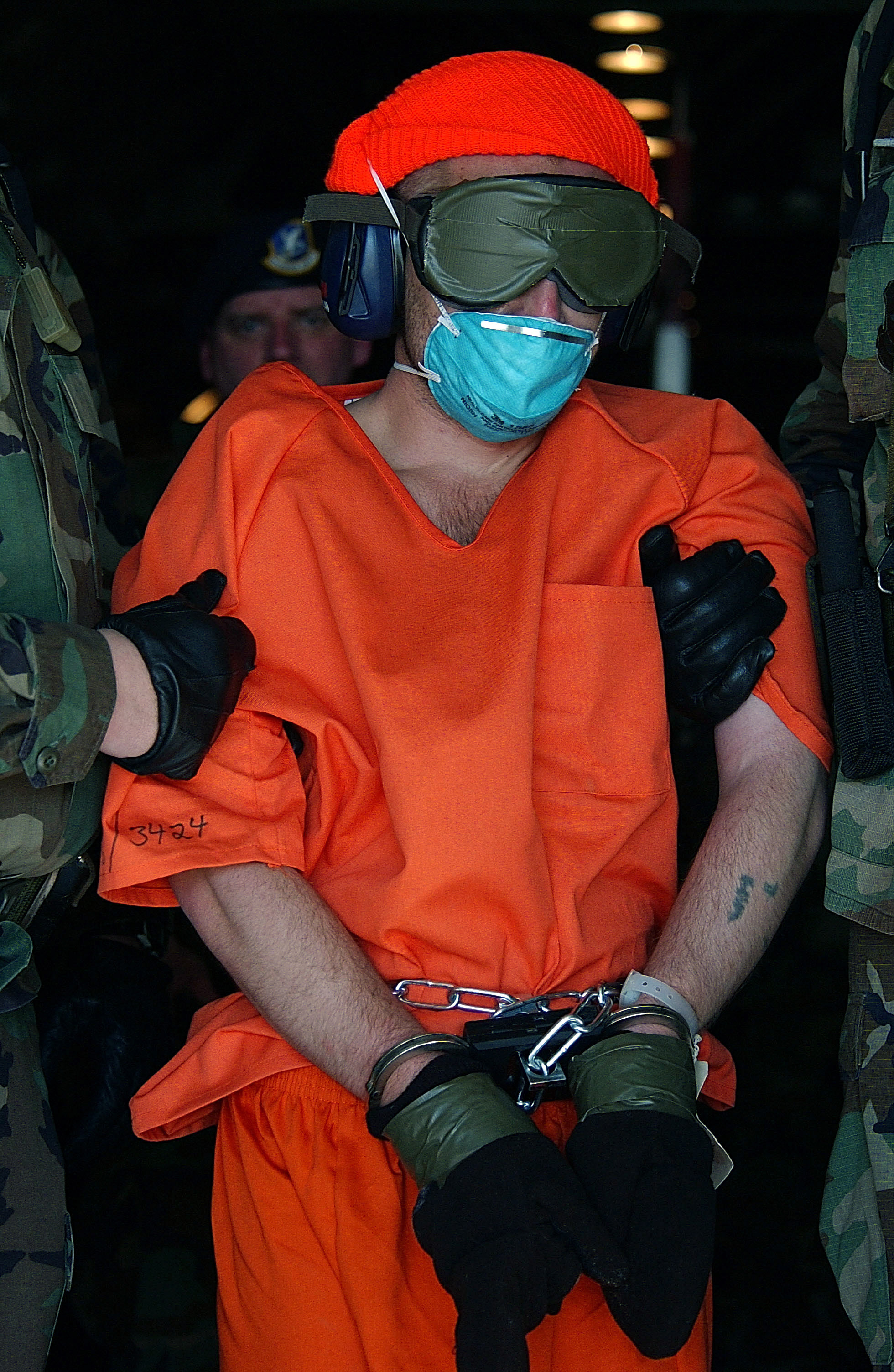
Hicks being brought to Guantanamo Bay

In 1999, Hicks converted to Islam and took the name Muhammed Dawood (محمد داود). He was later reported to have been publicly denounced due to his lack of religious observance. Hicks was captured in Afghanistan in December 2001 by the Afghan Northern Alliance and sold for a US$5,000 bounty to the United States military. He was transported to Guantanamo Bay where he was designated an enemy combatant. He alleged that during his detention, he was tortured via anal examination. The United States first filed charges against Hicks in 2004 under a military commission system newly created by Presidential Order. Those proceedings failed in 2006 when the Supreme Court of the United States ruled, in Hamdan v. Rumsfeld, that the military commission system was unconstitutional. The military commission system was re-established by an act of the United States Congress.

In 2007, Hicks consented to a plea bargain in which he pleaded guilty to charges of providing material support for terrorism by the United States Guantanamo military commission under the Military Commissions Act of 2006. Hicks received a suspended sentence and returned to Australia. The conviction was overturned by the US Court of Military Commission Review in February 2015. Revised charges were filed against Hicks in February 2007 before a new commission under the new act. The following month, in accordance with a pre-trial agreement struck with convening authority Judge Susan J. Crawford, Hicks entered an Alford plea to a single newly codified charge of providing material support for terrorism. Hicks's legal team attributed his acceptance of the plea bargain to his "desperation for release from Guantanamo" and duress under "instances of severe beatings, sleep deprivation and other conditions of detention that contravene international human rights norms."

Hicks became one of the first people charged and subsequently convicted under the Military Commissions Act. There was widespread Australian and international criticism and political controversy over Hicks's treatment, the evidence tendered against him, his trial outcome, and the newly created legal system under which he was prosecuted. In October 2012, the United States Court of Appeals ruled that the charge under which Hicks had been convicted was invalid because the law did not exist at the time of the alleged offence, and it could not be applied retroactively.

In January 2015, Hicks's lawyer announced that the US government had said that Hicks's conviction was not correct and that it does not dispute his innocence.

== Return to Australia ==
In April 2007, Hicks was returned to Australia to serve the remaining nine months of a suspended seven-year sentence. During this period, he was precluded from all media contact. There was criticism that the government delayed his release until after the 2007 Australian election. Colonel Morris Davis, the former Pentagon chief prosecutor, later confessed political interference in the case by the Bush administration in the United States and the Howard government in Australia. He said that Hicks should not have been prosecuted.

Hicks served his term in Adelaide's Yatala Labour Prison and was released under a control order on 29 December 2007. The control order expired in December 2008. Hicks still lives in Adelaide and has written an autobiography.

== Religious and militant activities ==
Hicks converted to Islam, and began studying Wahhabism at a mosque in Gilles Plains, a suburb north of Adelaide. The president of the Islamic Society of South Australia, Wali Hanifi, described Hicks as having "some interest in military things", and that "after personal experience and research, [found] that Islam was the answer".

In 2007, Hicks explained his motivation to convert to Islam:

Eight years ago I converted to Islam. I was completely transformed by its pure expression of monotheism, its compassion, its sense of community, and its role as the religion of the oppressed and the wretched of the earth.

=== Kosovo Liberation Army ===
Around May 1999, Hicks travelled to Albania in order to join the Kosovo Liberation Army. The US military alleged that he undertook basic training and hostile action before returning to Australia and converting to Islam. The KLA did not accept Islamic fundamentalism, and many of its fighters and fundraisers were Catholic. In June 1999, the Kosovo War ended and the KLA disbanded as part of UNSCR 1244. Hicks described his time with the KLA as a life-changing experience and on his return to Australia, converted to Islam and began studying at a mosque in Gilles Plains in Adelaide.

=== Lashkar-e-Taiba ===
On 11 November 1999, Hicks travelled to Pakistan to study Islam and allegedly began training with Lashkar-e-Taiba (L-e-T) in early 2000. In the US Military Commission charges presented in 2004, Hicks is accused of training at the Mosqua Aqsa camp in Pakistan, after which he "travelled to a border region between Pakistan-controlled Kashmir and Indian-controlled Kashmir, where he engaged in hostile action against Indian forces.".

In a March 2000 letter to his family, Hicks wrote:

don't ask what's happened, I can't be bothered explaining the outcome of these strange events has put me in Pakistan-Kashmir in a training camp. Three months training. After which it is my decision whether to cross the line of control into Indian occupied Kashmir.

In another letter on 10 August 2000, Hicks wrote from Kashmir claiming to have been a guest of Pakistan's army for two weeks at the front in the "controlled war" with India:

I got to fire hundreds of bullets. Most Muslim countries impose hanging for civilians arming themselves for conflict. There are not many countries in the world where a tourist, according to his visa, can go to stay with the army and shoot across the border at its enemy, legally.

During this period, Hicks kept a notebook to document his training in weapon use, explosives, and military tactics, in which he wrote that guerrilla warfare involved "sacrifice for Allah". He took extensive notes on, and made sketches of, various weaponry mechanisms and attack strategies (including Heckler & Koch submachine guns, the M16 assault rifle, RPG-7 grenade launcher, anti-tank rockets, and VIP security infiltration). Letters to his family detailed his training:

I learnt about weapons such as ballistic missiles, surface to surface and shoulder fired missiles, anti aircraft and anti-tank rockets, rapid fire heavy and light machine guns, pistols, AK-47s, mines and explosives. After three months everybody leaves capable and war-ready being able to use all of these weapons capably and responsibly. I am now very well trained for jihad in weapons some serious like anti-aircraft missiles.

In January 2001, Hicks was provided with funding and an introductory letter from Lashkar-e-Taiba. He travelled to Afghanistan to attend training. According to Hicks's autobiography Guantanamo: My Journey, he was unfamiliar with the name Al-Qaeda until after his detainment in Guantanamo Bay.

=== Afghanistan ===
Upon arrival in Afghanistan, Hicks allegedly went to an al-Qaeda guest house where he met Ibn al-Shaykh al-Libi, a high-ranking al Qaeda member. He turned over his passport and told them that he would use the alias "Muhammad Dawood" (to protect himself from attack). Hicks allegedly "attended a number of al-Qaeda training courses at various camps around Afghanistan, learning guerrilla warfare, weapons training, including landmines, kidnapping techniques and assassination methods." He also allegedly participated "in an advanced course on surveillance, in which he conducted surveillance of the abandoned buildings that had formerly been the US and British embassies in Kabul, Afghanistan." Hicks was sent to learn guerrilla techniques for the Pakistani L-e-T for use in disputed Kashmir.

Hicks denies any involvement with al-Qaeda. He also denies any knowledge of links between the camp and al-Qaeda. According to Hicks, he did not know of the existence of al-Qaeda until he was taken to Cuba and was interrogated by US military personnel.

There were three or four camps under the name of Camp Farouk at that time in Afghanistan. I attended the open mainstream camp, not terrorist camps. I would not have been there if there was any suggestion of terrorist activity or the targeting of civilians. How would a white boy new to Islam, not understanding local customs or languages, largely uneducated in the ways of the world, get access to such supposedly secret camps planning acts of terror? The camps I attended were not al-Qaeda. I did not hear about such an organisation until my arrival in Guantanamo Bay.

— David Hicks

On one occasion when al-Qaeda founder Osama bin Laden visited an Afghan camp, the US Defense Department alleges Hicks questioned bin Laden about the lack of English in training material and subsequently "began to translate the training camp materials from Arabic to English". Hicks denies this and denies having had the necessary language proficiency, a claim supported by Major Michael Mori and fellow detainee Moazzam Begg. The latter said that Hicks could not speak enough Arabic to be understood. Hicks wrote home that he had met Osama bin Laden 20 times. He later, however, told investigators he had exaggerated, that he had seen bin Laden about eight times and spoken to him only once.

There are a lot of Muslims who want to meet Osama Bin Laden but after being a Muslim for 16 months I get to meet him.

Prosecutors also allege Hicks was interviewed by Mohammed Atef, an al-Qaeda military commander, about his background and "the travel habits of Australians". In a memoir that was later repudiated by its author, the Guantanamo detainee Feroz Abbasi claimed Hicks was "Al-Qaedah's 24 [carat] Golden Boy" and "obviously the favourite recruit" of their al-Qaeda trainers during exercises at the al-Farouq camp near Kandahar. The memoir made a number of claims, including that Hicks was teamed in the training camp with Filipino recruits from the Moro Islamic Liberation Front and that, during internment in Camp X-Ray, Hicks allegedly described his desire to "go back to Australia and rob and kill Jews ... crash a plane into a building" and to "go out with that last big adrenaline rush."

==== September 2001 ====
On 9 September 2001, Hicks travelled from Afghanistan to Pakistan to visit a friend. A US Department of Defense statement claimed that "viewing TV news coverage in Pakistan of the 11 September 2001 attacks against the United States" led Hicks to return to Afghanistan to "rejoin his al-Qaeda associates to fight against U.S., British, Canadian, Australian, Afghan, and other coalition forces." Hicks denies this claim in his book. Although the L-e-T offered to provide documentation to allow him to return to Australia, Hicks feared arrest for using false documents. Hicks returned in order to get his passport and birth certificate back so he could travel home to Adelaide.

Hicks arrived in the southern Afghan city of Kandahar where he reported to Saif al Adel, who was assigning individuals to locations, and "armed himself with an AK-47 automatic rifle, ammunition, and grenades to fight against coalition forces." Hicks was given a choice of three locations and chose to join an alleged group of al-Qaeda fighters defending the Kandahar airport. After Coalition bombing commenced in October 2001, Hicks began guarding a Taliban tank position outside the airport. After guarding the tank for a week, Hicks, with an L-e-T acquaintance, travelled closer to the battle front in Kunduz where he joined others, including John Walker Lindh.

Colonel Morris Davis, chief prosecutor for the US office of Military Commissions, said, "He eventually left Afghanistan and it's my understanding was heading back to Australia when 9/11 happened. When he heard about 9/11, he said it was a good thing (and) he went back to the battlefield, back to Afghanistan, and reported in to the senior leadership of al-Qaeda and basically said, 'I'm David Hicks and I'm reporting for duty.'" Davis also compared Hicks's alleged actions to that of those who carried out terrorist attacks such as the Bali, London and Madrid bombings, and the Beslan school siege. Terry Hicks, said that his son seemed at first unaware, then sceptical, of the 11 September attacks when they spoke on a mobile phone in early November 2001. He also noted David Hicks commented about "going off to Kabul to defend it against the Northern Alliance."

In October and November 2001, Hicks wrote multiple letters to his mother in Australia. He asked that replies were to be directed to Abu Muslim Austraili, a pseudonym he used to circumvent non-Muslim spies he believed intercepted correspondence. In these letters he detailed the validity of jihad and his own prospect of martyrdom.

As a Muslim young and fit my responsibility is to protect my brothers from aggressive non-believers and not let them destroy it. Islam will rule again but for now we must have patience we are asked to sacrifice our lives for Allahs cause why not? There are many privileges in heaven. It is not just war, it is jihad. One reward I get in being martyred I get to take ten members of my family to heaven who were destined for hell, but first I also must be martyred. We are all going to die one day so why not be martyred?

David Hicks wrote a number of antisemitic letters during his time in Afghanistan which were published in The Australian with statements such as "The Jews have complete financial and media control many of them are in the Australian government" and "The western society is controlled by the Jews".

In November 2005, the Australian Broadcasting Corporation's Four Corners TV program broadcast for the first time a transcript of an interview with Hicks, conducted by the Australian Federal Police (AFP) in 2002, and other material, including a report that Hicks had signed a statement written by American military investigators stating that he had trained with al-Qaeda in Afghanistan, learning guerrilla tactics and urban warfare. The program also reported that Hicks had met Osama bin Laden and that he claimed to have disapproved of the 11 September attacks but to have been unable to leave Afghanistan. He denied engaging in any actual fighting against US or allied forces and states in his autobiography that he was made to sign the statement under extreme duress.

== Capture and detention ==
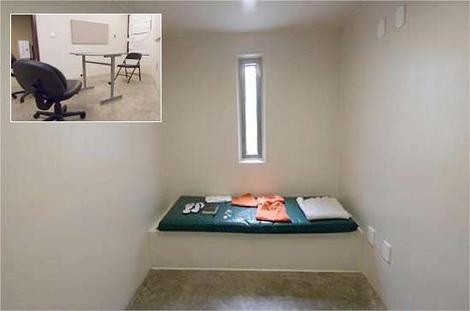
David Hicks's Guantanamo Bay cell (November 2006) and, inset, a reading room

Hicks was captured by a "Northern Alliance warlord" near Kunduz, Afghanistan, on or about 9 December 2001 and turned over to US Special Forces for US$5000 on 17 December 2001. Hicks's father Terry, when interviewed, said "David was captured by the Northern Alliance unarmed in the back of a truck or a van. So he wasn't on the battlefield at all."

In 2002, Hicks's father sought to have him brought to Australia for trial. In 2003, the Australian government requested that Hicks be brought to trial without further delay, extending Hicks consular support and legal aid under the Special Circumstances Overseas Scheme.

== Torture allegations ==
In an affidavit, dated 5 August 2004 and released on 10 December 2004, Hicks alleged mistreatment by US forces, included being:

- beaten while blindfolded and handcuffed
- forced to take unidentified medication
- sedated by injection without consent
- struck while under sedation
- regularly forced to run in leg shackles causing ankle injury
- deprived of sleep "as a matter of policy"
- sexually assaulted
- witness to use of attack dogs to brutalise and injure detainees.

He also said he met with US military investigators conducting a probe into detainee abuse in Afghanistan and had told the International Red Cross on earlier occasions that he had been mistreated. Hicks told his family in a 2004 visit to Guantanamo Bay that he had been anally assaulted during interrogation by the US in Afghanistan while he was hooded and restrained. Hicks's father claimed; "He said he was anally penetrated a number of times, they put a bag over his head, he wasn't expecting it and didn't know what it was. It was quite brutal." In a Four Corners interview, Terry Hicks discussed these "allegations of physical and sexual abuse of his son by American soldiers".

According to conversations with his father, Hicks said he had been abused by both Northern Alliance and US soldiers. In response, the Australian government announced its acceptance of US assurances that David Hicks had been treated in accordance with international law.

In March 2006, camp authorities moved all ten of the Guantanamo detainees who faced charges into solitary confinement. This was described as a routine measure because of the impending attendance of the detainees at their respective tribunals. Hicks remained in solitary confinement, which was reported to have "deteriorated his condition," for seven weeks after the US Supreme Court confirmed a ruling that the military commissions were unconstitutional.

Hicks was a "well-behaved detainee", but was in solitary confinement for 23 hours a day. The window in his cell was internal, facing onto a corridor. Hicks claimed to have declined a visit from Australian Consular officials because he had been punished for speaking candidly with consular officials about the conditions of his detention on previous visits. Hicks was talking about suicidal impulses during his periods in isolation at Camp Echo. "He often talked about wanting to smash his head ... against the metal of his cage and just end it all", Mozzam Begg said.

== Indictment ==
=== Initial charges ===
David Hicks, charge sheet, Guantanamo military commission

Hicks was charged by a US military commission on 26 August 2004.

In Guantanamo, Hicks had signed a statement written by American military investigators which read, in part, "I believe that al-Qaeda camps provided a great opportunity for Muslims like myself from all over the world to train for military operations and Jihad. I knew after six months that I was receiving training from al-Qaeda, who had declared war on numerous countries and peoples." The indictment later prepared by US military prosecutors for his commission trial alleged that, prior to his capture in 2001, Hicks had trained and conspired in various ways and was guilty of "aiding the enemy" while an "unprivileged belligerent" but did not allege any specific acts of violence. The indictment made the following allegations:

- In November 1999, Hicks travelled to Pakistan, where he joined the paramilitary Islamist group, Lashkar-e-Toiba (Army of the Pure).
- Hicks trained for two months at a Lashkar-e-Toiba camp in Pakistan, where he received weapons training and that, during 2000, he served with a Lashkar-e-Toiba group near the Pakistan administered Kashmir.
- In January 2001, Hicks travelled to Afghanistan, then under the control of the Taliban regime, where he presented a letter of introduction from Lashkar-e-Toiba to Ibn al-Shaykh al-Libi, a senior al-Qaeda member, and was given the alias "Mohammed Dawood".
- Hicks was sent to al-Qaeda's al-Farouq training camp outside Kandahar, where he trained for eight weeks, receiving further weapons training as well as training with land mines and explosives.
- Hicks did a further seven-week course at al-Farouq, during which he studied marksmanship, ambush, camouflage and intelligence techniques.
- At Osama bin Laden's request, Hicks translated some al-Qaeda training materials from Arabic into English.
- In June 2001, on the instructions of Mohammed Atef, an al-Qaeda military commander, Hicks went to another training camp at Tarnak Farm, where he studied "urban tactics", including the use of assault and sniper rifles, rappelling, kidnapping and assassination techniques.
- In August 2001, Hicks went to Kabul, where he studied information collection and intelligence, as well as Islamic theology including the doctrines of jihad and martyrdom as understood through al-Qaeda's fundamentalist interpretation of Islam.
- In September 2001, Hicks travelled to Pakistan and was there at the time of the 11 September attacks on the United States, which he saw on television.
- Hicks returned to Afghanistan in anticipation of the attack by the United States and its allies on the Taliban regime, which was sheltering Osama bin Laden.
- On returning to Kabul, Hicks was assigned by Mohammed Atef to the defence of Kandahar and that he joined a group of mixed al-Qaeda and Taliban fighters at Kandahar airport. At the end of October, however, Hicks and his party travelled north to join in the fighting against the forces of the US and its allies.
- After arriving in Konduz on 9 November 2001, he joined a group which included John Walker Lindh (the "American Taliban"). This group was engaged in combat against Coalition forces and, during the fighting, he was captured by Coalition forces.

On 29 June 2006, the US Supreme Court ruled in Hamdan v. Rumsfeld that the military commissions were illegal under United States law and the Geneva Conventions. The commission trying Hicks was abolished and the charges against him voided.

In an interview with The Age newspaper in January 2007, Col. Morris Davis, the chief prosecutor in the Guantanamo military commissions, also alleged that Hicks had been issued with weapons to fight US troops, and had conducted surveillance against US and international embassies. Davis stated he would be charged for these offences, and predicted the charging would take place before the end of January. He alleged that Hicks "knew and associated with a number of al-Qaeda senior leadership" and that "he conducted surveillance on the US embassy and other embassies". He went on to compare Hicks to the Bali bombers, expressing concern that Australians were misjudging the military commission system due to PR "smoke" from Hicks's lawyer.

James Yee, an Islamic US Army chaplain who regularly counselled Hicks while detained at Guantanamo Bay, gave a statement shortly after Hicks was freed in December 2007. He said that he did not feel Hicks was a threat to Australia, and that "Any American soldier who has been through basic training has had 50 times more training than this guy."

== Trial delays ==
=== Defence team ===
The US Army appointed United States Marine Corps Major Michael Mori as defence counsel to Hicks. Hicks's civilian defence was being funded by Dick Smith, an Australian entrepreneur. Smith has stated that he was funding the defence "to get him a fair trial".

=== Delays in legal proceedings ===
In November 2004, Hicks's trial was delayed when a US Federal Court ruled that the military commissions in question were unconstitutional. In February 2005, the Hicks's family lawyer, Stephen Kenny, who had been representing Hicks in Australia without compensation since 2002, was dismissed from the defence team and Vietnam veteran and army reservist David McLeod replaced him.

Hicks's trial was next set for 10 January 2005 but there were numerous postponements and further legal wrangling over the years that followed. In mid-February 2005, Jumana Musa, Amnesty International's legal observer at Guantanamo Bay, visited Australia to speak to the attorney-general, Philip Ruddock, (a member of Amnesty International) about the military commissions. Musa stated that Australia was "the only country that seems to have come out and said that the idea of trying somebody, their own citizen, before this process might be OK, and I think that should be a concern to anybody."

In July 2005, a US appeals court accepted the prosecution claim that because "the President of the United States issued a memorandum in which he determined that none of the provisions of the Geneva Conventions apply to our conflict with al-Qaeda in Afghanistan or elsewhere throughout the world because, among other reasons, al Qaeda is not a high contracting party to Geneva", that Hicks, among others, could be tried by a military tribunal. In July 2005, the US appeals court ruled that the trial of "Unlawful Combatants" did not come under the Geneva Convention, and that they could be tried by a military tribunal.

In early August 2005, leaked emails from former US prosecutors criticised the legal process, accusing it of being "a half-hearted and disorganised effort by a skeleton group of relatively inexperienced attorneys to prosecute fairly low-level accused in a process that appears to be rigged" and "writing a motion saying that the process will be full and fair when you don't really believe it is kind of hard, particularly when you want to call yourself an officer and lawyer". Ruddock responded by saying that the emails, written in March 2004, "must be seen as historic rather than current." In October 2005, the US government announced that if Hicks was convicted, his pre-trial detention would not count as time served against his sentence.

On 15 November 2005, District Judge Colleen Kollar-Kotelly stayed the proceeding against Hicks until the US Supreme Court had ruled on Hamdan's appeal over their constitutionality.

2006 was also fraught with delays. On 29 June 2006, in the case Hamdan v. Rumsfeld, the US Supreme Court ruled that the military tribunals were illegal under United States law and the Geneva Conventions. On 7 July 2006, a memo was issued from The Pentagon directing that all military detainees are entitled to humane treatment and to certain basic legal standards, as required by Common Article 3 of the Geneva Conventions. On 15 August 2006, Attorney-General Philip Ruddock announced that he would seek to return Hicks to Australia if the United States did not proceed quickly to lay substantive new charges. As a result of the Supreme Court decision, the United States Congress passed the Military Commissions Act of 2006 to provide an alternative method for trying detainees held at Guantanamo Bay. The Act was signed into law by President Bush on 17 October 2006.

On 6 December 2006, Hicks's legal team lodged documents with the Federal Court of Australia, arguing that the Australian government had breached its protective duty to Hicks as an Australian citizen in custody overseas, and failed to request that Hicks's incarceration by the US comply with the Geneva Convention, the International Covenant on Civil and Political Rights and the Universal Declaration of Human Rights.

On 9 March 2007, his lawyer said that David Hicks was expected to bring a case seeking to force the Australian Federal Government to ask the US government to free him. On 26 March 2007, the television journalist Leigh Sales suggested that Hicks was attempting to avoid trial by military commission, commenting "The Hicks defence strategy relies on delaying the process for so long that the Australian Government will be forced to ask for the prisoner's return."

As years passed, the legitimacy, integrity and fairness of trying Hicks before a US military commission was increasingly questioned.

=== British citizenship bid ===
In September 2005, it was realised that Hicks may be eligible for British citizenship through his mother, as a consequence of the Nationality, Immigration and Asylum Act 2002. Hicks's British heritage was revealed during a casual conversation with his lawyer, about the 2005 Ashes cricket series. The British government had previously negotiated the release of the nine British nationals incarcerated at Guantanamo Bay, so it was considered possible that these releases could be extended to Hicks if his application was successful.

Hicks applied for citizenship, but there were six months of delays. In November 2005, the British Home Office rejected Hicks's application for British citizenship on character grounds, but his lawyers appealed against the decision. On 13 December 2005, Lord Justice Lawrence Collins of the High Court ruled that then-Home Secretary Charles Clarke had "no power in law" to deprive Mr Hicks of British citizenship "and so he must be registered". The Home Office announced it would take the matter to the Court of Appeal, but Justice Collins denied them a stay of judgement, meaning that the British government must proceed with the application.

On 17 March 2006 the Home Office alleged during its appeal case that Hicks had admitted in 2003 to the Security Service (British intelligence agency MI5) that he had undergone extensive terrorist training in Afghanistan. On 12 April 2006 the Court of Appeal upheld the High Court's decision that Hicks was entitled to British citizenship. The Home Office declared it would appeal the matter again, its last option being to submit an appeal to Britain's highest court, the House of Lords, no later than 25 April.

On 5 May, however, the Court of Appeal declared that no further appeals would be allowed, and that the Home Office must grant Hicks British citizenship. Hicks's legal team claimed in the High Court on 14 June 2006 that the process of Mr Hicks's registration as a British citizen had been delayed and obstructed by the United States, which had not allowed British consular access to Hicks in order to conduct the oath of allegiance to the Queen and the United Kingdom. His military lawyer has the authority to administer oaths and offered to conduct the oath if the American government permitted it.

On 27 June, with Hicks's British citizenship confirmed, the British Foreign and Commonwealth Office announced that it would not seek to lobby for his release as it had with the other British detainees. The reason given was that Hicks was an Australian citizen when he was captured and detained and that he had received Australian consular assistance. On 5 July 2006 Hicks was registered as a British citizen, albeit only for a few hours — Home Secretary John Reid intervened to revoke Hicks's new citizenship almost as soon as it had been granted, citing section 56 of the Immigration, Asylum and Nationality Act 2006 allowing the Home Secretary to "deprive a person of a citizenship status if the Secretary of State is satisfied that deprivation is conducive to the public good". Hicks's legal team called the decision an "abuse of power", and announced they would lodge an appeal with the UK Special Immigration Appeals Commission and the High Court.

=== Seizure of legal papers ===
Following the death of three detainees, camp authorities seized prisoners' papers. Described as a security measure, it was claimed that instructions for tying a hangman's noose had been found written on stationery issued to the lawyers who met with detainees to discuss their habeas corpus requests. The Department of Justice acknowledged in court that "privileged attorney-client communications" had been seized. Hicks's lawyer questioned whether Hicks could have been part of a suicide plot, since he had spent the preceding four months in solitary confinement in a different part of the camp, and expressed concern that attorney-client confidentiality, "the last legal right that was being respected", had been violated.

== New charges ==
On 3 February 2007, the US military commission announced that it had prepared new charges against David Hicks. The drafted charges were "attempted murder" and "providing material support for terrorism", under the Military Commissions Act of 2006. Each offence carries a maximum penalty of life imprisonment. The prosecutors said they would argue for a jail term of 20 years, with an absolute minimum of 15 years to be served.

However the sentence, which was not required to take into account time already served, was ultimately up to a panel of US military officers. The Convening Authority assessed whether there was enough evidence for charges to be laid and Hicks tried. The charge of providing material support for terrorism was based on retrospectively applying the law passed in 2006.

On 16 February 2007, a nine-page charge sheet detailing the new charges was officially released by the US Defense Department.

The charge sheets alleged that:

- Around August 2001 Hicks conducted surveillance on the American and British embassies in Kabul.
- Using the name Abu Muslim Austraili he attended al-Qaeda training camps.
- Around April 2001 Hicks returned to al Farouq and trained "in al-Qa'ida's guerilla warfare and mountain tactics training course". The course included "marksmanship; small team tactics; ambush; camouflage; rendezvous techniques; and techniques to pass intelligence to al-Qa'ida operatives".
- While at the al Farouq camp, al-Qa'ida leader Osama bin Laden visited the camp on several occasions and "during one visit Hicks expressed to bin Laden his concern over the lack of English al-Qa'ida training material".
- On or about 12 September 2001 he left Pakistan after watching TV footage of the 11 September terrorist attacks to return to Afghanistan "and, again joined with al-Qa'ida".
- On his return to Afghanistan Hicks was issued an AK-47 automatic rifle and armed himself with 300 rounds of ammunition and 3 grenades to use in fighting the United States, Northern Alliance and other coalition forces.
- On or about 9 November 2001 Hicks spent about two hours on the front line at Konduz "before it collapsed and he was forced to flee".
- Around December 2001, Northern Alliance forces captured Hicks in Baghlan, Afghanistan.

On 1 March 2007, David Hicks was formally charged with material support for terrorism, and referred to trial by the special military commission. The second charge of attempted murder was dismissed by Judge Susan Crawford, who concluded there was "no probable cause" to justify the charge.

In March 2007, the prospect of further delay loomed when Mori was allegedly threatened with court martial for using contemptuous language toward the US executive, a US military discipline offence, by the chief US military prosecutor, Colonel Morris Davis, but no charges were filed against Mori.

Leaders and legal commentators in both countries criticised the prosecution as the application of ex post facto law and deemed the 5-year process to be a violation of Hicks's basic rights. The United States countered that the charges relating to Hicks were not retrospective but that the Military Commissions Act had codified offences that had been traditionally tried by military commissions and did not establish any new crimes.

Hick's defence lawyer and many international judiciary members claimed that it would have been impossible for a conviction to be found against Hicks. In her book on Hicks, Australian journalist Leigh Sales examines more than five years of reporting and dozens of interviews with insiders, and looks at the intricacies of Hicks's case from his capture in Afghanistan to life in Guantanamo Bay, including behind-the-scene establishment and workings of the military commissions.

The Indian government launched an investigation into the attacks by Hicks on their armed forces in Kashmir, during 2000.

== Pre-trial agreement and sentence ==
On 26 March 2007, following negotiations with Hicks's defence lawyers, the convening authority Judge Susan Crawford directly approved the terms of a pre-trial agreement. The agreement stipulated that Hicks enter an Alford plea to a single charge of providing material support for terrorism in return for a guarantee of a much shorter sentence than had been previously sought by the prosecution. The agreement also stipulated that the five years already spent by Hicks at Guantanamo Bay could not be subtracted from any sentence handed down, that Hicks must not speak to the media for one year nor take legal action against the United States, and that Hicks withdraw allegations that the US military abused him. Accordingly, in the first ever conviction by the Guantanamo military tribunal and the first conviction in a US war crimes trial since World War II, on 31 March, the tribunal handed down a seven-year jail sentence for the charge, suspending all but nine months.

The length of the sentence caused an "outcry" in the United States and against Defense Department lawyer Susan Crawford, who allegedly bypassed the prosecution in order to meet an agreement with the defence made before the trial. Chief prosecutor Colonel Davis was unaware of the plea deal and surprised at the nine-month sentence, telling The Washington Post "I wasn't considering anything that didn't have two digits", meaning a sentence of at least 10 years.

Ben Wizner of the American Civil Liberties Union described the case as "an unwitting symbol of our shameful abandonment of the rule of law".

=== Political manipulation claims ===
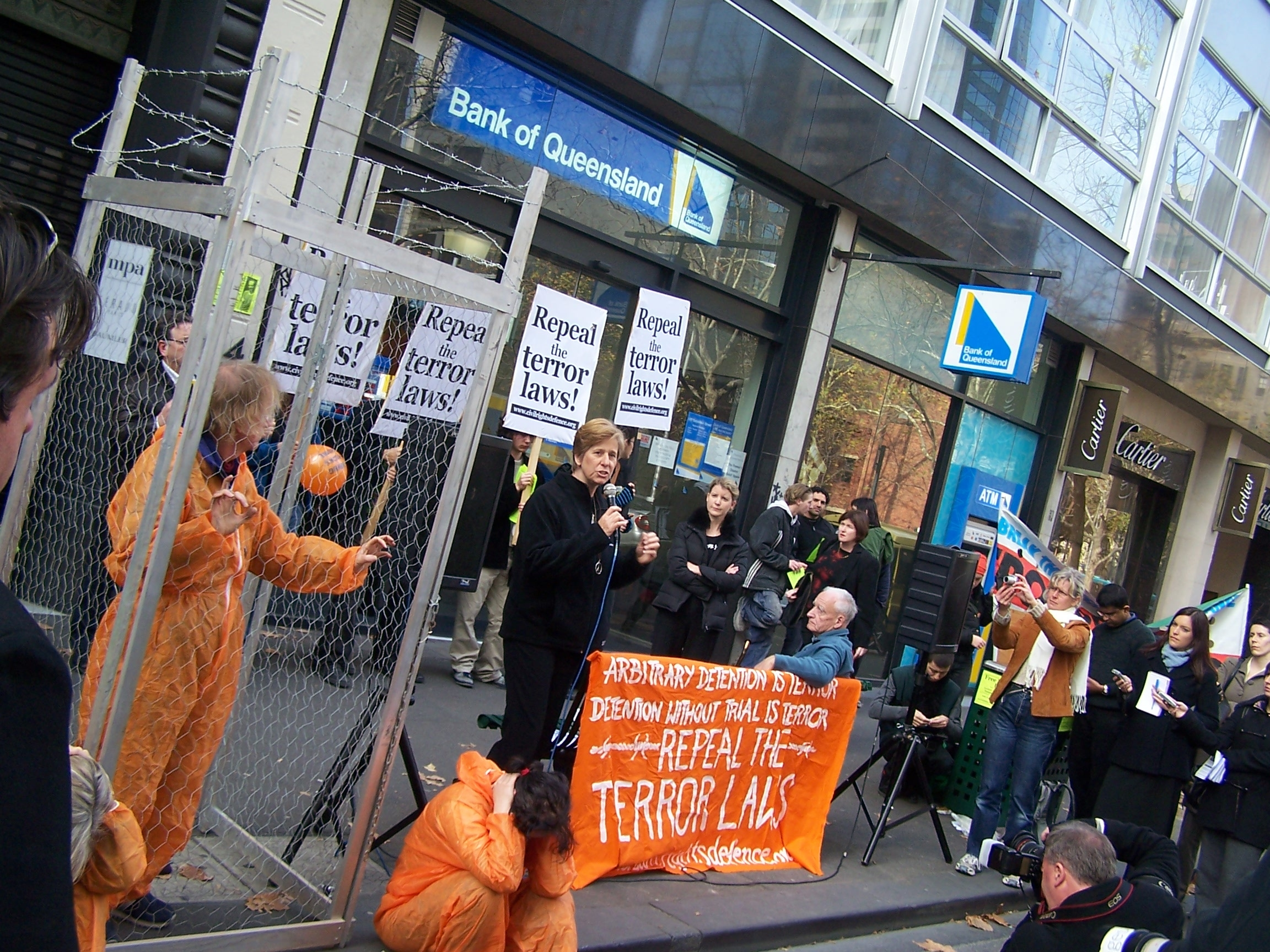
Demonstration calling for the release of David Hicks

Australian and US critics speculated that the one-year media ban was a condition requested by the Australian government and granted as a political favour. Senator Bob Brown of the Australian Greens said, "America's guarantee of free speech under its constitution would have rendered such a gag illegal in the U.S." The Law Council of Australia reported that the trial was "a contrived affair played out for the benefit of the media and the public", "designed to lay a veneer of due process over a political and pragmatic bargain", serving to corrode the rule of law. They referred to government support for the military tribunal process as shameful. In an interview, the prominent human rights lawyer and UN war crimes judge Geoffrey Robertson QC said that the pre-trial agreement "was obviously an expedient at the request of an Australian Government that needed to shore up votes". He went on to note that 'no one looks on [the agreement] as a proper judicial procedure at all.';

The Pentagon chief prosecutor Colonel Morris Davis, who had resigned from the US defence force citing dissatisfaction with the Guantanamo military commission process, alleged that the process had become highly politicised and that he had felt "pressured to do something less than full, fair and open". Davis later elaborated, saying that the Hicks trial was flawed and appeared rushed for the political benefit of the Howard government in Australia. Davis said of his former superiors that "there is no question they wanted me to stage show trials that have nothing to do with the centuries-old tradition of military justice in America". On 28 April 2008, while testifying at a pre-trial hearing at Guantanamo for Salim Hamdan, Colonel Davis said that he had "inherited" the Hicks case but did not consider it serious enough to warrant prosecution.

In November 2007, allegations from an anonymous US military officer, that a high-level political agreement had occurred in the Hicks case, were reported. The officer said that "one of our staffers was present when Vice-President Cheney interfered directly to get Hicks's plea bargain deal. He did it apparently, as part of a deal cut with Howard". Australian Prime Minister John Howard denied any involvement in Hicks's plea bargain.

The Australian government denied that the media ban had anything to do with itself or the nearing 2007 Australian federal election, with Prime Minister Howard saying "We did not impose the sentence, the sentence was imposed by the military commission and the plea bargain was worked out between the military prosecution and Mr Hicks's lawyers, and the suggestion ... that it's got something to do with the Australian election is absurd." Brigadier-General Thomas Hemingway, the legal adviser to the military tribunal convening authority, has since claimed the gag order as his idea. Federal Attorney-General Philip Ruddock stated that Australian law would not prohibit Hicks from speaking to media, although Hicks would be prevented from selling his story.

== Repatriation, release and charge ruled invalid ==
On 20 May 2007, Hicks arrived at RAAF Base Edinburgh in Adelaide, South Australia on a chartered flight reported to have cost the Australian government up to A$500,000. Attorney-General Philip Ruddock asserted that this arrangement was the consequence of US restrictions on the transit of Hicks through US airspace or territory preventing the use of less expensive commercial flights. Hicks was taken to Adelaide's Yatala Labour Prison where he was kept in solitary confinement in the state's highest-security ward, G Division.

Hicks was released on 29 December 2007 and placed under a control order obtained by the AFP earlier that month. The order required Hicks to not leave Australia, to report to a police station three times a week, and to use only an AFP-approved mobile phone SIM card. On 19 February 2008 he was given special dispensation by federal magistrate Warren Donald to leave South Australia. On 20 February 2008, Hicks moved to Abbotsford, New South Wales. A curfew between 1:00 am and 5:00 am was imposed. Hicks's control order expired in December 2008 and the AFP did not renew it.

Hicks married Aloysia Hicks, a human rights activist who studied at the University of Sydney. The Sydney Morning Herald reported that Michael Mori, one of his former military attorneys, attended the ceremony. It was also reported that Dick Smith secured employment for Hicks in a Sydney landscape gardening business.

During 2010, there were calls for Hicks to commence action to clear his name of the charges. In May 2011 his father, wife and supporters, including former politician and justice John Dowd, former Human Rights Commissioner Elizabeth Evatt, human rights lawyer Julian Burnside, along with others started a campaign to clear Hicks's name and to push for an inquiry into his alleged mistreatment in Guantanamo. Their campaign launch featured Brandon Neely, a former US soldier who guarded Hicks in Guantanamo.

In October 2012, the United States Court of Appeals ruled that the charge under which Hicks had been convicted was invalid, because the law did not exist at the time of the alleged offence, and it could not be applied retrospectively. The efforts of the US to charge Hicks have been described as "a significant departure from the Geneva Conventions and the International Covenant of Civil and Political Rights, quite apart from the US constitution", the implications being that "anyone in the world, who has suitable radical connections and who is in a war zone fighting against Americans, is guilty of a war crime".

Propublica obtained a copy of Guantanamo's Chief Prosecutor, Mark S. Martins opposition to Hicks's motion to have his charges dropped. His reply advised that Hicks's motion shouldn't be considered, on the grounds he had pleaded guilty. However, Raymond Bonner, writing in the Pacific Standard, reported that Martins's reply made the "crucial concession" that "if the appeal were allowed, 'the Court should not confirm Hicks's material-support conviction.'"

=== Autobiography ===
On 16 October 2010, Random House Australia published an autobiography of Hicks, entitled Guantanamo: My Journey. Hicks said: "This is the first time I have had the opportunity to tell my story publicly. I hope readers find the book is not only a story of injustice, but also one of hope." Early reviews of the book were relatively praising of its literary merit. The book was originally not available in US bookstores, nor for sale in online booksellers to US readers.

Australia's proceeds of crime law prevents convicted criminals profiting from describing their crimes. At the time of publication, Nikki Christer, a spokesperson for Random House, refused to comment whether Hicks was being paid for the book or whether the publisher or the author are at risk of falling foul of federal proceeds of crime laws. Christer said that Random House's financial arrangements with its authors were confidential. ABC News quoted George Williams, a legal expert from the University of New South Wales, who said "You can't proceed unless you actually know that Hicks is profiting. Unless that can be shown, then there's no basis to make an order against him." ABC News noted that his conviction might be overturned, in which case he would be free to receive royalties. By July 2011, Australia's Director of Public Prosecutions announced that legal proceedings against Hicks had commenced in the Supreme Court of New South Wales under the Proceeds of Crime Act 2002 and that a family trust into which the book sales were being paid was frozen. Legal experts believe the prosecutions case will fail. In 2004, federal proceeds of crime laws were amended to include offences covered by the US military commission, in order to prevent Hicks from profiting. As the military commission that convicted Hicks was found to be invalid, in 2011 the amendment was repealed and the existing federal proceeds of crime legislation no longer applies, although the DPP believes the federal law is still broad enough to cover Hicks. South Australia still has laws preventing Hicks from profiting, but these may not apply in regard to a trial that did not satisfy the principles of natural justice and an attempt to apply them to Hicks could, according to Williams, end up in the High Court as a major constitutional challenge.

Following the publication of his autobiography, Hicks received a standing ovation from an audience of 900 people at his first public appearance at the Sydney Writers' Festival in May 2011.

On 23 July 2012, the Director of Public Prosecutions announced that the case against Hicks had been dropped, as documentary evidence such as Hicks's guilty plea and other admissions may not be admissible in court due to the circumstances in which they were obtained. Hicks's legal team argued that they were made under "instances of severe beatings, sleep deprivation and other conditions of detention that contravene international human rights norms." Another reason to drop was that Hicks had made an "Alford plea", which Australia does not recognise. The Commonwealth has been ordered to pay Hicks's court costs. Outside court, Hicks claimed that the decision had cleared his name. Prime Minister Julia Gillard refused to comment on whether the decision meant Hicks's name had been cleared, saying it was a decision independent of government. Hicks's autobiography is believed to have sold 30,000 copies, generating around $10,000 in royalties.

=== Artistic depictions ===
==== X-Ray ====
In 2003, Chris Tugwell wrote a stage play called X-Ray, about the plight of David Hicks, as he was being held in Guantanamo Bay detention camp. Hicks's family was consulted for the play, with many of the vignettes based on the few letters they received from Mr Hicks during the first two years of his imprisonment.

The play was named the "sensation" of the 2004 Adelaide Fringe and the "highlight" of the 2005 Darwin Festival. A US production opened in November 2005. A radio adaptation, commissioned by the Australian Broadcasting Corporation, went to air on Radio National's Airplay in November 2004 and was repeated in the 2005 and 2006 summer seasons. The radio adaptation was awarded the bronze medal for Best Drama Special at the New York Festival's 2006 International Radio Awards.

==== ActNow Theatre ====
In 2007, Adelaide based theatre company ActNow Theatre originated as a street theatre performance about David Hicks created by a group of high school friends. Performances would often happened uninvited at public events, and would finish before police or security arrived.

== See also ==
- Guantanamo Bay attorneys
- Mamdouh Habib
- Ben Roberts-Smith
- Jenner & Block
- Jesselyn Radack
- John Walker Lindh
- Sabin Willett
- Shaker Aamer
- List of converts to Islam

== Bibliography ==
- Hicks, David (2010). Guantanamo: My Journey. Sydney: Random House Australia. ISBN 978-1-86471-158-5.
- Sales, Leigh (2007). Detainee 002: The Case of David Hicks. Melbourne: Melbourne University Press. ISBN 978-0-522-85400-8.

=== Media ===
- "The Trials of David Hicks" (multimedia), The Age (Fairfax Media). Credits to Jane Holroyd, Matthew Absalom-Wong, Andrew Webster, Simon Johnanson.
- The President Versus David Hicks (2004). A documentary about the "Australian Taliban", David Hicks. The film follows the struggles of David's father. Produced by SBS TV. Directed by Curtis Levy and Bentley Dean. Written by Luke Thomas Crowe. 52 minutes.
- "David Hicks: his first public address since the publication of his memoir", interview with Donna Mulhearn (audio), Radio National goes to the 2011 Sydney Writers' Festival (Australian Broadcasting Corporation) (2011).
- "Former Guantanamo detainee David Hicks speaks with the World Socialist Web Site" By Richard Phillips (22 October 2011).
- Assange plea deal has echoes of David Hicks. By Phillip Coorey (25 June 2024)
