= Mail privileges of Guantanamo Bay detainees =

There have been mixed reports of the limits on Guantanamo detainees' mail privileges.

== Master Sergeant Debra A. Tart's account ==
On July 23, 2002 Master Sergeant Debra A. Tart gave an interview to the American Forces Press Service about the detainees' mail privileges. The report asserts that the detainees were all offered an opportunity to send a postcard to their family, shortly after their arrival, telling their family where they were. Many of the detainees' families have reported they did not learn the detainee was in Guantanamo until 2006, when the Department of Defense was forced to publish a list of all the detainees held in Guantanamo.

Tart told the American Forces Press Service that the 564 detainees had sent out 1,600 pieces of mail, through her office, during the camp's first six months, and had received 300 replies. She added that some detainees had sent out mail with the visitors from the International Committee of the Red Cross on their quarterly inspections.

== Lieutenant Wade Brown's affidavit ==
In response to a habeas corpus petition, on March 25, 2005, First Lieutenant Wade M. Brown submitted an affidavit describing how the detainees' email was processed.

- Brown reported he had been first the assistant officer in charge, and then the officer in charge, of a staff of sixteen staff who processed the detainees' mail.
- Brown reported that in the previous six months his office had processed 14,000 pieces of mail—over two, per detainee, per month.
- According to Brown:

Detainees cannot lose mail privileges for any reason, including as part of disciplinary action or interrogation.

Brown described two of the three routes through which detainees were permitted to receive mail:

US Postal Service	Camp authorities provided every detainee with two sheets of stationery, and four post cards, per month.; Average processing time for incoming and outgoing mail is about two weeks.; Brown's staff place postage on the detainee' mail, and deposit it in US Postal Service boxes.
ICRC	Representatives of the International Committee of the Red Cross were allowed to visit the camp four times a year. During their meeting they were allowed to give detainees additional stationery.; Letters written by detainees and given to the ICRC is then delivered by them to Brown's processing unit. Following processing these letters were returned to the ICRC for delivery.
habeas correspondence	Brown stated that there was a third mechanism for detainees to send and receive correspondence with their habeas attorneys. But he did not describe this mechanism.

== Detainees' accounts ==
Some Guantanamo detaineess, such as Abdul Razzaq Hekmati, testified that during their stay in Guantanamo they had not received a single response to any of the letters they sent out.

Lawyers for Mani Al Utaybi described trying to have their first letter delivered to him, to inform him that his relative had secured their help on his behalf, for over a year prior to his suicide on June 10, 2006—but camp authorities had refused to deliver their mail.

The Government then informed counsel in December that the detainee had been positively identified because the newer version of the name more closely matched a detainee. However, the Government refused to provide the detainee's identification ISN number and also refused to allow the lawyers to send a letter to their client until the attorneys displayed their "authority to initiate litigation on behalf of the petitioner."

During an interview on Chicago Public Radio's This American Life, Joe Margulies reported:

Another lawyer discovered when he first got there that his client, a middle-aged gentleman with five children who is a London businessman, was picked up in the Gambia, and he was not getting any mail from his family. And he could not understand it because he felt abandoned and alone from his five children. And the lawyer had the presence of mind to ask what was the matter was and he discovered that 16 letters were in the military's possession (that) they had refused to deliver. And when they did finally deliver them, someone had actually taken the time to redact out the words from the children: "We miss you, Daddy. We love you, Daddy. We're thinking of you." That is apparently not right, because it disrupts the sense of isolation and despair that they are trying to cultivate.

Carol Rosenberg, writing in the Miami Herald, quoted Kristin Wilhelm, one of the detainees' attorneys, about the censorship of hand-drawn greeting cards her client had prepared for her and her colleagues. Recent rule changes allowed detainees to be issued crayons, and allowed to make drawings. Her client, Yemeni Suleiman al Nahdi, drew greeting cards for her and her colleagues—which military censors would not allow through. According to Wilhelm:

It was always my view that the government was afraid to allow the drawings to be released because it humanized my client.

== Captives' attorney/client privileged mail ==
On November 1, 2011, The Washington Post reported on the attempts of nine of detainees' military defense attorney to challenge the reading of their lawyers representing detainees at Guantanamo Bay, Cuba, say authorities at the military base have begun reading privileged attorney-client communication — in a sharp break with past practice. The Washington Post called this "a sharp break with past practice". According to the United Press International an unnamed military official attributed the change in policy to the recent appointment of the new camp commandant Rear Admiral David B. Woods. UPI reported that up until October camp officials would open the privileged mail in front of the detainee, to confirm that the envelope did not contain contraband items, and then would give it to the detainee, without reading it.

Khalid Sheik Mohammed's attorney was one of the lawyers who wrote a letter to William K. Lietzau, deputy assistant secretary of defense for rule of law and detainee policy. They argued that the rules for military commissions specifically protect attorney-client mail. The Washington Post published a passage from the letter.

Violations of the attorney-client privilege are acutely egregious in the context of death penalty litigation where the Supreme Court has long held that heightened due process applies. It is important to note that the legal materials discussed are not classified.

In response, the Chief Defense Counsel (United States) ordered the attorneys under his supervision to stop sending privileged communications to Guantanamo prisoners. Approximately two years after the policy change, in November 2013, the Guantanamo military commission issued an order setting up a "privilege team" to act as an intermediary.

== 2006 rule changes ==
In late 2006, Captain Patrick M. McCarthy, Joint Task Force Guantanamo's Staff Judge Advocate submitted an affidavit about further restrictions the Department of Defense wanted to place on mail between Guantanamo habeas counsels and their clients. He asserted that attorneys for the prisoners had provided a copy of a book on Abu Ghraib, a speech given at an Amnesty International conference about the war on terror, and other materials, and that such materials threatened prison security.
