= Telephone access of Guantanamo Bay detainees =

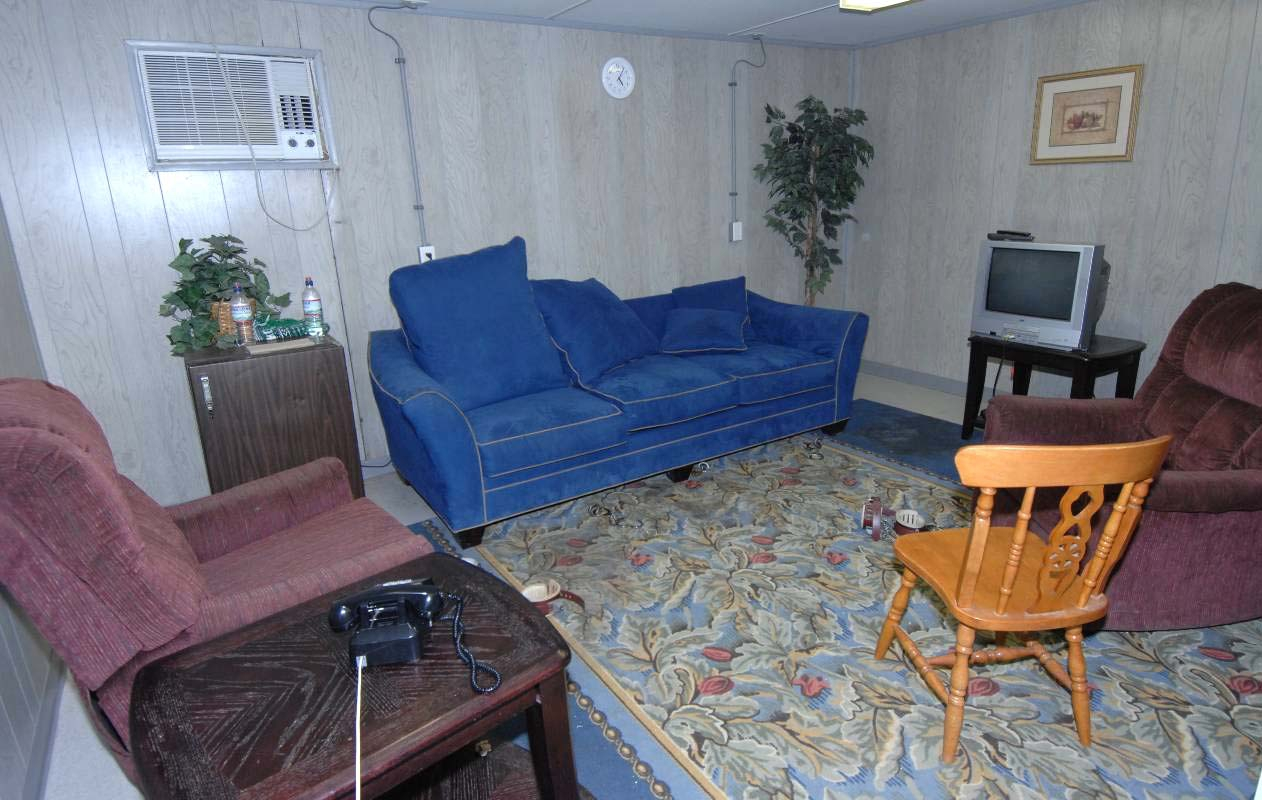
Camp one Guantanamo has a lounge for captives to phone home.

After the United States established the Guantanamo Bay detention camp at its naval base in Cuba, officials occasionally allowed Guantanamo captives' phone calls to their family. In 2008 the Joint Task Force Guantanamo that manages the camps developed rules regarding phone calls: all detainees who met certain conditions were allowed to make one call home per year.

On September 29, 2009, the International Committee of the Red Cross announced that Guantanamo captives and their families would be allowed to communicate through a two-way video link. Since May 2008, a similar facility has been available to captives held in extrajudicial detention in Bagram Theater Internment Facility. This facility has been available to American GIs for many years. The first video call was made between a Pakistani captive and his family. His family traveled to the ICRC's Peshawar office, where one end of the video link had been set up.

== Phone calls for detainees ==
While some phone calls to families had been allowed at the Guantanamo Bay detention camp, in 2008 the Joint Military Task Force developed policy and procedures to allow all detainees who satisfied certain conditions to make one phone call annually. Facilities were upgraded and in 2009, the Red Cross assisted with setting up video calls to its centers overseas.

- When Salim Ahmed Hamdan was allowed a call home, on August 6, 2008, after his Guantanamo Military Commission acquitted him of conspiracy and convicted him of material support for terrorism, his was the 107th call.
- Ibrahim Ahmed Mahmoud al Qosi, a Yemeni who faced charges before a Guantanamo military commission, told his Presiding Officer he had not been able to acquire a Yemeni lawyer because he had not been able to contact his family during his six years of detention. On May 22, 2008 his Presiding Officer ordered that arrangements should be made for him to have a one-hour phone call home, by July 1, 2008. Pauline Storum, deputy commander for Public Affairs for Joint Task Force Guantanamo, told reporters later that same day that arrangements for the call had already been put in place, and that the call had taken place.

Suzanne Lachelier, the officer who had been authorized to coordinate the call, said she was surprised to read newspaper reports that the call had taken place. She said she had not begun to make the arrangements. Storun later sent a retraction to reporters, without explanation of the error.

- Muhammad Hamid Al Qarani, one of the younger captives, was allowed his first phone call in 2009. Rather than calling his family, he called Sami Al Hajj, a recently released detainee who is an Al Jazeera journalist. As reported by Al-Jazeera, he told Al Hajj that abuse had continued at the camp despite the election of United States President Barack Obama. Al Qarani was transferred to Saudi Arabia on June 13, 2009, to undergo a rehabilitation programme, less than two months after the call.
- Abdul Al Salam Al Hilal was allowed his first call home in April 2009. His two sons died two days later, in an apparent accident with a hand grenade. In a second phone call in August 2009, he told his family that he feared he would be assassinated in Guantanamo.

== See also ==
- Captive's library in Guantanamo
- Guantanamo captives' mail privileges
