= Terry Hicks =

Australian activist

- Born: 1945 (age 80–81)

Terry Hicks (born 1945) is an Australian man who is known for his campaign for his son, David, who was convicted by the United States of America Guantanamo Military Commission under the Military Commissions Act of 2006 on charges of providing material support for terrorism.

Terry Hicks' campaign included staying in a Guantanamo Bay-sized cage on a New York pavement and outside a convention centre in Adelaide, confronting Prime Minister John Howard on talkback radio and being interviewed by al-Jazeera.

In 2006, Hicks was nominated by ACT Chief Minister Jon Stanhope for the Australian Father of the Year award. A documentary, The President Versus David Hicks, was made about Hicks' attempts to discover what happened to his son.

Hicks is married and has another child besides David.
