= Carol Rosenberg =

American journalist

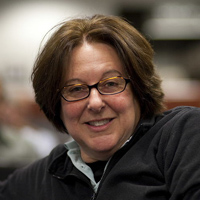
- Born: Canada
- Citizenship: Canadian/American
- Education: University of Massachusetts Amherst
- Occupation: Journalist
- Relatives: Joel Rosenberg (brother)
- Writing career
- Language: English

Carol Rosenberg is a senior journalist at The New York Times. Long a military-affairs reporter at the Miami Herald, from January 2002 into 2019 she reported on the operation of the United States' Guantanamo Bay detention camps, at its naval base in Cuba. Her coverage of detention of captives at the Guantanamo Bay detention camp has been praised by her colleagues and legal scholars, and in 2010 she spoke about it by invitation at the National Press Club. Rosenberg had previously covered events in the Middle East. In 2011, she received the Robert F. Kennedy Journalism Award for her nearly decade of work on the Guantanamo Bay detention camp.

== Biography ==
Carol Rosenberg was born to a Canadian mother and American father in Canada. Her family also lived in Northwood, North Dakota, before moving to West Hartford, Connecticut. Her siblings include an older brother, the late Joel Rosenberg (1954-2011), who became a writer of science fiction novels.

She studied and graduated in 1981 from the University of Massachusetts Amherst. From her freshman year, she started writing for the university newspaper, the Massachusetts Collegian, and at one time was Editor-in-Chief.

== Career ==
Rosenberg worked for a short time as a court reporter before starting with UPI in New England. In 1987, she was assigned by UPI as its Jerusalem correspondent. During that period, she learned much about the region, and became accustomed to working in the Middle East.

In 1990, Rosenberg was hired as a foreign correspondent by the Miami Herald; she covered many international stories for them, including in war zones. She went to the 1991 Gulf War in the Middle East and conducted other extensive reporting from the area. At the time, Clarence Page wrote that at one point, Rosenberg and Susan Sachs of Newsday were barred by Pentagon officials from reporting on the 1st Marine Division's activity during the 1991 Gulf War. She regularly worked to report activities that the government was trying to keep hidden.

Since January 2002, Rosenberg has covered the Guantanamo Bay detention camp as her main field, together with associated United States Supreme Court cases affecting the detainees and camp operations. Her managing editor Rick Hirsh at the Miami Herald encouraged her to cover it "aggressively." She travels there monthly and has sometimes stayed for lengthy periods. Arriving after the US constructed the facility, she and other journalists saw the arrival of the first detainees.

In addition to her written journalism, Rosenberg has spoken about Guantanamo, the government's constraints on the press at the facility, and related issues of reporting on PBS's NewsHour and CBC Radio's international news program Dispatches.

== Coverage of Guantanamo Bay ==
Rosenberg has covered in detail the conditions at the camps, the tribunals (also called terrorism trials) and, in 2006, the reported suicides of prisoners at the Guantanamo Bay detention camp. She explored the lives of prisoners, writing about one so afraid to return to his native Tajikistan that he asked to stay at the prison in Cuba. She has described conditions, including the refrigeration of bottled water at the camp, where it is stored in a two-ton shipping refrigerator meant for the dead. Rosenberg has described tensions among the military, for example, one general verbally attacking another general as "abusive, bullying, unprofessional" in a dispute over trial tactics at the war court.

In The Least Worst Place, Karen Greenberg described Rosenberg regularly scanning the bases' flagpoles, as new flags could mark the arrival of new military units; she also asked about them at briefings to keep up to date on the Americans stationed there. On the day the first camp commander was to leave the base, Rosenberg noticed a new flag, with unfamiliar heraldry. At his last briefing, the retiring camp commander told her that he would delay answering her questions about the flag until the end of the briefing. He presented Rosenberg with the flag, which he had ordered prepared specifically to honor her diligence in reporting. The heraldry was designed to represent her own personal history.

Following the official report that three captives had committed suicide on June 10, 2006, camp authorities ordered Rosenberg and three other journalists there to leave the facility, temporarily causing a news blackout. Rosenberg and Carol J. Williams of the Los Angeles Times had arrived early to prepare for a June 12 tribunal hearing. Following the reported deaths, all hearings were cancelled, but Camp Commandant Harry Harris initially gave the two reporters permission to stay. Subsequently Commander Jeffrey D. Gordon, a DOD spokesman, announced that all the reporters were to be sent home. According to Gordon, other organizations had threatened to sue if their reporters were not also given access to the base.

Rosenberg returned to Guantanamo. Her coverage has included the constraints on the press at that facility, which she has described as "outside the rule of law."

On January 11, 2012, Rosenberg was interviewed by Public Radio International on the tenth anniversary of the arrival of the first twenty Guantanamo captives.

On June 18, 2013, Rosenberg republished a list of the dispositions of the Guantanamo captives, which was sent to her in response to a Freedom of Information Act request. The list Rosenberg was given contained 240 names and was dated January 22, 2010. It was the work of the Guantanamo Joint Task Force, which had been authorized on January 22, 2009 under the President Barack Obama administration.

On January 8, 2019, Rosenberg broke a story describing how partially redacted transcripts from a pre-trial hearing of Guantanamo Military Commission of Khalid Sheikh Mohammed, seemed to indicate that Director of the Central Intelligence Agency, Gina Haspel, had been the "Chief of Base" of a clandestine CIA detention site in Guantanamo, in the 2003-2004 period.

== Sexual harassment complaint ==
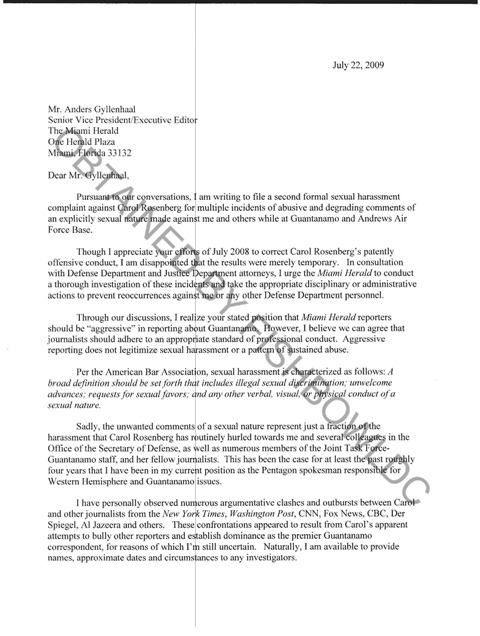
Commander Gordon's three page letter of July 22, 2009 was published on July 24, 2009 -- page 1 page 2, and page 3.

On July 22, 2009, Rosenberg was named in a sexual harassment complaint by the US Navy Commander, Jeffrey D. Gordon, a spokesman for DOD for the Western Hemisphere, including the Guantanamo detention camp, who complained that Rosenberg had used coarse language "of an explicitly sexual nature". When the complaint first broke, Carol Williams, a reporter at the Los Angeles Times and friend of Rosenberg, dismissed Gordon's letter, saying, "This is an attempt to discredit a journalist who has managed to transcend incredible odds to cover a story of tremendous significance to the American public." Jamie McIntyre, a former CNN Pentagon correspondent, said of Rosenberg's interactions with Gordon: "I didn't think there was any sort of sexual abuse, unless you're telling me a naval officer, a sailor, isn't used to hearing anatomical references in anger. It sounds like an overreaction on everybody's part." He said Rosenberg "was always professional in her demeanor when I was around her."

On August 3, 2009, the Miami Herald reported that it had concluded its internal inquiry on the matter. After interviewing both reporters and other Guantanamo staff who would have been present during the incidents, the internal inquiry "did not find corroboration" for Gordon's claims. Its findings acknowledged that Rosenberg had used profanity. Elissa Vanaver, the Miami Herald's Vice President of Human Resources, wrote to the Pentagon to inform the authorities of the paper's conclusions reached by their inquiry.

== Awards ==
In 2011, Rosenberg won the Robert F. Kennedy Journalism Award for her reporting from Guantánamo Bay.

In 2014, Rosenberg was honored by the Reporters Committee for Freedom of the Press.

On March 20, 2015, Rosenberg was listed as the 2015 awardee of the Scripps Howard Foundation's Edward Willis Scripps Award for distinguished service to the First Amendment. Awardees receive a trophy and $10,000.

== Use of Google Glass at Guantanamo ==
When Google was developing a small, standalone, computer, with built-in streaming video, called Google Glass, it chose a few thousand individuals who were invited to be beta testers. Rosenberg was selected to be a beta-tester. There was confusion, initially, when she first took the glasses to Guantanamo, as to whether she should be allowed to use them there. However, since August 2013, she has been allowed to use them, and she has posted a number of video blogs.

== Possible early retirement ==
On February 5, 2019, The Washington Post's media critic, Eric Wemple, reported McClatchy, the Miami Herald's parent company, had announced that conditions within the news industry would force it to offer early retirement to senior staff, including Rosenberg. Wemple quoted former Miami Herald managing editor, Mark Seibel:

“She’s the expert. There’s no one in the United States that knows more about Gitmo than Carol Rosenberg.. I assigned Carol to Gitmo and jokingly told her not to come back until after the executions had happened.”

Wemple quoted Charlie Savage, of The New York Times:

“Her work on Guantanamo is an area where The Miami Herald and McClatchy have regularly distinguished themselves with reporting of national and international significance that cannot be found anywhere else. Guantanamo was one of the costliest and most disputed national-security legal-policy experiments by the Bush administration after 9/11 — and it’s not over even though the Bush and Obama administrations eventually got rid of most of the detainees Bush brought there.”

In its reporting, the Miami New Times pointed out that McClatchy's CEO Craig Forman received a bonus of $900,000 on top of his base salary of $823,846 and $552,684 in stock awards, in 2017, writing "while the news is soul-numbing for reporters, life is still apparently pretty good for Forman and the rest of the newspaper chain's corporate board."

== Hired by The New York Times ==
On February 20, 2019, the Pulitzer Center announced that The New York Times would be hiring Rosenberg. The Pulitzer Center had been covering part of Rosenberg's salary since 2018. After McClatchy's buyout offer, the Pulitzer Center helped her find a new position. They will provide support to The New York Times to help support her position because they consider her ongoing coverage of Guantanamo to be important.

== See also ==
- Telephone access of Guantanamo Bay detainees
