= Stephen Kenny (lawyer) =

Australian lawyer

Stephen Kenny is a prominent Australian lawyer. He acted as the original lawyer for David Hicks, a Guantánamo Bay detainee and other Australians overseas including Julian Assange and Robert Langdon. Kenny also acts for native title groups across Australia.

Kenny has practiced as a barrister and solicitor in Australia for over 30 years. He has maintained a strong interest in civil liberties and is the past Chairperson of the South Australian Council for Civil Liberties. Throughout his career, Kenny has acted for Indigenous people, including on personal and native title land claim matters as well as undertaking pro-bono work for migrant families and community groups.

In the 1990s he acted for the Ngarrindjeri during the Hindmarsh Island bridge controversy. Kenny acted for the Ngarrindjeri men during the Hindmarsh Island Royal Commission and later acted as instructing solicitor for Doreen Kartinyeri in the High Court. Kartinyeri v Commonwealth [1998] HCA 22 (popularly known as the Hindmarsh Island bridge case) is the leading Australian constitutional case on the power of the Commonwealth government with respect to its dealings with Aboriginal people.

Kenny has acted for Aboriginal groups in relation to 9 successful native title determinations and negotiated the first native title petroleum agreements. Kenny represents Aboriginal native title corporations and has been the lawyer for a number of groups for over 30 years.

In January 2002 after reading press reports of the detention of David Hicks at Guantánamo Bay, Kenny offered his services to his Adelaide family. With permission of the family, Kenny commenced legal proceedings in the United States for a Writ of Habeas Corpus against President Bush and the US Military who were detaining Hicks. Known as Rasul v. Bush, the legal proceedings resulted in the United States Supreme Court ruling that Guantánamo Bay was within the jurisdiction of the US Courts. This led to a number of other detainees taking action against their detention in US Federal Courts.

From 2010 Kenny acted for Robert Langdon, a former Australian soldier imprisoned in Afghanistan. Mr Langdon was released in 2016.

In 2022 Kenny was appointed as the Australian Solicitor for Julian Assange who returned to Australia in July 2024.

In 2025 Kenny acted as instructing solicitor, with his colleague, Leonora Herweijer, in the successful High Court appeal of Stuart v State of South Australia [2025] HCA 12 on behalf of the Arabana People. In a 7-0 judgement the High Court confirmed that connection can be met by spiritual connection.

== Awards ==
In 2004, Kenny won the Knights of the Southern Cross Social Justice Award and the Human Rights and Equal Opportunity Commission Law Award.

He was nominated for the Australian of the Year Awards in 2005.

Kenny has won the 2010 Law Society of South Australia's justice award.

Kenny was a finalist for the 2014 Law Council of Australia Law Award.
