= Patrick M. McCarthy (lawyer) =

American lawyer and navy officer

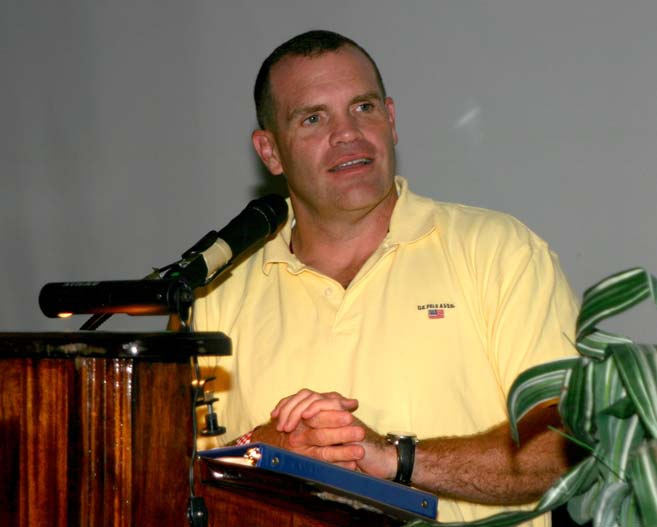
- Military career
- Branch: United States Navy
- Rank: Captain

Patrick M. McCarthy is a retired American lawyer and officer in the United States Navy. He was appointed Commander on July 12, 2001. He was appointed Captain on May 23, 2006.

McCarthy was Staff Judge Advocate in Okinawa, Japan from November 1992 until July 1995, legal advisor to the Commandant of Midshipmen at the United States Naval Academy from July 1995 to August 1997, Staff Judge Advocate to the Iceland Defense Force from June 1998 to July 2001, Staff Judge Advocate of Joint Task Force Guantanamo from May 2006 to July 2008, and in 2010 was Staff Judge advocate to Joint Task Force 435 (TF 435), which is responsible for U.S. detention policy in Afghanistan.

== United States Naval Academy ==
Then Lt. Cdr. McCarthy, while posted as legal advisor to the Commandant of Midshipmen, was involved in the arrest and eventual conviction of Diane Zamora for murdering Adrianne Jones. When McCarthy was informed Midshipmen had indicated Ms. Zamora had participated in the murder, McCarthy called authorities in the Fort Worth, Texas area, and Ms. Zamora was finally arrested, and later convicted, for the crime. McCarthy was eventually called as a witness at the trial of Zamora.

== Guantanamo Bay ==
McCarthy was appointed Joint Task Force Guantanamo's Staff Judge Advocate, its lead attorney, from May 2006 to mid-2008.

He was interviewed on the program, "Fresh Air":

Guantanamo has been [incorrectly] painted as a place where detainees are sent and are held incognito, where they lack access to courts, their family members and the media. We are holding those individuals here who should be held based on the fact that they are enemy combatants, and they continue to pose a threat to the U.S.

He filed an affidavit, accompanying a court filing, noting that detainee lawyers had gathered information from the detainees for news organizations, and the lawyers had provided detainees with accounts of events outside Guantanimo, like a speech at an Amnesty International conference and details of terrorist attacks. Such information, his affidavit said, threatens the security of the camp, as it could incite violence among the detainees. He said that in one case a detainee's attorney took questions from a BBC reporter with him into a meeting with a detainee at the camp, and that such indirect interviews are "inconsistent with the purpose of counsel access" at the prison.

Captain McCarthy gave testimony at the trial of Omar Khadr, where he stated "Mr. Khadr was always very respectful...He had a pleasant demeanor. He was friendly." Captain McCarthy went on to state "Fifteen-year-olds, in my opinion, should not be held to the same level of accountability as adults", arguing that Omar Khadr has the potential to be rehabilitated.

== Afghanistan ==
In 2010, Captain McCarthy served as Staff Judge Advocate to Joint Task Force 435, which is responsible for U.S. detention policy in Afghanistan. After this 13-month tour, Captain McCarthy was stationed as Staff Judge Advocate at United States Pacific Command on August 1, 2011.

== PwC and BRN ==
Retired from the Navy, McCarthy is currently the leader of PwC's Global Intelligence Operations Center as a senior Director in the Strategic Threat and International Anti-corruption & Program Integrity Practice Groups. In this role, he advises clients globally in both the public and private sectors on myriad operational, ethical, regulatory and crisis related challenges. He is also the Principal Officer of BRN Associates, Inc., together with Vice Chairman David Allen White.
