= Chris Tugwell =

Australian playwright and screenwriter

- Education: Flinders University
- Occupation: Writer
- Writing career
- Notable works: X-Ray (play); Dinosaur Theory (book)
- Notable awards: Carclew Fellowship (1996)

Chris Tugwell is an Australian dramatist, screenwriter, and author. Best known as a playwright, his most successful play was X-Ray, which he also produced.

He was a dancer and actor before turning to writing full-time. He also teaches screenwriting, and is the author of the textbook Dinosaur Theory.

== Early life and education ==
Chris Tugwell was born in England and moved to Australia with his family when he was seven. His father was a successful architect and his mother was an amateur opera singer.

He attended private schools in Adelaide and then Flinders University Drama Centre, where he studied acting with Zora Semberova and Yutaka Wada. While still at university he performed as a dancer with the E-Motion Dance Company in works by choreographer Moshe Kedem and in the New Opera production Renard the Fox.

== Career ==
Tugwell was originally a dancer and actor, performing with theatre-in-education companies.

He taught high school English and drama in the regional South Australian city of Whyalla, where he also wrote his first play.

He returned to Adelaide and worked as an actor, writer and director with a number of theatre-in-education companies, performing in hundreds of schools across South Australia. His most notable appearance was in Magpie Theatre's world première season of British playwright David Holman's No Worries at the 1984 Adelaide Festival. He turned to full-time writing in 1984.

He has written more than fifty scripts for film, stage, radio, television, documentary and multimedia. His work has been performed by such companies as Patch Theatre, Urban Myth Theatre Company, Magpie Theatre, and The Acting Company. His play Seasonally Adjusted was a showcase work at the 1987 Come Out Festival. In 1984, Runaway toured regional NSW for twelve months.

Tugwell was a writer for the ABC children's TV series Finders Keepers (1991), directed by Scott Hicks. His first novel for teenagers, Kid Brother, was published in 1994, and he was awarded the Carclew Fellowship (for writers for young people) at the 1996 Adelaide Festival of Arts.

His stage play X Ray, about the plight of Australian David Hicks held in Guantanamo Bay detention camp, was named the 'sensation' of the 2004 Adelaide Fringe Festival and the 'highlight' of the 2005 Darwin Festival. A US production opened in November 2005. A radio adaptation, commissioned by the ABC, went to air on Radio National's Airplay in November 2004 and was repeated in the 2005 and 2006 summer seasons

Tugwell has run writing workshops around South Australia, including the screenwriting course Pictures on Paper, and taught scriptwriting at the Adelaide College of the Arts from 1998. He has worked as a script consultant and dramaturg on numerous stage, feature film and TV projects and helped establish the Insite Unproduced Screenplay Competition for the Adelaide Film Festival.

His book Dinosaur Theory – uncovering a new approach to screenwriting (2012) is a distillation of 25 years as a teacher, editor and screenwriter.

In 2014 he produced, wrote and directed the short film Bastard.

== Other activities ==
He was a member of the South Australian Committee of the Australian Writers' Guild for 16 years, and chair from 1996 to 2005. He was on the National Executive from 1992 to 1996, and was a founding board member of the Australian Writers' Guild Authorship Collecting Society (AWGACS), and chair from 2004 to 2007. He was made a Life Member of the Guild in 2012.

Tugwell also served on the board of the Australian Script Centre for six years.

== Awards and honours ==
- 1996: Adelaide Festival Literary Awards – Carclew Fellowship

== Works ==
=== Plays ===
- 2011: Finding Home
- 2003: X Ray
- 1995: River of Dreams
- 1994: Landings
- 1991: Finders Keepers, parts 3 & 5 (television show)
- 1987: Seasonally Adjusted
- 1984: Runaway

=== Books ===
- Tugwell, Chris; Bath, Maude (2014). It's Hard to Catch Goldfish with Paper Nets. p. 104.
- Tugwell, Chris (2012). Dinosaur Theory: Uncovering a New Approach to Screenwriting. CreateSpace. p. 154. ISBN 978-1475275780.
- Tugwell, Chris; Mitchell, Barry (2000). Writing for Film and television. South Australian Department of Further Education, Employment, Science & Technology. p. 195. ISBN 1865063169.
- Laughton, Verity; Tugwell, Chris (2011). Writing for Performance. South Australian Department of Further Education, Employment, Science & Technology. p. 135. ISBN 9781742821467.
- Starke, Ruth; Tugwell, Chris, eds. (1998). Solo Spots: Senior Drama Monologues. Oxford University Press. p. 138. ISBN 0195506405.
- Tugwell, Chris (1994). Kid Brother. HarperCollins Publishers Australia. p. 198. ISBN 0207182043.
