= Guantanamo: My Journey =

2010 autobiography by David Hicks

- Author: David Hicks
- Language: English
- Publisher: Random House
- Publication date: 16 October 2010
- Publication place: Australia
- Media type: Print (hardback, paperback)
- Pages: 456 (first edition, hardback)
- ISBN: 978-1-86471-158-5

Guantanamo: My Journey is the autobiography of David Hicks, an Australian who was held in the US Guantanamo Bay detention camp for five and a half years before eventually pleading guilty to the charge of "material support to terrorism" in a military commission trial. The first 174 pages of the book details his early life, and subsequent standard military training in Kosovo, Pakistan and Afghanistan. The book heavily details Hicks' time spent in Guantanamo Bay prison following his capture in 2001. The book is the first published account by Hicks of his time spent at Guantanamo Bay and the events leading up to his arrest. In August 2011 assets from the book were frozen as the Commonwealth DPP attempted to pursue Hicks through the courts to stop him profiting from the autobiography. The case was dropped in 2012.

== Synopsis ==
The book details Hicks' life to 2010, providing not only vivid details of his imprisonment in Cuba, but provides details for all of Hicks' life. The first half of the book catalogues the events leading up to his arrest in 2001, starting with his early childhood. The second half of the book accounts for Hicks' time in captivity, his trial, and return to Australia.

== Praise for the book ==
Noam Chomsky has praised Hicks' book as "very much worth reading". Jason Leopold, lead investigative reporter of Truthout, who landed the first interview with Hicks, described how moved he was by Hicks' book and the torture he endured. The interview was subsequently re-published in The Public Record Other journalists have noted the detailed descriptions of Hicks' torture;

Hicks details guards who punished him for simply studying his legal options. He often asked for medical care to help stress fractures. Little help was given. ‘'You’re not meant to be healthy or comfortable,’’ he was told. Faeces flooded the cage where Hicks lived and slept, ignored by the American officials. Dirty and unwashed clothes were common. Deafening loud music was pumped into cells to disorientate prisoners. Hicks writes of having to urinate on himself while being shackled during countless hours of interrogation. Detainees on hunger strikes were regularly force-fed.

A review published by a division of Australia's Socialist Alliance stated that the book was an honest account, and expressed outrage at his treatment in the hands of the US military.

Any one of our sons, nephews or cousins could have got caught up in this horror story. The brutality of the US army and its violence against supposed enemies is unbelievable. Hicks' accounts are supported by the words of top US army officials as well as by the US political machine, in particular George W. Bush.

== Criticism ==
Upon release, the book was criticised by a few journalists for allegedly failing to express the 'full story,' particularly the details surrounding his training in Afghanistan. Author and ABC Journalist, Sally Neighbour, criticised the book, labeling it "deceptive and disappointing." "The problem with Hicks's book is that out of the 456 pages he spends less than one page talking about his training with Al Qaeda. He disguised this as being his first opportunity to speak which of course it's not. He's had many opportunities; dozens or perhaps hundreds of interview requests. I don't think that David Hicks wanted to be questioned. He wanted to put forward his version of events without being questioned. Therefore as a result we have this very self-serving and one-sided and not entirely honest account." Journalist Mark Davis disagreed, stating that he believed Hick's told the truth in his book, adding "The guy is traumatised. He's also not highly educated. And he's certainly not articulate. He doesn't want to be made mince meat of for the pleasure of a viewing audience. He did five years in virtual solitary confinement. The fact that he's able to string words together at all is a testimony to him." Davis stated that because there was still a possibility that he could be "re-charged under this very curious settlement he reached with the American and Australian authorities" he understood if Hicks was being cautious" but that he "found it nevertheless a revealing account."

In response to the criticism, Hicks finally spoke in December 2010 about the book, two months after its release.

I have been accused of cowardice, fear and of having something to hide, but the straightforward answer to these unreasonable accusations is that after spending six years in isolation with little human contact, contact that was often hostile and abnormal, the most comfortable way for me to communicate is by writing. I cannot control interfering emotions. Lights, cameras and being the focus of an interview is reminiscent of a Guantanamo interrogation. This is why I chose to write a book.

In response to claims that he omitted details surrounding his training in Afghanistan, Hicks said:

The truth is, I included detailed descriptions in earlier drafts but ended up editing it out. I couldn't imagine the public wanting to wade through pages of anecdotes such as how I learnt to smear mud on my face and camouflage a uniform, or basic map-reading and using compasses. I didn't think the audience wanted to be bored with detail about building strength, stamina and endurance day after day by marching further and further with increasing weight in a backpack. These were situations very far removed from acts of terrorism such as bomb-making, hijacking or targeting civilians.

— David Hicks
