= Guantanamo Bay detention camp =

United States military prison in southeastern Cuba

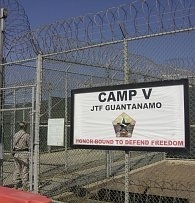
- Camp Five Gate at Guantanamo Bay

- Location within Cuba Guantanamo Bay detention camp (the Caribbean)
- Location: Guantanamo Bay Naval Base, Cuba; 19°54′09″N 75°06′00″W
- Status: Operational
- Population: 15 (January 2025)
- Opened: 11 January 2002; 24 years ago
- Managed by: United States Navy

The Guantanamo Bay detention camp (Note: Spanish: Centro de detención de la bahía de Guantánamo; Also known as GTMO (/ˈɡɪtmoʊ/ GIT-moh), GITMO (/ˈɡɪtmoʊ/ GIT-moh), or simply Guantanamo Bay.) is a United States military prison within Naval Station Guantanamo Bay (NSGB), on the coast of Guantánamo Bay, Cuba. It was established in 2002 by President George W. Bush to hold terrorism suspects and "illegal enemy combatants" during the war on terror following the September 11 attacks. As of January 2025, at least 780 people from 48 countries have been detained at the camp since its creation, of whom 756 had been released or transferred to other detention facilities, 9 died in custody, and 15 remain.

Following the September 11 attacks, the United States led a multinational military operation against Taliban-ruled Afghanistan to dismantle al-Qaeda and capture its leader, Osama bin Laden. During the invasion, in November 2001, Bush issued a military order allowing the indefinite detention of foreign nationals without charge and preventing them from legally leaving. The U.S. Department of Justice claimed that habeas corpus—a legal recourse against unlawful detention—did not apply to Guantanamo because it was outside U.S. territory; instead, the U.S. has a perpetual lease to occupy and control the 45-square-mile naval base. In January 2002, a temporary detention facility dubbed "Camp X-Ray" was created to house suspected Al-Qaeda members and Taliban fighters. By May 2003, the Guantanamo Bay detention camp had grown into a larger and permanent facility that housed over 680 prisoners, most without formal charges. The Bush administration maintained it was not obliged to grant prisoners protections under the U.S. Constitution or the Geneva Conventions, since the former did not extend to foreign soil and the latter did not apply to "unlawful enemy combatants". Humanitarian and legal advocacy groups claimed these policies were unconstitutional and violated international human rights law; several landmark U.S. Supreme Court decisions found that detainees had rights to due process and habeas corpus but were still subject to military tribunals.

Detainees are reported to have been housed in unfit conditions, abused and tortured, often in the form of "enhanced interrogation techniques". As early as 2003, the International Committee of the Red Cross warned of "deterioration in the psychological health of a large number of detainees". Reports by Amnesty International and Human Rights Watch, as well as intergovernmental institutions such as the Organization of American States and the United Nations, concluded that detainees had been systematically mistreated in violation of their human rights. The detention camp has faced legal, political, and international scrutiny, along with criticism regarding its operations and treatment of detainees. In 2005, Bush acknowledged the facility's necessity but expressed a desire for its eventual closure. His administration began winding down the detainee population, releasing or transferring around 540 detainees by the end of the administration. In 2009, Bush's successor, President Barack Obama, ordered closure of the facility within a year and to identify lawful alternatives for detainees; however, bipartisan opposition from the U.S. Congress, on the grounds of national security, prevented closure. During the Obama administration, the number of inmates was reduced from 250 to 41, but controversial policies such as use of military courts remained. In 2018, President Donald Trump signed an order to keep the detention camp open indefinitely, and only one prisoner was repatriated during his administration. After taking office in 2021, President Joe Biden vowed to close the camp before his term ended, though his administration continued expansions to courtrooms and other facilities. Following the release of 25 detainees, 15 detainees remain as of January 2025; of these, three await transfer, nine have been charged or convicted of war crimes, and three are held in indefinite law of war detention, without facing tribunal charges nor being recommended for release.

In January 2025, Trump signed a memorandum to begin expansion of the Guantanamo Migrant Operations Center to house up to 30,000 migrants under detention, separate from the military prison. The migrant facility will be run by U.S. Immigration and Customs Enforcement (ICE). He signed a memorandum for an unnumbered "additional detention space". In March, the U.S. government transferred an undisclosed number of immigrants from the Guantanamo detention facility to Louisiana. The transfer came as a court reviews the legality of their detention and relocation. The move follows increased scrutiny of U.S. immigration policies, and use of Guantanamo for detaining non-citizens outside of traditional immigration processes.

== History ==
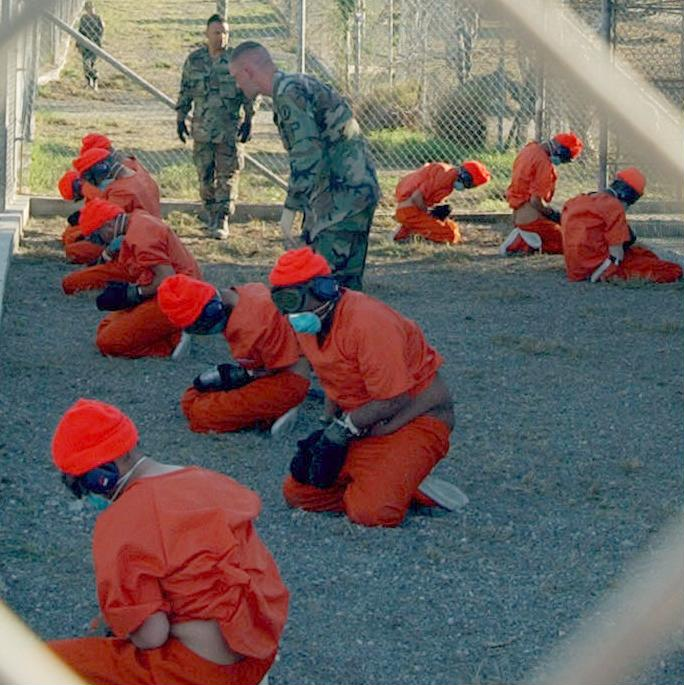
Detainees upon arrival at Camp X-Ray, January 2002

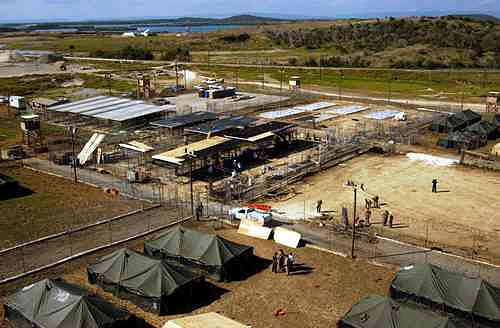
Camp X-Ray, 2002

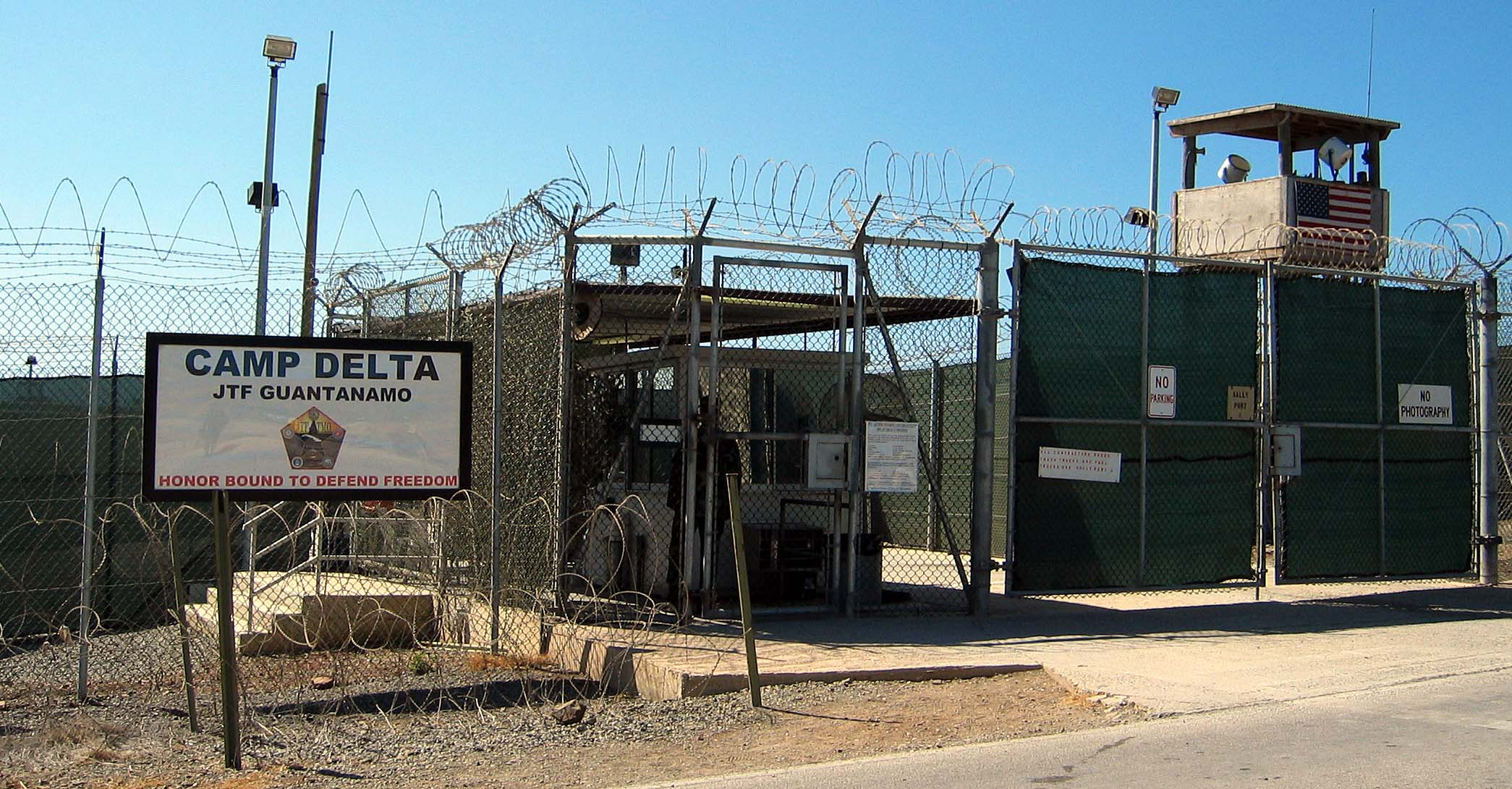
Camp Delta

During the 1898 Spanish–American War, U.S. forces invaded and occupied Cuba amid its war of independence against Spain. In 1901, an American-drafted amendment to the Cuban constitution nominally recognized Cuba's sovereignty while allowing the U.S. to intervene in local affairs and establish naval bases on land leased or purchased from the Cuban government. The Cuban–American Treaty of Relations of 1903 reaffirmed these provisions, and that same year, the Guantánamo Bay Naval Base was established pursuant to a lease agreement with no expiration date. The 1934 Cuban–American Treaty of Relations superseded much of the 1903 treaty but reaffirmed the Guantánamo Bay lease, under which Cuba retains ultimate sovereignty but the U.S. exercises sole jurisdiction. Since coming to power in 1959, Cuba's communist government considers the U.S. military presence at Guantánamo Bay illegal and has repeatedly called for its return. During the Bill Clinton administration and the Haitian refugee crisis, the US Coast Guard collected tens of thousands Haitian refugees to the camp.

The Guantanamo Bay Naval Base, including the detention camp, is operated by the Joint Task Force Guantanamo (JTF-GTMO) of the Southern Command of the Department of Defense (DoD). The main detention compound is Camp Delta, which replaced the temporary Camp X-Ray in April 2002, with other compounds including Camp Echo, Camp Iguana, and the Guantanamo psychiatric ward. The base occupies 45 square miles of land and water.

After political appointees at the U.S. Office of Legal Counsel, Department of Justice advised the George W. Bush administration that "a federal district court could not properly exercise habeas jurisdiction over an alien detained at GBC (Guantanamo Bay, Cuba)", military guards took the first twenty detainees to Camp X-Ray on 11 January 2002. At the time, Secretary of Defense Donald Rumsfeld said the detention camp was established to detain extraordinarily dangerous people, to interrogate detainees in an optimal setting, and to prosecute detainees for war crimes. In practice, the site has long been used for alleged "enemy combatants".

The DoD at first kept secret the identity of the individuals held in Guantanamo, but after losing attempts to defy a Freedom of Information Act request from the Associated Press, the U.S. military officially acknowledged holding 779 prisoners in the camp.

The Bush administration asserted that detainees were not entitled to any of the protections of the Geneva Conventions, while also claiming it was treating "all detainees consistently with the principles of the Geneva Convention." Ensuing U.S. Supreme Court decisions since 2004 have determined otherwise and that U.S. courts do have jurisdiction: it ruled in Hamdan v. Rumsfeld on 29 June 2006, that detainees were entitled to the minimal protections listed under Common Article 3 of the Geneva Conventions. Following this, on 7 July 2006, the Department of Defense issued an internal memo stating that detainees would, in the future, be entitled to protection under Common Article 3.

Current and former detainees have reported abuse and torture, which the Bush administration denied. In a 2005 Amnesty International report, the facility was called the "Gulag of our times". In 2006, the United Nations unsuccessfully demanded that Guantanamo Bay detention camp be closed. On 13 January 2009, Susan J. Crawford, appointed by Bush to review DoD practices used at Guantanamo Bay and oversee the military trials, became the first Bush administration official to concede that torture occurred at Guantanamo Bay on one detainee (Mohammed al-Qahtani), saying "We tortured Qahtani."

On 22 January 2009, President Obama issued a request to suspend proceedings at Guantanamo military commission for 120 days and to shut down the detention facility that year. On 29 January 2009, a military judge at Guantanamo rejected the White House request in the case of Abd al-Rahim al-Nashiri, creating an unexpected challenge for the administration as it reviewed how the United States brings Guantanamo detainees to trial. On 20 May 2009, the United States Senate passed an amendment to the Supplemental Appropriations Act of 2009 (H.R. 2346) by a 90–6 vote to block funds needed for the transfer or release of prisoners held at the Guantanamo Bay detention camp. President Obama issued a presidential memorandum dated 15 December 2009, ordering Thomson Correctional Center, Thomson, Illinois, to be prepared to accept transferred Guantanamo prisoners.

The Final Report of the Guantanamo Review Task Force, dated 22 January 2010, published the results for the 240 detainees subject to the review: 36 were the subject of active cases or investigations; 30 detainees from Yemen were designated for "conditional detention" due to the poor security environment in Yemen; 126 detainees were approved for transfer; 48 detainees were determined "too dangerous to transfer but not feasible for prosecution".

On 6 January 2011, President Obama signed the 2011 Defense Authorization Bill, which, in part, placed restrictions on the transfer of Guantanamo prisoners to the mainland or to foreign countries, thus impeding the closure of the facility. In February 2011, U.S. Secretary of Defense Robert Gates said that Guantanamo Bay was unlikely to be closed, due to opposition in the Congress. Congress particularly opposed moving prisoners to facilities in the United States for detention or trial. In April 2011, WikiLeaks began publishing 779 secret files relating to prisoners in the Guantanamo Bay detention camp.

On 4 November 2015, President Barack Obama stated that he was preparing to unveil a plan to close the facility and move some of the terrorism suspects held there to U.S. soil. The plan would propose one or more prisons from a working list that includes facilities in Kansas, Colorado and South Carolina. Two others that were on the list, in California and Washington State, do not appear to have made the preliminary cut, according to a senior administration official familiar with the proposal. By the end of the Obama Administration on 19 January 2017, however, the detention center remained open, with 41 detainees remaining.

In June 2022, The New York Times publicly released photographs of the first camp detainees following a Freedom of Information Act (FOIA) request.

=== Post-Bush statements ===
In 2010, Colonel Lawrence Wilkerson, a former aide to Secretary of State Colin Powell, stated in an affidavit that top U.S. officials, including President George W. Bush, Vice President Dick Cheney, and Secretary of Defense Donald Rumsfeld, had known that the majority of the detainees initially sent to Guantánamo were innocent, but that the detainees had been kept there for reasons of political expedience. Wilkerson's statement was submitted in connection with a lawsuit filed in federal district court by former detainee Adel Hassan Hamad against the United States government and several individual officials. This supported numerous claims made by former detainees such as Moazzam Begg, a British citizen who had been held for three years in detention camps in Afghanistan and Guantanamo as an enemy combatant, under the claim that he was an al-Qaeda member who recruited for, and provided money for, al-Qaeda training camps and himself trained there to fight US or allied troops.

== Camp facilities ==
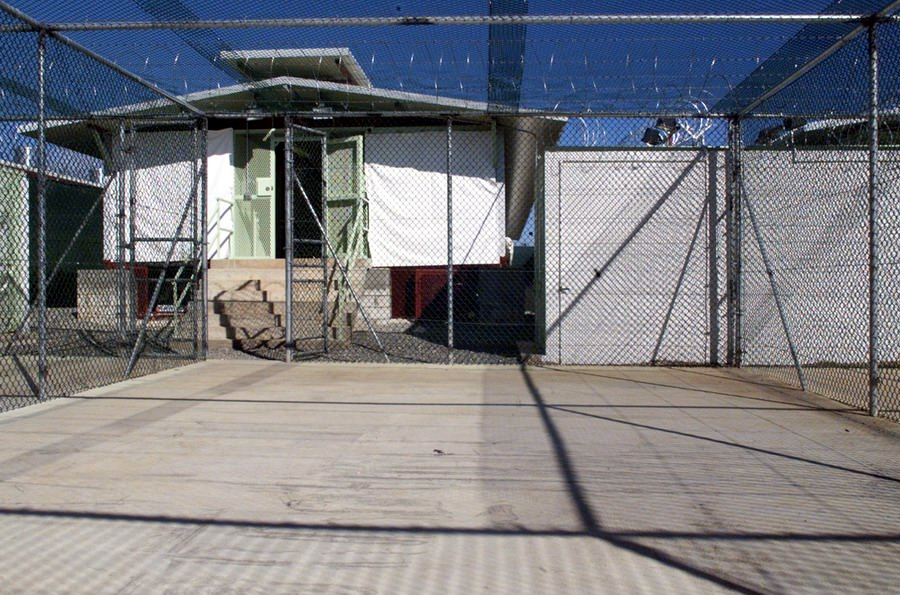
A Camp Delta recreation and exercise area in Guantánamo Bay, Cuba. The detention block is shown with sunshades drawn on 3 December 2002.

Camp Delta was a 612-unit detention center finished in April 2002. It included detention camps 1 through 4, as well as Camp Echo, where detainees not facing military commissions are held.

Camp X-Ray was a temporary detention facility, which was closed in April 2002. Its prisoners were transferred to Camp Delta.

In 2008, the Associated Press reported Camp 7, a separate facility on the naval base that was considered the highest security jail on the base. That facility held detainees previously imprisoned in a global, clandestine network of CIA prisons. An attorney first visited a detainee at Camp 7 in 2013. The precise location of Camp 7 has never been confirmed. In early April 2021, Camp 7 was shut down due to deteriorating conditions of the facilities. The remaining prisoners at Camp 7 were transferred to Camp 5.

Camp 5, as well as Camp 6, were built in 2003–04. They are modeled after a high-security facility in Indiana. In September 2016, Camp 5 was closed and a portion of it dedicated to use as a medical facility for detainees. A portion of Camp 5 was again re-dedicated in early April 2021, when Camp 7 so-called "high value" former CIA detainees were moved there. In Camp 6, the U.S. government detains those who are not convicted in military commissions.

In January 2010, Scott Horton published an article in Harper's Magazine describing "Camp No", a black site about 1 mile (1.6 km) outside the main camp perimeter, which included an interrogation center. His description was based on accounts by four guards who had served at Guantanamo. They said prisoners were taken one at a time to the camp, where they were believed to be interrogated. He believes that the three detainees that DoD announced as having committed suicide were questioned under torture the night of their deaths.

From 2003 to 2006, the CIA operated a small site, known informally as "Penny Lane", to house prisoners whom the agency attempted to recruit as spies against Al-Qaeda. The housing at Penny Lane was less sparse by the standards of Guantanamo Bay, with private kitchens, showers, televisions, and beds with mattresses. The camp was divided into eight units. Its existence was revealed to the Associated Press in 2013.

== Camp conditions and testimonies of abuse and torture ==
A 2013 Institute on Medicine as a Profession (IMAP) report concluded that health professionals working with the military and intelligence services "designed and participated in cruel, inhumane and degrading treatment and torture of detainees." Medical professionals were ordered to ignore ethical standards during involvement in abusive interrogation, including monitoring of vital signs under stress-inducing procedures. They used medical information for interrogation purposes and participated in force-feeding of hunger strikers, in violation of World Medical Association and American Medical Association prohibitions.

Supporters of controversial techniques have declared that certain protections of the Third Geneva Convention do not apply to Al-Qaeda or Taliban fighters, claiming that the Convention applies to only military personnel and guerrillas who are part of a chain of command, wear distinctive insignia, bear arms openly, and abide by the rules of war. Jim Phillips of The Heritage Foundation said that "some of these terrorists who are not recognized as soldiers don't deserve to be treated as soldiers." Critics of U.S. policy, such as George Monbiot, claimed the government had violated the Conventions in attempting to create a distinction between "prisoners of war" and "illegal combatants". Amnesty International called the situation "a human rights scandal" in a series of reports.

One of the allegations of abuse at the camp is the abuse of the religion of the detainees. Prisoners released from the camp have alleged incidents of abuse of religion including flushing the Quran down the toilet, defacing the Quran, writing comments and remarks on the Quran, tearing pages out of the Quran, and denying detainees a copy of the Quran. One of the justifications offered for the continued detention of Mesut Sen, during his Administrative Review Board hearing, was:

Emerging as a leader, the detainee has been leading the detainees around him in prayer. The detainees listen to him speak and follow his actions during prayer.

Red Cross inspectors and released detainees have alleged acts of torture, including sleep deprivation, beatings and locking in confined and cold cells.

The use of Guantánamo Bay as a military prison has been the subject of significant criticism, particularly from human rights organizations, which cite reports of torture and poor treatment of detainees. Supporters of the facility argue that enemy combatants can be lawfully detained until hostilities cease and that providing trial review for such detentions has not been a historical practice for prisoners of war.

=== Testimonies of treatment ===
Interview with Ruhal Ahmed by Laura Poitras in 2010

Three British Muslim prisoners, known in the media at the time as the "Tipton Three", were repatriated to the United Kingdom in March 2004, where officials immediately released them without charge. The three alleged ongoing torture, sexual degradation, forced drugging, and religious persecution being committed by U.S. forces at Guantánamo Bay. The former Guantanamo detainee Mehdi Ghezali was freed without charge on 9 July 2004, after two and a half years internment. Ghezali claimed that he was the victim of repeated torture. Omar Deghayes alleged he was blinded after his right eye was gouged by an officer. Juma Al Dossary claimed he was interrogated hundreds of times, beaten, tortured with broken glass, barbed wire, burning cigarettes, and suffered sexual assaults. David Hicks also made allegations of torture and mistreatment in Guantanamo Bay, including sensory deprivation, stress positions, having his head slammed into concrete, repeated anal penetration, routine sleep deprivation and forced drug injections.

An Associated Press report claimed that some detainees were turned over to the U.S. by Afghan tribesmen in return for cash bounties. The first Denbeaux study, published by Seton Hall University Law School, reproduced copies of several leaflets, flyers, and posters the U.S. government distributed to advertise the bounty program; some of which offered bounties of "millions of dollars".

Hunger-striking detainees claimed that guards were force feeding them in the fall of 2005: "Detainees said large feeding tubes were forcibly shoved up their noses and down into their stomachs, with guards using the same tubes from one patient to another. The detainees say no sedatives were provided during these procedures, which they allege took place in front of U.S. physicians, including the head of the prison hospital. "A hunger striking detainee at Guantánamo Bay wants a judge to order the removal of his feeding tube so he can be allowed to die", one of his lawyers has said. Within a few weeks, the Department of Defense "extended an invitation to United Nations Special Rapporteurs to visit detention facilities at Guantanamo Bay Naval Station." This was rejected by the U.N. because of DoD restrictions, stating that "[the] three human rights officials invited to Guantánamo Bay wouldn't be allowed to conduct private interviews" with prisoners. Simultaneously, media reports began related to the question of prisoner treatment. District Court Judge Gladys Kessler also ordered the U.S. government to release medical records going back a week before such feedings took place. In early November 2005, the U.S. suddenly accelerated, for unknown reasons, the rate of prisoner release, but this was not sustained. Detainee Mansur Ahmad Saad al-Dayfi has alleged that Ron DeSantis oversaw force-feedings of detainees during his time as a JAG officer in Guantanamo.

In May 2013, detainees undertook a widespread hunger strike; they were subsequently being force fed until the U.S. Government stopped releasing hunger strike information, due to it having "no operational purpose". During the month of Ramadan that year, the US military claimed that the amount of detainees on hunger strike had dropped from 106 to 81. However, according to defense attorney Clive Stafford Smith, "The military are cheating on the numbers as usual. Some detainees are taking a token amount of food as part of the traditional breaking of the fast at the end of each day in Ramadan, so that is now conveniently allowing them to be counted as not striking." In 2014, the Obama administration undertook a "rebranding effort" by referring to the hunger strikes as "long term non-religious fasting".

Attorney Alka Pradhan petitioned a military judge to order the release of art made in her client, Ammar al-Baluchi's cell. She complained that painting and drawing was made difficult, and he was not permitted to give artwork to his counsel.

It has been reported that prisoners cooperating with interrogations have been rewarded with Happy Meals from the McDonald's on base.

=== Reported suicides ===
By May 2011, there had been at least six reported suicides in Guantánamo.

During August 2003, there were 23 suicide attempts. The U.S. officials did not say why they had not previously reported the incident. After this event, the Pentagon reclassified alleged suicide attempts as "manipulative self-injurious behaviors". Camp physicians alleged that detainees do not genuinely wish to end their lives, rather, the prisoners supposedly feel that they may be able to get better treatment or release with suicide attempts. Daryl Matthews, a professor of forensic psychiatry at the University of Hawaii who examined the prisoners, stated that given the cultural differences between interrogators and prisoners, "intent" was difficult if not impossible to ascertain. Clinical depression is common in Guantánamo, with 1/5 of all prisoners being prescribed antidepressants such as Prozac. Guantanamo Bay officials have reported 41 suicide attempts by 25 detainees since the U.S. began taking prisoners to the base in January 2002. Defense lawyers contend the number of suicide attempts is higher.

On 10 June 2006 three detainees were found dead, who, according to the DoD, "killed themselves in an apparent suicide pact." Prison commander Rear Admiral Harry Harris claimed this was not an act of desperation, despite prisoners' pleas to the contrary, but rather "an act of asymmetric warfare committed against us." The three detainees were said to have hanged themselves with nooses made of sheets and clothes. According to military officials, the suicides were coordinated acts of protests.

Human rights activists and defense attorneys said the deaths signaled the desperation of many of the detainees. Barbara Olshansky of the Center for Constitutional Rights, which represented about 300 Guantánamo detainees, said that detainees "have this incredible level of despair that they will never get justice." At the time, human rights groups called for an independent public inquiry into the deaths. Amnesty International said the apparent suicides "are the tragic results of years of arbitrary and indefinite detention" and called the prison "an indictment" of the George W. Bush administration's human rights record. Saudi Arabia's state-sponsored Saudi Human Rights group blamed the U.S. for the deaths. "There are no independent monitors at the detention camp so it is easy to pin the crime on the prisoners... it's possible they were tortured," said Mufleh al-Qahtani, the group's deputy director, in a statement to the local Al-Riyadh newspaper.

Highly disturbed about the deaths of its citizens under U.S. custody, the Saudi government pressed the United States to release its citizens into its custody. From June 2006 through 2007, the U.S. released 93 detainees (of an original 133 Saudis detained) to the Saudi Arabian government. The Saudi government developed a re-integration program including religious education, helping to arrange marriages and jobs, to bring detainees back into society.

The Center for Policy and Research published Death in Camp Delta (2009), its analysis of the NCIS report, noting many inconsistencies in the government account and said the conclusion of suicide by hanging in their cells was not supported. It suggested that camp administration officials had either been grossly negligent or were participating in a cover-up of the deaths.

In January 2010 Scott Horton published an article in Harper's Magazine disputing the government's findings and suggesting the three died of accidental manslaughter following torture. His account was based on the testimony of four members of the Military Intelligence unit assigned to guard Camp Delta, including a decorated non-commissioned Army officer who was on duty as sergeant of the guard the night of 9–10 June 2006. Their account contradicts the report published by the Naval Criminal Investigative Service (NCIS). Horton said the deaths had occurred at a black site, known as "Camp No", outside the perimeter of the camp. According to its spokeswoman Laura Sweeney, the Department of Justice has disputed certain facts contained in the article about the soldiers' account.

=== Torture ===
The International Committee of the Red Cross (ICRC) inspected some of the prison facilities in June 2004. In a confidential report issued in July 2004 and leaked to the New York Times in November 2004, Red Cross inspectors accused the U.S. military of using "humiliating acts, solitary confinement, temperature extremes, and use of forced positions" against prisoners. The inspectors concluded that "the construction of such a system, whose stated purpose is the production of intelligence, cannot be considered other than an intentional system of cruel, unusual and degrading treatment and a form of torture." The United States government reportedly rejected the Red Cross findings at the time.

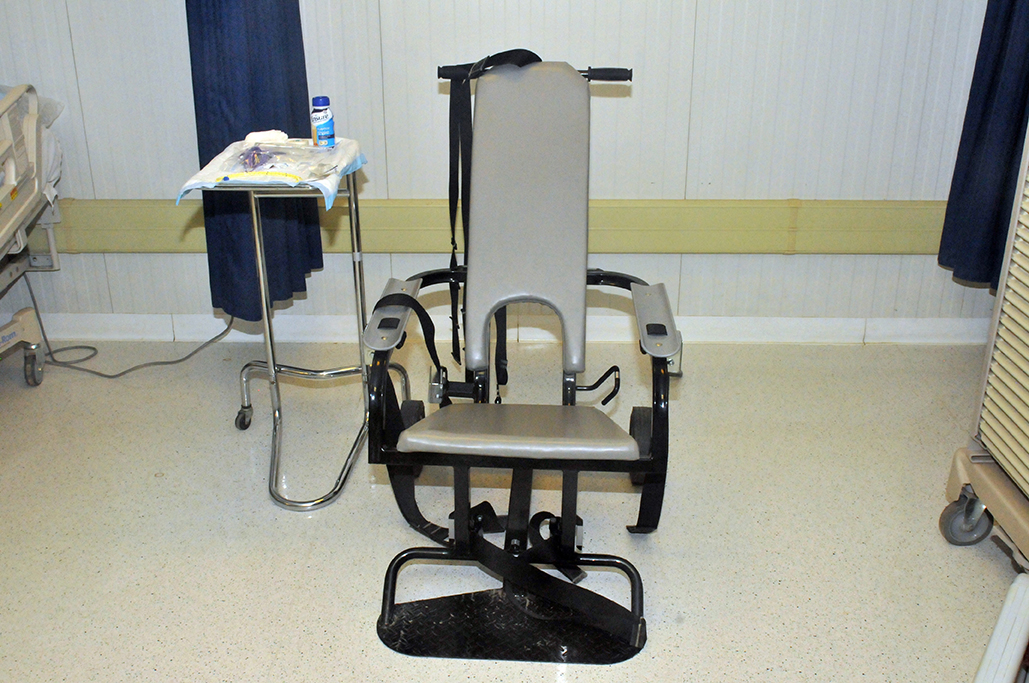
Force feeding restraint chair in Guantanamo (2013)

On 30 November 2004, the New York Times published excerpts from an internal memo leaked from the U.S. administration, referring to a report from the ICRC. The ICRC reports of several activities that, it said, were "tantamount to torture": exposure to loud noise or music, prolonged extreme temperatures, or beatings. It also reported that a Behavioral Science Consultation Team (BSCT), also called 'Biscuit,' and military physicians communicated confidential medical information to the interrogation teams (weaknesses, phobias, etc.), resulting in the prisoners losing confidence in their medical care.

The ICRC's access to the base was conditioned, as is normal for ICRC humanitarian operations, on the confidentiality of their report. Following leaking of the U.S. memo, some in the ICRC wanted to make their report public or confront the U.S. administration. The newspaper said the administration and the Pentagon had seen the ICRC report in July 2004 but rejected its findings. The story was originally reported in several newspapers, including The Guardian, and the ICRC reacted to the article when the report was leaked in May.

According to a 21 June 2005 New York Times opinion article, on 29 July 2004, an FBI agent was quoted as saying, "On a couple of occasions, I entered interview rooms to find a detainee chained hand and foot in a fetal position to the floor, with no chair, food or water. Most times, they had urinated or defecated on themselves and had been left there for 18, 24 hours or more." Air Force Lt. Gen. Randall Schmidt, who headed the probe into FBI accounts of abuse of Guantánamo prisoners by Defense Department personnel, concluded the man (Mohammed al-Qahtani, a Saudi, described as the "20th hijacker") was subjected to "abusive and degrading treatment" by "the cumulative effect of creative, persistent and lengthy interrogations." The techniques used were authorized by the Pentagon, he said.

Many of the released prisoners have complained of enduring beatings, sleep deprivation, prolonged constraint in uncomfortable positions, prolonged hooding, cultural and sexual humiliation, enemas as well as other forced injections, and other physical and psychological mistreatment during their detention in Camp Delta.

In 2004, Army Specialist Sean Baker, a soldier posing as a prisoner during training exercises at the camp, was beaten so severely that he suffered a brain injury and seizures. In June 2004, The New York Times reported that of the nearly 600 detainees, not more than two dozen were closely linked to al-Qaeda and that only very limited information could have been received from questionings. In 2006, the only top terrorist was reportedly Mohammed al Qahtani from Saudi Arabia, who is believed to have planned to participate in the September 11 attacks in 2001.

Mohammed al-Qahtani was refused entry at Orlando International Airport, which stopped him from his plan to take part in the 9/11 attacks. During his Guantánamo interrogations, he was given 3 1/2 bags of intravenous fluid, and then forbidden to use the toilet, forcing him to soil himself. Accounts of the type of treatment he received include: having water poured over him, interrogations starting at midnight and lasting 12 hours, psychological torture methods such as sleep deprivation via repeatedly being woken up by loud, raucous music whenever he would fall asleep, and military dogs being used to intimidate him. Soldiers would play the American national anthem and force him to salute, he had images of victims of the September 11 attacks affixed to his body, he was forced to bark like a dog, and his beard and hair were shaved, an insult to Muslim men. He would be humiliated and upset by female personnel, was forced to wear a bra, and was stripped nude and had fake menstrual blood smeared on him, while being made to believe it was real. Some of the abuses were documented in 2005, when the Interrogation Log of al-Qathani "Detainee 063" was partially published.

The Washington Post, in an 8 May 2004 article, described a set of interrogation techniques approved for use in interrogating alleged terrorists at Guantánamo Bay. Kenneth Roth, executive director of Human Rights Watch, characterized them as cruel and inhumane treatment illegal under the U.S. Constitution. On 15 June, Brigadier General Janis Karpinski, commander at Abu Ghraib prison in Iraq during the prisoner abuse scandal, said she was told from the top to treat detainees like dogs "as it is done in Guantánamo [Camp Delta]." The former commander of Camp X-Ray, Geoffrey Miller, had led the inquiry into the alleged abuses at Abu Ghraib during the Allied occupation. Ex-detainees of the Guantanamo Camp have made serious allegations, including alleging Geoffrey Miller's complicity in abuse at Camp X-Ray.

In "Whose God Rules?" David McColgin, a defense attorney for Guantanamo detainees, recounts how a female government interrogator told Muslim detainees she was menstruating, "slipped her hand into her pants and pulled it out with a red liquid smeared on it meant to look like menstrual blood. The detainee screamed at the top of his lungs, began shaking, sobbing, and yanked his arms against his handcuffs. The interrogator explained to [the detainee] that he would now feel too dirty to pray and that she would have the guards turn off the water in his cell so he would not be able to wash the red substance off. 'What do you think your brothers will think of you in the morning when they see an American woman's menstrual blood on your face?' she said as she left the cell." These acts, as well as interrogators desecrating the Quran, led the detainees to riots and mass suicide attempts.

The BBC published a leaked FBI email from December 2003, which said that the Defense Department interrogators at Guantánamo had impersonated FBI agents while using "torture techniques" on a detainee.

In an interview with CNN's Wolf Blitzer in June 2005, Vice President Dick Cheney defended the treatment of prisoners at Guantánamo:

There isn't any other nation in the world that would treat people who were determined to kill Americans the way we're treating these people. They're living in the tropics. They're well fed. They've got everything they could possibly want.

The United States government, through the State Department, makes Periodic Reports to the United Nations Committee Against Torture as part of its treaty obligations under the U.N. Convention Against Torture. In October 2005, the U.S. report covered pretrial detention of suspects in the "war on terrorism", including those held in Guantánamo Bay. This Periodic Report is significant as the first official response of the U.S. government to allegations that prisoners are mistreated in Guantánamo Bay. While the 2005 report denies allegations of "serious abuse", it does detail 10 "substantiated incidents of misconduct", and the training and punishments given to the perpetrators.

Writing in the New York Times on 24 June 2012, former President Jimmy Carter criticized the methods used to obtain confessions:

"Some of the few being tried (only in military courts) have been tortured by waterboarding more than 100 times or intimidated with semiautomatic weapons, power drills or threats to sexually assault their mothers. These facts cannot be used as a defense by the accused, because the government claims they occurred under the cover of 'national security'".

=== Sexual abuse ===
In 2005, it was reported that sexual methods were allegedly used by interrogators to break Muslim prisoners. In a 2015 article from The Guardian, it was claimed that the CIA used sexual abuse along with a wider array of other forms of torture. Detainee Majid Khan testified that interrogators "poured ice water on his genitals, twice videotaped him naked and repeatedly touched his private parts", according to the same article.

== Operating procedures ==
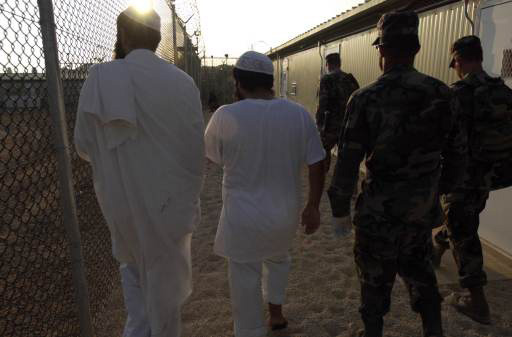
Detainees are shown to their new living quarters (image taken and released by the U.S. military).

A manual called "Camp Delta Standard Operating Procedure" (SOP), dated 28 February 2003, and designated "Unclassified//For Official Use Only", was published on WikiLeaks. This is the main document for the operation of Guantánamo Bay, including the securing and treatment of detainees. The 238-page document includes procedures for identity cards and 'Muslim burial'. It is signed by Major General Geoffrey D. Miller. The document is the subject of an ongoing legal action by the American Civil Liberties Union (ACLU), which has been trying to obtain it from the Department of Defense.

On 2 July 2008, the New York Times revealed that the U.S. military trainers who came to Guantánamo Bay in December 2002 had based an interrogation class on a chart copied directly from a 1957 Air Force study of Chinese Communist interrogation methodology (subsequently referred to as "brainwashing") that the United States alleged were used during the Korean War to obtain confessions. The chart showed the effects of "coercive management techniques" for possible use on prisoners, including "sleep deprivation", "prolonged constraint" (also known as "stress positions") and "exposure". The chart was copied from a 1957 article (entitled "Communist Attempts to Elicit False Confessions From Air Force Prisoners of War") written by Albert D. Biderman, a sociologist working for the Air Force. Biderman had interviewed American prisoners of war returning from Korea who had confessed to having taken part in biological warfare or involvement in other atrocities. His article sets out that the most common interrogation method used by the Chinese was to indirectly subject a prisoner to extended periods of what would initially be minor discomfort. As an example, prisoners would be required to stand for extended periods, sometimes in a cold environment. Prolonged standing and exposure to cold are an accepted technique used by the American military and the CIA to interrogate prisoners whom the United States classifies as "unlawful combatants" (spies and saboteurs in wartime; "terrorists" in unconventional conflicts) although it is classified as torture under the Geneva Conventions. The chart reflects an "extreme model" created by Biderman to help in "understanding what occurred apart from the extent to which it was realized in actuality". His chart sets out in summary bullet points the techniques allegedly used by the Chinese in Korea, the most extreme of which include "Semi-Starvation", "Exploitation of Wounds", and use of "Filthy, Infested Surroundings" to make the prisoner "Dependent on Interrogator", to weaken "Mental and Physical Ability to Resist", and to reduce the "Prisoner to 'Animal Level'".

It should be understood that only a few of the Air Force personnel who encountered efforts to elicit false confessions in Korea were subjected to really full dress, all-out attempts to make them behave in the manner I have sketched. The time between capture and repatriation for many was too short, and, presumably, the trained interrogators available to the Communists too few, to permit this. Of the few Air Force prisoners who did get the full treatment, none could be made to behave in complete accordance with the Chinese Communists' ideal of the "repentant criminal".

The article was motivated by the need for the United States to deal with prominent confessions of war crimes obtained by Chinese interrogators during the Korean War. The report led the American military to develop a training program to counter the use of such methods used by an enemy interrogator. Almost all U.S. military personnel now receive Survival, Evasion, Resistance and Escape (SERE) training to resist interrogation. Central to this training program are the interrogation methods presented by Biderman. In 2002, this training program was adopted as a source of interrogation techniques to be used in the newly declared "war on terror". When it was adopted for use at the Guantánamo detention and interrogation facility the only change that was made to Biderman's Chart was to change the title (originally called "Communist Coercive Methods for Eliciting Individual Compliance"). The training document was made public at a United States Senate Armed Services Committee hearing (17 June 2008) investigating how such tactics came to be employed. Col. Steven Kleinman, who was head of a team of SERE trainers, testified that his team had been put under pressure to demonstrate the techniques on Iraqi prisoners and that they had been sent home after Kleinman had observed that the techniques were intended to be used as a "form of punishment for those who wouldn't cooperate", and put a stop to it. Sen. Carl Levin (chairman of the Senate Armed Services Committee) was quoted after reviewing the evidence as saying:

What makes this document doubly stunning is that these were techniques to get false confessions. People say we need intelligence, and we do. But we don't need false intelligence.

== Camp detainees ==
Since January 2002, 779 men have been brought to Guantanamo. Nearly 200 were released by mid-2004, before there had been any CSRTs (Combatant Status Review Tribunal) to review whether individuals were rightfully held as enemy combatants. Of all detainees at Guantanamo, Afghans were the largest group (29 percent), followed by Saudi Arabians (17 percent), Yemenis (15 percent), Pakistanis (9 percent), and Algerians (3 percent). Overall, 50 nationalities were present at Guantanamo.

Although the Bush administration said most of the men had been captured fighting in Afghanistan, a 2006 report prepared by the Center for Policy and Research at Seton Hall University Law School reviewed DoD data for the remaining 517 men in 2005 and "established that over 80% of the prisoners were captured not by Americans on the battlefield but by Pakistanis and Afghans, often in exchange for bounty payments." The U.S. widely distributed leaflets in the region and offered $5,000 per prisoner. One example is Adel Noori, a Chinese Uyghur and dissident who had been sold to the US by Pakistani bounty hunters.

Top DoD officials often referred to these prisoners as the "worst of the worst", but a 2003 memo by then-Secretary of Defense Donald Rumsfeld said "We need to stop populating Guantanamo Bay (GTMO) with low-level enemy combatants... GTMO needs to serve as an [redacted] not a prison for Afghanistan." The Center for Policy and Research's 2006 report, based on DoD released data, found that most detainees were low-level offenders who were not affiliated with organizations on U.S. terrorist lists.

Eight men have died in the prison camp; DoD has said that six were suicides. DoD reported that three men, two Saudis and a Yemeni, had committed suicide on 10 June 2006. Government accounts, including an NCIS report released with redactions in August 2008, have been questioned by the press, the detainees' families, the Saudi government, former detainees, and human rights groups.

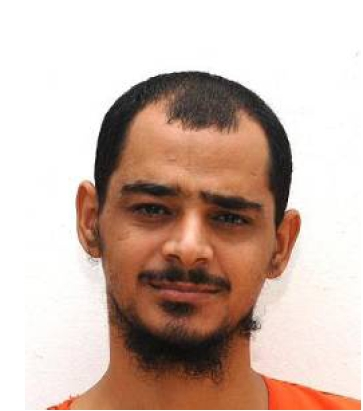
Adnan Farhan Abd Al Latif, one of the eight detainees who died in the prison camp

An estimated 17 to 22 minors under the age of 18 and 3 under the age of 16 were detained at Guantánamo Bay, and it has been claimed that this is in violation of international law. According to Chaplain Kent Svendsen who served as chaplain for the detention centers from 2004 to 2005 there were no minor detainees at the site upon starting his assignment in early 2004. He said: "I was given a tour of the camp and it was explained to me that minors were segregated from the general public and processed to be returned to their families. The camp had long been emptied and closed when I arrived at my duty station".

In July 2005, 242 detainees were moved out of Guantanamo, including 173 who were released without charge. Sixty-nine prisoners were transferred to the custody of governments of other countries, according to the DoD.

The Center for Constitutional Rights has prepared biographies of some of the prisoners currently being held in Guantanamo Prison.

By May 2011, 600 detainees had been released. Most of the men were released without charges or transferred to facilities in their home countries. According to former U.S. president Jimmy Carter, about half were cleared for release, yet had little prospect of ever obtaining their freedom.

As of June 2013, 46 detainees (in addition to two who were deceased) were designated to be detained indefinitely, because the government said the prisoners were too dangerous to transfer and there was insufficient admissible evidence to try them.

After the release of Saifullah Paracha in October 2022, 35 prisoners remained, 20 of which had been cleared for release, pending identification of a suitable country.

As of 20 April 2023, 30 detainees remained at Guantanamo Bay.

The fates of former detainees after their release from Guantanamo are mixed. Many have attempted to reintegrate into normal life in their home countries. Some have sought and won refugee status away from their home country, such as Maasoum Abdah Mouhammad and Ahmed Abdul Qader. Some re-engaged in "terror-related activities" since their release, such as Ibrahim al Qosi. Others were incarcerated in their home countries after having been returned, such as Yunis Abdurrahman Shokuri and Aziz Abdul Naji.

=== High-value prisoners ===
In September 2006, President Bush announced that 14 "high-value detainees" were to be transferred to military custody of the Guantánamo Bay detention camp from civilian custody by the CIA. He admitted that these suspects had been held in CIA secret prisons overseas, known as black sites. These people include Khalid Sheikh Mohammed, believed to be the No. 3 Al-Qaeda leader before he was captured in Pakistan in 2003; Ramzi bin al-Shibh, an alleged would-be 9/11 hijacker; and Abu Zubaydah, who was believed to be a link between Osama bin Laden and many Al-Qaeda cells, who were captured in Pakistan in March 2002.

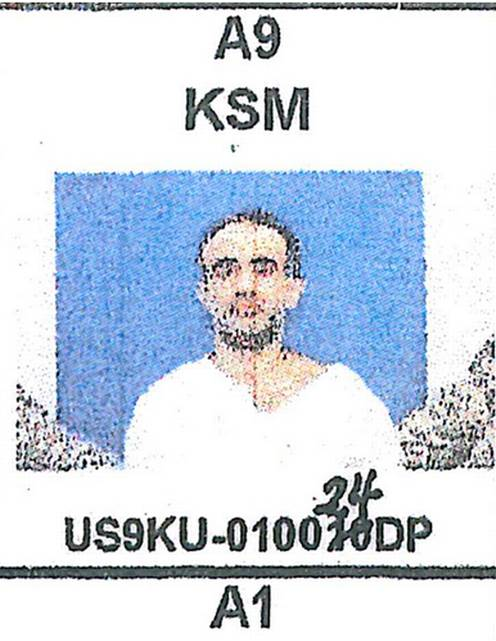
Khalid Sheikh Mohammed

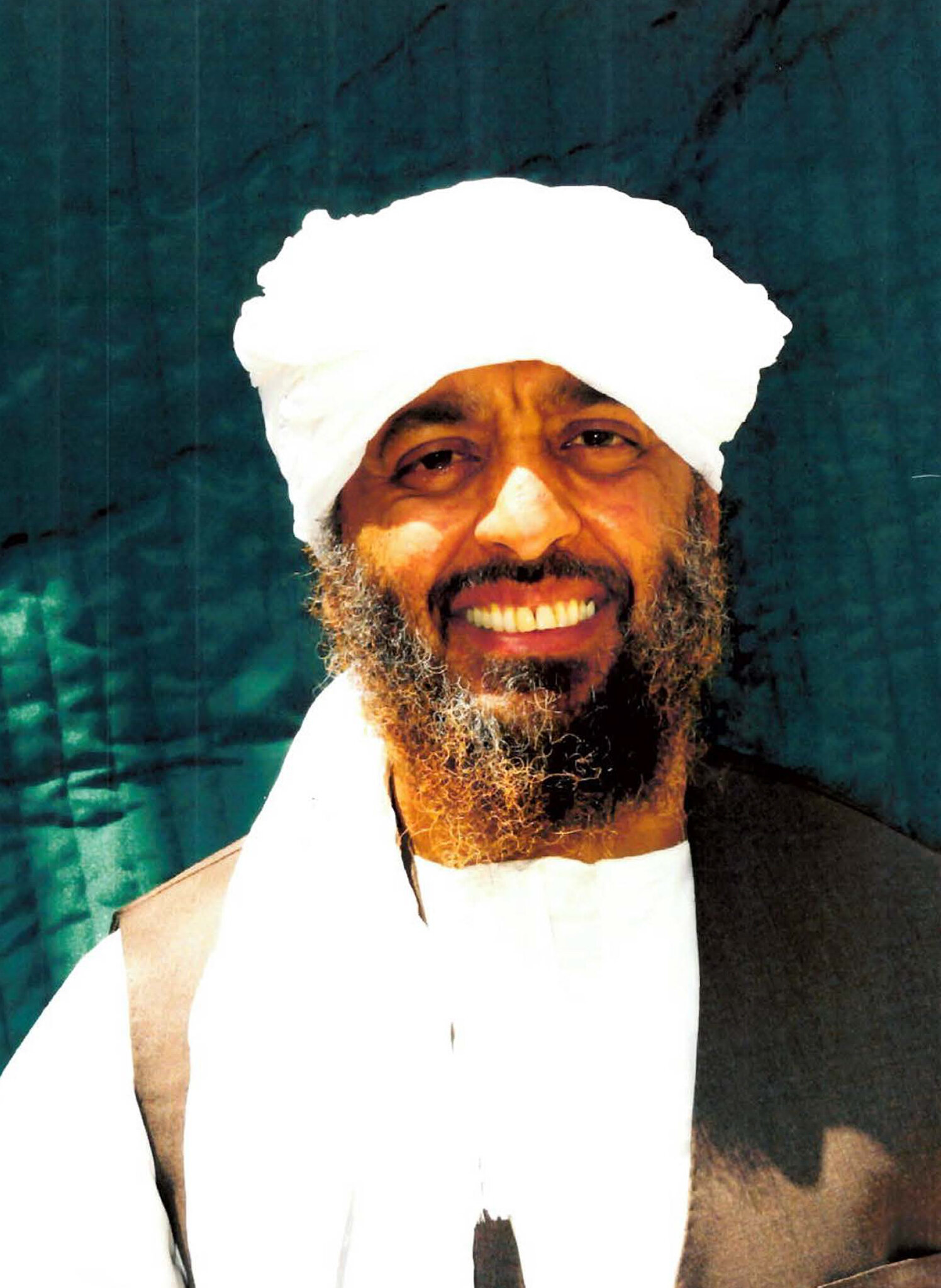
Ramzi bin al-Shibh

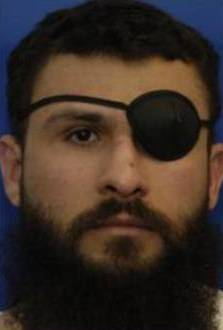
Abu Zubaydah
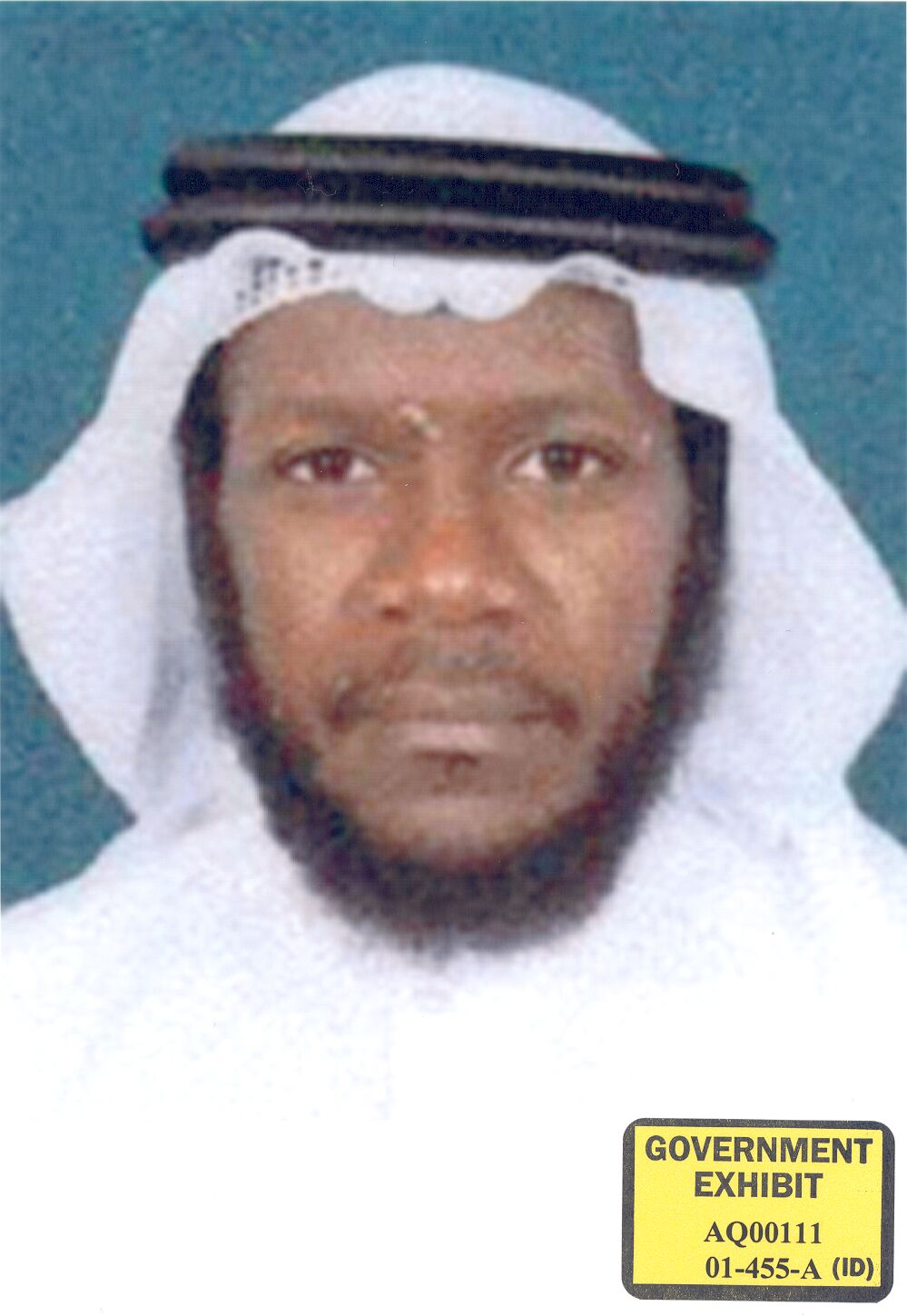
Mustafa al-Hawsawi

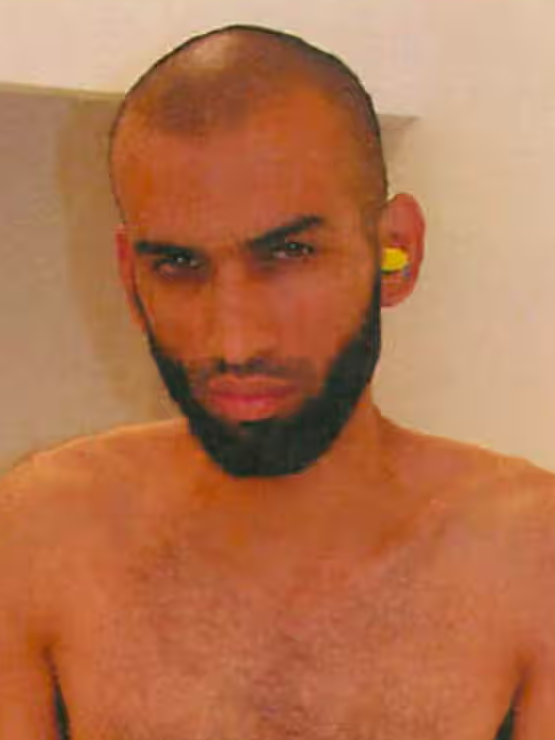
Ammar al-Baluchi

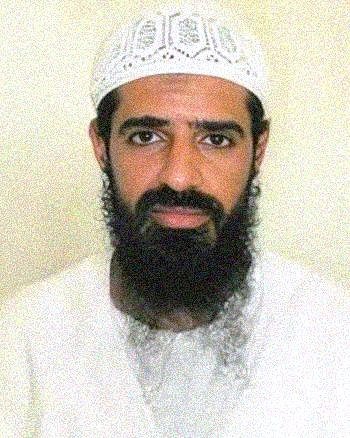
Walid bin Attash

In 2011, human rights groups and journalists found that some of these prisoners had been taken to other locations, including in Europe, and interrogated under torture in the U.S. extraordinary rendition program before arriving at Guantanamo.

On 11 February 2008, the U.S. military charged Khalid Sheikh Mohammed, Ramzi bin al-Shibh, Mustafa Ahmad al-Hawsawi, Ali Abd Al-Aziz Ali and Walid bin Attash with committing the September 11 attacks, under the military commission system, as established under the Military Commissions Act of 2006 (MCA). In Boumediene v. Bush (2008), the U.S. Supreme Court ruled that the MCA was unconstitutional.

On 5 February 2009, charges against Abd al-Rahim al-Nashiri were dropped without prejudice after an order by Obama to suspend trials for 120 days. Abd Al-Rahim Al-Nashiri was accused of renting a small boat connected with the USS Cole bombing.

On 31 July 2024, Mohammed, Attash, and al-Hawsawi all agreed to plead guilty to avoid the death penalty. In exchange, they will be given life sentences and be transferred from Guantanamo Bay to ADX Florence. The plea deal was revoked by Secretary of Defense Lloyd Austin two days later. The plea deals were reinstated in November 2024, since the defense secretary did not have the required authority to revoke them and furthermore acted too late according to a military judge. Once the three inmates are transferred, this will reduce the remaining number of detainees to 27, slowly edging towards closing the base.

However, in July 2025 the plea deals were voided by a D.C. appeals court in a 2–1 ruling.

== Government and military inquiries ==
The US Senate Report on CIA Detention Interrogation Program that details the use of torture during CIA detention and interrogation

Senior law enforcement agents with the Criminal Investigation Task Force told MSNBC in 2006 that they began to complain inside the Defense Department in 2002 that the interrogation tactics used by a separate team of intelligence investigators were unproductive, not likely to produce reliable information and probably illegal. Unable to get satisfaction from the Army commanders running the detainee camp, they took their concerns to David Brant, director of the NCIS, who alerted Navy General Counsel Alberto J. Mora.

General Counsel Mora and Navy Judge Advocate General Michael Lohr believed the detainee treatment to be unlawful and campaigned among other top lawyers and officials in the Defense Department to investigate, and to provide clear standards prohibiting coercive interrogation tactics.

In response, on 15 January 2003, Donald Rumsfeld suspended the approved interrogation tactics at Guantánamo until a new set of guidelines could be produced by a working group headed by General Counsel of the Air Force Mary Walker. The working group based its new guidelines on a legal memo from the Department of Justice Office of Legal Counsel written by John Yoo and signed by Jay S. Bybee, which would later become widely known as the "Torture Memo".

General Counsel Mora led a faction of the Working Group in arguing against these standards, and argued the issues with Yoo in person. The working group's final report, was signed and delivered to Guantánamo without the knowledge of Mora and the others who had opposed its content. Nonetheless, Mora has maintained that detainee treatment has been consistent with the law since 15 January 2003 suspension of previously approved interrogation tactics.

On 1 May 2005, the New York Times reported on a high-level military investigation into accusations of detainee abuse at Guantánamo, conducted by Lt. Gen. Randall M. Schmidt of the Air Force, and dealing with:

accounts by agents for the Federal Bureau of Investigation who complained after witnessing detainees subjected to several forms of harsh treatment. The F.B.I. agents wrote in memorandums that were never meant to be disclosed publicly that they had seen female interrogators forcibly squeeze male prisoners' genitals, and that they had witnessed other detainees stripped and shackled low to the floor for many hours.

In June 2005, the United States House Committee on Armed Services visited the camp and described it as a "resort" and complimented the quality of the food. Democratic members of the committee complained that Republicans had blocked the testimony of attorneys representing the prisoners. On 12 July 2005, members of a military panel told the committee that they proposed disciplining prison commander Army Major General Geoffrey Miller over the interrogation of Mohamed al-Kahtani, who was regularly beaten, humiliated, and psychologically assaulted. They said the recommendation was overruled by General Bantz J. Craddock, commander of U.S. Southern Command, who referred the matter to the Army's inspector general.

The Senate Armed Services Committee Report on Detainee Treatment was declassified and released in 2009. It stated,

The abuse of detainees in U.S. custody cannot simply be attributed to the actions of "a few bad apples" acting on their own. The fact is that senior officials in the United States government solicited information on how to use aggressive techniques, redefined the law to create the appearance of their legality, and authorized their use against detainees. Those efforts damaged our ability to collect accurate intelligence that could save lives, strengthened the hand of our enemies, and compromised our moral authority.

== Legal issues ==
=== President Bush's military order ===
On 14 September 2001, Congress passed the Authorization for Use of Military Force Against Terrorists, giving the President of the United States broad powers to prosecute a war on terror in response to the September 11 attacks. Secretary of State Colin Powell and State Department Legal Advisor William Howard Taft IV advised that the President must observe the Geneva Conventions. Colonel Lawrence Morris proposed holding public hearings modeled on the Nuremberg trials. Major General Thomas Romig, the Judge Advocate General of the United States Army, recommended any new military tribunals be modeled on existing courts-martial.

However, Assistant Attorney General for the Office of Legal Counsel Jay Bybee, relying on the unitary executive theory developed by Deputy Assistant Attorney General John Yoo, advised the president in a series of memos that he could hold enemy combatants abroad, indefinitely, without congressional oversight, and free from judicial review. On 13 November 2001, President George W. Bush signed a military order titled the Detention, Treatment, and Trial of Certain Non-Citizens in the War Against Terrorism, which sought to detain and try enemy combatants by military commissions under presidential authority alone.

=== Rasul v. Bush (2004) ===
On 19 February 2002, Guantanamo detainees petitioned in federal court for a writ of habeas corpus to review the legality of their detention. U.S. District Judge Colleen Kollar-Kotelly denied the detainees' petitions on 30 July 2002, finding that aliens in Cuba had no access to U.S. courts.

In Al Odah v. United States, a panel of the United States Court of Appeals for the District of Columbia Circuit including Judge Merrick Garland affirmed on 11 March 2003.

On 28 June 2004, the Supreme Court of the United States decided against the Government in Rasul v. Bush. Justice John Paul Stevens, writing for a five-justice majority, held that the detainees had a statutory right to petition federal courts for habeas review.

That same day, the Supreme Court ruled against the Government in Hamdi v. Rumsfeld. Justice Sandra Day O'Connor wrote the four-justice plurality opinion finding that an American citizen detained in Guantanamo had a constitutional right to petition federal courts for habeas review under the Due Process Clause.

=== Hamdan v. Rumsfeld (2006) ===
Deputy Defense Secretary Paul Wolfowitz responded by creating "Combatant Status Review Tribunals" (CSRTs) to determine if detainees were unlawful combatants. Detainees' habeas petitions to the United States District Court for the District of Columbia were consolidated into two cases. In one, Judge Richard J. Leon rejected the detainees' petition because they "have no cognizable Constitutional rights" on 19 January 2005. In the other, Judge Joyce Hens Green granted the detainees' petition, finding the CSRTs violated the detainees' constitutional rights on 31 January 2005. Separately, on 8 November 2004, Judge James Robertson had granted Salim Hamdan's petition challenging that the military commission trying the detainee for war crimes was not a competent tribunal, prompting commentary by European law professors.

The Combatant Status Reviews were completed in March 2005. Thirty-eight of the detainees were found not to be enemy combatants. After the dossier of determined enemy combatant Murat Kurnaz was accidentally declassified Judge Green wrote it "fails to provide significant details to support its conclusory allegations, does not reveal the sources for its information and is contradicted by other evidence in the record." Eugene R. Fidell, said that, the Kurnaz' dossier, "suggests the [CSRT] procedure is a sham; if a case like that can get through, then the merest scintilla of evidence against someone would carry the day for the government, even if there's a mountain of evidence on the other side."

The Washington Post included the following cases as among those showing the problems with the CSRT process: Mustafa Ait Idir, Moazzam Begg, Murat Kurnaz, Feroz Abbasi, and Martin Mubanga.

On 15 July 2005, a panel of the D.C. Circuit including then-Circuit Judge John Roberts vacated all those lower rulings and threw out the detainees' petitions. On 7 November 2005, the Supreme Court agreed to review that judgment. On 30 December 2005, Congress responded by passing the Detainee Treatment Act, which changed the statute to explicitly strip detainees of any right to petition courts for habeas review.

On 29 June 2006, the Supreme Court decided against the Government in Hamdan v. Rumsfeld. Justice Stevens, writing for a five-justice majority, found that courts had jurisdiction to hear those detainees' petitions which had been filed before Congress enacted the DTA and that the CSRTs violated the Geneva Conventions standards enacted in the Uniform Code of Military Justice.

=== Boumediene v. Bush (2008) ===
Congress responded by passing the Military Commissions Act of 2006, which gave statutory authorization to the CSRTs and was explicit in retroactively stripping detainees of any right to petition courts for habeas review. On 20 February 2007, D.C. Circuit Judge A. Raymond Randolph, joined by Judge David B. Sentelle upheld the Act and dismissed the detainees' petitions, over the dissent of Judge Judith W. Rogers.

On 12 June 2008, the U.S. Supreme Court decided against the government in Boumediene v. Bush. Justice Anthony Kennedy, writing for a five-justice majority, held that the detainees had a right to petition federal courts for writs of habeas corpus under the United States Constitution. Justice Antonin Scalia strongly dissented, writing that the Court's decision, "will almost certainly cause more Americans to be killed".

=== Other court rulings ===
After being ordered to do so by U.S. District Judge Jed S. Rakoff, on 3 March 2006, the Department of Defense released the names of 317 out of approximately 500 alleged enemy combatants being held in Guantánamo Bay, citing again privacy concerns as reason to withhold some names.

French judge Jean-Claude Kross, on 27 September 2006, postponed a verdict in the trial of six former Guantánamo Bay detainees accused of attending combat training at an al Qaeda camp in Afghanistan, saying the court needs more information on French intelligence missions to Guantánamo. Defense lawyers for the six men, all French nationals, accused the French government of colluding with U.S. authorities over their detentions; they said the government sought to use inadmissible evidence, as it was obtained through secret service interviews with the detainees without their lawyers present. Kross scheduled new hearings for 2 May 2007, calling the former head of counterterrorism at the French Direction de la surveillance du territoire intelligence agency to testify.

On 21 October 2008, United States district court Judge Richard J. Leon ordered the release of the five Algerians held at Guantánamo Bay, Cuba, and the continued detention of a sixth, Bensayah Belkacem.

=== Access to counsel ===
In the summer of 2012, the government instituted a new protocol for civilian attorneys representing Guantanamo prisoners. It required lawyers to sign a memorandum of understanding, in which they agreed to certain restrictions, in order to continue to see their clients. A federal court order had governed lawyers' access to their detainee clients and classified information related to their capture and confinement. Government lawyers sought court approval to replace the court's protective order with the MOU, to enable military officials to establish and enforce their own rules about when and how detainees could have access to legal counsel.

Under the rules of the MOU, lawyers' access was restricted for those detainees who no longer have legal challenges pending. The new government rules tightened access to classified information and gave the commander of the Joint Task Force Guantanamo complete discretion over lawyers' access to the detainees, including visits to the base and letters. The Justice Department took the position that Guantanamo Bay detainees whose legal challenges have been dismissed do not need the same level of access to counsel as detainees who are still fighting in court.

On 6 September 2012, U.S. District Chief Judge Royce C. Lamberth rejected the government's arguments. Writing that the government was confusing "the roles of the jailer and the judiciary," Judge Lamberth rejected the military's assertion that it could veto meetings between lawyers and detainees. Judge Lamberth ruled that access by lawyers to their detainee-clients at Guantánamo must continue under the terms of a long-standing protective order issued by federal judges in Washington.

=== International law ===
In April 2004, Cuban diplomats tabled a United Nations resolution calling for a UN investigation of Guantánamo Bay.

In May 2007, Martin Scheinin, a United Nations rapporteur on rights in countering terrorism, released a preliminary report for the United Nations Human Rights Council. The report stated the United States violated international law, particularly the International Covenant on Civil and Political Rights, that the Bush Administration could not try such prisoners as enemy combatants in a military tribunal and could not deny them access to the evidence used against them. Prisoners have been labeled "illegal" or "unlawful enemy combatants", but several observers such as the Center for Constitutional Rights and Human Rights Watch maintain that the United States has not held the Article 5 tribunals required by the Geneva Conventions. The International Committee of the Red Cross has stated that, "Every person in enemy hands must have some status under international law: he is either a prisoner of war and, as such, covered by the Third Convention, a civilian covered by the Fourth Convention, [or] a member of the medical personnel of the armed forces who is covered by the First Convention. There is no intermediate status; nobody in enemy hands can fall outside the law." Thus, if the detainees are not classified as prisoners of war, this would still grant them the rights of the Fourth Geneva Convention, as opposed to the more common Third Geneva Convention, which deals exclusively with prisoners of war. A U.S. court has rejected this argument as it applies to detainees from al Qaeda. Henry T. King, Jr., a prosecutor for the Nuremberg Trials, has argued that the type of tribunals at Guantánamo Bay "violates the Nuremberg principles" and that they are against "the spirit of the Geneva Conventions of 1949."

Some have argued in favor of a summary execution of all unlawful combatants, using Ex parte Quirin as the precedent, a case during World War II that upheld the use of military tribunals for eight German saboteurs caught on U.S. soil while wearing civilian clothes. The Germans were deemed to be unlawful combatants and thus not entitled to POW status. Six of the eight were executed as spies in the electric chair on the request of the U.S. President Franklin D. Roosevelt. The validity of this case, as basis for denying prisoners in the war on terrorism protection by the Geneva Conventions, has been disputed. A report by the American Bar Association commenting on this case, states that the Quirin case "does not stand for the proposition that detainees may be held incommunicado and denied access to counsel." The report notes that the Quirin defendants could seek review and were represented by counsel.

A report published in April 2011 in the PLoS Medicine journal looked at the cases of nine individuals for evidence of torture and ill treatment and documentation by medical personnel at the base by reviewing medical records and relevant legal case files (client affidavits, attorney–client notes and summaries, and legal affidavits of medical experts). The findings in these nine cases from the base indicate that medical doctors and mental health personnel assigned to the DoD neglected or concealed medical evidence of intentional harm, and the detainees complained of "abusive interrogation methods that are consistent with torture as defined by the UN Convention Against Torture as well as the more restrictive US definition of torture that was operational at the time". The group Physicians for Human Rights has claimed that health professionals were active participants in the development and implementation of the interrogation sessions, and monitored prisoners to determine the effectiveness of the methods used, a possible violation of the Nuremberg Code, which bans human experimentation on prisoners.

=== Lease agreement for Guantanamo ===
The base, which is considered legally to be leased by the Cuban government to the United States, is on territory that is recognized by both governments to be sovereign Cuban territory. The naval base at Guantanamo Bay was leased by Cuba to the American government through the "Agreement Between the United States and Cuba for the Lease of Lands for Coaling and Naval stations", signed by the President of Cuba and the President of the United States on 23 February 1903. The lease agreement from 1903 says in Article 2:

The grant of the foregoing Article shall include the right to use and occupy the waters adjacent to said areas of land and water, and to improve and deepen the entrances thereto and the anchorages therein, and generally to do any and all things necessary to fit the premises for use as coaling or naval stations only, and for no other purpose.

— Agreement Between the United States and Cuba for the Lease of Lands for Coaling and Naval stations; February 23, 1903

In 1934, the newly revised Cuban–American Treaty of Relations reaffirmed Article 2's provision of the previous treaty of leasing Guantánamo Bay Naval Base to the United States. Article 3 of the treaty states:

Until the two contracting parties agree to the modification or abrogation of the stipulations of the agreement in regard to the lease to the United States of America of lands in Cuba for coaling and naval stations signed by the President of the Republic of Cuba on February 16, 1903, and by the President of the United States of America on the 23d day of the same month and year, the stipulations of that agreement with regard to the naval station of Guantanamo shall continue in effect. The supplementary agreement in regard to naval or coaling stations signed between the two Governments on July 2, 1903, also shall continue in effect in the same form and on the same conditions with respect to the naval station at Guantanamo. So long as the United States of America shall not abandon the said naval station of Guantanamo or the two Governments shall not agree to a modification of its present limits, the station shall continue to have the territorial area that it now has, with the limits that it has on the date of the signature of the present Treaty.

— Treaty Between the United States of America and Cuba; May 29, 1934

The post-1959 Cuban government claimed the treaty was forced upon them by the United States and therefore was a not valid legal agreement. However, Article 4 of the Vienna Convention on the Law of Treaties says its provisions shall not be applied retroactively.

== Guantanamo military commission ==
The American Bar Association announced that: "In response to the unprecedented attacks of September 11, on 13 November 2001, the President announced that certain non-citizens [of the US] would be subject to detention and trial by military authorities. The order provides that non-citizens whom the government deems to be, or to have been, members of the al Qaida organization or to have engaged in, aided or abetted, or conspired to commit acts of international terrorism that have caused, threaten to cause, or have as their aim to cause, injury to or adverse effects on the United States or its citizens, or to have knowingly harbored such individuals, are subject to detention by military authorities and trial before a military commission."

On 28 and 29 September 2006, the U.S. Senate and House of Representatives, respectively, passed the Military Commissions Act of 2006, a controversial bill that allows the President to designate certain people with the status of "unlawful enemy combatants" thus making them subject to military commissions, where they have fewer civil rights than in regular trials.

=== "Camp Justice" ===
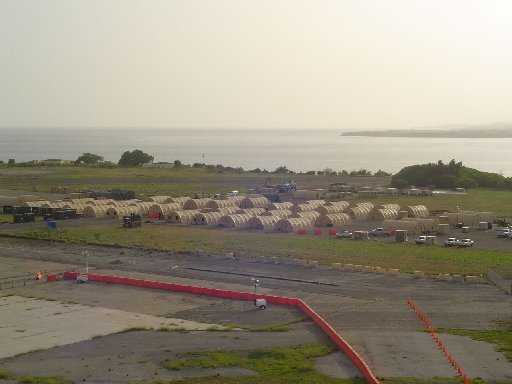
Tents where visiting lawyers, human rights observers, and reporters were to stay when watching or participating in the Military Commissions

In 2007, Camp Justice was the informal name granted to the complex where Guantánamo detainees would face charges before the Guantanamo military commissions, as authorized by the Military Commissions Act of 2006. It was named by Sgt Neil Felver of the 122 Civil Engineering Squadron in a contest. Initially the complex was to be a permanent facility, costing over $100 million. The U.S. Congress overruled the Bush Administration's plans. The camp was redesigned as a portable, temporary facility, costing approximately $10 million.

On 2 January 2008, the Toronto Star reporter Michelle Shephard offered an account of the security precautions that reporters go through before they can attend the hearings:

- Reporters were not allowed to bring in more than one pen;
- Female reporters were frisked if they wore underwire bras;
- Reporters were not allowed to bring in their traditional coil-ring notepads;
- The bus bringing reporters to the hearing room is checked for explosives before it leaves;
- 200 meters from the hearing room, reporters dismount, pass through metal detectors, and are sniffed by chemical detectors for signs of exposure to explosives;
- Eight reporters are allowed into the hearing room—the remainder watch over closed circuit television.

Reporters are not supposed to hear the sound from the court directly. A 20-second delay is inserted. If a classified document is read, a red light starts and the sound is turned off immediately.

On 1 November 2008, David McFadden of the Associated Press stated the 100 tents erected to hold lawyers, reporters and observers were practically deserted when he and two other reporters covered the military commission for Ali Hamza al-Bahlul in late October 2008.

Two detainees have been convicted by military court of various charges:

- David Hicks, an Australian citizen, was found guilty in a plea bargain, of providing material support for terrorism in 2001, according to his military lawyer under retrospective legislation introduced in 2006. On 18 February 2015, David Hicks' appeal against his conviction was upheld by the United States Military Commission Review and his conviction was overturned.
- Salim Hamdan was convicted of being Osama bin Laden's driver. After his release, he appealed his case. On 16 October 2012, the United States Court of Appeals for the District of Columbia Circuit vacated Hamdan's conviction, on the grounds that the acts he was charged with under the Military Commissions Act of 2006 were not, in fact, crimes at the time he committed them, rendering it an ex post facto prosecution.

== Release of prisoners ==
Two hundred detainees were released in 2004 before any Combatant Status Review Tribunals were held, including the Tipton Three, all British citizens.

On 27 July 2004, four French detainees were repatriated and remanded in custody by the French intelligence agency Direction de la Surveillance du Territoire. The remaining three French detainees were released in March 2005.

On 4 August 2004, the Tipton Three, ex-detainees who had been returned to the UK in March of that year (and freed by the British authorities within 24 hours of their return) filed a report in the US claiming persistent severe abuse at the camp, of themselves and others.

=== Administrative Review Board ===
The detainees at Guantanamo Bay prison underwent a series of CSRTs with the purpose of confirming or vacating their statuses as enemy combatants. In these reviews, the prisoners were interviewed thoroughly on the details of their crimes and roles in Taliban and al Qaeda activities, including the extent of their relationship and correspondence with Osama Bin Laden. In these interviews, the detainees also extensively detailed the alleged abuse and neglect that they faced while in detention at Guantanamo Bay Prison. The events described by these prisoners violated the Geneva Conventions standards of conduct with prisoners of war, yet the conventions were previously claimed to not protect members of the Taliban or al Qaeda militias in correspondence between the Department of Defense, the Assistant Attorney General, and U.S. Department of Justice in 2002. The full versions of these Combatant Status Reviews were released in 2016 in response to an ACLU lawsuit.

Besides convening CSRTs, the Department of Defence initiated a similar, annual review. Like the CSRTs, the Board did not have a mandate to review whether detainees qualified for POW (Prisoner Of War) status under the Geneva Conventions. The Board's mandate was to consider the factors for and against the continued detention of detainees, and make a recommendation either for their retention, release, or transfer to the custody of their country of origin, and the first set of annual reviews considered the dossiers of 463 detainees. The first board met between 14 December 2004, and 23 December 2005. The Board recommended the release of 14 detainees, and repatriation of 120 detainees to the custody of their country of origin.

By November 2005, 358 of the then-505 detainees held at Guantanamo Bay had Administrative Review Board hearings. Of these, 3% were granted and were awaiting release, 20% were to be transferred, 37% were to be further detained at Guantanamo, and no decision had been made in 40% of the cases.

Of two dozen Uyghur detainees at Guantanamo Bay, The Washington Post reported on 25 August 2005, fifteen were found not to be "enemy combatants". Although cleared of terrorism, these Uyghurs remained in detention at Guantanamo because the United States refused to return them to China, fearing that China would "imprison, persecute or torture them" because of internal political issues. US officials said that their overtures to approximately 20 countries to grant the individuals asylum had been declined, leaving the men with no destination for release. On 5 May 2006, five Uyghurs were transported to refugee camps in Albania and the Department of Justice filed an "Emergency Motion to Dismiss as Moot" on the same day. One of the Uyghurs' lawyers characterized the sudden transfer as an attempt "to avoid having to answer in court for keeping innocent men in jail."

In August 2006, Murat Kurnaz, a legal resident of Germany, was released from Guantánamo with no charges after having been held for five years.

=== President Obama ===
As of 15 June 2009, Guantánamo held more than 220 detainees.

The United States was negotiating with Palau to accept a group of innocent Chinese Uyghur Muslims who have been held at Guantánamo Bay. The Department of Justice announced on 12 June 2009, that Saudi Arabia had accepted three Uyghurs. The same week, one detainee was released to Iraq, and one to Chad.

Also that week, four Uyghur detainees were resettled in Bermuda, where they were released. On 11 June 2009, the US Government negotiated a deal in secret with the Bermudian Premier, Ewart Brown, to release four Uyghur detainees to Bermuda, an overseas territory of the UK. The detainees were flown into Bermuda under the cover of darkness. The US purposely kept the information of this transfer secret from the UK, which handles all foreign affairs and security issues for Bermuda, as it was feared that the deal would collapse. After the story was leaked by the US media, Premier Brown gave a national address to inform the people of Bermuda. Many Bermuda residents objected, as did the UK Government. It undertook an informal review of the actions; the Bermuda opposition, UBP, made a tabled vote of no confidence in Brown.

Italy agreed on 15 June 2009, to accept three prisoners. Ireland agreed on 29 July 2009, to accept two prisoners. The same day, the European Union said that its member states would accept some detainees. In January 2011, WikiLeaks revealed that Switzerland accepted several Guantanamo detainees as a quid pro quo with the U.S. to limit a multibillion tax probe against Swiss banking group UBS.

In December 2009, the U.S. reported that, since 2002, more than 550 detainees had departed Guantánamo Bay for other destinations, including Albania, Algeria, Afghanistan, Australia, Bangladesh, Bahrain, Belgium, Bermuda, Chad, Denmark, Egypt, France, Hungary, Iran, Iraq, Ireland, Italy, Jordan, Kuwait, Libya, Maldives, Mauritania, Morocco, Pakistan, Palau, Portugal, Russia, Saudi Arabia, Spain, Sweden, Sudan, Tajikistan, Turkey, Uganda, United Kingdom, Canada, and Yemen.

The Guantanamo Review Task Force issued a Final Report 22 January 2010, but did not publicly release it until 28 May of that year. The report recommended releasing 126 then-current detainees to their homes or to a third country, prosecuting 36 in either federal court or by a military commission, and holding 48 indefinitely under the laws of war. In addition, 30 Yemenis were approved for release if security conditions in their home country improve. Since the release of the report, over 60 detainees have been transferred to other countries, while two detainees have died in custody.

In March 2011, President Obama issued Executive Order 13567, which created the Periodic Review Board. Senior Civil Service officials from six agencies sit on the Board and consider detainee transfers. Each member has a veto over any recommendation.

Under the Obama administration, the Board examined 63 detainees, recommending 37 of those to be transferred.

Of the 693 total former detainees transferred out of Guantanamo, 30% are suspected or confirmed to have engaged in terrorist activity after transfer. Of those detainees who were transferred out under Obama, 5.6% are confirmed and 6.8% are suspected of engaging in terrorist activity after transfer.

=== President Biden ===
On 19 July 2021, The U.S. Department of State under the Biden Administration released Moroccan national Abdul Latif Nasir into the custody of his home country. Nasir was the first Guantanamo detainee released since 2016 and after his departure 39 detainees still remained imprisoned. Nasir was originally cleared for release by the Obama Administration in 2016 but remained in custody initially due to bureaucratic delays and later due to President Trump's policy changes restricting Guantanamo prisoner releases. A State Department spokesman stated, "The Biden Administration remains dedicated to a deliberate and thorough process focused on responsibly reducing the detainee population and ultimately closing of the Guantanamo facility." Critics have contended that the Biden administration may not be prepared or able to fully close the prison on the basis that, "In order to close the prison, Biden would need to move all 39 detainees to other prisons or locations", and that there have not been enough concrete steps taken in order to ensure existing detainees are successfully relocated and the closing steps are carried out.

Over the course of spring 2022, the American government released three more detainees; Mohammed al-Qahtani, Sufyian Barhoumi, and Asadullah Haroon Gul. In fall 2022, the government released Saifullah Paracha, the oldest prisoner.

In January 2025, the United States transferred 11 Yemeni prisoners from Guantánamo Bay to a detention facility in Oman, citing the reduced occupancy at the Guantanamo Bay facility. The Omani government agreed to host the detainees as part of a broader international effort to further reduce the detainee population at Guantanamo.

== Subsequent actions of some released detainees ==
On 8 March 2016, Reuters reported that "111 of 532 prisoners released by the administration of President George W. Bush are confirmed to have returned to the battlefield, with 74 others suspected of doing so". It further reported that "seven out of 144 Guantanamo prisoners who were freed since Obama took office in January 2009 have returned to fighting," with "number of former Guantanamo Bay prison inmates who are suspected of having returned to fighting for militants doubled to 12 in the six months through January". In summary, 118 of 676, or 17%, are confirmed to have returned to terrorism, with a further 86 (13%) suspected, totaling 30% known or suspected of having returned to terrorism. The government numbers are disputed, with Guantánamo defense lawyer Michel Paradis, complaining the definition of "terrorism" includes giving speeches or interviews or writing books critical of the United States and their treatment at Guantanamo Bay. In comparison, one 2018 study found of domestic U.S. prisoners released after serving a sentence, 43.4% were arrested for another violent offense within 9 years.

On 13 January 2009, the Pentagon said that it had evidence that 18 former detainees have had direct involvement in terrorist activities, but declined to provide their identities to the media.

Airat Vakhitov (a Tajikistan national) and Rustam Akhmyarov (a Russian national) were captured in Afghanistan in December 2001 and released from Guantánamo in 2004. They were arrested on 27 August 2005 by Russian authorities in Moscow, for allegedly preparing a series of attacks in Russia. According to authorities, Vakhitov was using a local human rights group as cover for his activities. The men were released on 2 September 2005, and no charges were pressed.

Abdallah Salih al-Ajmi, a Kuwaiti former detainee, committed a suicide attack in Mosul, on 25 March 2008. Al-Ajmi had been repatriated from Guantánamo in 2005, and transferred to Kuwaiti custody. A Kuwaiti court later acquitted him of terrorism charges.

On 24 July 2015, Belgium detained two people that had been released from Guantánamo Bay. They were arrested by Belgian authorities on charges of terrorism: "Moussa Zemmouri, a 37-year-old Belgian of Moroccan origin, and an Algerian whom the prosecutor's office identified as Soufiane A". Both were cleared of the criminal conspiracy charges.

In December 2015, the Miami Herald reported that "Guardians of Shariah", an "offshoot of Osama bin Laden's organisation", put out a video featuring Ibrahim al Qosi as a "religious leader" in a "key position in Al-Qaida of the Arabian Peninsula" (AQAP). Al Qosi was imprisoned in Guantanamo from 2002 to 2012. At the time of his release from Guantánamo, his wife was "the daughter of a former chief bodyguard to bin Laden." Al Quosi was bin Laden's accountant in the early 90s and moved to Afghanistan with bin Laden in 1996. In 2010, Al Qosi pleaded guilty to being bin Laden's chauffeur. The AQAP video stated "he participated in the famous battle of Tora Bora" with bin Laden.

Paul Lewis, a Pentagon employee charged with Guantánamo closure, told lawmakers that Americans had been killed by prisoners released from Guantanamo Bay. He declined to provide details, including whether the incidents occurred before or after Obama took office in 2009. According to the Associated Press, an anonymous Obama administration official said that Lewis was referring to an incident involving an Afghan prisoner released while George W. Bush was president.

At least two former Guantánamo Bay prisoners participated in the overthrow of the government of Afghanistan in August 2021.

== Criticism and condemnation ==
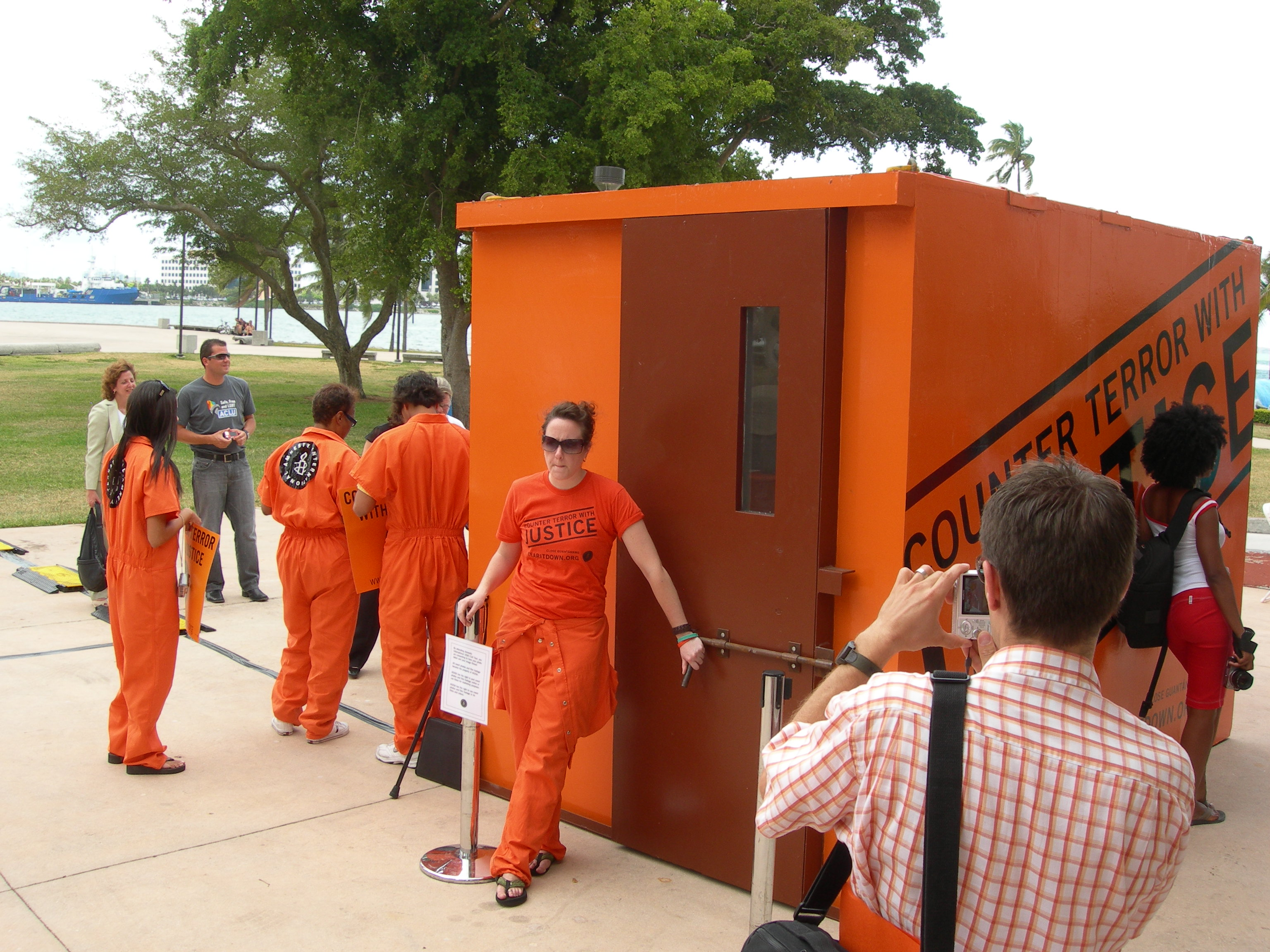
Amnesty International protests the detentions using a mock cell and prison outfits.

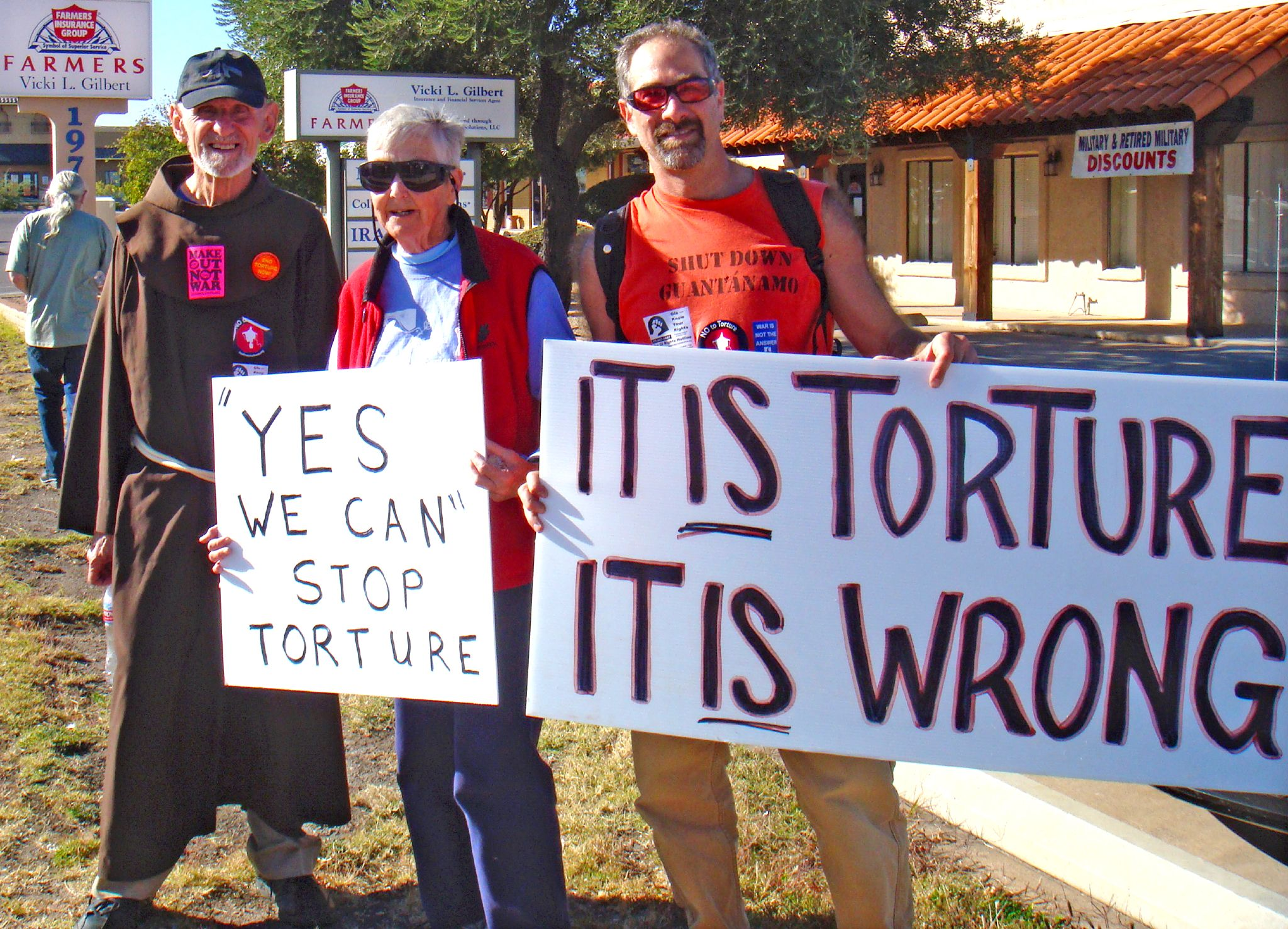
Protesters at Ft. Huachuca against the US policy of endorsing torture

European Union members and the Organization of American States, as well as non-governmental organizations such as Amnesty International and Human Rights Watch, have protested the legal status and physical condition of detainees at Guantánamo. The human rights organization Human Rights Watch has criticized the Bush administration over this designation in its 2003 world report, stating: "Washington has ignored human rights standards in its own treatment of terrorism suspects. It has refused to apply the Geneva Conventions to prisoners of war from Afghanistan, and has misused the designation of 'illegal combatant' to apply to criminal suspects on U.S. soil." On 25 May 2005, Amnesty International released its annual report calling the facility the "gulag of our times". Lord Steyn called it "a monstrous failure of justice", because "... The military will act as interrogators, prosecutors and defense counsel, judges, and when death sentences are imposed, as executioners. The trials will be held in private. None of the guarantees of a fair trial need be observed."

Another senior British Judge, Mr Justice Collins, said of the detention center: "America's idea of what is torture is not the same as the United Kingdom's." At the beginning of December 2003, there were media reports that military lawyers appointed to defend alleged terrorists being held by the United States at Guantánamo Bay had expressed concern about the legal process for military commissions. The Guardian newspaper from the United Kingdom reported that a team of lawyers was dismissed after complaining that the rules for the forthcoming military commissions prohibited them from properly representing their clients. New York's Vanity Fair reported that some of the lawyers felt their ethical obligations were being violated by the process. The Pentagon strongly denied the claims in these media reports. It was reported on 5 May 2007, that many lawyers were sent back and some detainees refuse to see their lawyers, while others decline mail from their lawyers or refuse to provide information on their cases (see also Mail privileges of Guantanamo Bay detainees).

The New York Times and other newspapers are critical of the camp; columnist Thomas Friedman urged George W. Bush to "just shut it down", calling Camp Delta "... worse than an embarrassment." Another New York Times editorial supported Friedman's proposal, arguing that Guantánamo is part of "... a chain of shadowy detention camps that includes Abu Ghraib in Iraq, the military prison at Bagram Air Base in Afghanistan and other secret locations run by the intelligence agencies" that are "part of a tightly linked global detention system with no accountability in law."

In November 2005, a group of experts from the United Nations Commission on Human Rights called off their visit to Camp Delta, originally scheduled for 6 December, saying that the United States was not allowing them to conduct private interviews with the prisoners. "Since the Americans have not accepted the minimum requirements for such a visit, we must cancel [it]," Manfred Nowak, the UN envoy in charge of investigating torture allegations around the world, told AFP. The group, nevertheless, stated its intention to write a report on conditions at the prison based on eyewitness accounts from released detainees, meetings with lawyers and information from human rights groups.

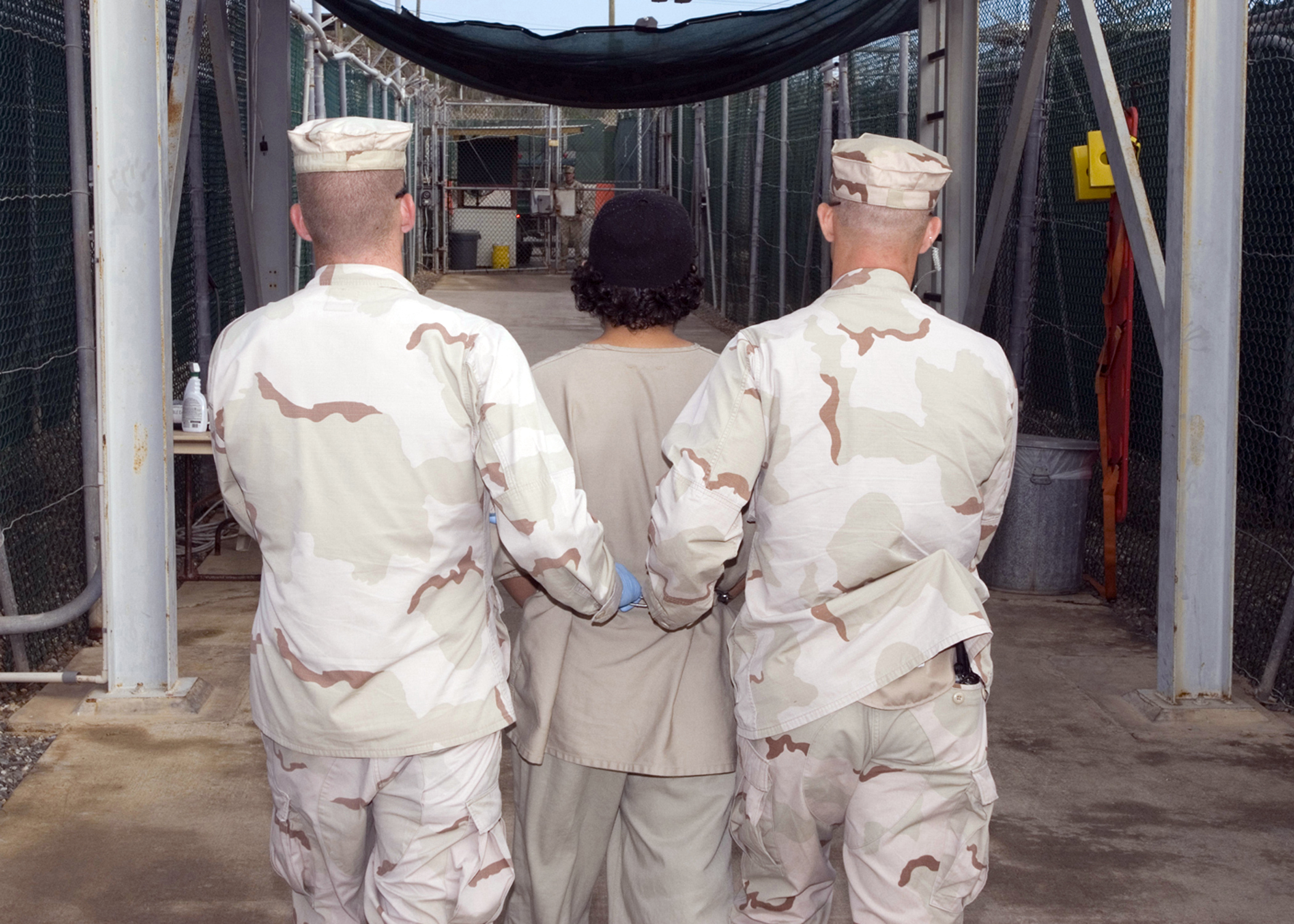
Detainee being escorted

In February 2006, the UN group released its report, which called on the U.S. either to try or release all suspected terrorists. The report, issued by the Working Group on Arbitrary Detention, has the subtitle Situation of detainees at Guantánamo Bay. This includes, as an appendix, the U.S. ambassador's reply to the draft versions of the report in which he restates the U.S. government's position on the detainees.

European leaders have also voiced their opposition to the internment center. On 13 January 2006, German Chancellor Angela Merkel criticized the U.S. detention of prisoners at Guantánamo Bay: "An institution like Guantánamo, in its present form, cannot and must not exist in the long term. We must find different ways of dealing with prisoners. As far as I'm concerned, there's no question about that," she declared in a 9 January interview to Der Spiegel. Meanwhile, in the UK, Peter Hain, the Secretary of State for Northern Ireland, stated during a live broadcast of Question Time (16 February 2006) that: "I would prefer that it wasn't there and I would prefer it was closed." His cabinet colleague and Former Prime Minister of the United Kingdom, Tony Blair, declared the following day that the center was "an anomaly and sooner or later it's got to be dealt with."

On 10 March 2006, a letter in The Lancet was published, signed by more than 250 medical experts urging the United States to stop force-feeding of detainees and close down the prison. Force-feeding is specifically prohibited by the World Medical Association force-feeding declarations of Tokyo and Malta, to which the American Medical Association is a signatory. Dr David Nicholl who had initiated the letter stated that the definition of torture as only actions that cause "death or major organ failure" was "not a definition anyone on the planet is using."

There has also been significant criticism from Arab leaders: on 6 May 2005, prominent Kuwaiti parliamentarian Waleed Al Tabtabaie demanded that U.S. President Bush "uncover what is going on inside Guantánamo," allow family visits to the hundreds of Muslim detainees there, and allow an independent investigation of detention conditions.

In May 2006, the Attorney General for England and Wales Lord Goldsmith said the camp's existence was "unacceptable" and tarnished the U.S. traditions of liberty and justice. "The historic tradition of the United States as a beacon of freedom, liberty and of justice deserves the removal of this symbol," he said. Also in May 2006, the UN Committee Against Torture condemned prisoners' treatment at Guantánamo Bay, noted that indefinite detention constitutes per se a violation of the UN Convention Against Torture, and called on the U.S. to shut down the Guantánamo facility. In June 2006, the European Parliament voted overwhelmingly in support of a motion urging the United States to close the camp.

In June 2006, U.S. Senator Arlen Specter stated that the arrests of most of the roughly 500 prisoners held there were based on "the flimsiest sort of hearsay." In September 2006, the UK's Lord Chancellor, Lord Falconer, who heads the UK's legal system, went further than previous British government statements, condemning the existence of the camp as a "shocking affront to democracy." Lord Falconer, who said he was expressing Government policy, made the comments in a lecture at the Supreme Court of New South Wales. According to former U.S. Secretary of State Colin Powell: "Essentially, we have shaken the belief the world had in America's justice system by keeping a place like Guantánamo open and creating things like the military commission. We don't need it and it is causing us far more damage than any good we get for it."

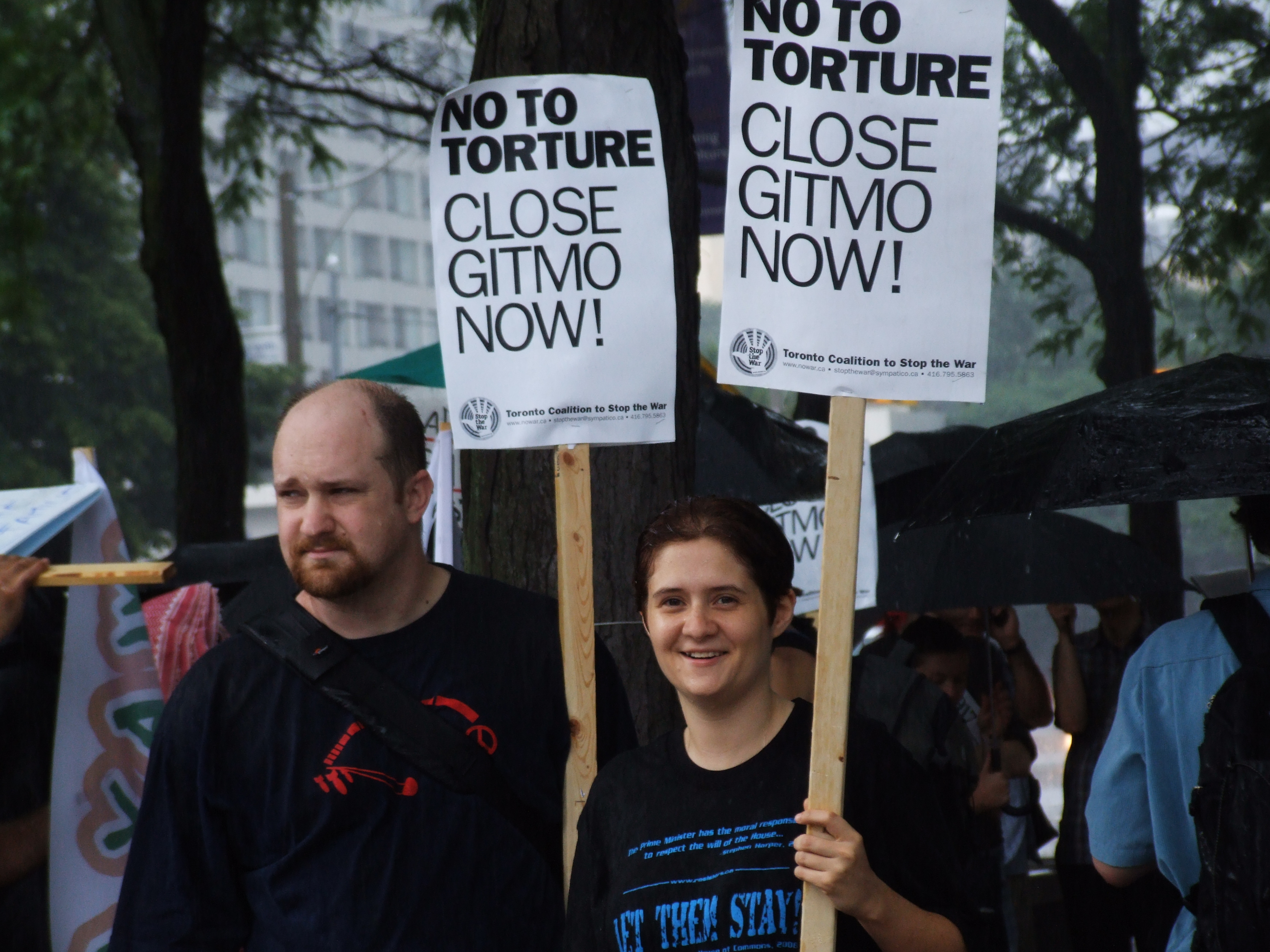
A pair of Canadian demonstrators in 2008

In March 2007, a group of British Parliamentarians formed an All-party parliamentary group to campaign against Guantánamo Bay. The group is made up of members of parliament and peers from each of the main British political parties, and is chaired by Sarah Teather with Des Turner and Richard Shepherd acting as Vice Chairs. The Group was launched with an Ambassadors' Reception in the House of Commons, bringing together a large group of lawyers, non-governmental organizations and governments with an interest in seeing the camp closed. On 26 April 2007, there was a debate in the United States Senate over the detainees at Guantánamo Bay that ended in a draw, with Democrats urging action on the prisoners' behalf but running into stiff opposition from Republicans.

Some visitors to Guantánamo have expressed more positive views on the camp. Alain Grignard, who visited Gitmo in 2006, objected to the detainees' legal status but declared that "it is a model prison, where people are better treated than in Belgian prisons." Grignard, then deputy head of Brussels' federal police anti-terrorism unit, served as expert on a trip by a group of lawmakers from the assembly of the Organization for Security and Co-operation in Europe (OSCE). "I know no Belgian prison where each inmate receives its Muslim kit," Mr. Grignard said.

According to polls conducted by the Program on International Policy (PIP) attitudes, "Large majorities in Germany and Great Britain, and pluralities in Poland and India, believe the United States has committed violations of international law at its prison on Guantánamo Bay in Cuba, including the use of torture in interrogations." PIP found a marked decrease in the perception of the U.S. as a leader of human rights as a result of the international community's opposition to the Guantánamo prison. A 2006 poll conducted by the BBC World Service together with GlobeScan in 26 countries found that 69% of respondents disapprove of the Guantánamo prison and the U.S. treatment of detainees. American actions in Guantánamo, coupled with the Abu Ghraib scandal, are considered major factors in the decline of the U.S.'s image abroad.

Michael Lehnert, who as a U.S. Marine Brigadier General helped establish the center and was its first commander for 90 days, has stated that was dismayed at what happened after he was replaced by a U.S. Army commander. Lehnert stated that he had ensured that the detainees would be treated humanely and was disappointed that his successors allowed harsh interrogations to take place. Said Lehnert, "I think we lost the moral high ground. For those who do not think much of the moral high ground, that is not that significant. But for those who think our standing in the international community is important, we need to stand for American values. You have to walk the walk, talk the talk."

In a foreword to Amnesty International's International Report 2005, the Secretary General, Irene Khan, made a passing reference to the Guantánamo Bay prison as "the gulag of our times", breaking an internal policy on not comparing different human rights abuses. The report reflected ongoing claims of prisoner abuse at Guantánamo and other military prisons. Former Soviet-era "gulag" prisoner, Pavel Litvinov, criticized the analogy saying, "By any standard, Guantanamo and similar American-run prisons elsewhere do not resemble, in their conditions of detention or their scale, the concentration camp system that was at the core of a totalitarian communist system." The comparison has been supported by some including Edmund McWilliams, and William F. Schulz.

In 2011 an article was published in Australian Folklore: A Yearly Journal of Folklore Studies that in part explored the way that the international image of the American government was shifting due to Guantánamo prison, yet in February 2012 poll 70% of Americans (including 53% of self-described liberal Democrats and 67% of moderate or conservative Democrats) replied they approve the continued operation of Guantanamo.

Morris "Moe" Davis, the former chief prosecutor for the terrorism trials at Guantanamo Bay, resigned in 2007 over objections regarding evidence obtained from waterboarding, which he viewed as a form of torture. Davis's 2013 Change.org e-petition to close Guantanamo has garnered over 220,000 signatures, and mentions the hunger strikes that "involves more than 100 prisoners, including some 21 who are being force-fed to keep them from starving to death."

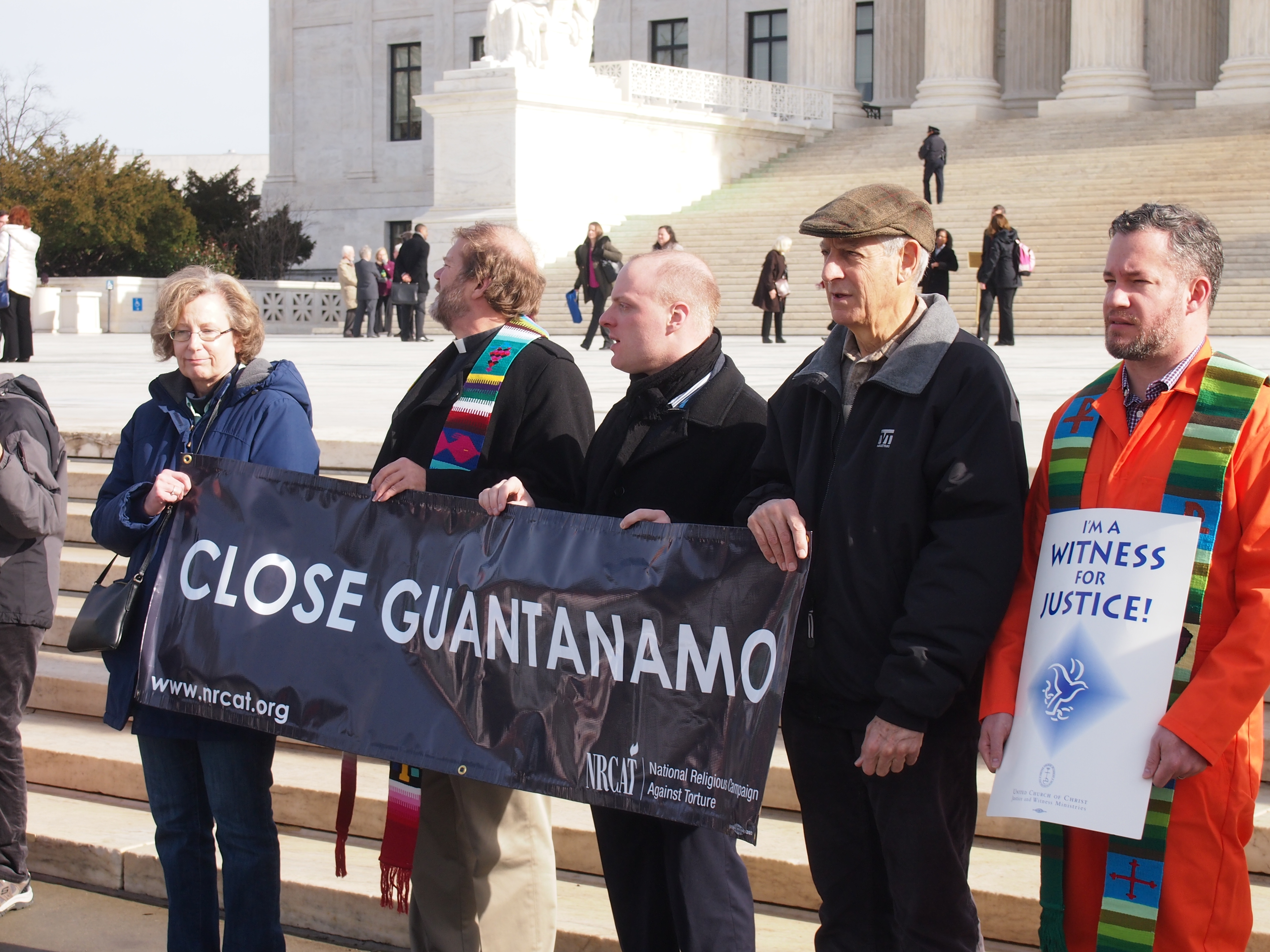
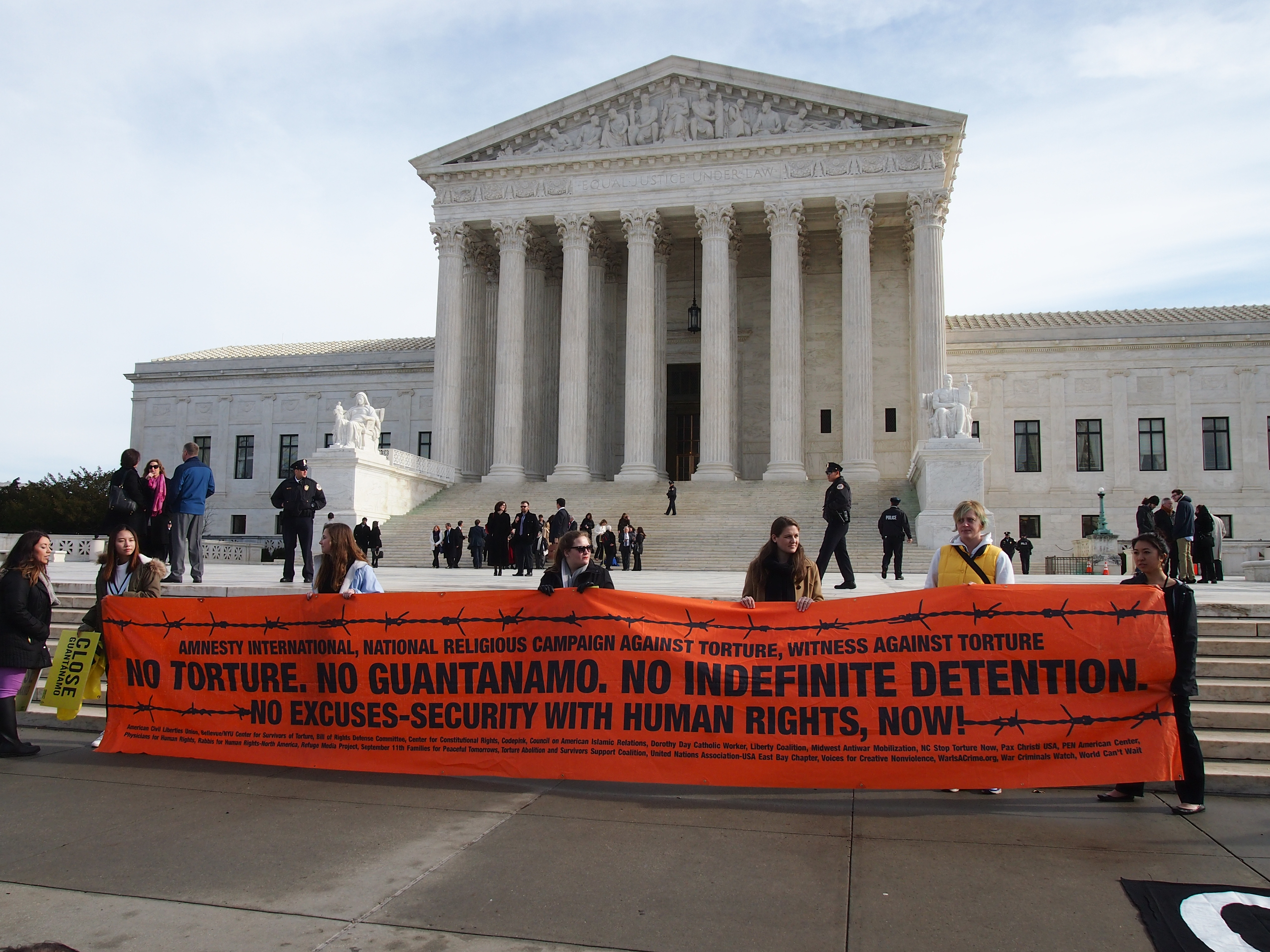
Protests to close Guantanamo Bay detention camp in 2017

On 12 December 2013, retired U.S. Marine Major General Michael R. Lehnert, who oversaw the construction of the Guantánamo detention facility, published an op-ed piece in the Detroit Free Press. He characterized the Guantanamo as "our nation's most notorious prison – a prison that should never have been opened", and provided a brief summary of its history and significance:

Our nation created Guantánamo because we were legitimately angry and frightened by an unprovoked attack on our soil on Sept. 11, 2001. We thought that the detainees would provide a treasure trove of information and intelligence.

I was ordered to construct the first 100 cells at Guantánamo within 96 hours. The first group of 20 prisoners arrived seven days after the order was given. We were told that the prisoners were the "worst of the worst", a common refrain for every set of detainees sent to Guantánamo. The U.S. has held 779 men at the detention facility over the past 12 years. There are currently 162 men there, most of them cleared for transfer, but stuck by politics.

Even in the earliest days of Guantánamo, I became more and more convinced that many of the detainees should never have been sent in the first place. They had little intelligence value, and there was insufficient evidence linking them to war crimes. That remains the case today for many, if not most, of the detainees.

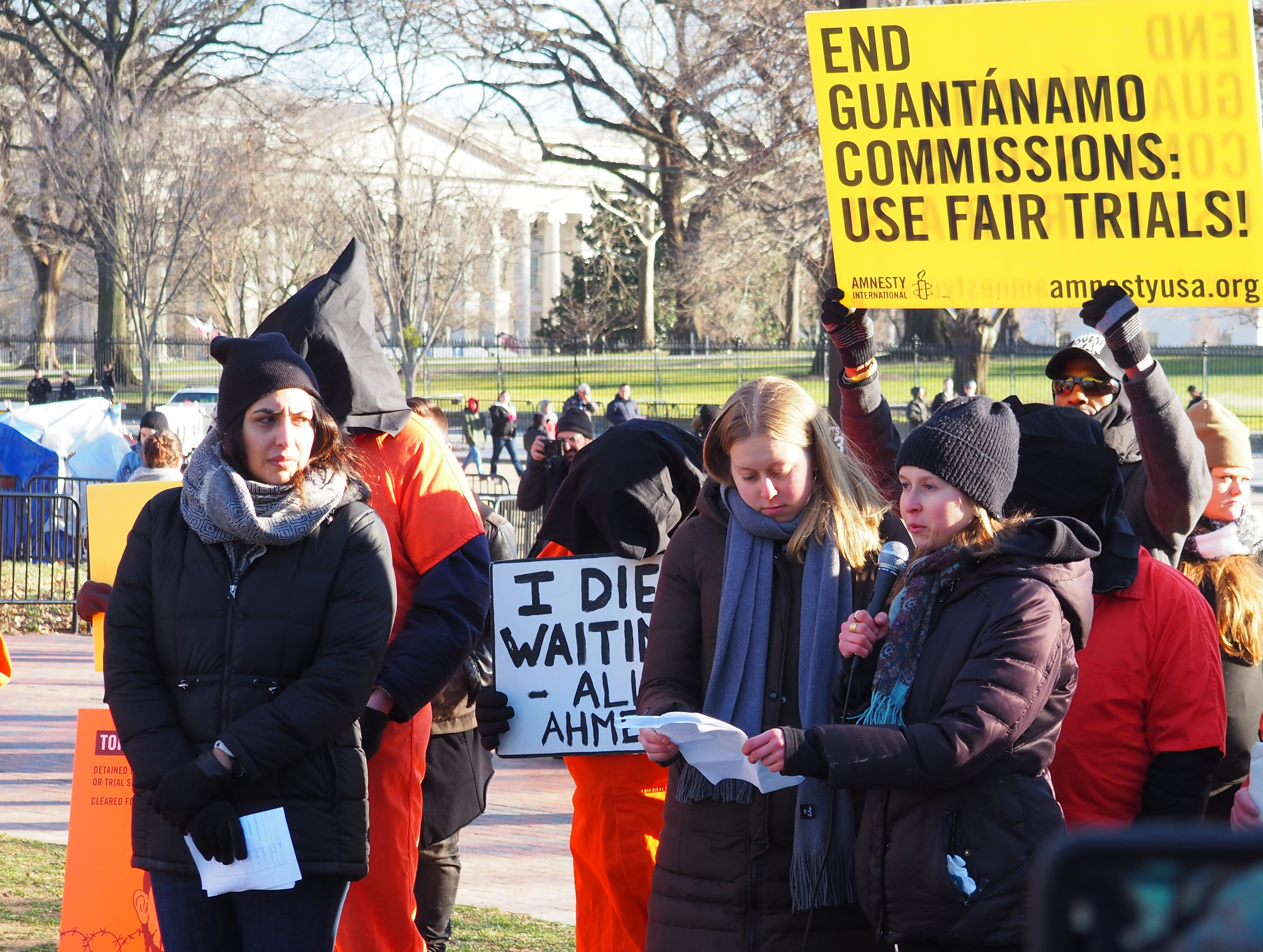
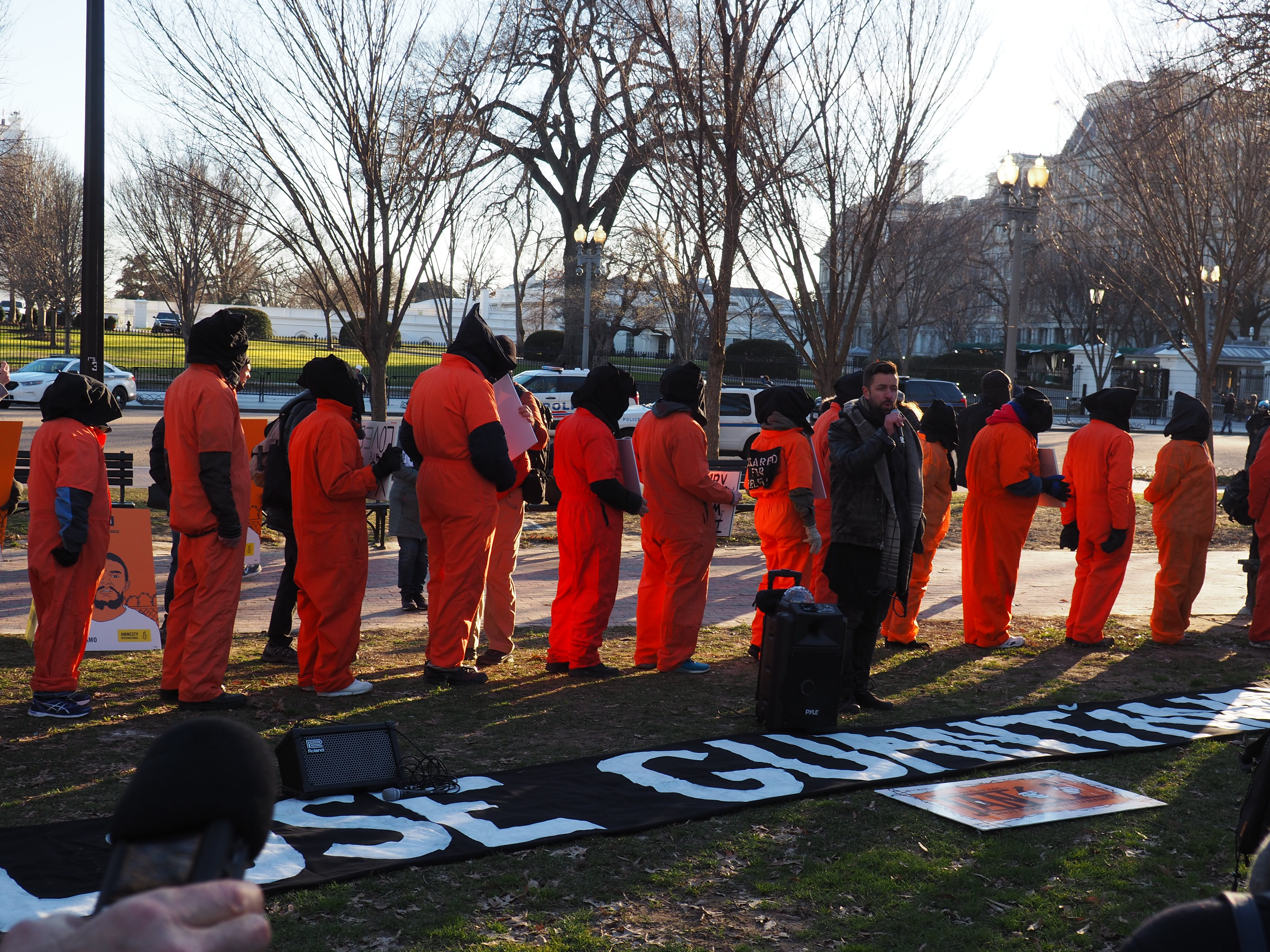
Protests to close Guantanamo Bay detention camp in 2019

In September 2016, Alberto Mora, who served as General Counsel of the Department of the Navy from 2001 to 2006, wrote that his team's research on the torture policy's broader implications revealed that "it greatly damaged national security. It incited extremism in the Middle East, hindered cooperation with U.S. allies, exposed American officials to legal repercussions, undermined U.S. diplomacy, and offered a convenient justification for other governments to commit human rights abuses."

In 2022, lawyer and constitutional scholar Baher Azmy wrote that the legal and rhetorical justifications for the authoritarian turn in Donald Trump's presidential administrations have their roots in the precedents set by Guantanamo Bay, saying "The American exceptionalism Bush deployed—to invade Muslim countries, create lawless prison sites, target an entire class of domestic residents on the basis of ethnicity and religious affiliation, and authorize torture—seamlessly morphed into the vulgar and explicit ethnonationalism of the Trump administration, which expanded executive claims to justify innumerable norm transgressions of its own."

In June 2023, United Nations Special Rapporteur on Human Rights and Counter-Terrorism, Fionnuala Ní Aoláin released her final report on the detention center. The report concludes that prisoners endure "ongoing cruel, inhuman, and degrading treatment" and that the detention center should be closed.

== Plans for closing of camp ==
=== President Obama's attempt ===
During his 2008 presidential campaign, Barack Obama described Guantánamo as a "sad chapter in American history" and promised to close down the prison in 2009. After being elected, Obama reiterated his campaign promise on 60 Minutes and the ABC program This Week. However, his attempts were largely stymied by Republican opposition in Congress.

On 22 January 2009, Obama stated that he had ordered the government to suspend prosecutions of Guantánamo Bay detainees for 120 days to review all the detainees' cases to determine whether and how each detainee should be prosecuted. A day later, Obama signed an executive order stating that Guantánamo Detention Camp would be closed within the year. His plan encountered a setback when incoming officials of his administration discovered that there were no comprehensive files concerning many of the detainees, so that merely assembling the available evidence about them could take weeks or months. In May, Obama announced that the prosecutions would be revived. On 20 May 2009, the United States Senate passed an amendment to the Supplemental Appropriations Act, 2009 (H.R. 2346) by a 90–6 vote to block funds needed for the transfer or release of prisoners held at the Guantanamo Bay detention camp. In November 2009, Obama admitted that the "specific deadline" he had set for closure of the Guantanamo Bay camp would be "missed". He said the camp would probably be closed later in 2010, but did not set a specific deadline.

In May 2009, Carol Rosenberg, writing in The Miami Herald, reported that the camps would not be immediately dismantled when the detainees are released or transferred, due to ongoing cases alleging abuse of detainees.

In August 2009, the U.S. Disciplinary Barracks at Fort Leavenworth, Kansas, and the Standish Maximum Correctional Facility in Standish, Michigan were considered potential sites for transfers of over 220 prisoners. Kansas public officials, including both of its senators and governor, objected to transferring prisoners to the former. Many in Standish, however, welcomed the move to the latter.

Obama issued a presidential memorandum dated 15 December 2009, formally closing the detention center and ordering the transfer of prisoners to the Thomson Correctional Center in Thomson, Illinois (now United States Penitentiary, Thomson). Attorney Marc Falkoff, who represents some of the Yemeni detainees, said that his clients might prefer to remain in Guantanamo rather than move into the more stark conditions at Thomson. Illinois Senator Dick Durbin's office announced on 2 October 2012 that the Obama administration and Federal Bureau of Prisons would buy the Thomson Correctional Center from Illinois for $165 million. An administration official said the deal was to address overcrowding issues, and Thomson would not be used to house any Guantánamo detainees, which the official noted was prohibited by law. "The entire facility will house only [Bureau of Prison] inmates (up to 2,800) and be operated solely by BOP. Specifically, it will be used for administrative maximum security inmates and others who have proven difficult to manage in high-security institutions," said the official, who asked not to be named. This statement was echoed in letter from U.S. Attorney General Eric Holder. "I have committed that no Guantanamo detainees will be transferred to Thomson. As you know, any such transfer would violate express legal statutory prohibitions," Holder said in a letter to Representative Frank Wolf, who fought the proposal.

The Guantanamo Review Task Force issued a final report on 22 January 2010, released on 28 May 2010. The report recommended releasing 126 current detainees to their homes or to a third country, 36 be prosecuted in either federal court or a military commission, and 48 be held indefinitely under the laws of war. In addition, 30 Yemenis were approved for release if security conditions in their home country improve.

On 7 January 2011, President Obama signed the 2011 Defense Authorization Bill which contains provisions that place restrictions on the transfer of Guantánamo prisoners to the mainland or to other foreign countries, thus impeding the closure of the detention facility. The bill prohibits the use of funds to "modify or construct facilities in the United States to house detainees transferred from" Guantánamo Bay. He strongly objected to the clauses and stated that he would work with Congress to oppose the measures. Regarding the provisions preventing the transfer of Guantánamo prisoners to the mainland, Obama wrote in a statement that the "prosecution of terrorists in Federal court is a powerful tool in our efforts to protect the Nation and must be among the options available to us. Any attempt to deprive the executive branch of that tool undermines our Nation's counterterrorism efforts and has the potential to harm our national security." Obama's order included provisions preventing the transfer of Guantánamo prisoners to other foreign countries, writing that requiring the executive branch to "certify to additional conditions would hinder the conduct of delicate negotiations with foreign countries and therefore the effort to conclude detainee transfers in accord with our national security." Obama signed the 2011 Defense Authorization Bill, but nevertheless the Obama administration "will work with the Congress to seek repeal of these restrictions, will seek to mitigate their effects, and will oppose any attempt to extend or expand them in the future," the president's statement said.

On 7 March 2011, Obama gave the green light to resume military trials, conducted by military officers, with a military judge presiding, of terror suspects detained at Guantánamo Bay. He also signed an executive order that requires a review of detainees' status "within a year and every four years after that to determine whether they remain a threat... [and] scheduled for a military trial or should be released." The order required compliance with the Geneva Conventions and the international treaty banning torture and inhumane treatment.

The delay of Guantánamo Bay's closing resulted in some controversy among the public. On 12 December 2011, The New York Times published an op-ed written by retired United States Marine Corps Generals Charles C. Krulak and Joseph P. Hoar. The two criticized how a provision of the National Defense Authorization Act for Fiscal Year 2012 (NDAA) would extend a ban on transfers from Guantánamo, "ensuring that this morally and financially expensive symbol of detainee abuse [would] remain open well into the future." Both argued the move would bolster Al Qaeda's recruiting efforts and make it "nearly impossible" to transfer 88 men (of the 171 held there) who had been cleared for release.

On 31 December, after signing NDAA, Obama voiced his concerns regarding certain provisions of the act including Section 1027, which "renews the bar against using appropriated funds for fiscal year 2012 to transfer Guantánamo detainees into the United States for any purpose." He continued to state opposition to the provision, which he argued "intrudes upon critical executive branch authority to determine when and where to prosecute Guantánamo detainees, based on the facts and the circumstances of each case and our national security interests. [...] Moreover, this intrusion would, under certain circumstances, violate constitutional separation of powers principles." Obama closed his concerns by stating his administration would "aggressively seek to mitigate those concerns through the design of implementation procedures and other authorities available to me as chief executive and Commander in Chief, will oppose any attempt to extend or expand them in the future, and will seek the repeal of any provisions that undermine the policies and values that have guided my Administration throughout my time in office."

In early July 2012, reports surfaced saying Guantánamo Bay was getting an estimated $40 million communications upgrade because the outdated satellite communications system was overburdened with the military court hearing the cases of war-on-terrorism suspects, as well as by the ongoing detention operations. These reports therefore indicated the US military was preparing for long-term operations at Guantánamo, but they were denied by Army Lt. Col. Todd Breasseale, a spokesman for the Guantánamo military commissions. He said the communications upgrade project is meant to serve the Guantanamo naval station rather than the detention camp, which Washington still "has plans" to close. On 3 July 2012, ABC News reported setbacks in Congress, as well as a need to focus on a stagnant economy in the United States, had made the issue of closing the detention camp a lesser priority. The channel also asked Obama if he planned on ever closing Guantanamo Bay, to which he replied he did.

Some blamed Congress for the delay in closing the detention camp, while others blamed the president. National Security Council spokesman Tommy Vietor said in a statement, "Obviously Congress has taken a number of steps to prevent the closure of the prison at Guantánamo Bay, but the President still believes it's in our national security interest and will keep trying". In the same interview, however, senior ACLU attorney Zachary Katznelson argued Obama had "enough control and power that he [could have gotten those] men out today if he [had] the political will to do so."

On 21 September 2012, the US government disclosed the names of 55 of the 86 prisoners cleared for transfer from Guantánamo Bay prison. All of the names publicized were those of prisoners that Obama's inter-agency Guantanamo Bay Review Task Force had approved for release from the prison. Previously, the government had maintained the names of prisoners cleared could not be made public because it would interfere with diplomatic efforts to repatriate or resettle prisoners in their home country or other countries.

In November 2012, the Senate voted 54–41 to prevent detainees from being transferred to the US. At the end of December 2013, President Obama stated he has not given up the idea of trying terror suspects housed at Guantanamo Bay in United States courts. "The executive branch must have the authority to determine when and where to prosecute Guantanamo detainees, based on the facts and circumstances of each case and our national security interests," Obama wrote in a signing statement attached to a new defense authorization bill called the National Defense Authorization Act for fiscal 2014 which relaxed restrictions on transferring detainees from the U.S. prison at Guantanamo Bay, Cuba, to the custody of foreign governments.

On 20 January 2015, during the 2015 State of the Union address, Obama stated Guantánamo Bay "is not who we are" and that it was "time to close Gitmo". A little less than a week later, The Huffington Post published an article by Tom Hayden arguing Guantánamo Bay would be best closed by returning the base to Cuban sovereignty, arguing it is "where [Guantánamo Bay] belongs historically."

On 4 November 2015, Obama stated that he was preparing to unveil a plan to close the camp and move some prisoners to US soil. The plan proposed one or more prisons from a working list that included facilities in Kansas, Colorado and South Carolina. Two others that were on the list, in California and Washington state, didn't appear to have made the preliminary cut.

On 23 February 2016, Obama stated that years after Congress disagreed to close the camp, it has come to a conclusion of closing the camp. The exact time frame of the camp closing was not revealed. At 23 February 2016, there were 91 prisoners in Guantánamo. From these 35 were recommended for transfer if security conditions could be met. The remaining prisoners were expected to be brought to U.S. facilities in the United States. If brought to the United States, some of those detainees would continue through military commissions; others might face trial in civilian courts. 13 potential facilities in the United States that might be used to house detainees were reviewed by the Obama administration, but their names were not revealed. This information was published because Congress had asked the administration to provide information about where and how the administration intended to hold existing and future detainees, if Guantanamo was closed. Obama's plan was rejected by several Republicans in Congress.

On 15 August 2016, 15 prisoners were transferred from the prison. Twelve Yemeni nationals and 3 Afghans were transferred to the United Arab Emirates, bringing the total number of prisoners to 61 with 20 more cleared for transfer. Obama did not close the prison before leaving office but had reduced the number of prisoners to 41.

In December 2024 The US. transferred two Malaysian detainees from Guantanamo Bay to Malaysia after they pleaded guilty to charges related to the 2002 Bali bombings and agreed to testify against the alleged ringleader. Additionally, a Kenyan detainee held for 17 years without charge was repatriated. These transfers come amid calls to end the detention of remaining Guantanamo prisoners and uncertainty over future policies.

=== President Trump's statements ===
President Donald Trump vowed to keep the prison open and to use it to detain terrorists, potentially including American supporters of ISIS. On 30 January 2018, just before delivering his State of the Union address, Trump signed an executive order to keep the prison open indefinitely.

=== President Biden's review ===
On 11 February 2021, US President Joe Biden announced a formal review of the camp, with a stated goal of closing it by the end of his term. At the time, there were 40 prisoners at the camp, most of whom had been held for nearly two decades without being charged or tried. By the end of his term, the number of prisoners had been reduced to 15.

== Media representations ==
External videos
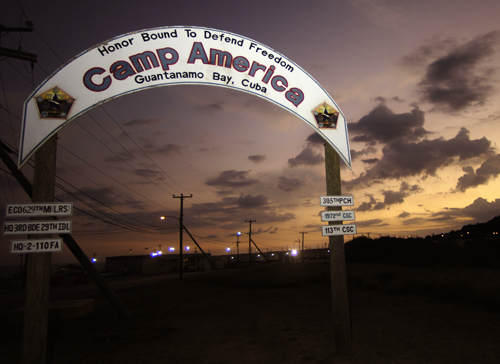
- Forever Prison, 14:25, 2017, Retro Report

- NCIS: "Minimum Security" (2003), NCIS is an American police procedural drama television series featuring agents from the Naval Criminal Investigative Service. The agents are investigating a case that involved in a possible terrorist plot concerning a prisoner at the camp and also a member of the family of Osama Bin Laden.
- Frontline: "The Torture Question" (2005), a PBS documentary that traces the history of how decisions made in Washington, D.C. in the immediate aftermath of September 11, 2001 led to a robust interrogation policy that laid the groundwork for prisoner abuse in Afghanistan, Guantánamo Bay, Cuba, and Iraq's Abu Ghraib prison.
- Gitmo – The New Rules of War (2006), a Swedish documentary by Erik Gandini and Tarik Saleh/ATMO that raises some of the issues concerning the nature of the interrogation processes, through interviews with previous Guantánamo and Abu Ghraib personnel; it has won several awards including 1st prize at the 2006 Seattle International Film Festival.
- Guantanamo – American Officer Tortures Prisoners and Murders Investigator in an Iranian TV Drama (2006), Iranian drama shown on Al-Kawthar TV and noted by the Middle East Media Research Institute
- Prisoner 345 (2006) details the case of Al Jazeera cameraman Sami Al Hajj, detained at the camp from 2001 to 2008.
- Guantanamo – unplugged (2006), a first-hand view of the prison facilities by Stephan Bachenheimer, winner of the International Video Journalism Award 2006, English/German
- The Road to Guantánamo (2006), a film about the Tipton Three
- Taxi to the Dark Side (2007), an in-depth look at the torture practices, focusing on Dilwar, an innocent taxi driver in Afghanistan who was tortured and killed in 2002
- Harold & Kumar Escape from Guantanamo Bay (2008), comedy film
- Witness to Guantanamo (2009), an ongoing project filming in-depth interviews with former detainees and other voices of Guantanamo, and creating a free archive of these stories for future generations
- Inside Guantanamo (2009), a National Geographic film of what it is like inside Guantanamo Bay
- New York (2009), an Indian movie about an Indian American Muslim being detained at the prison
- Outside the Law: Stories From Guantanamo (2009), a British documentary, featuring interviews with previous Guantánamo detainees, a former U.S. military chaplain at Guantánamo Bay and human rights organisations such as Cageprisoners Ltd.
- The Real News: "Protest Against Obama Guantanamo Policy" (16 January 2011)
- Shaker Aamer: A Decade of Injustice (2012), a short film by Spectacle to mark the 10th anniversary of the detention of Shaker Aamer at Guantanamo Bay.
- 5 Years (2013), Germany. Directed by: Stefan Schaller; screenplay: Stefan Schaller, David Finck; cinematography: Armin Franzen; cast: Sascha Alexander Gersak, Ben Miles, and others; 96 minutes; color; genre: thriller. The film is based on the autobiography of Murat Kurnaz, a German-Turkish man who was held unjustly in Guantanamo for five years.
- Camp X-Ray (2014), a film starring Kristen Stewart and Peyman Moaadi
- The Last Ship (2014) shows a naval ship USS Nathan James and her crew landing at Guantanamo Bay to retrieve medical supplies, fuel, and food. During the mission they are ambushed by prisoners who broke out after the virus began spreading.
- The animated series Ben 10: Ultimate Alien portrayed Area 51 as a prison for aliens. The episode that features this prison ("Prisoner Number 775 is Missing") was co-written by Dwayne McDuffie as an intentional reference to Guantanamo Bay, a subject that made him furious.
- The Mauritanian (2021), a film starring Jodie Foster, Tahar Rahim, Shailene Woodley, and Benedict Cumberbatch
- We Are Not Ghouls (2022), a documentary about Lieutenant-Colonel Yvonne Bradley's work to free Guantanamo Bay detainee Binyam Mohamed.
- Rabiye Kurnaz vs. George W. Bush (2022), Germany. Directed by Andreas Dresen; screenplay by Laila Stieler; cinematography by Andreas Höfer; starring Meltem Kaptan, Alexander Scheer among others; 118 minutes; color; genre: Drama. The film tells the story of Murat Kurnaz's mother and her fight against the American justice system to free her son from Guantanamo Bay.

=== Games ===
- In Tom Clancy's Splinter Cell: Blacklist (2013), the player is tasked with infiltrating and escaping from Guantanamo Bay
- In Metal Gear Solid V: Ground Zeroes (2014), overall gameplay includes one mission requiring the player to extract two prisoners from the fictional "Camp Omega", a stand-in for Guantanamo Bay, in early 1975
- In Devil's Third (2015), the protagonist is held in an underground section of Guantanamo Bay, later escaping during a riot

=== Literature ===
- Five Years of My Life: An Innocent Man in Guantanamo (2008), a memoir by Murat Kurnaz
- Prisonnier à Guantanamo (2008), by Mollah Abdul Salam Zaeef and Jean-Michel Caradec'h, memoirs of the ex-ambassador of Taliban government in Pakistan
- Guantanamo Diary: Mohamedou Ould Slahi edited by (Larry Siems) (2015), a memoir by a Guantanamo detainee
- American Poets Against the War (2008), an anthology edited by Christian Narkiewicz-Laine
- Guantanamo Naval Base by Alfred de Zayas in Max Planck Encyclopedia of Public International Law, edited by (Rüdiger Wolfrum) (2012), Oxford, pp. 632–637, ISBN 978-0-19-929168-7.
- Human Rights and Indefinite Detention (2005), by Alfred de Zayas in International Review of the Red Cross, ISSN: 1816-3831

=== Music ===
- "Ball and Chain," the debut song from The Who's album Who (2019)
- "A Base de Guantanamo (The Guantánamo Bay)," the sixth song of Caetano Veloso's album Zii e Zie (2009)
- The name of Jello Biafra and the Guantanamo School of Medicine, a punk rock band founded in 2008, refers to Guantanamo Bay.
- "Pame (Guantanamo)" (Let's go (Guantanamo)) is a song from Active Member, a hip hop group based in Greece.

=== Radio ===
- Camp Delta, Guantanamo (30 April 2006), a radio feature by Frank Smith
- "Habeas Schmabeas", an episode of the radio program This American Life produced by Chicago Public Radio, which discusses the conditions at the facility, the legal justifications and arguments surrounding the detention of prisoners there, and the history of the principle of habeas corpus; it also features interviews with two former detainees and won a 2006 Peabody Award
- On the Shore Dimly Seen (2015), a performance documentary based on the interrogation log of Guantanamo Bay detainee 063, by Gregory Whitehead
- Radiolab: "The Other Latif", a six-episode miniseries from Radiolab exploring the story of Abdul Latif Nasir, detainee 244 at Guantanamo who shares his name with Radiolab's Latif Nasser
- Serial Season 4: Guantánamo (2024) covers the history of the Guantanamo Bay detention camp through interviews with former guards, prisoners, translators and more.

=== Theater ===
- Good Morning Gitmo (2014), a one-act comedy play written by Mishu Hilmy and Eric Simon and originally produced by The Annoyance Theatre in Chicago
- Guantanamo 'Honor Bound to Defend Freedom', (2004) was first produced at the Tricycle Theatre in London in 2004.

== Artistic responses ==
- Banksy's Guantanamo Sculpture (2006), the graffiti artist Banksy placed a life-size replica of one of Guantanamo's detainees in a Disneyland attraction.
- Gone Gitmo (2009), a virtual reproduction of the Guantanamo Bay Prison built in Second Life by the artists Nonny de la Peña and Peggy Weil
- Guantanamo Bay Museum of Art and History (2012), a fictional museum created by the artist Ian Alan Paul that is premised on the idea that the museum has replaced the shuttered prison facility
- Guantanamo Bay Illustrations (2013), in 2013 the artist Molly Crabapple visited the Guantanamo Bay Detention Facilities and did a series of portraits and sketches of the detainees and the prison complex.

== See also ==
- Abu Ghraib prison
- Bagram Theater Internment Facility
- Bagram torture and prisoner abuse
- Belmarsh (HM Prison)—One of the UK's maximum security prisons, which was used to hold prisoners without charge or trial in the UK (many are wanted or convicted of terrorism in other countries) as recently as 2006; leading it to be referred to as the "British version of Guantánamo Bay"
- Camp 1391 – referred to as "the Israeli Guantanamo"
- Camp Delta Standard Operating Procedures (.pdf file) protocol of the U.S. Army at the Guantánamo Bay detention camp that was released by WikiLeaks
- Cellular Jail – A prison owned by the UK that was set up in 1906 for similar purposes as Guantánamo Bay; imprisoning Indian fighters in the Indian independence movement at that time
- Civilian internee
- Communication Management Unit so called "little Guantánamos"
- Custody and the Stammheim trial (Red Army Faction)
- Disarmed Enemy Forces
- Does 1-570 v. Bush
- Gitmo playlist, a loose collection of music used during interrogations in Guantanamo Bay
- Guantanamo detainees' medical care
- Guantanamo Bay detainee documents
- List of Guantanamo Bay detainees cleared for release in 2009
- Guantánamo Bay files leak
- Lists of former Guantanamo Bay detainees alleged to have returned to terrorism
- Meshal v. Higgenbotham, a U.S. federal lawsuit filed by the American Civil Liberties Union
- Military Police: Enemy Prisoners of War, Retained Personnel, Civilian Internees and Other Detainees
- Taxi to the Dark Side, a 2007 film about the 2002 killing of an Afghan taxi driver by American soldiers while being held in extrajudicial detention
- The Constitution is not a suicide pact

== Further reading/viewing ==
- David Glenn (2010). "The Record Keeper: Carol Rosenberg owns the Guantánamo beat". Columbia Journalism Review. 49 (4). Archived from the original on 24 June 2021.
- "THE GUANTANAMO GAP: CAN FOREIGN NATIONALS OBTAIN REDRESS FOR PROLONGED ARBITRARY DETENTION AND TORTURE SUFFERED OUTSIDE THE UNITED STATES?". California Western International Law Journal: 303–352. 2006.
- "Yasiin Bey (aka Mos Def) force fed under standard Guantánamo Bay procedure." The Guardian. Monday 8 July 2013. via YouTube—Video created by human rights organization Reprieve & directed by Asif Kapadia, shows Mos Def force fed according to procedure at Guantanamo Bay detention camp.

=== Declassified documents ===
- Office of the Secretary of Defense & Joint Staff FOIA Requester Service Center
  - Declassified Detainee Related Documents
- DOJ Office of Legal Counsel
  - OLC FOIA Reading Room
- FBI
  - 2004 Guantanamo Bay Special Inquiry
- DoD Inspector General
  - Publications
- DIA FOIA
  - Detainee abuse
- FOIA.gov
  - All related pdf files indexed by FOIA.gov
