= Does 1-570 v. Bush =

- Court: United States District Court for the District of Columbia
- Full case name: John Does 1-570 v. George W. Bush
- Docket nos.: 1:05-cv-00313

Court membership
- Judge sitting: Colleen Kollar-Kotelly

Does 1-570 v. Bush, No. 1:05-cv-00313, is a combined writ of habeas corpus submitted on behalf of detainees held in extrajudicial detention in the United States Guantanamo Bay detention camps, in Cuba.

== Background ==
Following the attacks of September 11th, 2001, the United States began an offensive known as the war on terror. A number of individuals suspected of terrorist ties or activities were held in Cuba at the Guantanamo Bay detention camps.

== Description ==
Several hundred of the detainees in Guantanamo had individual habeas corpus petitions filed on their behalf. When the lawyers working on the captives' behalf encountered difficulties with the Department of Defense over the captives' names, they filed this class action on behalf of all the detainees.
