= Supplemental Appropriations Act, 2009 =

The Supplemental Appropriations Act, 2009 (Pub. L. 111–32 (text) (PDF), H.R. 2346, enacted June 24, 2009) is a United States federal law appropriating public funds for spending in the Iraq War and Afghanistan War during the 2009 fiscal year.

The Obama administration vowed that this "war supplemental" will be the last of its kind, as war funding will be provided for in regular budget bills beginning in fiscal year 2010.

== Legislative history ==
The bill passed the U.S. House of Representatives, 368-60, on May 14, then passed the U.S. Senate with an amendment on May 21, 86-3. On June 16, the House approved the bill's final conference report (which includes a "cash for clunkers" provision tacked onto the supplemental war funding), 226-202, with Republicans mostly opposing the bill, and on June 18, the Senate followed up by a bipartisan vote, 91-5. On June 24, President Barack Obama signed the bill into law.
