= Guantanamo force feeding =

Practice at Guantanamo Bay prison

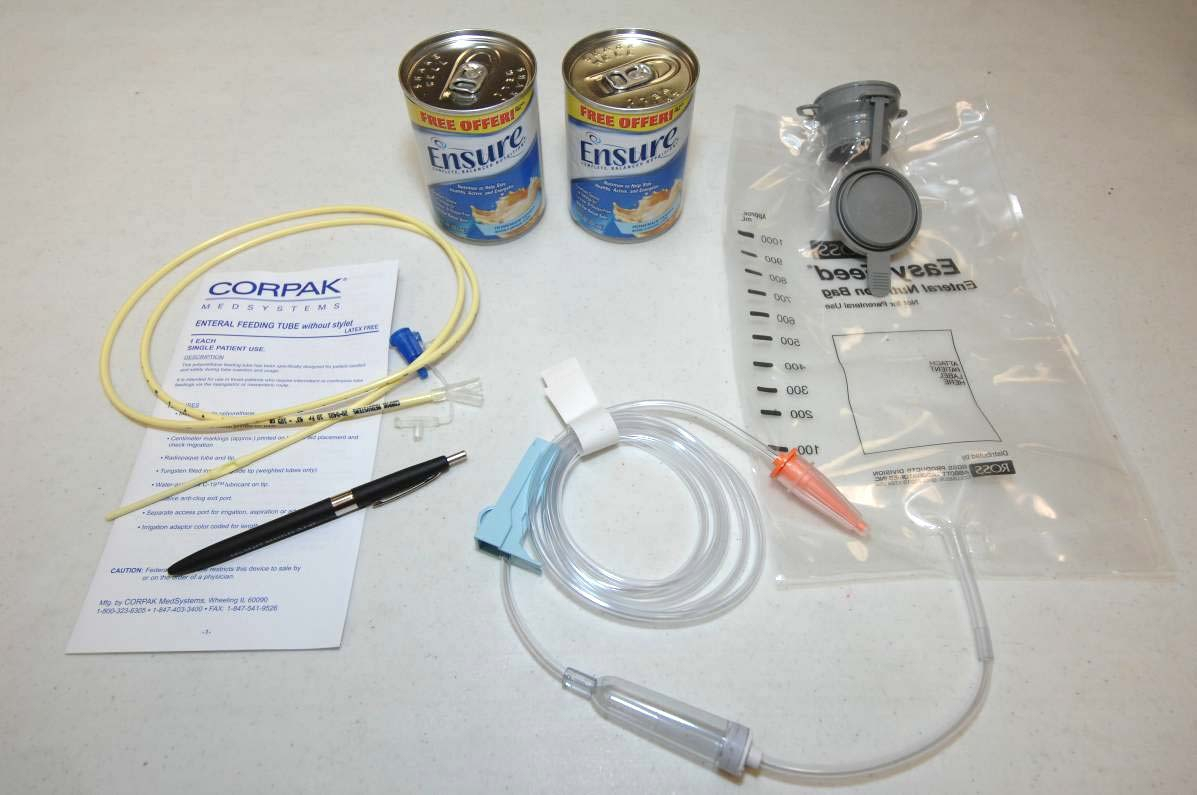
Nasal tubes, gravity feeding bags, and the liquid nutrient Ensure used in Guantanamo force feeding. For more illustrations, see

Detainees held in the United States' Guantanamo Bay detention camps have initiated both individual and widespread hunger strikes at Guantánamo Bay, and camp medical authorities have initiated force-feeding programs.

In 2005, Captain John Edmonson, who was then Naval Base's chief medical officer, asserted that force feeding was a last resort, used only when counseling failed, and when the detainee's body mass index fell below the healthy range. According to Edmonson detainees normally cooperated, and restraints were unnecessary. According to Edmonson detainees were normally only given 1500 Calories per day.

The UN Human Rights Commission said it regards force-feeding at Guantanamo as a form of torture and the World Medical Association specifically prohibited force-feeding in its Declaration of Tokyo.

Rapper Yasiin Bey, also known as Mos Def, volunteered for a demonstration with Reprieve based on the leaked documents of the procedure. Guantanamo medical personnel criticized the demonstration as false. One nurse said of the detainees, "Most are asking us to hurry up, make it go faster." A Guantanamo watch commander, and former fan, reacted by deleting Mos Def's music from his iPod.

== Medical concerns ==
More than 250 doctors from the UK, the US, Ireland, Germany, Australia, Italy and the Netherlands condemned the US for force-feeding of hunger strikes at Guantanamo Bay, Cuba. They said "We urge the US government to ensure that detainees are assessed by independent physicians and that techniques such as force-feeding and restraint chairs are abandoned," The doctors said also that the World Medical Association specifically prohibited force-feeding and they want the association to instigate disciplinary proceedings against any members known to have violated the code.

In 1975, the World Medical Association issued the Declaration of Tokyo, guidelines for physicians. The declaration states: "Where a prisoner refuses nourishment and is considered by the physician as capable of forming an unimpaired and rational judgement concerning the consequences of such a voluntary refusal of nourishment, he or she shall not be fed artificially."

== Torture Claims ==
Former prisoner Fouzi Khalid Abdullah Al Odah told the BBC in 2006 that force-feeding of hunger strikers in Guantanamo amounts to torture and the UN Human Rights Commission said it regards force-feeding at Guantanamo as a form of torture, a charge the US firmly has repeatedly denied.

On 1 March 2006, Richard G. Murphy Jr. and other lawyers for detainee Mohammad Bawazir filed a claim that force-feeding was torture. The lawyers claim that the military made the force-feeding process unnecessarily painful and humiliating to break a hunger strike that at one point included more than 100 detainees.

== History ==
The earliest known case of force-feeding detainees in Guantanamo Bay occurred in early 2002 when two hunger strikers were hospitalized for malnutrition. The pair were holdouts from a hunger strike which began as a response to Guantanamo guards removing a makeshift turban from one of the detainees. The strike initially had up to 194 participants, however that number dropped precipitously when the general in charge of the prison announced that detainees would be allowed to wear turbans. In these initial cases, detainees were sedated as opposed to restrained prior to being given nutrition. Restraints were used in force feeding at least as early as early 2005 in response to another hunger strike by detainees to protest prison conditions. In this case, 105 detainees were refusing food, although to varying extents. The military acknowledged that twenty detainees were being force fed. In these cases, many detainees passively accepted nasal feeding, though others were restrained with leg shackles and handcuffs.

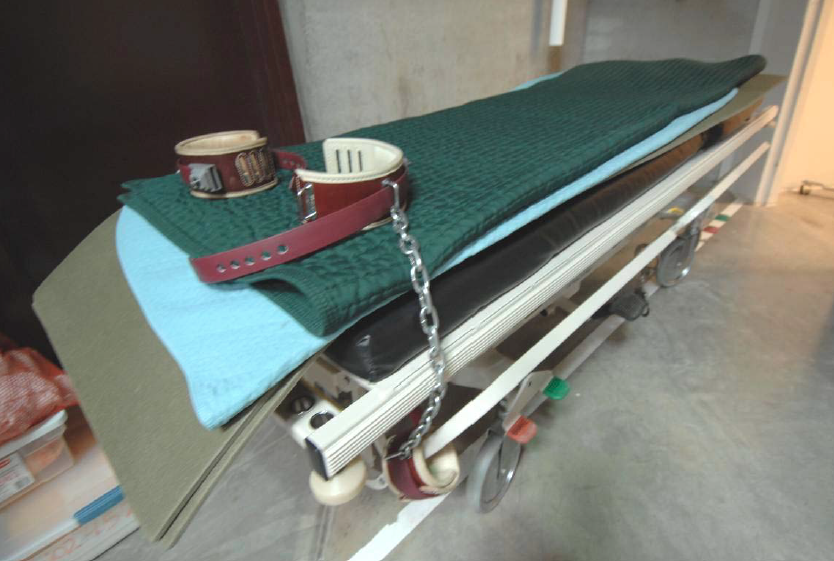
Gurney with leg restraints

== Practice ==
Though initially not used, the military began the use of restraint chairs for feeding hunger-striking detainees in December 2005 to prevent them from vomiting up forced nutrition.

== Litigation ==
In 2005, the United States District Court for the District of Columbia ordered the military to provide to detainees' attorneys: notice within 24 hours of the commencement of force feeding, the detainees' medical records, and weekly status updates about the detainees' health.

In 2013, hunger striker Jihad Ahmed Mustafa Dhiab sought an injunction in federal court to stop the government from force-feeding him. On 16 May 2014, Senior United States District Judge Gladys Kessler ordered the military to stop the force-feeding of the Syrian prisoner until his appointed hearing, scheduled for 21 May 2014. The judge has since authorized the force-feeding. In October 2014, District Judge Kessler determined that she had no jurisdiction over confinement conditions at Guantanamo. After the United States Court of Appeals for the District of Columbia Circuit rejected that theory, Dhiab again sought an injunction to stop the force feedings. In November 2014, District Judge Kessler again denied Dhiab relief.

However, in the course of discovery, the government disclosed that it had recorded its force-feedings of Dhiab and classified the videotapes as "SECRET". Sixteen news organizations intervened seeking access to the tapes of Dhiab being force fed. In October 2014, District Judge Kessler ordered the tapes unsealed.

The D.C. Circuit, in an unsigned opinion joined by Chief Circuit Judge Merrick Garland, determined it did not yet have jurisdiction over the interlocutory order but encouraged the district court to consider additional declarations made by the government. In December 2015, District Judge Kessler again ordered the tapes to be redacted and unsealed.

In March 2017, the D.C. Circuit ordered that the tapes remain secret, with the panel unanimously voting to reverse but with each of the three judges providing different reasons in separate opinions. Senior Judge A. Raymond Randolph argued that the press has no right to access classified court filings made by detainees petitioning for habeas corpus and that the lower court clearly erred by not deferring to declarations by Rear Admirals Kyle Cozad and Richard W. Butler asserting a national security threat. Judge Judith W. Rogers argued that the First Amendment to the United States Constitution provides the public a qualified right to access detainees' court filings but agreed that the government had identified a national security interest justifying secrecy. Senior Judge Stephen F. Williams also agreed that national security justified secrecy but questioned if the government could logically keep all Guantanamo filings secret.

== See also ==
- Fawzi al-Odah
- Sami al-Hajj
