= List of Syrian detainees at Guantanamo Bay =

The United States Department of Defense was holding a total of eleven Syrian detainees in Guantanamo. A total of 778 suspects have been held in the Guantanamo Bay detention camps, in Cuba since the camps opened on January 11, 2002, The camp population peaked in 2004 at approximately 660.

== Syrian detainees at Guantanamo ==
| isn | mug shot | name | arrival date | departure date | notes |
|---|---|---|---|---|---|
| 307 | | Abd Al Nasir Mohammed Abd Al Qadir Khantumani | 2002-02-11 | 2010-07-20 | Transferred to Cape Verde in July 2010. |
| 312 | | Muhammed Khan Tumani | 2002-02-11 | 2009-08-28 | Transferred to Portugal on 2009-08-28. |
| 317 | | Moammar Badawi Dokhan | 2002-02-12 | 2009-08-28 | Transferred to Portugal on 2009-08-28. |
| 326 | | Ahmed Adnan Ahjam | 2002-06-14 | 2014-12-07 | Released to Uruguay on December 7, 2014. |
| 327 | | Ali Husein Muhammad Shaaban | 2002-06-14 | 2014-12-07 | Released to Uruguay on December 7, 2014. |
| 329 | | Abd Al Hadi Omar Mahmoud Faraj | 2002-06-08 | 2014-12-07 | Released to Uruguay on December 7, 2014. |
| 330 | | Maasoum Abdah Mouhammad | 2002-06-10 | 2010-05-04 | Released to Bulgaria on May 4, 2010. |
| 489 | | Abd Al Rahim Abdul Rassak Janko | 2002-05-01 | | Transferred to Belgium. |
| 537 | | Mahmud Salem Horan Mohammed Mutlak Al Ali | | 2010-09-16 | Released to Germany on September 16, 2010. |
| 722 | | Jihad Ahmed Mujstafa Diyab aka Abu Wa'el Dhiab | 2002-08-05 | 2014-12-07 | Released to Uruguay on December 7, 2014. |
| 726 | | Menhal Al Henali | 2002-08-05 | 2004-03-31 | Fethi Boucetta was one of the 38 captives determined not to have been enemy combatants after all. |

== Wives ==
In 2008, Human Rights Watch reported:

On July 31, State Security, one of Syria's numerous security agencies, seized Yusra al-Husayn at her house and took her into detention. She is the wife of Jihad Diab, a detainee at the US military base at Guantanamo Bay.
