= Guantanamo Bay hunger strikes =

Series of protests by Guantanamo Bay detainees

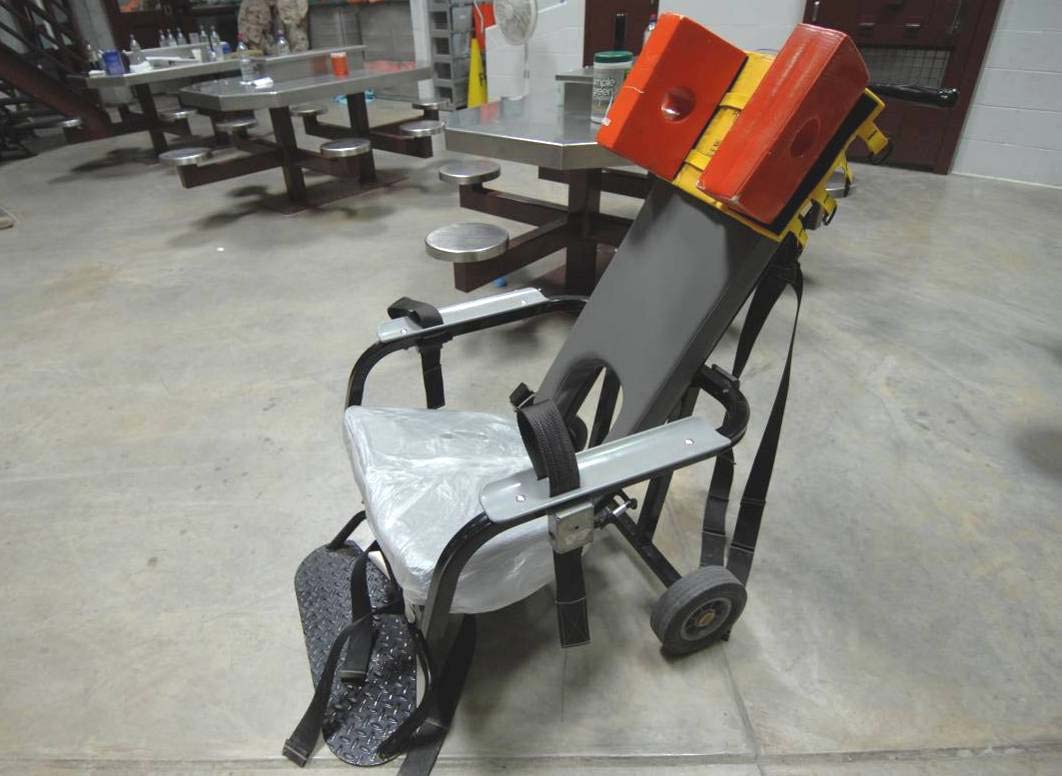
Captives who did not comply with force-feeding had their arms, legs, and head restrained in a feeding chair to prevent induced vomiting.

The Guantanamo Bay Hunger Strikes were a series of prisoner protests at the U.S. detention camp Guantanamo Bay in Cuba. The first hunger strikes began in 2002 when the camp first opened, but the secrecy of the camp's operations prevented news of those strikes from reaching the public. The first widely reported hunger strikes occurred in 2005.

== 2005 ==
After a hunger strike in July — the second that year — military officials permitted the existence of a prisoners' grievance committee for a few days. Then in August and September, lawyers reported that at least 200 prisoners went on hunger strike. Camp authorities acknowledged that 20 of them were being fed through nasal tubes at the camp's hospital and force-fed where necessary. Detainees were protesting the camp's conditions and their prolonged imprisonment without trial.

On December 25, 46 prisoners joined the 38 who were striking at the time, bringing the total number of people on hunger strike to 84.

== 2008 ==
In the April 14, 2008 edition of the New Yorker magazine, Jeffrey Toobin reported that there were about ten hunger strikers at Guantanamo. The overall population had declined markedly, as many detainees had been repatriated or transferred to detention in other countries.

As a result of the hunger strikes, the weight of at least eighty captives dropped to below 100 pounds (45 kg) each, as reported by Andy Worthington, the author of The Guantanamo Files. Human rights workers and physicians' professional associations have criticized the use of force-feeding on mentally competent patients at Guantanamo.

== 2013 ==
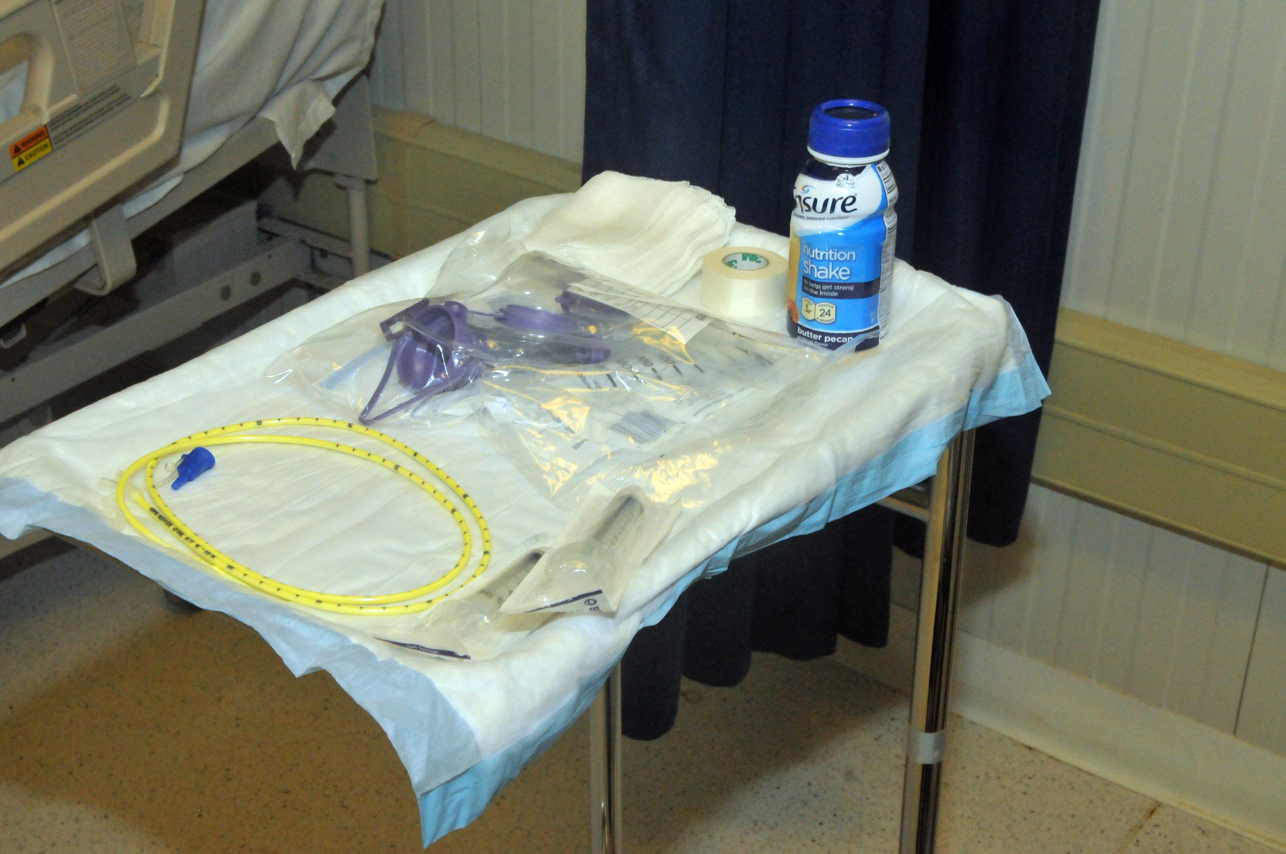
Force-feeding preparation (Guantanamo Bay, 2013)

A new wave of the hunger strike arose in early 2013. At its peak in July, 106 out of the 166 detainees were considered to be on hunger strike, with 45 of them being force-fed by the prison administration.

On December 4, 2013, the US military announced that it would no longer disclose information about the hunger strikes, explaining that, "The release of this information serves no operational purpose."

The last disclosed figures in December showed the number of hunger strikers had risen to 15, all of whom were force-fed.

== Dhiab litigation ==
In 2013, hunger striker Jihad Ahmed Mustafa Dhiab sought an injunction in the United States District Court for the District of Columbia to stop the government from force-feeding him. In October 2014, District Judge Gladys Kessler determined that she had no jurisdiction over confinement conditions at Guantanamo. After the United States Court of Appeals for the District of Columbia Circuit rejected that theory, Dhiab again sought an injunction to stop the force feedings. In November 2014, District Judge Kessler again denied Dhiab relief.

However, in the course of discovery, the government disclosed that it had recorded its force-feedings of Dhiab and classified the videotapes as "SECRET." Sixteen news organizations intervened, seeking access to the tapes. In October 2014, District Judge Kessler ordered to unseal the 28 tapes.

The D.C. Circuit, in an unsigned opinion joined by Chief Circuit Judge Merrick Garland, determined it did not yet have jurisdiction over the interlocutory order but encouraged the district court to consider additional declarations made by the government. In December 2015, District Judge Kessler again ordered the tapes to be redacted and unsealed.

In March 2017, the D.C. Circuit ordered that the tapes remain secret, with the panel unanimously voting to reverse but with each of the three judges providing different reasons in separate opinions. Senior Judge A. Raymond Randolph argued that the press has no right to access classified court filings made by prisoners petitioning for habeas corpus and that the lower court clearly erred by not deferring to declarations by Rear Admirals Kyle Cozad and Richard W. Butler asserting a national security threat. Judge Judith W. Rogers argued that the First Amendment to the United States Constitution provides the public a qualified right to access prisoners' court filings but agreed that the government had identified a national security interest justifying secrecy. Senior Judge Stephen F. Williams also agreed that national security justified secrecy but questioned if the government could logically keep all Guantanamo filings secret.
