= Mohammed Ali Bawazir =

Yemeni former Guantanamo Bay detainee (born 1980)

Muhammad Ali Abdallah Muhammad Bawazir
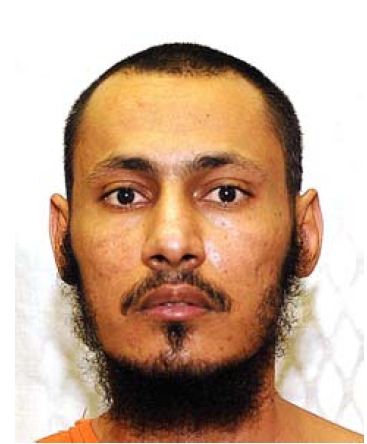
- Muhammad Ali Abdallah Muhammad Bwazir's official Guantanamo identity portrait, showing him wearing the white uniform issued to compliant individuals.
- Born: c. 1980 (age 45–46); Hawra', Yemen
- Citizenship: Yemen
- ISN: 440
- Charge: extrajudicial detention
- Status: released

Muhammad Ali Abdallah Muhammad Bawazir is a citizen of Yemen, once held in extrajudicial detention in the United States Guantanamo Bay detainment camps, in Cuba. Bawazir's Guantanamo Internment Serial Number was 440. American intelligence analysts estimate he was born in 1980, in Hawra', Yemen.

Bawazir arrived in Guantanamo on May 1, 2002.

In December 2015, unnamed officials leaked that Congress had been given notice that 17 individuals would be transferred from Guantanamo starting in thirty days. The US military planned to transfer the last three of those seventeen on January 21, 2016. Both his lawyers and military officials were surprised when Bawazir balked at the last moment, and declined repatriation.

On January 5, 2017, Bawazir and three other Yemeni men were transferred to Saudi Arabia.

== Hunger strike ==
The Washington Post reports that Bawazir's lawyers assert that Bawazir was one of those participating in the 2006 Guantanamo hunger strike, and that the new harsher procedures camp authorities instituted to break the hunger strike violated last fall's proscription on torture.

Camp authorities have been force-feeding hunger strikers. In January 2006, camp authorities started using "restraint chairs" to feed detainees.

The Center for Constitutional Rights quoted from the emergency injunction Bawazir's lawyers filed on his behalf, in reaction to what they described as the unnecessary violence of his force-feeding in the restraint chair:

- Forcibly strapped Mr. Bawazir into a restraint chair, tying his legs, arms, head, and midsection to the chair.
- Inserted of a feeding tube that was larger than the tube that had previously been left in Mr. Bawazir's nose, increasing the pain of the insertion and extraction.
- Poured four bottles of water into his stomach through the nasal gastric tube every time he was fed even though Mr. Bawazir has never refused to drink water by mouth.
- Restrained Mr. Bawazir in the chair for extended periods at each feeding.
- Denied Mr. Bawazir access to a toilet while he was restrained and then for an additional hour or more after he was released from the chair.
- Placed Mr. Bawazir in solitary confinement.

Medical records show Bawazir's weight had dropped to 97 pounds, during the 140 days of his hunger strike. Medical records show Bawazir was restrained in the chair longer than the manufacturer's directions.

Lieutenant Colonel Jeremy Martin asserted that the force-feedings were conducted humanely. He explained the extraordinary duration of the detainee's confinement to the restraint chair was due to the length of time the force-feeding took.

U.S. government lawyers argued that the bans on torture and cruel and unusual treatment didn't apply to captives in Guantánamo Bay. Justice Gladys Kessler called the allegations "extremely disturbing".

On February 11, 2009, US District Court judge Gladys Kessler declined to bar the use of restraint chairs for force-feeding Mohammed Ali Abdullah Bawazir and Omar Khamis Bin Hamdoon. Kessler has noted that Bawazir and Hamdoon's petition stated that the use of the restraint chair was "tantamount to torture". However, she stated the opinion that because she lacked the medical expertise to evaluate the position of the camp's medical authorities she lacked jurisdiction to rule on the petition.

According to the Agence France Presse, Bawazir and Hamdoon were not opposed to being force fed, and so claimed in their petition that the use of restraints was unnecessary. According to the Agence France Presse, camp authorities are withholding medical treatment for their other ailments from the hunger strikers, in an attempt to pressure them to quit their strike.

== Official status reviews ==
Originally, the Bush Presidency asserted that captives apprehended in the "war on terror" were not covered by the Geneva Conventions, and could be held indefinitely, without charge, and without an open and transparent review of the justifications for their detention. In 2004, the United States Supreme Court ruled, in Rasul v. Bush, that Guantanamo captives were entitled to being informed of the allegations justifying their detention, and were entitled to try to refute them.

=== Office for the Administrative Review of Detained Enemy Combatants ===
Combatant Status Review Tribunals were held in a 3x5 meter trailer where the captive sat with his hands and feet shackled to a bolt in the floor.

Following the Supreme Court's ruling, the Department of Defense set up the Office for the Administrative Review of Detained Enemy Combatants.

Scholars at the Brookings Institution, led by Benjamin Wittes, listed the captives still held in Guantanamo in December 2008, according to whether their detention was justified by certain common allegations:

- Mohammed Ali Abdullah Bawazir was listed as one of the captives who "The military alleges ... are associated with both Al Qaeda and the Taliban."
- Mohammed Ali Abdullah Bawazir was listed as one of the captives who "The military alleges ... traveled to Afghanistan for jihad."
- Mohammed Ali Abdullah Bawazir was listed as one of the captives who "The military alleges that the following detainees stayed in Al Qaeda, Taliban or other guest- or safehouses."
- Mohammed Ali Abdullah Bawazir was listed as one of the captives who "The military alleges ... took military or terrorist training in Afghanistan."
- Mohammed Ali Abdullah Bawazir was listed as one of the captives who "The military alleges ... fought for the Taliban."
- Mohammed Ali Abdullah Bawazir was listed as one of the captives who "The military alleges that the following detainees were captured under circumstances that strongly suggest belligerency."
- Mohammed Ali Abdullah Bawazir was listed as one of the captives who was a foreign fighter.
- Mohammed Ali Abdullah Bawazir was listed as one of the captives who "deny affiliation with Al Qaeda or the Taliban yet admit facts that, under the broad authority the laws of war give armed parties to detain the enemy, offer the government ample legal justification for its detention decisions."
- Mohammed Ali Abdullah Bawazir was listed as one of the eight captives who could not be fit into the Wittes team's other classifications.

=== habeas corpus ===
A habeas corpus petition was filed on Bwazir's behalf in 2005.

=== Formerly secret Joint Task Force Guantanamo assessment ===
On April 25, 2011, whistleblower organization WikiLeaks published formerly secret assessments drafted by Joint Task Force Guantanamo analysts. His 9-page Joint Task Force Guantanamo assessment was drafted on October 27, 2008. It was signed by camp commandant Rear Admiral David M. Thomas Jr. He recommended continued detention.
