= SNAP food restriction waivers =

Permits for US states to restrict food benefit coverage

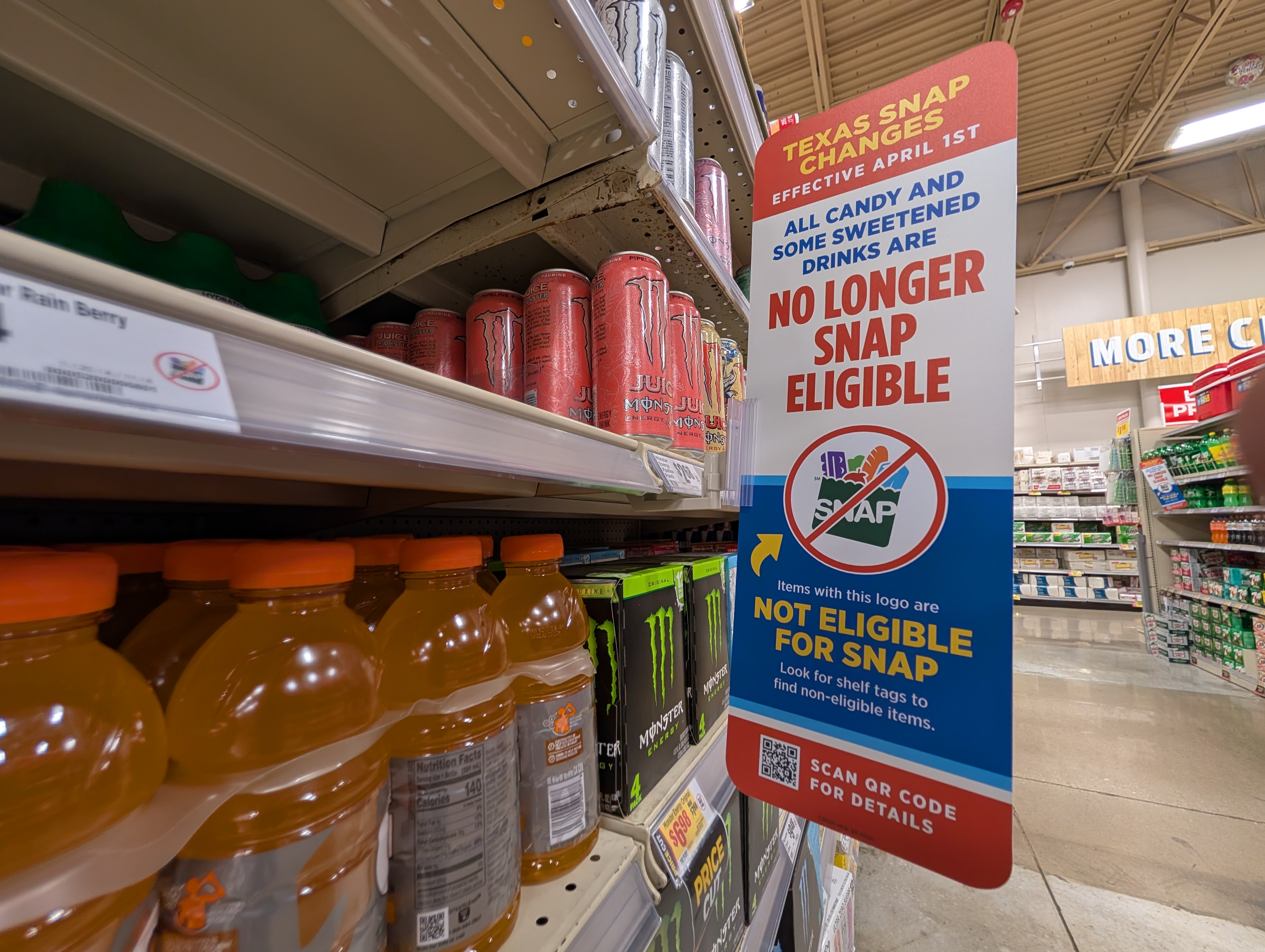
A sign in a H-E-B store indicating Texas SNAP restrictions on beverages and candy

SNAP food restriction waivers allow U.S. states to restrict what can be purchased with Supplemental Nutrition Assistance Program (SNAP) benefits. These waivers are approved by the U.S. Department of Agriculture's Food and Nutrition Service (FNS) and most include items such as soda and candy.

== Background ==
In 2025, the Trump administration encouraged governors to request waivers to limit the purchases of soda and processed food using SNAP benefits. Without states requesting waivers, such a restriction would need Congress.

== State waivers ==
The following states have received waivers:

State	Date requested	Date obtained	Targeted start date	SNAP coverage exemptions	Ref
Arkansas	April 2025	June 2025	July 1, 2026	Candy, soda, <50% natural fruit and vegetable juices, energy drinks, "unhealthy drinks"	
Colorado (Note: Currently blocked by ruling of the U.S. District Court for the District of Columbia. See Litigation.)	May 2025	August 4, 2025	October 30, 2026	Soft drinks	
Florida		August 4, 2025	April 20, 2026	Candy, soda, energy drinks, prepared desserts	
Hawaii			April 1, 2027	Soft drinks	
Idaho		June 2025	February 15, 2026	Candy, soda	
Indiana		May 2025	January 1, 2026	Candy, soft drinks	
Iowa		May 2025	January 1, 2026	"All taxable food items as defined by the Iowa Department of Revenue except food producing plants and seeds for food producing plants".	
Kansas			February 15, 2027	Candy, soft drinks	
Louisiana	May 2025	August 4, 2025	February 18, 2026	Candy, energy drinks, soft drinks	
Missouri	September 2025		February 15, 2027	Candy, prepared desserts, "unhealthy beverages"	
Montana			September 30, 2026	Candy, energy drinks, high-sugar beverages, prepared desserts	
Nebraska		May 2025	January 1, 2026	Soda, energy drinks, soft drinks, candy (from November 1, 2026)	
Nevada			February 1, 2028	Candy, sugar-sweetened beverages	
North Dakota			September 1, 2026	Candy, energy drinks, sweetened beverages	
Ohio			October 1, 2026	Fountain drinks, sugar-sweetened beverages	
Oklahoma	July 2025	August 2025	February 15, 2026	Candy, soft drinks	
South Carolina			August 31, 2026	Candy, energy drinks, soft drinks, sweetened beverages	
Tennessee			July 31, 2026	Processed foods and beverages, including candy, energy drinks, and soda	
Texas		August 4, 2025	April 1, 2026	Sweetened drinks and candy	
Utah		June 2025	January 1, 2026	Soft drinks	
Virginia			October 1, 2026	Sweetened beverages	
West Virginia		August 4, 2025	January 1, 2026	Soda	
Wyoming			February 1, 2027	Sweetened, carbonated beverages	

Mississippi requested a waiver in October 2025. In March 2026, Wisconsin enacted a law requiring itself to seek a federal waiver to prohibit Food Share (the Wisconsin SNAP program) benefits' use to purchase candy or soft drinks. As of June 2026, neither state has been granted a waiver according to the USDA's site.

== Policy debate ==
Anti-hunger advocates argue that research suggests SNAP users buy no more soda or junk food than other low-income Americans, and that banning those items can reduce choice and dignity for people receiving relatively small daily benefits ($6 a day) while creating stigmatization and confusion on the rules at checkout.

Trade associations representing grocery retailers and beverage manufacturers argue that such bans could be difficult and expensive to implement at the point of sale, and that the policy overstates the role of soft drinks in obesity compared to other factors.

Supporters of the waivers, including Trump administration officials and some public-health advocates, argue that excluding soda, candy and other sugary products would better align SNAP with the program's nutrition goals and could help reduce diet-related disease.

== Litigation ==
In March 2026, Reuters reported that five SNAP recipients sued USDA in federal court over the waivers. According to the lawsuit, the plaintiffs argued that the restrictions destabilized food access, created confusion at checkout, and exceeded USDA's legal authority. The suit sought to invalidate the approved waivers.

On June 22, 2026, U.S. District Judge Amy Berman Jackson ruled in favor of the plaintiffs and blocked the waivers in Colorado, Iowa, Nebraska, Tennessee, and West Virginia. Jackson held that USDA lacked authority to approve waivers that narrowed the statutory definition of "food" under SNAP, and that the agency failed to follow required administrative procedures, including public notice requirements for pilot projects with significant public impact.
