= Alka Pradhan =

Human rights attorney

Alka Pradhan is an American human rights attorney who has represented Guantanamo Bay detainees, civilian drone strike victims, and other torture victims. She currently works for the U.S. Department of Defense, Military Commissions Defense Organization and represents Ammar al-Baluchi in the case of United States v. Khalid Sheikh Mohammed. Pradhan also works as a defence attorney at the International Criminal Court. She is an adjunct professor at Penn Carey Law School and a faculty affiliate at the Rutgers Law School Center for Security, Race, and Rights.

Alka Pradhan at the International Criminal Court

== Early life and education ==
Pradhan received a BA from Johns Hopkins University, an MA from the Johns Hopkins School of Advanced International Studies, a JD from Columbia Law School, and an LLM from the London School of Economics.

== Career ==
Pradhan is considered an expert on comparative democracy and the rule of law, the interaction between the law of war and human rights law; the prohibition on torture; and the impact of coerced evidence on fair trials.

=== Guantanamo Bay ===
Pradhan was formerly an attorney at Reprieve. In 2014, her team sued the U.S. government over force-feeding techniques used on detainees at Guantanamo Bay.

Pradhan has worked with members of the UK Parliament and European Parliament on torture investigations. She was a speaker for the "Complicity and Counterterrorism" series sponsored by an All-Party Parliamentary Group on Renditions in 2017.

In 2017, Pradhan led al-Baluchi's case before the UN Working Group of Arbitrary Detention. The Working Group determined that al-Baluchi was being subjected to arbitrary detention by the United States government, and recommended his immediate release.

In April 2025, Pradhan and her legal team obtained a win for al-Baluchi when a military judge excluded government evidence from his Guantanamo Bay military commission as torture-acquired. The provenance of the evidence had been litigated for nearly seven years prior to the ruling. Pradhan stated that the ruling was "a reminder to the United States that governments that commit crimes must be held accountable."

=== Drone strike victim representation ===
As counsel at Reprieve, Pradhan represented civilian drone strike victims from Yemen and Pakistan, including the Rehman family from Waziristan, and the family of Salem bin Ali Jaber from eastern Yemen.

=== International Criminal Court ===
In 2021, Pradhan joined the defence team of Al-Hassan Ag Abdoul Aziz Ag Mohamed Ag Mahmoud before the International Criminal Court. Evidence against Al-Hassan is alleged to have been tainted by his torture in Mali.

In 2025, Pradhan and co-author Benjamin Farley won honorable mention for the Lieber Prize from the American Society of International Law for their paper entitled "Establishing a Practical Test for the End of Non-International Armed Conflict."

=== Korea Democracy Foundation ===
Pradhan was named a Global Democracy Goodwill Ambassador by the Korea Democracy Foundation from 2025-2027, following several years of collaboration. Pradhan attended the opening of National Museum of Korean Democracy in Seoul in June 2025, and delivered remarks on the importance of preserving memory in democracies. As KDF Ambassador, she met with celebrated Korean author Hwang Sokyong to discuss parallels between the decades of dictatorship in South Korea and democratic backsliding in America and Europe. She spoke again in Seoul in 2026 on the topic of comparative democratic challenges following attempted coups in Brazil, South Korea, and the United States.

=== Media Appearances ===
Pradhan appeared in the 2019 documentary The Long Haul, about the life and career of human rights lawyer Professor Sir Nigel Rodley.

Pradhan was one of the subjects of the 2019 Field of Vision documentary The Trial, about the Guantanamo Bay military commissions. Pradhan frequently speaks publicly about the impact of the CIA torture program on the detainees at Guantanamo and the lack of accountability for CIA and Bush administration officials who authorized torture.

In a 2019 interview with Christiane Amanpour, Pradhan stated that detainee torture "is the nasty center of this entire endeavour of the military commissions at Guantanamo." She has also stated regarding Ammar al-Baluchi's prosecution that "I don't think that there is any real evidence the government has at this point that is not tainted by his torture."

The 2020 graphic novel Guantanamo Voices by Sarah Mirk featured a chapter on Pradhan, illustrated by Tracy Chahwan. The same year, Pradhan was included on a list of "DC Rising Stars: 40 Under 40."

In May 2026, Pradhan delivered the annual Ashis and Uma Nandy Lecture at UC San Diego, entitled "Worst of the Worst: The Long War on Rights."

Time Magazine profiled Pradhan as part of their 2026 special edition, "How 9/11 Shaped My Life," issued for the 25th anniversary of the 9/11 terrorist attacks.

== Professional affiliations ==
Pradhan is a former Co-Chair of the Human Rights Law Committee of the International Bar Association. She is currently Co-Vice Chair of the IBA's Rule of Law Forum. In association with the IBA, Pradhan has run two webinar series on the rule of law, advocated for a Torture-Free Trade Treaty, and contributed to a study of the nuclear legacy of the Marshall Islands and potential related human rights litigation. Pradhan is also a member of the Board of Directors of the International Law Students Association. Pradhan was a member of the Drafting Group for the Principles on Effective Interviewing for Investigations and Information-Gathering, often referred to as the "Méndez Principles" to honor the former UN Special Rapporteur on torture and other cruel, inhuman or degrading treatment or punishment, Juan E. Méndez.
