= Jihad Ahmed Mustafa Dhiab =

United States' Guantanamo Bay detention camp detainee

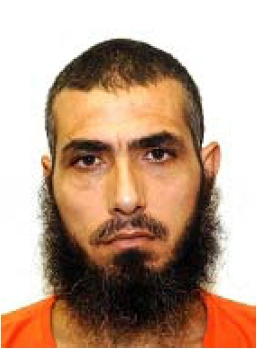
- Jihad Dhiab's official Guantanamo identity portrait, showing him wearing the orange uniform issued to noncompliant individuals
- Born: July 10, 1971 (age 55); Jedeta, Lebanon
- Arrested: November 2001; Pakistan
- Citizenship: Syrian
- Detained at: Guantanamo
- ISN: 722
- Charge(s): No charge, held in extrajudicial detention
- Status: granted asylum in Uruguay, current location: Unknown.

Jihad Ahmed Mustafa Dhiab also known as Abu Wa'el Dhiab was born in Lebanon on July 10, 1971. He was held in extrajudicial detention in the United States' Guantanamo Bay detention camp, in Cuba until he was released to Uruguay. His Guantanamo Internment Serial Number was 722. Dhiab was one of the Guantanamo hunger strikers.

He, along with five other Guantanamo prisoners, was granted asylum by Uruguay in exchange for a trade agreement to allow Uruguay to sell oranges to the US. On December 7, 2014, he was released to Uruguay.

== Capture ==
Dhiab was captured in Lahore, Pakistan, in 2002, and taken to the United States' Guantanamo Bay detention camp, in Cuba. While U.S. officials stated that he had links to militants, he was never charged. Dhiab spent 12 years at the facility, where he went on hunger strikes to protest his detention.

=== Wife ===
His wife, Yusra al-Hussein, was apprehended and held in extrajudicial detention in Syria in July 2008. Amnesty International reports she was released on July 22, 2009.

== Official status reviews ==
Originally the Bush Presidency asserted that captives apprehended in the "war on terror" were not covered by the Geneva Conventions, and could be held indefinitely, without charge, and without an open and transparent review of the justifications for their detention. In 2004 the United States Supreme Court ruled, in Rasul v. Bush, that Guantanamo captives were entitled to being informed of the allegations justifying their detention, and were entitled to try to refute them.

=== Office for the Administrative Review of Detained Enemy Combatants ===
Combatant Status Review Tribunals were held in a 3x5 meter trailer where the captive sat with his hands and feet shackled to a bolt in the floor.

Following the Supreme Court's ruling the Department of Defense set up the Office for the Administrative Review of Detained Enemy Combatants.

A Summary of Evidence memo was prepared for his Combatant Status Review Tribunal on 2004-09-25. The memo listed nine allegations:

The Summary of Evidence memos prepared for his 2005, 2006, 2007 and 2008 Administrative Review Board hearings have been published. Among the allegations he faced were:

- that he had hosted Abu Musab Al Zarqawi to stay in his house;
- that he was an expert forger;
- that he was a member of Asbat Al Ansar;
- that he had wanted to attend the Khalden training camp, but attended the Khandahar airport camp instead;
- some senior al Qaida members resented his assumption that he could attend an al Qaida camp without being vetted;
- some senior al Qaida members were suspicious of him because of his ties to takfiris;

=== Habeas corpus petition ===
Dhiab had a writ of habeas corpus petition filed on his behalf. The Military Commissions Act of 2006 mandated that Guantanamo captives were no longer entitled to access the US civil justice system, so all outstanding habeas corpus petitions were stayed. On June 12, 2008, the United States Supreme Court ruled, in Boumediene v. Bush, that the Military Commissions Act could not remove the right for Guantanamo captives to access the US Federal Court system. And all previous Guantanamo captives' habeas petitions were eligible to be re-instated. The judges considering the captives' habeas petitions would be considering whether the evidence used to compile the allegations the men and boys were enemy combatants justified a classification of "enemy combatant".

=== Formerly secret Joint Task Force Guantanamo assessment ===
On April 25, 2011, whistleblower organization WikiLeaks published formerly secret assessments drafted by Joint Task Force Guantanamo analysts. His Joint Task Force Guantanamo assessment was drafted on April 21, 2008.

=== Hunger strike lawsuit ===
In 2009 the U.S. government cleared Dhiab for release. He was ultimately released in December 2014. During the interim years, Dhiab protested his continued detention by going on hunger strike, in response to which the government subjected Dhiab to forced cell extractions and force-feeding techniques.

In 2013, Dhiab, represented by Alka Pradhan and the human rights organization Reprieve, sought an injunction in the United States District Court for the District of Columbia to stop the government from force-feeding him. In October 2014, District Judge Gladys Kessler determined that she had no jurisdiction over confinement conditions at Guantanamo. After the United States Court of Appeals for the District of Columbia Circuit rejected that theory, Dhiab again sought an injunction to stop the force feedings. In November 2014, District Judge Kessler again denied Dhiab relief.

However, in the course of discovery, the government disclosed that it had recorded itself force-feeding Dhiab and classified the videotapes as "SECRET". Sixteen news organizations intervened seeking access to the tapes of Dhiab being force-fed. In October 2014, District Judge Kessler ordered the tapes unsealed.

The D.C. Circuit, in an unsigned opinion joined by Chief Circuit Judge Merrick Garland, determined it did not yet have jurisdiction over the interlocutory order but encouraged the district court to consider additional declarations made by the government. In December 2015, District Judge Kessler again ordered the tapes to be redacted and unsealed.

In March 2017, the D.C. Circuit ordered that the tapes remain secret, with the panel unanimously voting to reverse but with each of the three judges providing different reasons in separate opinions. Senior Judge A. Raymond Randolph argued that the press has no right to access classified court filings made by prisoners petitioning for habeas corpus and that the lower court clearly erred by not deferring to declarations by Rear Admirals Kyle Cozad and Richard W. Butler asserting a national security threat. Judge Judith W. Rogers argued that the First Amendment to the United States Constitution provides the public a qualified right to access prisoners' court filings but agreed that the government had identified a national security interest justifying secrecy. Senior Judge Stephen F. Williams also agreed that national security justified secrecy but questioned if the government could logically keep all Guantanamo filings secret.

== Release and post-release activities ==
On December 7, 2014, he was released to Uruguay where he, and two other former Guantanamo detainees, struggled to adjust.

On June 18, 2016, it was reported that his location was unknown.

On July 1, 2016, a representative for the Colombia-based Avianca Airlines in São Paulo, Brazil confirmed that an alert had been issued to internal employees asking employees to be on the lookout and report any sightings of Dhiab.

He went to the Uruguayan Embassy in Caracas, Venezuela and asked the Uruguayan government to help him go to Turkey to be with his family and stated he did not want to return to Uruguay. He was arrested in Caracas, Venezuela on July 26, 2016.

Unhappy with his circumstances, Dhiab said he would go on a hunger strike. On September 9, 2016, it was reported that Dhiab was on a hunger strike at his apartment in Montevideo, Uruguay and that his health was deteriorating. An Uruguayan official stated they were trying to find "another country to take Dhiab". On September 14, 2016, a doctor in Uruguay stated that Abu Wa'el Dhiab "was unconscious" and had slipped into a coma due to a prolonged hunger strike and that it was hard to tell if "it was reversible". He was given medical treatment, came out of the coma, then continued his hunger strike.

On December 17, 2016, he was deported to Uruguay from South Africa after trying to enter this country as a tourist.

On July 24, 2017, he was once again deported to Uruguay from Morocco. He entered Morocco with a false Tunisian passport, once more he stated that he wanted to join his family in Turkey.

In early 2018, a business owner made allegations against Dhiab saying he was associated with ISIS. and Dhiab made accusations in return the business owner had stolen property from him valued at US$35,000.

In June 2018, he again left Uruguay for Turkey and it was unclear if Turkey had deported him.
