= Hawra =

Hawra can refer to:

- Hawra a place in Eritrea located at 14.483883°N 41.307793°E
- Hawra', a town in Yemen
- Hawara, an Egyptian archaeological site
- Houri, women in paradise in Islam
