= Malcolm Richard Wilkey =

American judge (1918–2009)

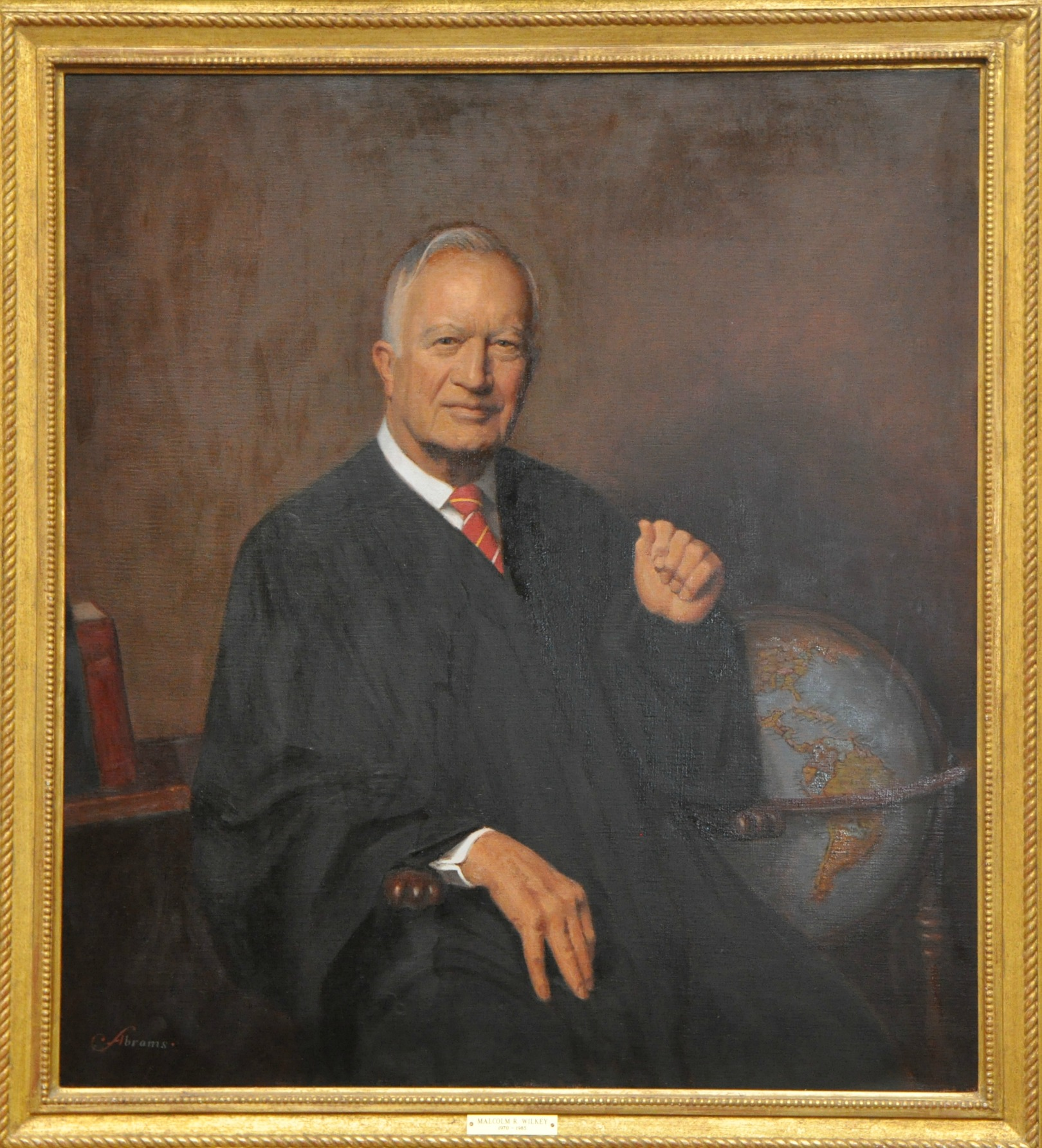

United States Ambassador to Uruguay
- In office November 28, 1985 – May 10, 1990
- President: Ronald Reagan; George H. W. Bush
- Preceded by: Thomas Aranda
- Succeeded by: Richard C. Brown

Senior Judge of the United States Court of Appeals for the District of Columbia Circuit
- In office December 6, 1984 – November 8, 1985

Judge of the United States Court of Appeals for the District of Columbia Circuit
- In office February 25, 1970 – December 6, 1984
- Appointed by: Richard Nixon
- Preceded by: Warren E. Burger
- Succeeded by: Stephen F. Williams

United States Assistant Attorney General for the Criminal Division
- In office 1959–1961
- President: Dwight D. Eisenhower
- Preceded by: Malcom Anderson
- Succeeded by: Herbert Miller

United States Assistant Attorney General for Legal Counsel
- In office 1958–1959
- President: Dwight D. Eisenhower
- Preceded by: W. Wilson White
- Succeeded by: Robert Kramer

United States Attorney for the Southern District of Texas
- In office 1954–1958
- Appointed by: Dwight D. Eisenhower
- Preceded by: Brian Odem
- Succeeded by: William Butler

Personal details
- Born: Malcolm Richard Wilkey; December 6, 1918 Murfreesboro, Tennessee, U.S.
- Died: August 15, 2009 (aged 90) Santiago, Chile
- Party: Republican
- Education: Harvard University (BA, LLB)

Malcolm Richard Wilkey (December 6, 1918 – August 15, 2009) was a United States circuit judge of the United States Court of Appeals for the District of Columbia Circuit and United States Ambassador to Uruguay.

== Early life and education ==
Wilkey was born in Murfreesboro, Tennessee and raised in Madisonville, Kentucky. He received an Artium Baccalaureus degree from Harvard University in 1940, and served in the United States Army during World War II in George S. Patton's Third Army from 1941 to 1945 (he left active duty as a Major and served in the United States Army Reserve until 1953, when he left as a Lieutenant Colonel). After the war he enrolled in law school and received a Bachelor of Laws from Harvard Law School in 1948.

== Career ==
=== Early career ===
Wilkey's official portrait at the Department of Justice

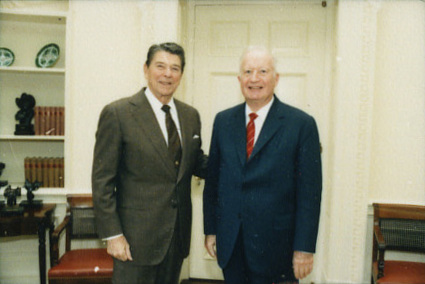
Wilkey with President Ronald Reagan in 1986

Wilkey was in private practice in Houston, Texas, from 1948 to 1954, also teaching at the University of Houston Law Center from 1949 to 1954. Wilkey entered public service in Texas as the United States Attorney for the Southern District of Texas (1954–1958). In 1958 he moved to Washington, D.C., to serve as the United States Assistant Attorney General of the Office of Legal Counsel at the United States Department of Justice (1958–1959), and Assistant Attorney General of the Criminal Division (1959–1961). He returned to private practice in Texas (1961–1963), before moving on to become the General counsel and secretary of Kennecott Copper Corporation (1963–1970), during which he was also a member of the Advisory Panel on International Law for the legal adviser at the United States Department of State (1969–1973).

=== Federal judicial service ===
Wilkey was nominated by President Richard Nixon on February 16, 1970, for the seat vacated by Judge Warren E. Burger on the United States Court of Appeals for the District of Columbia Circuit. He was confirmed by the United States Senate on February 24, 1970, and received his commission the following day. He assumed senior status on December 6, 1984, and his judicial service ended November 8, 1985, when he retired and went to Cambridge University as a visiting fellow of Wolfson College.

=== Political appointments ===
In 1989 he was chairman of the President's Commission on Federal Ethics Law Reform and worked alongside his Vice Chairman Griffin Bell, who was the United States Attorney General under President Jimmy Carter.

President Ronald Reagan appointed him United States Ambassador to Uruguay in 1985, and President George H. W. Bush continued him in that post until his retirement in 1990.

In 1992 United States Attorney General William Barr appointed him to determine whether federal criminal violations had taken place in the House banking scandal.

== Personal life ==
Wilkey married Chilean-born Emma A. Secul Depolo in 1959. He and his wife moved to Santiago, Chile, in 1990. Wilkey died from complications of prostate cancer at his home in Santiago on August 15, 2009.

== Writings ==
- Wilkey, Malcolm Richard (2003). As the twig is bent, or, Did I see the best of America. Philadelphia: Xlibris. ISBN 1-4134-1139-8.
- Wilkey, Malcolm Richard (1995). Roger Clegg (ed.). Is it time for a second Constitutional Convention? (Paperback ed.). Washington, D.C.: National Legal Center for the Public Interest. ISBN 0-937299-40-5.
- Wilkey, Malcolm Richard (1982). Enforcing the Fourth Amendment by alternatives to the exclusionary rule. Orrin G. Hatch (introduction). Washington, D.C.: National Legal Center for the Public Interest.

Legal offices
Preceded by Warren E. Burger	Judge of the United States Court of Appeals for the District of Columbia Circuit; 1970–1984	Succeeded by Stephen F. Williams
Diplomatic posts
Preceded by Thomas Aranda	United States Ambassador to Uruguay; 1985–1990	Succeeded by Richard C. Brown
