= National Museum of Korean Democracy =

Coordinates: 37°32′28″N 126°58′18″E

- 민주화운동기념관
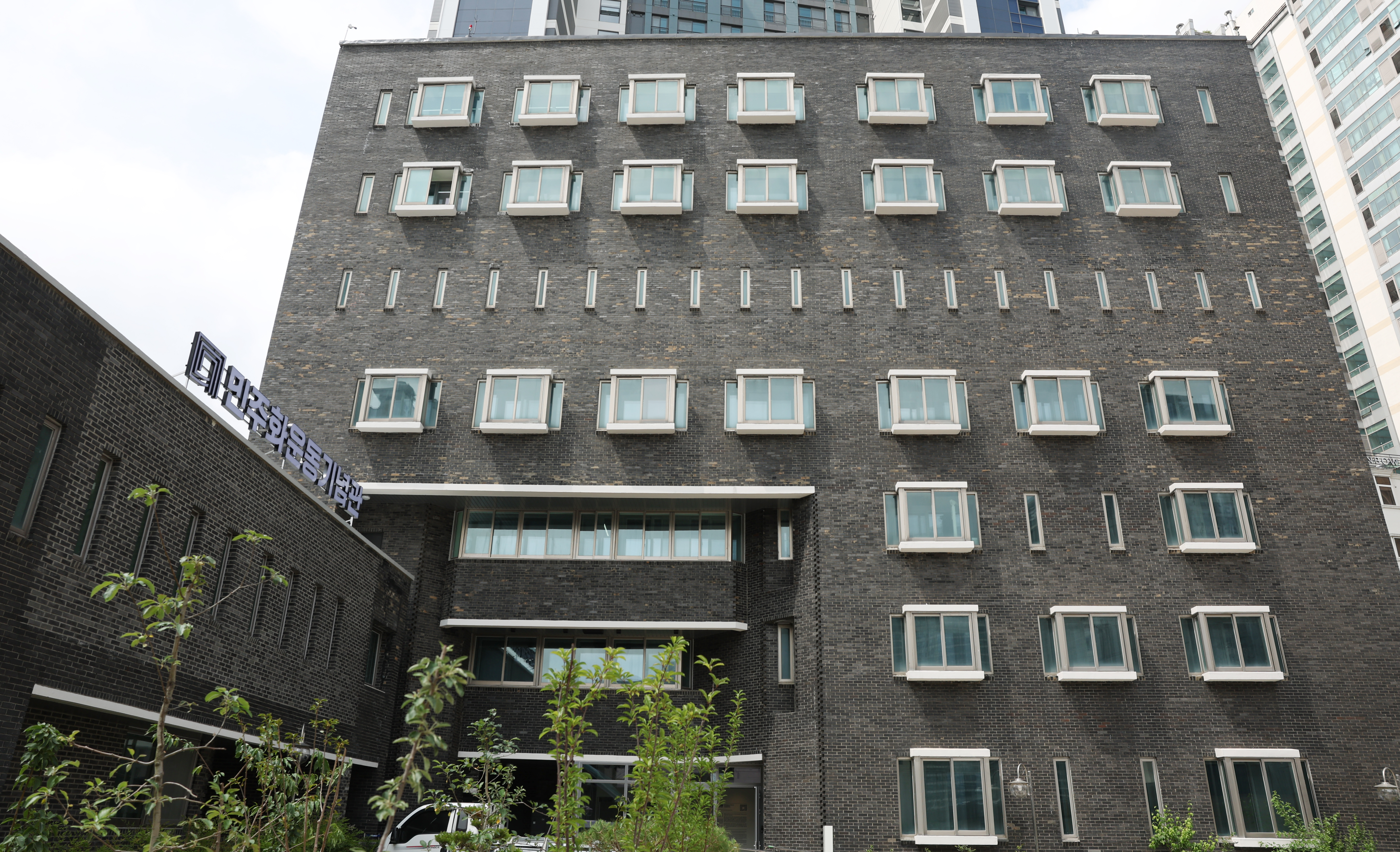
- Interactive map of the National Museum of Korean Democracy area
- Former names: Anti-Communist Interrogation Office
- Alternative names: International Oceanic Research Institute

General information
- Location: 37, Hangang-daero 71-gil, Yongsan-gu Namyeong Station, Seoul, South Korea
- Year built: 1976, 1983, 2018-2025

Design and construction
- Architect: Kim Swoo-geun

The National Museum of Korean Democracy (Korean: 민주화운동기념관) is a museum in Namyeong-dong, Seoul, South Korea.

The National Museum of Korean Democracy was initially built in 1976 as the "Nam young-dong Anti-Communist Interrogation Office" for the police department by the architect Kim Swoo-geun. It functioned as a torture chamber for over a decade until the June Democratic Struggle, and was transformed into a Human Rights Center in 2005. Ownership of the property was transferred to the Korean Democracy Foundation in 2018, which then converted the building into a museum for democracy and human rights.

The building is seven stories tall and made of black bricks. The fifth floor, marked by a row of slitted windows, houses the majority of the interrogation spaced where suspects were confined and tortured. The space now recreates the arrangements for viewing by visitors to the museum.

== History ==
The National Museum of Korean Democracy was originally constructed in 1976 as the Namyeong-dong Anti-Communist Interrogation Office. A second construction project in 1983 expanded the building from five stories to seven. Disguised by a sign reading "International Oceanic Research Institute," it was used by police as a space to detain and interrogate pro-democracy protestors and activists, often using torture methods such as electric shock or waterboarding. One survivor attested that torturers forced used socks filled with red pepper flakes up their nose, causing them to faint repeatedly. It is estimated that over 400 people were tortured in this building.

The most well known of the victims in the anti-communist interrogation office was 22-year old Park Jong-chul, a student activist at Seoul National University, who died of a crushed esophagus during water torture. Park's violent and untimely death sparked a wave of organized movements across South Korea that culminated in the June Democratic Struggle and democratic reform.

Following the end of the authoritarian regime, many of the police officers and torturers faced prosecution, but the torture office remained in the hands of the police. In 2005, it was turned into the police force's Human Rights Center, and was even the set for the films National Security (2012) and 1987: When the Day Comes. In December 2018 former President Moon Jae-in instructed it to be handed over to the Korean Democracy Foundation and converted into a museum and memorial hall. The National Museum of Korean Democracy officially opened on June 10, 2025.

Access to the museum is open to the public, but in order to enter the recreated interrogation facility, visitors to the museum have to book tickets in advance. Children under the age of 12 must be accompanied by a guardian, and children under the age of 6 are prohibited from entering.

== Architecture ==
The Namyeong-dong Anti-Communist Interrogation Office was the work of distinguished Korean architect Kim Swoo-geun. Kim was acquainted with KCIA director and prime minister Kim Jong-pil and had received some commissions from him. Kim Swoo-geun's style of architecture mostly aligned with the ideology of the authoritarian regime of the time, drawing from the spacial aesthetics of traditional korean buildings and the modern technological influences of Le Corbusier and Japanese modernists.

The visible exterior of the building is made of black brick and used to be encircled by a wall topped with barbed wire, imposing itself on the surrounding urban neighborhood. The building was intentionally designed for torture and isolation. The fifth floor was connected to the first floor by a narrow spiral staircase meant to confuse and disorient those being brought in for interrogation. Doorways into the interrogation rooms on the fifth floor are staggered to prevent contact between detainees. The windows in the interrogation rooms, which can be seen from the outside, are so thin that a human could not fit through, stopping any attempts at escape or suicide. Rooms were soundproofed so sounds of torture could not be heard from outside, but could be heard by prisoners in adjacent rooms. Even the reddish orange tiles on the walls were made to look blood-stained under the harsh lighting, and some survivors testified that the colors "triggered intense fear." While some attribute the twisted layout of the space to the architect, others argue that Kim was unaware of the purpose of the building and only contributed to the facade of the building.

Now, the KDF has restored the space to recreate the original conditions the victims were subject to in the 1970s and 1980s using testimony from former staff. Only cell 509 remains unaltered, preserved as a memorial to Park Jong-chul, who died in that very room.
