= A. Raymond Randolph =

American federal judge (born 1943)

Raymond Randolph
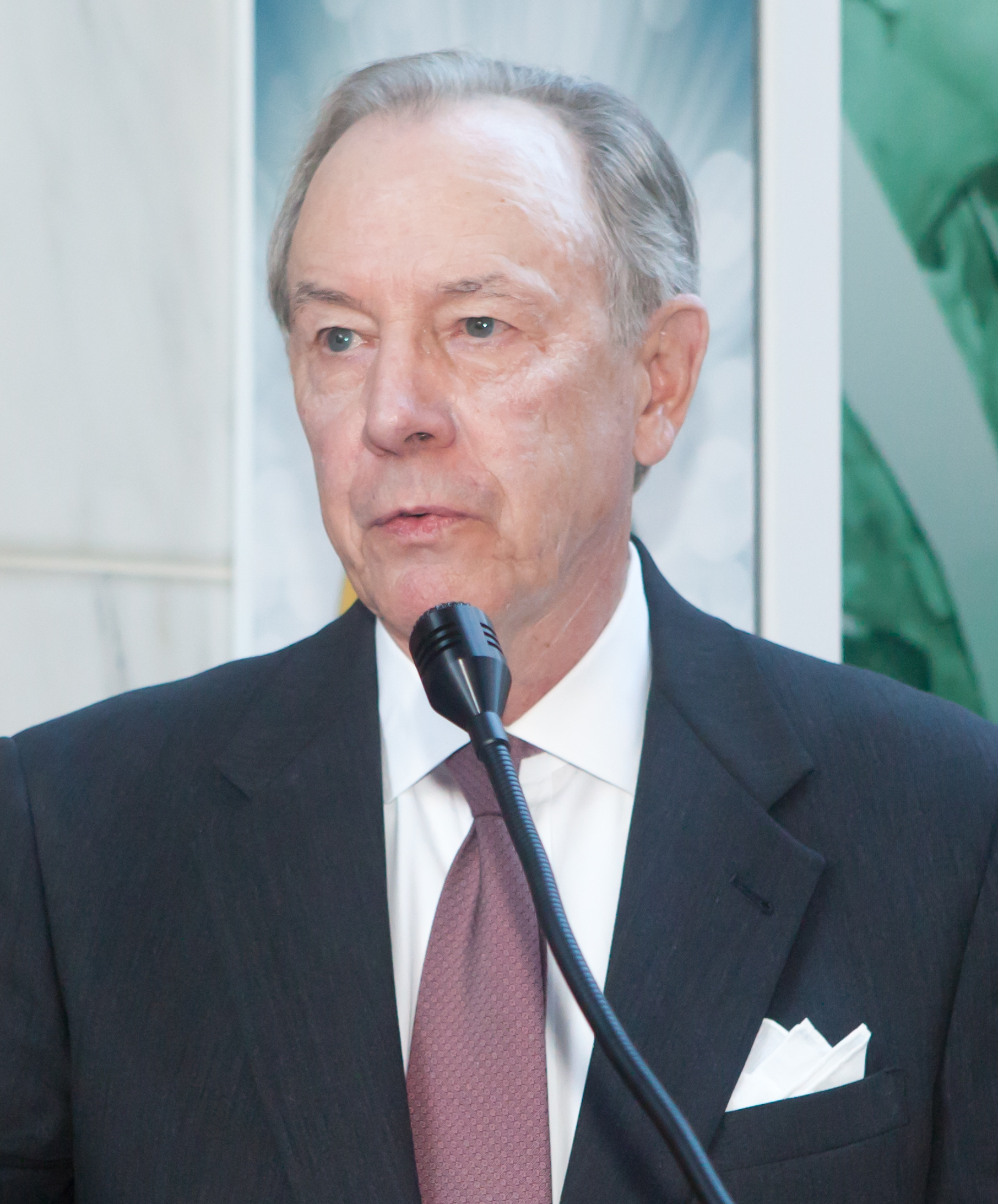
- Randolph in 2013

Senior Judge of the United States Court of Appeals for the District of Columbia Circuit
- Incumbent
- Assumed office November 1, 2008

Judge of the United States Court of Appeals for the District of Columbia Circuit
- In office July 16, 1990 – November 1, 2008
- Appointed by: George H. W. Bush
- Preceded by: Spottswood William Robinson III
- Succeeded by: Sri Srinivasan

Personal details
- Born: Arthur Raymond Randolph; November 1, 1943 (age 82) Riverside Township, New Jersey, U.S.
- Education: Drexel University (BS); University of Pennsylvania (JD)

Arthur Raymond Randolph (born November 1, 1943) is an American lawyer and jurist serving as a senior U.S. circuit judge of the U.S. Court of Appeals for the District of Columbia. He was appointed to the D.C. Circuit in 1990 by President George H. W. Bush and assumed senior status in 2008.

== Early life and education ==
Randolph was born in Riverside Township, New Jersey, on November 1, 1943. He grew up in two communities in New Jersey: Palmyra and the Glendora section of Gloucester Township. He graduated from Triton Regional High School in 1961 as a member of the school's first graduating class.

Randolph graduated from Drexel University in 1966 with a Bachelor of Science in economics and engineering. At Drexel, he was president of the debate society, vice president of the Student Senate, and a member of the varsity wrestling squad. He then attended the University of Pennsylvania Law School, where he was managing editor of the University of Pennsylvania Law Review. He graduated in 1969 with a Juris Doctor degree, summa cum laude, having been first in his class all three years. To pay college expenses, he concurrently was a General Motors factory worker.

== Career ==
Randolph was a law clerk for Judge Henry Friendly of the U.S. Court of Appeals for the Second Circuit from 1969 to 1970, then began a career in law in Washington, D.C., moving between private practice, government, and academia.

He started as an Assistant to the United States Solicitor General for three years, briefing and arguing cases in the Supreme Court of the United States. In 1973 he went into private practice at the law firm Miller, Cassidy, Larroca & Lewin (now part of Baker Botts), where he represented government officials in the Watergate controversy, including former Attorney General Richard Kleindeinst and then President Richard Nixon after the President left office.

Randolph returned to the Department of Justice as Deputy U.S. Solicitor General to Solicitor General Robert H. Bork from 1975 to 1977. He was also a adjunct Professor at Georgetown University Law Center from 1974 to 1978, teaching civil procedure and injunctions. In 1979, Randolph was appointed Special Counsel to the Committee on Standards of Official Conduct of the United States House of Representatives, remaining in this position until 1980. Then in private practice he became a partner at Pepper Hamilton (now Troutman Pepper) until his judicial appointment in 1990.

He held a number of positions while in private practice, including Special Assistant Attorney General for the states of New Mexico (1985–90), Utah (1986–1990) and Montana (1983–1990). He also served as a member of the Advisory Panel of the Federal Courts Study Committee. From 1971 until his appointment to the court in 1990, Randolph argued 25 times in the United States Supreme Court.

=== Federal judicial service ===
Randolph was nominated by President George H. W. Bush on May 8, 1990, to a seat on the United States Court of Appeals for the District of Columbia Circuit vacated by Judge Spottswood William Robinson III. He was confirmed by the United States Senate on July 13, 1990, and received commission on July 16, 1990. He assumed senior status on November 1, 2008.

From 1993 through 1995 Judge Randolph was a member of the Committee on Codes of Conduct of the Judicial Conference of the United States, and from 1995 to 1998 he served as the Committee's chairman.

Over the years, Judge Randolph accepted all expenses paid fishing trips to Alaska from billionaire Paul Singer and multi-millionaire Robin Arkley II, even though Singer and Arkley had business before the federal courts. Judge Randolph failed to report these "gifts" and claimed that the court clerk said he did not need to report the trips.

== Notable cases ==
In 2006, Judge Randolph found that a rule by Security and Exchange Commission requiring hedge funds to consider natural persons as clients was arbitrary and capricious. In June 2017, Randolph partially dissented when the court found that the Foreign Sovereign Immunities Act did not prevent the survivors of a Holocaust victim from suing to recover art stolen by Nazi plunderers.

=== Guantanamo Bay ===
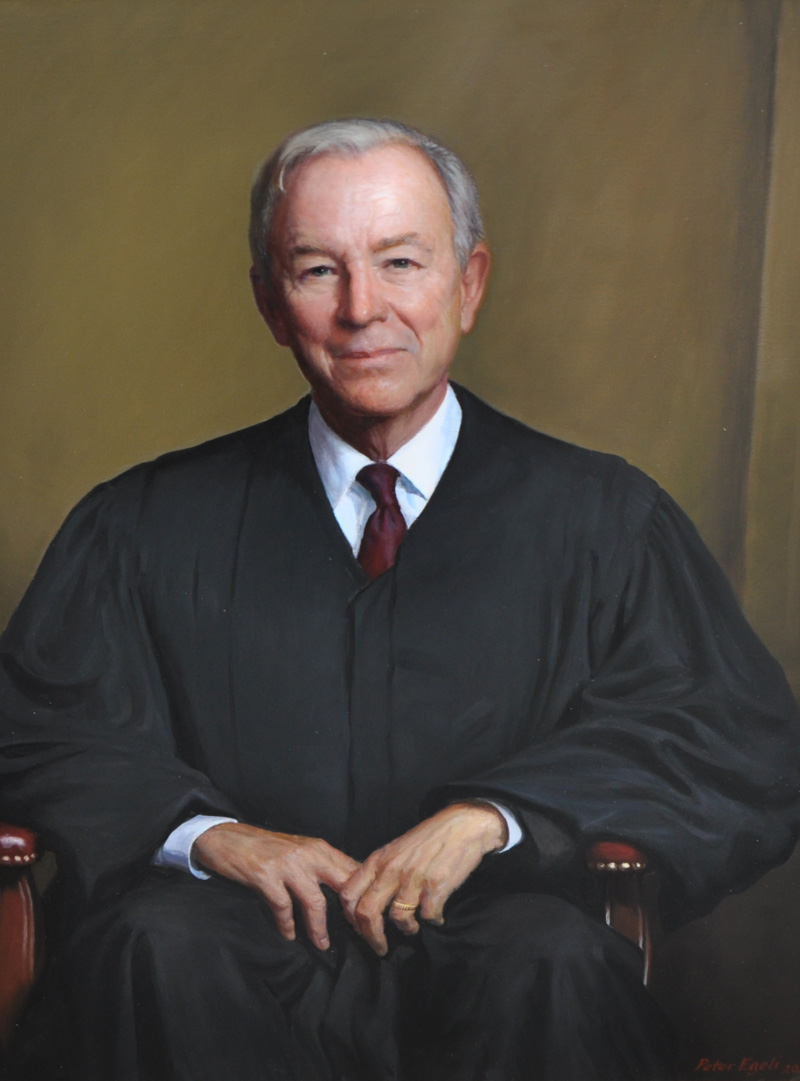
Official judicial portrait

Al Odah v. United States was the first appeal before the D.C. Circuit challenging the Bush Administration's policies regarding detention of suspected terrorists at Guantanamo Bay. In Al Odah, Judge Randolph wrote for a unanimous panel that the detainees at Guantanamo Bay did not have rights under the United States Constitution. That decision was reversed by the Supreme Court in Rasul v. Bush. The United States Congress subsequently passed the Detainee Treatment Act, which was intended to reverse the effect of the Supreme Court's decision in Rasul.

Judge Randolph also wrote the majority opinion for the D.C. Circuit in Hamdan v. Rumsfeld. Hamdan involved a challenge to the Bush Administration's military commissions to try designated "enemy combatants" at Guantanamo Bay. Judge Randolph held for a unanimous court that the Administration had authority to conduct the commissions and that they were not in violation of the Geneva Conventions. Judge Stephen Williams concurred in the judgment, disagreeing on the latter point. The Supreme Court reversed the D.C. Circuit in Hamdan v. Rumsfeld. Again, the United States Congress passed legislation, this time the Military Commissions Act of 2006, to reverse the effect of the Supreme Court's ruling.

Rasul v. Bush became Boumediene v. Bush when it came again before the D.C. Circuit. Judge Randolph again wrote the majority opinion. In Boumediene the court upheld the Military Commissions Act, which stripped the federal courts of jurisdiction to hear petitions of habeas corpus from aliens detained by the US Military. This time Judge Judith Rogers dissented. The petitioners in Boumediene asked the Supreme Court to reverse Judge Randolph's opinion. The Court denied their petition, but, in an unusual move, later reversed itself and granted certiorari, then reversed.

In March 2017, Randolph argued that the public has no First Amendment right to access prisoners' court filings when the court, unanimous in judgment but in divided opinions, found that the press could not access classified video of Jihad Ahmed Mustafa Dhiab being force fed during the Guantanamo Bay hunger strikes.

Legal offices
Preceded by Spottswood William Robinson III	Judge of the United States Court of Appeals for the District of Columbia Circuit; 1990–2008	Succeeded by Sri Srinivasan
