= Commission on Federal Ethics Law Reform =

Commission on Federal Ethics Law Reform was a commission established by President George H. W. Bush in Executive Order 12668 to review federal ethics laws, executive orders, and policies and to make recommendations to the president for legislative, administrative, and other reforms needed to ensure full public confidence in the integrity of all federal public officials and employees.

Committee members:

- Malcolm Richard Wilkey—Chairman
- Griffin B. Bell—Vice Chairman
- Jan Witold Baran
- Judith Hippler Bello
- Lloyd N. Cutler
- Fred Fisher Fielding
- Harrison H. Schmitt
- R. James Woolsey
