= Spruce 1 =

Coordinates: 38°52′39″N 81°47′52″W

Spruce 1 is a proposed coal strip-mining operation approximately two miles northeast of Blair in Logan County, West Virginia, in the Appalachian Mountains. First proposed in 1997 by Arch Coal Inc. of St. Louis, the operation was first to cover 3,113 acres (12.60 km^{2}), then reduced to 2,278. The permitting process was closely monitored by environmental groups and the mining industry alike with regard to the Obama administration's future mining policy.

In 2005, the United States Army Corps of Engineers began reviewing the permit application by Hobet Mining, Inc. to construct the mine. The Corps of Engineers issued a permit for it on January 31, 2007, but legal action delayed construction of the mine, and the Environmental Protection Agency (EPA) considered revoking the permit. United States House of Representatives member Nick Rahall, a Democrat from West Virginia's 3rd congressional district, claimed in a speech preceding a May 2010 public EPA hearing that the EPA's actions would cost West Virginia jobs. At that hearing, testimony came mostly from people supporting the local coal industry.

Shawn M. Garvin, Mid-Atlantic regional administration of the EPA, issued a recommendation in October 2010 against constructing Spruce 1 because the mine "would likely have unacceptable adverse effects on wildlife." The EPA revoked the permit on January 13, 2011.

On March 23, 2012, federal judge Amy Berman Jackson overturned the decision by the EPA that revoked a permit for the Spruce 1 mine project. In her ruling, Jackson stated that the EPA did not have power under the Clean Water Act to rescind the permit. That ruling was overturned by the United States Court of Appeals for the District of Columbia Circuit in April 2013, and on September 30, 2014, Berman Jackson ruled in the EPA's favor, allowing its veto of the permit to stand.
