= C. Dickerman Williams =

American lawyer (1900–1998)

Charles Dickerman Williams
- Born: October 1, 1900
- Died: August 12, 1998 (aged 97); Hamden, Connecticut, U.S.
- Education: Yale Law School
- Occupation: Lawyer
- Employer: U.S. Commerce Department
- Organization: American Civil Liberties Union
- Known for: Freedom of speech advocate, Chief legal officer for the U.S. Commerce Department
- Television: Firing Line
- Children: Stephen F. Williams

Charles Dickerman Williams (October 1, 1900 – August 12, 1998) was an American lawyer who was known as a freedom of speech advocate. In 1951, the president appointed him chief legal officer for the U.S. Commerce Department.

== Education & career ==
In 1922, Williams graduated from Yale University, and in 1924 from Yale Law School. Williams served for a year as a clerk to Chief Justice William Howard Taft of the U.S. Supreme Court.

He was an Assistant United States Attorney in Manhattan fighting bootleggers as head of a prohibition enforcement unit in 1926.

In private practice with firm of Baker, Nelson & Williams he successfully argued in district court the case of Linus C. Pauling v. National Review, relying on the reasoning behind the case New York Times Co. v. Sullivan that public figures were unable to sue for libel except when there was actual malice.

In 1954, Williams joined the board of directors of the American Civil Liberties Union.

He appeared as chairman during the first few seasons of Firing Line, the television program moderated by William F. Buckley (founder of the National Review).

== Personal life ==
Williams died in Hamden, Connecticut, on August 12, 1998. He was the father of Judge Stephen F. Williams.

== Selected publications ==
- Williams, C. Dickerman (1955). "Problems of the Fifth Amendment," 24 Fordham L. Rev. 19
- Rouh Jr., Joseph L.; Williams, C. D. (1957). "Book Reviews". U. Pa. L. Rev. 105 (5): 771. Archived from the original on October 8, 2014.
- Banco Nacional de Cuba v. Sabbatino (1963), Oyez.com

== See also ==
- List of law clerks for the chief justice of the United States
