= United States v. Philip Morris =

Prosecution of tobacco companies under the RICO Act

United States v. Philip Morris USA, Inc. was a case, first brought in 1999, in which the United States District Court for the District of Columbia held several major tobacco companies, titularly Philip Morris USA, liable for violations of the Racketeer Influenced and Corrupt Organization (RICO) Act by engaging in numerous acts of fraud to further a conspiracy to deceive the American public about nicotine addiction and the health effects of cigarettes and environmental tobacco smoke.

In 2006, Judge Gladys Kessler found that the evidence overwhelmingly established that the companies violated RICO by coordinating their public relations, research, and marketing efforts in order to advance their scheme to defraud by denying the adverse health effects of smoking, denying the addictiveness of nicotine, denying their manipulation of the nicotine content of cigarettes, and denying that their marketing targeted youth as new smokers. The companies also suppressed and destroyed information related to the dangers of smoking in order to enhance the market for cigarettes.

== Trial ==
=== Complaint ===
On September 22, 1999, the United States Department of Justice brought a lawsuit against nine cigarette manufacturers and two tobacco industry trade associations in the United States District Court for the District of Columbia ("District Court"):

1. Philip Morris USA
2. R. J. Reynolds Tobacco Company, later Reynolds American
3. Brown & Williamson, later part of Reynolds American
4. Lorillard Tobacco Company
5. Liggett Group
6. American Tobacco Company, merged with Brown & Williamson
7. Philip Morris Cos., later Altria
8. BAT Industries, later part of British American Tobacco
9. British American Tobacco
10. Council for Tobacco Research
11. Tobacco Institute

The complaint alleged that the tobacco companies had engaged in an approximately fifty-year conspiracy to fraudulently deceive the American public about the health effects of smoking and environmental tobacco smoke, the addictiveness of nicotine, the health benefits from low tar, "light" cigarettes, and their manipulation of the design and composition of cigarettes in order to sustain nicotine addiction. According to the complaint, the tobacco companies deliberately sought to deny that smoking caused disease and to maintain that there was no scientific consensus on the subject. In furtherance of this strategy, Defendants allegedly issued deceptive press releases, published false and misleading articles, destroyed and concealed documents which indicated that there was in fact a correlation between smoking and disease, and aggressively targeted children as potential new smokers.

The lawsuit sought to recover health care expenditures the government had paid and would have to pay to treat tobacco-related illnesses as a result of the tobacco companies' unlawful action under three federal statutes: the Medical Care Recovery Act ("MCRA"), the Medicare Secondary Payer ("MSP") provisions, and the Racketeer Influenced and Corrupt Organizations Act ("RICO"). Additionally, the government requested injunctive relief under the RICO Act to prevent the tobacco companies from engaging in further fraud and to disgorge the companies' ill-gotten proceeds from their illegal activity.

=== Proceedings ===
Defendants moved to dismiss the case on all counts, and in September 2000, the District Court granted their motion in part, dismissing the MCRA and MSP claims and preventing the government from recovering tobacco-related health care expenditures. However, the court allowed the case to proceed on the RICO claims. Under RICO, the Government sought injunctive relief and $289 billion in disgorgement of defendants' ill-gotten gains from the alleged conspiracy. Defendants appealed the requested relief to the United States Court of Appeals for the District of Columbia Circuit ("DC Circuit"). On interlocutory appeal, the DC Circuit determined that disgorgement is not a permissible remedy in civil RICO cases because injunctive relief must be "forward looking" to prevent and restrain future violations.

The Government continued to seek monetary damages to fund smoking cessation and prevention programs, and in 2005, the Department of Justice amended its requested relief for these programs from $130 billion over 25 years to $14 billion over ten years. At this time, several public health groups joined the lawsuit as intervenors for the purpose of asserting their interests in the proposed relief.

== Opinion of the court ==
On August 17, 2006, Judge Gladys Kessler issued a landmark 1,683-page opinion holding the tobacco companies liable for conspiracy and violations of RICO by fraudulently covering up the health risks associated with cigarettes and for marketing their products to children. Kessler wrote that the tobacco companies "have marketed and sold their lethal product with zeal, with deception, with a single-minded focus on their financial success, and without regard for the human tragedy or social costs that success exacted."

Because the DC Circuit held that RICO permits only forward-looking remedies to prevent and restrain future violations, Judge Kessler ruled that the tobacco companies could not be made to fund the smoking cessation and awareness programs. The ruling ordered the following injunctive relief:

=== Prohibition of Brand Descriptors ===
The court found that the only way to restrain defendants from their longstanding and continuing fraudulent efforts to deceive smokers, potential smokers, and the American public about "light" and "low tar" cigarettes was to prohibit them from using any descriptor which conveys a health message. Accordingly, Judge Kessler enjoined defendants from using any descriptors indicating lower tar delivery—including, but not limited to, "low tar," "light," "mild," "medium" and "ultra-light"—which create the false impression that such cigarettes are less harmful to smokers.

=== Corrective communications ===
The trial record established that defendants had made false, deceptive, and misleading public statements about cigarettes, and the court found that an injunction ordering them to issue corrective statements is appropriate and necessary to prevent and restrain them from making fraudulent public statements on smoking and health matters in the future.

Judge Kessler ordered defendants to make corrective statements about: (1) addiction, (2) the adverse health effects of smoking), (3) the adverse health effects of exposure to second-hand smoke, (4) the manipulation of the cigarettes to enhance nicotine delivery, and (5) the health benefits of "light" and "low tar" cigarettes. Defendants were required to publish these statements in newspapers and disseminate them through television, advertisements, onsets, in retail displays, and on their corporate websites.

=== Disclosure of Documents and Disaggregated Marketing Data ===
The court determined that defendants' suppression and concealment of information was integral to their efforts to defraud the American public, and that defendants had failed to disclose, and created false controversy over the existence of, information they possessed about cigarettes.

Judge Kessler ordered that the tobacco companies must create and maintain document depositories and websites which provide the government and the public with access to all industry documents disclosed in the litigation. Additionally, defendants must provide their disaggregated marketing data to the government to ensure transparency of their marketing efforts, particularly those directed towards youth.

== Outcome ==
All parties appealed Judge Kessler's 2006 decision to the DC Circuit. In 2009, a three-judge panel unanimously upheld Judge Kessler's finding of liability and upheld most of the ordered remedies. A subsequent appeal was rejected by the Supreme Court.

=== Corrective statements ===
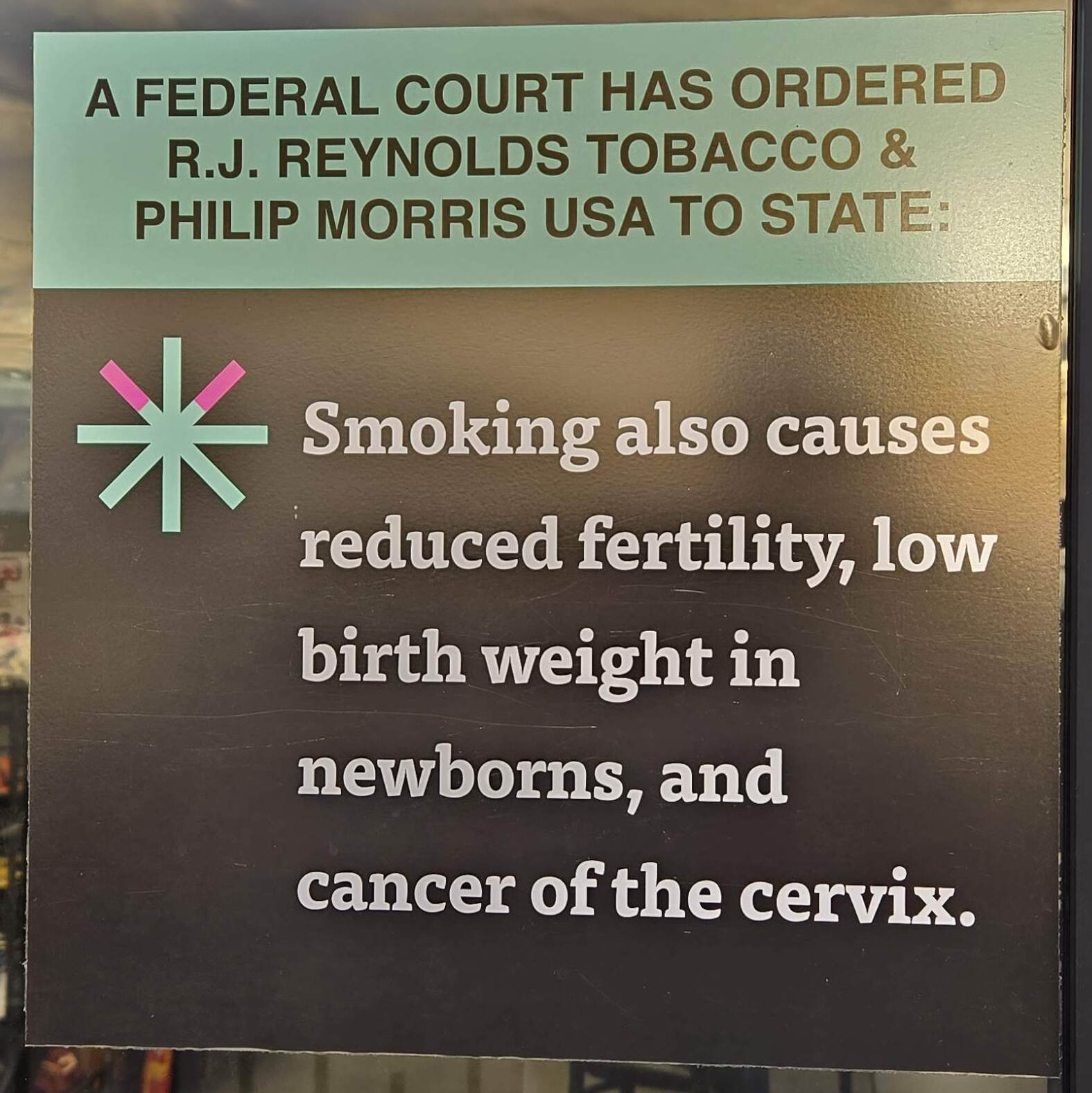
Corrective statement at a convenience store in Whitehall, Pennsylvania (2024).

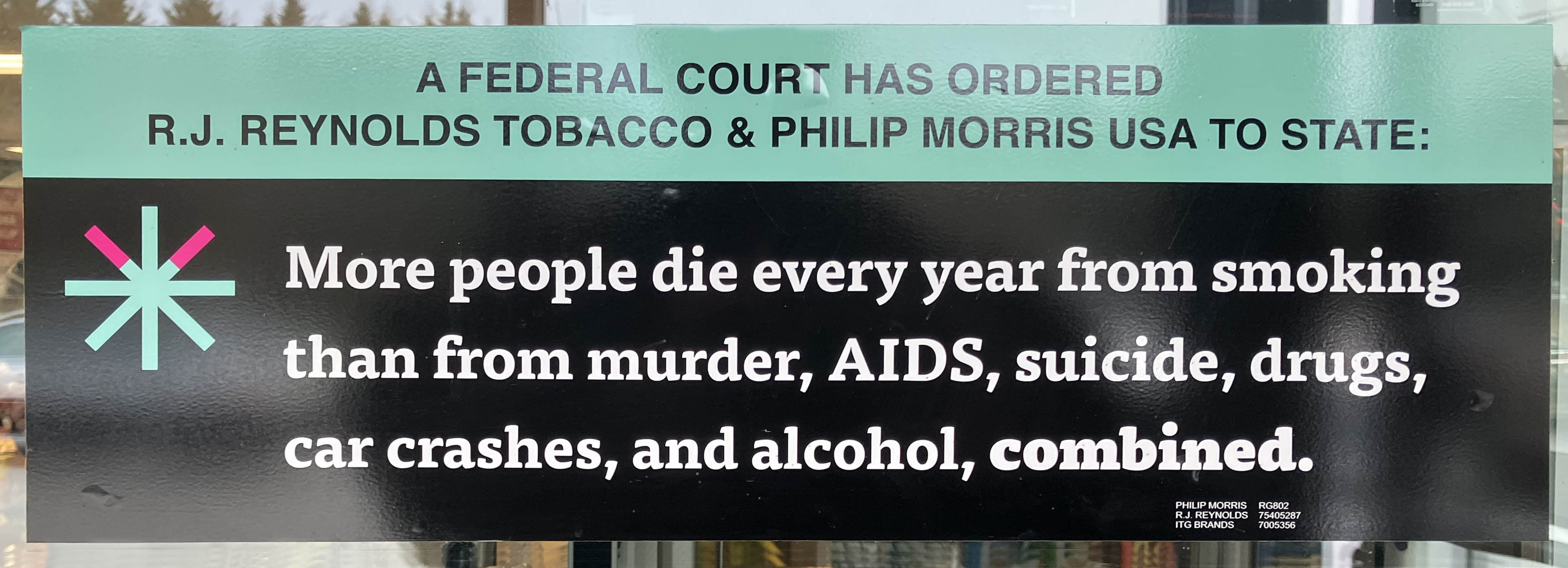
Another corrective statement (2025).

Judge Kessler ordered the tobacco companies to make corrective statements on five topics about which they had historically deceived and misled the public. The specific language of these statements was not included in the 2006 ruling, but the parties were to submit proposals for approval by the court. The tobacco companies appealed to the DC Circuit, challenging the corrective-disclosure remedy under both RICO and the First Amendment.

The DC Circuit upheld the corrective statements as a valid remedy in 2009, finding that requiring defendants to reveal the previously hidden truth about their products will prevent and restrain them from disseminating false and misleading statements, thereby violating RICO, in the future. However, the statements must be confined to purely factual and uncontroversial information, intended to thwart efforts to either directly mislead consumers or capitalize on prior deceptions by continuing to advertise in a manner that builds on consumers' existing misperceptions. The DC Circuit also vacated a requirement that the statements be published on retail displays, instructing the District Court to consider the third-party implications of this remedy on remand.

In 2012, Judge Kessler released specific language for the five corrective statements based on proposals submitted by all parties after the 2009 DC Circuit ruling. The tobacco companies were ordered to make the corrective statements through television and newspaper advertising, on their websites and on cigarette packaging. In a series of subsequent appeals, defendants challenged the language proposed by the court, claiming that portions of the selected text violated their First Amendment rights and were intended to humiliate them and disclose prior wrongdoing rather than prevent and restrain future RICO violations. These appeals resulted in modifications to the language of proposed statements.

In 2022, the court ordered the tobacco companies to post the 17 corrective statements in over 200,000 retail stores for 21 months starting July 2023.

==== Evaluation ====
A study in New York City and New Jersey showed that signage display in 600 tobacco retailers was generally high (92%), with differences between types of shops and neighbourhoods. Another study in 29,000 tobacco retailers in all US states found an overall compliance of 80%. Retailers located in neighbourhoods with the highest percentage of Black residents were twice as likely to be non‑compliant.

The exposure of US adults to point-of-sale corrective statements was also assessed. In 2024, one in three US adults (37 %) reported seeing point-of-sale corrective statements. Among them, 54% trusted the information.

== See also ==
- Tobacco control
- Tobacco politics
- Tobacco Master Settlement Agreement
- Tobacco packaging warning messages
- Tobacco in the United States
