= Maasoum Abdah Mouhammad =

Guantanamo detainee

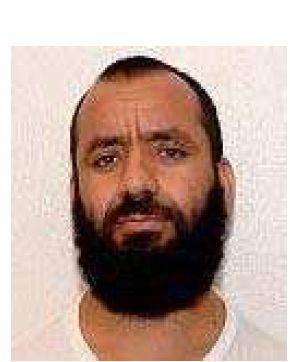
- Born: 1972 (age 53–54); Al Qameshle, Syria
- Detained at: Guantanamo
- Other names: Kari Bilal; Shargo Shirz Juwan
- ISN: 330
- Charge(s): no charge, extrajudicial detention
- Status: Released to Bulgaria

Maasoum Abdah Mouhammad, a citizen of Syria, was formerly held in extrajudicial detention in the U.S. Guantanamo Bay detention camps, in Cuba.

Guantanamo counter-terrorism analysts estimate he was born in 1972, in Al Qameshle, Syria. He is from the Kurdish ethnic group.

Maasoum Abdah Mouhammad was held at Guantanamo for almost eight years until he was released to Bulgaria on May 4, 2010.

== Official status reviews ==
Originally the Bush Presidency asserted that captives apprehended in the "war on terror" were not covered by the Geneva Conventions, and could be held indefinitely, without charge, and without an open and transparent review of the justifications for their detention. In 2004 the United States Supreme Court ruled, in Rasul v. Bush, that Guantanamo captives were entitled to being informed of the allegations justifying their detention, and were entitled to try to refute them.

=== Office for the Administrative Review of Detained Enemy Combatants ===
Combatant Status Review Tribunals were held in a 3x5 meter trailer where the captive sat with his hands and feet shackled to a bolt in the floor.

Following the Supreme Court's ruling the Department of Defense set up the Office for the Administrative Review of Detained Enemy Combatants.

Scholars at the Brookings Institution, led by Benjamin Wittes, listed the captives still held in Guantanamo in December 2008, according to whether their detention was justified by certain common allegations:

- Maasoum Abdah Mouhammad was listed as one of the captives who "The military alleges ... are members of the Taliban."
- Maasoum Abdah Mouhammad was listed as one of the captives who "The military alleges that the following detainees stayed in Al Qaeda, Taliban or other guest- or safehouses."
- Maasoum Abdah Mouhammad was listed as one of the captives who "The military alleges ... took military or terrorist training in Afghanistan."
- Maasoum Abdah Mouhammad was listed as one of the captives who "The military alleges ... were at Tora Bora."
- Maasoum Abdah Mouhammad was listed as one of the captives whose "names or aliases were found on material seized in raids on Al Qaeda safehouses and facilities."
- Maasoum Abdah Mouhammad was listed as one of the captives who was a foreign fighter.

=== Habeas corpus petition ===
A writ of habeas corpus was filed on Maasoum Abdah Mouhammad's behalf.

On July 15, 2008, Kristine A. Huskey filed a "notice of petitioners' request for 30 days' notice of transfer" on behalf of several dozen captives including Maasoum Abdah Mouhammad.

=== Formerly secret Joint Task Force Guantanamo assessment ===
On April 25, 2011, whistleblower organization WikiLeaks published formerly secret assessments drafted by Joint Task Force Guantanamo analysts. His 14-page Joint Task Force Guantanamo assessment was drafted on April 5, 2008. It was signed by camp commandant Rear Admiral Mark Buzby, who recommended continued detention.

== Asylum in Canada ==
On February 10, 2009, CBC News reported that Maassoum Abdah Mouhammad was the fifth Guantanamo captive to attract a refugee-sponsoring group, in Canada. The other four men were Djamel Ameziane, who had lived in Canada prior to traveling to Afghanistan, and Hassan Anvar and two other Uyghur captives from Guantanamo.

== Asylum in Bulgaria ==
Reuters reported that Bulgaria was negotiating accepting former Guantanamo captives in December 2009.

On May 4, 2010, the USA transferred three Guantanamo captives to three European countries, publishing their nationalities, without publishing their identities. On May 19, 2010, historian Andy Worthington, author of The Guantanamo Files, reported that the Syrian transferred to Bulgaria was Maasoum. Worthington was told by local journalists that Maasoum's family had been allowed to join him in Bulgaria. Worthington's conclusion was that Maasoum and three other Syrians captured with him were probably told their interrogators the truth about being in Afghanistan as economic migrants, not jihadists.

Local reporters asserted that Maasoum said that he had gone to Afghanistan to find a wife, that he was not a fighter, and that his detention was due to being mistaken for another man, named Bilal.

Balkan Insight quoted Bulgarian Interior Minister Tsvetan Tsvetanov, who said that Bulgaria wanted to accept a former captive who was a married man, under 40, who had not been a trouble-maker while in detention.

In December 2010, Der Spiegel reported that formerly secret diplomatic cables, published by whistleblower organization WikiLeaks, revealed details of Bulgaria's negotiations with the US, over accepting former Guantanamo captives. They reported that, in return for granting refugee status to two former captives the USA would lift the restriction that visitors from Bulgaria would require a travel visa.
