= Gladys Kessler =

American judge (1938–2023)

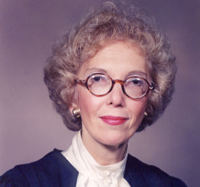

Senior Judge of the United States District Court for the District of Columbia
- In office January 22, 2007 – March 16, 2023

Judge of the United States District Court for the District of Columbia
- In office June 16, 1994 – January 22, 2007
- Appointed by: Bill Clinton
- Preceded by: Michael Boudin
- Succeeded by: Amy Berman Jackson

Judge of the Superior Court of the District of Columbia
- In office 1977–1994
- Nominated by: Jimmy Carter
- Preceded by: Theodore R. Newman Jr.
- Succeeded by: Linda K. Davis

Personal details
- Born: January 22, 1938 New York City, New York, U.S.
- Died: March 16, 2023 (aged 85) Washington, D.C., U.S.
- Education: Cornell University (BA); Harvard University (LLB)

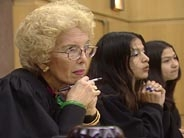

Gladys Kessler (January 22, 1938 – March 16, 2023) was a United States district judge of the District Court for the District of Columbia.

== Education and career ==
After receiving her Bachelor of Arts degree from Cornell University and Bachelor of Laws from Harvard Law School, she was hired by the National Labor Relations Board. She worked as a legislative assistant to Senator Harrison A. Williams (D–NJ), and subsequently for United States Congressman Jonathan B. Bingham (D–NY). Kessler worked for the New York City Board of Education, and then opened a public interest law firm.

== Judicial career ==
=== Superior Court of the District of Columbia service ===
In June 1977, she was appointed as an associate judge of the Superior Court of the District of Columbia, and from 1981 to 1985 served as presiding judge of the family division. She was president of the National Association of Women Judges from 1983 to 1984, and served on the executive committee of the American Bar Association Conference of Federal Trial Judges and the U.S. Judicial Conference's Committee on Court Administration and Management.

=== Federal judicial service ===
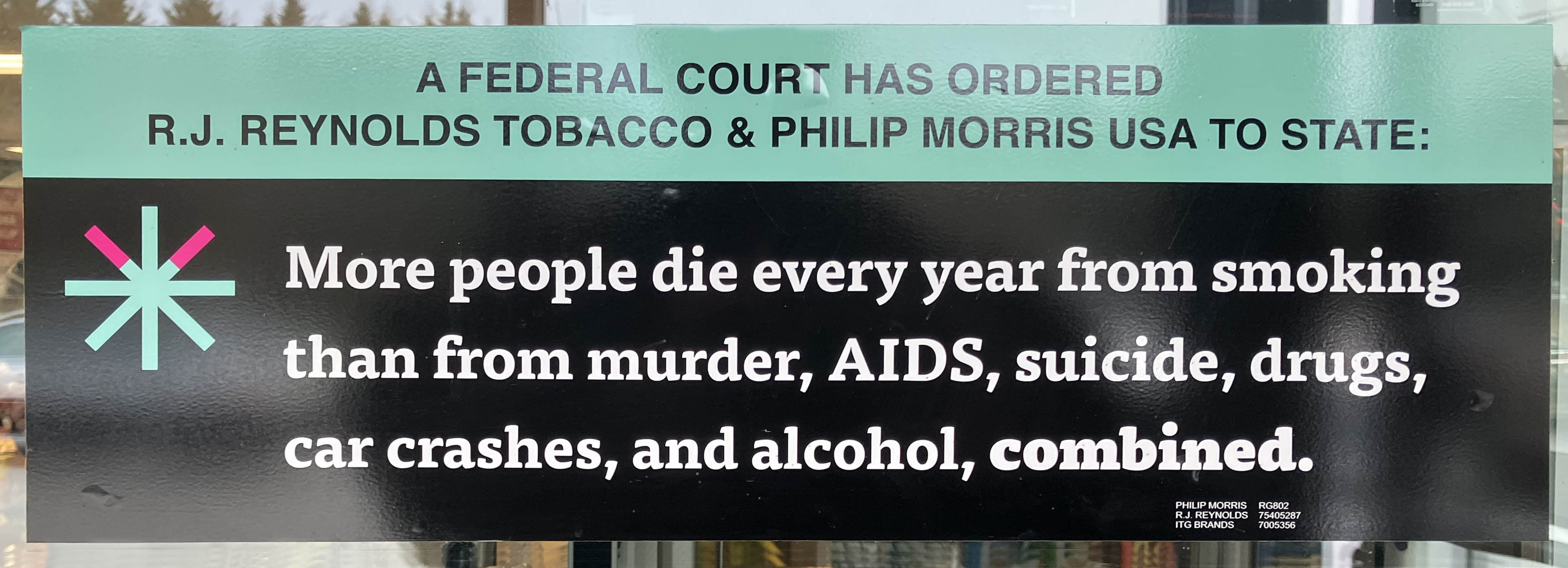
In United States v. Philip Morris (2006), Gladys Kessler ordered the tobacco industry to publish corrective statements

On March 22, 1994, President Bill Clinton nominated Kessler to serve as a United States district judge for the United States District Court for the District of Columbia, to the seat vacated by Judge Michael Boudin. She was confirmed by the Senate on June 15, 1994, and received her commission on June 16, 1994. She assumed senior status on January 22, 2007.

In 2002 she heard a case lodged by the Holy Land Foundation for Relief and Development appealing against their designation as a terrorist organisation under Executive Order 13224. At the time the Palestinian-American charity was the largest Muslim charity in the United States, taking $13 million in donations in 2000. The Judge dismissed the case ordering all evidence be struck from the record. The court of appeals decided that she had been mistaken in her decision to not allow the case to go before a jury, but due to the fact that the case involved national security they would allow the decision to stand.

== Detainee treatment cases ==
Kessler was the first judge to consider an appeal that the executive branch is violating the Detainee Treatment Act. In 2006, she heard the case of Mohammad Bawazir, a prisoner at Camp Delta. The George W. Bush administration argued that the Detainee Treatment Act, legislation spearheaded by John McCain banning cruel or inhuman treatment, did not apply to Bawazir and other detainees at the Guantanamo Bay detention camp, Cuba.

On October 10, 2007, the Washington Post headlined "Judge Orders U.S. Not to Transfer Tunisian Detainee," and reported that Judge Kessler "ruled last week that Mohammed Abdul Rahman cannot be sent [from Guantanamo] to Tunisia because he could suffer 'irreparable harm." The detainee's lawyer said, "The executive has now been told it cannot bury its Guantanamo mistakes in Third World prisons." He also stated that, "This is the first time the judicial branch has exercised its inherent power to control the excesses of the executive as to treatment of prisoners at Guantanamo Bay."

Kessler twice denied relief to detainee Jihad Ahmed Mustafa Dhiab, first determining that she had no jurisdiction over his confinement conditions, and, after that theory was rejected by the United States Court of Appeals for the District of Columbia Circuit, that the government was permitted to use force-feedings on detainees during the Guantanamo Bay hunger strikes. Kessler did, however, twice grant news media requests for access to classified video of the force-feedings, before ultimately being reversed by the D.C. Circuit.

== Death ==
Kessler died on March 16, 2023, at the age of 85 from complications of pneumonia, according to her family.

== See also ==
- List of Jewish American jurists
- United States v. Philip Morris

Legal offices
Preceded by Michael Boudin	Judge of the United States District Court for the District of Columbia; 1994–2007	Succeeded by Amy Berman Jackson
