= Amy Berman Jackson =

American judge (born 1954)

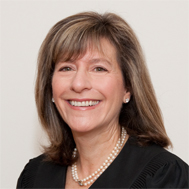

Senior Judge of the United States District Court for the District of Columbia
- Incumbent
- Assumed office May 1, 2023

Judge of the United States District Court for the District of Columbia
- In office March 18, 2011 – May 1, 2023
- Appointed by: Barack Obama
- Preceded by: Gladys Kessler
- Succeeded by: Loren AliKhan

Personal details
- Born: Amy Sauber Berman; 1954 (age 71–72) Baltimore, Maryland, U.S.
- Spouse: Darryl Jackson (m. 1989; div. 2013)
- Children: 2, including Matt
- Education: Harvard University (BA, JD)

Amy Sauber Berman Jackson (born 1954) is an American lawyer serving as a senior United States district judge of the United States District Court for the District of Columbia. Born and raised in Baltimore, Maryland, she graduated from Harvard Law School in 1979. After graduation, she served as a law clerk until 1980. She then worked as an assistant US attorney until 1984, when she entered private-sector work. She was nominated as a federal judge in 2011 and unanimously confirmed by the United States Senate. In 2023, she became a senior judge.

== Early life and education ==
Amy Berman was born in 1954, in Baltimore, Maryland, She is the daughter of Mildred (Sauber) and Barnett Berman, a physician at Johns Hopkins Hospital. She graduated from Harvard College in 1976 with a Bachelor of Arts, cum laude, and from Harvard Law School in 1979 with a Juris Doctor, cum laude.

== Career ==
After graduating from law school, Jackson served as a law clerk to Judge Harrison Lee Winter of the United States Court of Appeals for the Fourth Circuit from 1979 to 1980. From 1980 to 1986, she served as an assistant United States attorney for the District of Columbia, where she received Department of Justice Special Achievement Awards for her work on high-profile murder and sexual assault cases in 1985 and 1986. From 1986 to 1994, Jackson was an associate and then a partner at the law firm Venable, Baetjer, Howard and Civiletti (now Venable LLP).

From 2000 until her appointment as a federal judge, Jackson was a member of the law firm Trout Cacheris & Solomon PLLC in Washington, D.C., where she specialized in complex litigation, criminal investigations and defense, criminal trials, civil trials, and appeals. In 2009 Jackson represented nine-term Representative for Louisiana's 2nd congressional district William J. Jefferson in his corruption trial. In 2025, Jackson blocked the Trump administration's attempt to oust United States Office of Special Counsel head Hampton Dellinger.

Jackson has served as a legal commentator for Fox News, CNN, NBC, and MSNBC.

=== Federal judicial service ===
On June 17, 2010, President Barack Obama nominated Jackson to fill a seat on the United States District Court for the District of Columbia that was vacated by Judge Gladys Kessler, who assumed senior status in 2007. She was unanimously rated "well qualified" for the post by the American Bar Association's Standing Committee on the Federal Judiciary (the committee's highest rating). Her nomination lapsed at the end of the 111th Congress; Obama renominated her on January 5, 2011, at the beginning of the 112th Congress. The United States Senate confirmed Jackson on March 17, 2011, by a 97–0 vote. She received her commission the next day. She assumed senior status on May 1, 2023.

=== Selected opinions ===
==== Labor law ====
In Chamber of Commerce v. National Labor Relations Board (2012), Jackson ruled that the National Labor Relations Board had the statutory authority to promulgate a federal regulation requiring the posting of workplace posters informing workers of the right to organize and collectively bargain, but also struck down the portions of the regulation in which the NLRB made a "blanket advance determination that a failure to post [the notice] will always constitute an unfair labor practice" and tolled the statute of limitations in unfair labor practice actions involving a failures to post. The next year, the D.C. Circuit vacated the NLRB rule, finding that it contravened Section 8(c) of the National Labor Relations Act, the provision protecting most employers' speech.

In 2015, Jackson ruled against a coalition of businesses who challenged an NLRB rule expediting union elections.

==== EPA & Spruce Mine permit ====
Also in March 2012, Jackson overturned a decision by the Environmental Protection Agency (EPA) that revoked a permit for the Spruce 1 mine project in Logan County, West Virginia, on the ground that the EPA did not have power under the Clean Water Act to rescind the permit. That ruling was reversed by the United States Court of Appeals for the District of Columbia Circuit in April 2013. On September 30, 2014, Jackson ruled in the EPA's favor, allowing its veto of the permit to stand.

==== Jesse Jackson Jr. ====
Jackson presided at the August 2013 sentencing of former U.S. Representative Jesse Jackson Jr. and his wife, Sandi Jackson. After accepting guilty pleas to misuse of campaign funds, she sentenced Representative Jackson to 30 months and his wife to 12 months in prison.

==== Bishop of D.C. v. Sebelius ====
In December 2013, in the case of Roman Catholic Archbishop of Washington v. Sebelius, Jackson ruled for the Department of Health and Human Services under Secretary Kathleen Sebelius and against the Roman Catholic Diocese of Washington in its constitutional test case challenge to the contraceptive mandate under the Affordable Care Act as applied to the church's District of Columbia employees. The United States Department of Health and Human Services and other agencies made accommodations for religious organizations, under which such organizations did not have to "provide, pay for, or facilitate access to contraception" if they certify their objection to doing so. Jackson rejected the archdiocese's argument that the act of "self-certifying" in itself constitutes a substantial burden on the archdiocese's right to freely exercise religion.

==== Benghazi wrongful death case ====
In May 2017, Jackson dismissed a wrongful death suit filed against former Secretary of State Hillary Clinton by the parents of two of the Americans killed in the 2012 attack on the American diplomatic compound in Benghazi, Libya, on the basis of the Westfall Act.

==== Paul Manafort and Rick Gates ====
In October 2017, Jackson was assigned to preside over the criminal case that Special Counsel Robert Mueller brought against Paul Manafort and Rick Gates as part of his investigation into Russian interference in the 2016 election cycle. She accepted their "not guilty" pleas, granted bail, confiscated their passports, and ordered them held under house arrest. She also warned defense lawyers not to discuss the case outside of court. On June 15, 2018, after the prosecution accused Manafort of attempted witness tampering, Jackson revoked his bail and sent him to jail until his upcoming federal trials. On February 23, 2018, Gates pleaded guilty to one count of false statements and one count of conspiracy against the United States. The plea bargain to which Gates agreed included his cooperation with the Mueller investigation. On September 14, 2018, Manafort pleaded guilty to two counts of conspiracy against the United States and his plea bargain similarly included an agreement to cooperate with Mueller's investigation. But on February 13, 2019, Jackson ruled that Manafort had lied to Mueller's office, to the FBI, and to a grand jury after having pleaded guilty regarding his interactions with Konstantin Kilimnik, a man the FBI believed had ties to Russian intelligence agencies. Jackson ruled that the Special Counsel was no longer bound by the original terms of Manafort's plea, which included the prosecution having committed to advocating a sentence reduction for him. Trump pardoned Manafort on December 23, 2020, the same day he pardoned Roger Stone.

==== Alex van der Zwaan ====
On April 3, 2018, Jackson sentenced a former associate of Gates, Dutch attorney Alex van der Zwaan, who practiced in London, to one month in prison and a $20,000 fine. Van der Zwaan had pleaded guilty to a single count of making a false statement to investigators regarding alleged Russian interference in the 2016 United States elections. Upon release he was deported to Holland. In December 2020, Trump pardoned him.

==== Roger Stone ====
In January 2019 Jackson was assigned the case of Roger Stone, who had been an informal advisor to 2016 presidential candidate Donald Trump, after a grand jury had indicted Stone on seven counts including making false statements, obstruction of justice, and witness tampering. On February 15, 2019, Jackson imposed a limited gag order on Stone and his attorneys. On February 18, Stone posted an Instagram photo of Jackson. Stone took his post down and apologized, but on February 21, Jackson tightened the terms of his gag order, saying, "From this moment on, the defendant may not speak publicly about this case—period." In February 2020, the Department of Justice prosecutors recommended a seven-to-nine-year federal prison sentence for Stone. Trump characterized the recommendation as unfair and "a miscarriage of justice". But the Department of Justice under Attorney General William Barr recommended a shorter sentence, indicating that it should be "far less." Irate, the four lead prosecutors resigned from the case. Trump criticized Jackson's earlier judicial rulings on Twitter. On February 20, 2020, Jackson said before Stone's sentencing: "He was not prosecuted, as some have claimed, for standing up for the president. He was prosecuted for covering up for the president." Jackson denied that Stone was being punished for his politics or his allies. She sentenced him to 40 months in federal prison and a $20,000 fine. Stone's lawyers moved to disqualify Jackson; Jackson denied the motion on the basis of lack of "factual or legal support" for it. Jackson criticized Trump's personal attacks on the Stone jury foreperson after the verdict. Trump tweeted, "There has rarely been a juror so tainted as the forewoman in the Roger Stone case. Look at her background. She never revealed her hatred of 'Trump' and Stone. She was totally biased, as is the judge. Roger wasn't even working on my campaign. Miscarriage of justice. Sad to watch!"

Trump commuted Stone's sentence in July 2020, shortly before Stone was scheduled to report to federal prison. He pardoned Stone on December 23, 2020, four weeks before Joe Biden was sworn in.

==== Mueller investigation memo ====
In May 2021, Jackson found that the Justice Department under Barr had inappropriately failed to release a memo by the Special Counsel about alleged obstruction of justice. Her opinion described Barr as having summarized "what he'd hardly had time to skim, much less study closely, [which] prompted an immediate reaction, as politicians and pundits took to their microphones and Twitter feeds to decry what they feared was an attempt to hide the ball." Former U.S. Attorney Joyce Vance believed that Berman could refer Barr for investigation by the Office of Professional Responsibility or to the Justice department's Inspector General, with possibilities of censure, disbarment or prosecution. Either the IG or the OPR could further refer the case to the DOJ's Public Integrity Section, which could initiate an investigation and/or prosecution.

==== CFPB ====
On March 28, 2025, Jackson blocked the Trump administration from dismantling the Consumer Financial Protection Bureau (CFPB) and ordered the reinstatement of its employees. On August 15, 2025, a three-judge panel of the Court of Appeals for the D.C. Circuit overturned Jackson's ruling, 2-1, allowing the administration to proceed with plans to significantly reduce the CFPB staff. Judge Cornelia Pillard dissented.

== Affiliations ==
Jackson served on the board of the Washington D.C. Rape Crisis Center and has also been a member of the Parent Steering Committee of the Interdisciplinary Council on Developmental and Learning Disorders.

== Personal life ==
Jackson was married to Darryl W. Jackson, a lawyer and a senior Republican political appointee. He worked in the Office of Export Enforcement as Assistant Secretary of Commerce for George W. Bush in 2005 after leaving the Arnold & Porter firm. They have two sons, one of whom is Matt Jackson, who won 13 consecutive games on Jeopardy!, earning $411,612. While appearing on the trivia show, he said, "My mom is white, liberal and Jewish, and my dad is black, Christian and conservative."

In her spare time, Jackson writes music and sings.

== See also ==
- List of Jewish American jurists
- Timeline of investigations into Trump and Russia (2019)

Legal offices
Preceded by Gladys Kessler	Judge of the United States District Court for the District of Columbia; 2011–2023	Succeeded by Loren AliKhan
