= Korea Democracy Foundation =

South Korean non-profit organization

The Korea Democracy Foundation (KDF, Korean: 민주화운동기념사업회, romanized: Minjuhwaundong-ginyeomsa-eobhoe) is a nonprofit organization affiliated to the South Korean Ministry of the Interior and Safety set up for the purpose of enhancing Korean democracy. Its purpose also is to "establish an upright history upon this historic achievement, honor the spirits of those who committed themselves for the country, and pass on the priceless experience of the pro-democracy movement to the future generations."

The Korea Democracy Foundation was legally established on November 12, 2001, with pastor Park Hyung-kyu invited as chairman of the board. In 2006, it promoted the 'Korean Democratic Hall'.

== Incidents and controversies ==
=== Controversy over the site for the establishment of the Korea Democratic Center ===
On August 22, 2006, the construction of the memorial hall began in earnest after five years after the 'Democratization Movement Commemoration Project Association Act', which regulated the construction and operation of the Democratic Movement Memorial Hall, was enacted by the agreement of the opposition parties. The Democratic Movement Commemoration Project Association (Chairman Ham Se-Woong) held a press conference at the Press Foundation Hall and announced that "the National People's Promotion Committee for the Construction of the Korea Democracy Center will be officially launched." Chairman Ham Se-Woong said “In commemoration of the 'past' of the democratization movement, the name of the 'Democratic Movement Memorial Hall' was changed to 'Korea Democracy Hall' in the sense that it takes a step further and focuses on future-oriented activities to expand and deepen democracy" and "By the end of 2007, candidates for construction will be decided, and the construction will be completed by 2011 or 2012" at the conference.

== See also ==
- April Revolution
- 5.18 Democratization Movement
- June Democracy Movement
