= Stephen F. Williams =

American judge (1936–2020)

Stephen Williams
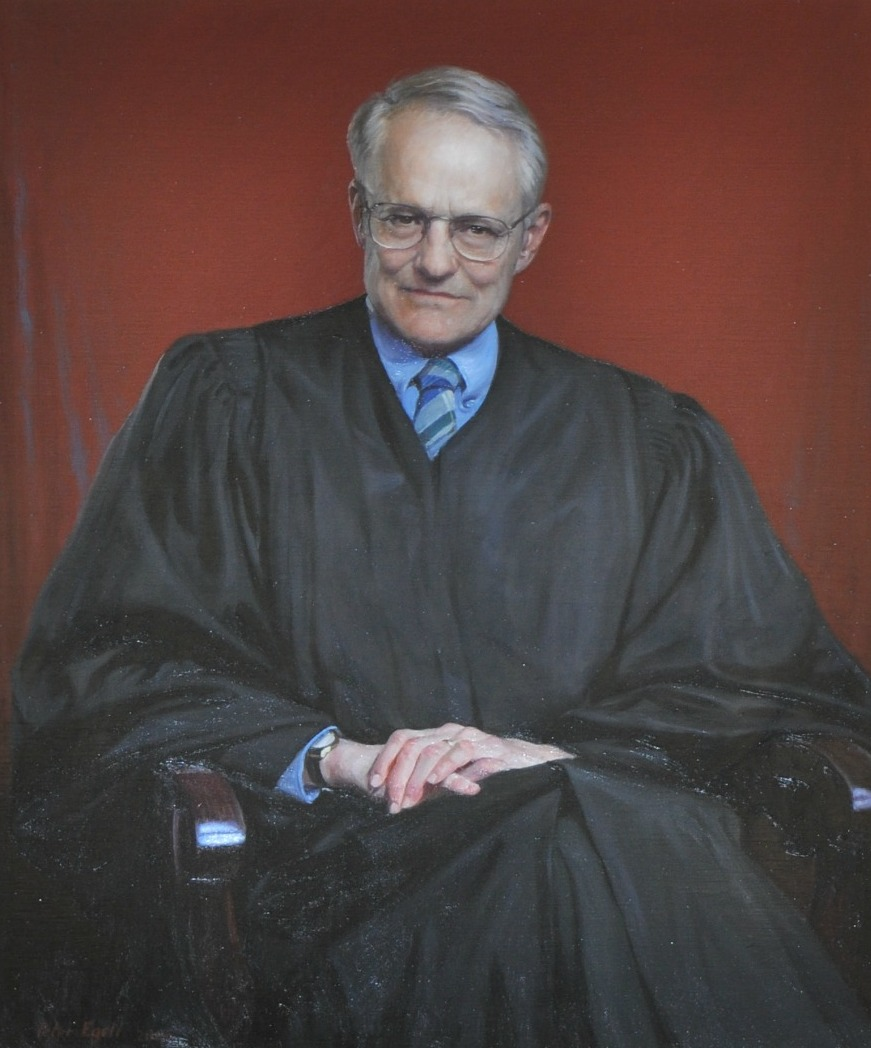

Senior Judge of the United States Court of Appeals for the District of Columbia Circuit
- In office September 30, 2001 – August 7, 2020

Judge of the United States Court of Appeals for the District of Columbia Circuit
- In office June 16, 1986 – September 30, 2001
- Appointed by: Ronald Reagan
- Preceded by: Malcolm Richard Wilkey
- Succeeded by: Janice Rogers Brown

Personal details
- Born: Stephen Fain Williams; September 23, 1936 New York City, U.S.
- Died: August 7, 2020 (aged 83) Washington, D.C., U.S.
- Education: Yale University (BA); Harvard University (JD)

Stephen Fain Williams (September 23, 1936 – August 7, 2020) was an American lawyer and jurist who was a United States circuit judge of the United States Court of Appeals for the District of Columbia Circuit from 1986 until his death from COVID-19 in 2020.

== Early life and career ==
Williams was born in 1936 in New York City. His father, C. Dickerman Williams, was a prominent lawyer who later became the general counsel of the United States Department of Commerce. Williams graduated from Yale University in 1958 with a Bachelor of Arts, magna cum laude, where he was a member of the Manuscript Society. He then attended Harvard Law School, where he was classmates with future federal judges Anthony Kennedy, Laurence Silberman, A. Wallace Tashima, R. Lanier Anderson III, and Timothy B. Dyk. He was a member of the Harvard Law Review and graduated in 1961 with a Juris Doctor, magna cum laude.

Williams was in the United States Army Reserve as a Private E-2 from 1961 to 1962. He was in private practice at the law firm Debevoise & Plimpton from 1962 to 1966, and from 1966 to 1969 he was an Assistant United States Attorney for the Southern District of New York. From 1969 to his appointment to the bench, he taught at the University of Colorado School of Law. During this time, he also served as a visiting professor of law at UCLA, University of Chicago Law School, and Southern Methodist University and he was a consultant to the Administrative Conference of the United States and the Federal Trade Commission.

== Federal judicial service ==
Williams was nominated by President Ronald Reagan on February 19, 1986, to a seat on the United States Court of Appeals for the District of Columbia Circuit vacated by Judge Malcolm R. Wilkey. He was confirmed by the United States Senate on June 13, 1986, and received commission on June 16, 1986. He assumed senior status on September 30, 2001.

In March 2017, Williams questioned if the government could constitutionally keep all prisoner court filings secret when the court, unanimous in judgment but in divided opinions, found that the press could not access classified video of Jihad Ahmed Mustafa Dhiab being force fed during the Guantanamo Bay hunger strikes.

== Death ==
Williams was diagnosed with COVID-19 in May 2020, during the COVID-19 pandemic in Washington, D.C. He was admitted to Sibley Memorial Hospital and put on a ventilator. On August 7, 2020, after about two months in the hospital, he died from complications as a result of the virus.

== Author ==
Williams was the author of numerous books and scholarly articles. His book, Liberal Reform in an Illiberal Regime, 1906–1915: The Creation of Private Property in Russia, was described by former acting Prime Minister of Russia Yegor Gaidar as "absolutely splendid".

- The Reformer: How One Liberal Fought to Preempt the Russian Revolution, 2017
- The Natural Gas Revolution of 1985, 1985
- Cases on Oil and Gas Law (With R. Maxwell, P. Martin and B. Kramer), 6th ed., 1992
- Subjectivity, Expression & Privacy: Problems of Aesthetic Regulation, 62 Minnesota Law Review 1, 1977
- Running Out: The Problem of Exhaustible Resources, 7 Journal of Legal Studies 165, 1978
- Solar 'Access' and Property Rights: A Maverick Analysis, 11 Connecticut Law Review 430, 1979
- Implied Covenants for Development and Exploration in Oil and Gas Leases - The Determination of Profitability, 27 Kansas Law Review 443, 1979
- The Static Conception of the Common Law: A Comment, 9 Journal of Legal Studies 277, 1980
- Getting Downtown - Relief of Highway Congestion Through Pricing, Regulation, p. 45, March/April, 1981
- Implied Covenants in Oil and Gas Leases: Some General Principles, 29 Kansas Law Review 153, 1981
- An Energy Policy Perspective on Solar Hot Water Equipment Mandates, 1 UCLA Journal on Environmental Law and Policy 135, 1981
- 'Liberty' In the Due Process Clauses of the Fifth and Fourteenth Amendments: The Intentions of the Framers, 53 Colorado Law Review 117, 1981
- Severance Taxes: The Supreme Court's Role in Preserving a National Common Market for Energy Supplies, 53 Colorado Law Review 281, 1982
- Liberty and Property: The Problem of Government Benefits, 12 Journal of Legal Studies 3, 1983
- The Requirement of Beneficial Use as a Cause of Waste in Water Resource Development, 23 Natural Resource Journal 7, 1983
- Energy Policy in the Cold Light of Morning, 61 Texas Law Review 571, 1983
- Free Trade in Water Resources: Sporhase v. Nebraska ex rel. Douglas, 2 S. Ct. Economic Review 89, 1984
- Implied Covenants' Threat to the Value of Oil and Gas Reserves, 36 Institute on Oil and Gas Law and Taxation, Chapter 3, 1985
- Federal Preemption of State Conservation Laws After the Natural Gas Policy Act: A Preliminary Look, 56 Colorado Law Review 521, 1985
- The Proposed Sea-Change in Natural Gas Regulation, 6 Energy Law Journal 233, 1985
- The Law of Prior Appropriation: Possible Lessons for Hawaii 25 Natural Resource Journal 911, 1985
- The Legal Integration of Energy Markets (With Terence Daintith) Vol. 5 of Integration Through Law: Europe and the American Federal Experience, 1987
- Second Best: The Soft Underbelly of Deterrence Theory in Tort, 106 Harvard Law Review 932, 1993
- Hybrid Rulemaking, Under the Administrative Procedure Act: A Legal and Empirical Analysis, 42 University of Chicago Law Review 401, 1975
- Panel: Culpability, Restitution, and the Environment: The Vitality of Common Law Rules 21 Ecology Law Quarterly, 559, 1994
- Unconstitutional Conditions Through a Libertarian Prism Public Interest Law Review, 159, 1994
- Legal Versus Non-Legal Theory 17 Harvard Journal of Law and Public Policy, 79, Winter, 1997
- Court-Gazing: Reviews of David C. Savage, Turning Right: The Making of the REhnquist Supreme Court, and H.W. Perry, Jr., Deciding to Decide: Agenda Setting in the United States Supreme Court, 91 Michigan Law Review, 1158, 1993
- The Roots of Deference (Review of Christopher F. Edley, Jr., Administrative Law: Rethinking Judicial Control of Bureaucracy) 100 Yale Law Journal 1103, 1991
- Background Norms in the Regulatory State, (Review of Cass R. Sunstein, After the Rights Revolution: Reconceiving the Regulatory State) 58 University of Chicago Law Review 419, 1991
- Fingers in the Pie (Review of Jeremy Rabkin, Judicial Compulsions: How Public Law Distorts Public Policy) 68 Texas Law Review 1303, 1990
- Review of Morton Horwitz, The Transformation of American Law, 25 UCLA Law Review 1187, 1978
- Review of Richard A. Posner, Economic Analysis of Law, 45 University of Colorado Law Review 437–53, 1974
- Fixing the Rate of Return After Duquesne, 8 Yale Journal on Reg. 159, 1991
- Pollution Control: Taxes v. Regulation (International Institute for Economic Research, Original Paper 23), August, 1979
- Optimizing Water Use: The Return Flow Issue, 44 University of Colorado Law Review 301, 1973
- Risk Regulation and Its hazards: Review of Stephen Breyer, Breaking the Vicious Circle, 93 Mich. L. Rev. 1498, 1995
- Deregulatory Takings and Breach of the Regulatory Contract: A Comment 71 N.Y.U. L. Rev. 1000, 1996

== Sources ==
Legal offices
Preceded by Malcolm Richard Wilkey	Judge of the United States Court of Appeals for the District of Columbia Circuit; 1986–2001	Succeeded by Janice Rogers Brown
