= Richard W. Butler =

U.S. Navy aviator and officer

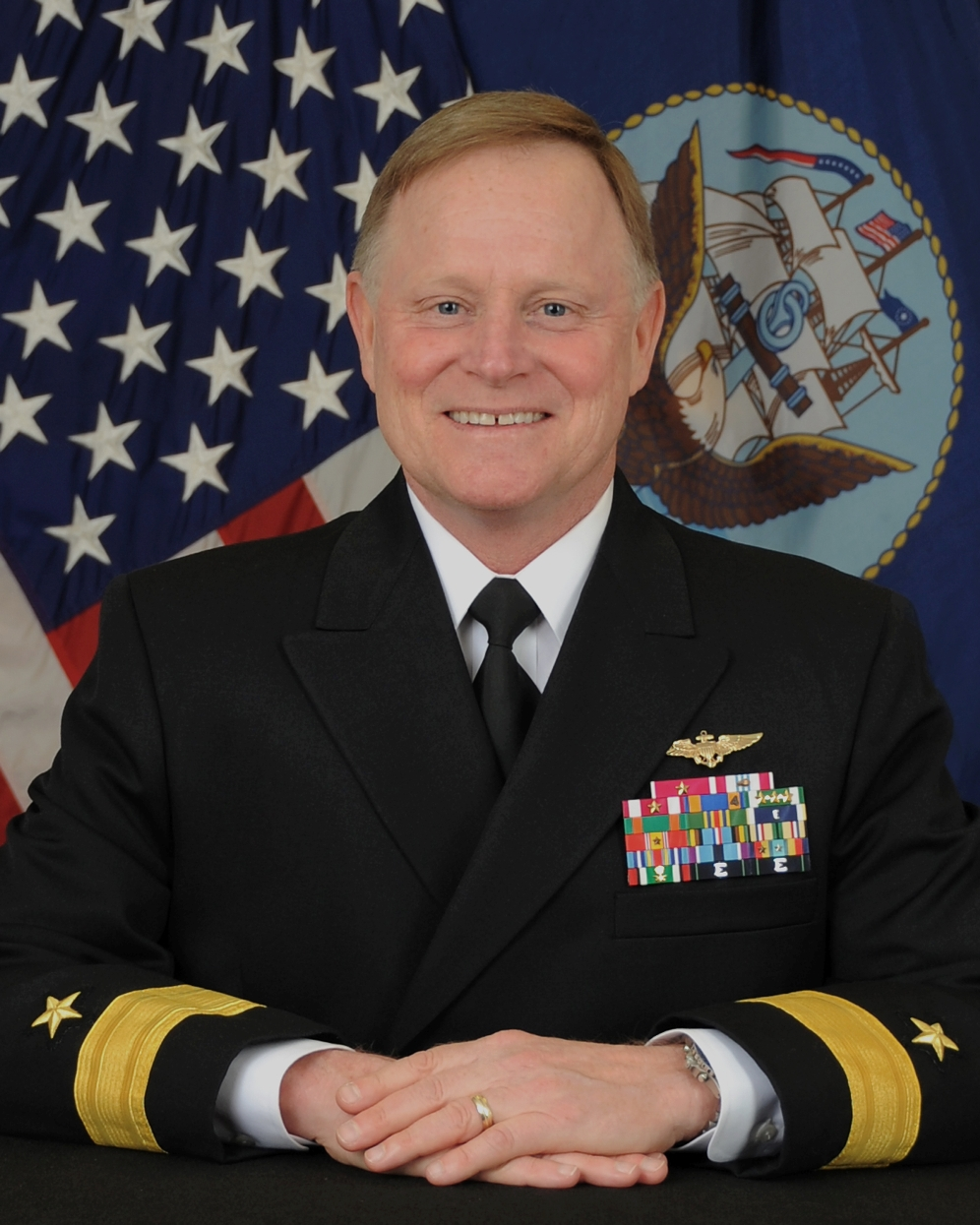
- Born: Richard Wallace Butler; 1959 (age 66–67)
- Military career
- Branch: United States Navy
- Service years: 1982–2016
- Rank: Rear Admiral Lower Half
- Commands: VFA-25; CVW-14; Joint Task Force Guantanamo; Carrier Strike Group 4

Richard W. Butler is a retired aviator and officer in the United States Navy.

He was the commandant of Joint Task Force Guantanamo from July 2013 to July 2014.

Butler went on record as supporting President Barack Obama's plan to close the detention camp.

Butler later served as the commanding officer of Carrier Strike Group 4 before retiring from active duty in 2016.

Earlier in his career, Butler commanded Strike Fighter Squadron 25 and Carrier Air Wing 14.

Butler is a 1982 graduate of the University of Kentucky. He later earned a master's degree from the National War College.
