= Kyle Cozad =

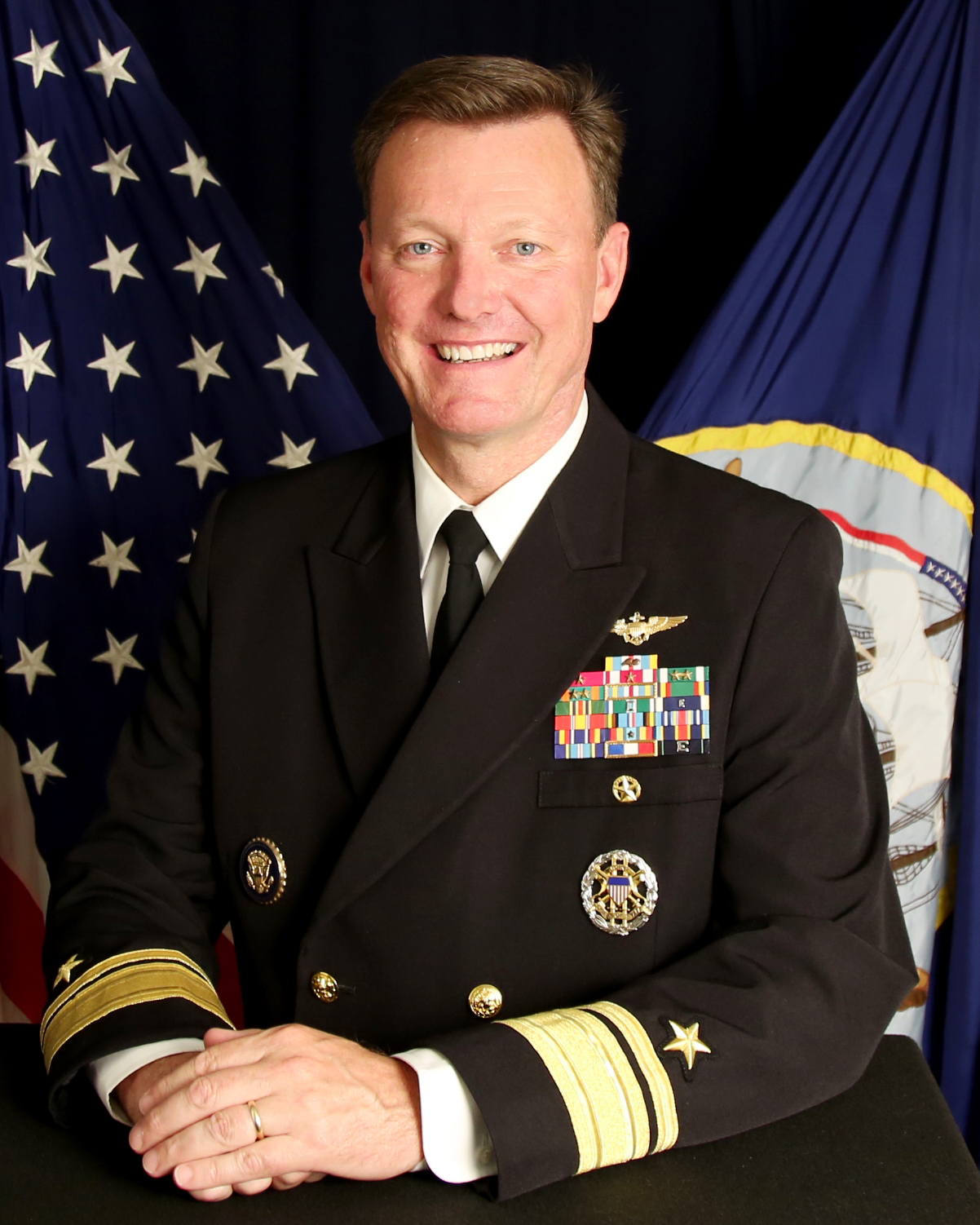
- Born: 1962 (age 63–64)
- Allegiance: United States
- Branch: United States Navy
- Service years: 1985–2020
- Rank: Rear Admiral (Upper Half)
- Commands: Chief of Naval Education and Training; Patrol and Reconnaissance Group; Joint Task Force Guantanamo; Patrol and Reconnaissance Wing 11; Patrol Squadron 40
- Awards: Defense Superior Service Medal (2); Legion of Merit (2); Meritorious Service Medal (2); Navy and Marine Corps Commendation Medal (3); Navy and Marine Corps Achievement Medal (3)

Kyle James Cozad (born 1962) is a retired United States Navy rear admiral who was the former Chief of Naval Education and Training from 2017 to 2020.

He was the commander of Joint Task Force Guantanamo from July 2014 to June 2015.

== Education ==
Raised in Las Vegas, Cozad attended the United States Naval Academy, graduating with a B.S. degree in oceanography and physics and an ensign's commission in 1985. He later earned an M.S. degree in national resource management from the Eisenhower School at the National Defense University.

== Personal life ==
In March 2018, Cozad suffered an accidental fall in his kitchen, resulting in two vertebrae being crushed. Despite surgery to correct the injury, he lost all feeling below his waist and was told he would be a paraplegic for life. He began physical rehabilitation for the injury and also began participating in adaptive sports in order to remain physically active. In February 2019, he attended a Navy-sponsored adaptive sports camp. He subsequently tried out for and was selected to the 40-member team representing the Navy in the 2019 Warrior Games.
