= Camp Five Echo =

Part of the Guantanamo Bay detention camps

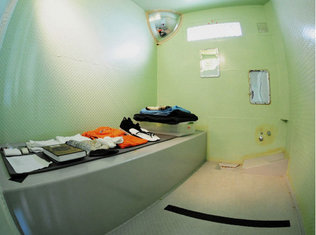
A wide-angle view of a cell in Camp Five Echo taken by a navy photographer released by the detention center, which stated that the photograph was taken 8 Dec. 2011.

Camp Five Echo is a once secret "disciplinary block" built as part of the Guantanamo Bay detention camps, in Cuba. The press first reported on the existence of the camp in December 2011 when attorneys for Shaker Aamer, who had been held at the camp for extended periods of time, complained that conditions there were inhumane.

According to Carol Rosenberg, writing in the Miami Herald, the camp is used to punish captives. Like Camp Platinum, Camp Strawberry Fields and Camp No, Camp Five Echo had never been mentioned when journalists and other visitors are given tours of the internment facility.

== Construction history ==
Rosenberg reported the camp was constructed in November 2007, on the grounds of Camp Five. However, unlike Camp Five and Camp Six, which are copies of prisons designed for the United States Bureau of Prisons, Camp Five Echo is built out of recycled shipping containers.

According to Rosenberg a February 2009 report prepared by Admiral Patrick Walsh, on overall compliance with the Geneva Conventions, described the camp as "an open air facility with 24 individual adjoining steel mesh cells arranged in two parallel and equal rows." Walsh wrote that captives were first held in Camp Five Echo in April 2008. Rosenberg wrote that she did not know when the mesh walls were replaced with steel plates. A military spokesman said the cells in "Five Echo" are only half the size of the ones in Camp Five, but he asserted this was still within the acceptable range of sizes.

Like the original Camp Xray the cells were equipped with a squat toilet. Water for washing was via a tap in the wall—captives had no wash basin.

Captives, like Shaker Aamer, have told their attorneys that the solid steel walls made it practically impossible for them to talk with one another.

On 2011 Rosenberg reported about the cost and other details of the camp, obtained from an email sent by camp spokesperson Commander Tamsen Reese. The camp cost $690,000. Walsh's report said that captives had been first held in the camp in April 2008.

== Use ==
Admiral Walsh's report said the camp was first used on 28 April 2008. Attorney David Remes who said that, in addition to Shaker Aamer, two more of his clients were sent there, said the condition in the camp violate the Geneva Conventions and called it "a throwback to the bad old days at Guantánamo." Aamer had been held in solitary confinement in the camp for over 100 days when camp authorities revealed its existence.

Colonel Donnie Thomas, commander of the camp's guards, said the Camp Five Echo was "...safe, humane and meets all the regulations." While he declined to say what kinds of infractions caused captives to be sent to Camp Five Echo, he did say where they were held was based on their compliance with camp rules, "Quite frankly, detainees make the determination where they live." Shortly after Aamer's four and half month stay in the camp triggered the publication of the photo, Thomas said that the camp was currently empty, but declined to say at that time when it had last been used. Camp rules only permit captives to be kept in solitary confinement for a maximum of thirty days.

Another of Aamer's lawyers Ramzi Kaseem, said Aamer described the condition as "abysmal", "the squat toilet is difficult to use, there are foul odors, bright lights shine on detainees, and air conditioners keep it extremely cold.", "It is decrepit, filthy, and disgusting". Aamer also told Kaseem the cells were not large enough to pray.

In an article marking the tenth anniversary of the opening of the Guantanamo internment facility Rosenberg reported tensions were high. Captives were planning a hunger strike. Captives reported camp authorities had "instituted a new 25-day punitive segregation regime for rule breakers in a cramped cell at the once-secret Camp 5 Echo."

In May 2012 Kassem reported that the controversial sleep deprivation technique known as the frequent flyer program was being used as a punishment technique in Camp Five Echo.
