= Guantanamo Bay homicide accusations =

Events about prisoner deaths

Guantanamo Bay homicide accusations were made regarding the deaths of three prisoners on June 10, 2006, at the United States Guantanamo Bay detention camp for enemy combatants at its naval base in Cuba. Two of the men had been cleared by the military for release. The United States Department of Defense (DoD) claimed their deaths at the time as suicides, although their families and the Saudi government argued against the findings, and numerous journalists have raised questions then and since. The DOD undertook an investigation by the Naval Criminal Investigative Service (NCIS), published in redacted form in 2008.

In April 2008, Murat Kurnaz, a former detainee released without charges and repatriated to Germany, published the English translation of his memoir, Five Years of My Life: An Innocent Man in Guantánamo (2007). In it he discussed the deaths of the three detainees in June 2006, as described by other prisoners from their cell block. Given the conditions at the camp and constant observation by guards, he and the other prisoners had "unanimously" concluded that the three detainees had been killed, perhaps by beating or strangling.

Following release of the redacted NCIS investigative report in August 2008, which reaffirmed the DOD conclusions of suicide, Seton Hall University Law School's Center for Policy and Research published Death in Camp Delta (December 2009), a report criticizing the Department of Defense account for inconsistencies and weaknesses. It suggested there was serious negligence at the camp, or potential cover-up of homicides resulting from torture.

In January 2010, Harper's Magazine and NBC News released the report of a joint investigation, based on accounts by four former Military Intelligence staff, stationed at the time at Guantanamo. They suggested the military under the Bush administration had covered up deaths of the men that occurred under torture at a "black site" known as Camp No or Camp 7 in the course of interrogations. In 2011, Scott Horton's article on the Guantanamo events won the National Magazine Awards for Reporting. The award revived a round of criticism of the article, including from a publication normally associated with the advertising industry.

== Background ==
On 10 June 2006, three prisoners (Mani al-Utaybi, age 30; Yasser al-Zahrani, age 21; and Ali Abdullah Ahmed, age 37) died in the Guantanamo Bay detainment camp. Their cases had been reviewed and al-Utaybi was less than three weeks away from being transferred to Saudi Arabia. Al-Zahrani was on a list of detainees to be repatriated, also to Saudi Arabia. The Washington Post carried a quote from a Combatant Status Review Tribunal review of Ahmed's case, which said there was no evidence of terrorist involvement. As Ahmed was from Yemen, the "difficult diplomatic relations" between his country and the US were delaying his repatriation.

The Pentagon informed the media that three detainees had been found dead, having "killed themselves in an apparent suicide pact". U.S. president George W. Bush expressed "serious concern" about their deaths.

Rear Admiral Harry Harris, commander of the Joint Task Force Guantanamo, said the men were dedicated terrorists and jihadists. He described the deaths as "an act of asymmetric warfare committed against us." The three prisoners, two Saudis and one Yemeni, were reported to have hanged themselves in their cells with nooses made of sheets and clothes, and gone undetected by guards until after they died. All three were former hunger-strikers who had been force-fed at times during detention.

The government immediately ordered an investigation, which was undertaken by the Naval Criminal Investigative Service (NCIS). Their report was released publicly in 2008, in a heavily redacted form. It found that conditions at the camp needed to be changed, but no guards or officers were prosecuted for any reason.

== Suspicions emerge ==
The Seattle Post-Intelligencer reported that news of the deaths raised skepticism as to whether the Saudi men really killed themselves.

All three of the families of the dead men challenged the American post-mortems at the time, and the Saudi government announced its suspicions that the true story was not being told. The families all took steps to have second post-mortems done after the bodies were returned to them.

Patrice Mangin, the Swiss pathologist who headed the team that volunteered to examine Al Salami's body, said that it was routine to remove some organs before autopsy - those that decay rapidly. Some family members had expressed concerns that the bodies had been returned to them missing the brain, liver, kidney heart and other organs. But, Mangin said that the US authorities had kept the organs of Al-Salami's throat, that is, the larynx, hyoid bone and thyroid. His team could not state an opinion as to whether the man had hanged himself without reviewing these, as they may have revealed another cause of asphyxiation. Despite his repeated requests, the US government never provided these organs.

== Accounts dispute DOD NCIS report ==
=== Murat Kurnaz account ===
Murat Kurnaz is a former detainee who was released without charges in August 2006. He is a Turkish-born German resident who was eighteen when captured and is now a German citizen. His memoir of his experience, Five Years of My Life: An Innocent Man in Guantanamo (2008) was published in the German, French, Norwegian, Danish and Dutch languages in 2007. Excerpts were published serially by The Guardian beginning April 23, 2008.

In his book, Kurnaz wrote about his being tortured under interrogation, including waterboarding. He also wrote about the deaths of the three detainees in custody on June 10, 2006. Fellow prisoners knew that al-Utaybi had been told he was being released, and Kurnaz said he was happy about it. Given the conditions at the camp and in the cells, where the detainees were always under observation, Kurnaz said that he and other prisoners "unanimously agreed, the men had been killed. Maybe they had been beaten to death and then strung up, or perhaps they had been strangled."

=== NCIS report ===
In August 2008, the Naval Criminal Investigative Service (NCIS) publicly released a heavily redacted version of its investigative report on the 2006 suicides. It reiterated the account of suicide of each of the three men and attributed their deaths to lax conditions at the camp for compliant prisoners. It said suicide notes had been found and papers that suggested planning for joint suicides.

The NCIS report said that the detainees had rags in their throats. Both the Department of Defense (DoD) and the Department of Justice (DOJ) had previously stated that only one detainee had a rag in his throat. The NCIS described the detainees bonds as loose and easily tied by the prisoners, and said that they did not have to climb to the sinks for hanging. Because of the gravity of the events, the NCIS said the guards were expected to wait for NCIS investigators to give their statements (this is standard operating procedure (SOP) when criminal actions are possible). The NCIS report notes that numerous guards, detainees and medical personnel attested to seeing the deceased being transferred from the cellblock to the infirmary. Video records of the cellblock (which did not show the interiors of the cells) did not reveal anything amiss.

=== Seton Hall University School of Law report ===
On 7 December 2009, the Seton Hall University School of Law's Center for Policy and Research published Death in Camp Delta, its 15th study based on research by a team supervised by Mark Denbeaux, who is also the attorney for two Guantanamo detainees. The report contended that the NCIS 2008 investigation did not support the conclusion that these men committed suicide by hanging themselves inside their cells. It noted flaws and inconsistencies in the government's investigation of the three deaths and the NCIS report The Death in Camp Delta report raised serious questions about the security of the Camp.

The report notes that, according to the government's autopsies, the detainees must have been

hanging unobserved for a minimum of two hours. The deaths went unnoticed despite the constant supervision of five guards who were responsible for only 28 inmates in a lit cell block monitored by video cameras. According to Standard Operating Procedures (SOPs), each detainee should have been observed a minimum of once every 10 minutes by the guards. Despite clear violations of the SOP, no guards were ever disciplined.

As the report notes, in order to have committed suicide by hanging, the detainees had to:

- "Braid a noose by tearing up their sheets and/or clothing
- Make mannequins of themselves so it would appear to the guards they were asleep in their cells
- Hang sheets to block the view into the cells, in violation of SOPs
- Stuff rags down their own throats
- Tie their own feet together
- Tie their own hands together
- Hang the noose from the metal mesh of the cell wall and/or ceiling
- Climb up on to the sink, put the noose around their necks and release their weight, resulting in death by strangulation
- Hang dead for at least two hours completely unnoticed by guards."

According to Denbeaux, during the initial investigation, guards on duty were warned against giving false statements and were read their Miranda rights. Denbeaux noted that these guards were ordered not to write sworn statements, although SOPs require that they should.

Paul W. Taylor, a Seton Hall Law student and former Sergeant in the 82nd Airborne Division, is a co-author of the report. He said,

We have three dead bodies and no explanation. How is it possible that all three detainees had shoved rags so far down their own throats that medical personnel could not remove them? One of the dead detainees was scheduled for release from Guantanamo Bay in 19 days. Instead he died in custody. The American public and the families of the dead deserve to know the truth.

Journalists including Scott Horton, Glenn Greenwald, and Andrew Sullivan said that the Center report suggests that officials of multiple defense and intelligence agencies had allowed the deaths by negligence and had not conducted a proper investigation, or have tried to manage a cover-up.

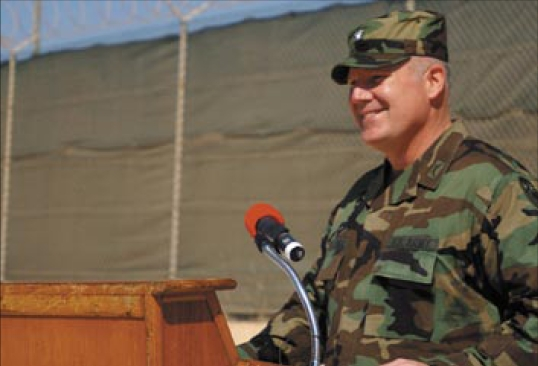
Michael Bumgarner, commander of Camp America and head of the guard forces at the time of the alleged suicides

=== Scott Horton investigation ===
In January 2010, Harper's Magazine published an article resulting from a joint investigation with NBC News and written by Scott Horton. Based an account by four members of the Military Intelligence unit assigned to guard Camp Delta, it contradicted the NCIS 2008 report. The guards included a junior NCO with one Commendation Medal, who was on duty as the sergeant supervising the other guards. Their account suggests that the three prisoners who died on June 9, 2006, had been transported to another location (believed to be "Camp "No", a black site outside the main camp boundaries and never discussed) prior to their deaths, and brought to the medical center from that location, not their cell block. It suggests that the deaths were either the result of serious negligence in treatment of prisoners under "enhanced interrogation techniques," or that the three were tortured so badly that they died.

Colonel Michael Bumgarner, then commander of Camp America and head of the guard forces, said shortly after the events that each of the prisoners had had a ball of cloth in his mouth, either to induce choking or to muffle the voice. (Scheduled for rotation already, he was stripped of his command early shortly after his public comments.) The NCIS report had acknowledged that the bodies of the three men showed signs of torture, including hemorrhages, needle marks, and significant bruising. The government retained the throat organs (larynx, hyoid bone), which were removed prior or during the autopsy conducted by pathologists affiliated with the Armed Forces Institute of Pathology when they sent the men's bodies to their home countries. This made it impossible for the pathologists who conducted second autopsies for the families of the dead men to determine whether the men were already dead when their bodies were suspended by nooses.

The four soldiers, including Army Staff Sergeant Joseph Hickman, said all of the guards had been ordered by their commanding officer Bumgarner not to speak out about the events, and that he had advised them what DOD was going to release to the press. The four soldiers provided evidence that authorities initiated a cover-up within hours of the prisoners' deaths. At the time, the NCIS investigators seized all written material possessed by the prisoners in Camp America, which comprised some 1,065 pounds of material, including privileged attorney-client correspondence.

Horton's article includes an account by Shaker Aamer, a detainee and legal resident of Britain. His lawyer, Zachary Katznelson, had filed an affidavit in federal court in which Aamer said that he had been taken to the black site on 9 June 2006, where he was beaten and nearly asphyxiated. This was the same evening that the three prisoners died. Aamer said that during his interrogation, he was strapped to a chair, fully restrained at the head, arms and legs. MPs pressed on pressure points all over his body. They also inflicted pain to his eyes, bent his fingers until he screamed and then pressed against his throat and put a mask over him so he could not cry out. He said he could hardly breathe. Although Aamer was cleared for repatriation to Britain in 2009, he was not released from Guantanamo until 2015. He was held for almost 15 years without charge or trial. He is the last British resident to be held there.

Following Horton's article, the British organization Reprieve, which represents numerous Guantanamo detainees, called again for the US government under President Barack Obama to conduct a new investigation of the incident. In response, the DOJ spokeswoman Laura Sweeney said it disputed certain facts in the article related to the soldiers' account of DOJ involvement. The administration said that the Pentagon had thoroughly investigated the events.

=== Joseph Hickman account ===
Joseph Hickman, Sergeant of the Guard on the night of the 2006 incident, was in charge of several posts guarded by other soldiers. Much of Hickman's account has been published in the 2010 Harper's Magazine article which contradicted the NCIS 2008 report. In a 15 January 2015 interview on Democracy Now, Hickman replied to criticisms made by NCIS that he could not have observed the activities surrounding the incident because he was a perimeter guard and not even working within the compound. Hickman denies this assertion saying that while he was "in the unique position I had where I was in the camp and outside the camp on certain duties", on the night of the alleged suicides he was inside of the camp and able to view the activities going on outside of the Camp One building that housed the detainees and 35 to 40 feet from the medical clinic as well.

Hickman states that he first became "suspicious" when he saw Admiral Harris on CNN reporting that there had been a suicide in which three men had hanged themselves. According to Hickman, since neither he nor any of the guards working under him had seen any men from Camp One transferred to the medical center he "knew right away that no one hung themselves in Camp One." He said that he assumed that he would be interviewed by NCIS; he was never interviewed nor were "the guards that were in the towers in the area or the sally port guards that were literally 25 meters away at most from the medical clinic." Hickman has written a recently published book, Murder at Camp Delta: A Staff Sergeant's Pursuit of the Truth About Guantánamo Bay.

== Criticism ==
Jack Shafer, in Slate magazine, wrote that Horton, "lends unwarranted credence to the eyewitness testimony of Guantánamo guards-turned-whistleblowers and conflates hearsay and speculation into 'evidence' while blithely ignoring facts and statements collected by the government." He did not believe it made a strong case for claiming the men had died from torture or that the government had covered up the nature of their deaths.

In 2011, Horton's article won a National Magazine Award. Together with articles noting the fifth anniversary of the detainees' deaths at Guantanamo, there was a revival of published controversy about the topic. Adweek, a publication normally devoted to the advertising industry, published an article critical of Horton's account. In it, Alex Koppelman claimed that many news media had passed on the story by the guards, but quoted only one source as to his reasons, who said he doubted its credibility. As the journalists Andy Worthington and Jeff Kaye noted in rebuttal, journalists may have many reasons to pass on a story, not least the desire to preserve relations with contacts of an organization as important to their work as the Department of Defense.

== Dryboarding and the Guantanamo deaths ==
In October 2011, Ali Saleh al-Marri, a terrorist suspect tried in the federal court system and convicted in a plea bargain, reported having been subjected to an interrogation technique called "dry-boarding" in a US Navy prison brig. After being arrested at graduate school, Ali Saleh al-Marri, a legal resident of the United States, was held in a Navy brig in the USA. He described during interrogation as having had rags stuffed down his throat, and then having his mouth and nose taped shut. This technique has been described as dry-boarding, intended to gain the cooperation of interrogation subjects through inducing the first stages of death by asphyxiation.

Almerindo Ojeda, director of the Center for the Study of Human Rights in the Americas, said, "The dryboarding of Mr. al-Marri raises an unavoidable question,... Did the three individuals found hanging in Guantanamo die from dryboarding rather than by hanging?"

== See also ==
- Guantanamo suicide attempts
