= Michael Bumgarner =

US Army officer (born 1959)

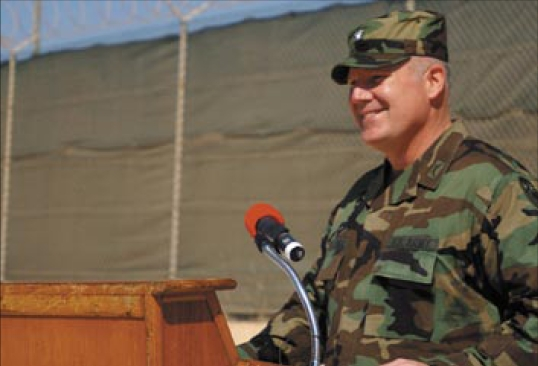
- Born: 1959 (age 66–67)
- Military career
- Allegiance: United States
- Branch: United States Army
- Rank: Colonel
- Unit: Joint Task Force Guantanamo

Michael Bumgarner (born 1959) is an American former career officer in the military police of the United States Army. He was the commander of the Joint Detention Group, the guard force component of Joint Task Force Guantanamo, from April 2005 through June 2006, at the Guantanamo Bay detention camp. During this period there was a widespread hunger strike in 2005, which he helped end. On June 10, 2006, three detainees were found dead, in what the United States Department of Defense announced as suicides. Bumgarner had other assignments after Guantanamo and retired from the military in 2010.

In 2009 a report by Seton Hall University Law School criticized the DOD NCIS investigative account of the deaths as full of inconsistencies and errors. In a joint investigation by Harper's Magazine and NBC News, a January 2010 article by Scott Horton asserted that Bumgarner and other senior military personnel at Guantanamo and in the Department of Defense participated in a cover-up of homicides of the three detainees, resulting from severe interrogations at a black site outside the main camp. The issue has not been conclusively settled.

== Early life and education ==
Michael Bumgarner is the son of a career army sergeant major and his wife, in a family that valued military service. By high school, he was living in Kings Mountain, North Carolina. Although he was admitted to West Point, Bumgarner left during the first year. He joined the ROTC to help in his college education at Western Carolina University, and entered the army after college.

== Career ==
In April 2005 Bumgarner was assigned as commander of the Joint Detention Group, the guard force component of Joint Task Force Guantanamo, under Major General Jay W. Hood, serving into June 2006. Hood told him to think about how to get the camp more in compliance with the Third Geneva Convention, related to treatment of prisoners of war. The Bush administration had originally classified the detainees as illegal enemy combatants outside the convention. Bumgarner took on his new assignment in the wake of the Abu Ghraib prisoner torture and abuse scandal in Iraq, which had been revealed in the spring of 2004.

When Bumgarner arrived at Guantanamo, much about the detainees' legal status was unsettled. At the time, 530 detainees were held there and most had been classified as "noncompliant." In Rasul v. Bush (2004), the United States Supreme Court had ruled that detainees had the right to habeas corpus, and could challenge their detentions. No military commissions had yet been held. Hundreds of detainees were held at the camp, many since early in 2002. Bumgarner worked to reduce tensions at the camp between the guards and detainees, for instance, supplying bottled water because of complaints about the tap water.

In the summer, detainees started a widespread hunger strike, protesting conditions at the camp and, especially, demanding "fair trials or freedom." Bumgarner was the chief American negotiator during talks that ended the strike on July 28, 2005. Detainees have said that Bumgarner made promises of improvements in treatment and conditions that the camp administration later failed to fulfill.

On June 10, 2006, the United States Department of Defense announced three detainees were found dead, in what were announced as suicides. Bumgarner was quoted a few days later saying of the detainees: "The trust level is gone. They have shown time and time again that we can't trust them any farther than we can throw them. There is not a trustworthy son of a ... in the entire bunch."

An investigation by DOD by the NCIS cleared personnel of any wrongdoing but made recommendations for changes in treatment of detainees. It was released by DOD in 2008 in a heavily redacted form.

After Guantanamo, Bumgarner was assigned as the director of the Maneuver Support Center, Capabilities Development and Integration Directorate, Fort Leonard Wood, Missouri. He was responsible for developing new concepts for the army to help protect the force. He served as the senior US advisor to the Baghdad Police College while serving in the Civilian Police Training Team (CPATT) from 2007 to 2008.

Bumgarner's final position from 2008 to 2010 was as the professor of military science for the Army ROTC program at Virginia Tech.

== Disputes allegations of cover-up ==
In 2009, Seton Hall University Law School published a report, Death in Camp Delta, that was highly critical of the NCIS investigation and noted many inconsistencies in the DOD account. This was one of numerous reports which had been published by the Law School's Center for Policy and Research, which analyzed issues related to Guantanamo and the detainees. The report suggested that the camp had been grossly negligent, or that officers had made a cover-up of accidental death, perhaps resulting from torture during interrogation.

In January 2010, Scott Horton, a journalist and human rights attorney, published an article in Harper's Magazine asserting that the three detainees did not hang themselves as claimed by DOD in June 2006, but died under harsh interrogations at "Camp No". This was the result of a joint investigation with NBC News. "Camp No" was described as a black site outside the boundaries of the main camp. The investigation was based on interviews with four former guards, including a Camp Delta sergeant, who had been serving at Guantanamo at the time. They said that the detainees had been taken to the medical center not from their cellblock, but appeared to have been brought from the black site. Horton wrote that Bumgarner had participated in a major cover-up at the camp, in which top officers had been involved. The guards recounted that when Bumgarner briefed them at 7:00 a.m., hours after the men's deaths, he said the men had died because of rags stuffed down their throats, but the press would be told that the men hanged themselves. The guards were told not to contradict the DOD account.

On January 18, 2010, Bumgarner disputed Horton's assertions. According to the Associated Press, Bumgarner stated in an email: "this blatant misrepresentation of the truth infuriates me." According to the Associated Press, Bumgarner asserted he wanted to refute the story in more detail, but would have to get clearance from his superiors first.

== See also ==
- Shaker Aamer
- Guantanamo Bay detention camp suicide attempts
- Guantanamo Bay homicide accusations
