= Mani Shaman Turki al-Habardi Al-Utaybi =

Saudi Arabian Guantanamo Bay detainee

- Born: 1976; Al Qarara, Saudi Arabia
- Died: June 10, 2006; Guantanamo
- Detained at: Guantanamo
- Other name: Mana Shaman Allabardi al Tabi
- ISN: 588
- Status: Died in custody, Bush Presidency claimed due to suicide.

Mani Shaman Turki al-Habardi Al-Utaybi (1976 – June 10, 2006) was a citizen of Saudi Arabia, who was arrested in 2001 in Pakistan and held in extrajudicial detention in the United States Guantanamo Bay detainment camps, in Cuba from early 2002. Al-Utaybi died in custody on June 10, 2006. The Department of Defense reported his death and those of two other detainees the same day as suicides.

There were questions at the time about the conclusions, and each of the men's families disputed these. In 2009 Seton Hall University Law School published a report noting inconsistencies in the DOD account and questioning its conclusions. In January 2010, Harper's Magazine carried an article by Scott Horton that contended DOD had carried out a cover-up and that the detainees had died in the course of or due to severe interrogation at a black site known as "Camp No". The account was based on the testimony of four soldiers who had been serving at Delta Camp at the time.

== Background ==
Mani Shaman Turki al-Habardi Al-Utaybi was born in 1976 in Al Qarara, Saudi Arabia. He was orphaned early and grew up with his uncle and cousins in Dawadmi.

At the age of 20, Al-Utaybi went to Afghanistan in late 2001 after the United States (US) and allies invaded to try to overthrown the Taliban following the 9/11 attacks in the US. One of his cousins said that he had gone to do humanitarian work and had been sold to the Americans for a bounty of $5,000.

Al-Utaybi had been arrested while traveling disguised as a woman in a burqa, with four other men, at a Pakistani checkpoint. He was treated as an enemy combatant and transported to the Guantanamo Bay detention camp.

== Death in custody ==
On June 10, 2006, the Department of Defense reported that three Guantanamo detainees: two Saudis, and one Yemeni, had committed suicide. DOD spokesmen refrained from releasing the dead men's identities.

On June 11, 2006, Saudi authorities released the names of the two Saudi men. Some reports identified one of the dead Saudis as Maniy bin Shaman al-Otaibi. Other reports identified that man as Mani bin Shaman bin Turki al Habradi. The Washington Post reported in 2006 after the deaths that Al-Utaybi had been recommended for "transfer" to another country, which meant he would have been continued to be held in guarded detention. The DOD did not state to which country he would have been transferred. However, they said he would have continued to have been held in detention. The Washington Post reported: "Lieutenant Commander Robert Durand, a spokesman for the Guantanamo detention center, said he did not know whether al-Utaybi had been informed about the transfer recommendation before he killed himself."

On June 13, 2006, various sources quoted human rights lawyer Mark Denbeaux of Seton Hall University, one of the principal authors of the first study on Guantanamo and director of the Center for Policy and Research, saying Al Utaybi had not been informed he had been recommended for transfer. A memoir published in 2008 by Murat Kurnaz, a former detainee, said that al-Utaybi did know and was looking forward to leaving Guantanamo.

== Legal representation ==
The DoD had initially told the press that none of the three men who killed themselves had legal representation, or had filed habeas applications. One of the lawyers who volunteered to be part of al-Utaybi's legal team, disputed this.

The lawyer said the legal team had filed a writ of habeas corpus on al-Utaybi's behalf in September 2005. He said that the DoD claimed their writ was invalid because they had spelled his name wrong. The department did not grant them the security clearances necessary to visit Al Utaybi, so they had never seen him. The lawyer said that the DoD would not deliver their mail to Al Utaybi although official policy was that detainees could not "lose mail privileges for any reason.":

Detainees cannot lose mail privileges for any reason, including as part of disciplinary action or interrogation.

== Missing organs ==
The Department of Defense returned the dead men's bodies to their families in mid-June, after al-Utaybi's family openly questioned the claims he'd committed suicide and requested his body for a second autopsy. Utaybi's family reported that the Saudi post-mortem had found that the DOD had retained his brain, heart, liver and kidneys. Each of the families had second autopsies done, but these were inconclusive. In each case, the US had kept organs of the throat, so pathology teams could not tell if the men had died by hanging or not.

== NCIS Report ==
On August 23, 2008, Josh White, writing in the Washington Post, reported the paper had received 3,000 pages of documents arising from the NCIS investigation through Freedom of Information Act requests. He reported that the NCIS report attributed the deaths of the detainees to lapses on the part of the guards who were supposed to be watching them, and to a policy of leniency for compliant captives, in terms of allowing them to do personal laundry. The report said the deaths occurred in Camp 1, a camp for compliant captives, which had since been closed. The men's bodies were said to be masked from view by guards by laundry they were allowed to hang up to dry.

== Disputed findings ==
Murat Kurnaz, a former detainee and German resident released without charges in 2006 after five years, published a memoir in English translation in spring 2008. He wrote about the deaths of the three men, and said that he and other prisoners believed the men had been killed at the camp. He said that detainees were under too much close supervision to commit suicide as described by DOD and go undetected for so long.

In December 2009, the Center for Policy and Research of Seton Hall University School of Law, under the supervision of its director, Professor Mark Denbeaux, published Death in Camp Delta, noting numerous inconsistencies in the official accounts of these deaths and suggesting that they were false. It was the fifteenth report on Guantanamo published by the center, which has done analyses based on government data.

On January 18, 2010, Scott Horton of Harper's Magazine published an article that suggested the deaths of al-Salami, al-Utaybi and al-Zahrani as accidental manslaughter during a torture session at a black site outside the camp's perimeter, and the official account of suicides as a cover-up.

== See also ==
- Salah Ali Abdullah Ahmed al-Salami
- Yasser Talal Al Zahrani
