= Azmy =

Azmy (Arabic: عزمي) is an Egyptian surname. Notable people with the surname include:

- Amir Azmy (born 1983), Egyptian retired footballer
- Baher Azmy, American lawyer and professor of law at Seton Hall University
- Nora Azmy (born 2000), Egyptian synchronized swimmer
- Zakaria Azmy (born 1938), former chief of presidential staff in Egypt

== See also ==
- Azmy Abdelwahab, Egyptian poet
- Azmy Mehelba (born 1999), Egyptian sport shooter
- Azmy Qowimuramadhoni (born 1999), Indonesian-born Azerbaijani badminton player
