= Penny Lane (Guantanamo) =

CIA facility on the Guantanamo Bay Naval Base

Coordinates: 19.907°N 75.110°W

Penny Lane was a secret CIA facility at Guantanamo Bay Naval Base. Its name was taken from the Beatles song. Another Beatles song, "Strawberry Fields Forever", was similarly appropriated in naming Camp Strawberry Fields where the CIA's most prominent detainees were to be kept "Forever".

== Overview ==
Penny Lane was used to attempt to convert particular captives into double agents who would be released to penetrate terrorist organizations and inform on them from within. According to Adam Goldman and Matt Apuzzo, of the Associated Press, Intelligence officials who insisted on anonymity asserted that the double agent program had successful graduates—individuals who were believed to be trustworthy enough to be released early, and who would then betray terrorists. However, they acknowledged that at least some of those individuals abandoned being a double agent and stopped reporting to the CIA.

In anticipation of the United States Supreme Court's ruling in Rasul v. Bush, which was going to allow access to habeas corpus for individuals held in Guantanamo, Penny Lane, and other CIA black sites, like Camp Strawberry Fields, were shut down.

The conditions of confinement were reported to have been comfortable, with every individual provided with a private suite, with a real bed, private bathroom, kitchenette, and private patio.

Following the release of the Senate Intelligence Committee's report on the CIA's use of torture, some press reports later asserted that Penny Lane remained in operation, after the CIA stopped holding its own captives there, and that it was the site Scott Horton identified as "Camp No", when three captives died under mysterious circumstances, on June 9-10, 2006.

== See also ==
- Guantanamo Bay homicide accusations
