= Camp No =

Alleged black site in Guantánamo Bay, Cuba

Camp No is an alleged secret detention and torture facility (black site) related to the United States detainment camps located in Guantánamo Bay, Cuba. On January 18, 2010, Scott Horton asserted in an article in Harper's Magazine, the result of a joint investigation with NBC News, that such a facility was maintained outside the regular boundaries of the Guantanamo Bay detention camps.

== Description ==
Estimated to be located about a mile beyond the regular camp boundaries, the camp was described as a highly secret facility referred to as "Camp No" by Guantanamo guards. When soldiers asked about it, they were told "No, it doesn't exist". The compound looked like other camps except that it was surrounded by concertina wire and had no guard towers.

The guards who told Horton about it said that it looked as if it could hold 80 prisoners. Some areas looked like the interrogation centers in other parts of the main camp. They had seen non-uniformed personnel going to that area and speculated they were CIA. They suggest that the camp was used for secret interrogations, including the use of illegal interrogation techniques, such as waterboarding torture.

In an account published in Harper's, guards attested they had seen three prisoners taken individually in the direction of Camp No by the vehicle they called the paddy wagon on the night of June 9. The paddy wagon contained a cage large enough to hold one prisoner at a time. All three had been taken there by 8 pm.

== Homicides related to Camp No ==
Horton asserts that, according to interviews he conducted with four former camp guards, Army Staff Sergeant Joseph Hickman, and three men who served under him, the three detainees reported by the military on June 10, 2006, as having committed suicide instead having likely died while at Camp No, or soon afterward, as a result of secret interrogations under torture. The DOD had announced that the three men had died in their cellblock by hanging themselves in their cells.

The Naval Criminal Investigative Service (NCIS) released a heavily redacted report in August 2008; it said that the three men's hangings had gone undetected for two hours. The detainees were Salah Ahmed Al-Salami, Mani al-Utaybi, and Yasser al-Zahrani.

Horton wrote that DOD carried out a cover-up in asserting that the deaths were the result of suicides, all carried out the same night. He said the guards reported having seen a van, used only for the transport of individual prisoners, return that night from the direction of Camp No and go directly to the medical center, where something was unloaded. There was soon much crisis-related activity. This was before 11:45 pm, more than an hour before the first bodies of the "suicides" were reportedly discovered in the cellblock. In addition, Sergeant Hickman, whose position in a tower gave him an overview of the cellblock, said that he saw no prisoners being taken from the cellblock to the medical clinic that night.

In February 2010, Brent Mickum, the lawyer for Shaker Aamer, former detainee who is a British resident, said his client had described suffering torture at a separate location outside the regular camp on June 9, 2006, when the other detainees died. He was subjected to what has been called dryboarding, which led to temporary asphyxiation. Mickum said that, from Aamer's description, he thought it "'likely' Mr Aamer's torture was in the same 'black site' area, Camp No, identified by the Harper's article." Although Aamer was cleared for release in 2009, he was only released on 30 October 2015.

== See also ==
- Strawberry Fields (Guantanamo)
