= Ali Saleh Kahlah al-Marri =

Qatari convict (born 1966/67)

Ali Saleh Kahlah Al Marri
- Born: 1966/1967; Qatar
- Children: Five
- Status: Released
- Conviction: Plea bargain - pled guilty to one count of conspiracy to provide material support to a foreign terrorist organization
- Penalty: 8 years

Ali Saleh Kahlah al-Marri (Arabic: علي صالح كحلة المري ) (b. 1966–1967) is a citizen of Qatar who was sentenced to serve an 8-year sentence in a United States federal prison. He pleaded guilty to one count in a plea bargain after his case was transferred in 2009 to the federal court system.

Al-Marri was a graduate student at Bradley University and a legal resident of the United States when arrested in December 2001 in Illinois by the federal government. Two years after his arrest, he was indicted on charges of credit card fraud, but in 2003, he was classified as an enemy combatant and transferred to military custody. He was detained for six years at the Naval Consolidated Brig at Charleston, South Carolina, in solitary confinement. He is the only non-citizen known to have been held as an enemy combatant within the continental United States since the September 11 attacks.

In Al-Marri v. Wright (2008), the Fourth Circuit Court of Appeals determined that, as a legal resident arrested in the United States, he was entitled to contest his detention in federal court. It ruled that he needed to be charged and tried, or released. The Supreme Court agreed to certiorari.

After a change in administrations, in 2009, the government transferred al-Marri's case to the Department of Justice and the federal civilian court system, making it moot at the Supreme Court. In a plea agreement, al-Marri pleaded guilty to one count of conspiracy to provide material support to a foreign terrorist organization on April 30, 2009.

== Early life and education ==
Ali Saleh Kahlah al-Marri was born in Qatar in 1966 or 1967, as estimated by the United States government. He came to the United States to go to graduate school and was a legal resident. He attended Bradley University, a small private college in Peoria, Illinois.

Before coming to the United States, Al Marri is believed to have worked for nearly a decade as a "key person" in the audit department of Qatar Islamic Bank and then as a senior auditor for the government of Qatar.

== Arrest ==
The Peoria Journal Star reports that al-Marri's initial arrest in December 2001 was at a routine traffic stop in Peoria, Illinois. He was held by federal authorities in civilian jails in Peoria and New York City as a material witness.

In 2002, the government charged Al-Marri with making false statements to the FBI and to financial institutions, identity fraud, and credit card fraud. He was alleged to be in possession of more than 1750 credit card numbers, along with the names of the account holders, none of which were his. He was also alleged to be in possession of falsified identification documents. Additionally, he was alleged to have used a telephone card to call a number in Dubai linked to Mustafa al-Hawsawi, a reputed al-Qaeda financier.

After searching al-Marri's computer, federal agents found folders labeled "jihad arena" and "chem," which contained information on hydrogen cyanide. This is a poisonous gas produced in large quantities in the U.S. and is among chemical warfare agents that cause general poisoning. They also reportedly found lectures by Osama bin Laden and links to websites related to weaponry and satellite equipment.

After the Bush administration classified al-Marri as an "enemy combatant" in 2003, it dropped those federal charges and transferred him to military custody at Naval Consolidated Brig, in Charleston, South Carolina. He had been arrested while a legal resident of the United States.

== Enemy combatant ==
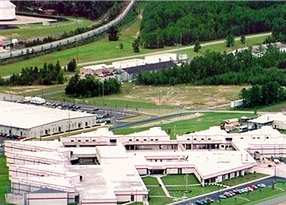
Aerial view of the Navy Consolidated Brig, in South Carolina, where Al Marri was held.

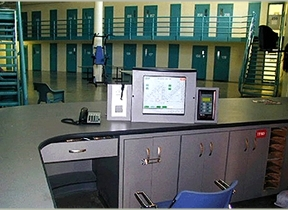
Cell blocks in the Navy consolidated brig. An entire wing was reportedly devoted to Al Marris's detention.

Following the US Supreme Court decision in Rasul v. Bush (2004), which said that detainees had the right to challenge their detention, Al-Marri was allowed access to legal counsel in October 2004. His lawyers reported that al-Marri has described being subjected to extreme cold, with insufficient bedding and clothing. He has been deprived of all reading material except a Qur'an. His guards reportedly decline to inform him of which direction is East, which he needs for prayers. His cell's window is translucent (rather than transparent), and he has no clock, so he cannot know the proper times to say prayers. He reports having been deprived of personal hygiene items. The lack of such items have caused him to be unable to pray, because of ritual impurity.

In October 2004, Al-Marri told his lawyer that he had not been interrogated for a year. His lawyer sought to challenge his detention by a writ of habeas corpus.

In October 2008, the military released 91 pages of memos drafted in 2002 by officers at the Naval Consolidated Brig, Charleston, which showed that they had been concerned for the sanity of Al-Marri and other detainees confined to solitary. The memos indicate that officers were concerned that the mental states of the detainees Ali Saleh Kahlah al-Marri, Yasser Hamdi and José Padilla due to their isolation and lack of stimuli.

On November 13, 2006, the United States Department of Justice asserted in a six-page motion with the United States Court of Appeals for the Fourth Circuit that, according to the Military Commissions Act of 2006, al-Marri should be tried in a military tribunal as an enemy combatant rather than in a civilian court. It said that the Military Commissions Act of 2006 removed federal court jurisdiction for habeas corpus or any other actions related to aliens determined by the US to be "enemy combatants."

After a long legal battle, the federal government released the previously classified justification for Al Marri's detention as an enemy combatant. On September 9, 2004, Jeffrey N. Rapp, Director of the Joint Intelligence Task Force for Combating Terrorism, had submitted a 16-page sworn statement containing many allegations against Al Marri, including:

- Al Marri was to hack into the US banking system, and "to wipe out balances and otherwise wreak havoc with banking records in order to damage the U.S. economy."
- Investigator had found information about hydrogen cyanide on Al Marri's laptop ... "The highly technical information found on al-Marri's laptop computer far exceeds the interests of a merely curious individual."

On June 11, 2007, in al-Marri v. Wright, the Fourth Circuit Court of Appeals ruled that the Military Commissions Act of 2006 cannot deny al-Marri his constitutional rights to challenge his accusers and reason for detention. The court ruled that al-Marri must be released from military detention to either be freed or to be placed in US civilian detention, when the federal government would have to charge him with crimes and provide a trial.

The court held an en banc rehearing of the ruling on October 31, 2007. In its decision issued on July 15, 2008, the Court voted 5-4 that if the Government's allegations are true, al-Marri can be held in military detention indefinitely as an enemy combatant. But, they determined that he has not received sufficient due process to determine if these allegations are in fact true. The case is allowed to return to trial court but no particular proceedings have been specified.

On November 9, 2008, Jerry Markon, writing in The Washington Post, reported that al-Marri's lawyers had petitioned the United States Supreme Court to overturn the lower court ruling that allowed him to be treated as an enemy combatant in spite of being a legal resident of the US. On December 5, 2008, the Supreme Court agreed to hear al-Marri's case.

On January 22, 2009, newly elected President Barack Obama issued a memorandum requiring that al-Marri's status be reviewed by his administration, in addition to those of detainees currently held at Guantanamo Bay detention camp.

== The New York Times editorials ==
The New York Times outlined the case of Ali al-Marri in an editorial on November 24, 2008, titled "Indefinite Detention". It criticized the George W. Bush administration's enemy combatant doctrine, and called on the Supreme Court justices to make clear that a president cannot trample on individual rights by imprisoning people indefinitely simply by asserting that they are tied to terrorism.

In an editorial of December 8, 2008, titled "Tortured Justice", the Times editorial board wrote:

The extent of the damage to American liberties, and how lasting it will be, will be told in part by the outcome of two cases [Ali al-Marri's "enemy combatant" and Maher Arar's "extraordinary rendition"] that are to be heard by the federal courts." They said the Obama administration would have to decide "whether to defend the indefensible when the case comes to trial."

== Court case ==
Following this review, the government transferred Al-Marri's case from military custody to the federal court system and went to trial. In a 2009 plea bargain, al Marri pleaded guilty to one count of conspiracy to support a terrorist group. He was sentenced to 8 years in prison.

The New Yorker, quoting inside sources, reported on February 26, 2009, that al-Marri was to be indicted by Obama's Department of Justice.

On February 27, 2009, Attorney General Eric Holder announced that a federal grand jury in the Central District of Illinois had returned a two-count indictment charging Ali Saleh Kahlah al-Marri, 43, with providing material support to al-Qaeda and conspiring with others to provide material support to al-Qaeda. He said that the Office of the Solicitor General would move to dismiss al-Marri's pending litigation before the U.S. Supreme Court, and that al-Marri would be transferred to Department of Justice custody for criminal prosecution as soon as the Supreme Court rules on that motion. On March 6, 2009, the U.S. Supreme Court dismissed the application, remanded to the Fourth Circuit, and instructed the Fourth Circuit to dismiss the appeal as moot. In March 2009, al-Marri made his first appearance before a judge in Charleston, South Carolina. After denying al-Marri's request for bail, the South Carolina judge ordered his transportation to Illinois. al-Marri pleaded not guilty before Judge Michael Mihm in a U.S. District Court of Illinois. Judge Mihm set the date of the trial for May 26. Mihm also ordered the prosecution to hand over evidence, such as a copy of al-Marri's hard drive, to the defense attorneys.

Al-Marri was transported afterward back to the Peoria federal court by the marshals and appeared before Mihm. He indicated to Mihm he understood the charges against him. In March 2009, al-Marri was returned to civilian custody in Peoria, from military custody.

== Guilty plea ==
On April 30, 2009, al-Marri entered a plea of guilty to one count of conspiracy to provide material support or resources to a foreign terrorist organization. He agreed in his plea that he attended terrorist training camps between 1998 and 2001, where he studied weapons and operational security. He met with Khalid Sheikh Mohammed and "offered his services" to aid al-Qaeda. Mohammed told him to travel to the United States by September 20, 2001, and wait for further instructions. al-Marri said that while enrolled at Bradley University, he researched cyanide on the Internet and continued communicating with al-Qaeda.

On October 29, 2009, al-Marri was sentenced to 8 years in prison, in consideration of the nearly eight years he had already been held. In March 2010, he was moved from Federal Correctional Institution, Pekin to the US Penitentiary, Florence Supermax security in Colorado. His release date was set as January 18, 2015.

On October 12, 2011, Tony Bartelme, writing in the Charleston Post and Courier reported on documents the paper had recently received from an 8-year-old Freedom of Information Act (FOIA) request about the use of the consolidated Navy brig in Charleston in the "war on terror". Among those documents was a 2005 exchange of memos between the prison's commander, E.P. Giambastiani, to Charles Stimson, Deputy Assistant Secretary of Defense for Detainee Affairs. In the memos, Giambastiani requested that al-Marri, Hamdy and Padilla be transferred to Guantanamo.

According to Bartelme:

Logbooks and other information obtained by al-Marri's Charleston attorney, Andy Savage, revealed that Defense Department and CIA agents interrogated al-Marri for months, at one point wrapping his head in duct tape and stuffing his mouth, a tactic Savage called dry-boarding.

This information was considered significant to the cases of the Guantanamo Bay homicide accusations, as there were reports in 2009 and 2010 that the three reported suicides in 2006 had been found with rags stuffed down their throats.

== Qatari reaction ==
In 2008, the United States requested bank records for al-Marri for use in their prosecution. The Qataris were reportedly angry that Washington had chosen to repatriate a different suspected terror financier to Sudan instead of al-Marri and denied the request.

== Release and repatriation ==
Al-Marri was repatriated to Qatar on January 18, 2015. Reports have surfaced that al-Marri was released as part of a proposed prisoner swap deal facilitated by Qatar. In July 2014, the then-US Ambassador to Qatar was approached by an individual acting on behalf of Qatar's attorney general, Ali Bin Mohsen Bin Fetais Al Marri, who is reportedly a relative of Ali Saleh al-Marri. They offered to facilitate the release of an American couple, Matthew and Grace Huang, who were imprisoned in Qatar over the death of their adopted daughter. The case was widely criticized as a show trial by human rights groups and legal experts. The U.S. Department of State denies that any such deal took place. The Huangs were later released from Qatar after their conviction was overturned.

Al-Marri's return to Qatar was widely celebrated. Prominent Qatari figures were invited to celebrate his return and high level figures, including a long time board member of Al Jazeera celebrated his return, members of the foreign and interior ministries and the editor in chief of Qatar's main newspaper al-Arab. He also received a congratulatory phone call from the country's prime minister upon his release.

His return was also praised by Specially Designated Global Terrorist, Abdulrahman al Nuaymi, who is currently living with legal impunity in Qatar.

The U.S. has received some criticism for releasing him back to Qatar instead of Saudi Arabia, the country whose passport he originally used to travel to the United States. Furthermore, Qatar has a borderline permissive attitude towards terrorism finance that led to concerns that al-Marri would again be involved in plotting violence against the United States.

== Torture claim ==
In its reporting, Al Jazeera quoted one of al-Marri's lawyer's assertions that he was subjected to the brutal and dangerous torture technique known as "dry-boarding".

== See also ==
- Al-Marri v. Wright (2008)
- Jarallah al-Marri, his brother, former detainee at Guantanamo Bay Naval Base in Cuba.
- Yaser Esam Hamdi, former U.S. citizen who was held as an enemy combatant in the Continental U.S. See Supreme Court ruling Hamdi v. Rumsfeld (2004)
