= Murat Kurnaz =

Turkish resident of Germany tortured during US detention

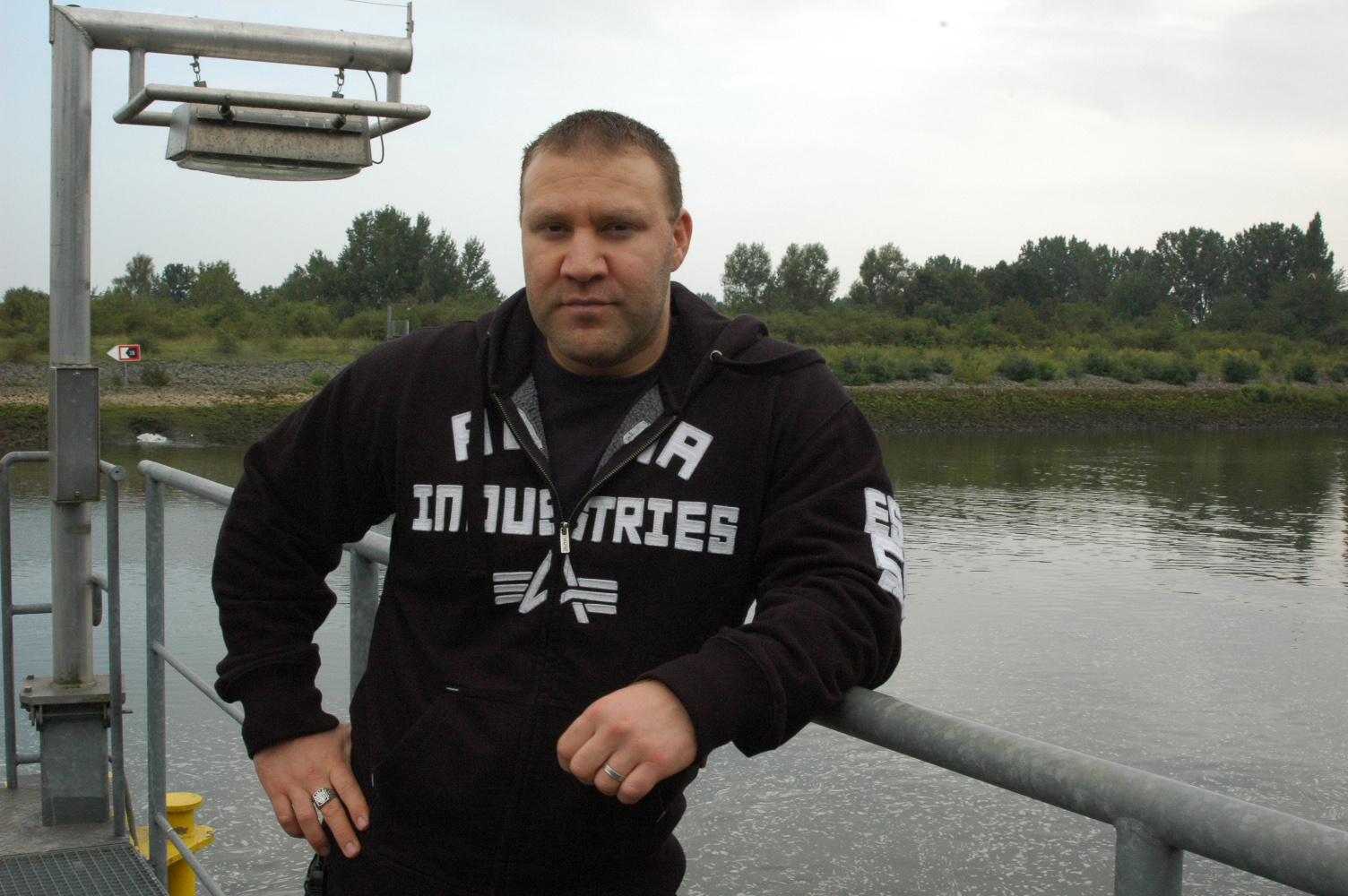
- Kurnaz in 2011
- Born: 19 March 1982 (age 44); Bremen, West Germany
- Detained at: Kandahar Internment Facility, Guantanamo
- ISN: 61
- Status: Transferred to Germany

Murat Kurnaz (born 19 March 1982) is a Turkish citizen and legal resident of Germany who was held in extrajudicial detention by the United States at its military base in Kandahar, Afghanistan and in the Guantanamo Bay detention camp at Guantanamo Bay Naval Base, Cuba beginning in December 2001. He was tortured in both places. By early 2002, intelligence officials of the United States and Germany had concluded that accusations against Kurnaz were groundless.

According to the BBC, Germany refused to accept him at that time, although the US offered to release him. Kurnaz was detained and abused at Guantanamo for nearly five more years. He published a memoir of his experience, Five Years of My Life: An Innocent Man in Guantanamo in German in 2007; translations to other European languages and English followed. In 2008 he testified in US Congressional hearings about treatment of detainees at the camp. He and his family live in Germany.

== Arrest in Pakistan ==
Murat Kurnaz was born in Bremen, Germany, and grew up there. He was considered a Turkish citizen because his parents were immigrants, but they had lived and worked in Germany for years. He was a legal German resident and married a Turkish woman in Germany. In October 2001 Kurnaz at age 19 traveled from Germany to Pakistan, hoping to study at the Mansura Center (which turned him down); he spent the next two months as a tablighi, a Muslim pilgrim sojourning from mosque to mosque. In December 2001, while Kurnaz was on a bus to the airport to return to Germany, Pakistani police at a checkpoint detained him. After questioning him for a few days, they turned him over to American soldiers. Later, Kurnaz learned that after its invasion of Afghanistan following the 9/11 attacks, the United States had distributed fliers there and in Pakistan promising "enough money to take care of your family, your village, your tribe for the rest of your life" as a bounty for suspected terrorists. Kurnaz says "a great number of men wound up in Guantánamo as a result." One of Kurnaz's interrogators at Guantanamo confirmed that he had been "sold" for a $3,000 bounty.

== Torture at Kandahar, Afghanistan ==
After finally being released, Kurnaz wrote a memoir of his years at Guantanamo, which was published in German in 2007 and in English the following year. The following sections contain mostly material from his account. He said that he was chained to the floor of an aircraft with other prisoners and kicked and beaten by US soldiers during a flight from Pakistan to Kandahar. Upon his arrival, although his head was covered with a sack, he could make out soldiers filming and photographing them. Later the US released such photos to the media as "evidence" of his capture in the Afghanistan war zone, although Kurnaz and all the prisoners had just been flown in from Pakistan.

US soldiers stripped Kurnaz naked, and threw him into an outdoor barbed wire pen with about twenty other prisoners. The prisoners were left exposed to freezing cold, rain and snow. The soldiers threw over the fence some MREs ("Meals Ready to Eat") that had been opened and stripped of most of their contents. Kurnaz estimated they received less than 600 calories per day; human beings need more than 1,500 calories to survive.

During interrogations, US soldiers would ask him a question such as "where is Osama?" and punch him in the face when he said he didn't know. "Hour upon hour, they repeated the same questions accompanied by punches and kicks," Kurnaz recalled in his memoirs. The interrogators refused to believe his protestations of innocence. He saw seven soldiers using rifle butts to beat another prisoner to death. The abuse of Kurnaz escalated to include electric shock prods applied to the soles of his feet, until the pain caused him to pass out. His head was repeatedly pushed into a bucket of water until he blacked out from lack of oxygen.

He was taken to a building where he was attached to a pulley from the ceiling, suspended by handcuffs on his wrists and hoisted off his feet, left there to dangle hour after hour. Each time he was let down, a uniformed officer with a patch on his chest that said "doctor" examined him and took his pulse, said "okay," and the soldiers hoisted him back up again. They also hung him up backwards, with his hands bound behind his back. Kurnaz is not sure how long he was suspended by his arms, but other prisoners informed him it was five days. Later he learned that this hanging treatment had killed prisoners at the Bagram base; he believes a prisoner in the room next to his died from being hung up by his arms.

Soldiers with uniforms showing the German flag, who identified themselves as German KSK, special forces, came to interrogate him. Kurnaz hoped they would have to make a report, which would let German authorities and eventually his family know that he was being held at Kandahar.

== Torture in Guantanamo, Cuba ==
Early one morning Kurnaz was given new orange overalls, and his head was bound in a gas mask, his ears covered with soundproof headphones, and his eyes with thick black diving goggles. His hands were put in mittens. Blindfolded and so tightly handcuffed that circulation was cut off, he was punched in the face, kicked in the genitals, and left on the ground. Some hours later Kurnaz and others were chained together and herded onto a plane. During the long flight, the prisoners were not allowed to sleep: "the soldiers kept hitting us to keep us awake." The feel of bright sun and extreme heat indicated to him that he had arrived in a different country.

On the bus ride from the plane to the prison cages, soldiers continued to beat the prisoners and allowed dogs to bite them. Kurnaz was taken to a tent, where his fingerprints and DNA swabs were taken, and afterward he was put in a cage made of chain link fence. Such small metal cages were to be his home for the next five years, most spent in a cage with three and a half by three and a half feet of free space.

Kurnaz learned that the difference between Kandahar and Guantanamo was a system deliberately designed to inflict "maximum pressure around the clock," to humiliate and brutalize, but to keep prisoners alive to extract information. According to his account, six prisoners were killed: three suffocated on one night and three more were apparently poisoned with drugged food. (US authorities later claimed all six were suicides.)

At Guantanamo, Kurnaz was beaten and sprayed with pepper spray and tear gas repeatedly for such supposed infractions as lying down or standing at the wrong time, touching a fence, talking or staying silent, looking at a guard or failing to look at a guard. He was also beaten during interrogations. A series of interrogators always asked the same questions, did not appear to believe his answers, and when he passed out from exhaustion, they hit him in the face and head as "they couldn't think of any better way to keep me awake." Beatings and leaving him shackled in contorted positions for days were the most common forms of abuse.

During "Operation Sandman", soldiers woke Kurnaz every one or two hours to change cages, forced him to stand or kneel 24 hours a day, and deprived him of sleep for three weeks. Toward the end, he was semi-conscious and not able to walk, and they had to drag him from cage to cage. Kurnaz was also put in solitary confinement in a windowless refrigerator and subjected to hypothermia. He was caged in a container in the Cuban sun baking in extreme heat, and in a small airtight box so that over hours and days he suffocated slowly. He was starved or force-fed; subjected to sexual humiliation; and beaten constantly.

Detainees were terrorized by the treatment of fellow detainees. A military doctor amputated both legs of a Saudi detainee named Abdul Rahman because of frostbite. Kurnaz watched from the neighboring cage as soldiers beat the legless man's fingers off the chain link fence when he tried to pull himself up to sit on his toilet-bucket. Dragged out for interrogations with his stumps dangling, he would return with his face bloodied from beatings. Another had frostbite on one finger and a military surgeon amputated all his fingers, leaving only his thumbs. A third complained of a toothache and the dentist pulled his healthy teeth. Wounds and fractured limbs, including fingers broken during interrogations, were left untreated. Kurnaz's health suffered over the years but he "tried to avoid being taken to the doctor at all costs. I wanted to keep my teeth, fingers, and legs."

American and German intelligence agencies had concluded that Kurnaz was innocent of any involvement in terrorism by early 2002. He was held at Guantanamo under these conditions and brutalized for five more years, until 2007.

== Military tribunal declares him enemy combatant ==
After two and a half years at Guantánamo, in 2004, Kurnaz was brought before a military tribunal. The Combatant Status Review Tribunals began after the US Supreme Court decision in Rasul v. Bush that detainees had a right to due process and habeas corpus to challenge the grounds of their detention. A Summary of Evidence memo was prepared for each detainee listing the allegations that supported detention as an "enemy combatant". Tribunal rules forbade Kurnaz from seeing or challenging his file.

The evidence against Kurnaz included his association with an alleged suicide bomber named Selcuk, who in Pakistan had traveled to the airport on the same bus with Kurnaz. In fact Selcuk had never been arrested nor involved in any bombing; he is married and lives in Germany with his family. The other evidence was that Kurnaz had accepted food and hospitality from mosques in Pakistan, and some mosques may have been associated with a suspect Islamic missionary group called Jama'at al Tablighi. Based on this evidence the tribunal ruled Kurnaz a dangerous "enemy combatant," a member of Al Q'aeda.

== Representation by American lawyer ==
In October 2004, after two years of abuse and weeks after the tribunal had classified him as an "enemy combatant", a civilian American lawyer, Professor Baher Azmy from the Center for Constitutional Rights (CCR), succeeded in getting an interview with Kurnaz. Professor Azmy brought a handwritten letter from Kurnaz's mother, proof that his family knew of his situation and was working for his release. His mother's German lawyer had heard that the US Center for Constitutional Rights represented Guantánamo detainees; they contacted the CCR, who assigned Azmy to the case. Azmy also showed Kurnaz newspaper and magazine clippings about his case. Kurnaz was one of the first three Guantanamo prisoners allowed to see an attorney.

Kurnaz shared with other prisoners the news he had learned from Azmy: a US war in Iraq; a new government in Afghanistan; and a US judge had ruled the Guantanamo military tribunals to be unconstitutional. As a punishment for speaking to the lawyer and telling others what he had learned, guards shut up Kurnaz for a month in the asphyxiating oven called Block India, "the harshest punishment there was." They accused him of "talking to the others about Jihad." But it was worth it, Kurnaz said, because "We were connected to the world again! We knew what was happening outside Guantanamo!"

=== Habeas corpus challenge ===
Kurnaz's lawyer challenged the legality of his detention in a Washington, D.C. federal court. A writ of habeas corpus, Murat Kurnaz v. George W. Bush, was submitted on his behalf in October 2004. His case was one of nearly 60 reviewed and coordinated by Judge Joyce Hens Green of the US Appeals Court for the District of Columbia.

In response, on 15 October 2004, the Department of Defense published 32 pages of unclassified documents related to his Combatant Status Review Tribunal. In 2005, Kurnaz's entire file was declassified, through a bureaucratic slip-up. During the brief window when it was declassified, in March 2005 the Washington Post reviewed all the evidence against him and published a summary.

The file documented that neither German nor United States Army investigators found any evidence of a tie between Kurnaz and Al-Qaeda, or involvement in any terrorist activities, and had concluded in 2002 that he should be released. But, US authorities continued to hold Kurnaz at Guantanamo, subject to continued abuse and interrogation, until the late summer of 2006.

== Rioting and deaths of inmates ==
Kurnaz witnessed resistance by inmates, through violence or hunger strikes. He said later these incidents were usually triggered not by routine abuse, but rather by US soldiers desecrating the Quran.

Inmates emptied their toilet buckets over soldiers who had thrown the Quran on the dirt floor. After the arrival of General Geoffrey Miller in late 2002 (the abuse by the military was reported as considerably worsened during his command), the inmates coordinated a welcome, emptying their buckets of excrement on him as he walked past their cages. Thereafter inmates called him "Mr. Toilet." For dumping excrement on General Miller, Kurnaz reported prisoners received an extra month of solitary confinement. Later the cellblock was subject to reduced rations, which were halved for about forty days.

Kurnaz accuses US forces of poisoning three rebellious prisoners. "One evening, out of the blue, the guards had brought us baklava", saying it was to celebrate the release of some prisoners. One of Kurnaz's neighbors fell asleep in his cage, and lay unmoving with a white froth around his mouth. Kurnaz learned two others were removed from their cages dead in a similar state. US authorities said the three prisoners simultaneously committed suicide by taking pills. Kurnaz said in his memoir that this was a lie, since "[n]o one had any pills, and we were searched, orally as well, three times a day."

After another incident of desecration of the Quran, Kurnaz said that Afghan prisoners tore down a ceiling fan, honed blades, and attacked their captors using the fan blades as swords. No soldiers were killed, though some were badly bloodied. Three more prisoners subsequently died. Kurnaz said that people from the cellblock of these prisoners talked to him about events. They described the metal shutters being closed. They said that night, soldiers carried three of the prisoners out of their cells dead, with pieces of torn sheet in their mouths and other torn sheets binding their arms and legs. US authorities said these three prisoners had committed suicide.

Although the US reported numerous suicide attempts, the only deaths reported by the US military at Guantanamo during the period when Kurnaz was detained were three suicides on 20 June 2006. The prisoners were two Saudi Arabians Mani al-Utaybi and Yasser al-Zahrani, and a Yemeni citizen, Ali Abdullah Ahmed. A State Department spokesman said the prisoners were apparently not aware that one was to be transferred to Saudi Arabia, although to be held in custody there, and another was to be released to Saudi Arabia. Human rights groups and defense lawyers called for investigation.

The Naval Criminal Investigative Service conducted an investigation, releasing a heavily redacted report in 2008. In 2009 the law school at Seton Hall University released a study, alleging that DOD claimed the suicides in a coverup of homicides due to torture. In a joint investigation, reported in January 2010, Harper's Magazine and NBC News also alleged that the military had committed homicides in the course of torturing detainees and tried to cover up these three deaths.

== Release in 2006 ==
Kurnaz believes that he was finally released because of German government diplomatic pressure, including German Chancellor Angela Merkel's face-to-face appeal to American President Bush.

On 12 February 2006, Deutsche Welle reported that German authorities were negotiating Kurnaz's repatriation. The German magazine Focus reported in 2006 that the Bush administration was trying to tie the release of Kurnaz to Germany's agreeing to accept four other Guantanamo detainees. The USA had cleared approximately 120 detainees for release or transfer but many could not be returned to their countries of origin. The German and American governments denied that Kurnaz's release had been tied to Germany accepting other detainees. Focus reported that the German government had agreed to accept one other detainee, not four. It said that the US had not informed the German government of the identities of the other detainees it wanted them to accept.

Kurnaz was released on 24 August 2006. As during his arrival at Guantanamo, he was transported to his destination by plane, restrained in shackles and wearing a muzzle, opaque goggles, and sound-blocking ear-muffs, and denied food and water during the 17-hour flight.

== Life in Germany after release ==
After his release, Kurnaz wrote and published his memoir Five Years of My Life: An Innocent Man in Guantanamo (2007). It was published in German, French, Norwegian, Danish, and Dutch in 2007. Excerpts were published serially by The Guardian beginning 23 April 2008, the same month that Palgrave Macmillan published an English translation of the book in the United States. A Polish translation was published in 2009. British author John le Carré described it in a blurb as "[t]he most compassionate, truthful, and dignified account of the disgrace of Guantanamo that you are ever likely to read."

Kurnaz cooperated in the German government's 2007 investigation of German soldiers who had interrogated him in Kandahar. According to articles by the United Press International, Deutsche Welle and Reuters, Kurnaz identified his interrogators from photos he was shown of members of the German military's KSK unit. The German Ministry of Defense initially had denied that KSK members were in Afghanistan at that time. By May 2007, they acknowledged that the KSK had officers in Kandahar and had contact with Kurnaz. Although the investigation was dropped in 2007, the government conceded abuse may have occurred.

In 2007, a German Parliamentary inquiry undertook investigation of the extent to which German military and counter-terrorism authorities participated in the United States extraordinary rendition program.

Kurnaz testified via videolink in 2008 to a United States Congressional hearing on Guantanamo. On 15 June 2008, the McClatchy News Service published a series of articles based on interviews with 66 former Guantanamo captives, including Kurnaz. In the interview Kurnaz said that since his return to Germany, he has lived with his parents. He has a desk job, which he enjoys. He says he does not hold ordinary Americans responsible for the abuse he endured.

== Memoir editions ==
- (German) Murat Kurnaz: Fünf Jahre meines Lebens. Ein Bericht aus Guantánamo (Five Years of My Life: A Report from Guantánamo). Rowohlt, Berlin, April 2007. ISBN 978-3-87134-589-0
- (French) Murat Kurnaz: Dans l'enfer de Guantanamo. (In the Hell of Guantanamo) Paris: Fayard, 2007. 306p. ISBN 978-2-213-63425-8
- (Norwegian) Murat Kurnaz: Fem år av mitt liv : en beretning fra Guantanamo. Oslo, Norway, 2007. ISBN 978-82-92622-33-9
- (Danish) Fem år af mit liv: En beretning fra Guantánamo af Murat Kurnaz. Klim, 2007. ISBN 978-87-7955-582-2
- (English) Five Years of My Life: An Innocent Man in Guantanamo Palgrave Macmillan, April 2008. ISBN 978-0-230-60374-5
- (Dutch) Murat Kurnaz: In de hel van Guantánamo, Forum, 270p. ISBN 978-90-492-0002-2
- (Polish) Murat Kurnaz: Guantanamo: pięć lat z mojego życia. Wydawnictwo W.A.B., 2008. ISBN 978-83-7414-493-3

== See also ==
- Lakhdar Boumediene, Bosnian citizen mistakenly imprisoned seven years in Guantanamo
- Khaled El-Masri, German and Lebanese citizen mistakenly held and tortured in Afghanistan
- Boumediene v. Bush (2008)
- Guantanamo Bay homicide accusations
- Enhanced interrogation techniques
- Geoffrey D. Miller, Guantanamo commanding general 2002–2004.
