= Shaker Aamer =

Saudi citizen held in Guantanamo Bay from 2001–2015

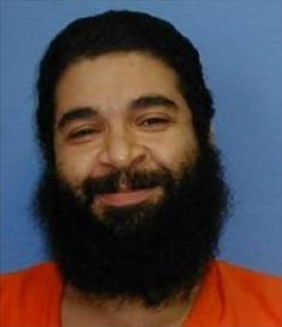
- Aamer in Guantanamo (photo taken before 1 November 2007)
- Born: 21 December 1966 (age 59); Medina, Saudi Arabia
- Arrested: December 2001; Jalalabad, Afghanistan; Northern Alliance
- Released: 2015
- Detained at: Guantanamo Bay detainment camp
- ISN: 239
- Spouse: Zin Siddique
- Children: 4

Shaker Abd al-Rahim Muhammad Aamer (Arabic: شاكر عبد الرحيم محمد عامر; born 21 December 1966) is a Saudi citizen who was held by the United States in the Guantanamo Bay detention camp in Cuba for more than thirteen years without charge.

Aamer was seized in Afghanistan by bounty hunters, who handed him over to US forces in December 2001 during the United States military operation in the country. Two months later, the US rendered Aamer to the Guantánamo camp, where he was held without trial or charge. Aamer had been a legal resident in Britain for years before his imprisonment; the UK government repeatedly demanded his release, and many people there called for him to be released.

According to documents published in the Guantanamo Bay files leak, the US military Joint Task Force Guantanamo believed that Aamer had led a unit of fighters in Afghanistan, including at the Battle of Tora Bora, while his family was paid a stipend by Osama bin Laden. The file asserts past associations with Richard Reid and Zacarias Moussaoui. Aamer denies involvement in terrorist activity and his lawyer, Clive Stafford Smith, said the leaked documents would not stand up in court. He claimed that part of the evidence came from an unreliable witness and that confessions Aamer made had been obtained through torture. Aamer's father-in-law, Saaed Ahmed Siddique, said: "All of these claims have no basis. If any of this was true he would be in a court now." The Bush administration acknowledged later that it had no evidence against Aamer.

Aamer has never been charged with any wrongdoing, was never on trial, and his lawyer says he is "totally innocent." He was approved for transfer to Saudi Arabia by the Bush administration in 2007 and the Obama administration in 2009. He has been described as a "charismatic leader" who spoke up and fought for the rights of fellow prisoners. Aamer alleges that he has been subject to torture in detention.

Aamer has suffered decline in his mental and physical health over the years, as he participated in hunger strikes to protest his detention conditions, and was held in solitary confinement for much of the time. He claims to have lost 40 per cent of his body weight in captivity. After a visit in November 2011, his lawyer said, "I do not think it is stretching matters to say that he is gradually dying in Guantanamo Bay." In 2015, despite Aamer's deteriorating health, the US denied a request for an independent medical examination.

Aamer, the last British resident to be held at Guantanamo Bay, was released to the United Kingdom on 30 October 2015.

== Family and personal life ==
Aamer was born on 21 December 1966 and grew up in Medina in Saudi Arabia. He left the country at the age of 17. He lived and traveled in the United States, Europe and the Middle East. Aamer lived and studied in Georgia and Maryland in 1989 and 1990. During the Gulf War, he worked as a translator for the United States Army.

He moved to the United Kingdom in 1996 where he met Zin Siddique, a British woman; they married in 1997 and he established legal residency in Britain. They have four British children, the youngest of whom Aamer had never met, due to his having been born after Aamer's imprisonment. Aamer had indefinite leave to remain in the UK, and was applying for British citizenship.

Aamer worked as an Arabic translator for London law firms. Some of the solicitors he worked for dealt with immigration cases. In his spare time, Aamer helped refugees find accommodation and offered them advice on their struggles with the Home Office.

In 2012, Aamer's family lived in Battersea, South London. His wife Zin Aamer suffered from depression and mental episodes after his arrest. Saeed Siddique, Aamer's father-in-law, said in 2011, "When he was captured, Shaker offered to let my daughter divorce him, but she said, 'No, I will wait for you.' She is still waiting."

== Arrest and allegations ==
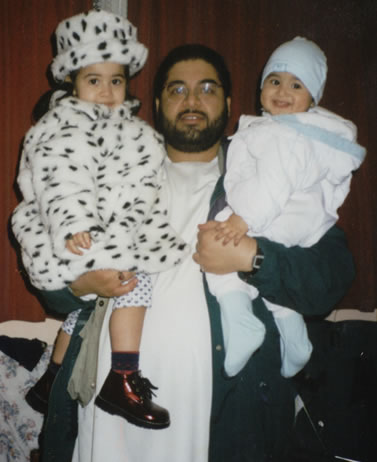
Aamer with daughter, Johnina (left), and son Mikaeel (photo taken before his capture in 2001, released by his lawyer)

Aamer took his family to Afghanistan in 2001, where he was working for an Islamic charity when the US invaded the country later that year. The Northern Alliance took him into custody in Jalalabad in December 2001, and passed him to the Americans. The US routinely paid ransom for Arabs handed over to them. They interrogated Aamer at Bagram Theater Internment Facility and transported him to Guantanamo on 14 February 2002.

According to Joint Task Force Guantanamo assessments from 1 November 2007, the US military believed that Aamer was a "recruiter, financier, and facilitator" for al-Qaeda, based partly on evidence given by the informant Yasim Muhammed Basardah, a fellow detainee. The leaked documents alleged that Aamer had confessed to interrogators that he was in Tora Bora with Osama bin Laden at the time of the US bombing. The documents further note that the Saudi intelligence Mabahith identified Aamer "as a high priority for the government of Saudi Arabia, an indication of his law enforcement value to them."

In 2010, the Guantanamo Review Task Force released their report of the detainee assessments. In many instances, the Task Force largely agreed with prior threat assessments of the detainees and sometimes found additional information that further substantiated such assessments. In other instances, the Task Force found prior assessments to be overstated. Some assessments, for example, contained allegations that were not supported by the underlying source document upon which they relied. Other assessments contained conclusions that were stated categorically even though derived from uncorroborated statements or raw intelligence reporting of undetermined or questionable reliability. Conversely, in a few cases, the Task Force discovered reliable information indicating that a detainee posed a greater threat in some respects than prior assessments suggested.

Aamer denies being involved in terrorist activity and his attorney, Clive Stafford Smith of Reprieve, said the evidence against his client "would not stand up in court." He pointed out that part of the evidence comes from Yasim Muhammed Basardah, whom American judges found to be "utterly incredible" and who was tortured and "promised all sorts of things."

The Bush administration acknowledged later that it had no evidence against Aamer, and he was cleared for transfer in 2007. The clearance was for transfer to Saudi Arabia only.

== Aamer's allegations of being tortured in Bagram ==
In September 2009, Zachary Katznelson, a Reprieve lawyer, said that Aamer had told of suffering severe beatings at the Bagram facility. Aamer said that close to a dozen men had beaten him, including interrogators who represented themselves as officers of MI5, the United Kingdom's internal counter-terrorism agency. Following one severe beating, he recovered from being stunned to find that all the interrogators had left the room and put a pistol on the table. He did not determine if the pistol was loaded. He said it occurred to him that it had been left either so he could kill himself, or that, if he picked it up, he could be shot and killed on the excuse he was trying to shoot them.

Aamer says that the "MI5" interrogators told him he had two choices: (1) agree to spy on suspected jihadists in the United Kingdom; or (2) remain in US custody. He said that guards/agents repeatedly knocked his head against the wall while an MI5 officer was in the room.

All I know is that I felt someone grab my head and start beating my head into the back wall – so hard that my head was bouncing. And they were shouting that they would kill me or I would die.

Other former detainees have alleged similar mistreatment by MI5 and MI6 agents, including torture. Seven detainees filed suit against the British government over their mistreatment and torture. In November 2010, the British government settled the suit, paying the detainees millions of pounds in compensation. Aamer is also on the compensation list and part of the deal, but details are not known as most of the deal is still secret.

== Guantanamo ==
Aamer has been described as an unofficial spokesman for the detainees at Guantanamo. He has spoken up for the welfare of prisoners, negotiating with camp commanders and organizing protests against cruel treatment. He organized and participated in a hunger strike in 2005 in which he lost half of his weight. He demanded the prisoners be treated according to the Geneva Convention, allowing the detainees to form a grievance committee. In negotiations, the camp administration promised a healthier diet for the prisoners after he agreed to end the hunger strike. His lawyer Stafford Smith said the grievance committee was formed, but that the camp authorities disbanded it after a few days. American spokesman Major Jeffrey Weir denied that the Americans had ever agreed to any conditions resulting from the hunger strike.

In September 2006, Aamer's attorneys filed a 16-page motion arguing for his removal from isolation in Guantanamo Bay prison. They argued extended periods of isolation were detrimental to his mental and physical health.

Aamer continued to take part in additional hunger strikes and was held in solitary confinement for most of the time. His lawyers described his solitary confinement as "cruel" and said his health was affected to a point where they feared for his life. In 2011 Stafford Smith, director of the UK branch of Reprieve, said Aamer is "falling apart at the seams."

Given the time involved, the lengthy spells in solitary confinement and the torture allegedly used against him, Shaker Aamer's plight has been one of the worst of all the detainees held at Guantanamo.

— Amnesty International

On 18 September 2006, Aamer's attorneys filed a 16-page motion arguing for his removal from isolation in Guantanamo Bay prison. The motion alleges that Aamer had been held in solitary confinement for 360 days at the time of filing, and was tortured by beatings, exposure to temperature extremes, and sleep deprivation, which together caused him to suffer to the point of becoming mentally unbalanced. The next day Katznelson filed a motion to enforce the Geneva Conventions on his behalf.

After President Barack Obama was elected, in 2009 he convened a six-agency task force to review the status of detainees at Guantanamo. It "unanimously recommended" transfer of Aamer. Security officials wanted to send him to Saudi Arabia, his country of citizenship, but his attorneys argued for him to be transferred to Great Britain, where he had been resident and had family.

In September 2011, Aamer's lawyer Brent Mickum, who saw him in Guantánamo, alleged that Aamer was repeatedly beaten before their meetings. He said that Aamer's mental and physical health was deteriorating. "It felt like he has given up: that's what 10 years, mostly in solitary confinement will do to a person," he said.

Binyam Mohamed, an Ethiopian prisoner who formerly occupied a cell one door down from Aamer, has said since his release that he knew why Aamer was still in the prison camps.

I would say the Americans are trying to keep him as silent as they could. It's not that he has anything. What happened in 2005 and 2006 is something that the Americans don't want the world to know – hunger strikes, and all the events that took place, until the three brothers who died ... insider information of all the events, probably. Obviously, Shaker doesn't have it, but the Americans think he may have some of it, and they don't like this kind of information being released.

Clive Stafford Smith, his lawyer and director of human rights organisation Reprieve, came to a similar conclusion. He said:

I have known Shaker for some time, because he is so eloquent and outspoken about the injustices of Guantanamo he is very definitely viewed as a threat by the US. Not in the sense of being an extremist but in the sense of being someone who can rather eloquently criticise the nightmare that happened there.

Omar Deghayes, a former Guantanamo Detainee who knew Aamer, said of him,

He was always forward, he would translate for people, he'd fight for them, and if he had any problems in the block he'd shout at the guards... until he would get you your rights. And that's why he's still in prison... because he's very outspoken, a very intelligent person, somebody who would fight for somebody else's rights.

=== At Camp "No" in June 2006 ===
In an article published in 2010, Aamer said that he was beaten for hours and subjected to interrogation methods that included asphyxiation on 9 June 2006, the same day that three fellow prisoners died in Guantanamo. The United States claimed these deaths were suicides.

Describing his treatment, Aamer said that he was strapped to a chair, fully restrained at the head, arms and legs, while MAs pressed on pressure points all over his body: his temples, just under his jawline, in the hollow beneath his ears. They bent his nose repeatedly, pinched his thighs and feet. They inflicted pain to his eyes, bent his fingers until he screamed and then they cut off his airway and put a mask over him, so he could not cry out.

Please torture me in the old way ... Here they destroy people mentally and physically without leaving marks.

— Aamer in a letter to The Independent

The law professor Scott Horton published an award-winning article on the 2006 deaths in Harper's Magazine in 2010, suggesting that these were cases of homicide caused by extended torture, rather than suicide. He said that Aamer had been brought to "Camp No," a secret interrogation black site outside the camp, with the three men who died on the day of the event. Horton described Aamer's account of having his airways cut off as "alarming" and wrote, "This is the same technique that appears to have been used on the three deceased prisoners." Colonel Michael Bumgarner, the commander of the camps during the incident and identified in Horton's article as having been present during the interrogations, denied Horton's claims.

Horton wrote that Aamer's repatriation was being delayed so that he could not testify about his alleged torture in Bagram or the events of 9 June 2006. He wrote: "American authorities may be concerned that Aamer, if released, could provide evidence against them in criminal investigations."

=== 2013 hunger strike and detention condition ===
In 2013, Aamer told his attorneys that he was among the growing group of active hunger strikers. He said he had been refusing meals since 15 February and had lost 32 pounds. In previous hunger strikes, guards force-fed him with tubes down his nose. His lawyer said Aamer spent 22 hours a day alone in his cell. Aamer was not permitted visitors except his attorneys. Aamer was among a group of detainees who filed a court challenge to the authorities' practice of force feeding those on hunger strikes. A United States appellate court ruled in 2014 "that the judiciary could oversee conditions of confinement at the prison."

=== 2014 motion for release ===
In 2014, his lawyers filed a motion on Aamer's behalf seeking his release on the grounds that his health is "gravely diminished". They argued that his various health problems could not be treated in Guantanamo and "even if he receives the intensive medical and therapeutic treatment his condition requires, Mr Aamer will take many years, if not a lifetime, to achieve any significant recovery". His lawyers argued that both the Geneva Convention and Army Regulation 190-8, require the repatriation of chronically ill prisoners. In 2015 despite Aamer's deteriorating health, the US denied attorneys' request for an independent medical examination.

== UK release negotiations ==
The United Kingdom government initially refused to intervene on the behalf of Guantánamo detainees who were legal British residents but were not British citizens. In August 2007, Foreign Secretary David Miliband requested the release of Aamer and four other men, based on their having been granted refugee status, or similar leave, to remain in Britain as residents prior to their capture by US forces. With the repatriation of Binyam Mohammed in February 2009, all British citizens and residents other than Aamer had been released.

The UK government officials repeatedly raised Aamer's case with the Americans. On a visit to the United States on 13 March 2009, when asked about Guantánamo captives, Home Secretary Jacqui Smith said that the US administration has said they do not want to return Aamer to the UK. William Hague, the Foreign Secretary, raised Aamer's case again with Hillary Clinton, US Secretary of State, in November 2010, followed by meetings with other US officials. At the time, the US government had reached settlement with former detainees as a resolution for damages due to the use of torture in interrogation.

In September 2011, Foreign Office Minister Alistair Burt said that negotiations were ongoing and confidential. Supporters of Aamer criticized the UK government for not doing enough on his behalf; they urged the government to step up their efforts. In January 2012, The Independent revealed that the British government has spent £274,345 fighting in court including preventing Aamer's lawyers gaining access to evidence which might have proved his innocence. The newspaper reported that Aamer had several serious medical complaints from years of "inhumane" detention conditions, and that the UK gave false hope to his family.

== Calls for his release ==
- In January 2010, his 12-year-old daughter Johina wrote a letter to Gordon Brown asking for her father's release.
- August 2010, protesters disrupted a meeting that discussed plans to create a US Embassy near Battersea, the home of Aamer and his family.
- On 11 December 2010, hundreds took to the streets in London near the US embassy to demand Aamer's release.
- In February 2011, Amnesty International called Aamer's incarceration a "mockery of justice" and denounced the "cruel limbo" he was held in. At the same time The Guardian reported that people had sent 12000 emails to US Secretary of State Hillary Clinton and UK MPs in support of Aamer.
- In May 2011, students of University of St Andrews protested for the release of Aamer.
- In early 2012, as Aamer neared ten years' imprisonment in Guantánamo, campaigners stepped up efforts for his release. Among them, Jane Ellison, Tory MP for Battersea, wrote to President Barack Obama to urge Aamer's release.
- February 2012, marking the 10th anniversary of Aamer's detention, a series of protests took place in England while detainees conducted a hunger strike in Guantanamo.
- In December 2012, the comedian Frankie Boyle donated £50,000 to Aamer's legal fund for suits against MI6.
- By April 2013, 117,384 British citizens or UK residents had signed an online petition to pressure the UK Government for Aamer's release.
- In July 2013, Clive Stafford-Smith, director of the UK branch of Reprieve; Frankie Boyle, Scottish comedian; and actress Julie Christie went on a sequential hunger strike in support of Shaker Aamer and his release.
- In March 2015 British lawmaker John McDonnell said, "The case of Shaker Aamer is one of the worst cases of a miscarriage of justice in the last three decades at least ... He has endured harsh, and brutal and inhuman treatment," in a debate in which members of all major political parties called for Aamer's release.
- On 4 July 2015 (US Independence Day), 80 prominent Britons including six former cabinet ministers, leading writers, actors, directors, and musicians urged Obama to free Aamer.

== Release ==
On 30 October 2015, Aamer was flown from Cuba, stepping on British soil at 13.00 GMT. In a later interview he discussed his detention and family life. He also called upon extremists to "get the hell out" of Britain, stating that civilian killings were "not allowed" in Islam, and went on to say that "you cannot just go in the street and get a knife and start stabbing people", in apparent reference to the murder of Lee Rigby.

== Representation in other media ==
- In her album In The Current Climate (2011), singer-songwriter Sarah Gillespie had an imaginary first-person song of Aamer, entitled "How The West was Won". Gillespie dedicated the track to Aamer in the CD booklet.
- In August 2013 the singer PJ Harvey released the song "Shaker Aamer," describing Aamer's plight being force-fed during a month-long hunger strike.

== See also ==
- Poems From Guantánamo mentions "They Fight for Peace" written by Shaker Aamer
