= Dry-boarding =

Inducing asphyxia as a means of torture

Dry-boarding is a torture method that induces the first stages of death by asphyxiation. Unlike waterboarding, where water is poured on a wet cloth placed over a supine subject's airways, so their breathing slowly fills their lungs with water, dryboarding induces asphyxiation through stuffing the subject's airways with rags, then taping shut their mouth and nose. It is among techniques used by the United States during its war on terror: CIA and military agents under the Bush administration described this as among enhanced interrogation techniques. It has since legally been defined by US courts as torture.

Ali Saleh al-Marri, a legal resident of the United States, was arrested while in graduate school. After being classified by the Department of Defense as an enemy combatant, he was held in a Navy brig in the USA. He described to his lawyer that, during his early interrogation, agents stuffed rags down his throat and then taped his mouth and nose shut. His attorney described this procedure as dry-boarding. This material was reported by the press after being received following an eight-year-old FOIA request.

When this information was published in 2011, Almerindo Ojeda, the director of the Center for the Study of Human Rights in the Americas, made the connection to the deaths of three detainees on June 10, 2006, at the Guantanamo Bay detention camp. At the time, DOD had said each of the men committed suicide, all on the same night. The NCIS investigative report (2008) described the men as having rags stuffed down their throats. Ojeda and the journalists Tony Bartelme and Scott Horton said this sounded like dry-boarding. Ojeda expressed skepticism by underlining his doubt that the men could have committed suicide by stuffing rags down their own throats, then tying their hands behind their backs, and suspending themselves by their necks, as described in the NCIS report of 2008 and DOD accounts. He wrote: "It is clear that dryboarding can dispose, single-handedly, of all the questions we have raised thus far."

== See also ==
- Waterboarding
- List of methods of torture
- Torture
