= Al-Marri v. Spagone =

- Supreme Court of the United States

Decided March 6, 2009
- Full case name: Ali Saleh Kahlah al-Marri, Petitioner v. Daniel Spagone, United States Navy Commander, Consolidated Naval Brig
- Docket no.: 08-368
- Citations: 555 U.S. 1220 (more) 129 S. Ct. 1545; 173 L. Ed. 2d 671; 2009 U.S. LEXIS 1777; 77 U.S.L.W. 3502; 21 Fla. L. Weekly Fed. S 701

Case history
- Prior: Writ of Certiorari to the United States Court of Appeals for the Fourth Circuit
- Subsequent: Dismissed as moot

Questions presented
- Whether U.S. residents can be imprisoned indefinitely for suspected wrongdoing without being charged with a crime and tried before a jury.

Court membership
- Chief Justice John Roberts Associate Justices John P. Stevens · Antonin Scalia; Anthony Kennedy · David Souter; Clarence Thomas · Ruth Bader Ginsburg; Stephen Breyer · Samuel Alito

Al-Marri v. Spagone, 555 U.S. 1220 (2009), was a legal case in which the United States Supreme Court had to decide whether individuals can be imprisoned indefinitely for suspected wrongdoing without being charged with a crime and tried before a jury. The case was dismissed as moot on March 6, 2009, by the application of the Acting Solicitor General to transfer petitioner from military custody to the custody of the Attorney General.

The Fourth Circuit had ruled that a United States resident cannot be held on suspicion of terrorist activities, but must be charged in a domestic court or released.

== Background ==
The federal government arrested Ali Saleh Kahlah al-Marri on December 12, 2001, and indicted him on charges two years later on apparently unrelated charges of credit card fraud and assorted crimes of dishonesty.

On June 23, 2003, President George W. Bush's administration determined al-Marri to be an enemy combatant and ordered him transferred to the custody of the U.S. Department of Defense. The federal government asserts he is a sleeper agent for the terrorist organization Al-Qaeda, sent to the United States to explore disruptions of the country's financial systems. This was said to justify his detention without trial in civilian courts. Since that time, he has been held at the naval brig in Charleston, South Carolina. He is the only known enemy combatant to be held in military custody on U.S. soil (others are being held at the Guantanamo Bay detention camp in Cuba).

== Fourth Circuit decision ==
Judge Diana Gribbon Motz wrote the plurality opinion, which held that, as a legal resident of the United States who was originally detained in the United States, al-Marri could not be held in military custody as an enemy combatant. The court also held that the Military Commissions Act does not strip federal courts of jurisdiction to hear habeas corpus petitions from alleged enemy combatants arrested and detained within the borders of the United States. The court ordered the government to either charge al-Marri with a crime, initiate deportation proceedings, or release him.

Dissenting from the opinion, Judge Henry E. Hudson indicated that he believed Bush possessed the authority to detain alleged sleeper agents such as al-Marri, "the type of stealth warrior used by Al Qaeda".

The decision of Judge Motz was subsequently set aside and the case was reheard en banc on August 22, 2007, by the entire Fourth Circuit Court of Appeals. In a plurality opinion issued on July 15, 2008, the court held that the president did have authority to hold al-Marri in military custody, but that al-Marri was entitled to a greater, but undefined, degree of due process in his habeas corpus petition than had been accorded by the court below. The Supreme Court granted certiorari.

Shortly following his becoming president, President Barack Obama ordered al-Marri transferred to civilian authorities, and the Supreme Court dismissed the case as moot on March 6, 2009. al-Marri was subsequently prosecuted in civilian court and pleaded guilty. He had been imprisoned for eight years without charges.

== See also ==
- Habeas corpus
- United States v. Munsingwear, Inc., 340 U.S. 36 (1950)
