= Poems from Guantánamo =

Poems From Guantánamo: The Detainees Speak
- Author: Marc Falkoff
- Language: English
- Publisher: University of Iowa Press
- Publication date: 2007
- Publication place: United States
- Pages: 84 pp

Poems from Guantanamo: The Detainees Speak is an anthology of 22 poems by 17 Guantanamo detainees published by Marc Falkoff, a US professor of law with a doctorate in American literature.

== Contents ==
- They Fight for Peace, Shaker Aamer
- O Prison Darkness, Abdulaziz
- I Shall Not Complain, Abdulaziz
- To My Father, Abdullah Thani Faris al Anazi
- Lions in the Cage, Ustad Badruzzaman Badr
- Homeward Bound, Moazzam Begg
- Death Poem, Jumah al Dossari
- They Cannot Help, Shakih Abdurraheem Muslim Dost
- Cup Poem 1, Shakih Abdurraheem Muslim Dost
- Cup Poem 2, Shakih Abdurraheem Muslim Dost
- Two Fragments, Shakih Abdurraheem Muslim Dost
- First Poem of My Life, Mohammed el Gharani
- Humiliated in the Shackles, Sami al Haj
- The Truth, Emad Abdullah Hassan
- Is It True? Osama Abu Kabir
- Hunger Strike Poem, Adnan Farhan Abdul Latif
- I Am Sorry, My Brother, Othman Abdulraheem Mohammad
- Terrorist 2003, Martin Mubanga
- I Write My Hidden Longing, Abdulla Majid al Noaimi, the Captive of Dignity
- My Heart Was Wounded by the Strangeness, Abdulla Majid al Noaimi, the Captive of Dignity
- Ode to the Sea, Ibrahim al Rubaish
- Even if the Pain, Siddiq Turkestani

== See also ==
- Shaker Aamer
