= Bilal Hussein (photojournalist) =

Iraqi journalist

Bilal Hussein (Arabic: بلال حسين, romanized: Bilāl Ḥusayn) is an Iraqi Associated Press photojournalist based in Fallujah, Iraq. He was arrested in Ramadi by U.S. forces in April 2006 and detained on suspicion of aiding insurgents in Iraq. He was taken into custody to face charges in the Iraqi Central Court, reportedly over the circumstances of his photos, which were supplied by the U.S. military. American and Iraqi governments were criticized for violating the Geneva Conventions, and for detaining Hussein without evidence. He was finally released without charge in 2008. That year, Hussein won an International Press Freedom Award.

One of his photographs was among a group of 20 Associated Press photographs that won the 2005 Pulitzer Prize for Breaking News Photography. His was an image of four insurgents in Fallujah firing a mortar and small arms during the U.S.-led offensive in the city in November 2004.

On September 17, 2006, the AP reported that Hussein had been imprisoned by the United States military since April 2006 without publicly known charges or hearings; his captors citing "imperative reasons of security" under United Nations resolutions. Hussein was taken into U.S. custody on April 12, 2006 in Ramadi, Iraq, and had since been held without charge. On November 20, 2007, the US military announced that they would soon be bringing criminal charges against Hussein, and would be turning the case over to Iraqi judges. On April 9, 2008 an Iraqi judicial panel ordered Hussein's release, ruling (according to the AP) that he was covered by an Iraqi amnesty law. On April 14, 2008 the US military announced it would release Hussein from custody by April 16 of that year, saying only that "he no longer presents an imperative threat to security".

== Background ==
Hussein is an Iraqi citizen and shopkeeper who in 2003 was living with his family in Fallujah, where he sold cell phones and computers. During the Iraq War, the Associated Press (AP) hired him as a general helper because of his local knowledge, in what is described as a typical path for locally hired staff in the middle of a conflict. According to Santiago Lyon, AP's director of photography, in 2004, as the situation in Fallujah worsened, Hussein was given training in photography and camera equipment. He was hired by AP in September 2004 as a freelancer, paid on a per-picture basis. During Operation Phantom Fury, Hussein's family left, but he stayed behind. He photographed "not only the results of the attacks on Fallujah, [but] also ... members of the insurgency on occasion," according to Lyon.

Hussein finally left the city and reached Baghdad, sans camera, (which the AP replaced). He went to Ramadi in early 2005.

== Imprisonment ==
=== Allegations ===
According to the U.S. Military (none of whose allegations has been upheld in any court), Hussein was arrested in April 2006 in Ramadi, when US forces allegedly found bomb parts and insurgent propaganda in his house, after asking to use it as an observation post during an operation. The military also claimed that Hussein was found with two insurgents, including Hamid Hamad Motib, an alleged leader of al-Qaida terrorists in Iraq. According to a May 7, 2006 e-mail from U.S. Army Major General Jack Gardner,

He has close relationships with persons known to be responsible for kidnappings, smuggling, improvised explosive device (IED) attacks and other attacks on coalition forces." Gardner alleged, "The information available establishes that he has relationships with insurgents and is afforded access to insurgent activities outside the normal scope afforded to journalists conducting legitimate activities.

The U.S. military released Hussein on April 14, 2008, saying that they no longer considered him an "imperative threat."

According to Badie Arief Izzat, his Iraqi lawyer, Hussein is innocent. The photographer believes he is being targeted by the U.S. military due to the politically sensitive nature of photographs he has taken.

=== Associated Press response ===
In September 17, 2006, Tom Curley, AP president and chief executive, said, "Bilal Hussein has been held in violation of Iraqi law and in disregard to the Geneva Conventions. He must be charged under the Iraqi system or released immediately." The AP contacted military leaders in Iraq and The Pentagon, and later the U.S. ambassador to Iraq, Zalmay Khalilzad, to try to get more information about the allegations and to have the case transferred to the Iraqi criminal justice system. According to Curley, the Associated Press had been working quietly until then, but since the US military showed no sign of changing their stance, they considered it best to make the imprisonment public.

After hearing of the charges, Curley said,

"We have grave concerns that his rights under the law continue to be ignored and even abused...The steps the U.S. military is now taking continue to deny Bilal his right to due process...represents a miscarriage of the very justice and rule of law that the United States is claiming to help Iraq achieve...At this point, we believe the correct recourse is the immediate release of Bilal." AP attorney Dave Tomlin has commented, "This is not due process, not anything like due process."

Kathleen Carroll, AP's executive editor, argued that Hussein's being found with insurgents did not mean that he was one of them. "Journalists have always had relationships with people that others might find unsavory," she said. "We're not in this to choose sides, we're to report what's going on from all sides."

Other AP executives said that their review of Hussein's work did not find anything to indicate inappropriate contact with insurgents, and any evidence against him should be brought to the Iraqi criminal justice system. Of the 420 of Hussein's photographs that the AP reviewed, Lyon said that only 37 photos show insurgents or people who could be insurgents; "The vast majority of the 420 images show the aftermath or the results of the conflict - blown up houses, wounded people, dead people, street scenes."

In urging the release of Hussein, in September 2006, AP officials noted that he was "one of an estimated 14,000 people detained as suspected security threats by the U.S. military worldwide — 13,000 of them in Iraq. Few are charged with a specific crime or given a chance before any court or tribunal to argue for their freedom."

AP executives said that the US military has not provided any concrete evidence to back up the allegations they have raised about him. AP International Editor John Daniszewski said that the AP was told that Hussein was involved with the kidnapping of two Arab journalists in Ramadi. When the AP tracked down the journalists, the men said that Hussein had helped them after they were released by their captors without money or a vehicle. The two journalists also said that they had never been contacted for their account by multinational forces. Scott Horton, a human rights lawyer in New York hired by the AP to work on Hussein's case, said that the military has provided contradictory accounts of whether Hussein was targeted or simply caught up in a broader sweep.

When Hussein was freed in 2008, the AP denied he had any "improper contacts." It said "he was just doing his job."

=== Other responses ===
The New York-based Committee to Protect Journalists said in 2005 it had documented seven cases like that of Hussein, of Iraqi journalists detained by US forces without charge since the start of the 2003 invasion of Iraq.

Hussein has been criticized by conservatives on the Internet, who raised questions about his images months before he was detained. One blogger, Michelle Malkin, wrote about him on the day of his arrest, citing an anonymous military source in Iraq.

=== Ending of legal proceedings ===
On April 7, 2008 an Iraqi court found that Bilal Hussein's case fell under an existing amnesty regulation. It directed the prosecutor to "cease legal proceedings" and ordered Hussein's "immediate" release unless other charges were pending. A Pentagon spokesman said that the decision on Hussein's release would be made by "officials" in Iraq, "based upon their assessment as to whether he remains a threat." On April 14, 2008 the US military announced that they no longer considered Hussein an "imperative threat." He was released on April 16, 2008

== Award ==
In 2008, Hussein won an International Press Freedom Award from the Committee to Protect Journalists. The award is given for journalists who show courage in defending press freedom in the face of attacks, threats or imprisonment.
