= Azmy Abdelwahab =

Egyptian poet

- Born: Dakahlia governorate
- Years active: 1995–present
- Notable work: The Windows Have No Effect (Alnawafith la Athar Laha) Names Do Not Fit The Places ( Asma La Taliq blamakin) With Many Black Lies (bikatheeb Sawdaa Katheera)
- Children: Ahmed- Nourhan- Mohammed

Azmy Abdelwahab (Arabic: عزمي عبدالوهاب) is an Egyptian poet. He published many books and collections of poetry, including The Windows Have No Trace (Alnwafith La Athr Laha), Names Do not Belong to Places (Asma la Talig BilAmakn), by many Black Lies (bi akhatheeb Sawdaa' Kathera), The Old lighthouse Keeper (Hares Alfanar Alajouz) and many other pieces of writing. Along with being an active periodical writer and publisher for a number of websites on the internet. Most of these writings are related to reading and writing generally and poetry particularly.

== Career ==
Abdelwahab's career started in the field of poetry early, when he published a collection of poems entitled Names Do Not Belong to Places. In this book, he tried to write how he wanted the world to be. He discussed how women are an important element in life and most precious homeland, and how the alienation in the country or abroad hurts the soul. Azmy - as he mentioned in one of the press interviews - renamed things using inspiration and a simple way in imagination, through which he sends a message that the recipient understands. Azmy's drawing in this book - according to critics -A palette of contradictions during his work where women and the homeland, citizenship, alienation, loss, and creativity. Therefore, you see through the Diwan the dominant woman as a consolidation of the state of loss, love, reassurance and loss and is considered an objective equivalent to all these cases.

In 2014, Azmy published his second collection of poetry, A Person Worthy of Hate, by Dar Al-Nahda Al-Arabiya, in which he presented a new vision of the world around him, putting on new clothes, meanings, events and ideas. His book was published with Dostoevsky's saying summarizing his suffering that melted him in my literary work: "Life Above Forty is a Very Critical Matter". Abdelwahab focused in this poetry collection also on the subject of women and the world full of contradictions of puzzles, simplicity, originality, imagination, tenderness and deprivation. As for the title of the book, Abdelwahab believes that this person deserves to be hated - the hero of the story - because he is tired of his girlfriend staying away from him or giving her love to someone who does not deserve him.

Two years later, the Egyptian poet published a new collection of poetry, Walk in the Storm, published by Dar Afaq, which is the seventh of the poet's published works. The Diwan consists of four different poems: "For a Man who Carried the Sea on his Shoulders", "I Will Tell You a Lot", "Walking in the Storm", and “leave Him Alone, Haneen". This book was different from its predecessors in terms of form, as it It included rather long poems celebrating the scenery and poetic narration, as well as some short syllabic poems. This book was a political par excellence. It dealt with topics that were witnessed in the Egyptian arena at the time. Rather, the poet used terms such as "revolution", "military", "Brotherhood", "Salafis", and other vocabulary that belongs to the public space.included somewhat long poems celebrating the scenery and poetic narration, in addition to some short syllabic poems. This book was a political par excellence. It dealt with topics that were witnessed in the Egyptian arena at the time.

In mid-2019, Azmy published a new book under the title Faces that Look out from the Mirrors of the Soul, and the Egyptian poet says about this title that it is "an elusive title, for those who read the book might think of its title as a collection of poetry, but if he unpacks and reads, he will face approaches to more than thirty autobiographies. Arabic written by thinkers, writers and critics, and the writer who summons faces from his memory to emerge from the mirrors of his soul speaking for itself. In this book, Azmy narrated some biographies that represent another life that the reader did not live with his favorite writer.

The book includes a number of chapters, the most prominent of which is the chapter “I Am One of Those,” in which he declares his affiliation with the ones he loves and chooses to tell the readers about them. The book is divided into six chapters, each of which includes an approach to more than one biography. The writer seeks a connecting thread between them, making it a title for the chapter. The biographies of poets, for example, make the title of the chapter that includes it "Poets of Grief and Resident Death", while the last chapter, entitled "Women in the Face of the Storm", includes names such as Latifa Al-Zayat, Fadwa Toukan and Fatima Mernissi.

== Points of view ==
Azmy Abdelwahab has always emphasized in a number of his press statements that he is against the idea of civilization that consumes the soul of man and against the brutality and incursion of the city. He has confirmed on more than one occasion that the prose poem does not receive the appropriate appreciation that it deserves, despite the achievement of its poets, adding that some see it as “incomplete poetry,” so it does not receive a warm welcome from official institutions and is not given awards or honors.

Azmy also saw that completeness is an illusion, and every completeness carries within it some deficiency, emphasizing at the same time that what he described as great experiences are never complete, but always need someone who believes that he is able to add a line to them. However, Azmy says that "the prose poem always welcomes its presence in the margins, it does not like the text, and the moment it turns into a text, it will lose many of its justifications for its existence. Therefore, we should not, look for official recognition granting awards and respect on it."

== Works ==
This is a list of his most prominent works:

- "The Windows Have No Effect" (Alnawafith la Athar Laha)
- "Names Do Not Fit The Places" (Asma La Taliq blamakin)
- "With Many Black Lies" (bikatheeb Sawdaa Katheera)
- "Immediately After The Departure Of The Angel" (Mubashara baad Khuruj Almalak)
- "The Old Lighthouse Guard" (Hares Alfananr Alajouz)
- "Hateful Person" (Shakhs Jadeer bilkaraheyah)
- "Faces Peeking Out From The Mirrors Of The Soul" (Wojouh Tatil min Maraia Alrouh)
- "Walking In The Storm" (Yamshi fi Alasifah)
