= Baher Azmy =

American lawyer

- Citizenship: American
- Education: University of Pennsylvania (BA); Columbia University (MPA); New York University School of Law (JD)
- Occupations: Lawyer; Legal scholar
- Employer: Center for Constitutional Rights
- Known for: Constitutional law litigation Guantánamo detainee representation Civil rights advocacy
- Title: Legal Director

Baher Azmy is an American lawyer and professor of law at Seton Hall University, specializing in constitutional law.

== Education ==
Azmy received his Juris Doctor from New York University School of Law, an MPA from Columbia University, and a BA from University of Pennsylvania.

== Career ==
After law school Azmy clerked for Dolores K. Sloviter, Chief Judge of the Third Circuit Court of Appeals in Philadelphia.

In 2005 Azmy started working at the Center for Constitutional Rights, which provides legal assistance to communities under threat, including the prisoners held in extrajudicial detention in the Guantanamo Bay detention camps in Cuba. Azmy was the lawyer for Guantanamo captive Murat Kurnaz. Azmy shared his experiences defending Kurnaz on the Peabody Award-winning episode of This American Life entitled "Habeas Shmabeas".

== See also ==
- Mark P. Denbeaux
- Seton Hall reports
- Unlawful combatant
