= Camp seven (Guantanamo) =

Most secure camp in the Guantanamo Bay detention complex

Coordinates: 19°54′49.69″N 75°07′18.85″W

Camp Seven (also known as Camp Platinum) is the most secure camp known within the Guantanamo Bay detention camps, in Cuba.

Its existence was kept secret for the first two years of its use. It was constructed to hold the fourteen "high-value detainees" who had been held by the CIA, and were transferred to military custody on 6 September 2006.

== Details ==
The detainees held in this camp are placed in hoods when transferred from the camp to other locations for their military commission or other purposes. Some of the detainees, who faced charges before the Guantanamo military commissions, had attorneys who were initially told that they could not interview their clients. The attorneys were told it would be a breach of the camp's security for them to know the camp's location. When attorneys Suzanne Lachelier and Richard Federico offered to wear the same hoods the detainees wore to visit the camp, they were eventually allowed to visit the camp without wearing blindfolds. They were transported to the camp in the same windowless van as the detainees, so they did not know the camp's location.

Attorney James Connell was the first person to visit a client at the prison. He visited his client Ammar al Baluchi at Camp 7 in August 2013.

A 2013 budget request from the United States Southern Command for new prison construction at the base was presumed by reports to be for the replacement of Camp 7, though specifics of existing facilities were not discussed.

According to an article by Carol Rosenberg, published in The New York Times, on 17 September 2019, Camp Seven had at least two recreation yards. At a preliminary hearing held that day prosecutors read a transcript of a conversation Ammar al Baluchi had with another captive, conducted by yelling over the wall of his recreation yard to the nearby recreation yard of the other man. It had not been known, until the release of this transcript, that the recreation yards contained hidden listening devices.

== See also ==
- Camp No—an alleged secret detention and interrogation facility
