= Strawberry Fields (Guantanamo) =

American military detention compound in Cuba

Coordinates: 19.90°N 75.11°W

In 2003, a secret compound, known as Strawberry Fields, was constructed near the main Guantanamo Bay detention camps, in Cuba. In August 2010 reporters found that it had been constructed to hold CIA detainees classified as "high value". These were among the many men known as ghost detainees, as they were ultimately held for years for interrogation by the CIA in its secret prisons known as black sites at various places in Europe, the Mideast, and Asia, including Afghanistan.

Matt Apuzzo and Adam Goldman reported on August 7, 2010, for the Associated Press that the "high value detainees" Abu Zubaydah, Abd al-Nashiri, Ramzi bin al-Shibh, and Mustafa al-Hawsawi, had first been transferred to military custody at Guantanamo on September 24, 2003. They reported that CIA agents thought they had learned most of the information to be extracted from these individuals. At the time, the CIA thought the men could be held securely and secretly at Guantanamo, without any prospect of the public learning that they had been subjected to what United States courts have determined is torture, including waterboarding, one of the euphemistically termed enhanced interrogation techniques. These techniques had been specifically authorized by political appointees in the Office of Legal Counsel, Department of Justice (DOJ), in the Bush administration, in August 2002, in what came to be known as the Torture Memos.

David Johnston and Mark Mazzetti also described the camp in The New York Times in August 2009. They quoted CIA officials, who said that the camp's nickname in 2003 was a reference to the Beatles' song "Strawberry Fields Forever", because the detainees would be held there "forever".

As the habeas corpus petitions collectively known as Rasul v. Bush made their way to the United States Supreme Court for its ruling in 2004, the CIA took the four men back into their custody. Apuuzo and Goldman report the Bush government returned the men to CIA custody three months before the Supreme Court's ruling, to avoid the possibility of having to release any information about them.

The Supreme Court held that detainees had the right of habeas corpus to challenge their detention before an impartial forum, and none had seen counsel. Up until that time, no detainees had been able to challenge the grounds of his detention. The Supreme Court's ruling would have compelled at least some information about the four detainees to be publicly revealed.

According to Scott Horton, writing for Harper's Magazine in August 2010, the men were removed from Guantanamo on March 27, 2004. Horton described the men's covert removal as an instance of "Three-Card Monte at Gitmo".

In continuing challenges to the secrecy imposed by the Bush administration, in January 2006, US District Court Judge Jed S. Rakoff ruled that the United States Department of Defense had to publish a list of all the detainees who had been held in Guantanamo by March 3, 2006.

On May 15, 2006, the DOD published a list of 759 names, which included persons held at the camp from January 2002 to May 15, 2006. By 2006, hundreds had already been released without charges. This list did not include Abu Zubaydah, Abd al-Nashiri, Ramzi bin al-Shibh or Mustafa al-Hawsawi.

In Hamdan v. Rumsfeld (2006), the Supreme Court ruled that the Bush administration's process of Combatant Status Review Tribunals and military commissions was unconstitutional, as the executive branch had set up a separate justice system outside the federal and military systems, which was not authorized by Congress. The administration worked to gain legislation for its goals.

These four men and ten other "high-value detainees" were transferred from CIA to military custody at Guantanamo in September 2006, by which time the Bush administration was assured of passage of the Military Commissions Act of 2006. The legislation was signed in October. Passed by Congress to authorize the military tribunals the administration wanted for trying detainees, its provisions included a restriction against detainees using federal courts for habeas corpus actions. All pending habeas cases were stayed as a result of the act.

In Boumediene v. Bush (2008), the Supreme Court ruled that the MCA was unconstitutional, as detainees could not be deprived of their fundamental right of habeas corpus. It also ruled that they could access federal courts directly, which the Bush administration had sought to prevent. Numerous actions were refiled in federal courts.

== Penny Lane ==
On November 25, 2013, Goldman and Apuzzo of the Associated Press reported that the CIA operated a second secret camp on the Guantanamo Naval Base, from 2002 to as late as 2006. This base, called Penny Lane, was used to hold captives who were under consideration for being recruited as double agents, who would surreptitiously penetrate, and inform on, al-Qaeda, the Taliban, and other groups suspected of being allied with them. Its name, Penny Lane, like Strawberry Fields, was taken from a song from the Beatles' Magical Mystery Tour (1967) album.

== See also ==
- Ghost detainee
- Extraordinary rendition by the United States
