= Yasser Talal Al Zahrani =

Saudi Arabian Guantanamo detainee

Yasser Talal al Zahrani
- Born: September 22, 1984; Yanbu, Saudi Arabia
- Arrested: Faisalabad, Pakistan; Pakistani security officials
- Died: June 10, 2006 (aged 21); Guantánamo Bay, Cuba
- Detained at: Guantanamo
- Other name: Yasser Talal Abdullah Yahya al Zahran
- ISN: 93
- Charge: No charge (extrajudicial detention)
- Status: Death in custody

Yasser Talal al Zahrani (September 22, 1984 – June 10, 2006) was a citizen of Saudi Arabia who was held in extrajudicial detention in the United States Guantanamo Bay detainment camps, in Cuba. His Guantanamo Internment Serial Number was 93. The Department of Defense (DoD) reported that he was born on September 22, 1984, in Saudi Arabia. At the time of his capture, al-Zahrani was initially suspected of being "a front line fighter for the Taliban", though he was later considered "second line". He was also suspected of arranging weapons purchases.

In 2006, while in detention, he wrote a letter to his father, Colonel Talal al-Zahrani, a former Brigadier General in the Saudi police force, that suggested that two prisoners seemed to be on the verge of death, and that he suspected foul play. Ten days later, the Department of Defense announced that he and the two prisoners had committed suicide. The press, the Saudi government, the detainees' families, and human rights groups have raised serious questions about whether these deaths were suicides or manslaughter due to torture.

== Combatant Status Review ==
A Summary of Evidence memo was prepared for the tribunal. His memo accused him of the following:

- That he had arrived in Afghanistan in July 2001.
- That he had trained at an Afghan training camp, near Konduz
- That he had served on the second line, near Konduz, in the second week of September 2001.

=== Administrative Review Board ===
Detainees whose Combatant Status Review Tribunal labeled them "enemy combatants" were scheduled for annual Administrative Review Board hearings. These hearings were designed to assess the threat a detainee might pose if released or transferred, and whether there were other factors that warranted his continued detention.

=== Allegations ===
There is no record that Yasser Talal Al Zahrani chose to attend his hearing. The Summary of Evidence memo prepared for his hearing listed 26 factors favoring his continued detention.

The factors stated:

- That he decided to travel to Afghanistan, instead of finishing high school, in August 2001.
- That he trained at the Taliban's Konduz Center, and at al Qaida's al Farouq training camp.
- That he was a financial courier.
- That he had ties to various senior al Qaida and Taliban leaders.
- That he served as security guard for three months
- That he was captured, and sent to a prison in Mazari Sharif, and was injured during the prison riot at Qali Jangi in early November.

== Death ==
On June 10, 2006, the DoD reported that three Guantanamo detainees: two Saudis and one Yemeni, had committed suicide. DoD spokesmen refrained from releasing the dead men's identities.

On June 11, 2006, Saudi authorities released the names of the two Saudi men. One was identified as al-Zahrani. The other Saudi was identified as both Maniy bin Shaman al-Otaibi and Mani bin Shaman bin Turki al Habradi. Neither of these names is on either of the two official lists of Guantanamo names the DoD has released.

== Al Zahrani's age ==
Abdulla Majid Al Naimi, a detainee from Bahrain, was released on November 8, 2005. On June 25, 2006, he made a public statement about the deaths, saying he had known the three men and disputed that they had committed suicide. He said that al-Zahrani was only 16 when he was captured. He thought the youth should have been treated as a minor.

He said,

He was 21 when he died, barely the legal age in most countries, and was merely 16 when he was picked up four and half years ago. His age shows that he is not even supposed to be taken to a police office; he should have been turned over to the underage [juvenile] authorities.

== Recent letter to his father ==
The New York Times reported that al-Zahrani's father, Talal Abdallah al-Zahrani, had recently received a letter from his son in which he seemed to be in good spirits. He said: "Nothing suggested that he would commit suicide, nothing."

Al Zahrani also disputed the US report that his son was non-compliant, saying his son had spent his time memorizing the Koran, and had been behaving. Al Zahrani said that his son had been in Afghanistan working for Islamic charities.

== Letter of June 1 ==
The English language Arab newspaper Asharq Alawsat reported that a letter a detainee had " ... written ten days before the Pentagon announced three inmates had committed suicide on June 10 ... " appears to report that " ... Two detainees are on the verge of death… perhaps they are dying or have died poisoned. ... " Asharq Alawsat asserts that the two detainees on the verge of death were two of the men the USA claimed committed suicide.

Asharq Alawsat reports that the letter was handed by the detainee, to his lawyer, who turned it over to Talal Al Zahrani's father's lawyer. Asharq Alawsat reports that the detainee's name is being kept confidential, for his safety.

Guantanamo attorneys must all agree that they must turn over all their notes and other documents before they leave Guantanamo. They have to report to a secure document center in Washington DC center in order to review their own notes. If a detainee authored a letter suggesting Talal Al-Zahrani and the two other men didn't really commit suicide, keeping his identity confidential could not have prevented the DoD from learning his identity.

== Post mortems ==
Guantanamo camp authorities conducted post mortems on the three dead men, before their bodies were shipped home. Al Zahrani's father has called for a second post mortem by neutral, independent pathologists.

Al Zahrani's father claimed that after his own examination of his son's corpse he was convinced he bore the marks of a beating. He sees this as confirming his skepticism that Al Zahrani did not commit suicide, but was murdered.

Al Utaybi's family reported that his Saudi post-mortem had found that the DoD had retained Al Utaybi's brain, heart, liver and kidneys.

Patrice Mangin, a widely published forensic pathologist, headed the team that volunteered to provide neutral, independent second autopsies for the three dead men. After their examination of Ahmed's body, he said that it was routine for pathologists to remove some organs that decay rapidly. However, they had also found that the DoD had retained Ahmed's throat, which his team would need to examine before they offered a definitive conclusion as to how he died.

Mangin asked the DoD to supply his team with Ahmed's throat, and with the bed sheets they claimed had been used to hang the three men.

== Weight reports ==
The Center for the Study of Human Rights at the University of California (Davis) published the official record of Al Zahrani's weigh-in reports.

== NCIS Report ==
On August 23, 2008 Josh White writing in The Washington Post reported the paper had received 3,000 pages of documents arising from the NCIS investigation through Freedom of Information Act requests. He reported that the NCIS report attributed the deaths to lapses on the part of the guards, and to a policy of leniency for the compliant captives.

The report said the deaths were in Camp 1, which has now been closed, a camp for compliant captives, and that the men's bodies were masked by laundry they were allowed to hang up to dry.

== Outstanding habeas petition ==
Yassar Talal al-Zahrani and fellow Saudi Salah Addin Ali Ahmed Al-Salami had habeas corpus petitions filed on their behalf, prior to their deaths. In December 2009 the Obama Presidency argued that their petitions should be quashed, because their CSR Tribunals had determined that they were "enemy combatants". Talal al-Zahrani's father countered: "It doesn't really matter if this was an intentional death or an accidental death or suicide. The point is that the U.S. government bears responsibility."

== Media representations ==
Death in Camp Delta was directed by the Norwegian filmmaker, Erling Borgen.

== See also ==
- Juveniles held at the Guantanamo Bay detention camp
- Salah Ali Abdullah Ahmed al-Salami
- Mani Shaman Turki al-Habardi Al-Utaybi
