= Ali Abdullah Ahmed =

Yemeni Guantanamo Bay detainee (1979–2006)

- Born: August 1, 1979; Ibb, Yemen
- Died: June 10, 2006 (aged 26); Guantanamo Bay detention camp, Cuba
- Detained at: Guantanamo Bay, Cuba
- Other name: Salah Addin Ali Ahmed Al-Salami
- ISN: 693
- Charge: No charge (extrajudicial detention)
- Status: Death in custody

Ali Abdullah Ahmed, also known as Salah Ahmed al-Salami (Arabic: علي عبدالله احمد) (August 1, 1979 – June 10, 2006), was a citizen of Yemen who died whilst being held as an enemy combatant in the United States Guantanamo Bay detainment camps, in Cuba. His Guantanamo Internment Serial Number was 693. Joint Task Force Guantanamo counter-terror analysts estimated he was born in 1977, in Ibb, Yemen.

Ali Abdullah Ahmed died in custody on June 10, 2006. His death was announced by the Department of Defense as a suicide, on the same day that the deaths of two other detainees were said to be suicides. The three deaths on the same day received wide coverage in the media.

His younger brother, Muhammaed Yasir Ahmed Taher, also known as Yasir al-Simli, was also held in Guantanamo, until 2009. He was killed by a missile, launched from a drone, on March 2, 2017.

== Early life and background ==
Ali Abdullah Ahmed was born in Yemen in 1979 and raised in a Muslim family.

== Hunger strike and forced feeding ==
At its height more than 100 Guantanamo detainees participated in this hunger strike in 2005. The Department of Defense's position was that detainees did not have the right to refuse medical treatment and had the guards force-feed them.

Approximately three dozen detainees were participating in the hunger strike in January 2006, when the DOD instituted a new measure—the use of "restraint chairs". Detainees were strapped immobile in the restraint chairs during the force-feeding, and for a period of time afterward. DOD said this was done to ensure that the detainees could not induce vomiting and void the force-fed formula before digestion began. Detainees claimed that the force-feeding caused extremely painful cramps, and that they were kept restrained for hours, even if they soiled themselves. DOD said their policy authorized restraining the detainees immobile for only 45 minutes following the end of the force-feeding.

All but four of the hunger strikers ended their hunger strike a few days after the initiation of the use of the restraint chair in January 2006. The Washington Post reported that Ahmed continued his hunger strike from late 2005 to May 2006.

== Death in custody ==
On June 10, 2006, DOD reported that three Guantanamo detainees: two Saudis and one Yemeni, had committed suicide. DOD spokesmen refrained from releasing the names of the dead men.

The next day, June 11, 2006, Saudi Arabian authorities released the names of the two Saudi men. Later that day, the DOD released the names of all three men. The dead Yemeni man was identified by DOD for the first time as Ali Abdullah Ahmed. The dead Saudis were identified as Yasser Talal Al Zahrani and Mani Shaman Turki al-Habardi Al-Utaybi.

== Official account ==
At the time, The Washington Post'' reported that DOD alleged Ahmed: "was a mid- to high-level al-Qaeda operative who had key ties to principal facilitators and senior members of the group.'"—and that "Throughout his time in Guantanamo, he had been non-compliant and hostile to the guard force".

In 2008, however, The Washington Post received thousands of pages of documents related to a longstanding FOIA request, and related to the NCIS report published in August. The journalist Josh White found the following about Ahmed in a "previously secret" document:

Although many of the individuals apprehended during the raid have strong connections to al Qaeda, there is no credible information to suggest Ahmed received terrorist related training or is a member of the al Qaeda network.

In 2006, the Post said that Ahmed was a "long-term hunger striker."There were several widespread hunger strikes during 2005. A widespread hunger strike that began in late May 2005 or early June 2005 came to a negotiated end on July 28, 2005. Detainees report the camp authorities had agreed to several key concessions but did not carry them out. The detainees resumed the hunger strike on August 8, 2005.

Initially the DOD reported that none of the three dead men had legal representation. On June 14, 2006, DOD acknowledged that Ahmed had legal representation. But they had not yet given his lawyers the security clearance required to visit with him.

Ali Abdullah Ahmed and Yasser Talal Al Zahrani had previously been listed on DOD's two official lists of detainees. The other Saudi was previously recorded as either "Maniy bin Shaman al-Otaibi" or "Mani bin Shaman bin Turki al Habradi", and had not appeared on either official list.

== Murder suggestions ==
On June 14, 2006, Ali Abdullah Ahmed's father claimed that, as a Muslim, his son would not have committed suicide. The father alleged that his son was "assassinated by American soldiers".

== Post-mortems ==
All three of the families of the dead men challenged the American post-mortems. The families all took steps to have second post-mortems done after the bodies were returned to them.

Some family members had expressed concerns when the bodies were missing the brain, liver, kidney, heart and other organs. Patrice Mangin, the Swiss pathologist who headed the team that volunteered to examine Al Salami's body, said that it was routine to remove some organs that decay rapidly. But, Mangin said that the US authorities had kept the organs of Al-Salami's throat, which was unusual, and his team could not determine fully whether he had hanged himself without being able to examine those.

In an interview in March 2007, Mangin said that the US officials had taken very good care in preservation when shipping the body to Yemen. Since his examination, he had requested the organs in writing from the United States; missing were some of the organs in the pharynx, larynx and the throat, such as the hyoid bone. He also asked questions about the body when found, but never received a response of any kind. He noted that the Saudi doctor who carried out the examination of the bodies of the two Saudi men also reported that the organs of the throats were missing.

== Habeas corpus ==
In 2005, attorneys had initiated a habeas corpus petition on behalf of Ali Abdullah Ahmed to challenge the government for the cause of his detention. Following the United States Supreme Court's finding in Boumediene v. Bush (2008), ruling that detainees and foreign nationals had the right of habeas corpus to sue in federal court, Ahmed's former attorneys re-initiated his habeas petition. They argued that the Department of Defense had withheld important information about Ahmed to substantiate its claim that he committed suicide.

They also filed a habeas corpus petition on behalf of Mohammed Ahmed Taher, on July 18, 2008, who they reported is the younger brother of the Yemeni captive identified by DOD as Salah al-Salami, or as Ali Abdullah Ahmed. The petition identifies Salah al-Salami as the Yemeni who died in custody on June 10, 2006. The petition for Mohammed Ahmed Taher reports that his mental stability has been seriously affected by his brother's death.

== NCIS Report ==
On August 23, 2008, Josh White, writing in the Washington Post, reported the paper had received 3,000 pages of documents related to the NCIS investigation through Freedom of Information Act requests. He reported that the NCIS report attributed the deaths of the three men to lapses on the part of the guards, and to a policy of leniency for the compliant captives.

The report said the deaths were in Camp 1, a camp for compliant captives, which has now been closed. The men's bodies were masked from view by the guards because of laundry they were allowed to hang up to dry. The NCIS report identified the dead Yemeni as "Ali Abdullah Ahmed Naser al-Sullami".

It quoted from what it claimed was Ahmed's suicide note:

I am informing you that I gave away the precious thing that I have in which it became very cheap, which is my own self, to lift up the oppression that is upon us through the American Government. I did not like the tube in my mouth, now go ahead and accept the rope in my neck.

The Post quoted the reaction of David Englehart, al-Salami's attorney, to the documents' release:

It's simply astounding that it took the government over two years to conclude a so-called investigation of three men who died in a small cage under the government's exclusive control. The investigation itself is what needs to be investigated, along with the people who've perpetrated the disgraceful, extra-constitutional detentions.

== Outstanding habeas petitions ==
Attorneys had also filed habeas corpus petitions for Salah al-Salami and fellow Saudi Yassar Talal al-Zahrani prior to their deaths. In December 2009, the Obama administration argued that the petitions of the late detainees should be quashed, because their CSRTs had determined that they were "enemy combatants".

Talal al-Zahrani's father countered: "It doesn't really matter if this was an intentional death or an accidental death or suicide. The point is that the U.S. government bears responsibility."

== Disputes over cause of death ==
Some former prisoners, including Murat Kurnaz, have said they believed that the three men were killed by guards at Guantanamo. His memoir, published in 2008, discussed the deaths of the men.

In December 2009, Seton Hall University School of Law published Death in Camp Delta, a report prepared under the supervision of its director of the Center for Policy and Research, Professor Mark Denbeaux, criticizing numerous inconsistencies in DOD's official accounts of these deaths. It is available online at Death in Camp Delta.

On January 18, 2010, Scott Horton of Harper’s Magazine published an article denouncing the deaths of Al-Salami, Al-Utaybi and Al-Zahrani as accidental manslaughter during a torture session at a black site, and the official account as a cover-up. He based his work on the accounts of four soldiers who had been serving at the camp at the time.

== See also ==
- Mani Shaman Turki al-Habardi Al-Utaybi
- Yasser Talal Al Zahrani
- Force feeding
