= Jerry Markon =

American journalist

Jerry Markon is an American journalist. He covered the United States Department of Homeland Security for The Washington Post until February 2017.

In 2017, Markon left The Washington Post to work on the Republican staff of the United States Senate Committee on Homeland Security and Governmental Affairs.
