= Patrice Mangin =

Professor Patrice Mangin is a widely published forensic pathologist and toxicologist, director of the University Center of Legal Medicine in Lausanne and Geneva, Switzerland.

== Education ==
Mangin graduated from the Faculty of medicine Broussais-Hôtel-Dieu, University René Descartes in 1973. In 1978 he obtained his M.D. thesis at Faculty of medicine, Louis Pasteur University - Strasbourg I and later got his board certification in legal medicine in France and Switzerland in 1980 and 1996 respectively. He defended his Ph.D thesis in toxicology under Professor of Pharmacy G. Dirrheimer at Louis Pasteur University - Strasbourg I in 1985. He was an intern and resident in various French hospitals, including Department of Clinical Neurophysiology at Hôpitaux universitaires de Strasbourg where he served from 1973 to 1977 and from 1978 to 1980 respectively.

== Career ==
Subsequently, Mangin was appointed as Attaché (Assistant in English) at the Institute of Legal and Social Medicine and then served on the Faculty of Medicine at the Louis Pasteur University as well as an Assistant Professor of Medicine at the same alma mater between 1981 and 1986. Following it, he became a Maître de conférences and medical practitioner at the Institute of Legal and Social Medicine, Faculty of medicine, University Louis Pasteur - Strasbourg I.

In 1990, Patrice Mangin was appointed as University Professor and medical practitioner at the Institute of Legal and Social Medicine and from 1990 to 1996 served as its director. Since 1996, he holds a title of Ordinarius Professor of Legal Medicine and works as a director of the University of Lausanne in Switzerland.

From 1999 to 2006 he was selected as Vice-Dean of the Faculty of Medicine, University of Lausanne and then served as a Dean of the Faculty of Biology and Medicine at the same place.

Since 2007, he is a Director and Ordinarius Professor of Legal Medicine at the University Center of Legal Medicine in Lausanne-Geneva, Switzerland. Moreover, since August 1, 2011, Prof. Mangin took over the leadership of the Department of Community Medicine and Health (DUMSC) of the University Hospital of Lausanne (CHUV).

== Professional societies memberships ==
Patrice Mangin is a member of a number of distinguished national and international professional societies, among of which are; the French Society of Legal Medicine, the International Academy of Legal Medicine of which he served as a treasurer from 2009 to 2012 and from 2012 to 2015 was its elected vice-president. He is also member of the American Academy of Forensic Sciences (AAFS), the International Society for Forensic Genetics, European Council of Legal Medicine of which he is a treasurer, and of The International Association of Forensic Toxicologists (TIAFT). He is member and former president of the Swiss Society of Legal Medicine.

Furthermore, he is a member of several editorial boards: International Journal of Legal Medicine, The American Journal of Forensic Medicine and Pathology, Journal de Médecine Légale et de Droit Médical, Law, Probability and Risk, Encyclopedia of Forensic Sciences, the Romanian Journal of Legal Medicine and Acta Medicinæ Legalis.

== The Al Salami case ==
Patrice Mangin headed an international pathology team that volunteered to examine the body of Salah Addin Ali Ahmed Al-Salami, a Yemeni detained in the United States Guantanamo Bay detainment camps, who died on June 10, 2006. American authorities said Al Salami and two Saudi men committed suicide by hanging themselves. Mangin reassured family members that it was routine for the American medical team to have removed some organs that decay rapidly, such as the brain, heart and liver. But he said that the Americans had retained the organs of Ahmed's throat: the larynx, hyoid bone and thyroid gland, which he needed to examine to determine whether Al Salami died by hanging.
