= Josh White (journalist) =

American journalist

Josh White is an American journalist. White writes for the Washington Post, but has been published in various publications, including the Los Angeles Times and The Guardian. He is also invited to serve as a commentator on Radio and Television. White has focussed on stories related to the United States prosecution of the War in Afghanistan and the War in Iraq.

== Education ==
White obtained his degree in political science from the University of Michigan. While attending the University of Michigan, he also was editor of the Michigan Daily.

== Personal ==
He was born and raised in the Boston area. White is married and has a daughter. The family resides in Arlington, Virginia.

== Career ==
White works for The Washington Post's Metro section as an investigative reporter. He began working for the Post in 1998. For six years, he worked on the Virginia staff where he covered police and courts in Prince William County. During his time on the Virginia staff, he also witnessed two electric chair executions. In April 2004, he moved to the Post's National desk to work as a military correspondent. Here he covered the Iraq and Afghanistan wars, military criminal justice, and Guantanamo Bay, Cuba. In October 2008, White returned to the Metro section to work as a regional investigative reporter on law enforcement. He also served as a Metro weekend editor. Between 2012 and 2016, he became education editor at the Washington Post. From 2017 to 2020, he was the paper's America desk editor. In 2020, White left the Washington Post to join the communications department at Amazon after Andy Jassy had become the new CEO of Amazon.

== Honors and awards ==
White worked with a team covering the Virginia Tech shooting massacre, which won the 2008 Pulitzer Prize. He was also a part of teams that were Pulitzer Prize finalist in 2005 and 2006.

== Controversy ==
White was criticized by commentators who characterized him as suggesting the Marines in the Haditha killings had breached their rules of engagement, without evidence to back up the suggestion.
