= Scott Horton (attorney) =

American lawyer

Scott Horton is an American attorney known for his work in human rights law and the law of armed conflict, as well as emerging markets and international law.

He graduated Texas Law School in Austin with a JD and was a partner in a large New York law firm, Patterson Belknap Webb & Tyler. He "has advised sovereigns on the pursuit of kleptocratic predecessors." In April 2007, he joined Harper's Magazine as a legal affairs and national security contributor, and he currently authors the No Comment blog at Harper's Online. Horton has also written for The American Lawyer, and The Daily Beast and has been interviewed on Antiwar Radio. and the John Batchelor Show.

Horton was a lecturer at Columbia Law School, as well as a co-founder of the American University in Central Asia and of Sanghata Global. Horton is a former president of the International League for Human Rights, and he recently contributed to a report which claimed that human rights standards apply to detainees captured by the U.S. in the war on terrorism. He "served as counsel to Andrei Sakharov and Elena Bonner, among other activists in the former Soviet Union."

== Bilal Hussein case ==
Horton was hired by the Associated Press to represent Bilal Hussein, a photojournalist who had won the Pulitzer Prize and was detained without charges by the US military for over a year.

== Matthew Diaz case ==
Horton has written blog posts on the Harper's Magazine website concerning the case of the Guantanamo Bay detention camp whistleblower Lieutenant Commander Matthew Diaz.

== Prescott Bush and Business Plot ==
In July 2007. Horton wrote an article in Harper's Magazine claiming that Prescott Bush, father of US President George H. W. Bush and grandfather of US president George W. Bush, was involved in the failed 1934 Business Plot, an attempt to remove US President Franklin D. Roosevelt from power.

However, no evidence from the source material of the congressional report or from contemporary news reports makes any mention of Bush's involvement.

== Raymond Azar ==
On August 28, 2009, Horton asserted that the treatment of Raymond Azar in Bagram Theater Internment Facility in April 2009 by Department of Justice officials was identical to the now-prohibited torture techniques that CIA snatch teams had once used on "high-value detainees" during the war on terror.
