= Matthew Diaz =

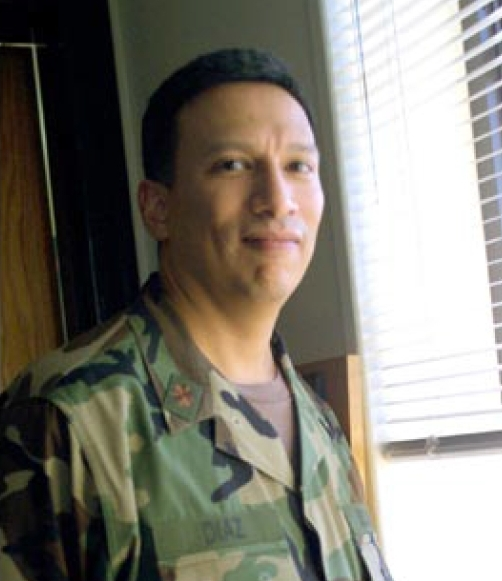
- Born: 1965 (age 60–61); Gary, Indiana, U.S.
- Occupation: lawyer
- Known for: leaked the names of Guantanamo captives prior to their official publication.
- Parent: Robert Rubane Diaz (Father)

Matthew Mark Diaz is a former active-duty Lieutenant Commander (LCDR) and Judge Advocate General's Corps (JAGC) officer in the United States Navy. In mid-to-late 2004, Diaz served a six-month tour of duty in Guantanamo Bay, Cuba as deputy director of the detention center's legal office. Early in 2005 as LCDR Diaz was concluding his tour, he sent an anonymous greeting card to The Center for Constitutional Rights, a New York civil liberties and human rights group. The card contained the names of the detainees held at the Guantanamo Bay detention camp. In July 2006, the United States government formally charged Diaz in a military court with five criminal counts related to the sending of these names, the most serious being that he intended to harm national security or advantage a foreign nation, a violation of the Espionage Act. In May 2007, he was convicted by a seven-member jury of military officers on 4 of 5 counts. He served a 6-month prison sentence and was dismissed from the military.

In April 2008, he was awarded the Ridenhour Prize for Truth Telling.

Diaz is currently employed with The Bronx Defenders as an intake coordinator.

== Family background ==
Diaz was born in 1965 in Gary, Indiana. He is one of six children. Diaz is a father to three children. His father is Robert Diaz, a California Registered Nurse convicted in 1984 for the murders of a dozen patients at two southern California hospitals. Robert Diaz's conviction was controversial, and he maintained his innocence until his death in 2010. Matthew Diaz dropped out of high school to enlist in the U.S. Army at the age of 17. He obtained his GED and a bachelor's degree in Criminology during his nearly nine years of Army service. After obtaining his Juris Doctor degree at Washburn University School of Law in 1994, Diaz was commissioned as a naval officer in the U.S. Navy's Judge Advocate General's Corps.

Diaz's father died of natural causes, while still in custody, in 2010.

== Military career ==
Diaz spent approximately twenty years in military service. Diaz dropped out of high school when he was 17 years old. Diaz served eight years as an enlisted man in the United States Army, prior to being commissioned in the USN's Judge Advocate General Corps. After law school, Matthew Diaz served his country as a deputy staff judge advocate at Guantánamo. Diaz received numerous awards throughout his career and received the highest praises of his superiors in annual fitness reports.

== Charges ==
On July 28, 2006, Diaz was formally charged with improperly mailing suspected classified information about detainees in the Guantanamo Bay detainment camps to an individual unauthorized to receive it, in this case the Center for Constitutional Rights. Diaz was convicted and on May 18, 2007, he was sentenced to six months in prison and faced dismissal from the Navy.

Scott Horton wrote:

Matthew Diaz found himself in a precarious position—as a uniformed officer, he was bound to follow his command. As a licensed and qualified attorney, he was bound to uphold the law. And these things were indubitably at odds.

== The suspect document ==
Barbara Olshansky, of the Center for Constitutional Rights, was the recipient of the document, placed alongside an unmarked Valentine's Day card. While Olshansky had requested a list of all detainees being held at Guantanamo Bay detainment camps, the military had failed to provide one. The list provided by Diaz contained the names of 550 captives. The list had seven fields per entry. The 558 names in the official list of captives whose enemy combatant status was confirmed by a Combatant Status Review Tribunal had just three fields. According to the background page to the charges against Diaz, the other six fields of the entries describing captives were:

Internment Serial Number	The two official lists both contain an ISN, which seems to be some kind of identification number, but they don't say what it is.; The ISN numbers of the 759 captives on the two official lists ran from 2 through 1457, with the exception of six captives who were captured in Bosnia, and Martin Mubanga who was captured in Africa. Their ISNs were in the range 10001 through 10007. The 14 high value captives transferred from CIA custody to military custody in Guantanamo all had ISN's in the range 10011 through 10024.
Source Identification number (if present)	?
GTMO Identification number	?
nationality country of citizenship	Both of the official lists name just one country associated with each captive.
Collection Management & Dissemination team number	?

The captives' names had not, at that time, been officially confirmed. Olshansky did not know what to make of receiving the list in this manner, so she contacted Federal authorities.

Diaz was not directly involved in either the defense or prosecution of the ten detainees who faced charges before the Guantanamo military commissions. He served as a legal advisor to the JTF-GTMO, the command responsible for detention operations.

== Profiled in The Guantanamo trap ==
Diaz was one of the four individuals profiled in the award-winning documentary The Guantanamo trap. The other three individuals were Murat Kurnaz, a former Guantanamo captive; Diane Beaver, another military lawyer, best known for drafting a memo later called "the torture memo"; and Gonzalo Boye a Spanish lawyer who tried to lay charges, in Spain, against individuals he saw as responsible for war crimes committed in Guantanamo.

== Disbarment and Reinstatement ==
Diaz was disbarred in Kansas after his release, but is a current member of the New York State Bar. In 2008, Diaz's license to practice law had been suspended. In 2011, Diaz appeared before a 3-member disciplinary panel. After a day-long hearing, the panel recommended a 3-year suspension, retroactive to 2008 and that Diaz should be immediately reinstated to the Kansas Bar. The Kansas Supreme Court rejected the panel's recommendation and instead took the harsher measure of disbarment, claiming he revealed information that could have allowed terrorists to identify Guantanamo staff, and claiming Diaz thus opened Guantanamo staff to a fear of retaliation. Diaz's lawyer, Jack Focht, issued a statement that stated the Kansas Supreme Court, "has a different view of the lawyer's duty to see that the client, even though the client is the United States government, does have a duty to obey the dictates of the United States Supreme Court." Diaz was disbarred on November 21, 2012, and will have to wait seven years before he can request re-instatement in Kansas. However, he was admitted to the New York State Bar on May 2, 2018.
