= Dave Lindorff =

American investigative reporter and filmmaker

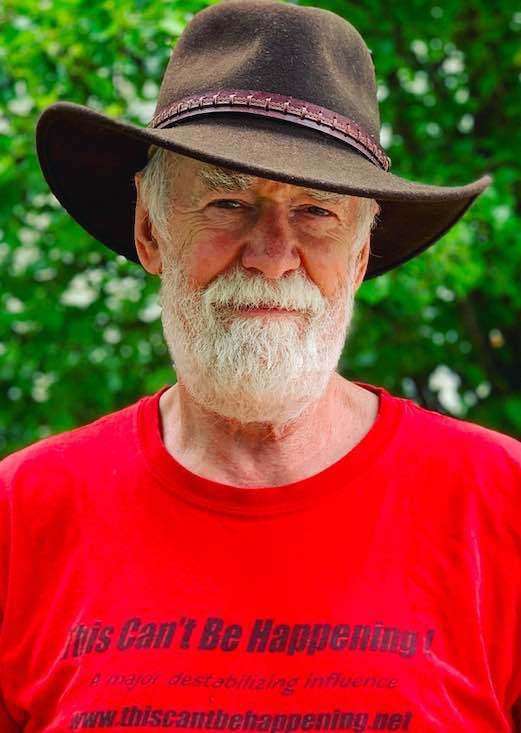
- Dave Lindorff
- Born: 1949 (age 76–77); United States
- Occupations: Writer, journalist, author

Dave Lindorff is an American investigative reporter, filmmaker, a columnist for CounterPunch and a contributor to Tarbell.org, The Nation, FAIR and Salon.com. His work was highlighted by Project Censored 2004, 2011 and 2012.

Born in 1949, Lindorff lives just outside Philadelphia.

== Career ==
Lindorff graduated from Wesleyan University in 1972 with a BA in Chinese language. He then received an MS in Journalism from the Columbia University Graduate School of Journalism in 1975. A two-time Fulbright Scholar (Shanghai, 1991–92 and Taiwan, 2004), he was also a Knight-Bagehot Fellow in Economics and Business Journalism at Columbia University in 1978–79.

In 2019, he was a winner of an "Izzy" for "Outstanding Independent Journalism" awarded by the Park Center for Independent Media. The prize, honored his career work as an investigative journalist and especially his December 2018 Nation magazine cover story, "Exclusive: the Pentagon's Massive Accounting Fraud Exposed," which showed how the Pentagon has been simply making up the numbers in over two decades of annual financial reports submitted to Congress in "support" of ever-higher funding requests for each next year's budget. shttps://theithacan.org/news/park-center-for-independent-media-holds-11th-annual-izzy-awards/

He is also founding editor of the collectively run journalism news site ThisCantBeHappening!, along with six other journalists: John Grant, Jess Guh, Alfredo Lopez, Ron Ridenour, and Linn Washington, Jr., political cartoonist Dave Kiphuft and resident poet Gary Lindorff. The news site, since its founding in June 2010, has won seven Project Censored awards for its coverage (six of them for Lindorff's articles, the other to Washington for his work), and was labeled a "threat" in a memo TCBH! obtained through a FOIA filing with the Department of Homeland Security, which was sent to all U.S. Fusion Centers warning that ThisCantBeHappeing.net had published an article by Lindorff exposing the central role played by DHS in orchestrating the nationwide city-by-city violent police crackdown on the Occupy Movement in late 2011. Lindorff responded by including on the site's home page Masthead the phrase: "The only news organization in the US to be labeled a threat by the Department of Homeland Security".

A former bureau chief covering Los Angeles County government for the Los Angeles Daily News, and a reporter-producer for PBS station KCET in Los Angeles and its Emmy-winning investigative news program "28-Tonight," Lindorff was also a founder and editor of the weekly Los Angeles Vanguard newspaper (as was TCBH member Ridenour), established in 1976, where he won the Grand Prize of the Los Angeles Press Club for his reporting as well as an award for Best Article in a Weekly. Lindorff also worked at the Minneapolis Tribune, the Santa Monica Evening Outlook and The Middletown Press in Connecticut, which was his first professional journalism job.

Lindorff wrote an exposé showing how colleges refuse to provide official/sealed transcripts to former students "late in their payments" or "in default", thereby ensuring those students cannot transfer to another school in the U.S. until the initial school is satisfied with its debt collection. Lindorff has called the practice "extortive".

He is the author of five books, the most recent being Spy for No Country: The Story of Ted Hall, the Teenage Atomic Spy Who May Have Saved the World. His previous books include: The Case for Impeachment: The Legal Argument for Removing President George W. Bush from Office, written with attorney Barbara Olshansky of the Center for Constitutional Rights, as well as Killing Time: An Investigation into the Death Row Case of Mumia Abu-Jamal. That work, published in 2003 by Common Courage Press, was reviewed by Steve Weinberg (the son of a cop) in The Philadelphia Inquirer (a paper that has been no supporter of Mumia Abu-Jamal!) who called it: “The most thorough book yet by an author without direct involvement in the murder case.” Another reviewer, M.A. Foley, wrote in Choice magazine: “The death row case of Mumia Abu-Jamal remains contentious. Lindorff removes much of that contention.... No one can walk away from this book believing that justice has been done, on behalf of either the slain officer or the convicted Abu-Jamal. Summing it up: Highly recommended." Crime magazine wrote: "New favorite: A groundbreaking review of the case involving Mumia Abu-Jamal, while Charles M. Young, in Z-Magazine, wrote: "A relentless and resourceful reporter ... a vast symphony of facts that establishes a number of compelling themes in search of a grand finale compatible with justice."

He is co-producer along with Mark Mitten of A Compassionate Spy, a feature-length documentary film directed by two-time Academy Award-nominee Steve James, about the youngest physicist on the Manhattan Project, 18-year-old Theodore (Ted) Hall, hired at Los Alamos to work on the implosion system for the plutonium bomb used in the Trinity Test on July 16, 1945, and a month later on Nagasaki. The film traces Hall's path from Harvard junior physics major to project scientist and, with the help of a video Hall made a year before his death, at the urging of his British attorney, allows him to explain his reason, nine months after he began working on the bomb project, for volunteering as a Soviet asset at Los Alamos: preventing the US from emerging from World War II with a monopoly on nuclear weapons. As a spy at Los Alamos. Hall, the film shows, gave detailed plans for the plutonium bomb to the Soviets which were critical to Soviet scientists' being able to develop an atom bomb of their own, reportedly a virtual copy of the Nagasaki bomb, by August 29, 1949, something that probably saved the USSR from a planned early-1950s preemptive nuclear blitz with the over 400 atom bombs the US expected to have by that time. The film, which features extensive interviews of Hall's widow Joan, 93 at its first public screening, and their 51 years of marriage with that secret to keep. The film had its premiere at Italy's Venice Film Festival on September 2, 2022, where 1000 viewers filling the Lido Hall rose to applaud for five minutes at its conclusion. The US premiere was a day later at the Telluride Film Festival in Colorado, which offered screenings in four full theaters (two added to accommodate festival-goer demand). Hall is the subject of the book Spy for No Country, written by Lindorff and published by Prometheus Books in November, 2023.

Lindorff has long been active on journalistic issues and was a founder of the National Writers Union in 1983, serving for many years in leadership positions in that union, both as a fledgling national organization, as part of the steering committee of the New Your City local, and years later as part of the steering committee of the Philadelphia local. He was also active in the Hong Kong Journalists Association during his five years in Hong Kong, when he was a correspondent for Business Week magazine.

== Books ==
- Marketplace Medicine: The Rise of the For-Profit Hospital Chains, Bantam, 1992, ISBN 0-553-07552-7
- Killing Time: An Investigation into the Death Penalty Case of Mumia Abu-Jamal, Common Courage, 2003, ISBN 1-56751-229-1
- This Can't Be Happening! Resisting the Disintegration of American Democracy, Common Courage, 2005, ISBN 1-56751-298-4
- The Case for Impeachment: The Legal Argument for Removing President George W. Bush from Office (with Barbara Olshansky), Thomas Dunne, 2006, ISBN 0-312-36016-9
- Spy for No Country: The Story of Ted Hall, the Teenage Atomic Spy Who May Have Saved the World, Prometheus, 2023, ISBN 978-1633888951

== Articles ==
- "Brothers against the Bureau: Ted Hall, the Soviet Union's youngest atomic spy, his rocket scientist brother Ed, and the untold story of how J. Edgar Hoover's biggest Manhattan Project bust was shut down", The Nation, vol. 314, no. 1 (January 10–17, 2022), pp. 26–31.
- "Coastal Landfills are No Match for Rising Seas," The Nation, August 9–16, 2001
- "Exposed: The Pentagon's Massive Accounting Fraud Exposed," The Nation. Cover story on January 7, 2019
