= Rubtsov =

Rubtsov (Russian: Рубцов) is a surname. Notable people with this surname include:

- Alexey Rubtsov (born 1988), a Russian climber
- German Rubtsov (born 1998), a Russian ice hockey player
- Nikolay Rubtsov (1936–1971), a Russian poet
- Pavel Rubtsov (born 1982), a Russian-Spanish journalist
- Sergey Rubtsov (born 1965), a Kazakh shot putter

== See also ==
- 4286 Rubtsov, a minor planet
