= Kidnapping of Emiliano Revilla =

Emiliano Revilla
- Born: 1928 (age 96–97)

Emiliano Revilla is a Spanish industrialist who was kidnapped by the Basque separatist group ETA in 1988. He was captured on February 25, 1988, and freed on October 30, 1988.

From 1960 to 1974 Revilla was the mayor of Ólvega.

The Houston Chronicle reported that Revilla was freed by his captors after a payment of $12 million. They reported that his family had been able to pay his captors, even though the government had announced they would not allow any payments to the kidnappers.

According to the New York Times the release of Revilla within sight of his apartment was very embarrassing for Spanish law enforcement officials and for the Spanish government.

Revilla had inherited his wealth, in the form of a food company, which he expanded. He had also branched into real estate.

During his eight months of captivity Revilla was provided paper, paints, brushes and pencils, for drawing and painting—activities he hadn't pursued since childhood. In 2008 the paintings Revilla had made in 1988 were put on display.

Gonzalo Boye, one of the men convicted of his kidnapping, maintained his innocence, and earned a law degree while in prison.
