= The Guantanamo Trap =

- Directed by: Thomas Wallner
- Release date: April 29, 2011 (Hot Docs Festival)

The Guantanamo Trap is a documentary film about four individuals whose lives were changed by their association with the Guantanamo Bay detention camps. The film was directed by Thomas Wallner and won the special jury prize at the 2011 Hot Docs Canadian International Documentary Festival.

The four individuals profiled in the film are Murat Kurnaz, a Turkish citizen raised in Germany, who was arrested in Pakistan and sold for a bounty to the US army. He spent five years as a detainee in the Kandahar Internment Facility and the Guantanamo camps despite the FBI and the US and German intelligence thought he was innocent. Kurnaz says he is innocent and has been tortured during his detention. Diane Beaver, a military lawyer known for drafting a memo widely described as "the torture memo"; Matthew Diaz, a navy lawyer who was sentenced to 6 month of imprisonment for leaking the names of Guantanamo captives to human rights organizations; Gonzalo Boye, a Spanish lawyer who tried to charge those he thought responsible for war crimes committed at Guantanamo.
