= Barbara Olshansky =

American human rights lawyer

Barbara Olshansky is an American human rights lawyer.

== The Case for Impeachment ==
Olshansky is author with Dave Lindorff of The Case for Impeachment: The Legal Argument for Removing President George W. Bush from Office.

Olshansky and Lindorff include as rationales for impeachment in The Case for Impeachment

...lying and inducing Congress and the American people into an unjust war; allowing his friends and business cronies to profiteer off the war in Iraq; authorizing torture and rendition of prisoners of war and suspected terrorists -- a complete violation of the Geneva Conventions, a treaty the U.S. has signed and is therefore part of our law; stripping American citizens of their Constitutional rights -- holding people with no charge, wiretapping them illegally, offering them no trial, and never allowing them to face their accusers; [and] failing in almost every way possible to defend the homeland and our borders.

== Recipient of Matthew Diaz's leak ==
Olshansky was the recipient of a document leaked by Lieutenant Commander Matthew Diaz, that later led to his court martial, detention, and discharge. The efforts of the Center for Constitutional Rights were impaired by the Bush administration's policy of withholding the captives' identities. Diaz had met Olshansky during a visit to Guantanamo, and he sent her a list in an unmarked greeting card. The list provided by Diaz contained the names of 550 captives.

Olshansky suspected the list might have been classified, so she contacted Federal authorities.

== Director of the International Justice Network ==
After leaving the Center for Constitutional Rights Olshansky was hired as director of the International Justice Network.

== Academia ==
In 2007 Olshanksy was appointed the Leah Kaplan Visiting Professor in Human Rights at Stanford University's Law School.

In Spring 2010, Olshansky joined the faculty at the University of Maryland School of Law. She will be teaching the International Clinic.
