= Thomas Wallner =

German/Canadian filmmaker

Thomas Selim Wallner
- Occupation: filmmaker/producer/game designer

Thomas Selim Wallner is a German/Canadian filmmaker.

Wallner was a co-founder of Xenophile Media in 2001. He has worked with Rhombus Media since 1995. Thomas Wallner is a producer, writer, director and game designer working in feature film, television, games and interactive media. In addition to producing innovative cross-media properties for television, he has written and directed eight award-winning feature documentaries that have been broadcast in more than 30 countries.

A leading figure in the creation of participatory narratives he brought the underground genre of Alternate Reality Gaming into the Television mainstream, culminating in Xenophile Media's Emmy Award-winning Fallen and Regenesis.

In 2007 Wallner developed the story concept for Late Fragment, Canada's first interactive feature drama produced by the NFB and the Canadian Film Centre.

Thomas is a recipient of numerous honours including two Emmy Awards with a total of five nominations, three Geminis, a Rose d’Or, two SXSW Interactive Awards, two Webbys and two CNMA's.

He was nominated for Interactive Producer of the Year at the 2011 CNMA awards.

His documentary, The Guantanamo Trap won the Special Jury Prize at the 2011 Hot Docs film festival.

Wallner described being put on the "no-fly list" in 2005, after declining to submit to an iris-scan when he tried to travel to the USA. He stated this was his inspiration for The Guantanamo Trap.

== Selected filmography ==
- Before the Last Curtain Falls (2014) – writer, director The feature documentary captures the moving story of a group of ageing drag queens and transsexual artists who set out one last time to live the glamorous life of the famous.
- The Guantanamo Trap (2011) - Writer, Director – Theatrical Feature Documentary (Swiss, German, Canadian co-production) that tells stories from the U.S. detention camp, not only from the perspective of the captives, but also the captors. Hot Docs World Premiere. 2011 Hot Docs special Jury Prize. 2011 Cinefest NFB best Canadian Feature Doc Award.
- Inside Hana's Suitcase (2009) -Writer - Theatrical Feature Documentary about Hana Brady who was a young girl murdered in Auschwitz.
- Late Fragment (2007) – Story Concept - North America's first dramatic interactive feature film, a product of the Canadian Film Center and the NFB, lets the audience piece together and experience the cinematic narrative in a number of ways. Late Fragment retains the focus on complex character-driven stories surrounding the impact of violent crime on their lives.
- Tropicana (2006) - Writer, Director - The only film allowed to go behind the scenes at the famous Cabaret since the Cuban revolution.
- Mozartballs (2005) – writer - A tribute to Mozart featuring curious personalities that embody the spirit of the composer – from Swiss schoolteacher obsessed by all things Mozart, to an ex-pop musician in Oklahoma who believes that her body is inhabited by Mozart's spirit.
- Beethoven's Hair (2004) – writer – A feature documentary based on the best-selling book that tells the story of a lock of hair cut from the head of Ludwig van Beethoven and its journey through time. Thomas received a Gemini Award for Best Writing of a Documentary Program or Series.
- Solidarity Song-The Hanns Eisler Story (1996) – Co-Director, Co-Writer - A feature documentary on the German Communist composer. The film premiered at the Louvre in Paris, where it won the Image en classique award, given to the best arts film in the world over a three-year period. Thomas received two Gemini nominations for Best Writing and Best Directing of a Documentary Program or Series.
- My War Years: Arnold Schoenberg (1992) – Associate Director and Co-WriterA portrait of the composer. The film received a Gemini Award for Best Performing Arts Documentary, and Thomas was nominated for a Gemini Award for Best Writing of a Documentary Program or Series.
