= Before the Last Curtain Falls =

- French: Alphée des étoiles
- Directed by: Thomas Wallner
- Written by: Thomas Wallner; Eva Küpper
- Produced by: Kerstin Meyer-Beetz
- Cinematography: Axel Schneppat
- Edited by: Manfred Becker
- Production company: Gebrueder Beetz Filmproduktion
- Distributed by: Real Fiction
- Release date: April 28, 2014 (Hot Docs)
- Running time: 92 minutes
- Countries: Belgium; Canada; Germany
- Languages: Flemish; French; English; Mandarin

Before the Last Curtain Falls (German: Bevor der letzte Vorhang fällt) is a documentary film, directed by Thomas Wallner and released in 2014. The film centres on a group of drag and transgender cabaret entertainers who undertook the international Gardenia tour in the early 2010s as their final project before retiring, as they prepare for the tour's final show in Ghent.

Performers appearing in the film are Gerrit Becker, Richard Dierick, Vanessa Van Durme, Andrea De Laet, Danilo Povolo, Rudy Suwyns, Griet De Backer, Hendrik Lebon, Dirk Van Vaerenbergh, Yong Li and Ashref Mahmoud.

The film premiered at the 2014 Hot Docs Canadian International Documentary Festival, where it received a Special Jury Prize from the Best Canadian Feature Documentary jury.
