= Theodore Hall =

American physicist and spy (1925–1999)

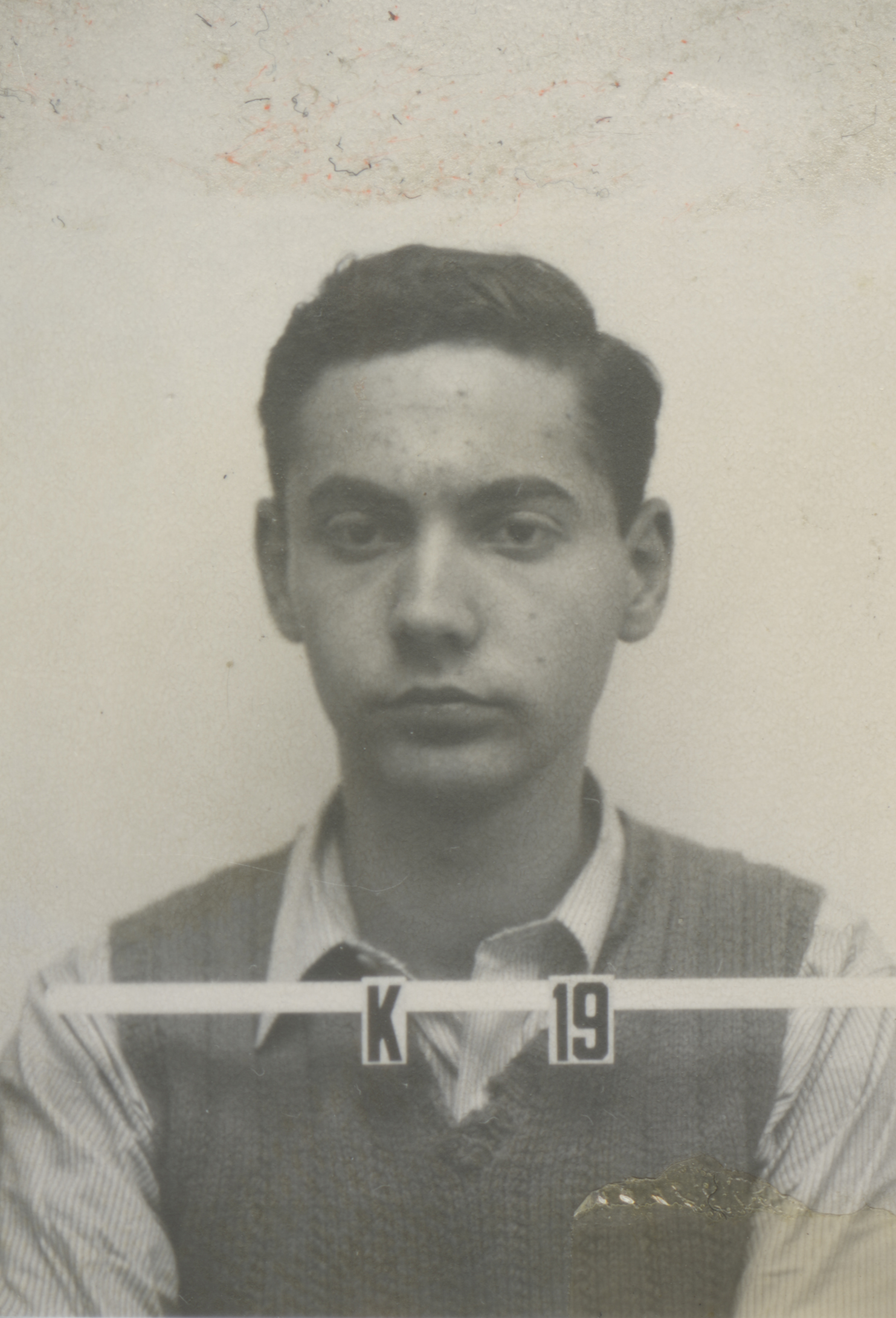
- Hall's ID badge photo from Los Alamos
- Born: Theodore Alvin Holtzberg; October 20, 1925; New York City, New York, U.S.
- Died: November 1, 1999 (aged 74); Cambridge, England, UK
- Education: Queens College; Harvard University (BS); University of Chicago (MS)
- Occupation: Physicist
- Employer: Manhattan Project
- Known for: Atomic espionage
- Relatives: Edward N. Hall (brother)

Theodore Alvin Hall (October 20, 1925 – November 1, 1999) was an American physicist and an atomic spy for the Soviet Union, who, during his work on United States efforts to develop the first and second atomic bombs during World War II (the Manhattan Project), gave a detailed description of the "Fat Man" plutonium bomb, and of several processes for purifying plutonium, to Soviet intelligence.

His brother, Edward N. Hall, was a rocket scientist who led the U.S. Air Force's program to develop an intercontinental ballistic missile, personally designing the Minuteman missile and convincing the Pentagon and President Eisenhower to adopt it as a key part of the nation's strategic nuclear triad.

== Early life and education ==
Theodore Alvin Holtzberg was born in Far Rockaway, New York City, to a devout Jewish couple, Barnett Holtzberg and Rose Moskowitz. His father was a furrier who had emigrated to the United States to escape antisemitic pogroms in the Russian Empire. His mother was the American-born daughter of Eastern European Jewish immigrants. She died while Theodore was a teenager and a student at Harvard University.

The Great Depression hurt Barnett's business significantly; when it was no longer able to support the household, the family moved to Washington Heights in Upper Manhattan. In the fall of 1936, despite the protests of their parents, Edward, his brother, legally changed both his and Theodore's last name to Hall in an effort to avoid antisemitic hiring practices he was experiencing that were prevalent at the time.

Even at a young age, Theodore showed an impressive aptitude for mathematics and science, mostly being tutored by his elder brother Edward, who was 11 years his senior. After skipping three grades at Public School 173 in Washington Heights, in the fall of 1937, Hall entered the Townsend Harris High School for gifted boys. He attended the 1939 New York World's Fair and was deeply impressed by the Soviet pavilion and a copy of the Mayakovskaya Metro station. After graduation from high school, he was accepted into Queens College at the age of 14 in 1940, and transferred to Harvard University in 1942 as junior physics major, where he graduated at the age of 18 in 1944.

== Manhattan Project ==
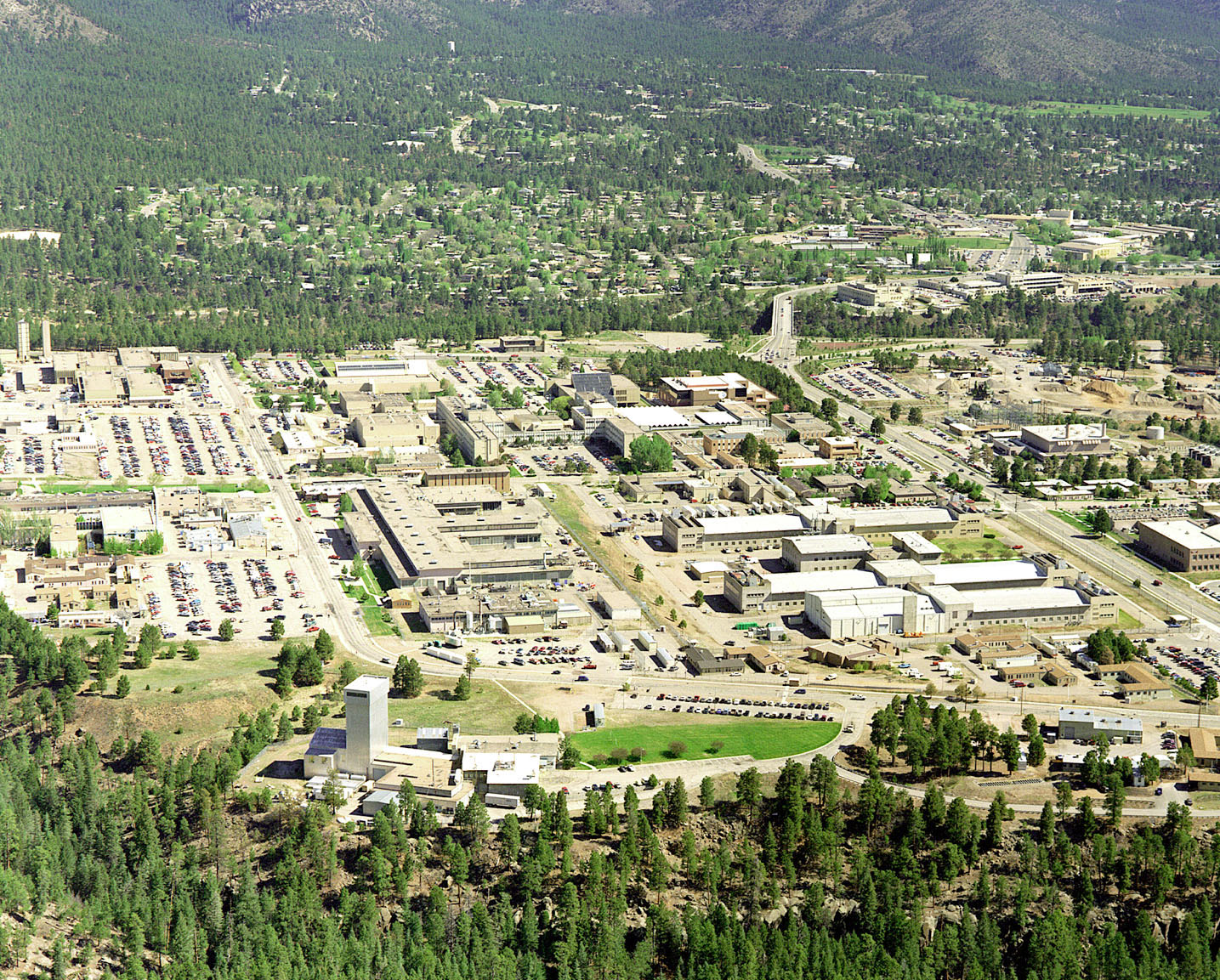
Modern-day Los Alamos aerial view

Basic design of an implosion-type atomic bomb

At the age of 18, on the recommendation of Prof. John Van Vleck, Hall was hired as the youngest physicist to be recruited to work on the Manhattan Project at Los Alamos. At Los Alamos, after first helping to determine the critical mass of uranium used for "Little Boy", Hall was assigned to conduct experiments on and tests of the implosion system ("Fat Man"). He was eventually, while still a teen, put in charge of a team working on that difficult task.

Hall later claimed that as it became clear in the summer of 1944 that Nazi Germany was losing the war and would never manage to develop an atomic bomb, he became concerned about the consequences of an American monopoly on atomic weapons once the war ended. He was especially worried about the possibility of the emergence of a fascist government in the United States, should it have such a nuclear monopoly and want to keep it that way. He was not alone. It was widely known inside the confines of Los Alamos, that Lieutenant General Leslie Groves, director of the Manhattan Project, had revealed to a group of top physicists there at a dinner that the real target of the US atom bomb was the Soviet Union, a shocking statement that led one top physicist, Josef Rotblat, to resign from the Project, and others like Niels Bohr and Leo Szilard to vainly petition first Roosevelt, and later Truman to halt it, not use it on people in Japan, or to inform the Stalin regime about it.

On the pretext of returning to his home in New York City for his 19th birthday in October 1944, Ted Hall visited the headquarters of Amtorg, the Soviet Union trading company located in a loft building on 24th Street in Midtown Manhattan. There an American worker for Amtorg gave him the name and address of Sergey Kurnakov, a military writer for Soviet Russia Today and Russky Golos—the same contact that was also recommended to his Harvard friend, roommate and eventually initial spy courier Saville Sax, by the head of a Soviet Cultural center in New York, Artkino.

Unaware initially that Kurnakov was an NKVD agent, Hall handed him a report on the scientists who worked at Los Alamos, the conditions at Los Alamos, and the basic science behind the bomb. Saville Sax subsequently delivered the same report to the Soviet Consulate, which he visited under the guise of inquiring about relatives still in the Soviet Union. The two eventually met with Anatoly Yatskov, the New York station chief operating under the cover of being a Consular clerk, who two weeks later transmitted the information about both young men to NKVD headquarters in Moscow using a one-time pad cipher.

After officially becoming an informant for the Soviet Union, Hall was given the code-name MLAD, a Slavic root meaning "young", and Sax, who was almost a year older than Hall, was given the code-name STAR, a Slavic root meaning "old".

Kurnakov reported in November 1944:

Rather tall, slender, brown-haired, pale and a bit pimply-faced, dressed carelessly, boots appear not cleaned for a long time, slipped socks. His hair is parted and often falls on his forehead. His English is highly cultured and rich. He answers quickly and very fluently, especially to scientific questions. Eyes are set closely together; evidently, neurasthenic. Perhaps because of premature mental development, he is witty and somewhat sarcastic but without a shadow of undue familiarity and cynicism. His main trait — a highly sensitive brain and quick responsiveness. In conversation, he is sharp and flexible as a sword ... He comes from a Jewish family, though doesn't look like a Jew. His father is a furrier; his mother is dead ... He is not in the army because, until now, young physicists in government jobs at a military installation were not being drafted. Now, he is to be drafted but has no doubts that he will be kept at the same place, only dressed in a military uniform and with a correspondingly lower salary.

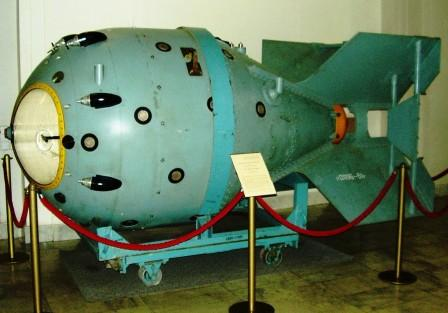
RDS-1

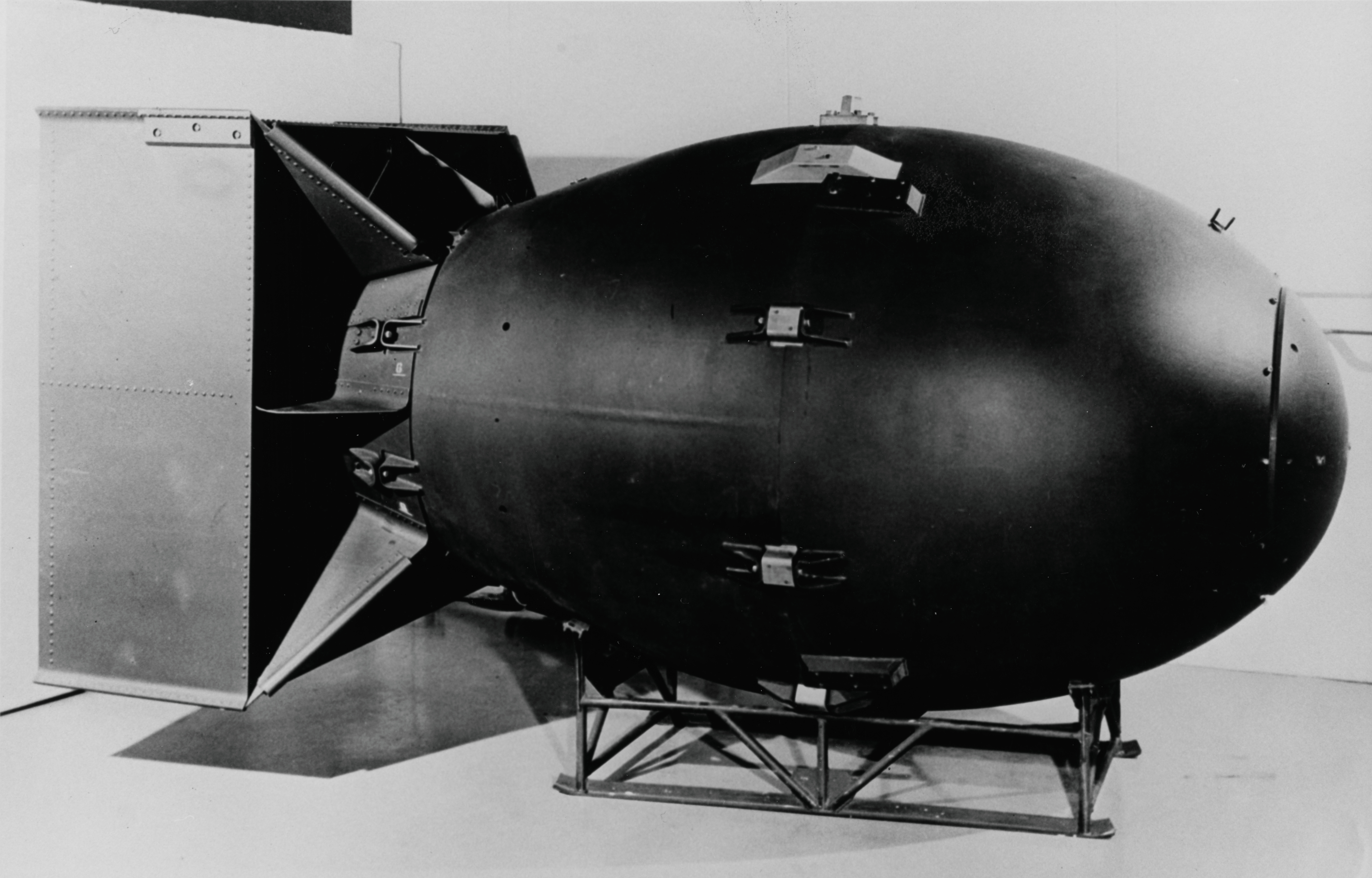
"Fat Man"

Espionage information procured by Klaus Fuchs and Theodore Hall, and to a lesser extent by David Greenglass, led to the first Soviet device, "RDS-1", closely resembling Fat Man, even in its external shape.

Unbeknownst to Hall, Klaus Fuchs, a Los Alamos colleague, and others still unidentified, were also spying for the Soviet Union; none seems to have known of the others. Sax acted as Hall's courier until spring of 1945 when, because he was returning to full-time student status at Harvard University, he was replaced by Lona Cohen. Igor Kurchatov, a scientist and the head of the Soviet atomic bomb effort, probably used information provided by Klaus Fuchs to confirm corresponding information provided earlier by Hall. Despite other scientists giving information to the Soviet Union, Hall was the only known scientist to give details on the design of an atomic bomb until later revelations of the role of Oscar Seborer.

== Career after Los Alamos ==
In June 1946, Hall's security clearance was revoked by the US Army, not over suspicions of being a Soviet asset but because of discovery of a letter he had received from his British sister-in-law, his brother Edward's wife Edith, who inquired jokingly of him: "I hear you're working on something that goes up with a big bang! Can you send us one of them for Guy Fawkes Day?" as well as left-wing publications he had been receiving at Los Alamos over the prior year that overworked censors had apparently overlooked at the time. Furloughed out of the military with an honorable discharge and a citation from President Truman for the achievements of the Army's Special Engineering Detachment at Los Alamos, Hall headed that fall for the University of Chicago, where he finished his master's and doctoral degrees in physics, met his wife, and started a family. After graduating he became a biophysicist.

In Chicago, as a graduate student research assistant he pioneered important techniques in X-ray microanalysis. In 1952, he left the University of Chicago's Institute for Radiobiology and Biophysics to take a research position in biophysics at Memorial Sloan-Kettering in New York City. In 1962, he became unsatisfied with his equipment and the techniques available to him. He then moved to Vernon Ellis Cosslett's electron microscopy research laboratory at Cambridge University in England. At Cambridge he created the Hall Method of continuum normalization, developed for the specific purpose of analyzing thin sections of biological tissue. He remained working at Cambridge until he retired at the age of 59 in 1984.

Hall later became active in obtaining signatures for the Stockholm Peace Pledge.

== Death ==
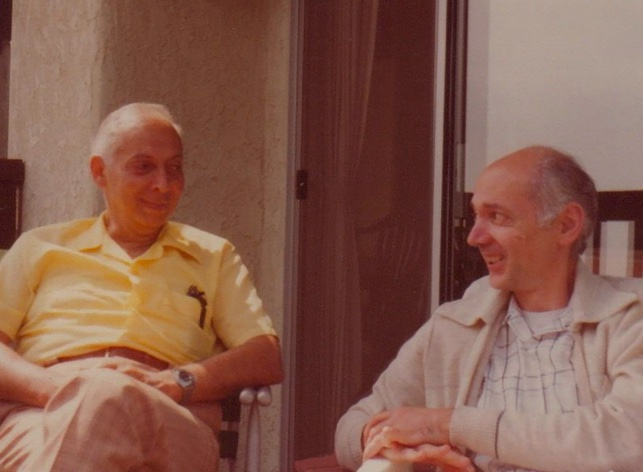
Brothers Edward (L) and Ted Hall at the Ed Hall residence in Palos Verdes, California circa 1980s (Hall family photo)

On November 1, 1999, Theodore Hall died at the age of 74, in Cambridge, England. He was survived by his wife and three daughters. Although he had suffered from Parkinson's disease, he ultimately succumbed to renal cancer, likely acquired as a result of the experimental work he was doing with plutonium in his year working on the "Gadget" used for the Trinity test.

== FBI investigation ==
The US Army's Signal Intelligence Service Venona project, decrypted some Soviet messages and in January 1950 uncovered one cable identifying Hall and Sax by name as Soviet spies (albeit misspelled as Teodor Kholl and Savil Sachs), but until the document's public release along with many other pages of Soviet wartime spy cables in July 1995, nearly all of the espionage regarding the Los Alamos nuclear weapons program was attributed to Klaus Fuchs. Hall was questioned by the FBI in March 1951 but was not charged. The FBI and US Justice Department claimed this was because their only evidence was the Venona document and that the US did not want to let the Soviets know they had broken their elaborate and supposedly "unbreakable" code. Alan H. Belmont, the number-three man in the FBI, claimed he decided at that time that information coming out of the Venona project would be inadmissible in court as hearsay evidence, so its value in the case was not worth compromising the program.

Journalist Dave Lindorff, writing in The Nation on January 4, 2022, obtained through the Freedom of Information Act, Hall's FBI file in 2021. This 130-page file included communications between FBI Director J. Edgar Hoover to the head of the Air Force Office of Special Investigations, Gen. Joseph F. Carroll, showing that Carroll had effectively blocked Hoover's intended pursuit of Hall and Sax, probably fearing that Hall's arrest would have, in the political climate of the McCarthy Era, forced the US Air Force to furlough and lose their top missile expert, Edward Hall. Carroll, a former top aide to Hoover before he became the first head of the USAF OSI, ultimately allowed Hoover's agents to question Ed Hall on June 12, 1951 (with an OSI officer monitoring the interview). Within several weeks of that session, the Air Force, which had conducted and completed its own investigation into Edward Hall's loyalty (having their own investigators question him four times), promoted him to Lt. Colonel, and later Colonel, and elevated him from assistant director to director of its missile development program. The promotions were a clear slap in the face to Hoover. Ed Hall went on to complete the development of the Minuteman missile program, and then retired. In 1999, seven years before his death, the Air Force honored him by adding him to the Air Force Aerospace Hall of Fame.

Lindorff co-produced the 2022 documentary film A Compassionate Spy based on Hall's life and spying. In 2023, Lindorff published the book Spy for No Country: The Story of Ted Hall, the Teenage Atomic Spy Who May Have Saved the World.

=== Statements in 1990s ===
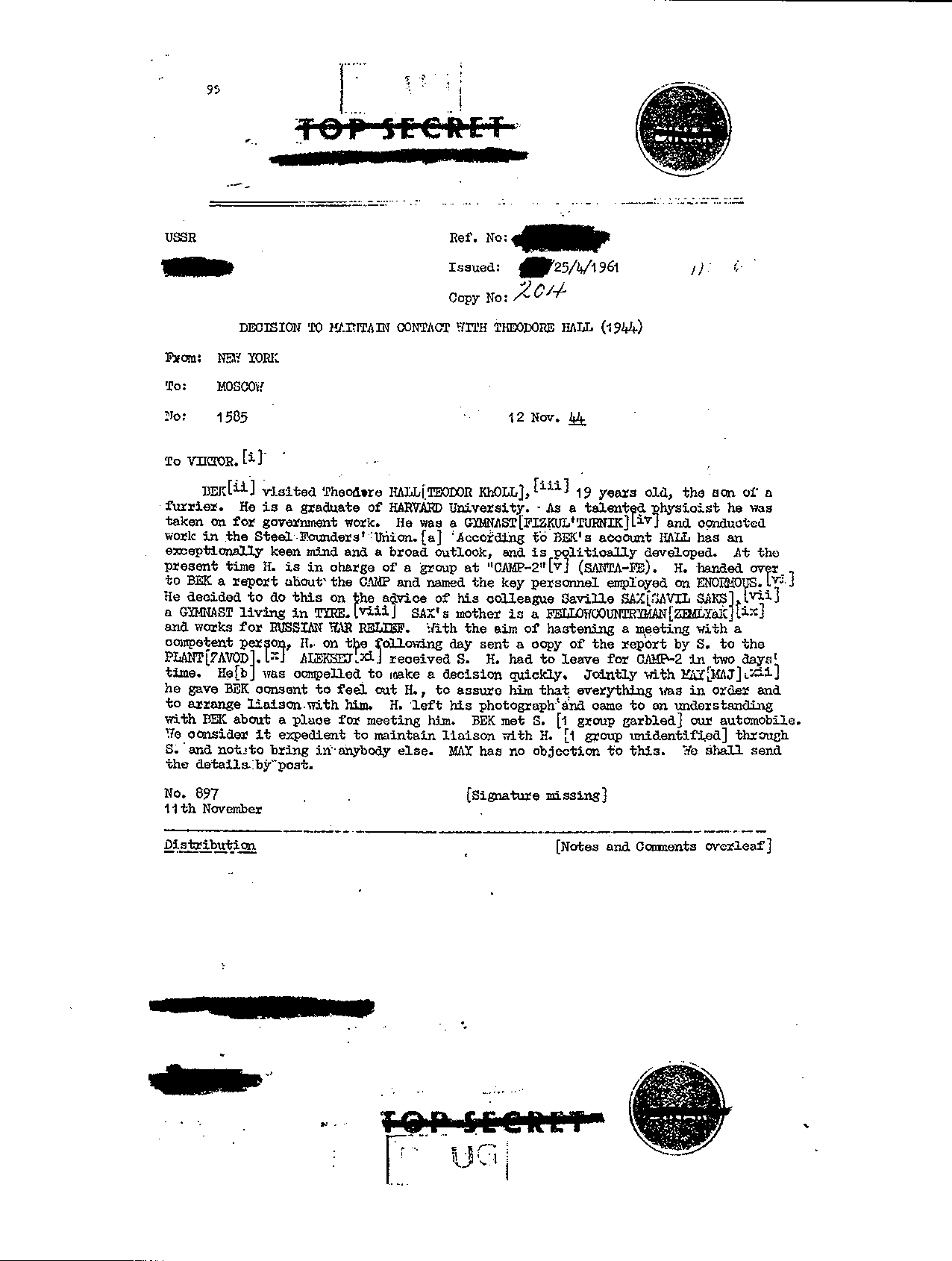
Report on recruiting of Theodore Hall from the Venona project

The Venona project became public knowledge in July 1995.

In a written statement published in 1997, Hall came very close to admitting that the Soviet spy cable identifying him as a Soviet asset was accurate, although obliquely, saying that in the immediate postwar years, he felt strongly that "an American monopoly" on nuclear weapons "was dangerous and should be avoided":

To help prevent that monopoly I contemplated a brief encounter with a Soviet agent, just to inform them of the existence of the A-bomb project. I anticipated a very limited contact. With any luck, it might easily have turned out that way, but it was not to be.

A year before his death, he gave a more direct confession in an interview for the TV-series Cold War on CNN in 1998, saying:

I decided to give atomic secrets to the Russians because it seemed to me that it was important that there should be no monopoly, which could turn one nation into a menace and turn it loose on the world as ... Nazi Germany developed. There seemed to be only one answer to what one should do. The right thing to do was to act to break the American monopoly.

== List of publications ==
- Steveninck, Reinhard; Steveninck, Margaret; Hall, Theodore; Peters, Patricia (1974). "A chlorine-free embedding medium for use in X-ray analytical electron microscope localisation of chloride in biological tissues". Histochemistry. 38 (2): 173–180. doi:10.1007/BF00499664. PMID 4205647. S2CID 2866621.
- Normann, Tom; Hall, Theodore (1978). "Calcium and sulphur in neurosecretory granules and calcium in mitochondria as determined by electron microscope X-ray microanalysis". Cell and Tissue Research. 186 (3): 453–463. doi:10.1007/BF00224934. PMID 627026. S2CID 19456444.
- Civan, Mortimer; Hall, Theodore; Gupta, Brij (1980). "Microprobe study of toad urinary bladder in absence of serosal K+". The Journal of Membrane Biology. 55 (3): 187–202. doi:10.1007/BF01869460. PMID 6774097. S2CID 23781565.
- Dow, Julian, Gupta, Brij, & Hall, Theodore (1981). Microprobe analysis of Na, K, Cl, P, S, Ca, Mg and H_{2}O in frozen-hydrated sections of anterior caeca of the locust, Schistocerca gregaria. Journal of Insect Physiology, 27(9), 629-639. doi: 10.1016/0022-1910(81)90111-6
- Dow, Julian; Gupta, Brij; Hall, Theodore; Harvey, William (1984). "X-ray microanalysis of elements in frozen-hydrated sections of an electrogenic K + transport system: The posterior midgut of tobacco hornworm (Manduca sexta) in vivo and in vitro". The Journal of Membrane Biology. 77 (3): 223–241. doi:10.1007/BF01870571. PMID 6699905. S2CID 24753487.

== See also ==
- Klaus Fuchs
- Oscar Seborer
- Saville Sax
- Lona Cohen
- Morris Cohen (spy)
- Manhattan Project
- Los Alamos
- J. Robert Oppenheimer
- Oppenheimer security hearing
- Atomic spies
- Soviet espionage in the United States
- Nuclear espionage
