= Diane E. Beaver =

American lawyer

- Education: Indiana University Bloomington, 1979; Washington University in St. Louis, 1987
- Military career
- Branch: Army
- Rank: Lieutenant Colonel
- Unit: United States Army Judge Advocate General's Corps
- Known for: Drafting legal opinions advocating for enhanced interrogation techniques
- Other work: United States Department of Defense

Diane E. Beaver is an American lawyer and former officer in the United States Army. In 2001, she was Chief of the Eastern U.S. Torts Branch of the U.S. Army Claims Service. By 2002, she was deployed to the Guantanamo Bay detention camp as a lawyer in the U.S. military prison complex there. As of 2016, she is currently practicing commercial litigation for the Bryan Cave law firm in St. Louis, Missouri.

== Guantánamo experience ==
Department of Defense memorandum with the subject "Legal Review of Aggressive Interrogation Techniques", signed by Beaver.

In October 2002, when Beaver worked for the United States Army Judge Advocate General's Corps, she drafted a legal opinion advocating for the legality of harsh interrogation techniques that were being proposed for use at Guantanamo, including

- waterboarding;
- exposure to extremes of temperature;
- the use of non-injurious physical contact; and
- "scenarios designed to convince the detainee that death or severely painful consequences are imminent for him and/or his family."

She also advised that Category II and III methods (the harshest) "undergo a legal review prior to their commencement".

In a meeting in October 2002, Beaver warned her fellow officers to make sure that observers from the International Committee of the Red Cross (ICRC) not observe the use of the "harsher" interrogation techniques.

The JTF "might need to curb the harsher operations while [ICRC] is around". It would be "better not to expose them to any controversial techniques. . . They will be in and out, scrutinizing our operations, unless they are displeased and decide to protest and leave. This would draw a lot of negative attention."

After leaving the Army Beaver was hired by the United States Department of Defense.

Beaver testified before the Senate Armed Services Committee on June 17, 2008. The final paragraph of the written statement she submitted to the committee read:

If my legal opinion was wrong, then I regret the error very much. I am a proud professional. I feel very keenly any failure on my part to be precise and accurate in the advice I render. I freely accept sincere dissent and criticism. But there is something very important I will never have to regret. At a time of great stress and danger, I tried to do everything in my lawful power to protect the American people.

She retired from the army as a lieutenant colonel.

Beaver was one of the four individuals profiled in the 2009 documentary The Guantanamo Trap.

== Education ==
- Washington University in St. Louis, J.D., 1987
- Indiana University Bloomington, B.A., 1979
