= Gonzalo Boye =

Chilean convicted lawyer in Spain

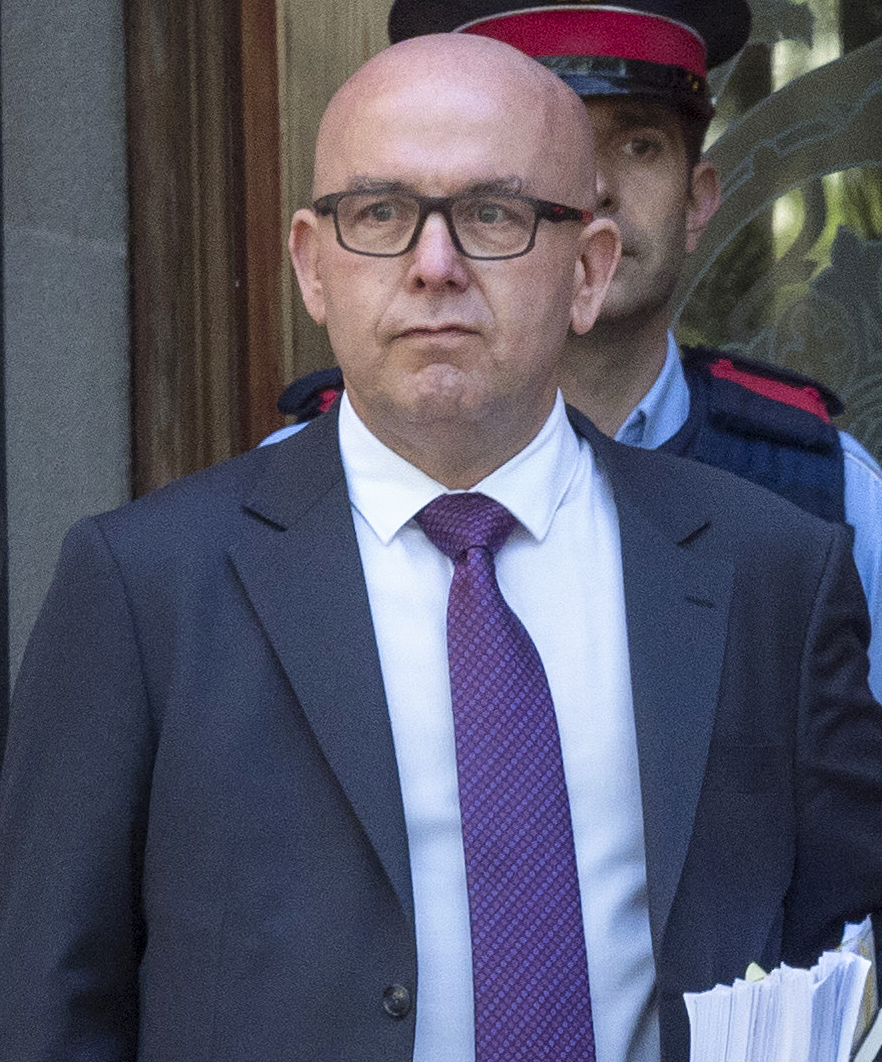
- Born: 3 April 1965 (age 60); Viña del Mar, Chile
- Occupation: Lawyer

Gonzalo Boye Tuset (born 3 April 1965) is a lawyer based in Spain, known for being convicted in connection with a kidnapping by Basque separatist group ETA in 1996, and for attempting to charge members of the George W. Bush administration officials for war crimes committed against Spanish citizens. In recent years, he has often been in the media spotlight as lawyer of former Catalan President Carles Puigdemont, who he successfully defended against extradition from several EU countries to Spain.

== Biography ==
Boye was born in Viña del Mar (Chile) on 3 April 1965. His father developed anti-pinochetista stances while his mother (of Catalan descent) turned to support Pinochet instead. Boye has dual German and Chilean citizenship. He took his basic education at The Mackay School, an elite school in Valparaíso.

He lived for a while in Heidelberg (Germany), where he studied Economics and Political Science, failing to graduate. He reportedly moved to Spain by the late 1980s.

Allegedly a member of the Movimiento de Izquierda Revolucionaria (MIR), Boye was detained in 1992 by the Policía Nacional, accused of participating in the kidnappings of Diego Prado y Colón de Carvajal in 1983 and Emiliano Revilla in 1988. He was cleared from the first kidnapping.

In 1996 the Audiencia Nacional sentenced Boye to 14 years in prison for collaborating with Basque separatist group ETA, after the Court considered proven that Boye played a key role in the kidnapping of the businessman Revilla, that lasted for eight months. The victim was released after a large ransom payment.

Boye began to study law while he was convicted, earning a licentiate degree in Law from the Universidad Nacional de Educación a Distancia (UNED) in 2002, the year in which he was released.

Many nations allow war crime charges to be laid against non-citizens, and non-residents, when the countries where they lived when the war crimes were committed has failed to initiate an effective inquiry. Spain has a tradition of being more aggressive than other nations, famously trying to extradite Chilean leader Augusto Pinochet from Britain. In 2009 Boye tried to initiate extradition of six former officials from the Presidency of George W. Bush.

Boye was one of four individuals profiled in the award-winning documentary The Guantanamo trap. The movie challenges whether Boye was fairly convicted for the kidnapping. According to Deutsche Welle Boye was "a victim of police torture himself". However, Boye was convicted and sentenced to 14 years imprisonment. After 6 years in prison he was set free.

Boye has been the lawyer for Pablo González Yagüe, a Russian-Spanish journalist arrested by the Polish authorities in February 2022 as a Russian agent and held without trial until a multinational exchange of prisoners with Russia in August 2024.
