= A Compassionate Spy =

2022 film by Steve James

- Film poster
- Directed by: Steve James
- Written by: Steve James
- Produced by: Mark Mitten; Dave Lindorff; Steve James
- Cinematography: Tom Bergmann
- Edited by: Steve James
- Production companies: Participant Media; Mitten Media; Kartemquin Films
- Distributed by: Magnolia Pictures (United States)
- Release dates: September 2, 2022 (Venice Film Festival); August 4, 2023 (United States)
- Country: United States
- Box office: $34,502

A Compassionate Spy is a 2022 American documentary film written and directed by Steve James. It premiered out of competition at the 79th edition of the Venice Film Festival. The film was released in the United States on August 4, 2023.

== Premise ==
Through a long interview with the subject and his wife, archive footage and some dramatic reenactments, the film tells the story of Manhattan Project physicist and Soviet Union spy Theodore Hall.

== Release ==
The film had its world premiere at the premiered out of competition at the 79th Venice International Film Festival on September 2, 2022. It was later screened at various festivals including the Telluride Film Festival, the Chicago International Film Festival, and the Palm Springs International Film Festival. The film was theatrically released in the United States by Magnolia Pictures on August 4, 2023.

== Reception ==
On the review aggregator website Rotten Tomatoes, 81% of 48 critics' reviews are positive, with an average rating of 7/10. The website's consensus reads: "A Compassionate Spy's personal approach to its real-life story makes the end result mostly compelling despite an uncritical tone that verges on hagiography." Metacritic, which uses a weighted average, assigned the film a score of 72 out of 100, based on 20 critics, indicating "generally favorable" reviews.

The reenactments were criticized by Guy Lodge from Variety, who described them as "unnecessary", making the film "more televisual than in James's best work". David Ehrlich from IndieWire wrote that the reenactments were a "miscalculation that keeps [the film] at arm’s length."
