= Edward N. Hall =

American engineer (1914–2006)

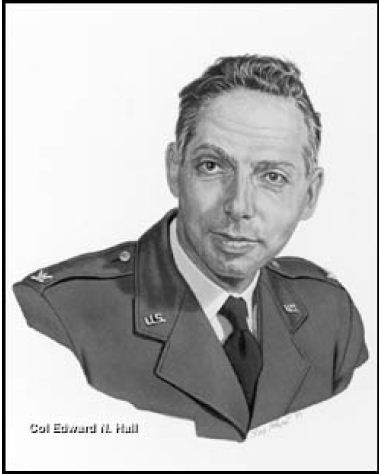
- 1989 drawing of Hall
- Born: Edward Nathaniel Holtzberg; 4 August 1914; New York City, U.S.
- Died: 15 January 2006 (aged 91); Torrance, California, U.S.
- Relatives: Theodore Hall (brother)
- Military career
- Branch: United States Army (1939–1947); United States Air Force (1947–1959)
- Service years: 1939–1959
- Rank: Colonel
- Conflicts: World War II; Combined Bomber Offensive
- Awards: Bronze Star Medal; Legion of Merit (2)

Edward Nathaniel Hall (4 August 1914 – 15 January 2006) was a leading missile development engineer working for the United States and its allies in World War II and the late 20th century. He is known as the father of the Minuteman intercontinental ballistic missile.

A graduate of the College of the City of New York, Hall enlisted in the United States Army Air Corps in September 1939. During World War II he served in Britain where he was awarded the Legion of Merit for the repair of battle-damaged Boeing B-17 Flying Fortress and Consolidated B-24 Liberator bombers. After the war ended he was assigned to the Wright Air Development Center (WADC), a top secret research lab where he collated reports on the German V-2 rocket and participated in the development of solid and liquid rocket power plants, working with Rocketdyne to develop more powerful rocket engines.

In August 1954 Hall joined the Western Development Division as the chief of Propulsion Development, and directed the development of engines for the Atlas, Titan and Thor missiles. In 1957 he was the director of the Thor development program and supervised the installation of Thor missiles in the UK. He also headed the Minuteman project, and then went to Europe, where, at the urging of the Pentagon, he started the French Diamant missile project, a nuclear warhead-carrying IRBM which was central to French President Charles de Gaulle’s desire for France to have an independent nuclear force separate from the US and NATO.

== Early life ==
Edward Nathaniel Holtzberg was born on 4 August 1914 in Forest Hills, Queens, New York City, the son of Rose Moskowitz and Barnett Holtzberg, a furrier. His family was Jewish. He had a younger brother, Theodore (Ted), who became an accomplished physicist. Ted worked for the Manhattan Project and became an atomic spy, passing nuclear secrets to the Soviet Union. The family company his father worked for, J. Holtzberg and Sons, went broke during the Great Depression and the banks foreclosed, but Edward gained admission to Townsend Harris Hall Prep School by passing a competitive examination. He earned a Bachelor of Science degree from the College of the City of New York, where education was free, in 1935 and a professional degree in chemical engineering the following year.

Jobs for chemical engineers were hard to find during the Great Depression years, and despite having two degrees, he was unable to find work. He suspected that this was due to then-prevalent antisemitism in the United States, and in 1936 he and his brother Ted, then 11, legally changed their surname to "Hall". He still had trouble finding work as a chemical engineer, and for a time worked as an auto mechanic, a steamfitter, a plumber, an electrician and a radio repairman.

== World War II ==
Hall enlisted in the United States Army Air Corps on 26 September 1939; the Air Corps was not yet commissioning engineers as officers. He attended the school for airplane mechanics at Chanute Field near Chicago. After graduating, he was posted to March Field in California, and then to Elmendorf Field in Alaska, where his skill at repairing aircraft and fixing the mistakes of others earned him a promotion to sergeant. In 1941, the Air Corps put out a call for enlisted men with appropriate qualifications to apply for commissions. Hall immediately did so, and he was commissioned as a second lieutenant soon after the Japanese bombing of Pearl Harbor that brought the United States into World War II.

In late 1942, Hall was sent to Britain. Soon after he arrived, he met Edith Shawcross, a niece of the English barrister and politician Hartley Shawcross and a graduate of St Hilda's College, Oxford, where she earned an honors degree in botany. They were married in June 1943, and had two sons, David and Jonathan, and a daughter, Sheila.

Hall became the officer in charge of the repair of battle-damaged Boeing B-17 Flying Fortress and Consolidated B-24 Liberator bombers aircraft at Base Air Depot 2 at Warton Aerodrome. He received the Legion of Merit for devising a new method of airplane spar repair that saved several days by eliminating the stripping of the skin from the wings to replace the spar. Plates that spanned the fractured spar were connected with oversized pins, forced through holes drilled through the plate/spar overlap using extreme hydraulic pressure. The award of the Legion of Merit was very unusual for a first lieutenant. He was promoted to captain in October 1943 and major on 1 June 1945.

Hall's introduction to missiles came near the war's end when he was assigned to acquire intelligence on Germany's wartime propulsion work. He was awarded the Bronze Star for this work, which began in conquered territory within Germany before the war had ended, and ended with his joining a special forces Army team at Peenemunde and Nordhausen in the eastern zone of Germany officially occupied by the Soviet Red Army.

== Missile development work ==
Hall returned to the United States with his family in 1946, and was assigned to the Wright Air Development Center (WADC) at Wright Field in Ohio. He hoped that his assignment would be to work on the development of rocket engines, but instead he became the chief propulsion officer in the Technical Intelligence Department, collating reports on the German V-2 rocket. He joined the United States Air Force (USAF) on its formation in September 1947, and soon after he moved to Pasadena, California, where he earned a Master of Science degree in aeronautical engineering from the California Institute of Technology in 1948. The Technical Intelligence Department then sent him back to Britain to evaluate the capabilities of the Rolls-Royce Nene jet engines that the United Kingdom had sold the Soviet Union for its MiG-15 fighters.

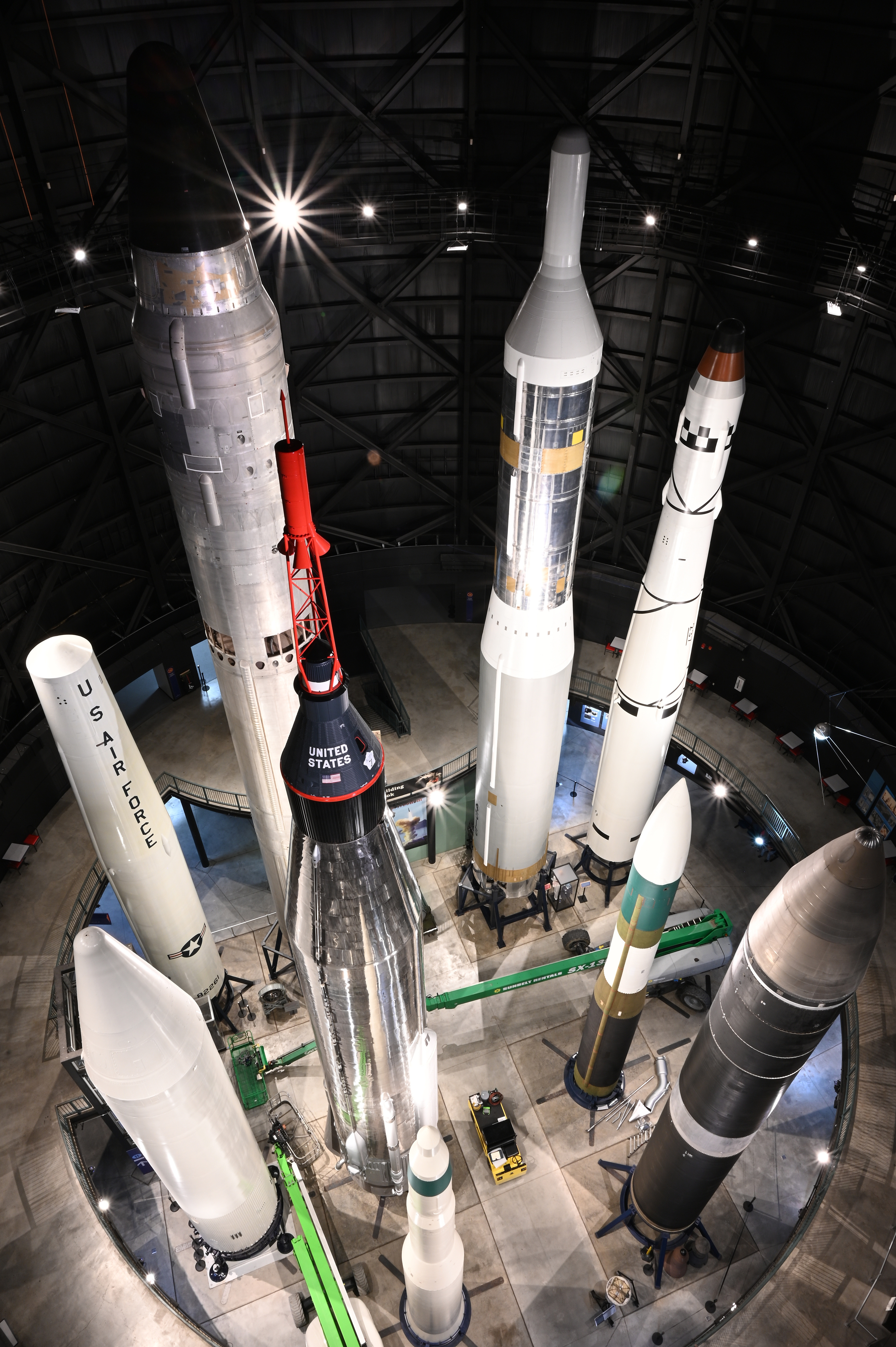
Missile gallery at the National Museum of the United States Air Force. At top left is a Titan II, then (clockwise) a Titan I, Thor-Agena, Minuteman III, Peacekeeper, Minuteman I, Jupiter a and a Thor missile. In the centre is a silver SM-65 Atlas with a Mercury spacecraft.

On 22 May 1950, Hall returned to the WADC as the assistant chief of the Non-Rotating Engine Branch of the Power Plant Laboratory, which was responsible for rockets and ramjets. He participated in the development of solid and liquid rocket power plants. He worked with Rocketdyne to develop a more powerful engine than the one used in the V-2, providing USAF funding for the project. The resulting engine had 75,000 pounds-force (330,000 N) of thrust, but was neither as powerful nor as reliable as Hall wanted. Nonetheless, it saw service in the Army's Redstone missile, which had its first launch in 1953. He pursued the development of a larger rocket engine, diverting funds intended for the development of the Navaho cruise missile, which Hall regarded as impractical owing to the limitations of the inertial navigation systems of the day.

Hall discovered that among the projects that Major Sidney Greene, the chief of the New Developments Office, was responsible for was Project MX-1593, the Atlas missile program. At this point only paper studies had been done. Hall suggested that the project be transferred to him, and $2 million (equivalent to $19 million in 2024) earmarked for studies by Convair be transferred to him and used to pay Rocketdyne for the development of a prototype rocket engine for an intercontinental ballistic missile (ICBM) based on the Navaho engine. Greene agreed to do this. This was legal, but should have been cleared with the WADC commander, Major General Albert Boyd. When Convair found out about this, a complaint was lodged with the Secretary of the Air Force, Harold E. Talbott, who asked Boyd for an explanation. After hearing what Greene had to say, Boyd endorsed his decision. The result of the efforts of Hall and Rocketdyne's engineers was a prototype engine that generated 120,000 pounds-force (530,000 N) of thrust. Like most liquid fuel engines at the time, it burned liquid oxygen and alcohol fuel. Hall realised that highly-refined kerosene would make a better rocket fuel, and he gave it the military designation RP-1. Modifying the engine to burn RP-1 lifted its thrust to 135,000 pounds-force (600,000 N).

In May 1954, on the recommendation of the "Teapot" Committee chaired by John von Neumann, the USAF accorded top priority to Project Atlas, and Colonel Bernard A. Schriever was appointed to command the Western Development Division (WDD) in Inglewood, California, which oversaw its development. Hall, now a lieutenant colonel, joined the WDD in August 1954 as the chief of Propulsion Development. As such, he directed the development of engines for the Atlas and Titan ICBMs, and the Thor intermediate range ballistic missile (IRBM). He was promoted to colonel in February 1957. That year, Hall became director of the Weapon System 315A (Thor) development program. Hall differed with Schriever over the role of Ramo-Wooldridge, which Schriever had contracted to oversee the integration of the project; Hall felt that USAF had sufficient technical expertise to manage the project itself. Schriever sent Hall to England to supervise the installation of Thor missiles there.

After Schriever relieved him as the director of the Thor project in 1957, Hall requested a transfer out of the WDD, but Schriever declined his request and gave Hall the job of overseeing development of Weapon System 133A, the Minuteman missile. This would be the first ICBM to use solid fuel, and as such was a major challenge, and one that Hall had long sought. A solid-fuel ICBM potentially had many advantages over a liquid-fuel one, first and foremost that it could be stored in readiness for long periods of time, and then launched in "under a minute". There were many technical obstacles that had to be overcome. The problem of getting the fuel to burn evenly was solved by Hall's idea of casting the fuel with a star-shaped cut down the middle. A more difficult problem that Hall solved was that of shutting down the rocket in flight, which he achieved by opening ports to reduce the pressure and snuff out the propellant. Steering was achieved with swiveling engine nozzles.

The resulting three-stage rocket weighed only 65,000 pounds (29,000 kg) at lift-off compared to 243,000 pounds (110,000 kg) for Atlas. To do this, he compelled the nuclear weapon designers to get the weight of a 1-megatonne-of-TNT (4.2 PJ) hydrogen bomb down to under 500 pounds (230 kg). Hall remained in charge of Minuteman until August 1958, when Schriever relieved him. As the design problems were largely solved and the project moved into a new phase of testing and production, Schriever felt that the project required someone with greater administrative skills who could work more harmoniously with all the stakeholders involved. Hall was awarded an oak leaf cluster to his Legion of Merit in 1960 for his contribution to the development of solid-fuel rockets. He would be remembered as the "father of the Minuteman ICBM".

Hall was sent to Paris to take the lead in designing, developing, producing, and deploying a solid-fueled IRBM for NATO. Coordinating engineers from France, Germany, Italy and the UK was no easy task, but he managed to get the project under way. The result of this effort was the only European IRBM: the French Diamant.

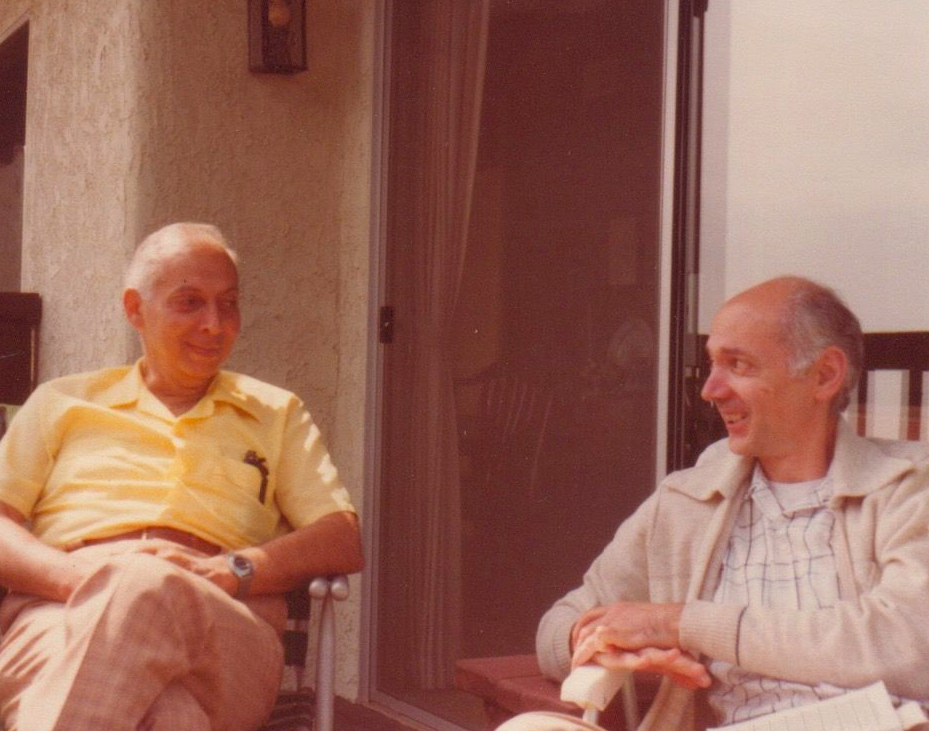
Ted Hall (right) with Ed at Ed's home in Palos Verdes in 1980

== Later life ==
On 27 October 1959, Hall retired from the Air Force with the rank of colonel and then joined United Aircraft Corporation as an engineer. He spent fourteen years there before retiring. In retirement, he continued to perform consulting work for aerospace companies. In 1999, he received the Air Force Space and Missile Pioneers Award and was elected a member of the Hall of Fame at the US Air Force Space Command at Peterson Air Force Base in Colorado.

A broken hip in 2005 and other medical problems left him bedridden at his home in Rolling Hills Estates for a year and a half. He died at Torrance Memorial Medical Center in Torrance, California, on 15 January 2006.
