= Pablo González Yagüe =

Russian-Spanish journalist (born 1982)

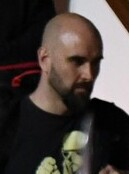
- Gónzalez landing at the Vnukovo International Airport following his release, August 2024
- Born: Pável Alekséjevič Rubcóv; 28 April 1982 (age 44); Moscow, Russian SFSR, Soviet Union
- Occupations: Journalist, GRU operative

Pablo González Yagüe (born Pavel Alekseyevich Rubtsov; Russian: Павел Алексеевич Рубцов; born 28 April 1982) is a Russian–Spanish journalist and an alleged GRU operative.

On 27 February 2022, González was arrested by Polish authorities near the border with Ukraine, and was later accused of being a Russian spy and a GRU agent. After being held in pre-trial detention for 886 days, González was released in a prisoner exchange on 1 August 2024. He was welcomed by Vladimir Putin on his arrival to Vnukovo International Airport the same day.

== Biography ==
Pavel Alekseyevich Rubtsov was born on 28 April 1982 in Moscow, Soviet Union. He is the son of Alexey Eugenievich Rubtsov (born 1958) and María Elena González, who married in 1980. However, their marriage fell apart and they divorced in 1991. Alexey Rubtsov is a Russian scientist and has served as a manager of the RBC Group since 1999. According to journalist Irina Borogan, Alexey has worked for the Russian intelligence guising himself as a journalist.

Rubtsov's maternal grandfather, Andrés González Yagüe, was born in 1929 in Biscay, Spain. In 1937, he was among the 1,500 Basque children who were evacuated to the Soviet Union by the Republican government during the Spanish Civil War. He worked at a ZiL automobile factory and married a Russian woman named Galina, with whom he had two children, including Elena. He was a member of the CPSU from 1963 to 1970 and returned to Spain in 1991.

He lived in the Soviet Union until the age of nine, when his mother divorced his father and took her son with her to the Basque Country, where she changed his name by legal process to the Spanish name Pablo González Yagüe. They resided in Bilbao and in Catalonia.

He graduated with a degree in Slavic philology and a master in strategic studies and international security. As a journalist he has worked with such publications as La Sexta, Público and Gara.

In the 1990s and 2000s González worked as an independent journalist for different mediums, specialising in Eastern Europe and ex-Soviet countries. He covered various conflicts like the Second Nagorno-Karabakh War, the war in Donbas (his assistant was ukrainian journalist Petro Terentyev) and the 2022 Russian invasion of Ukraine. According to a journalistic investigation by Spanish TV channel ANTENA 3, he had been working as a spy for Russian military intelligence since at least 2010. He participated in regular meetings with his GRU handlers in Istanbul. The Polish authorities secured thousands of documents on his computer covering "persons of special interest" for the Russian authorities, such as opposition figures. Rubtsov communicated with his handlers using advanced proprietary encryption software called "NEXUS", never used public Wi-Fi networks and preferred personal meetings outside of Schengen area. In February 2022 Rubtsov was instructed to travel to Ukraine, where he was briefly detained by border force, but released after 12 hours due to lack of evidence for any wrongdoing. There he traveled for a journalist visit to a weapons factory in Dnipro, accredited as a LaSexta television journalist. He complained to his colleagues that he was unable to make any recordings because his group was not allowed to bring any electronic equipment to inside the factory. From Ukraine, he traveled to Turkey, justifying it as he needed to "calm down a bit". Then on 14 February he traveled to Poland, then to Spain on 17 February. On 24 February when the Russian invasion started, Rubtsov returned to Poland, quite confident in his cover identity. He continued reconnaissance work in the Eastern part of Poland until his arrest. His phone contained hundreds of photographs of critical infrastructure objects.

Generally, Rubtsov socialised with leftist and progressive circles, as well as with Catalan separatists who are suspect of Russian ties. For several years, he had been in a relationship with Zhanna Nemtsova, the daughter of well-known Russian opposition figure Boris Nemtsov. Later, he was the domestic partner of a left-wing Polish journalist. At the same time, he was purportedly married to a Spanish national who publicly spoke on his behalf during and after his detention.

=== Detention in Poland ===
Shortly before his arrest, González was present in Przemyśl in Poland near Ukraine's border and was posting on Twitter about presence of "non-white people" in the wave of refugees escaping the Russian invasion, posing with citizens of Bangladesh and Nigeria who crossed from Ukraine into Poland.

According to Polish authorities, Pablo González was detained in the border city of Przemyśl on the night of 27–28 February 2022 on charges of participating in foreign intelligence activities against Poland. He was accused of being an agent of the GRU, taking advantage of his role as a journalist to travel around Europe and gather information. This charge carries a possible sentence of up to 10 years in prison. A search of his digital media by police found detailed reports on the activities of former opposition leader Boris Nemtsov's daughter, as well as people from her entourage.

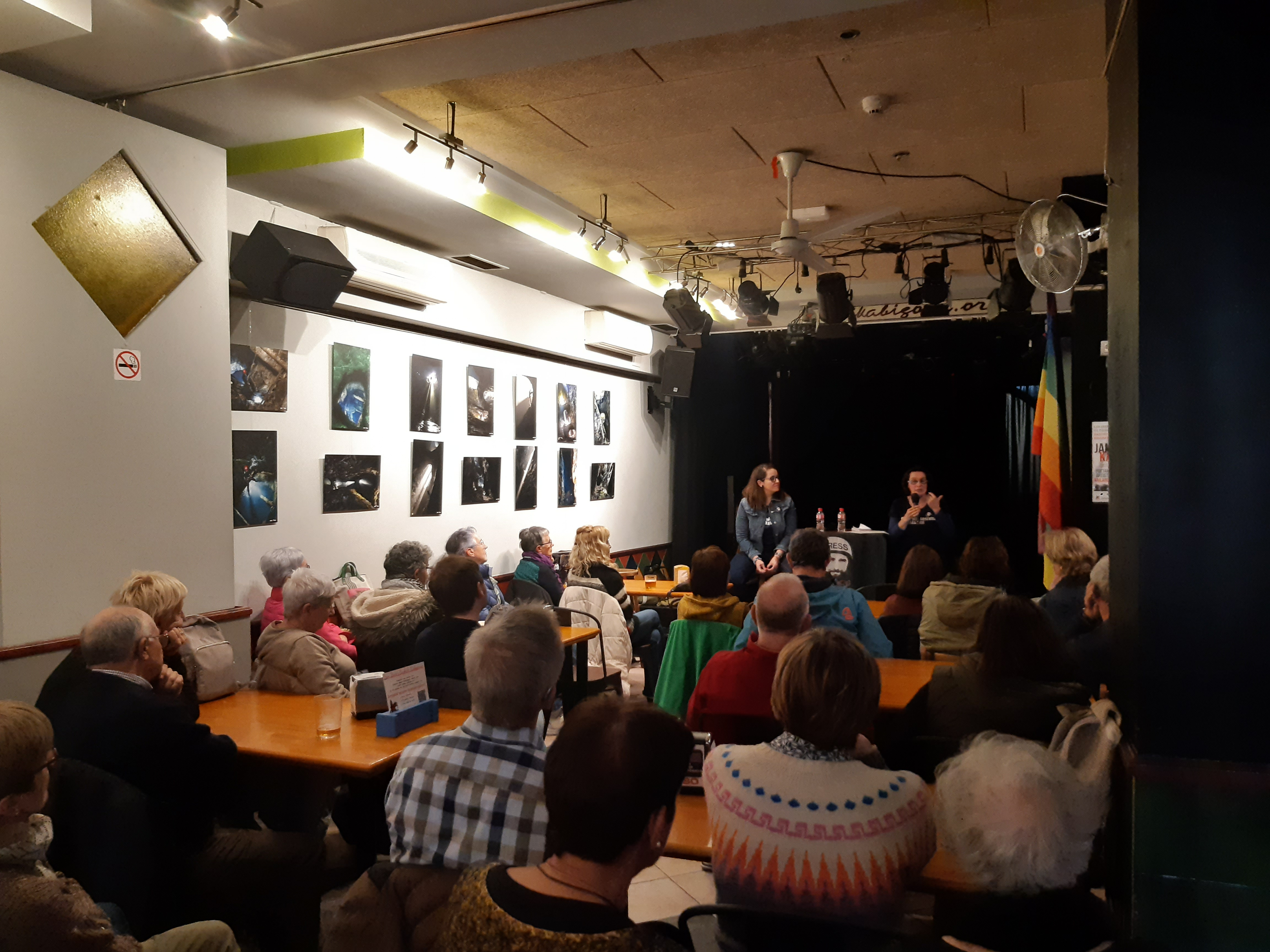
Solidarity with González in Irun

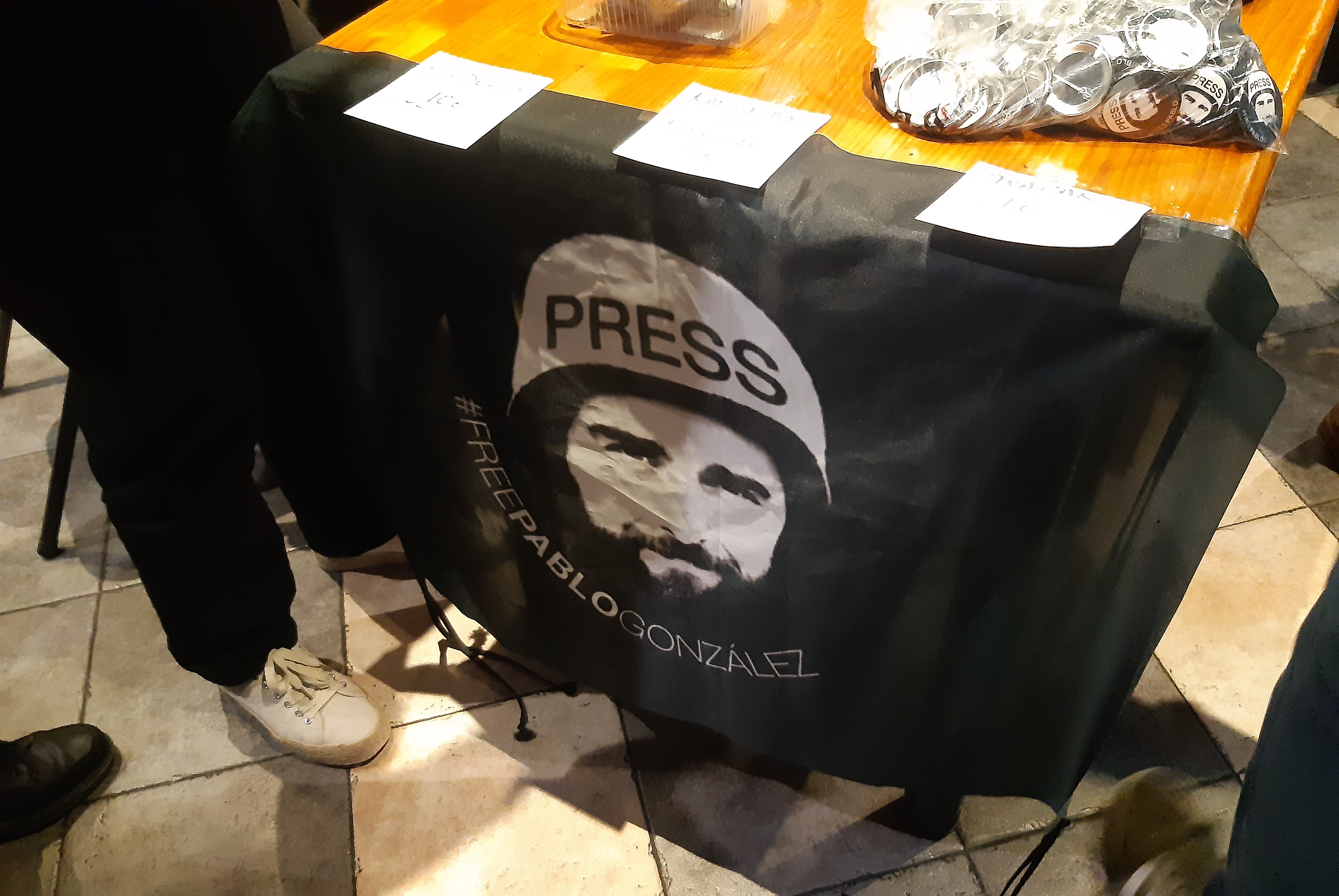
Sign demanding González's release

Following his arrest, Polish authorities held him incommunicado. He was unable to communicate with his lawyer Gonzalo Boye or with his family, a practice against which journalists and Spanish politicians protested to the Polish authorities and to the Foreign office of Spain. The Committee to Protect Journalists requested the Polish authorities provide him suitable access to legal representation and to a just and transparent procedure.

In July 2022 Gonzalez was for the first time officially referred to as "Russian illegal" by Richard Moore, head of MI6.

On 13 September 2022, after 200 days in detention, he brought a case about his prison conditions in front of the European Court of Human Rights in Strasbourg, claiming the violation of the European Convention on Human Rights.

On 22 November, Polish authorities informed him that his wife could visit him in the prison of Radom where he was being detained. On 24 November, the Polish justice announced that it was extending his imprisonment for three months, without making public any evidence against him.

== Post-release ==
On 1 August 2024, Rubtsov was returned to Russia as part of a multinational exchange of prisoners, arriving to Moscow on 2 August, where he was welcomed by Putin. Right after handshake with Putin, Rubtsov hugged with a group of men in suits, one of which was Oleg Sotnikov, a GRU officer wanted by FBI for "hacking and related influence and disinformation operations", expelled from Netherlands for hacking attempts at OPCW.
